= FWO =

FWO may refer to:

- Fair Work Ombudsman, an agency of the Government of Australia
- Frontier Works Organization, a staff corps of the Pakistan Army
- Research Foundation – Flanders (FWO), a Dutch-speaking successor to the Belgian National Fund for Scientific Research
- Fort Worth Opera, professional opera company based in Texas, USA
