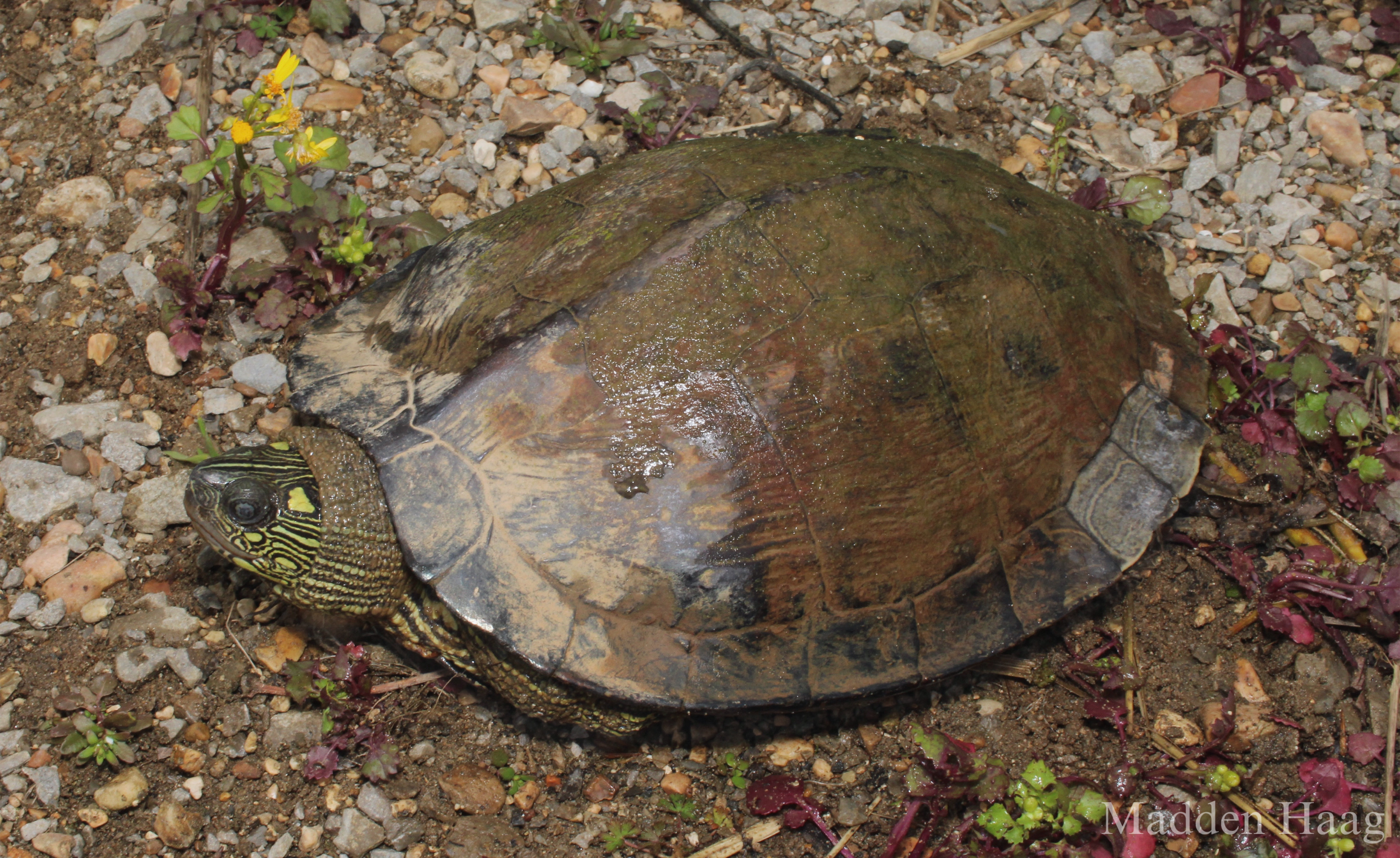

Conservation status
- Least Concern (IUCN 3.1)

Scientific classification
- Kingdom: Animalia
- Phylum: Chordata
- Class: Reptilia
- Order: Testudines
- Suborder: Cryptodira
- Family: Emydidae
- Genus: Graptemys
- Species: G. ouachitensis

Binomial name
- Graptemys ouachitensis Cagle, 1953

= Ouachita map turtle =

Species of turtle

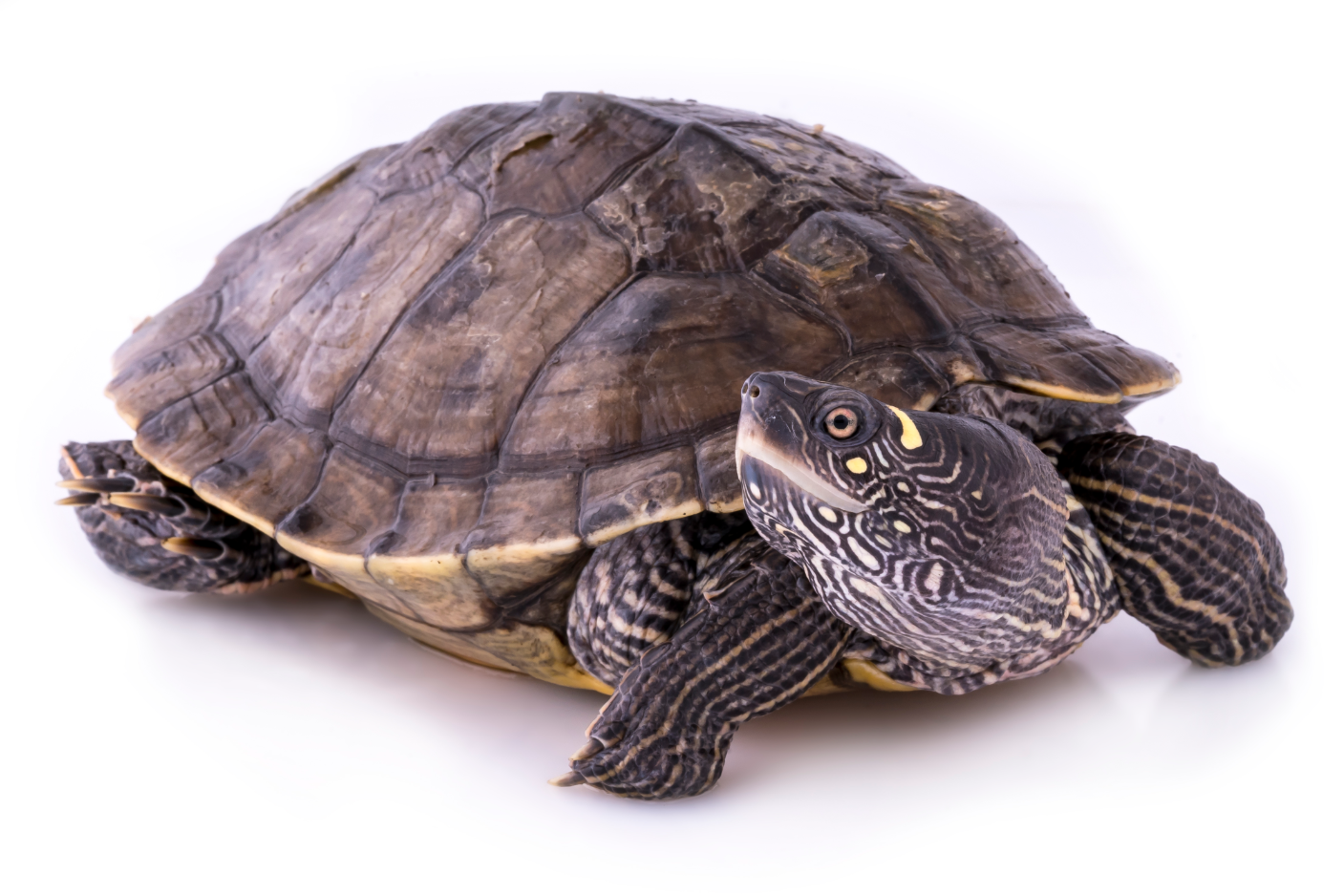
An Ouachita map turtle photographed at the Gavins Point National Fish Hatchery in Yankton, South Dakota, on February 2, 2021.

The Ouachita map turtle (Graptemys ouachitensis) is a species of turtle belonging to the family Emydidae.

== Subspecies ==
Subspecies include:

- Graptemys ouachitensis ouachitensis Cagle, 1953
- Graptemys ouachitensis sabinensis Cagle, 1953

In recent years the Sabine map turtle (Graptemys ouachitensis sabinensis) has been recognized by many as a full species Sabine map turtle (Graptemys sabinensis).

== Distribution ==
This species is endemic to the United States. It can be found in Texas, Louisiana, Mississippi, Alabama, Oklahoma, Kansas, Arkansas, Missouri, Iowa, Minnesota, Wisconsin, Indiana, Ohio, West Virginia, Illinois, Tennessee and Kentucky. G. o. sabinensis exists only in the Sabine River of Louisiana and Texas. Both G. o. ouachitensis and G. o. sabinensis are freshwater riverine turtles. The G. o. ouachitensis is rarely seen on land unless it is nesting season or it is basking.

== Description ==
This species' carapace features a row of low vertebral spines, and is serrated on the posterior rim. The carapace is olive, dark brown, or black in coloration with light yellowish markings with dark borders. The plastron color varies from cream to yellow and is patterned with dark lines and swirls. The body color is grayish brown to blackish and is marked with yellowish stripes.

On the head, it has light yellow spots: a rectangular one behind each eye, an oval under each eye, and a round one on each side of the jaw. In some specimens, the spot behind and the spot under the eye can combine to form a single thick "C" stain. The eye has a black stripe in the middle.

Males are significantly smaller than females. The males can grow to be as large as 5 in (13 cm) in carapace length. The females can grow to be up to 10 in (25 cm) in carapace length.

== Natural history ==
Hatchlings of this species have recently been found to make sounds prior to exiting the nest. These are mostly "clicking" noises, but more tonal "mewing" sounds are also sometimes present. These sounds are the first documented for any North American hatchling turtle.

== Diet ==
Ouachita map turtles feed mainly on small aquatic animals such as shrimp, insects (such as mayflies, caddisflies, beetles, grasshoppers, fly larvae, and midge larvae), molluscs, fish, and fish carrion. They also consume algae and aquatic plants (such as pondweed, duckweed, and manna grass).

== Pet trade ==
As they are small, Ouachita map turtles are common among turtle keepers. They can be kept with most other species and can be raised on specialty pellets and dried shrimp. Although they need heat and ultraviolet light (UVB),

== Gallery ==
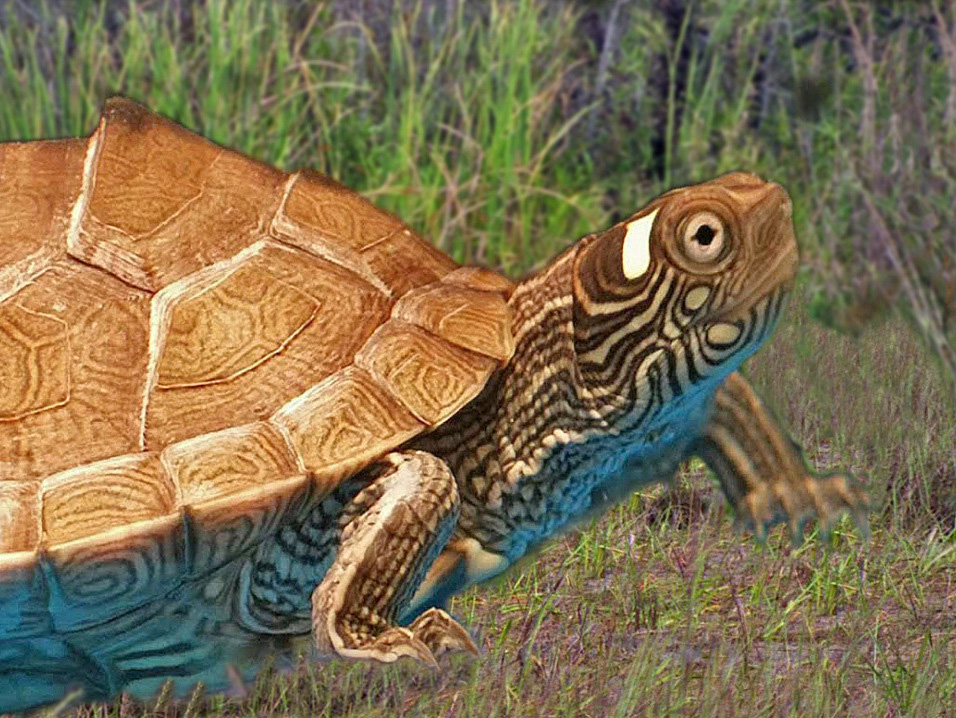
Juvenile Graptemys ouachitensis. Close-up

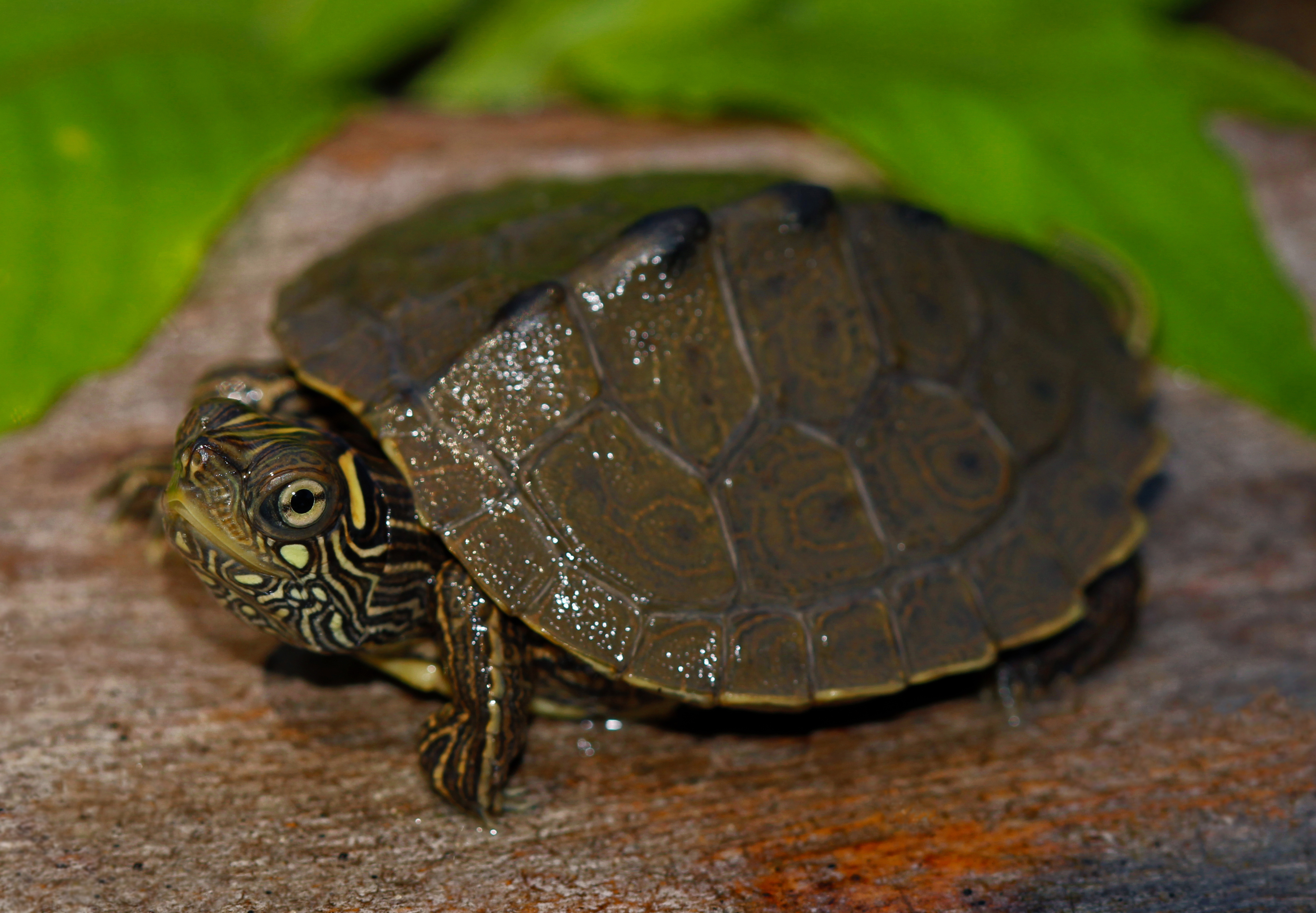
A specimen from Missouri

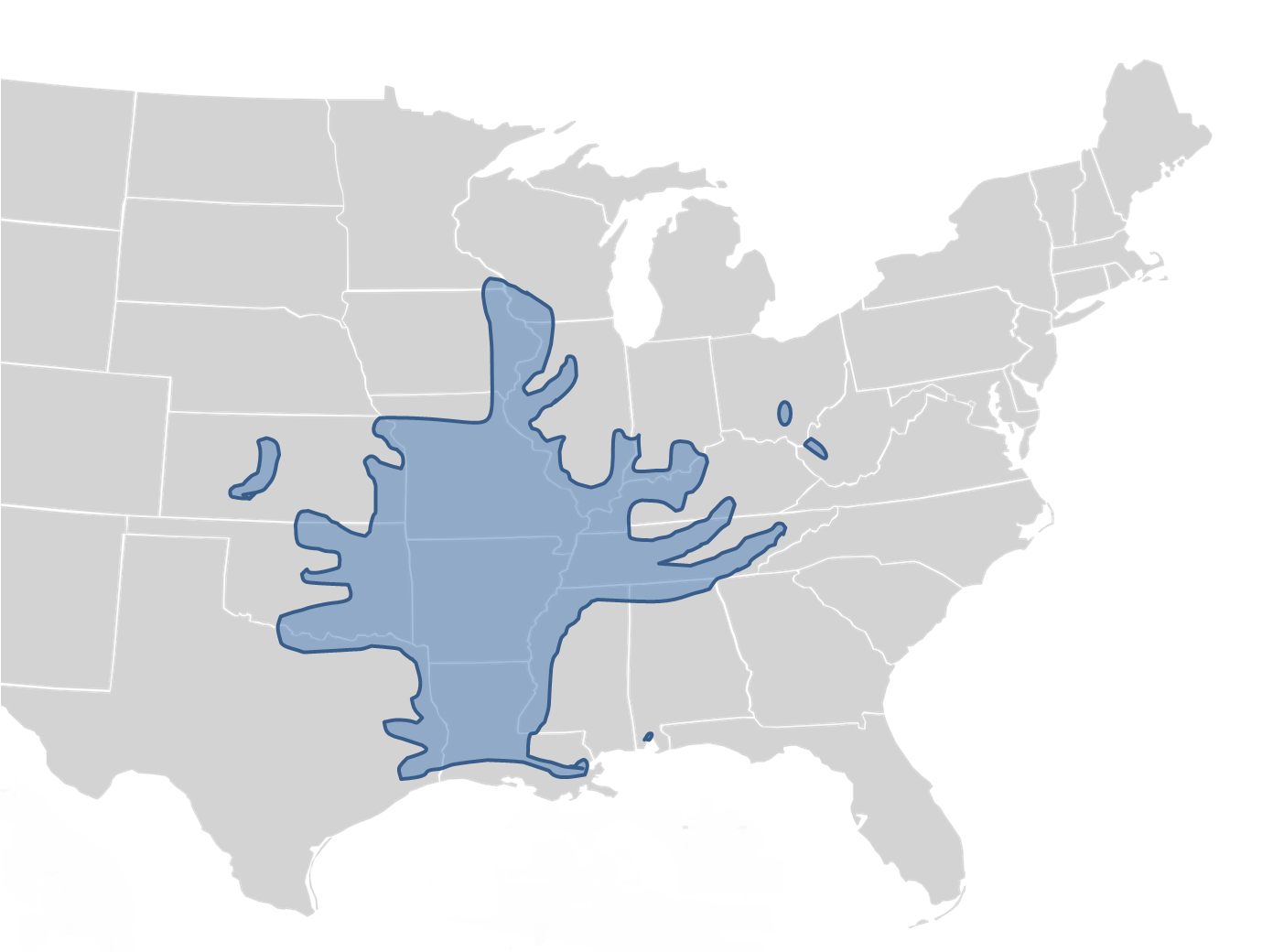
Range map of the Ouachita map turtle

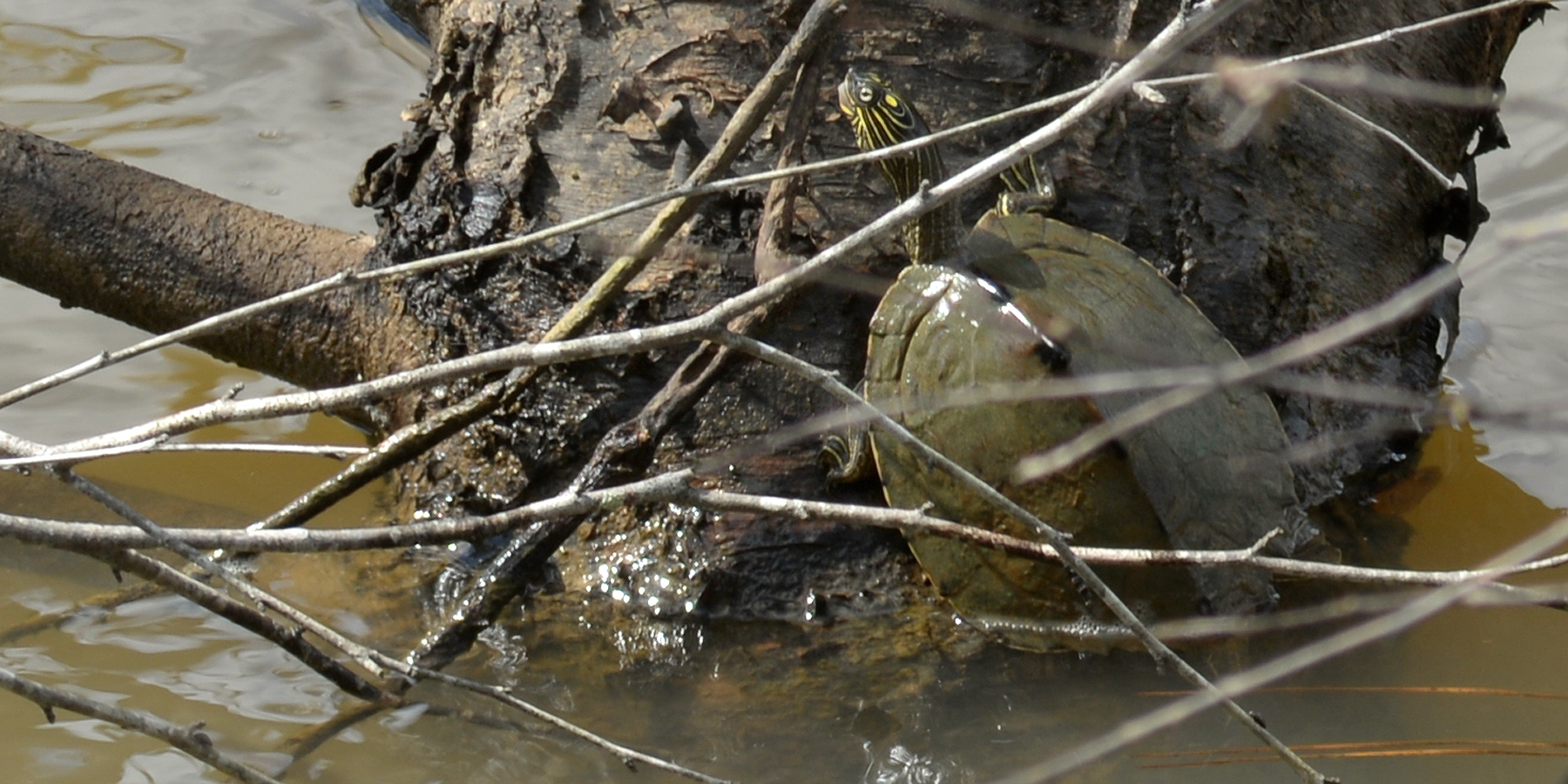
Sabine map turtle (Graptemys sabinensis) in Orange County, Texas.
