= Sino-German Center for Research Promotion =

Joint science project of China and Germany

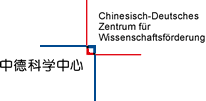
Logo of the Sino-German Center for Research Promotion

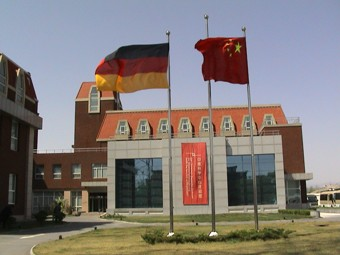
Front view of the SGC

The Sino-German Center for Research Promotion (SGC) is a joint institution based in Beijing, established by the German Research Foundation and the National Natural Science Foundation of China (NSFC).

The NSFC is the most important institution in China for the funding of basic research in the natural sciences, life sciences, engineering sciences and management sciences. The DFG is the central self-governing research funding organisation in Germany. It serves all branches of science and the humanities by funding research projects at universities and other public research institutions. Both organisations aim to deepen and expand mutual scientific relations. The first cooperation agreement was signed in 1988.

The SGC is tasked with promoting scientific cooperation between Germany and China with a focus on the natural sciences, life sciences, engineering sciences and management sciences. The Center serves as an information platform, works to improve the framework for scientific cooperation between Germany and China and facilitates the exchange of information about the research system in each country. The SGC organises various information and networking events and provides information on the bilateral funding opportunities of the DFG and the NSFC. In this way it makes an important contribution to long-term cooperation between universities, research institutions and researchers in both countries.

== History ==
The initiative of the NSFC and the DFG to found a jointly run center originated with a Chinese proposal in 1994. The idea was to create an institution to intensify scientific exchange between Germany and China.

The decision to establish such a project was formalised in 1995, when the founding agreement for the SGC was signed in the presence of Federal Chancellor Helmut Kohl and Chinese Premier Li Peng. In 1998 the agreement was signed by the DFG and NSFC, allowing the SGC to become reality. The foundation stone was laid in the same year. On 19 October 2000 the new building was opened and the SGC went into operation.

== Organization ==
The SGC is an independent legal entity under Chinese law. Its legal representative is the NSFC's vice president for foreign affairs. The guidelines for the SGC's activities are laid down by a joint committee of four Chinese and four German members appointed by the NSFC and the DFG respectively. The Joint Committee convenes once a year. It appoints the directors and vice directors of the center, consults on and approves its work programme, and receives the annual report and annual accounts.

The work of the center is managed by the internal board in cooperation with the DFG and the NSFC. The German side of the SGC also represents the DFG as a local point of contact in China for individual researchers and various partner organisations.

== Bilateral Funding programmes of the DFG and the NSFC ==
An agreement of the DFG and the NSFC enables funding in different stages of cooperation.

- The Initiation of International Collaboration can be submitted any time (Initiation of International Collaboration)
- Two funding programmes between the DFG and the NSFC are currently being established to promote networking and intensify contacts. Further information and calls for proposals will follow.
1. Forum (different symposia and workshop formats)
2. Mobility (duration 3 years; German and Chinese teams Teams can organise trips and workshops)
- Bilateral research projects to be conducted collaboratively between researchers at institutes based in the respective country can be submitted in response to joint calls for proposals. Details of current calls for proposals and contact persons (DFG-NSFC Calls for proposals)

== Location ==
The SGC building is located next to the NSFC in Haidian District in northwestern Beijing. It is near Tsinghua University and Beijing University. Situated between the fourth and fifth ring roads, the SGC is also linked to the metro (line 15; station Qinghuadongluxikou).

== Other German science organisations in Beijing ==
- Fraunhofer-Gesellschaft
- German Academic Exchange Service
- Helmholtz Association of German Research Centres
