= Science Europe =

European scientific research association

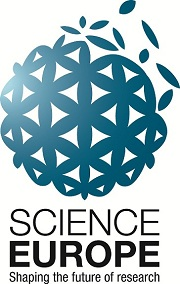
- Formation: October 2011; 14 years ago
- Type: Association of research organization
- Purpose: Research
- Headquarters: Brussels
- Website: www.scienceeurope.org

Science Europe is an association of major research funding organisations (RFOs) and research performing organisations (RPOs). It was established in October 2011 and is based in Brussels.

The association facilitates co-operation among its members and supports excellence in science and research in all disciplines, acting as a platform to develop positions on research policy issues and to address policy messages to the European institutions, researchers, national governments, and the public.

The RFOs and RPOs that make up Science Europe share a common mission: to fund and perform excellent research in a world where scientific communities are less and less shaped by national borders. They also share the responsibility of managing a substantial proportion of national public research investments in Europe. Science Europe was established by its members to act as a platform to share experience and practice, develop, and deploy collective strategies to face their common challenges, as well as to speak with one voice to other science policy stakeholders when it is relevant to do so.

The policy-related work of Science Europe is guided by a roadmap. This document outlines the strategic objectives for Science Europe, as well as nine "Priority Action Areas" on which its member organisations collaborate.

== Member organizations ==
The members of Science Europe are "Research Funding and Research Performing Organisations":

- Austria: Austrian Science Fund (FWF), Austrian Academy of Sciences (ÖAW)
- Belgium: National Fund for Scientific Research (FRS-FNRS), Research Foundation - Flanders (FWO).
- Bulgaria: Bulgarian Academy of Sciences.
- Czech Republic: Czech Science Foundation (GACR).
- Croatia: Croatian Science Foundation (HRZZ).
- Denmark: Danish Council for Independent Research (DFF), Danish national Research Foundation (DG).
- Estonia: Estonian Research Council (ETAG).
- Finland: Academy of Finland (AKA).
- France: Agence nationale de la recherche (ANR).
- Germany: Deutsche Forschungsgemeinschaft (DFG)
- Hungary: Hungarian Research Network (HUN-REN), Hungarian Academy of Sciences (MTA)
- Iceland: Icelandic Centre for Research (Rannís).
- Ireland: Health Research Board (HRB), Irish Research Council (IRC), Science Foundation Ireland (SFI).
- Italy: National Institute for Nuclear Physics (INFN).
- Latvia: Latvian Science Council (LZP).
- Lithuania: Research Council of Lithuania (LMT).
- Luxembourg: National Research Fund (FNR).
- Netherlands: Netherlands Organisation for Scientific Research (NWO).
- Norway: Research Council of Norway (RCN).
- Poland: Foundation for Polish Science (FNP), National Science Centre (NCN).
- Portugal: Fundação para a Ciência e Tecnologia (FCT) .
- Romania: Executive Agency for Higher Education, Research, Development and Innovation Funding of Romania (UEFISCDI) .
- Serbia: Science Fund of the Republic of Serbia (SFRS)
- Slovakia: Slovak Research and Development Agency (APVV).
- Slovenia: Slovenian Research and Innovation Agency (ARIS).
- Spain: Spanish National Research Council (CSIC), Spanish State Research Agency (AEI), Carlos III Health Institute (ISCIII)
- Sweden: Swedish Research Council for Health, Working Life and Welfare (FORTE), Swedish Research Council for Sustainable Development (FORMAS), Swedish Research Council (VR).
- Switzerland: Swiss National Science Foundation (SNSF).
- Ukraine: National Research Foundation of Ukraine (NRFU)
- United Kingdom: UK Research and Innovation (UKRI).

== Areas of Activity ==
Science Europe carries out advocacy and policy activities in a variety of research policy areas, including:

- Cross-border Collaboration
- Gender and Diversity
- Green and Digital Transition
- EU Framework Programmes: Horizon 2020 and Horizon Europe
- Innovation and Impact
- Open Access to Scientific Publications (including the development and promotion of Plan S and a focus on Diamond open access)
- Open Science
- Research Assessment
- Research Careers
- Research Data
- Research Infrastructures
- Research Integrity

Dedicated working groups, high level policy networks, and task forces are set up around these policy areas to make concrete progress on finding common approaches; these groups draw on the extensive experience of the Member Organisations. Science Europe regularly publishes position statements, practical guides, policy briefs, survey reports, and other documents on these topics which provide analyses, present results, and make recommendations for research stakeholders.

== EU Legislation & Regulatory Affairs ==
Science Europe is active on topics relating to EU legislation and regulatory affairs which have a large impact on the research sector, current topics include:

- Directive on Copyright
- General Data Protection Regulation
- Directive on Protection of Animals Used for Scientific Purposes
- Regulation on the Free Flow of Non-personal Data
- Review of the Directive on Public Sector Information

== See also ==
- Plan S – an open access initiative launched by a consortium of research funding organisations led by Science Europe
