= Angelika Kalt =

Swiss professor of petrology and geodynamics

Angelika Kalt is a Swiss professor of petrology and geodynamics who was at The University of Neuchâtel from 2000 to 2008. She started at the Swiss National Science Foundation (SNSF) in 2008 and in April 2016, became its director.

While at University of Neuchâtel, she started a cross-university doctoral school in mineralogy. At the SNSF, her team includes 59% of women.

In 2017 Kalt became an ordinary member of the governing board of Science Europe.
