= German Research Foundation =

Research funding organization

- Deutsche Forschungsgemeinschaft
- Abbreviation: DFG
- Predecessor: Notgemeinschaft der Deutschen Wissenschaft
- Formation: 1951; 75 years ago
- Purpose: Science funding in Germany
- Headquarters: Bonn, Germany
- President: Katja Becker
- Main organ: General Assembly
- Affiliations: International Science Council
- Budget: €3.3 billion (2019)
- Website: dfg.de

The German Research Foundation (German: Deutsche Forschungsgemeinschaft [ˈdɔʏtʃə ˈfɔʁʃʊŋsɡəˌmaɪnʃaft]; abbr. DFG [ˌdeːʔɛfˈɡeː]) is a German research funding organization, which functions as a self-governing institution for the promotion of science and research in the Federal Republic of Germany. In 2019, the DFG had a funding budget of €3.3 billion.

== Function ==
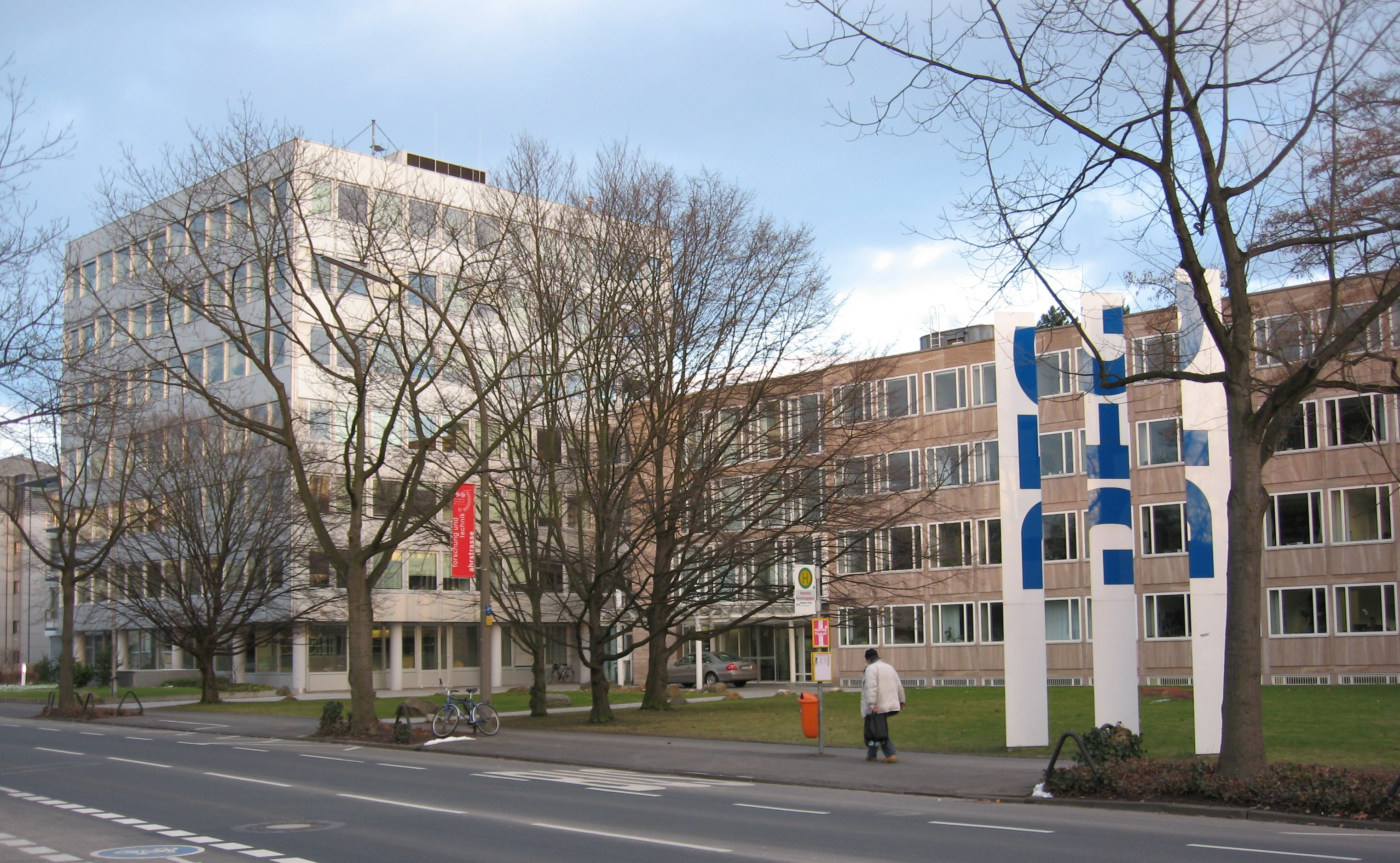
Site of DFG in Bonn, Germany

A research proposal for a project the DFG decided to fund

The DFG supports research in science, engineering, and the humanities through a variety of grant programs, research prizes, and by funding infrastructure. The self-governed organization is based in Bonn and financed by the German states and the federal government of Germany. As of 2017 the organization consists of approximately 100 research universities and other research institutions.

The DFG endows various research prizes, including the Leibniz Prize. The Polish-German science award Copernicus is offered jointly with the Foundation for Polish Science.

According to a 2017 article in The Guardian, the DFG has announced it will publish its research in online open-access journals.

== Background ==
In 1937, the Notgemeinschaft der Deutschen Wissenschaft (NG) ("Emergency Association of German Science") was renamed the Deutsche Gemeinschaft zur Erhaltung und Förderung der Forschung ("German Foundation for the Preservation and Promotion of Research"), for short known as the Deutsche Forschungsgemeinschaft (DFG). Even before the election of the National Socialist German Workers' Party (Nazi party) to power in 1933, projects funded by the NG had worked diligently on Nazi-aligned research, especially German ethnographic research in Eastern Europe that would lay the foundations for the Hitlerite "Lebensraum" and extermination policies; during the National Socialist period, the NG leadership showed itself ready and willing to adapt to the "new era" by gearing its funding practices towards issues related to German rearmament and autarky, essentially aligning its goals with those of the new regime. By the end of World War II in Germany, in 1945, the DFG was no longer active. In 1949, after formation of the Federal Republic, it was re-founded as the NG and again from 1951 as the DFG.

== Structure ==
The legal status of the DFG is that of an association under private law. As such, the DFG can only act through its statutory bodies, in particular through its executive board and the General Assembly.

The DFG is a member of the International Council for Science and has numerous counterparts around the globe such as the National Natural Science Foundation of China, the National Science Foundation (US) and the Royal Society (UK).

The DFG has several representative offices in Asia, North America and Europe and also maintains the Sino-German Center for Research Promotion, which was jointly founded by the DFG and the National Natural Science Foundation of China. On 9 June 2012, DFG launched a centre in Hyderabad, to expand its presence in India. The German-based research foundation and India's Department of Science and Technology are together working on 40 bilateral research projects in science and engineering. The German Research Foundation is a member of Science Europe.

== Heisenberg Programme ==
The Heisenberg Programme of the DFG is aimed at young outstanding scientists who meet all the requirements for appointment to a permanent professorship. The programme was named after the German physicist Werner Heisenberg, who received the Nobel Prize in Physics at the age of 31. The funding programme aims to enable scientists to prepare for a scientific leadership position and to work on further research topics during this time. The maximum funding period is five years. Normally, the habilitation is a prerequisite for applying for admission to the programme. However, services similar to habilitation are also included in the selection.

The program consists of the following variants:

- The Heisenberg Scholarship
- The Heisenberg position is a DFG-funded temporary research assistant position at a university.
- The Heisenberg professorship a DFG-funded professorship with the aim of establishing a new research area within a scientific focus of the university.
- The Heisenberg temporary substitute position for clinicians is intended for clinically working scientists who can take some time off for research.

== Notable fundings and cooperations ==
- German National Library of Economics
- German National Library of Medicine
- German National Library of Science and Technology
- Greenpilot
- Virtual Library of Musicology

== See also ==
- Open access in Germany
- National Research Foundation (disambiguation)

== Bibliography ==
- Heilbron, J. L. The Dilemmas of an Upright Man: Max Planck and the Fortunes of German Science (Harvard, 2000) ISBN 978-0-674-00439-9
- Hentschel, Klaus (ed.), Hentschel, Ann M. (transl.). Physics and National Socialism: An Anthology of Primary Sources (Birkhäuser, 1996) ISBN 978-3-0348-9865-2
- Perspektiven der Forschung und Ihrer Förderung. 2007–2011. Deutsche Forschungsgemeinschaft (ed.); Wiley-VCH, Weinheim 2008, ISBN 978-3-527-32064-6.
- Anne Cottebrune: Der planbare Mensch. Die DFG und die menschliche Vererbungswissenschaft, 1920–1970 (= Studien zur Geschichte der Deutschen Forschungsgemeinschaft 2). Franz Steiner, Stuttgart 2008, ISBN 978-3-515-09099-5.
- Notker Hammerstein: Die Deutsche Forschungsgemeinschaft in der Weimarer Republik und im Dritten Reich. Wissenschaftspolitik in Republik und Diktatur 1920–1945. Beck, München 1999, ISBN 978-3-406-44826-3.
- Thomas Nipperdey, Ludwig Schmugge: 50 jahre forschungsförderung in deutschland: Ein Abriss der Geschichte der Deutschen Forschungsgemeinschaft. 1920–1970. [Anlässl. ihres 50jährigen Bestehens], Bad Godesberg: Deutsche Forschungsgemeinschaft 1970
