= Ralph Niger =

Anglo-French theologian

Ralph Niger, Latin Radulphus Niger or Radulfus Niger, anglicized Ralph the Black (c. 1140 – c. 1199), was an Anglo-French theologian and one of the English chroniclers.

Little is known about Niger's early life. From around 1160 to 1166, he studied in Paris, where he was a student of John of Salisbury and Gerard la Pucelle, and, at some point in his life, probably also in Poitiers. At Paris, he may also have been a teacher of rhetoric and dialectics.

Niger was part of Thomas Becket's entourage during the latter's exile in France in the early 1160s and played an important role in connecting the exiled archbishop with Pope Alexander III's German ally Conrad of Mainz. After the reconciliation between Henry II and Becket, he was employed by the king, but he left England for France after Becket's murder in 1170. After Henry's death in 1189, he returned to England, where he became a canon in Lincoln.

== Works ==
Apart from several theological works, Niger wrote two chronicles in Latin, one on the German emperors and the kings of France and England, which runs up to 1206, and the other one treating history from the world's origin up to the year 1199. In his chronicle, he remained a "violent partisan" of Becket and a critic of Henry, declaring that "the king let no year pass without molesting the country with new laws". His English chronicle was continued by Ralph of Coggeshall. Niger also wrote a treatise, De re militari, in which he was critical towards the Third Crusade.

Niger is an important source for late medieval music in Britain. A collection of four offices – Nativity, Annunciation, Assumption, and Purification — composed by him, both notation and text, is preserved in the library of Lincoln Cathedral (15, fols. 33–43, excepting 42). He introduces the offices with a short Latin treatise on the feasts. Most of his works are secular.

== Manuscripts ==
- Lincoln Cathedral Chapter Library: In Librum Numerorum; In Leviticum et Deuteronomium; In I–II Regum; In III–IV Regum; In Patalipomena et Esdram.

== Editions ==
- Chronicon. Edited by Robert Anstruther. Caxton Society, 1851. Full text online, with list of known works in preface.
- De re militari et triplici via peregrinationis Ierosolimitane. Edited by Ludwig Schmugge. De Gruyter, 1977.

== Translation ==
- On Warfare and the Threefold Path of the Jerusalem Pilgrimage: A Translation of Ralph Niger's De re militari et triplici via pereginationis Ierosolimitane. Translated by John D. Cotts. Routledge, 2023.

== Sources ==
- Lexikon des Mittelalters (München/Zürich, 1977–1999)
- K. Peltonen, History debated. The Historical Reliability of Chronicles in Pre-Critical and Critical Research. Publications of the Finnish Exegetical Society 64 (1996), 42, n. 125
- Bibliography at Monumenta Germaniae Historica
- P. Buc, "Exégèse et pensée politique: Radulphus Niger (vers 1190) et Nicolas de Lyre (vers 1330)", in Joël Blanchard (ed.), Représentation, pouvoir et royauté à la fin du Moyen Age (Paris: Picard, 1995), 145-164
