= Czech Science Foundation =

Czech independent public organisation

The Czech Science Foundation (GACR) was established in 1993 as an independent public organisation supporting basic research in the Czech Republic. On the basis of calls for proposals and a public competition, the Czech Science Foundation provides financial support for both experienced and young and early-stage researchers. It also funds international projects on a bilateral basis in cooperation with several partner agencies as well as projects carried out within international research programmes. It is one of two major government-supported research funding agencies in the Czech Republic, the other being the Technology Agency of the Czech Republic (TAČR).

== GACR goals ==
- To provide financial support for projects in basic research with a high potential for achieving world-class results.
- To promote and enhance international scientific cooperation in basic research.
- To help create attractive conditions for the professional development of young and early-stage researchers.
- To ensure that entrusted funds are used as effectively as possible to the benefit of the Czech and international scientific community.
- To create, within existing laws, the best possible conditions for the administration of project proposals and awarded projects.

== GACR structure ==
The GACR authorities are the President, Presidium, Scientific Advisory Board and Supervisory Board. The Presidium is assisted by Discipline Committees. Evaluation Panels are the expert bodies of Discipline Committee. Organizational and administrative work is in the competency of the GACR Office.

=== GACR Presidium ===
The Presidium of the Czech Science Foundation is appointed by the Government of the Czech Republic. The Presidium is authorized to organize the Calls for Proposals for scientific and research projects and to award grants. It consists of five members. The GACR Presidium is headed by the President who represents GACR and acts in its name in all relevant matters. Members of the Presidium are elected for four years with a maximum of two consecutive terms. Each member is responsible for one of the scientific areas (Physical Sciences, Social Sciences and Humanities, Technical Sciences, Medical and Biological Sciences, Agricultural and Biological-Environmental Sciences).

=== GACR Scientific Advisory Board ===
The Scientific Advisory Board consists of 12 experts representing different scientific fields. Membership in the Scientific Advisory Board lasts for four years with a maximum of two consecutive terms. The Scientific Advisory Board provides expert scientific advice to the GACR Presidium with regards to promoted projects and the structure and operation of GACR Discipline Committees and Panels. It also evaluates overall scientific level of the Czech Science Foundation and creates the strategy for its future development and direction.

=== GACR Supervisory Board ===
The Supervisory Board has 10 members, who are appointed by the Parliament of the Czech Republic. Membership in the Supervisory Board lasts for four years a maximum of two consecutive terms. The Supervisory Board controls the transparency of the evaluation process, oversees the distribution of funds and overall functioning of the Czech Science Foundation.

=== GACR Discipline Committees and Panels ===
Discipline Committees are permanent advisory bodies, which assist the Presidium during the evaluation process. Panels are the expert bodies of Discipline Committees. Each of the committees consists of Chairmen and Vice-Chairmen from individual Panels and has between 10 and 20 members who are nominated by the GACR Presidium. The total number of Panels is 39. Members are appointed for a two-year term with a possibility of two consecutive terms maximum.

=== GACR Office ===
The GACR Office is the organisational and administrative body of the Czech Science Foundation. It is managed by the Director, who is appointed and recalled by the GACR President. The GACR Office carries out the organisation of evaluation process of submitted project proposals and the agenda for ongoing and completed projects. International activities and administration of international projects are also handled by the Office. The office transfers funds to the recipients of the grants, offers consultations to recipients and grant project researchers in financial matters, administers the budget of the GACR Office, provides for all related agenda as well as monitors compliance with procedures and rules prescribed by the generally valid economic and legal regulations or by the GACR Guidelines.

== Types of projects ==
GACR provides financial support for the following types of projects:

- Standard projects: projects by outstanding scholars and research teams;
- Junior projects: projects for excellent young researchers and early-stage researchers with international experience;
- International projects: projects by international research teams based on agreements between GACR and foreign science foundations (bilateral agreements, Lead Agency Principle agreements, etc.); GACR has successfully established bilateral cooperation with three partner organizations:
  - Deutsche Forschungsgemeinschaft (DFG),
  - Ministry of Science and Technology (Taiwan) (MOST),
  - National Research Foundation of Korea (NRF).
- GACR proposes joint projects based on Lead Agency Principle with Fonds zur Förderung der wissenschaftlichen Forschung (FWF), Austria.
- Post-doctoral projects: projects by young and early-stage researchers (no new calls considered since 2014);
- Projects promoting excellence in basic research: multidisciplinary projects of several research institutions aimed at outstanding basic research that cannot be funded within GACR standard projects (no new calls).

The topic of all types of project is determined by the applicant (bottom-up principle). The duration of projects is 2–3 years and proposals are invited in all disciplines of basic research.

== International activities ==
Development and strengthening of international relations is one of the GACR’s long-term priorities. Worldwide international cooperation is implemented within the GACR’s membership in the Global Research Council (GRC), at the pan-European level especially within the GACR’s membership in Science Europe (SE). Based on bilateral agreements GACR closely cooperates with Germany, Austria, Taiwan and South Korea.
