= Katja Becker =

German biochemist (born 1965)

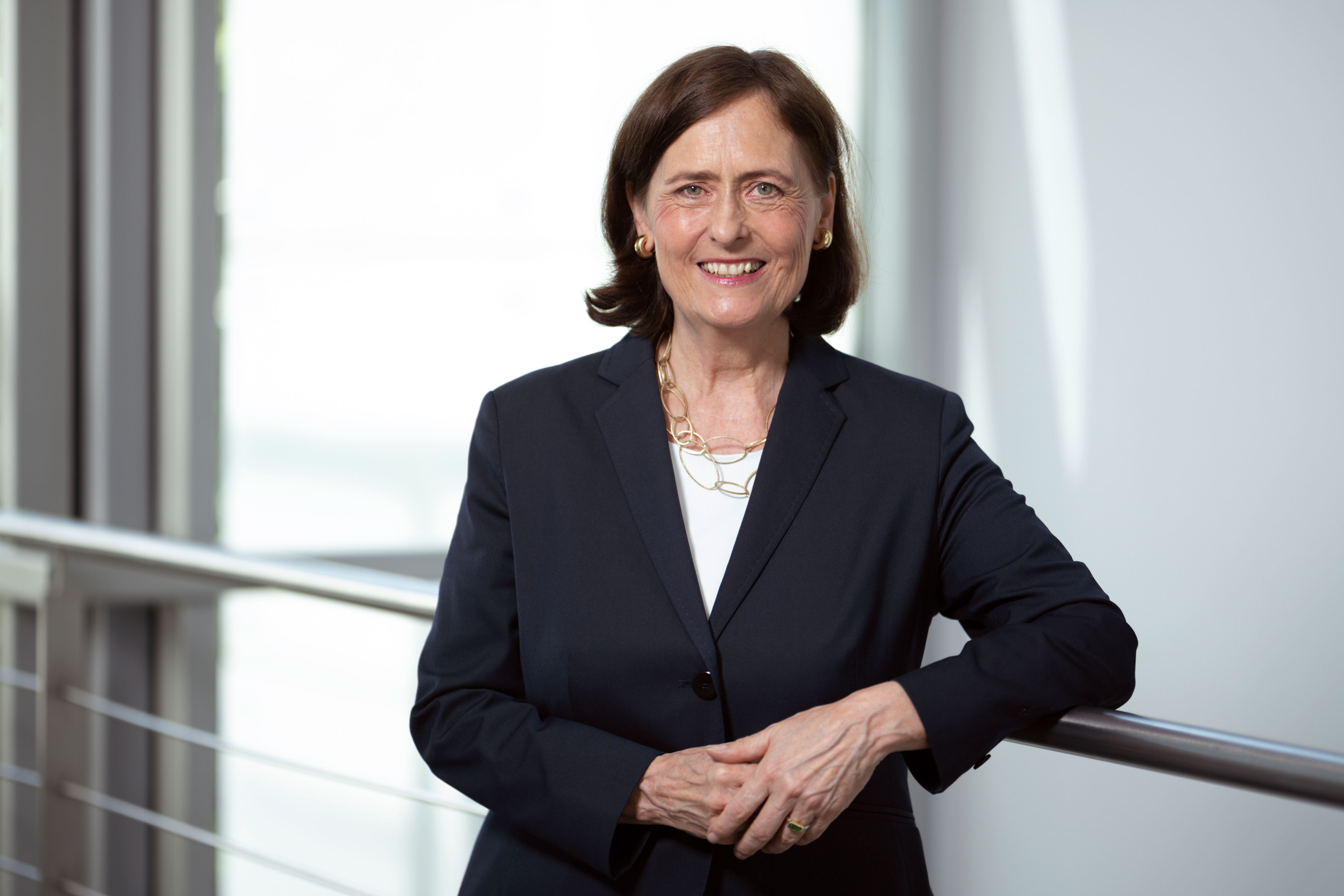
- Occupations: physician and biochemist
- Scientific career
- Thesis: Glutathione reductase and its apoenzyme: contributions to malaria chemotherapy and to diagnosing FAD deficiencies

Katja Becker (born 7 March 1965, also known as Katja Becker-Brandenburg in some older publications) is a German physician and biochemist who has been serving as the president of the German Research Foundation (DFG) since 2020. She had previously been the organization's vice president from 2014 to 2019.

From 2009 to 2012 Becker was the vice president for research at Justus Liebig University in Giessen, Germany. From 2015 to 2017 she was a German representative on the scientific committee of the European Cooperation in Science and Technology (COST).

== Early life and education ==
Becker studied medicine at Ruprecht Karls University in Heidelberg, Germany, from 1984 to 1991. In 1988 she received her doctorate (summa cum laude) under the tutelage of R. Heiner Schirmer. The topic of her dissertation was "Glutathione reductase and its apoenzyme: contributions to malaria chemotherapy and to diagnosing FAD deficiencies" (German: Glutathionreduktase und ihr Apoenzym: Beiträge zur Chemotherapie der Malaria und zur Diagnostik von FAD-Mangelzuständen). She completed her university professor qualification (German: Habilitation) in 1996 in the field of biochemistry at the medical faculty of the University of Heidelberg.

== Career ==
After completing her medical residency at John Radcliffe Hospital in Oxford and the University Hospital of Basel, Becker gained clinical and research experience in Nigeria and Ghana and worked as a postdoctoral fellow at the University of Sydney. She qualified as a medical specialist in biochemistry at Heidelberg University in 1998.

Becker subsequently worked as a senior research fellow at the Biochemistry Center of Heidelberg University. In 1999 Julius Maximilians University in Würzburg appointed her to an associate professorship in the Research Center for Infectious Diseases (German: Zentrum für Infektionsforschung).

In 2000, Justus Liebig University in Giessen appointed her to a full professorship in Biochemistry and Molecular Biology at the Interdisciplinary Research Center (German: Interdisziplinäres Forschungszentrum für biowissenschaftliche Grundlagen der Umweltsicherung (IFZ)). Most of her research focus is on the role of oxidative stress and antioxidative protective mechanisms during disease development and on developing new drugs to fight tumorous and infectious diseases, especially malaria. In 2006 she spent six months at the Scripps Research Institute for a research stay.

From 2000 until 2005, Becker was a member of the Junge Akademie, part of the Berlin-Brandenburg Academy of Sciences and the Leopoldina Academy. Since June 2009 she has been a full member of the Leopoldina Academy, one of its youngest so far.

On 21 October 2009 Becker became the first woman ever to be elected to the vice presidency of the University of Giessen, serving her three-year term from 1 November 2009 to 31 October 2012.

Since 2014, Becker has been the coordinator of DFG Priority Program 1710, "Dynamics of Thiol-based Redox Switches in Cellular Physiology." Since 2018 she has been the coordinator of the LOEWE Center DRUID (Novel Drug Targets against Poverty-related and Neglected Tropical Infectious Diseases) as part of the Hessian State initiative to fund academic-economic excellence (LandesOffensive zur Entwicklung Wissenschaftlich-ökonomischer Exzellenz - LOEWE).

On 3 July 2019 Becker was elected as president of the German Research Foundation, thereby becoming the first female to hold this post. In the year-long selection process, she won over Wolfgang Marquardt and Dorothea Wagner. She had been vice president of the German Research Foundation since 2014.

== Other activities ==
Becker is a member of several scientific and political advisory boards, works as an expert reviewer, and organizes academic conferences, including the following:

- Alexander von Humboldt Foundation, Member of the Board of Trustees (since 2020)
- German Future Prize, Member of the Board of Trustees (since 2020)
- Fritz Thyssen Foundation, Member of the Scientific Advisory Board (since 2020)
- German National Academic Foundation, Member of the Board of Trustees (since 2020)
- Center for Infectious Diseases (ZINF), University of Würzburg, Member of the Scientific Advisory Board (2016–2019)

== Recognition ==
For her research and teaching activities, Becker has won multiple awards, including the following:

- 1989 – Ludolf Krehl Prize, awarded by the Southwest German Society of Internal Medicine (for her dissertation)
- 2003 – Carus Medal, awarded by the German National Academy of Sciences Leopoldina
- 2010 – Rudolf Leuckart Medal, awarded by the German Society for Parasitology (for her work on energy metabolism in pathogenic parasites such as the malaria pathogen)

== Selected writings ==
=== Books ===
- Becker, Katja; Engelen, Eva-Maria; Vec, Miloš (1 January 2003), Ethisierung - Ethikferne: Wie viel Ethik braucht die Wissenschaft? (in German) (1st ed.), Berlin: Walter de Gruyter GmbH & Co.KG, p. 243, ISBN 9783050082219
- Becker, Katja; Seltzer, Paul M. (February 2011). Apicomplexan Parasites: Molecular Approaches toward Targeted Drug Development. Drug Discovery in Infectious Diseases. Vol. 2 (1st ed.). Weinheim: Wiley-Blackwell. p. 550. ISBN 978-3-527-32731-7.

=== Journal articles ===
- Kanzok, Stefan M.; Fechner, Anke; Bauer, Holger; Ulschmid, Julia K.; Müller, Hans-Michael; Botella-Munoz, José; Schneuwly, Stephan; Schirmer, R. Heiner; Becker, Katja (26 Jan 2001), "Substitution of the thioredoxin system for glutathione reductase in Drosophila melanogaster", Science, 291 (5504): 643–646, Bibcode:2001Sci...291..643K, doi:10.1126/science.291.5504.643, PMID 11158675
- Becker, Katja; Savvides, Savvas N.; Keese, Michael; Schirmer, R. Heiner; Karplus, P. Andrew (April 1998). "Enzyme inactivation through sulfhydryl oxidation by physiologic NO-carriers". Nature Structural Biology. 5 (4): 267–271. doi:10.1038/nsb0498-267. PMID 9546215. S2CID 20607289.
- Perez-Jimenez, Raul; Li, Jingyuan; Kosuri, Pallav; Sanchez-Romero, Immaculada; Wiita, Arun P.; Rodriguez-Larrea, David; Chueca, Ana; Holmgren, Arne; Miranda-Vizuete, Antonio; Becker, Katja; Cho, Seung-Hyun; Beckwith, Jon; Gelhaye, Eric; Jacquot, Jean P.; Gaucher, Eric A.; Sanchez-Ruiz, Jose M.; Berne, Bruce J.; Fernandez, Julio M. (18 November 2009). "Diversity of chemical mechanisms in thioredoxin catalysis revealed by single-molecule force spectroscopy". Nature Structural & Molecular Biology. 16 (8): 890–896. doi:10.1038/nsmb.1627. PMC 2745927. PMID 19597482.
- Fritz-Wolf, Karin; Kehr, Sebastian; Stumpf, Michaela; Rahlfs, Stefan; Becker, Katja: Crystal structure of the human thioredoxin reductase–thioredoxin complex. Nature Communications 2:383, 2011. doi: 10.1038/ncomms1382.
- Krieg, Reimar; Jortzik, Esther; Goetz, Alice-Anne; Blandine, Stèphanie; Wittlin, Sergio; Elhabiri, Mourad; Rahbari, Mahsa; Nuryyeva, Selbi; Voigt, Kerstin; Dahse, Hans-Martin; Brakhage, Axel; Beckmann, Svenja; Quack, Thomas; Grevelding, Christoph G.; Pinkerton, Anthony B.; Schönecker, Bruno; Burrows, Jeremy; Davioud-Charvet, Elisabeth; Rahlfs, Stefan; Becker, Katja: Arylmethylamino steroids as antiparasitic agents. Nature Communications 8:14478, 2017. doi: 10.1038/ncomms14478.
