= Industry funding of academic research =

Industry funding of academic research in the United States is one of the two major sources of research funding in academia along with government support. Currently, private funding of research accounts for the majority of all research and development funding in the United States as of 2007 overall. Overall, Federal and Industrial sources contribute similar amounts to research, while industry funds the vast majority of development work.

While the majority of industry research is performed in-house, a major portion of this private research funding is directed to research in non-profit academic centers. As of 1999, industrial sources accounted for an estimated $2.2 billion of academic research funding in the US. However, there is little governmental oversight or tracking of industry funding on academic science and figures of the scale of industry research are often estimated by self-reporting and surveys which can be somewhat unreliable.

Much of this industry funding of academic research is directed toward applied research. However, by some accounts, industry may even fund up to 40% of basic research in the United States, with Federal funding of basic research falling below 50%, although this figure does not consider where this research is conducted. The role for funding of academic research from industrial sources has received much attention both in a historical and contemporary perspective. The practice has received both extensive political praise and scholarly criticism.

== History ==
Research in the US prior to World War II, heavily relied on funding from private sources without major organized federal research programs or either the scientists’ or associates’ personal funds. During WWII, governmental investment in research was widely regarded as a major contributor to military success and support for research was politically favorable. Following WW2, federal research funding in both Europe and the US increased in terms of relative percent of funding for research and absolute amount. Overall, the growth of industrial research funding has greatly outpaced public research funding growth, with US governmental research funding increasing by an average of 3.4% annually, while industrial research funding increased by an average of 5.4% annually from 1950 to 2004.

Since WW2, industry funding of science has consistently represented the second largest source of funding for academic science. Industry funding of academic science did expand during the 1980s and 1990s following the passing of the Bayh–Dole Act and a variety of both State and Federal proposals to increase funding for joint industry academic partnerships. In the 2000s there has been a small retraction of industry funding for academic science while overall industry R&D funding has expanded. ). However, industry funding may be broadening its scope as industry funding of basic science increasing dramatically over that same period, but much of this funding remains in-house.

Culturally, attitudes towards the industrial funding of academic research have changed over time. Within universities, commercial activities and industry funding were often spurned in the 19th century. More recently, commercializing scientific activity is viewed more favorably with extensive political and university support of translating scientific discovery into economic output. However, within the research community and the public, industrial funding of research remains controversial. The universality of this tangled industry, academic, and governmental exchange of funding and research adventures has led researchers to term this model of R&D the Triple Helix.

== Types of industrially funded academic research ==
University-industry partnerships can take on a variety of forms. On the smallest scale, individual research labs or researchers can partner with industry sources for funding. The details of such partnerships can differ substantially with any number of motives ranging from the academic lab testing of previously developed products, to performing early stage basic research related to industry research objectives, or even to individual researchers supporting their salary by consulting on related research problems in industry. While many such partnerships exist, due to their informal nature and resulting lack of record, it is difficult to track how extensive and impactful such relationships are, with most relying on surveys and other self-reporting measures. By closest approximation, according to the Research Value Mapping Survey, 17% of academics at major US research universities report receive grants from industry sources supporting their research.

Far more extensively, in many fields and countries, a narrow majority of academic scientists report having some soft industry relationships, primarily through consulting. Such informal industry academic relationships have a long-standing tradition as they served as a major source of funding for individual labs prior to WW2. In many cases, it was expected that researchers would pursue such relationships as this was expected to be a major source of funding for researcher’s salaries. Despite greatly expanded post-WW2 federal support for research, so called soft money salary support from industry remains a large and growing aspect of academic research salaries.

=== University Industry Research Centers (UIRCs) ===
On a larger scale, there have been numerous attempts to create collaborative University-Industry Research Centers (UIRCs) to jointly host academic and industry researchers to address industry problems with direct, large scale collaborative centers. Early forms of UIRCS started in the 1950s and 1960s with the formation of research parks with industry sponsors. In the 1970s, there were multiple proposals at the federal level in the US to help fund and expand early UIRCs. However, funding fell through at multiple points.

The first UIRCs experienced difficulties in bridging the differences between academic and industrial culture. One such attempt occurred at Caltech where Caltech researchers partnered with Xerox and IBM through the Silicon Structures Project. Both industry and academic partners were concerned about the cultures of the other and found the structure ineffective. With such frustrations, it was difficult to secure partners to continue expanding UIRCs.

In the late 1970s, RPI created two three new UIRCs: 1) the Center for Integrated Computer Graphics, which received both NSF and industry support 2) the Center for Manufacturing Productivity and Technology Transfer, which was funded entirely by industry support and 3) the Center for Integrated Electronics, which received unprecedented industry support. These centers were generally regarded as highly successful and made expansion of governmental support for joint industry and academic ventures more favorable. In the early 1980s, states began contributing funding to UIRCs and other industry-academic partnerships to encourage local economic growth from innovation. By the mid-1980s, the federal government expanded financial support for UIRCs.

With mixed governmental and industry support, the UIRCs were more likely to be successful. Over time successful governmentally funded UIRCs could become independent from government support once having demonstrable successes that could continue to incentivize industry to contribute funding more aggressively. UIRCs, coupled to early seeding from both state and federal government, continued to greatly expand during the 1980s and early 1990s, eventually receiving nearly 70% of industry funding of academic research and incentivizing a tripling of industry funding of academic research during the 1980s.

=== Contract Research Organizations (CROs) ===
Contract research has also drawn increasing industry funding, particularly to Contract Research Organizations (CROs) from Biotech and Pharmaceutical corporations. Contract research is a popular form of outsourcing research in industry as industry has more influence over how the study is conducted than in either UIRCs or traditional academic grants. CROs, which are specifically designed for this function have drawn substantial industry clinical research funding away from academia and are growing rapidly.

== Influence and criticisms ==
Much discussion has been placed on the effects of industrial research funding on the behavior of academic research scientists. Concerns center on whether researchers can remain impartial when they are being funded by a for-profit and potentially motivated industrial source, if this funding gives private sources an oversized impact on which research directions are pursued, and the potential negative effects of industrial funding on the openness of science.

A multitude of studies have found that pharmaceutical studies funded by industry organizations are significantly more likely to publish results in favor of the product being supported. This could, in part, be due to the fact that usually when an academic accepts industry funding, particularly when working on an existing product, researchers have to sign non-disclosure agreements which often prevent the publication of negative results and inhibit the openness of science. This could serve to significantly bias scientific results and diminish public trust of science.

There are additionally many scholars who have considered advantages of industrially funded academic research. Generally, increased industry funding may increase academic and industry interaction, prompting greater efficiency in translating and commercializing of science research. This increased commercialization activity from academics could serve as an economic and societal boost as the economy could be bolstered by new products hitting the market, while society could benefit directly from having increased access to the fruits of scientific production. Supporting this, academic science funded by industry sources does result in more patents per dollar, increased licensing of these patents, and even more citations per published paper than research supported by other sources, including federal at the University of California Berkeley.

In Germany, it also appears that applied research funded by industry sources results in a significant increase in patent citations, which could correspond to a serious increase in translation of applied research. Such increase in commercialization and translation of research could provide social and economic benefits. However, it is difficult to determine whether this increase in apparent impact is due to the industry funding itself or is just a read out that industry funds target work that tends to produce more citations per publication as well as more patents.

== Disclosure ==
The Sunshine Act, part of the Affordable Care Act, requires healthcare providers to disclose financial relationships with pharmaceutical companies and medical device manufacturers. This transparency initiative mandates that payments, including consulting fees, travel, research funding, and gifts, be publicly reported in the Open Payments database maintained by the Centers for Medicare & Medicaid Services by companies. The goal is to prevent conflicts of interest and ensure that financial ties do not unduly influence medical decision-making. By making this information accessible, the Sunshine Act promotes accountability and allows patients to make informed choices about their healthcare providers.

Several initiatives have advocated for increased transparency in financial relationships and perceived conflict of interest between academic faculty and their industry partners within medical education. Anand Reddi has advocated that undisclosed conflicts of interest can compromise the objectivity of medical training and influence the content delivered to medical students and trainees. By advocating for voluntary disclosure policies, Reddi has contributed to efforts that aim to uphold integrity and trust in the education of future healthcare professionals both in resolutions at the American Medical Association but also in the peer-reviewed literature and op-eds.

== See also ==
- Funding of science
- Self-Organized Funding Allocation
- Military research
- Junk science
- Public–private partnership
