= R. Heiner Schirmer =

German physician and biochemist

- Born: 1 February 1942; Bremen, Germany
- Died: 20 September 2016 (aged 74)
- Education: University of Heidelberg (Habilitation, 1975), University of Basel, Max Planck Institute for Medical Research (PhD)
- Known for: Principles of Protein Structure (with G. E. Schulz)
- Awards: Dream Action Award of DSM (company)
- Scientific career
- Fields: Biochemistry
- Workplaces: Plymouth Marine Laboratory, England; Ludolf Krehl Clinic, Heidelberg; Dartmouth Medical School, New Hampshire; Max Planck Institute for Medical Research, Heidelberg; University of Heidelberg; Dana–Farber Cancer Institute; University of Michigan
- Thesis: Die Besonderheiten der contractilen Proteine der Arterien (The Distinctive Features of Contractile Proteins in Arteries)
- Doctoral advisor: Johann Caspar Rüegg

Rolf Heiner Schirmer (1 February 1942 – 20 September 2016) was a German physician and biochemist. From 1980 to 2007 he was a professor of biochemistry in the medical faculty of Ruprecht-Karls University in Heidelberg, Germany, and became a professor emeritus.

== Education ==
Schirmer was born in Bremen. He studied medicine and philosophy in Heidelberg and Basel from 1961 to 1966, receiving his doctorate at the Max Planck Institute for Medical Research under the tutelage of Swiss physiologist Johann Caspar Rüegg. The topic of his dissertation was "The Distinctive Features of Contractile Proteins in Arteries" (German: Die Besonderheiten der contractilen Proteine der Arterien). He received his university professor qualification (German Habilitation) in 1975 in biochemistry at the University of Heidelberg.

== Academic career ==
In 1964 he worked on the ion pumps of excitable membranes at the Plymouth Marine Laboratory, England. From 1967 to 1970 he completed his medical residency, mainly in internal medicine. For this he was primarily at the Ludolf Krehl Clinic in Heidelberg but also at Dartmouth Medical School in New Hampshire as a postdoctoral fellow. From 1970 to 1980 he was an assistant professor at the Max Planck Institute for Medical Research, where he, together with Georg E. Schulz, conducted structure-based research on nucleotide-binding enzymes.

In 1980, the University of Heidelberg appointed Schirmer to a professorship in biochemistry in their medical school. His fields of research covered the biochemistry of parasitic cells in malaria and in Chagas disease-induced cardiomyopathy as well as the enzyme structures of redox metabolism as attack points in chemotherapy to treat parasitic diseases. From 1987 onward, he worked at the Dana–Farber Cancer Institute and at the University of Michigan during his research sabbaticals. From 1992 to 1993 he served as dean for the Faculty of Scientific Medicine.

== Awards ==
In 2002 Schirmer received the "Dream Action Award" of the Dutch-based chemical corporation DSM for developing and clinically testing drug combinations containing methylene blue to combat malaria in West African children. Since then he has also contributed to the Centre de Recherche en Santé de Nouna (CRSN), Burkina Faso, as one of the founding members.

== Publications ==
=== Books ===
Schulz, G. E., and R. Heiner Schirmer. Principles of Protein Structure. New York: Springer-Verlag, 1979. Also translated into Japanese (タンパク質 : 構造・機能・進化 / Tanpakushits) and Russian, According to WorldCat, the book is held in 749 libraries

=== Most highly cited journal articles ===
Gromer, Stefan; Arscott, L. David; Williams, Charles H.; Schirmer, R. Heiner; Becker, Katja (August 7, 1998), "Human placenta thioredoxin reductase. Isolation of the selenoenzyme, steady state kinetics, and inhibition by therapeutic gold compounds", Journal of Biological Chemistry, 273 (32): 20096–20101, doi:10.1074/jbc.273.32.20096, PMID 9685351 According to Google Scholar, this paper has been cited 406 times.

Schirmer, R. Heiner; Müller, Joachim G.; Krauth-Siegel, R. Luise (3 February 1995), "Disulfide-reductase inhibitors as chemotherapeutic agents: The design of drugs for trypanosomiasis and malaria", Angewandte Chemie International Edition in English, 34 (2): 141–154, doi:10.1002/anie.199501411 According to Google Scholar, the paper has been cited 222 times.

Kanzok, Stefan M.; Fechner, Anke; Bauer, Holger; Ulschmid, Julia K.; Müller, Hans-Michael; Botella-Munoz, José; Schneuwly, Stephan; Schirmer, R. Heiner; Becker, Katja (26 Jan 2001), "Substitution of the thioredoxin system for glutathione reductase in Drosophila melanogaster", Science, 291 (5504): 643–646, Bibcode:2001Sci...291..643K, doi:10.1126/science.291.5504.643, PMID 11158675 According to Google Scholar, it has been cited 336 times.

== See also ==
- Curriculum vitae of R. Heiner Schirmer in the Biochemistry Center of the |University of Heidelberg
- R. Heiner Schirmer's research group
