= National Research Foundation =

National Research Foundation may refer to:

- National Research Foundation (Greece)
- National Research Foundation (India)
- National Research Foundation (United Arab Emirates), a foundation to promote research activity in the United Arab Emirates
- National Research Foundation (South Africa), the intermediary agency between the Government of South Africa and South Africa's research institutions
- National Research Foundation of Korea
- National Hellenic Research Foundation
