= Fred Ray Cagle =

American herpetologist (1915–1968)

- Born: October 9, 1915; Marion, Illinois, U.S.
- Died: August 8, 1968 (aged 52); New Orleans, Louisiana, U.S.
- Education: Southern Illinois University Carbondale; University of Michigan
- Known for: Research on turtles, especially Trachemys scripta elegans
- Scientific career
- Fields: Herpetology
- Workplaces: Southern Illinois University Carbondale; Tulane University
- Doctoral advisor: Norman Edouard Hartweg
- Author abbrev. (zoology): Cagle

Fred Ray Cagle, often written as Fred R. Cagle, (October 9, 1915 – August 8, 1968) was an American herpetologist and professor who specialized in the study of turtles.

== Biography ==
Cagle was the youngest of four children of Fred and Agnes Cagle (née Guiney). From an early age he showed an interest in dissecting frogs and kept live specimens in the family workshop. When Cagle was twelve years old, his father was killed in a natural gas explosion in a coal mine. With financial support from his siblings Clarence and Mary, Cagle was able to attend college during the Great Depression.

He earned a Bachelor of Education degree in 1937 from the Southern Illinois Normal University (now Southern Illinois University Carbondale). In June 1938, he married Josephine Alexander, with whom he had a son and a daughter. That same year, he received his Master of Science and in 1943 completed his Ph.D. at the University of Michigan under the supervision of Norman Edouard Hartweg with the dissertation The growth of the slider turtle Pseudemys scripta elegans. For this research, he conducted field studies on the red-eared slider between 1939 and 1941 in southern Illinois, while also serving as lecturer and museum director at Southern Illinois Normal University.

During World War II, Cagle served three years in the United States Air Force, where he trained pilots in the physiological demands of high-altitude flight, eventually attaining the rank of Captain.

In 1946 he joined Tulane University, where he remained until his death in 1968. He became chair of the zoology department in 1952, research coordinator in 1959, and vice president of the university in 1963. In the latter position, he oversaw institutional development, public and governmental relations, alumni activities, and the administration of research programs.

Between 1937 and 1955, Cagle published about 40 scientific papers on the systematics, behavior, and biology of amphibians and reptiles. His major works included studies on turtle navigation and migration, a study on the subspecies Trachemys scripta troostii, and the description of four new taxa of the genus Graptemys (map turtles). In 1957 he contributed the reptile chapter to the textbook Vertebrates of the United States by W. Frank Blair, Albert P. Blair, Pierce Brodkorb, and George A. Moore.

His most influential papers were An Outline for the Study of a Reptile Life History (1953) and An Outline for the Study of an Amphibian Life History (1956), both published in Tulane Studies in Zoology and Botany. Cagle served as editor for Copeia, Biological Abstracts, and American Midland Naturalist.

He was active in many national and international organizations. From 1962 to 1968 he was a member of the Library of Congress, a board member of the Gulf Universities Research Corporation, and a member of the National Research Council of the National Academy of Sciences. He also belonged to the Herpetologists' League, American Association for the Advancement of Science, Southwestern Association of Naturalists, American Society of Naturalists, National Council of University Research Administrators, American Society of Ichthyologists and Herpetologists (vice president, 1953–1955), American Society of Mammalogists, The Wildlife Society, Society for the Study of Evolution, Society of Systematic Zoology, Ecological Society of America, Nederlandse Vereniging voor Herpetologie en Terrariumkunde, British Herpetological Society, and the American Institute of Biological Sciences (board member, 1957–1962).

Cagle died in August 1968 at the age of 52 from a cerebral aneurysm.

== Eponymy ==
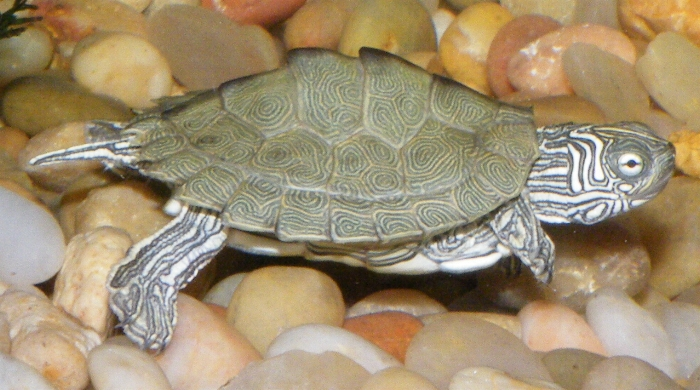
The endangered Graptemys caglei was named in his honor

In 1974, David P. Haynes and Ronald R. McKown named the endangered Cagle's map turtle (Graptemys caglei) of Texas in his honor.
