= Cost per paper =

Total money spent on one research paper

Cost Per Paper (CPP) means the total money spent on one research paper, the money is accounted from the National Natural Science Foundation (NSFC). CPP can be used to measure the level of scientific research, which means the bigger CPP value and the better research.

== History ==
The "CPP" conception was raised by Jianguo Gao (高建国) when he analyzed the characteristics of elevated Cost Per Paper of Zhejiang Normal University.
