= Ralph of Coggeshall =

12th- and 13th-century monk, abbot and chronicler

- Died: 1227
- Occupation: Chronicler
- Writing career
- Subject: English history
- Notable work: Chronicon Anglicanum

Ralph of Coggeshall (died after 1227), English chronicler, was at first a monk and afterwards sixth abbot (1207–1218) of Coggeshall Abbey, an Essex foundation of the Cistercian order. He is also known for his chronicles on the Third Crusade and of Gerard of Ridefort.

== Chronicon Anglicanum ==
Ralph himself tells us these facts; and that his resignation of the abbacy was made against the wishes of the brethren, in consequence of his bad health. He took up and continued a Chronicon Anglicanum belonging to his house; the original work begins at 1066, his own share at 1187. He hoped to reach the year 1227, but his autograph copy breaks off three years earlier.

Ralph makes no pretensions to be a literary artist. Where he had a written authority before him he was content to reproduce even the phraseology of his original. At other times he strings together in chronological order, without any links of connection, the anecdotes which he gathered from chance visitors.

Unlike Benedictus Abbas and Roger of Hoveden, he makes little use of documents; only three letters are quoted in his work. On the other hand, the corrections and erasures of the autograph show that he took pains to verify his details; and his informants are sometimes worthy of exceptional confidence. Thus he vouches Richard's chaplain Anselm for the story of the king's capture by Leopold of Austria.

The tone of the chronicle is usually dispassionate; but the original text contained some personal strictures upon Prince John, which are reproduced in Roger of Wendover. The admiration with which Ralph regarded Henry II is attested by his edition of Ralph Niger's chronicle; here, under the year 1161, he replies to the intemperate criticisms of the original author. However, Ralph's role in editing Niger's chronicle is now disputed, and it is believed that a monk at the nearby monastery of St Osyth's made the amendment. On Richard I the abbot passes a judicious verdict, admitting the great qualities of that king, but arguing that his character degenerated. Towards John alone Ralph is uniformly hostile; as a Cistercian and an adherent of the Mandeville family he could hardly be otherwise.

Ralph refers in the Chronicon (s.a. 1091) to a book of visions and miracles which he had compiled, but this is no longer extant. He also wrote a continuation of Niger's chronicle, extending from 1162 to 1178 (printed in R. Anstruther's edition of Niger, London, 1851), and short annals from 1066 to 1223.

The autograph manuscript of the Chronicon Anglicanum is to be found in the British Library (Cotton, Vespasian D. X). The same volume contains the continuation of Ralph Niger. The Chronicon Terrae Sanctae, formerly attributed to Ralph, is by another hand; it was among the sources on which he drew for the Chronicon Anglicanum. The so-called Libellus de motibus anglicanis sub rege Johanne (printed by Martène and Durand, Ampl. Collectio, v. pp. 871–882) is merely an excerpt from the Chronicon Anglicanum. This latter work was edited for the Rolls Series in 1875 by Joseph Stevenson.
