= Research Foundation – Flanders (FWO) =

Belgian public research council

- Fonds voor Wetenschappelijk Onderzoek – Vlaanderen
- Abbreviation: FWO
- Predecessor: National Fund for Scientific Research (NFWO/FNRS)
- Formation: 2006 [1928]
- Purpose: Research funding
- Headquarters: Brussels
- Location: Egmontstraat 5, 1000 Brussel, Belgium
- Region served: Flanders
- Official language: Dutch, English
- President: Bruno Blondé
- Secretary General: Hans Willems
- Website: FWO

The Research Foundation – Flanders (FWO; Dutch: Fonds voor Wetenschappelijk Onderzoek – Vlaanderen) is a Belgian public research council, based in Brussels. The Flemish research council aims to sponsor ground-breaking research and innovation. Much of this work involves supporting researchers and undertakings in association with the universities and institutes of Flanders, including Ghent University, University of Leuven, University of Antwerp, Free University of Brussels and Hasselt University.

== History ==
The FWO is a successor to the Belgian National Fund for Scientific Research (NFWO / FNRS), which had been founded in 1928, after the call from King Albert I of Belgium for the promotion of research and innovation.

In 2006, the National Fund for Scientific Research (NFWO / FNRS) divided into two organisations: the FWO, for the Flemish community, and the F.R.S.-FNRS (French: Fonds de la Recherche Scientifique – FNRS) for the French-speaking region. A self-governing organization, the Research Foundation – Flanders is located in Brussels and financed by the Flemish government, the federal government, and the national lottery, with further support coming from partner institutes and companies.

== Function ==
The FWO supports research in science, engineering, and the humanities through a variety of frameworks. It offers competitive funding for doctoral and postdoctoral fellowships as well as for research grants, specific projects, and infrastructure. Moreover, the FWO funds international mobility and collaboration. Together with a number of partners, it also bestows scientific prizes.

== Organisation ==
=== Regular funding ===
The FWO organises a total of 31 expert panels, 30 specialist and one interdisciplinary. These panels advise the Senate and the Board of Trustees on matters of funding.

- Biological sciences
  1. Molecular and cellular biology
  2. Functional biology
  3. Biodiversity and ecology
  4. Applied biological sciences
- Humanities
  1. Languages
  2. Art, art history, and literature
  3. History and archaeology
  4. Theology and religious studies
  5. Philosophy and ethics
- Social sciences
  1. Sciences of law and criminology
  2. Economics, business economics and management
  3. Psychology, pedagogy, didactics, and social work
  4. Social, political, and communication sciences
- Medical sciences
  1. Pharmaceutical sciences and medical biochemistry
  2. Genetics, functional genome research, bio-informatics science, developmental biology
  3. Microbiology and immunology
  4. Cancer research
  5. Neuroscience, clinical neurology, psychiatry, musculoskeletal research, rheumatology, orthopaedics, and dermatology
  6. Gastroenterology, hepatology, endocrinology, metabolism and nutrition, reproduction, and urogenital system
  7. Health sciences
- Science and technology
  1. Mathematical sciences
  2. Physics
  3. Condensed matter and physical chemistry
  4. Chemistry
  5. Informatics and knowledge technology
  6. Chemical engineering, material sciences
  7. Energy, electrical engineering, electronics, and mechanics
  8. Sciences of the earth and space
  9. Science and technology of construction and the build environment
- Interdisciplinary

=== Special committees ===
The FWO also organises special committees to advise on support for international collaboration, research infrastructure, and other special mandates.

== International profile ==
The FWO is a member of Science Europe and collaborates in many European research organisations.

In addition, it has created partnerships with numerous counterparts across the globe, such as the French Centre national de la recherche scientifique (CNRS), Dutch Netherlands Organisation for Scientific Research (NWO), Japan Society for the Promotion of Science, Polish Academy of Sciences, and National Natural Science Foundation of China.

== Examples of projects supported ==
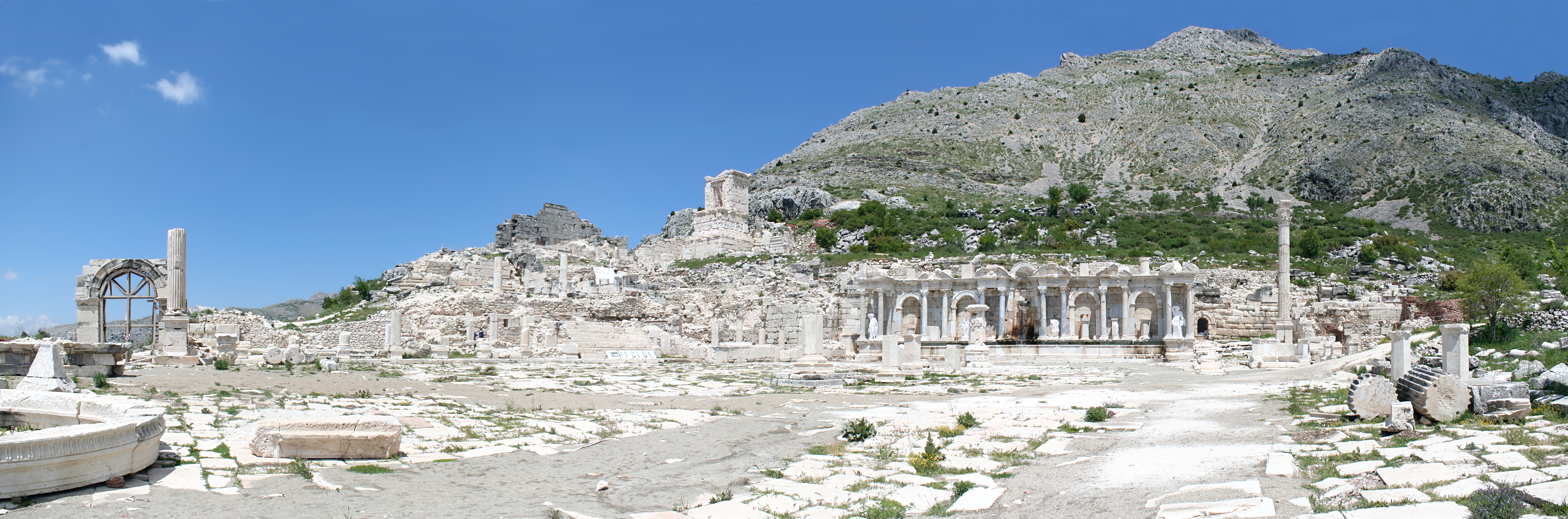
Excavations in Sagalassos, started in 1990

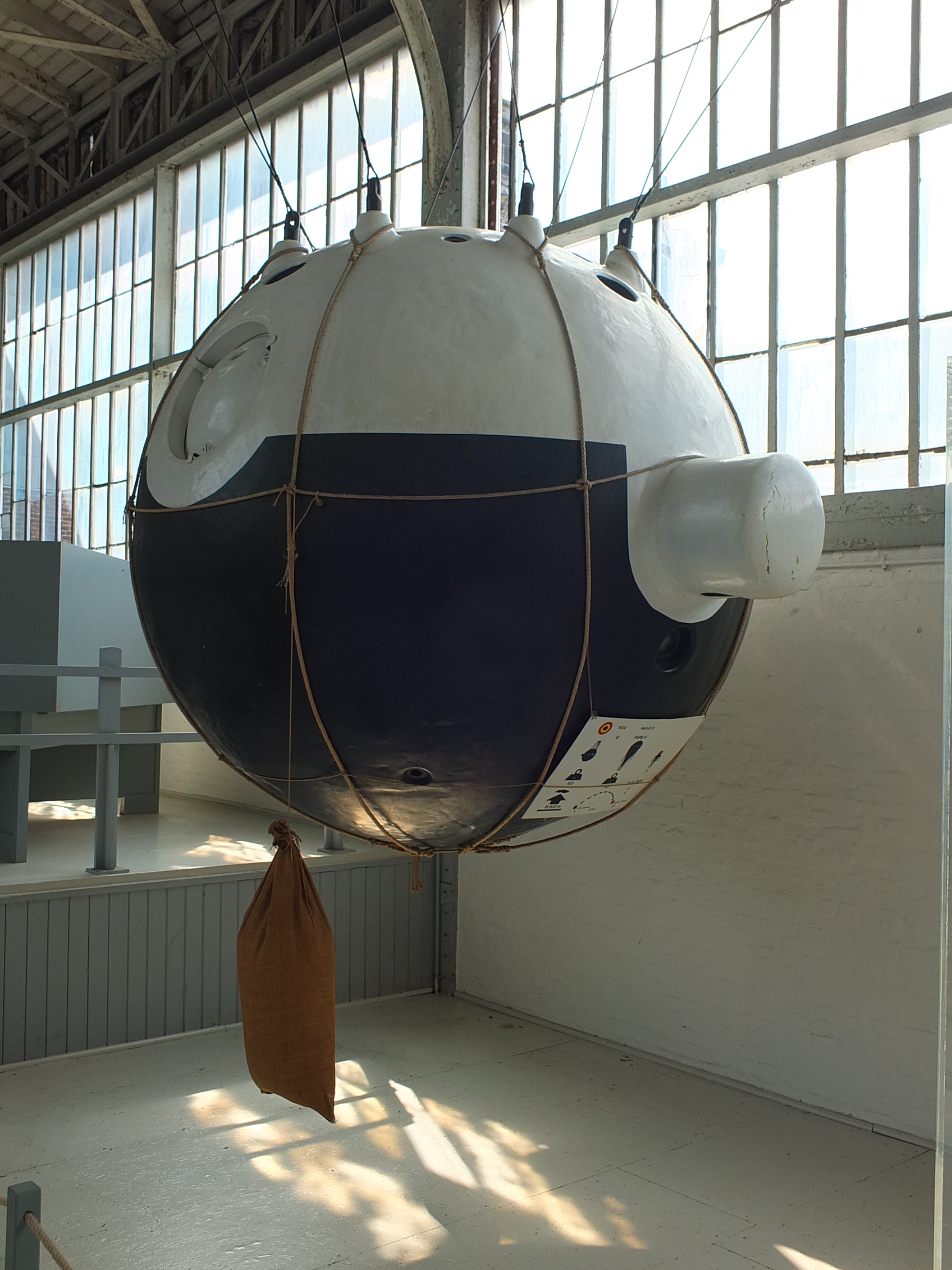
The 1931 FNRS-1, a balloon that set an altitude record, designed by Auguste Piccard

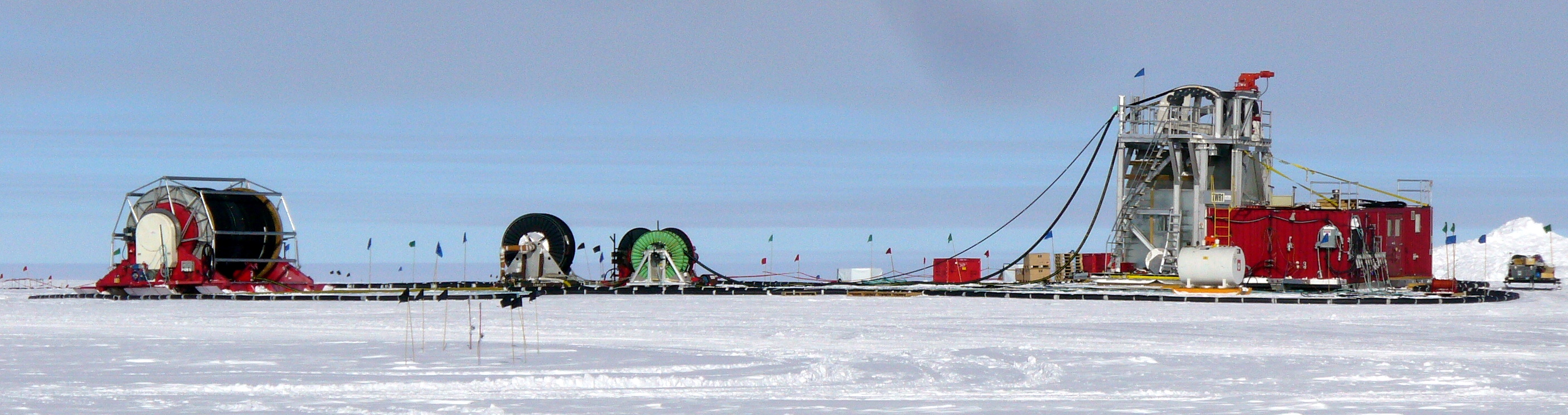
Participation in the IceCube Neutrino Observatory, starting in 2000

== See also ==
- Funding of science
- National Fund for Scientific Research
