= Science Fund of the Republic of Serbia =

- Фонд за науку Републике Србије; Fond za nauku Republike Srbije
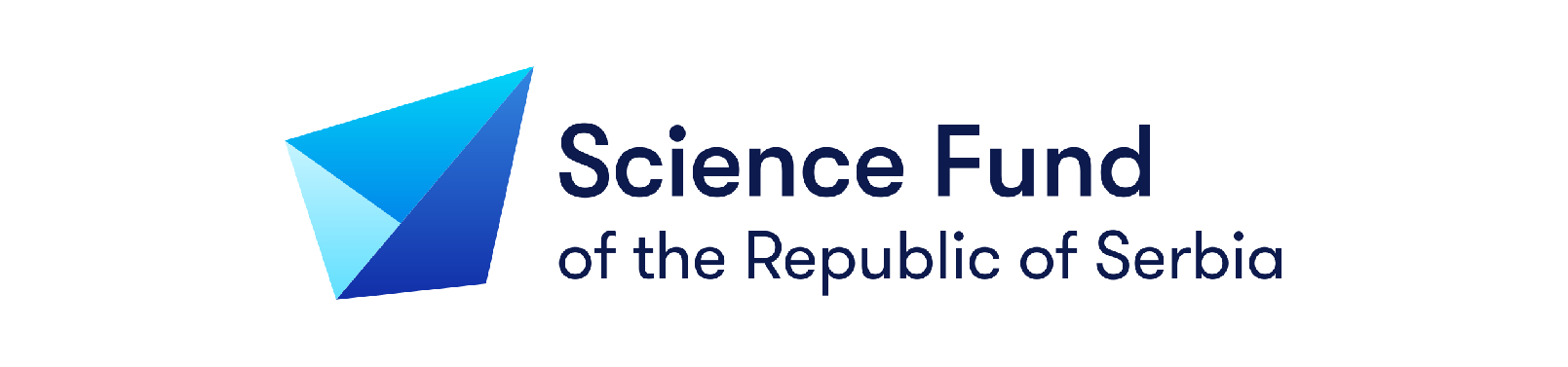

Science Fund overview
- Formed: January 2019; 7 years ago
- Jurisdiction: Ministry of Science, Technological Development and Innovation (Serbia)
- Headquarters: Nemanjina Street 22–26, Belgrade, Serbia; 44°48′15.1″N 20°27′43.6″E
- Website: www.fondzanauku.gov.rs

Science Fund of the Republic of Serbia is a public organization that provides support for science and research activities in the Republic of Serbia. It was founded with the aim of providing support and conditions for the continuous development of scientific research and development activities in the Republic of Serbia, necessary for the progress of a knowledge-based society.

Activities are implemented through scientific, technological and development programs to achieve the strategic goals of the scientific and technological development of the Republic of Serbia.

As part of the Fund's program, projects are financed through public calls. The projects ensure a high scientific level and innovative results, competitiveness at the international level and relevance in relation to the challenges of society.

The Law on the Fund for Science of the Republic of Serbia was adopted in December 2018, and the Fund began its work in March 2019.

== About Science Fund ==
=== Establishment of the Science Fund ===
The Science Fund of the Republic of Serbia was established by the Government of the Republic of Serbia with the aim of establishing a mechanism for project financing of science and scientific research. This decision is in line with the commitment of the Republic of Serbia to advance the development of science and improve the quality of scientific research in accordance with the highest international standards.

The Science Fund began operating on March 12, 2019, with the aim of providing financial resources and creating conditions for the implementation of scientific research projects in all scientific fields, through competitive and transparent procedures.

The work of the Science Fund of the Republic of Serbia is monitored by the Ministry of Science, Innovation and Technological Development, and it is based on the Law on Science and Research, the Law on the Science Fund of the Republic of Serbia, the Statute of the Science Fund of the Republic of Serbia, as well as acts of the Science Fund that are more closely defining procedures within which the Science Fund carries out its activities. The Science Fund supports projects with sustainable goals, clear concepts and systematic and well-designed work methodologies. High scientific excellence, quality and innovative ideas represent the basic values of all projects supported by the Science Fund of the Republic of Serbia.

=== Evaluation procedure ===
Within the Programs of the Science Fund, projects are funded through public bidding. The projects aim to provide high-level research impact, innovative results, competitiveness at the international level, and relevance to society in general.

The entire procedure of project evaluation and selection is based on three criteria - excellence, impact and implementation. The goal of the procedures is to ensure the selection of the best and highest quality project proposals, the implementation of which will bring results of importance and impact on the entire society.

Project Evaluation is carried out in two levels. The received project proposals are checked and evaluated through a procedure consisting of administrative verification and two levels of evaluation. The proposal that has passed the administrative check is sent to the first stage of the evaluation procedure.

First stage of evaluation - Each Proposal is evaluated by peer reviewers, foreign internationally acclaimed experts, which are assessed by the three criteria: excellence, impact, and implementation of the Project Proposal. The proposals are ranked after the first stage of evaluation. Proposals that have passed the first stage of evaluation and whose individual budgets in total do not exceed the double budget provided by the Program funding are being proceeded to the second stage of evaluation.

Second stage of evaluation - The members of the Program Board are foreign experts with an internationally recognized professional career. The Program Board performs evaluation of all proposals that qualify for the second stage of evaluation. Based on the final evaluation, the Program Board forms the ranking list of Project Proposals that have passed both levels of evaluation and will be funded within the available funds of the Program. The final ranking list needs to be accepted by the Scientific Council and adopted by the Managing Board of the Science Fund.

Transparency of the Expert Selection - The Call for Expression of Interest for Peer Reviewers is permanently open. The Call for the Program Board members is specially designed and published for every program. All calls comprise inclusion, exclusion, and assessment criteria, as well as detailed Terms of Reference which are published on the website, social networks, and advertised on professional networks and platforms for researchers.

Publishing the Results - The Science Fund of the Republic of Serbia publishes all results on its website, showing the final ranking list with all project proposals which are approved for funding, project partners, final scores, and approved budgets.

== Bodies of the Science Fund ==
The bodies of the Science Fund are: Director, Supervisory Board, Management Board, and Scientific Council of the Fund.

The Director is appointed and dismissed by the Government on the proposal of the Board of Directors, with the prior approval of the Minister. The Director is appointed based on a public competition for a period of four years. The current acting director of the Fund is Dr. Milica Đurić-Jovičić.

The Management Board has five members, one of whom is the president, who are appointed and dismissed by the Government, at the proposal of the Ministry. The members of the management board must have international experience in business covered by the Law, experience in management business and at least 15 years of work experience. The term of the members of the board of directors is four years, with the possibility of another appointment. The President of the board of directors is Dr. Vujo Drndarević.

The Supervisory Board has three members, one of whom is the president, who is appointed and dismissed by the Government, on the proposal of the ministry responsible for scientific research activity, of which at least two members are from the economic and financial profession. The term of members of the Supervisory Board is four years. The supervisory board monitors the material and financial operations of the Fund for Science. President of the supervisory board prof. Dr. Radovan Pejanović.

The Scientific Council is the highest professional and advisory body of the Science Fund. Members of the Scientific Council are appointed by the Minister on the basis of a public invitation, and dismissed in accordance with the Law. The term of members of the Scientific Council is four years, with the possibility of another appointment. The Scientific Council has fifteen members. Scientific Council members must be internationally recognized in their field of science. At least two-thirds of the members of the Scientific Council must hold the highest scientific or teaching position. Academician Stevan Pilipović is the president of the Scientific Council.

== Programs of the Science Fund ==
Program for Excellent Projects of Young Researchers (PROMIS)

The Program for Excellent Projects of Young Researchers (PROMIS) is a program of the Science Fund of the Republic of Serbia intended for excellent projects of young researchers in the early stages of their careers.

The goals of the PROMIS program are to involve excellent young researchers in scientific research work, to strengthen their professional capacities, to train young doctors of science to manage projects, to train young researchers to apply for other research and development projects, to create new project teams, to support excellent ideas and to support scientific research work that will have a positive impact on society and the economy.

As part of the first PROMIS program announced by the Science Fund, 59 basic and applied research projects were selected, which will be implemented in the period 2020–2022.

Fields of science: natural sciences, engineering and technology, medicine, biotechnologies, as well as social sciences and humanities.

Program budget: EUR 8.9 million

Program for Development of Projects in the Field of Artificial Intelligence (PRVI)

The Program for Development of Projects in the Field of Artificial Intelligence is realized within two subprograms, one intended for basic and the other for applied research in the field of artificial intelligence.

The goals of the program are to encourage the excellence and relevance of scientific research in Serbia in the field of artificial intelligence, to encourage the application of the results of scientific research in the field of artificial intelligence in the development of the Serbian economy.

The main thematic areas of the program are: general artificial intelligence, machine learning, natural language processing, planning, understanding of knowledge, computer vision and speech communication, and intelligent systems.

The Science Fund of the Republic of Serbia finances 12 projects within the Program for the Development of Projects in the Field of Artificial Intelligence.

Six research projects were selected from the basic research subprogram, which will provide a concrete contribution to the development of agriculture, information technologies, energy, modern industry, and environmental protection. Also, six projects were selected from the applied research subprogram that should contribute to the development of science. The projects are implemented in the period 2020–2022.

Program budget: EUR 2.2 million

Special Research Program on COVID-19

The Special Research Program on COVID-19 aims to finance projects that will contribute to an effective scientific response to the COVID-19 pandemic caused by the SARS-CoV-2 virus and enable better preparedness and response of society to this pandemic.

The program was initiated and prepared under the circumstances of the state of emergency declared in the Republic of Serbia due to the COVID-19 pandemic. Bearing in mind the importance of including the scientific community, this Program has a special strategic importance for the Republic of Serbia and its citizens.

The Science Fund of the Republic of Serbia finances 14 projects within the Special Research Program on COVID-19. The projects are implemented in the period 2020–2022. years.

Projects from the following fields of science were approved: 11 from the field of biomedical sciences, 2 from the field of economic, sociological, psychological research and management of complex systems, 1 project from the field of engineering and information technology.

Program budget: EUR 2,000,000

Program IDEAS

The Program IDEAS is the largest program of the Science Fund of the RS. The Program IDEAS enables the financing of projects based on excellent ideas that may in the future have a significant impact on the development of science and research, the economy and/or society as a whole, the involvement of excellent researchers in scientific research work, the strengthening of the professional capacities of researchers and the creation of new project teams.

The program enables researchers to define their own research programs, to form their own teams, and to cooperate with relevant laboratories, research centers and the economy in Serbia and in the world. The program supports basic and applied research in all scientific fields. The program is implemented within four subprograms for the development of scientific research in the following scientific fields: natural sciences; technical and technological sciences; (bio)medical sciences; social sciences and humanities.

Program budget: EUR 30,000,000

The Serbian Science and Diaspora Collaboration Program / International mobility and cooperation

The Serbian Science and Diaspora Collaboration Program is a financial incentive that enables scientific research organizations to develop cooperation with the Serbian diaspora and improve their capacities through short-term visits by researchers from Serbia to diaspora experts and support for joint activities.

The goal of the Program is to establish cooperation with the diaspora for the purpose of improving and exchanging knowledge, establishing or improving cooperation, joint work on scientific-research and research-development problems and challenges, publication of joint works and patents, support for the development of new services, commercialization of products, technology transfer, as well as and preparation of joint project proposals for applying to funds outside Serbia. The program supports basic and applied research in all research areas, without predefined priority topics.

92 projects were approved as part of the Serbian Science and Diaspora Collaboration Program. The projects will be implemented in cooperation with scientific research organizations from 22 countries of the world. The projects will be implemented in partnership with researchers from the diaspora and their scientific research organizations.

Program budget: EUR 800,000

Program IDENTITIES

The Program IDENTITIES is the first program fully dedicated to the development of basic and applied research in the field of social sciences and humanities.

The goals of the Program are: encouraging the excellence and relevance of scientific research in Serbia in the field of social and humanities; affirmation of the importance of social and humanistic sciences for education and society as a whole; improvement of international visibility and cooperation in the subject domain of science.

The program is aligned with the goals of scientific research activities, in terms of creating new knowledge to encourage social, cultural, artistic and economic development, with the aim of preserving and affirming national identity as a part of civilizational heritage and with a research focus on social challenges and priorities.

Program budget: EUR 2,000,000

Green Program of Cooperation between Science and Industry

The general goals of the Program are: practical support for the cooperation of science and the economic sector, based on the use of available scientific potential, by financing projects that can significantly influence the further development of society and the economy as a whole based on the direct application of research results. The specific goals of the Program are to support sustainable development and raise the level of environmental quality, focusing on the following topics: Air, water and soil; Industry; Waste.

The Program is aligned with the EU Strategy "The Road to a Healthy Planet for All" and the EU Action Plan "Towards Zero Pollution of Air, Water and Soil", as well as with relevant national strategic documents.

Program budget: EUR 3,500,000

Program PRISMA

The Program supports basic and applied research projects in all scientific fields. Projects within this Program do not have predetermined topics. The program enables researchers to define their own research topics, to form teams and to cooperate with relevant laboratories, research centers and the economy in the Republic of Serbia and in the world.

In accordance with the goal of involving more young researchers in scientific research projects, within the PRISMA program it was possible to register as team members doctoral students who have not yet been selected for a position, with the obligation to acquire the position before the start of the project implementation.

Program budget: EUR 25,000,000

== Presentation of scientists and scientific projects ==
The Science Fund strives to provide high visibility to all supported projects and research activities. This is one of the ways to encourage researchers and the industry to new partnerships and to expand cooperation at the international level.

The Science Fund of the Republic of Serbia achieves this goal by publishing publications on programs and projects, organizing exhibitions and events dedicated to promoting science, certain scientific fields and topics, as well as participating in various domestic and international gatherings, conferences and fairs where it presents the results and successes of research within the projects funded by the Science Fund.

In addition, the Science Fund regularly works to increase the visibility of projects and their activities and results in the media, providing support for scientists to promote the projects they are implementing, in the media.

== See also ==
Ministry of Science, Technological Development and Innovation

Ministry of Education
