= National Council of University Research Administrators =

Research administrator

NCURA, founded in 1959, is an organization of individuals with professional interests in the administration of sponsored programs (research, education and training), primarily at colleges and universities.

== The formation of NCURA (1958–1960) ==
The National Council of University Research Administrators (NCURA) was initiated in 1958 to aid in the evolution of the profession of Research Administration from that of a part-time job performed by persons with other primary duties into that of a full-time profession with specific requirements. NCURA has been the premier professional association for university research administrators since that time.

== Governance ==
The Council is governed by the Board of Directors, consisting of the President, Vice President, Secretary, Treasurer, Immediate Past President, Executive Director, seven regional elected representatives, four at-large members, and up to three presidential appointments.

=== Presidents ===
1967 William Wheadon, Syracuse University
1968 Donald Murray, University of Pennsylvania
1969 Raymond Woodrow, Princeton University
1970 Sidney Roth, New York University
1971 George R. Holcomb, University of North Carolina at Chapel Hill
1972 David Bacon, Stanford University
1973 John F. Adams, Georgia State University
1974 Clark A. Mccartney, University of Southern California
1975 Perry B. Hendricks Jr., Pacific Lutheran University
1976 Eric R. Rude, University of Wisconsin
1977 Harold B. Hunnicutt, Arizona State University
1978 Margery E. Hoppin, University of Iowa
1979 Truman F. Cook, Southern Methodist University
1980 Dennis W. Barnes, University of Virginia
1981 Frederick Sudermann, Wichita State University
1982 Anthony Merritt, University of Pennsylvania
1983 Mark Elder, University of Oklahoma
1984 Edward L. Maccordy, Washington University in St. Louis
1985 Earl J. Freise, University of Nebraska–Lincoln
1986 Mary Ellen Sheridan, Binghamton University
1987 Allen J. Sinisgalli, Princeton University
1988 Julie T. Norris, University of Houston
1989 Jane A. Youngers, University of Rochester
1990 Frederick Bentley II, Stanford University
1991 Stephen Erickson, Harvard University
1992 Ardis M. Savory, University of South Carolina
1993 Henry O. Hooper, Northern Arizona University
1994 Steven H. Smartt, Vanderbilt University
1995 Richard P. Seligman, University of California, Los Angeles
1996 Kim Moreland, University of Kansas
1997 Steve Hansen, Southern Illinois University at Edwardsville
1998 Mary Husemoller, University of Nevada, Reno
1999 Cheryl Lee Howard, Johns Hopkins University
2000 Nancy Wilkinson, Emory University
2001 Regina H. White, University of Vermont
2002 John Case, University of North Carolina at Chapel Hill
2003 Robert J. Killoren Jr., Pennsylvania State University
2004 Patrick W. Fitzgerald, Massachusetts Institute of Technology
2005 Jerry Fife, Vanderbilt University
2006 Laura Wade, University of Houston
2007 Pamela Whitlock, University of North Carolina at Wilmington
2008 David Mayo, California Institute of Technology
2009 Denise Clark, University of Maryland, College Park
2010 Dave Richardson, Pennsylvania State University
2011 Judy Fredenberg, University of Montana
2012 Dan Nodquist, Washington State University
2013 Patricia Hawk, Oregon State University
2014 Vivian Holmes, Broad Institute of MIT and Harvard
2015 Michelle Vazin, Vanderbilt University
2016 Robert Andersen, University of Wisconsin Madison
2017 Barbara Gray, East Carolina University
2018 Georgette Sakamoto, University of Hawaii
2019 Anthony Ventimiglia, Auburn University

== Activities ==
The NCURA Annual Meeting is a meeting of the NCURA membership. The meeting is a three-day program of concurrent, sessions, discussion groups, and plenary sessions with an additional one to one and a half days of intensive workshops.

NCURA sponsors four on-campus workshops: Fundaments, Financial Research Administration, Departmental Research Administration, and Sponsored Projects Administration II—to travel to campuses across the country and world.

== Publications ==
NCURA Magazine is a member only magazine available both in print and online for all NCURA members, published 6 times a year .

Research Management Review is a scholarly journal, concerned with issues affecting the administration of research and the research environment at the national and international levels.

== Membership ==
Regular membership is available for individuals engaged in administration of sponsored programs in a university or research institution. Associate membership is Available to other individuals whose work is related to the administration of such programs. Emeritus membership is available after their retirement to those who have been members for five years. There are also student affiliates.

== Regions ==
NCURA’s members are organized into eight geographically based regions.
