= Ludwig Schmugge =

German historian

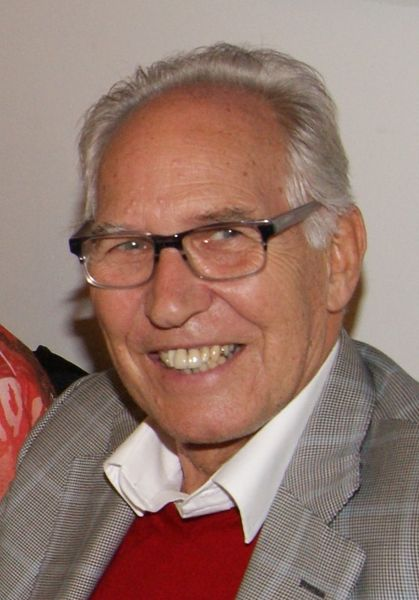
Ludwig Schmugge in 2015

Ludwig Schmugge (born 28 November 1939) is a German historian.

== Life ==
Born in Berlin, Schmugge completed his dissertation on John of Jandun in 1964 in Paris with the help of a six-month scholarship from the Commission for the Study of the History of Franco-German Relations. He was awarded his doctorate in 1965 at the Freie Universität Berlin with this work supervised by Wilhelm Berges. From 1966 to 1971 he was a research assistant at the Friedrich-Meinecke-Institut. In 1971 he was habilitated at the FU Berlin. Schmugge initially taught as professor of medieval history at the FU Berlin. From 1979 until his retirement in 2004, Schmugge taught as a full professor for medieval history at the University of Zurich. In the academic year 1991/1992 he was a research fellow at the Historisches Kolleg in Munich. From 2004 to 2008 Schmugge was chairman of the scientific advisory board of the German Historical Institute in Rome. His main areas of research are constitutional, ecclesiastical and social history of the High and Late Middle Ages as well as canon law. With his dissertation he pursued the goal of compiling and rearranging the scarce sources on the life history of Johannes, of extracting from his works the social-theoretical ideas and then comparing them with those of Marsilius of Padua. Schmugge was for many years editor of the Repertorium Germanicum.

== Writings ==
Monographs

- Ehen vor Gericht. Paare der Renaissance vor dem Papst. Berlin University Press, Berlin 2008, ISBN 978-3-940432-23-0.
- Kirche, Kinder, Karrieren. Päpstliche Dispense von der unehelichen Geburt im Spätmittelalter. Artemis und Winkler, Zürich 1995, ISBN 3-7608-1110-8.
- Schleichwege zu Pfründe und Altar. Päpstliche Dispense vom Geburtsmakel 1449–1533. (Schriften des Historischen Kollegs. Vorträge. Vol. 37). Stiftung Historisches Kolleg, Munich 1994 (Digitalisat).
- Johannes von Jandun (1285/1289–1328). Untersuchungen zur Biographie und Sozialtheorie eines lateinischen Averroisten. Hiersemann, Stuttgart 1966 (online).

Editions

- Illegitimität im Spätmittelalter (Schriften des Historischen Kollegs. Kolloquien. Vol. 29). Oldenbourg, Munich 1994, ISBN 3-486-56069-7 (Numerised).

== Literature ==
- Stanislaw Karol Kubicki, Siegward Lönnendonker (ed.): Die Geschichtswissenschaft an der Freien Universität Berlin. V & R Unipress, Göttingen 2008, ISBN 978-3-89971-475-3, p. 59.
- Andreas Meyer (ed.): Päpste, Pilger, Pönitentiarie. Festschrift für Ludwig Schmugge zum 65. Geburtstag. Niemeyer, Tübingen 2004, ISBN 3-484-80167-0
