= National Research Foundation (United Arab Emirates) =

Foundation to promote research activity in the United Arab Emirates

National Research Foundation UAE
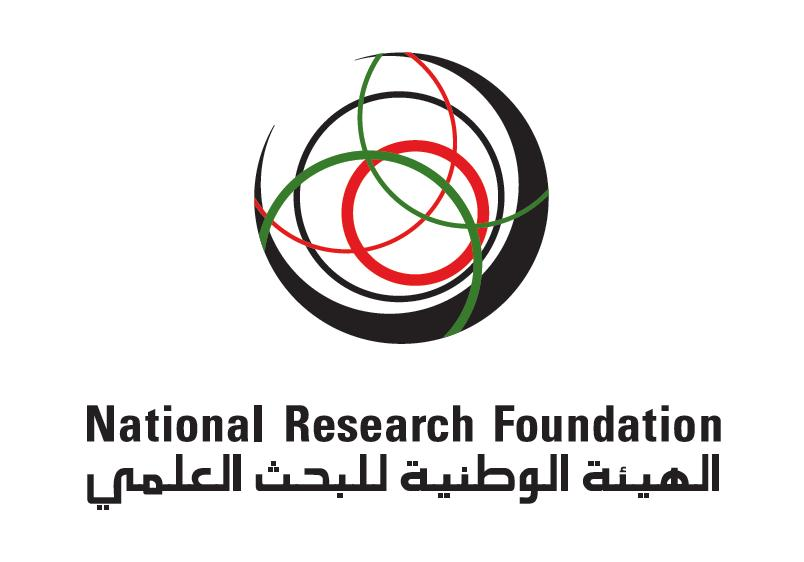
- Formation: 7 March 2008; 18 years ago
- Legal status: Foundation
- Purpose: Funding Research in the UAE
- Headquarters: Knowledge Village, Dubai
- Location: Dubai, United Arab Emirates
- Region served: United Arab Emirates
- Official language: Arabic, English
- Director: Dr. Husam Sultan Al Ulama
- Parent organization: Ministry of Higher Education and Scientific Research
- Website: www.nrf.ae

The National Research Foundation (NRF) is an initiative of the Ministry of Higher Education and Scientific Research in the United Arab Emirates. It was established in 2008 to enhance research activity in the UAE. The NRF provides funding and support to researchers on a competitive basis in private and public universities, colleges, research centers, and companies. It also focuses on research collaboration between UAE researchers and international partners.

== History ==
The National Research Foundation (NRF) was established in March 2008 by a decree signed by Sheikh Nahyan bin Mubarak Al Nahyan, the then Minister of Higher Education & Scientific Research. In its early years, the NRF favored research projects that survived international peer review or contributed social, economic, and developmental benefits to the UAE.

=== UAE Government Strategy 2011-2013 ===
After the UAE government launched the UAE Government Strategy 2011-2013 by Sheikh Mohammed bin Rashid Al Maktoum, which consists of seven principles, priorities and, enablers, it lays the foundation to achieve "UAE Vision 2021", which is a long-term plan by the UAE to make it "the best countries in the world by the year 2021 when the UAE would celebrate the Golden Jubilee of its formation as a federation." Amongst the seven priorities identified in the strategy document is "Competitive Knowledge Economy".
