= National Natural Science Foundation of China =

Chinese government body

- 中华人民共和国国家自然科学基金委员会; Zhōnghuá Rénmín Gònghéguó Guójiā Zìrán Kēxué Jījīn Wěiyuánhuì

Agency overview
- Formed: 1986; 40 years ago
- Jurisdiction: Ministry of Science and Technology

The National Natural Science Foundation of China (NSFC; 国家自然科学基金委员会) is a vice-ministerial institution under the Ministry of Science and Technology. It administers the National Natural Science Fund.

== History ==
NSFC was created on February 14, 1986 under the State Council of China to administer the National Natural Science Fund.

In 2018, NSFC became a vice-ministerial-level institution of the Ministry of Science and Technology (MOST).

In 2023, MOST's China Agenda 21 Management Center and High Technology Research and Development Center were subordinated to the NSFC.

== Functions ==
The NSFC approves and funds basic research projects, helps MOST develop policies for basic and some applied research, and is an interface for foreign cooperation. It is the main source of basic research funding in China.

== See also ==
- Cost per paper
