= List of power stations in the Czech Republic =

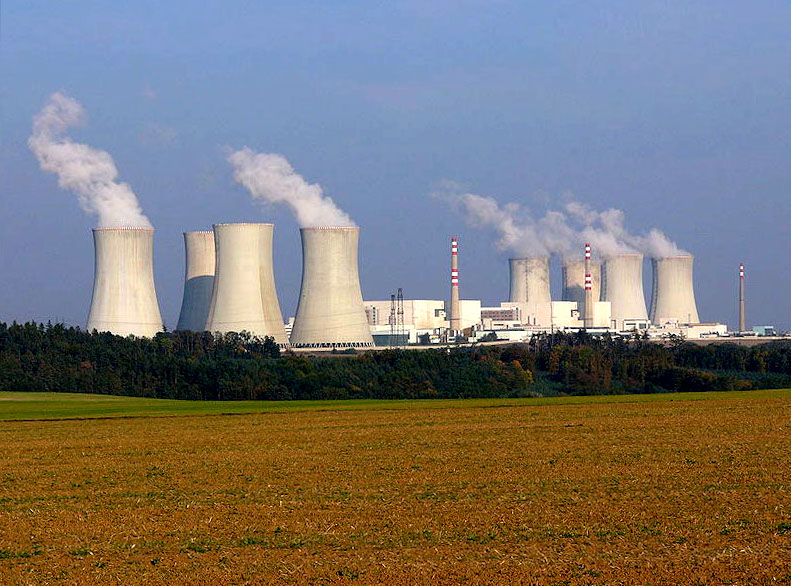
Dukovany Nuclear Power Station

The following page lists major power stations in the Czech Republic. As of 31 December 2009, power stations in the Czech Republic had an installed electrical generating capacity of 18,326 MWe; of these, 3,830 MWe were in nuclear plants, 11,655 MWe in other thermal plants, 2,183 MWe in hydro plants, 193 MWe in wind power plants and 465 MWe in solar plants. Because of generous feed-in tariff, solar plants boomed in 2010, reaching 1,394 MWe as of December 1, 2010.

== Nuclear ==
Name	Location	Coordinates	Type	Capacity, MWe	Operational	Notes
Dukovany NPP	Dukovany	49.0863325°N 16.1454391°E	VVER	471	1985-	upgraded from 440 MWe in 2007
		49.0858688°N 16.1467052°E	VVER	471	1986-	
		49.0851521°N 16.1491513°E	VVER	471	1987-	upgraded from 440 MWe in 2005
		49.0847445°N 16.1504388°E	VVER	471	1987-	upgraded from 440 MWe in 2007
Temelín NPP	Temelín	49.1802797°N 14.3752992°E	VVER	1,068	2002-	
		49.1795363°N 14.3772733°E	VVER	1,068	2003-	

== Thermal ==
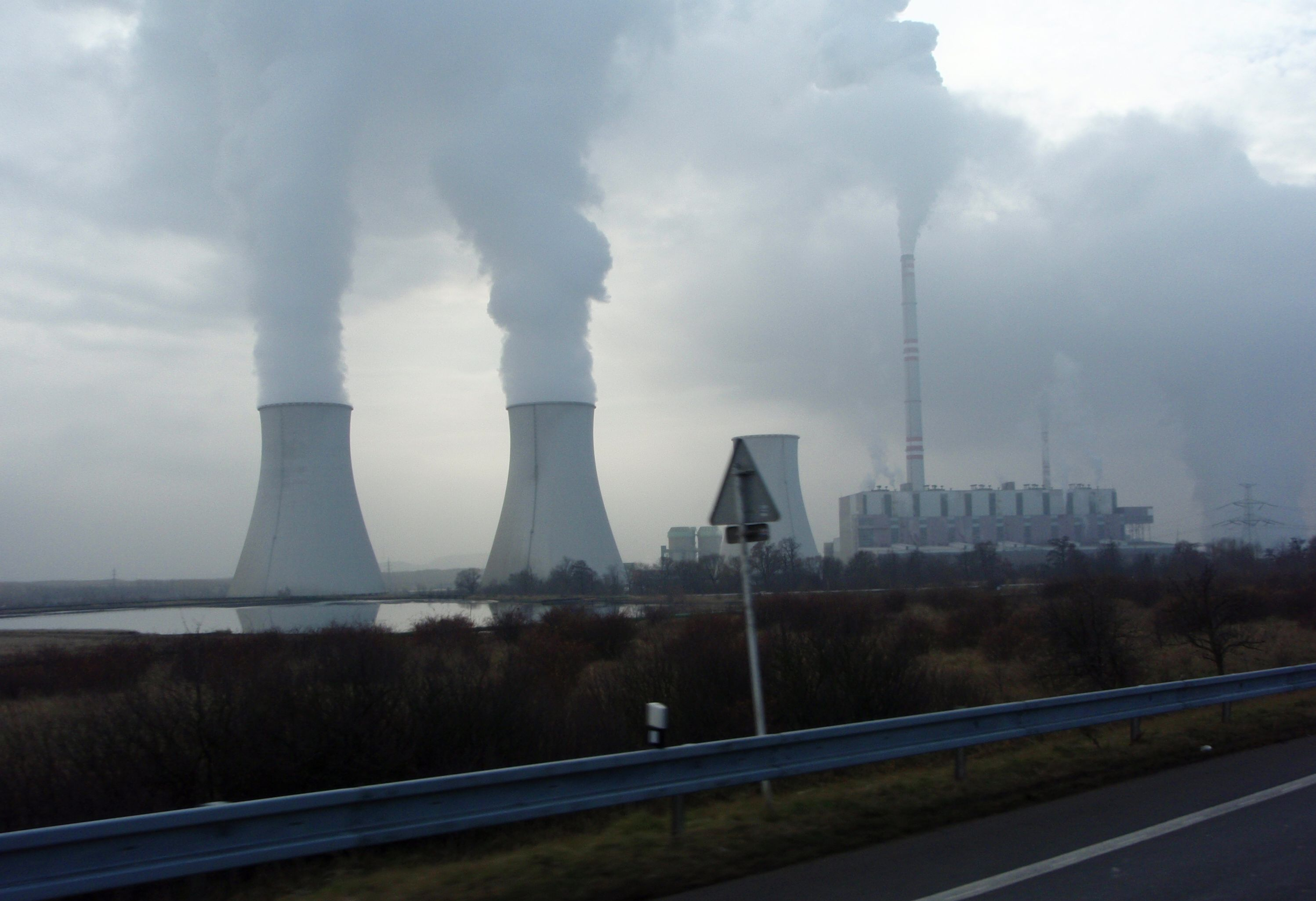
Prunéřov Power Station II

This is a list of power stations with a capacity greater than 100 MW.

Name	Location	Coordinates	Capacity, MWe	Units	Gross power generation 2008 (GWh)	Fuel	Operator
Prunéřov Power Station II	Prunéřov	50.414°N 13.259°E	1,050	5	6430	Lignite	ČEZ, a. s.
Počerady Power Station	Počerady	50.4267567°N 13.6788154°E	1,000	5	6457	Lignite	ČEZ, a. s.
Počerady Power Station 2	Počerady	50.42909°N 13.67537°E	845	3	-	natural gas	ČEZ, a. s.
Chvaletice Power Station	Chvaletice	50.027483°N 15.4533139°E	800	4	3099	Lignite	Elektrárna Chvaletice a.s.
Dětmarovice Power Station	Dětmarovice	49.9058435°N 18.4681463°E	800	4	2253	black coal	Elektrárna Dětmarovice, a.s.
Tušimice Power Station II	Tušimice	50.3824728°N 13.3402133°E	800	4	2612	Lignite	ČEZ, a. s.
Mělník Power Station III	Horní Počaply	50.4119089°N 14.4187832°E	500	1	2830	Lignite	ČEZ, a. s.
Prunéřov Power Station I	Prunéřov	50.4117995°N 13.2527733°E	440	4	2610	Lignite	ČEZ, a. s.
Vřesová Power Station	Vřesová		370	2	2110	syngas generated from lignite, natural gas	Sokolovská uhelná, právní nástupce, a. s.
Opatovice Power Station	Opatovice	50.1264868°N 15.7932866°E	363	6	2241	Lignite	Elektrárny Opatovice, a.s.
Mělník Power Station I	Horní Počaply	50.4148214°N 14.413408°E	352	6	1487	Lignite	ENERGOTRANS a.s.
Kladno - Dubská Power Station	Kladno	50.153184°N 14.1289812°E	305	4	1542	Lignite, black coal, fuel oil, biomass	Alpiq Generation (CZ) s.r.o.
Ostrava - Kunčice Power Station	Ostrava		254	11	1357	black coal, coke owen gas, blast-furnace gas	TAMEH Czech s.r.o.
Komořany Power Station	Komořany		239	8	806	Lignite (CFB)	United Energy právní nástupce, a.s.
Mělník Power Station II	Horní Počaply	50.4130301°N 14.4168305°E	220	2	1159	Lignite	ČEZ, a. s.
Ledvice Power Station 2	Ledvice	50.5766061°N 13.7793794°E	220	2	1510	Lignite	ČEZ, a. s.
Vřesová Heating Station	Vřesová	50.2558213°N 12.6959896°E	220	4	1643	Lignite	Sokolovská uhelná, právní nástupce, a. s.
Tisová Power Station I	Březová		184	4		Lignite, biomass	ČEZ, a. s.
Třebovice Power Station	Ostrava		174	2		black coal, fuel oil	Veolia Energie ČR, a.s.
Poříčí Power Station	Trutnov		165	3		Lignite, biomass, black coal	ČEZ, a. s.
Plzeň	Plzeň		149	3		Lignite, natural gas, biomass	Plzeňská teplárenská, a.s.
Malešice Heating Station	Prague		122	4		black coal	Pražská teplárenská a.s.
Štětí	Štětí		113	5	1984 - 2008	Lignite, fuel oil, biomass	Mondi Štětí, a.s.
Litvínov T700	Litvínov		112	5		Lignite	UNIPETROL RPA, s.r.o.
Tisová Power Station II	Březová		112	1		Lignite	ČEZ, a. s.
Ledvice Power Station 3	Ledvice		110	1		Lignite	ČEZ, a. s.
Hodonín Power Station	Hodonín		105	2		Lignite, biomass	ČEZ, a. s.

== Hydroelectric ==
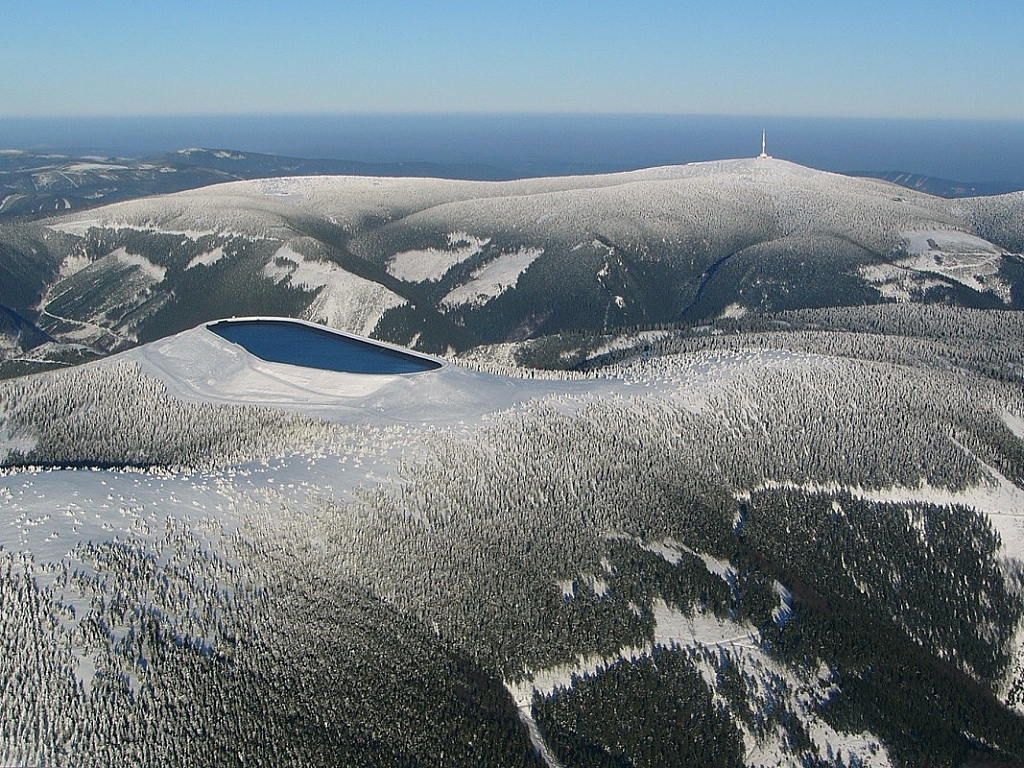
Dlouhé Stráně Hydro Power Plant

This is a list of power stations with a capacity greater than 15 MW.

Name	Location	Coordinates	Capacity, MWe	Gross power generation 2008 (GWh)	type	Operator
Dlouhé Stráně Hydro Power Plant	Loučná nad Desnou	50.084298°N 17.1810293°E	650	152	pumped-storage	ČEZ
Dalešice Hydro Power Plant	Kramolín	49.1242473°N 16.1243677°E	450	170	pumped-storage	ČEZ
Orlík Hydro Power Plant	Solenice	49.6068444°N 14.1812253°E	364	300	conventional	ČEZ
Slapy Hydro Power Plant	Štěchovice	49.8235461°N 14.4345009°E	144	248	conventional	ČEZ
Lipno Hydro Power Plant	Lipno nad Vltavou	48.6329937°N 14.2399335°E	120	148	conventional	ČEZ
Štěchovice Pumped Storage Power Station	Štěchovice		45		pumped-storage	ČEZ
Kamýk Hydro Power Plant	Kamýk nad Vltavou		40		conventional	ČEZ
Štěchovice Hydro Power Plant	Štěchovice		22.5		conventional	ČEZ
Střekov Hydro Power Plant	Ústí nad Labem		19.5		run-of-the-river	ČEZ
Vranov Hydro Power Plant	Vranov nad Dyjí		18.9		conventional	E.ON Trend

== Solar and wind ==
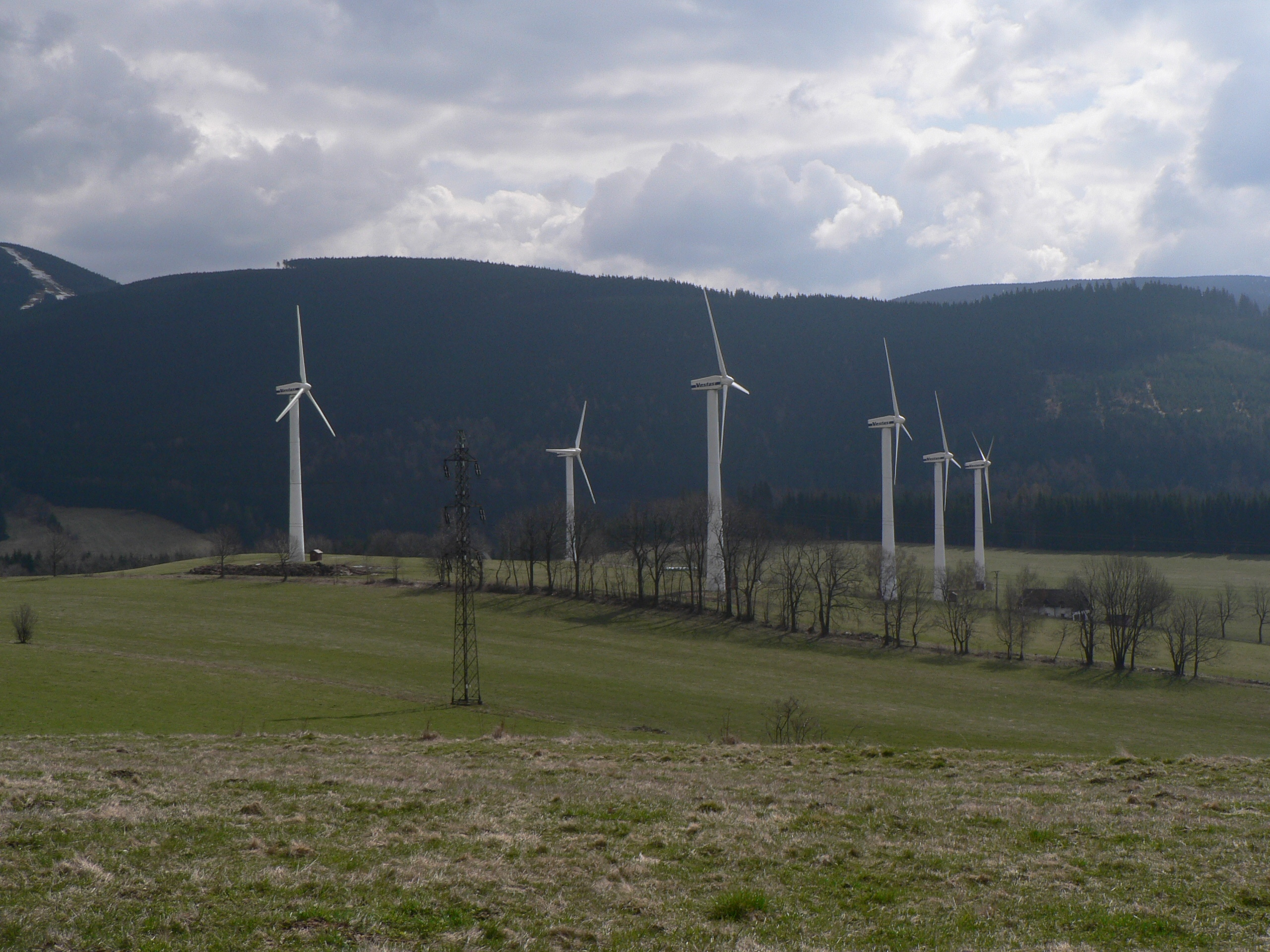
Ostružná Wind Park

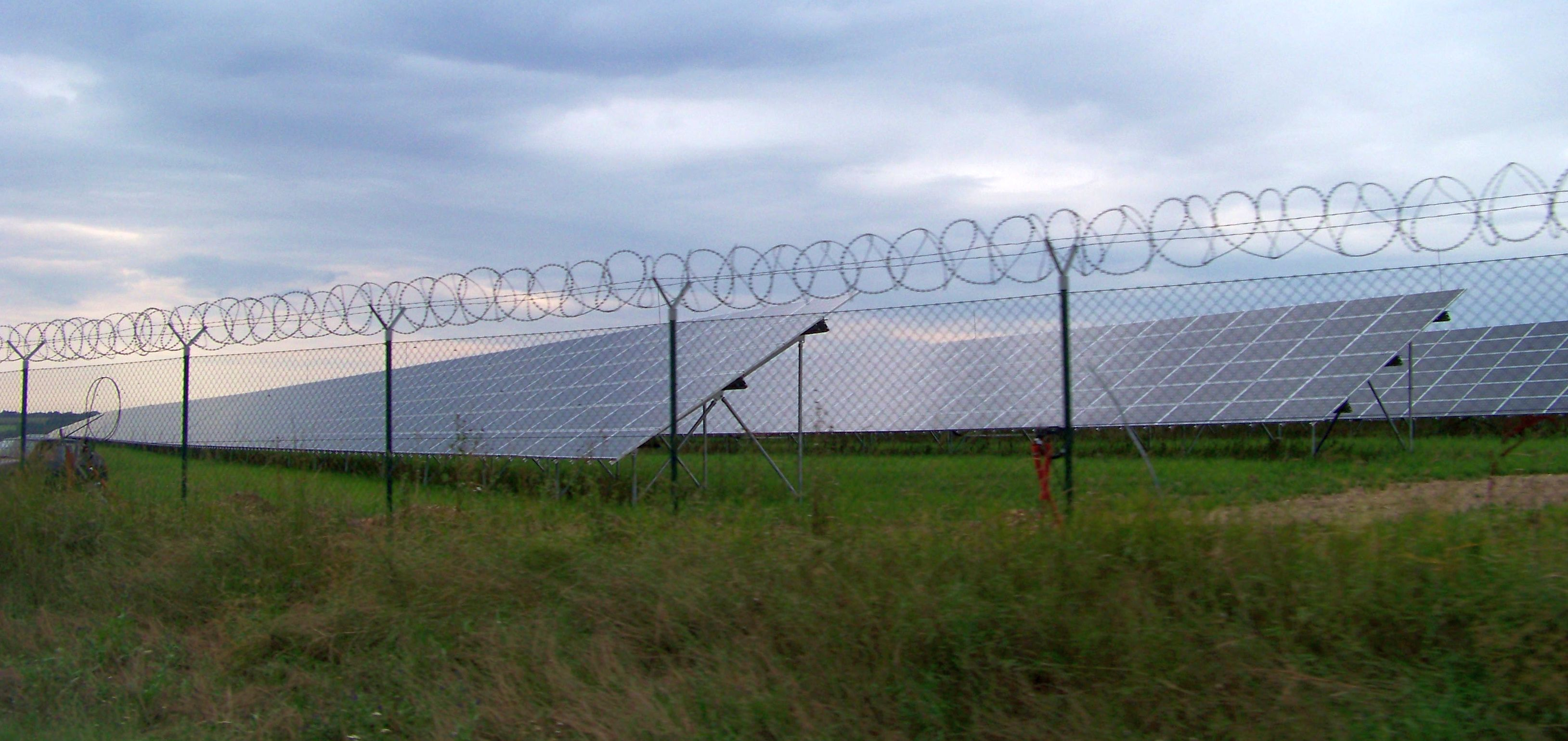
Vepřek Solar Park

Name	Capacity, MWe	Type	Owner
Kryštofovy Hamry Wind Park	42	wind	ecoenerg Windkraft
Ralsko Solar Park Ra 1	38	photovoltaic	ČEZ
Vepřek Solar Park	35	photovoltaic	FVE CZECH NOVUM
Ševětín Solar Park	30	photovoltaic	ČEZ
Horní Loděnice Wind Park	18	wind	Větrná energie HL
Mimoň Solar Park Ra 3	17	photovoltaic	ČEZ
Vranovská Ves Solar Park	16	photovoltaic	ČEZ
Solar Stříbro	14	photovoltaic	Solar Stříbro
ŽV - SUN Solar Park	13	photovoltaic	Z-Grop
Uherský Brod Solar Park	10	photovoltaic	Divalia
Sulkov Solar Park	10	photovoltaic	Scatec Solar
Chrudichromy Solar Park	10	photovoltaic	??
many other stations	<10		

== See also ==
- Energy in the Czech Republic
- List of largest power stations in the world
