= Cabinet of Jan Fischer =

Jan Fischer's Cabinet
- 10th Cabinet of Czech Republic
- 8 May 2009 - 13 July 2010
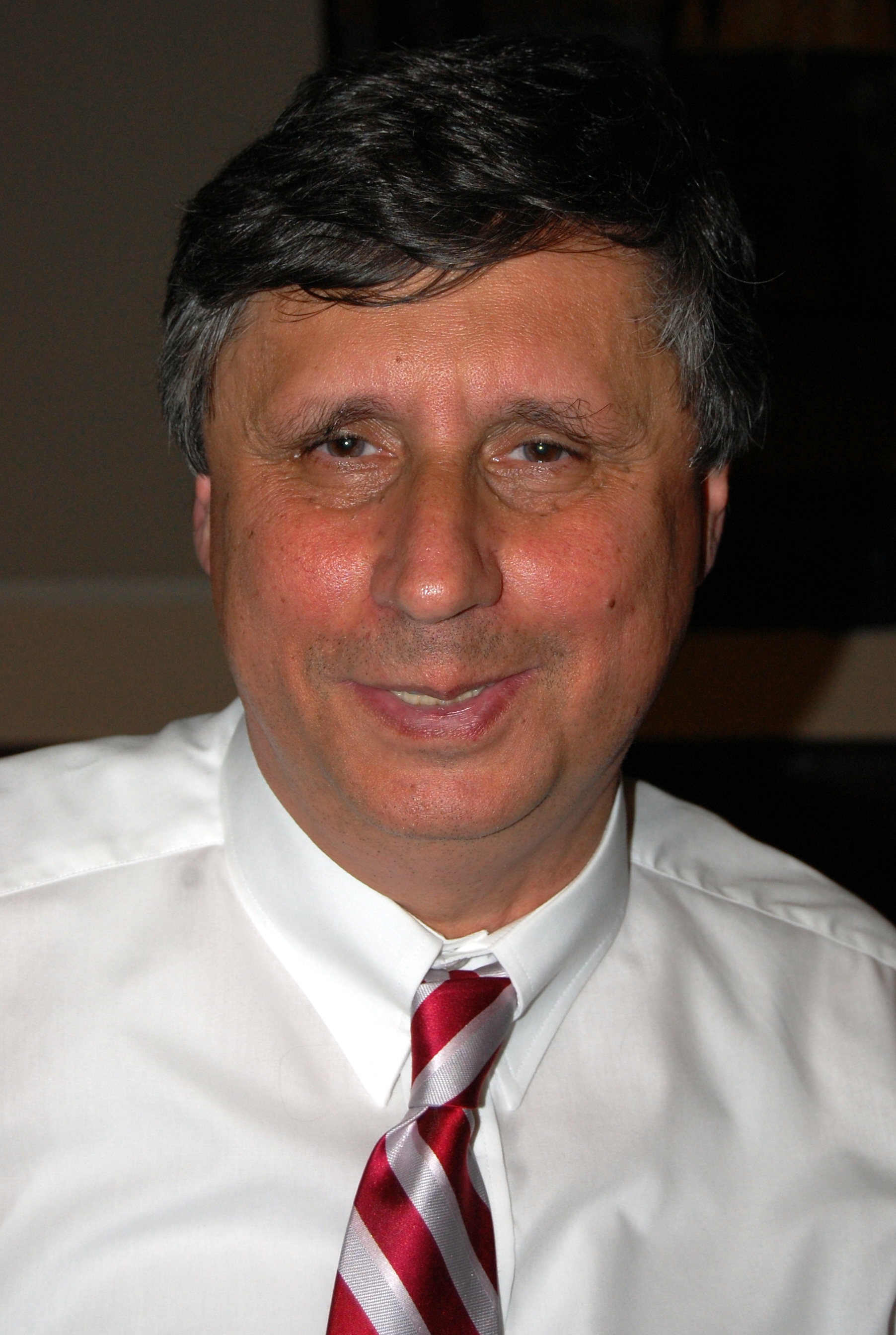
- Date formed: 8 May 2009
- Date dissolved: 13 July 2010

People and organisations
- Head of state: Václav Klaus
- Head of government: Jan Fischer
- No. of ministers: 18
- Member party: ODS; ČSSD; SZ
- Status in legislature: Supermajority caretakers (Coalition)
- Opposition party: KSČM; KDU-ČSL

History
- Outgoing election: 2006 Czech legislative election
- Incoming formation: 2009
- Outgoing formation: 2010
- Predecessor: Topolánek II
- Successor: Nečas

The Government of the Czech Republic, led by Prime Minister Jan Fischer, was a caretaker government established after Mirek Topolánek and his government lost confidence vote in the Chamber of Deputies.

== History ==
Fischer, an independent statistician, was chosen as non-party candidate for the office of Prime Minister. Government ministers were recommended by Civic Democratic Party, Social Democratic Party and Green Party. Christian Democrats firstly supported the idea of establishing a temporary government until the next legislative election takes place. Jiří Čunek, leader of the Christian Democrats, later announced that his party would not nominate any candidate to this government but was willing to support it if they approve the government's programme. Regardless the decision of the presidium of the party, Miroslav Kalousek, Vlasta Parkanová and four other MPs, declared that they support new cabinet. Overally Civic Democrats nominated 6 Ministers and Prime Minister, Social Democrats 8 Ministers and Greens 2 Ministers.

Jan Fischer was named Prime Minister on 9 April 2009. The rest of his cabinet was named on 8 May 2009. According to the Constitution of the Czech Republic, Fischer and his cabinet have to survive confidence vote in the Chamber of Deputies in 30 days.

== Government ministers ==
Portfolio	Minister	Nominated by
Prime Minister	Jan Fischer	ODS
Deputy Prime Minister; Minister of Foreign Affairs	Jan Kohout	ČSSD
Deputy Prime Minister; Minister of Defence	Martin Barták	ODS
Minister for the European Affairs	Štefan Füle	ČSSD
Minister for the European Affairs	Juraj Chmiel	ODS
Minister of Labour and Social Affairs	Petr Šimerka	ČSSD
Minister of Environment	Ladislav Miko	SZ
Minister of Environment	Jan Dusík	SZ
Minister of Environment	Jakub Šebesta	ČSSD
Minister of Environment	Rut Bízková	ODS
Minister for Regional Development	Rostislav Vondruška	ČSSD
Minister of Interior	Martin Pecina	ČSSD
Minister of Industry and Trade	Vladimír Tošovský	ČSSD
Minister of Health	Dana Jurásková	ODS
Minister of Finance	Eduard Janota	ODS
Minister of Justice	Daniela Kovářová	ODS
Minister of Transport	Gustáv Slamečka	ODS
Minister of Education, Youth and Sport	Miroslava Kopicová	ODS
Minister of Culture	Václav Riedlbauch	ODS
Minister of Agriculture	Jakub Šebesta	ČSSD
Minister for Human Rights and Minorities	Michael Kocáb	SZ
Chairman of the Legislative Council	Pavel Zářecký	ČSSD
