= ČT edu =

ČT edu is a web portal of the Czech Television, which offers teachers, pupils and parents thousands of short videos to supplement teaching. Videos cover topics from pre-school, primary and secondary education and are divided according to grades, but also according to subjects and the specific subject they cover. The structure of the portal is thus based on framework educational programs.

The portal also provides teaching ideas on a variety of seasonal, current and timeless topics for teachers. These ideas combine audio-visual demonstrations with worksheets and other extension materials.

== History ==
Czech Television launched the project on 1 April 2020. Its founder is Alžběta Plívová. Czech Television responded this to the state of emergency declared on the territory of the Czech Republic on March 12, 2020, in connection with the COVID-19 pandemic and closure of Czech schools. Along with educational programs UčíTelka and Škola doma, responded in another way to the state of emergency declared on the territory of the Czech Republic on 12 March 2020 as a result of COVID-19 pandemic, The website, which was originally planned to launch in 2021 and was supposed to become a digital aid for face-to-face teaching, quickly became a tool intensively used for distance education. From the beginning, the portal was freely available to all users.

== Content ==
Videos for ČT edu are selected from already existing programs of Czech Television by experienced teaching staff and teachers with approval for the given subject from various schools and regions. Worksheets for teaching topics are created specifically for the purposes of ČT edu in cooperation with pedagogues, or other experts (for example, Samet na školách, Post Bellum, Institute for the Study of Totalitarian Regimes). The footage of mainly monothematic videos is chosen with regard to the possibilities of the school lesson and with regard to their primary function, i.e. to provide a complement to other teaching methods. For each video, ČT edu also offers the option to play the entire program in the original, unabridged version.

Videos are most often used by teachers as an illustrative aid, to enliven the teaching and as material for assigning the pupil's homework. Audio-visually presented information arouses interest and emotions in students and, in conjunction with other sources, supports memorization or understanding of the material discussed.

Teachers can legally use videos in their teaching without infringing copyright.

== Awards ==
The content of ČT edu was praised by expert jury of the 60th edition of the international Zlín Film Festival as an extraordinary achievement that contributed to mitigating the effects of the crisis on children's education, including the popularization of science. The jury awarded on 4 September 2020 ČT edu together and Technology Agency of the Czech Republic a special film award "For popularizing science among youth". Czech Television won the TOP responsible company of the year award for educational projects during the COVID-19 pandemic.
