= Jan Dusík =

Czech activist and politician

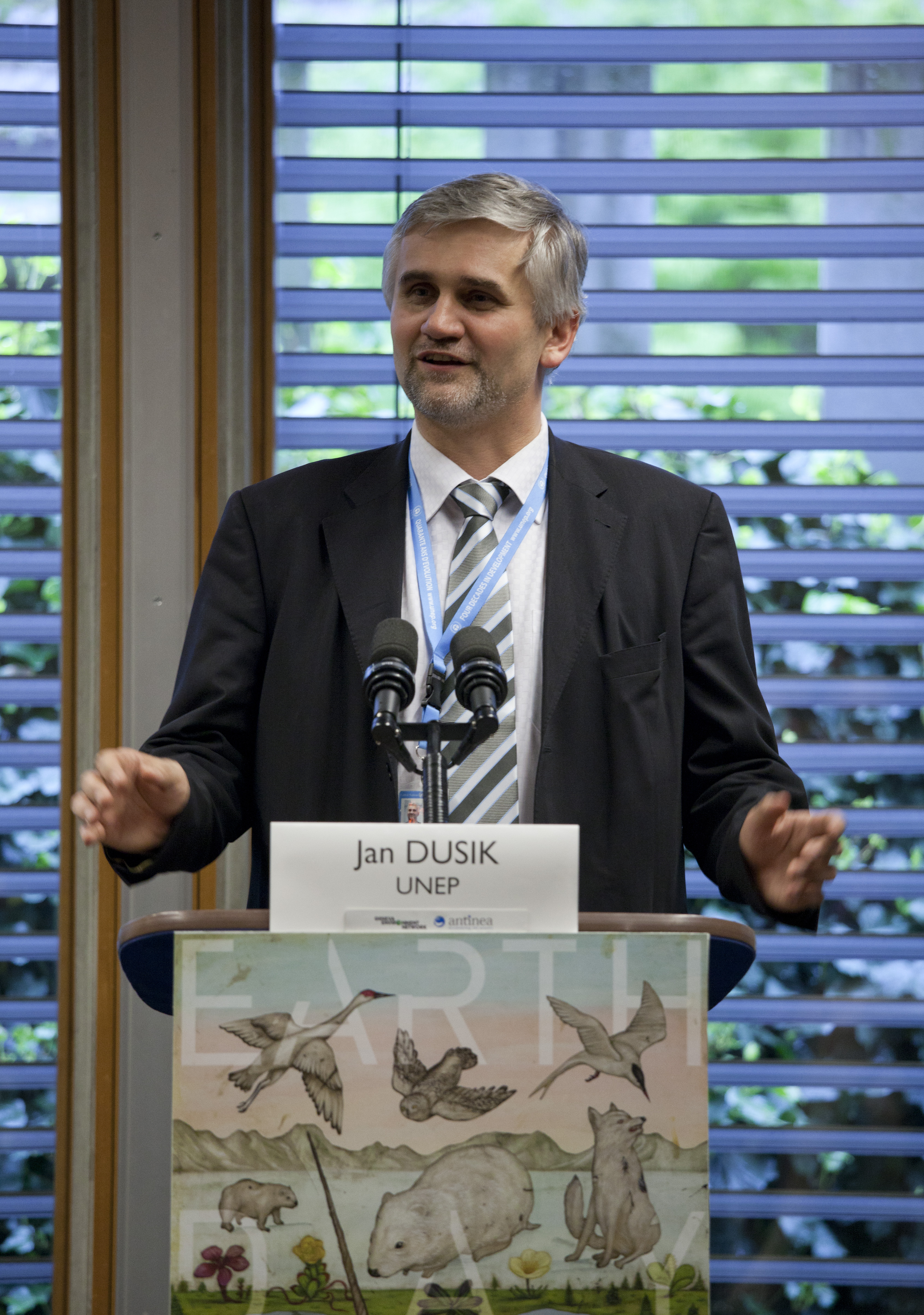

Minister of Environment
- In office 30 November 2009 – 19 March 2010
- Prime Minister: Jan Fischer
- Preceded by: Ladislav Miko
- Succeeded by: Jakub Šebesta

Personal details
- Born: 25 April 1975 (age 50) Plzeň, Czechoslovakia
- Party: Green Party

Jan Dusík (born 25 April 1975) is a Czech activist and former politician. He was Minister of Environment and senior official in the United Nations Environment Programme in Geneva. Since March 2020 he leads sustainable development agenda in the WWF Arctic Programme.

== Biography ==
Dusík is a graduate of the Law School of the Charles University in Prague and Oxford University where he studied Environmental Change and Management.

== Minister of Environment ==
He has served as the Deputy Minister before being appointed the Minister of Environment in November 2009. This change was done after the former minister Ladislav Miko left to work for the European Commission.

Jan Dusík resigned in March 2010 over plans to modernise the controversial Prunéřov coal-fired power plant in north-west Bohemia. ČEZ’s plans to modernise Prunéřov made international headlines in early 2010 when the Pacific island nation of Micronesia wrote to the Czech Environment Ministry, in the framework of the Espoo Convention, saying that the effect of CO_{2} emissions from Prunéřov and plants like it would eventually see low-lying Pacific islands submerged under the waves due to rising sea levels.

== United Nations career ==
In July 2011 Jan Dusík joined the United Nations Environment Programme - Regional Office for Europe (Geneva, Switzerland), where he served as deputy director and between February 2014 and October 2018 as Director and Regional Representative. Between January 2018 and December 2019 he served as the Principal Adviser to UNEP's Executive Director on Strategic Engagement for the Arctic and Antarctic.
