= Tušimice Power Station =

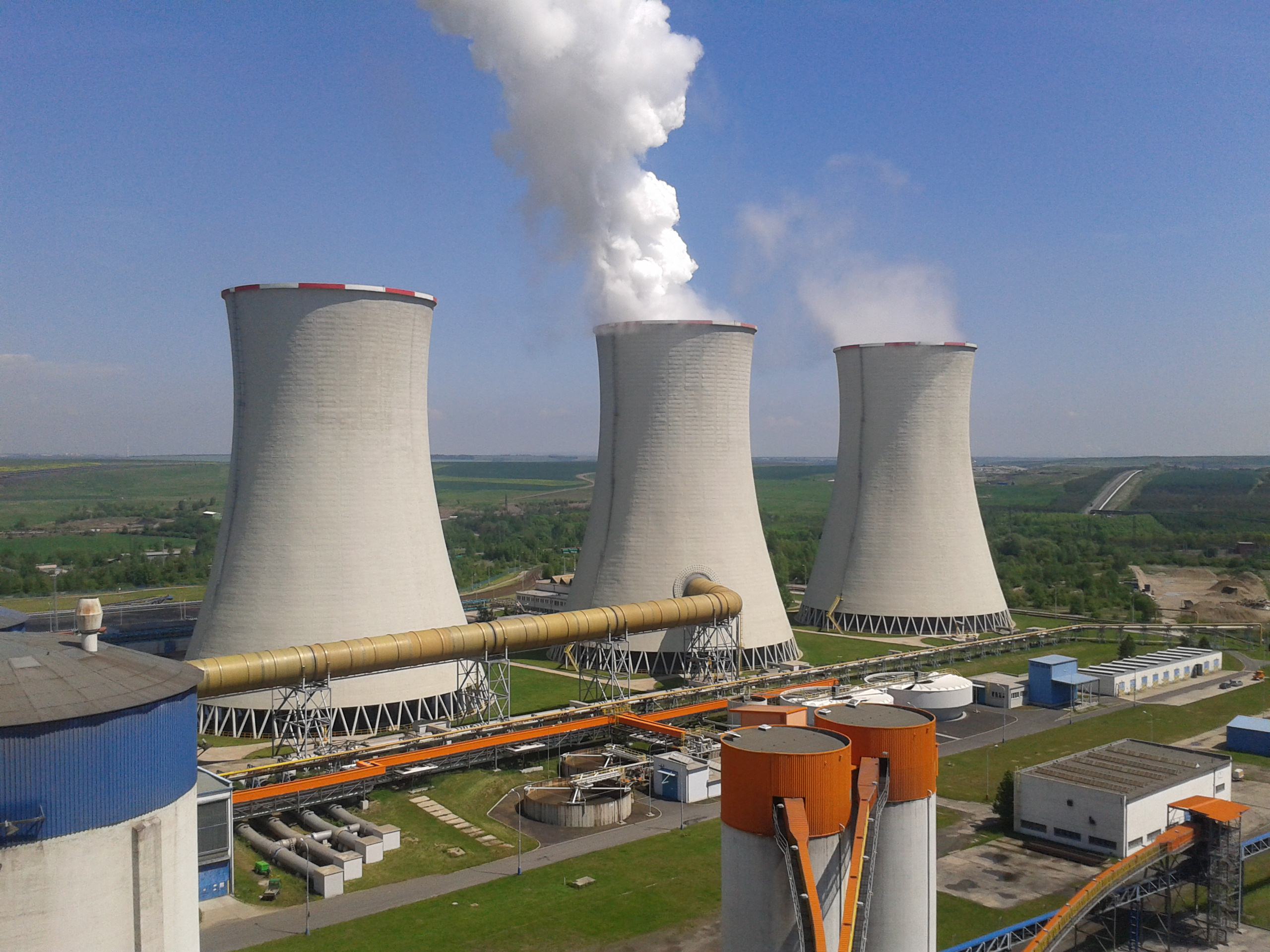
- Chladicí věže elektrárny Tušimice II ze střechy kotelny
- Location of the Tušimice Power Station in the Czech Republic
- Country: Czech Republic
- Location: Kadaň
- Coordinates: 50°22′52″N 13°20′21″E
- Status: Operational
- Commission date: 1974
- Owner: ČEZ Group
- Operator: ČEZ Group

Thermal power station
- Primary fuel: Lignite

Power generation
- Units operational: 4 × 200 MW
- Make and model: Škoda
- Nameplate capacity: 800 MW

External links
- Commons: Related media on Commons

Tušimice Power Station (Czech: Elektrárna Tušimice) is a lignite-fired power station in Tušimice, part of the town Kadaň in the Ústí nad Labem Region of the Czech Republic. It is owned and operated by ČEZ Group.

The first power station in Tušimice (Tušimice I) was commissioned in 1963–1964. The current power station (Tušimice II) was commissioned in 1973–1974. The power station consists of four generation units with a capacity of 200 MW each. Its turbines and generators are produced by Škoda, and steam boilers are produced by Vítkovické železárny. Tušimice II has a 300-metre (980 ft) flue-gas stack built in 1974.

The power station is supplied by lignite from the local Nástup–Tušimice Mines.

== See also ==
- Energy in the Czech Republic
- List of power stations in the Czech Republic
