= Technology Agency of the Czech Republic =

Technology agency of the Czech Republic
- Technologická agentura České republiky
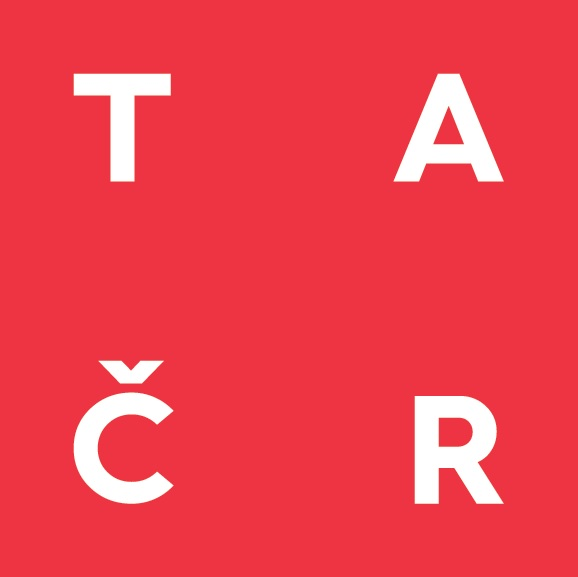

Agency overview
- Formed: 2009
- Type: the support of research, experimental development and innovation
- Headquarters: Evropská 1692/37, 160 00 Prague 6, Czech Republic
- Motto: The research useful for the society.
- Agency executives: Rut Bízková, Ing., Chairwoman; RNDr. Bunček Martin, Ph.D., Deputy Chairman
- Website: http://www.tacr.cz

The Technology Agency of the Czech Republic (TA CR) (Czech: Technologická agentura České republiky) is a Czech government agency, founded in 2009 to enhance and encourage cooperation between research organizations supported by the state and the business sector. Within its programmes, projects of applied research, experimental development and innovations are elected and financed.

== Organizational structure ==
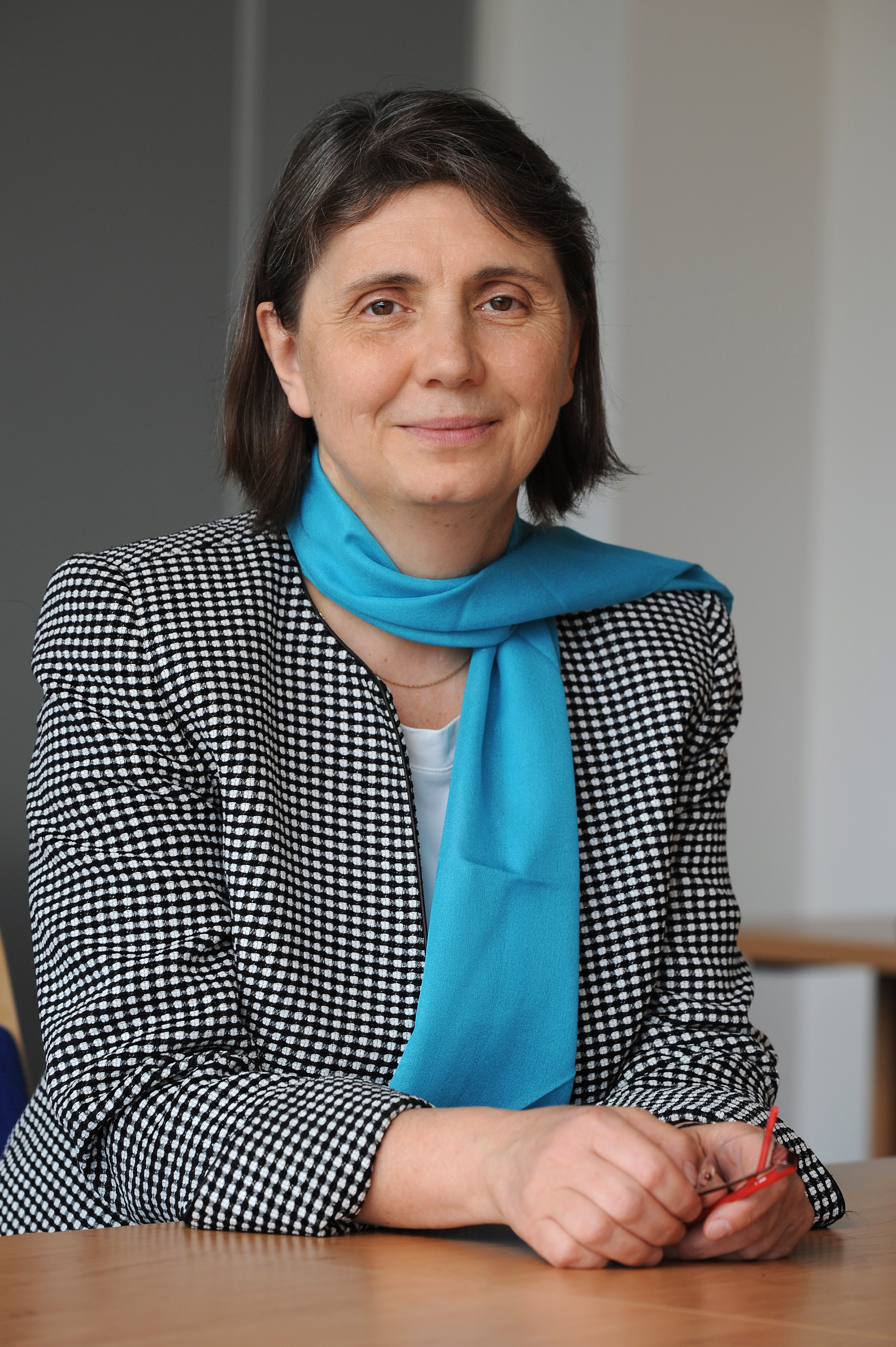
Ing. Rut Bízková - Chairwoman

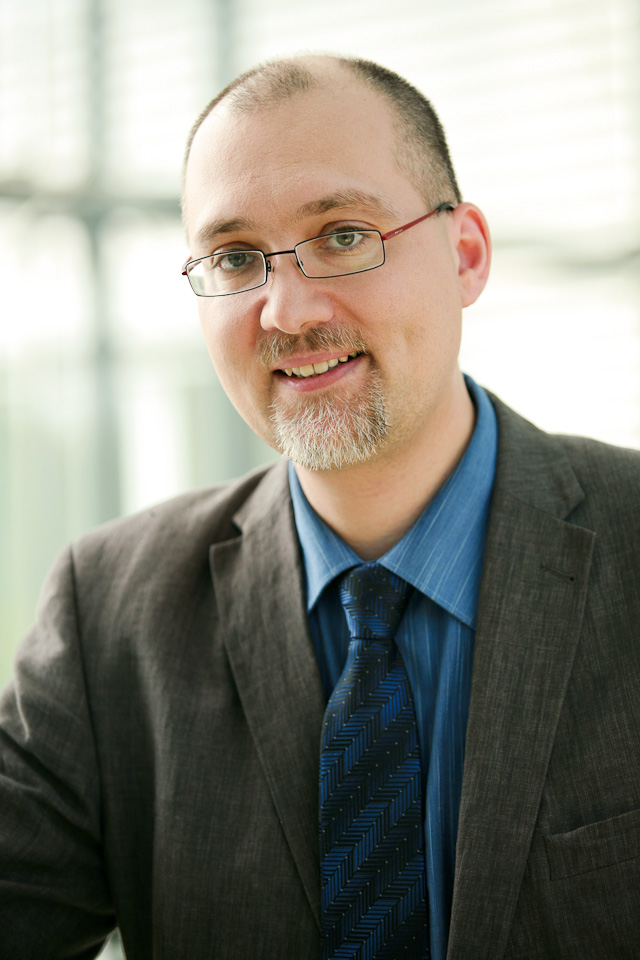
RNDr. Martin Bunček, Ph.D. - Deputy Chairman

=== The Board of TA CR ===
The board of TA CR approves publication of public tenders in research and development and innovation, decides the conclusion of contracts on the support or a decision to grant of the support, then presents a draft statute and its amendments to the government for approval.

The chairwoman of TA CR is Rut Bízková, and other board members are Martin Bunček, Vladimír Kebo, Miroslav Janeček and Pavel Komárek.

=== The Office of TA CR ===
The Office of TA CR is the organizational and administrative part of the agency and is responsible for the preparation of programmes and their documents, as well as the subsequent implementation of these programmes.

=== The Control Council of TA CR ===
The Control Council of TA CR is the agency's supervisory authority, with ten members appointed by the Chamber of Deputies of the Parliament of the Czech Republic, proposed by legal entities engaged in research and development.

Membership of the control board is incompatible with a role in other TA CR authorities. The term of the office is four years, with a maximum of two consecutive terms.

=== The Research Council ===
The Research Council is the conceptual authority of The TA CR. The Research Council has twelve members, appointed and dismissed by the Government on the proposal of the Council for Research, Development and Innovation (R&D&I Council). A term of office is four years. The Chairman of the Research Council and deputy chairman of the council are appointed and removed by the Government on the proposal of the R&D&I Council.

=== The Sectoral Commissions ===
The Sectoral Commissions are advisory authorities which assess and evaluate project proposals that are applying for financial support for research, experimental development and innovation from public funds.

== TA CR Programmes ==
The ALPHA Programme is focused on supporting applied research and experimental development and innovation (R&DI) in the fields of progressive technologies, materials and systems, energy resources and the protection and creation of environment, and sustainable development of transportation.

The BETA Programme is focused on public procurement in R&DI in the field of public administration.

The GAMMA programme aims to verify the results of applied R&DI in terms of their practical application, and to facilitate their subsequent commercial use. The main objective of the programme is to consolidate the R&DI output of research organizations and projects into practical applications so they can be released commercially, and to support their implementation.

The DELTA programme supports applied R&DI cooperation between Czech companies and research organizations and their partners abroad, from countries whose technology or innovation agencies have established cooperation with TA CR. The main aim of the programme is to enable Czech companies and research organizations to work with institutions from non-European countries such as the United States, China, Japan, South Korea, Taiwan and Vietnam.

The EPSILON programme is mainly focused on promoting the Czech Republic internationally by supporting applied R&DI which has a high potential for rapid application of new products, production processes and services, especially R&DI relating to the knowledge-based economy, sustainability of energy and material resources, and environmental quality of life. This is mainly carried out by providing support to projects according to the national priorities of targeted research, experimental development and innovation. The program aims to promote industrial applications especially when using new technologies and new materials in the areas of energy, environment and transport.

The OMEGA programme supports applied R&DI projects which have the potential to develop Czech society. The focus of the programme follows the priorities set by the National Research, Development and Innovation Policy of the Czech Republic for 2009 to 2015, in the context of ongoing European integration and world globalization. The main objective of the programme is to strengthen research activities in the area of applied social sciences and use this research to increase the competitiveness of the Czech Republic, enhance the quality of life of its inhabitants and balance socio-economic development.

The competence centre programme is designed to support the establishment and operation of RD&I centres in advanced fields with high application and innovative potential which could make a substantial contribution to the growth of competitiveness of the Czech Republic. This programme supports the creation and operation of RD&I centres that are innovative, competitive, sustainable, have a market potential and centralize the research and application capacities of the public and private sectors.

== International collaboration ==
According to its statute, one of TA CR's main activities is the development of international collaboration in applied RD&I and collaboration with similar agencies abroad, including:

- Suzhou Industrial Park Administrative Committee, China
- Tongxiang International Chamber of Commerce, China
- Deyang-Guanghan High-tech Industrial Zone, China
- Slovak Innovation and Energy Agency, Slovakia
- State Agency for Technology Innovation, Vietnam
- Taiwan Ministry of Science and Technology (formerly National Science Council)
- New and Renewable Energy Center of Korea Energy Management Corporation, South Korea
- (South Korea) Korea Institute of Industrial Technology
- National Centre for Research and Development in Poland
- National Agency for Science and Engineering Infrastructure, Nigeria
