= Prunéřov Power Station =

Coal-fired power station in the Czech Republic

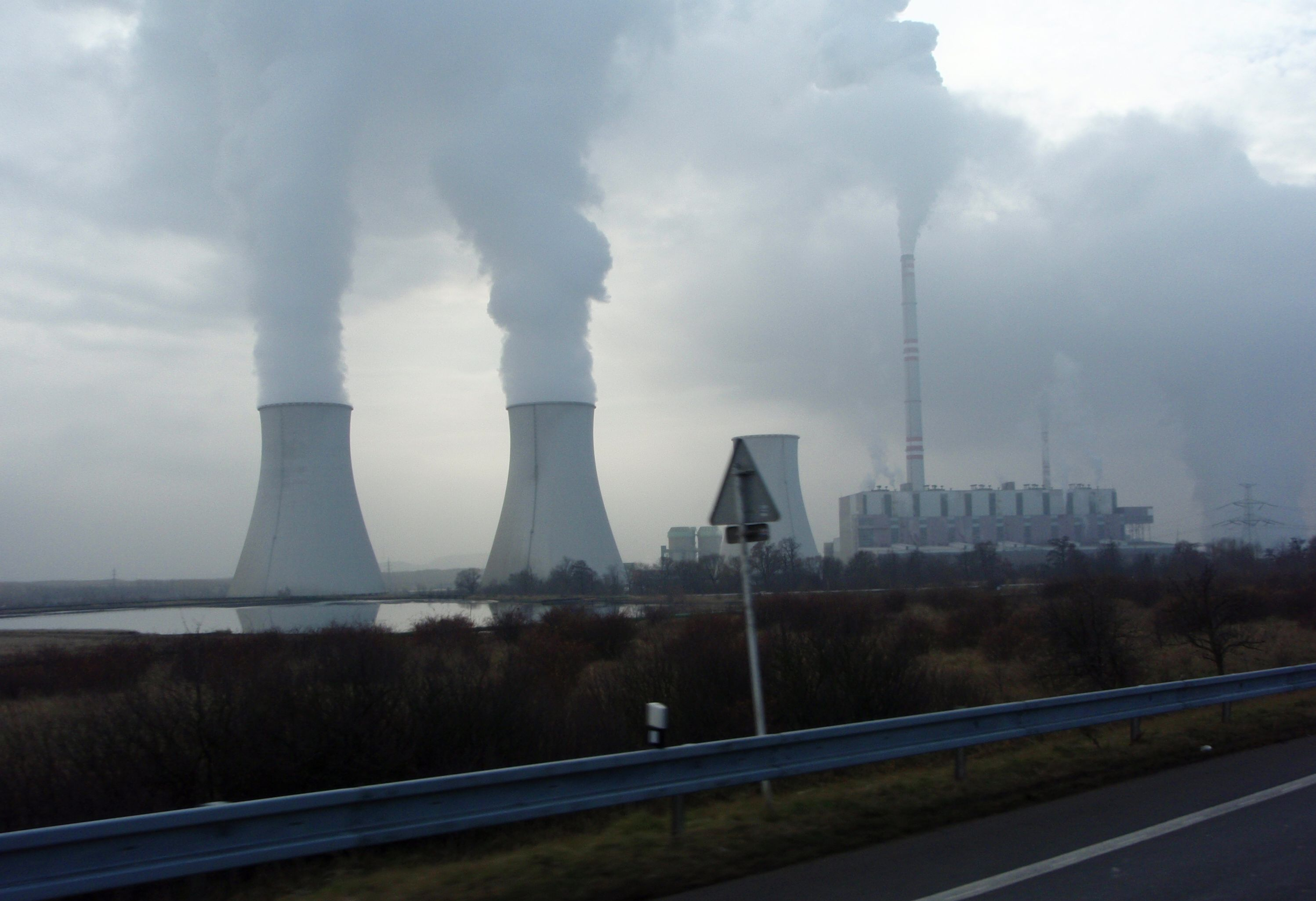
- EPRU II
- Official name: Elektrárna Prunéřov
- Country: Czech Republic
- Location: Kadaň
- Coordinates: 50.418°N 13.259°E
- Status: Operational
- Commission date: 1967-1968 (EPRU I), 1981-1982 (EPRU II)
- Decommission date: 2020 (EPRU I)
- Owner: CEZ Group
- Operator: ČEZ Group

Thermal power station
- Primary fuel: Lignite
- Cogeneration?: Yes

Power generation
- Units operational: 3 × 250 MW (EPRU II)
- Nameplate capacity: 750 MW

External links
- Website: www.cez.cz/en/power-plants-and-environment/coal-fired-power-plants/cr/prunerov.html
- Commons: Related media on Commons

The Prunéřov Power Station (Czech: Elektrárna Prunéřov, EPRU) was the largest coal-fired power station in the Czech Republic with an installed capacity of 1,490 MW. Unit I (EPRU I, 4 x 110 MW) was shut down in June 2020, while recently modernized Unit II (EPRU II, 3 x 250 MW) continues to operate. Besides the electricity, it also supplies heat to the towns of Chomutov, Jirkov, and Klášterec nad Ohří. The installed capacity for heat generation is 500 MW. The station is located near Kadaň and operated by ČEZ Group.

According to the study Dirty Thirty, issued in May 2007 by the WWF, Prunéřov Power Station was the twelfth-worst power station in Europe in terms of the relation of energy efficiency to carbon dioxide (CO_{2}) emissions. The power station was the largest single source of CO_{2} in Czech Republic. In 2008 it emitted 9,210 millions of metric tons of CO_{2}. Unit 2 (EPRU II) of Prunéřov power station has a 300-metre (980 ft) tall flue gas stack.

CEZ planned to modernize unit 2, a plan which was challenged in 2010 by Micronesia in the framework of the Espoo Convention on the grounds that the expansion of the power station would impact global warming and through this the environment of Micronesia. According to the Czech environment ministry that modernization plan does not include best available technology. On January 26, 2010, Czech minister of the Environment Martin Bursík (Green Party member) informed he was calling in international experts to carry out an environmental impact assessment of plans to modernize the power station. In March he publicly released the report from Det Norske Veritas, that proved lack of best available technology in the CEZ plan EIA. Shortly after this Minister Dusík resigned, claiming he was under pressure from prime minister Jan Fischer to approve CEZ plan EIA. As a result, the Green party also withdrew his second minister from government. After a short time, led by Minister of Agriculture Jakub Šebesta, former CEZ employee Rút Bízková was appointed as Minister of the Environment and after two weeks in office he approved CEZ plan EIA in April.

== See also ==
- Energy in the Czech Republic
- List of least carbon efficient power stations
