= Rut Bízková =

Czech politician, former Minister of Environment

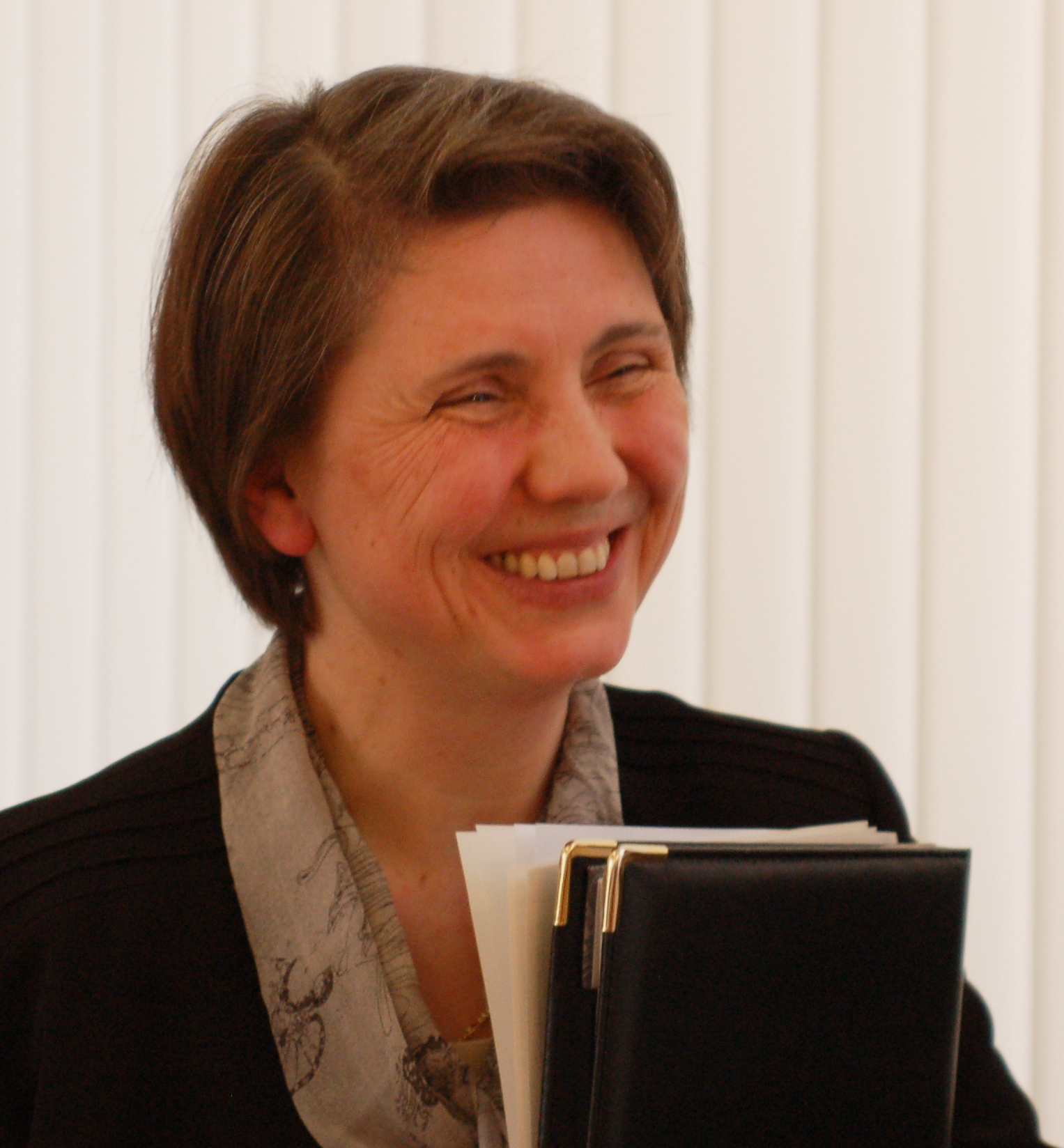

Minister of Environment
- In office 16 April 2010 – 13 July 2010
- Prime Minister: Jan Fischer
- Preceded by: Jakub Šebesta
- Succeeded by: Pavel Drobil

Personal details
- Born: 19 July 1957 (age 68)
- Party: KDS, ODS

Rut Bízková (born 19 July 1957) was the Minister of Environment of the Czech Republic. She was appointed on 16 April 2010, succeeding Jakub Šebesta, who had in turn briefly succeeded Jan Dusík after the latter's resignation in March 2010.

== Career ==
Bízková was educated at Prague's Institute of Chemical Technology, and began her career at the Nuclear Research Institute in Řež. She spent three months in 1993 working for the International Atomic Energy Agency in Vienna, before being appointed press spokeswoman for coal power plants of ČEZ Group, the Czech Republic's major power generation company. Her first government post was as the Environment Ministry's director of public affairs; she held other posts within the ministry til 2004, when she moved to its subsidiary CENIA (the Czech Environmental Information Agency). In 2006 she moved from CENIA's deputy directorship to the post of deputy environment minister in 2006, where she remained until her full ministerial appointment.

=== Career as environment minister ===
==== Prunéřov II ====
Among Bízková's early acts as minister, in late April 2010, was to approve the renovation of the Prunéřov II coal power plant. The 1bn euro works, set to improve the plant's efficiency and extend its operational life by 25 years, were signed off despite an unusual legal protest from the Federated States of Micronesia (FSM). The FSM, a Pacific island nation, objected that coal burning and the associated release of carbon dioxide, a greenhouse gas, contributed to the global warming, and resulting effects that threatened to engulf island states. The international environmental pressure group Greenpeace criticized Bízková's decision, calling attention to her status as a former employee of the plant's operator.

==== Spring 2010 flooding ====
In her capacity as chair of the Czech Central Flood Commission, Bízková led the Czech Republic's response to the May–June 2010 Central European floods. She urged local government officials to take action to build defences against future flooding, earmarking 3.45 billion koruna from government budgets for such works.

== Personal life ==
Bízková is married and has one child.
