= Krumvíř =

- Municipality
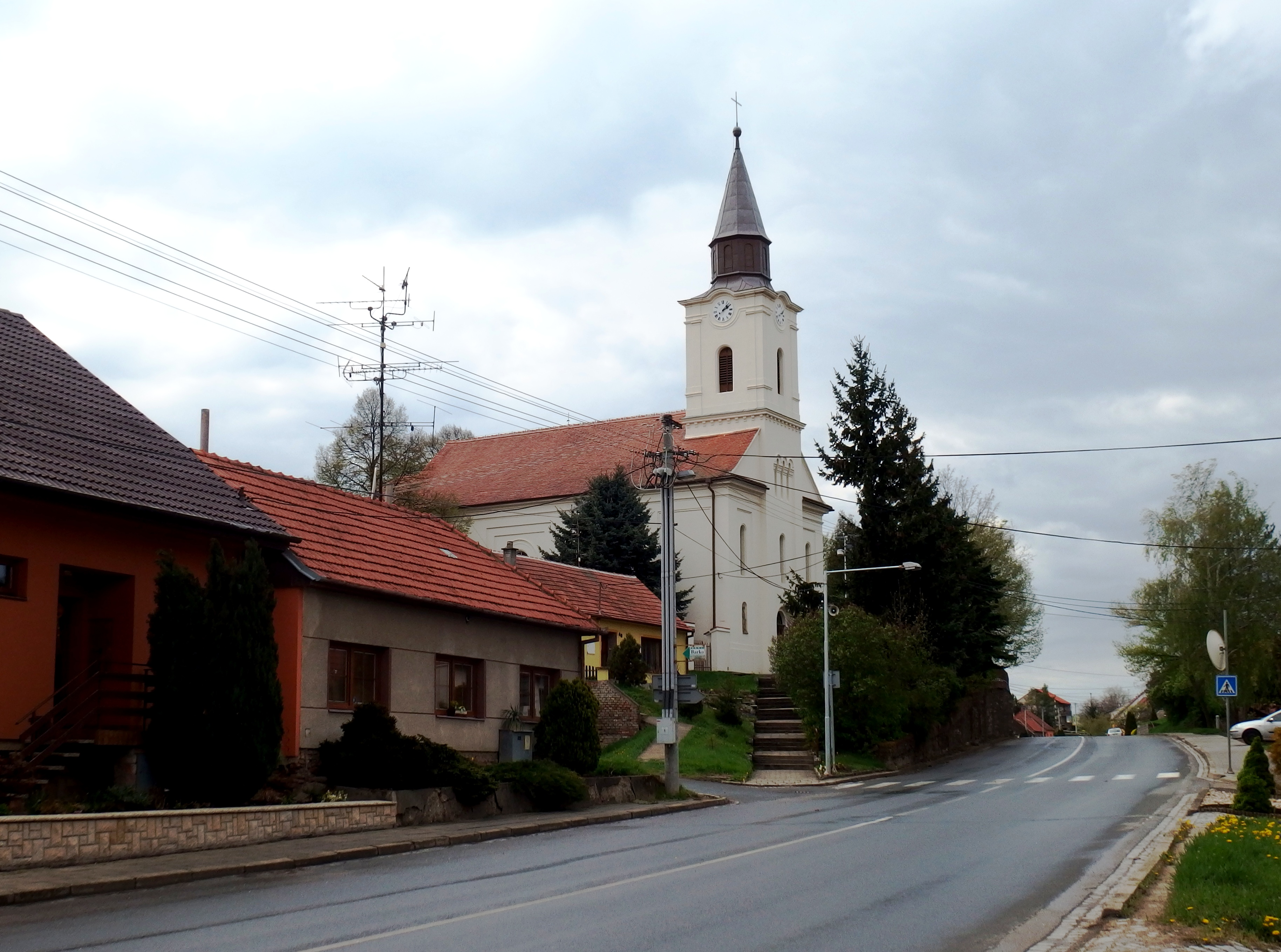
- Church of Saint Bartholomew

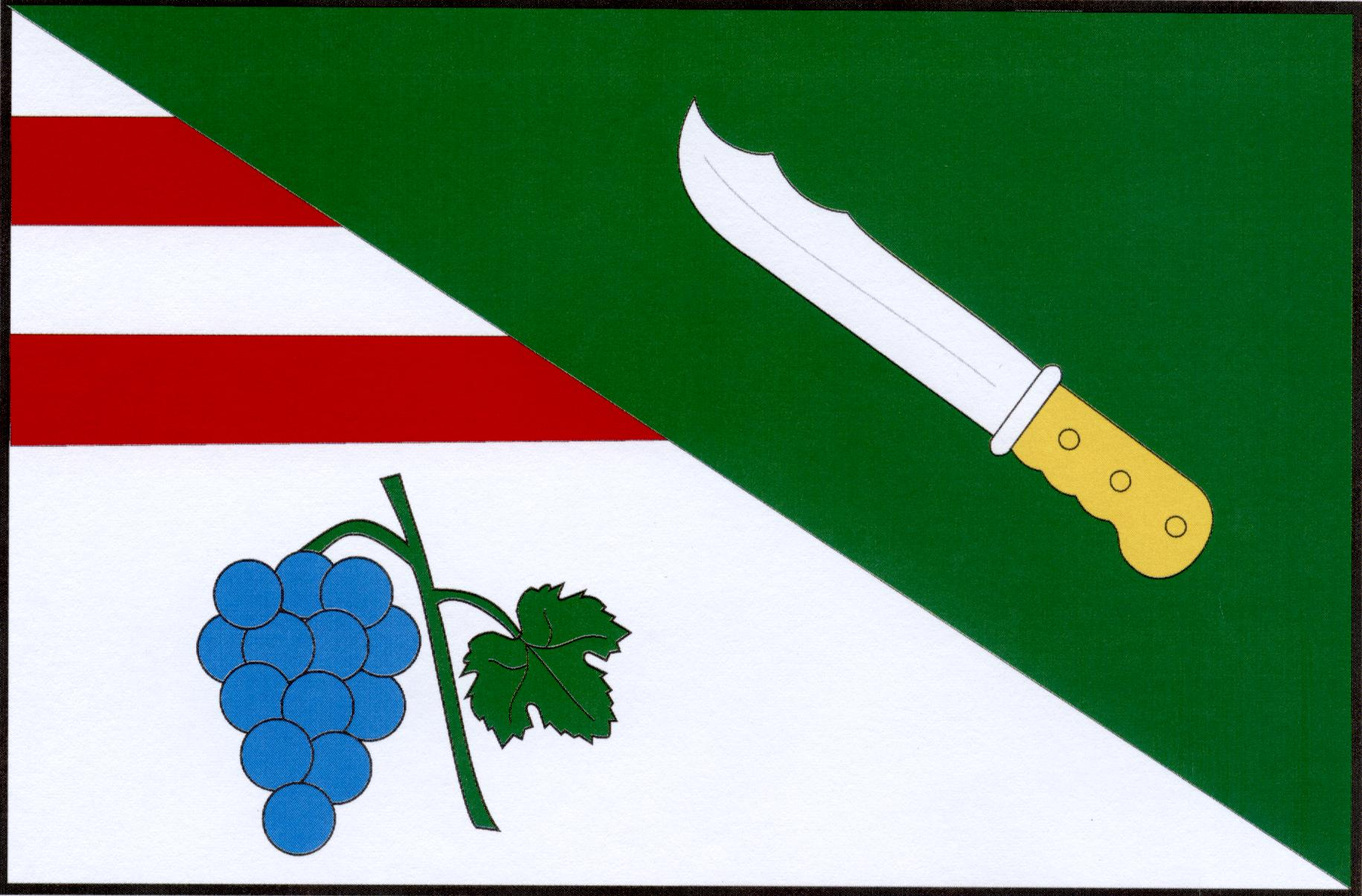
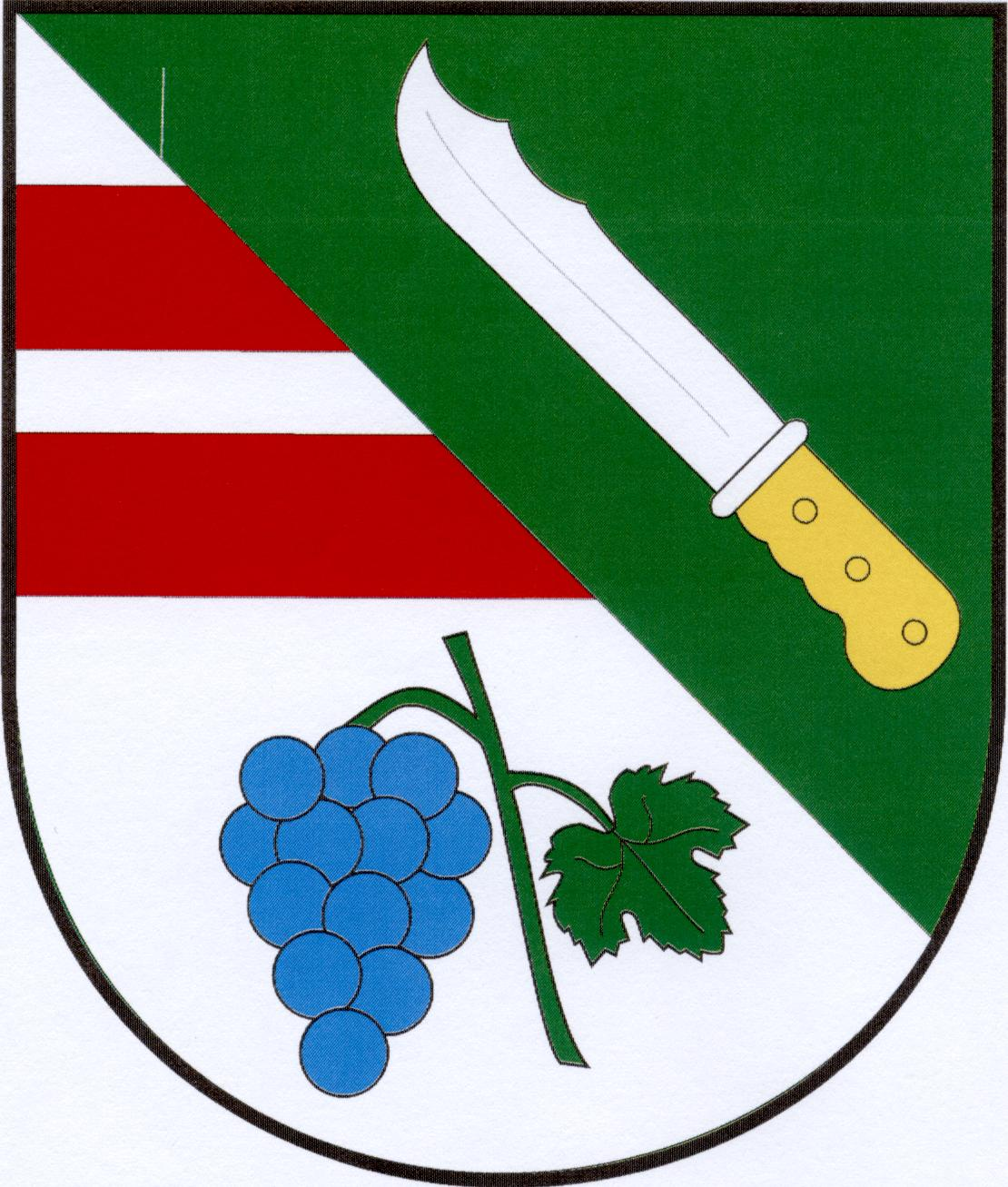
- Flag Coat of arms

- Location in the Czech Republic
- Coordinates: 48°59′20″N 16°54′37″E
- Country: Czech Republic
- Region: South Moravian
- District: Břeclav
- First mentioned: 1350

Area
  - Total: 10.14 km^{2} (3.92 sq mi)
- Elevation: 184 m (604 ft)

Population (2026-01-01)
  - Total: 1,297
  - Density: 127.9/km^{2} (331.3/sq mi)
- Time zone: UTC+1 (CET)
  - Summer (DST): UTC+2 (CEST)
- Postal code: 691 73
- Website: www.krumvir.cz

Krumvíř (German: Grumwirsch) is a municipality and village in Břeclav District in the South Moravian Region of the Czech Republic. It has about 1,300 inhabitants.

== Demographics ==
Historical population
Year	Pop.	±%
1869	873	—
1880	978	+12.0%
1890	968	−1.0%
1900	1,007	+4.0%
1910	1,205	+19.7%
1921	1,290	+7.1%
1930	1,310	+1.6%
1950	1,185	−9.5%
1961	1,308	+10.4%
1970	1,261	−3.6%
1980	1,144	−9.3%
1991	1,089	−4.8%
2001	1,109	+1.8%
2011	1,127	+1.6%
2021	1,231	+9.2%
Source: Censuses

== Economy ==
Krumvíř is known for viticulture. It lies in the Velkopavlovická wine subregion.

== Notable people ==
- Jakub Šebesta (born 1948), politician
- Milan Heča (born 1991), footballer
