= Ševětín =

- Market town
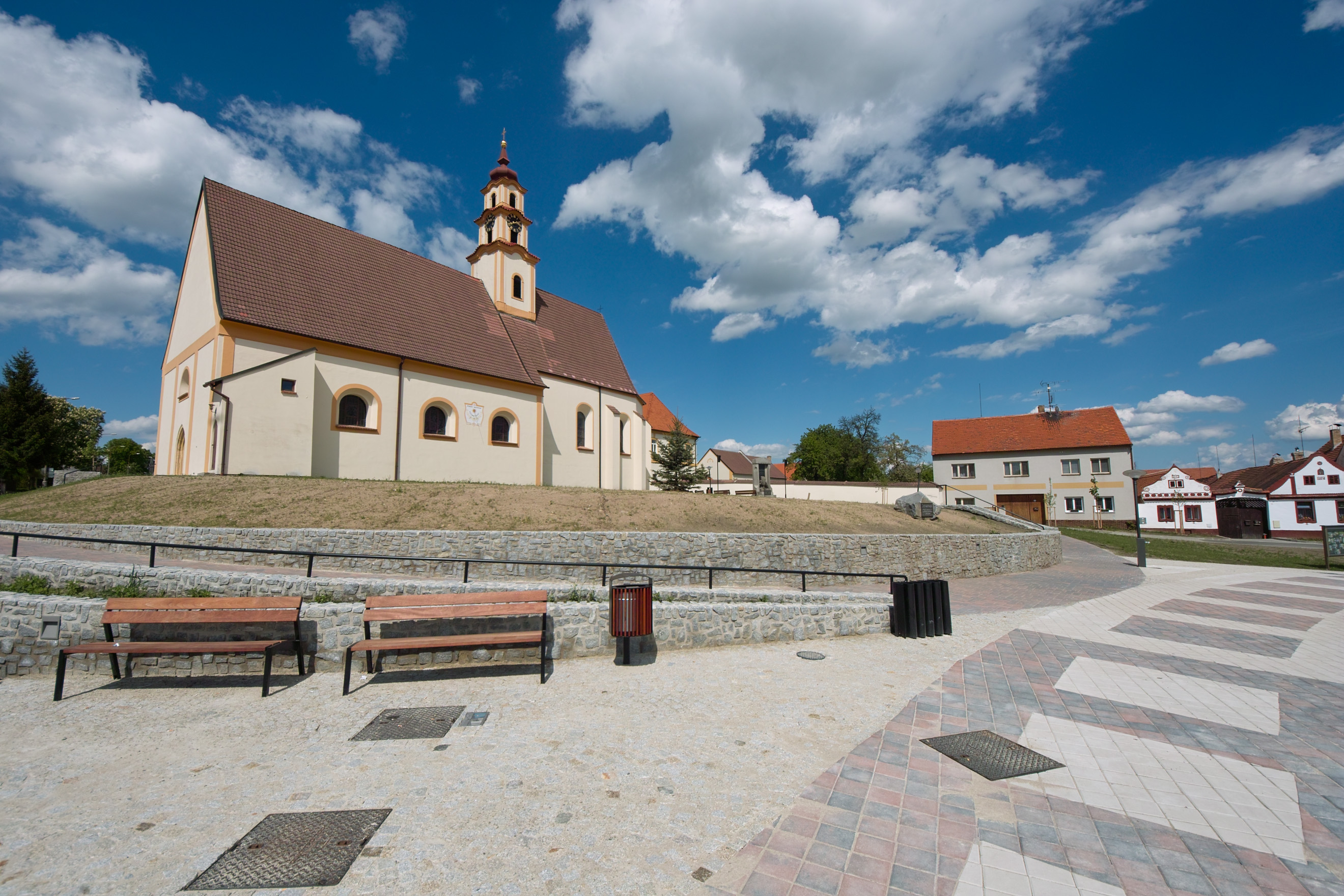
- Town square with the Church of Saint Nicholas

- Flag Coat of arms

- Location in the Czech Republic
- Coordinates: 49°6′0″N 14°34′20″E
- Country: Czech Republic
- Region: South Bohemian
- District: České Budějovice
- First mentioned: 1356

Area
  - Total: 8.11 km^{2} (3.13 sq mi)
- Elevation: 484 m (1,588 ft)

Population (2026-01-01)
  - Total: 1,388
  - Density: 171/km^{2} (443/sq mi)
- Time zone: UTC+1 (CET)
  - Summer (DST): UTC+2 (CEST)
- Postal code: 373 63
- Website: www.sevetin.cz

Ševětín (Czech pronunciation: [ˈʃɛvjɛciːn]) is a market town in České Budějovice District in the South Bohemian Region of the Czech Republic. It has about 1,400 inhabitants.

== Etymology ==
The initial name of the settlement was Šebětín. The name was derived from the personal name Šebata (a shortened form of Šebestián, which is a Czech version of the name Sebastian), meaning "Šebata's (court)".

== Geography ==
Ševětín is located about 15 kilometres (9 mi) northeast of České Budějovice. It lies on the border between the Tábor Uplands and Třeboň Basin. The highest point is at 513 m (1,683 ft) above sea level. There are several fishponds in the municipal territory.

== History ==
The first written mention of Ševětín is from 1356, when it was part of the Lomnice estate. In 1382, the estate was acquired by King Wenceslaus IV. During the Hussite Wars, Ševětín was conquered by the Hussites and managed by Jan Roháč of Dubá. In 1435, the Lomnice estate was acquired by Oldřich II of Rosenberg. He joined Ševětín to the Třeboň estate, which remained so until the establishment of an independent municipality in 1848.

The main period of development and prosperity occurred during the reign of last Rosenbergs in the second half of the 16th century and at the beginning of the 17th century. During the Thirty Years' War, Ševětín was badly damaged. From 1660, the Třeboň estate with Ševětín was owned by the Schwarzenberg family.

In 2008, the municipality was promoted to a market town. It is a rare case that a municipality that has never held this title in the past has received the title.

== Demographics ==
Historical population

Year	Pop.	±%
1869	532	—
1880	573	+7.7%
1890	639	+11.5%
1900	623	−2.5%
1910	713	+14.4%

Year	Pop.	±%
1921	768	+7.7%
1930	883	+15.0%
1950	750	−15.1%
1961	870	+16.0%
1970	977	+12.3%

Year	Pop.	±%
1980	1,108	+13.4%
1991	1,191	+7.5%
2001	1,289	+8.2%
2011	1,301	+0.9%
2021	1,367	+5.1%

Source: Censuses

== Economy ==
Ševětín Solar Park, the third-largest photovoltaic power plant in the Czech Republic, is located in Ševětín.

Ševětín is known for a stone quarry.

== Transport ==
The D3 motorway (part of the European route E55) from České Budějovice to Tábor runs next to the market town.

Ševětín is located on the railway line České Budějovice–Veselí nad Lužnicí, which further continues to Tábor or to Jindřichův Hradec.

== Sights ==
The main landmark of Ševětín is the Church of Saint Lawrence. Originally an early Gothic building from the 13th century, it was rebuilt several times. Several valuable construction elements of the original medieval church have been preserved to this day.
