= Ralsko Solar Park =

Solar power stations in the Czech Republic

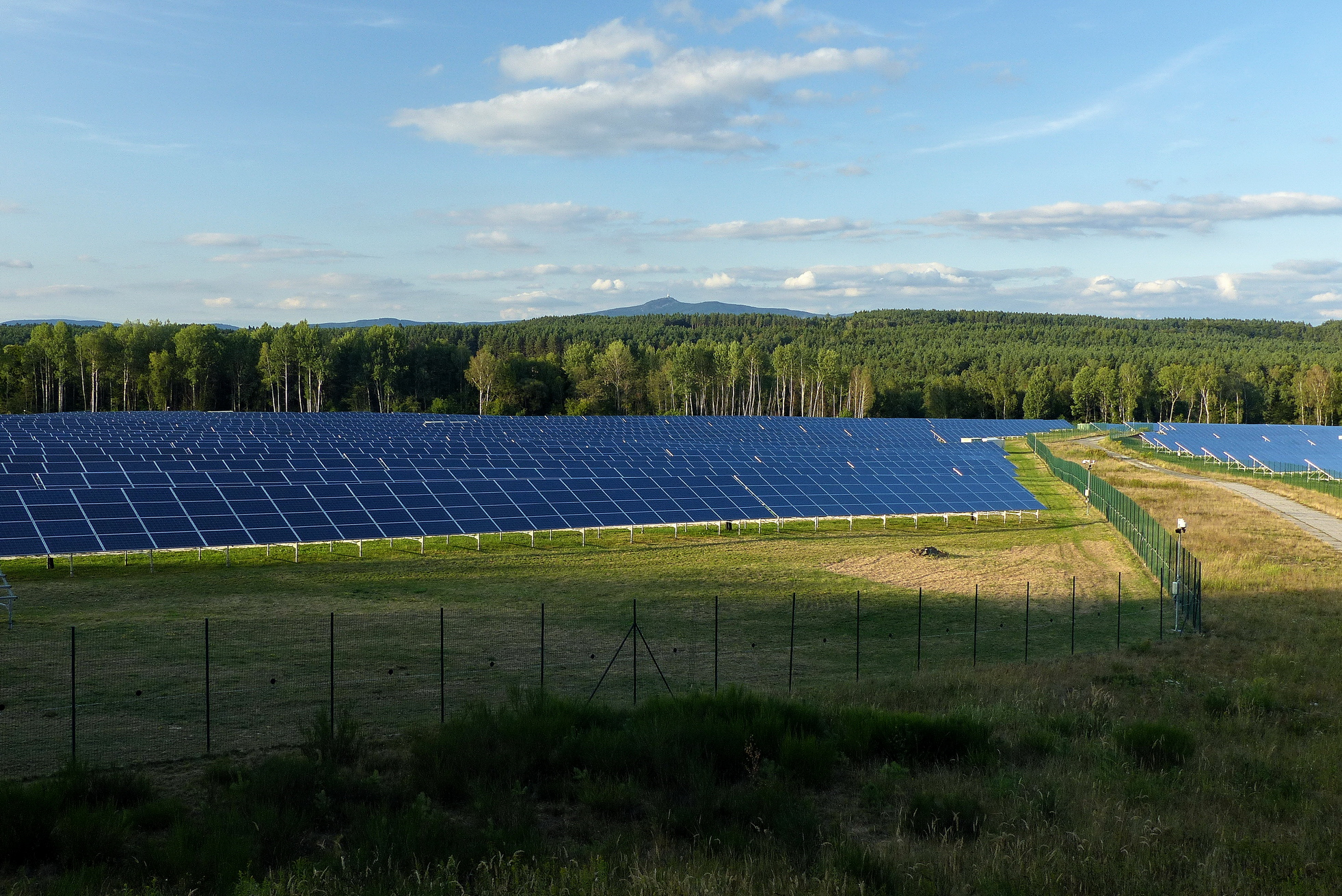
- Country: Czech Republic
- Location: Ústí
- Coordinates: 50°35′58″N 14°53′30″E
- Status: Operational
- Commission date: December 2010
- Owner: CEZ Group
- Operator: ČEZ Obnovitelné zdroje

Solar farm
- Type: Flat-panel PV

Power generation
- Nameplate capacity: 38.3 MW

Ralsko Solar Park (Czech: Fotovoltaická elektrárna Ralsko) is the largest photovoltaic power station in the Czech Republic. It was one of the 50 largest photovoltaic power plants in the world when it was built. It consists of five sections, of 14.269 MW, 12.869 MW, 6.614 MW and 4.517 MW, located kilometers apart, for a total of 38.3 MW, sufficient for 10,000 households. It was built in a former military area.
