= Convention on Environmental Impact Assessment in a Transboundary Context =

The Convention on Environmental Impact Assessment in a Transboundary Context (informally called the Espoo Convention) is a United Nations Economic Commission for Europe (UNECE) convention signed in Espoo, Finland, in 1991 that entered into force in 1997. The Convention sets out the obligations of Parties—that is States that have agreed to be bound by the Convention—to carry out an environmental impact assessment of certain activities at an early stage of planning. It also lays down the general obligation of States to notify and consult each other on all major projects under consideration that are likely to have a significant adverse environmental impact across boundaries.

As of April 2014, the treaty had been ratified by 44 states and the European Union.

== Amendments ==
The convention has been amended twice. The first amendment was adopted in Sofia in 2001; it has entered into force 26 August 2014. It opens the convention to accession upon approval by United Nations Member States that are not members of the UNECE. The second amendment was adopted in Cavtat, Croatia, in 2004; as for the September 2016, it is not in force yet.Once in force it will: allow, as appropriate, affected Parties to participate in scoping; require reviews of compliance; revise the convention's Appendix I (list of activities); and make other minor changes.

== Procedure ==
The Convention involves a Party (or Parties) of origin (States where an activity is planned) and an affected Party (or Parties) (States whose territory may be significantly adversely affected by the activity). The convention's main procedural steps are:

- application of the convention by the Party of origin (Art. 2.2, 2.5/App. I+III)
- notification of the affected Party by the Party of origin (Art. 3.1)
- confirmation of participation by the affected Party (Art. 3.3)
- transmittal of information from the affected Party to the Party of origin (Art. 3.6)
- public participation in the affected Party (Art. 3.8)
- preparation of EIA documentation (Art. 4/App. II)
- distribution of the EIA documentation for the purpose of participation of authorities and public of the affected Party (Art. 4.2)
- consultation between the concerned Parties (Art. 5)
- final decision by the Party of origin (Art. 6.1)
- transmittal of final decision documentation to the affected Party (Art. 6.2)
- post-project analysis (Art. 7.1/App. V)

== Inquiry commissions ==
Article 3(7) of the convention offers a procedure by which parties can solve differences by scientific, non-judicial means. The first case in which an inquiry commission was established under article 3(7) was that of the Bystroe Canal, at the request of Romania in 2004.

A case which involved countries far apart on the globe was raised by Micronesia, which claimed that the Czech coal-fired plant at Prunerov was significantly affecting its climate due to global warming.

== Related issues ==
The convention was also instrumental in the creation of Strategic Environmental Assessment and has been supplemented by a Protocol on Strategic Environmental Assessment.

== See also ==
- Environmental issues
