= Ševětín Solar Park =

T photovoltaic power plant in the Czech Republic

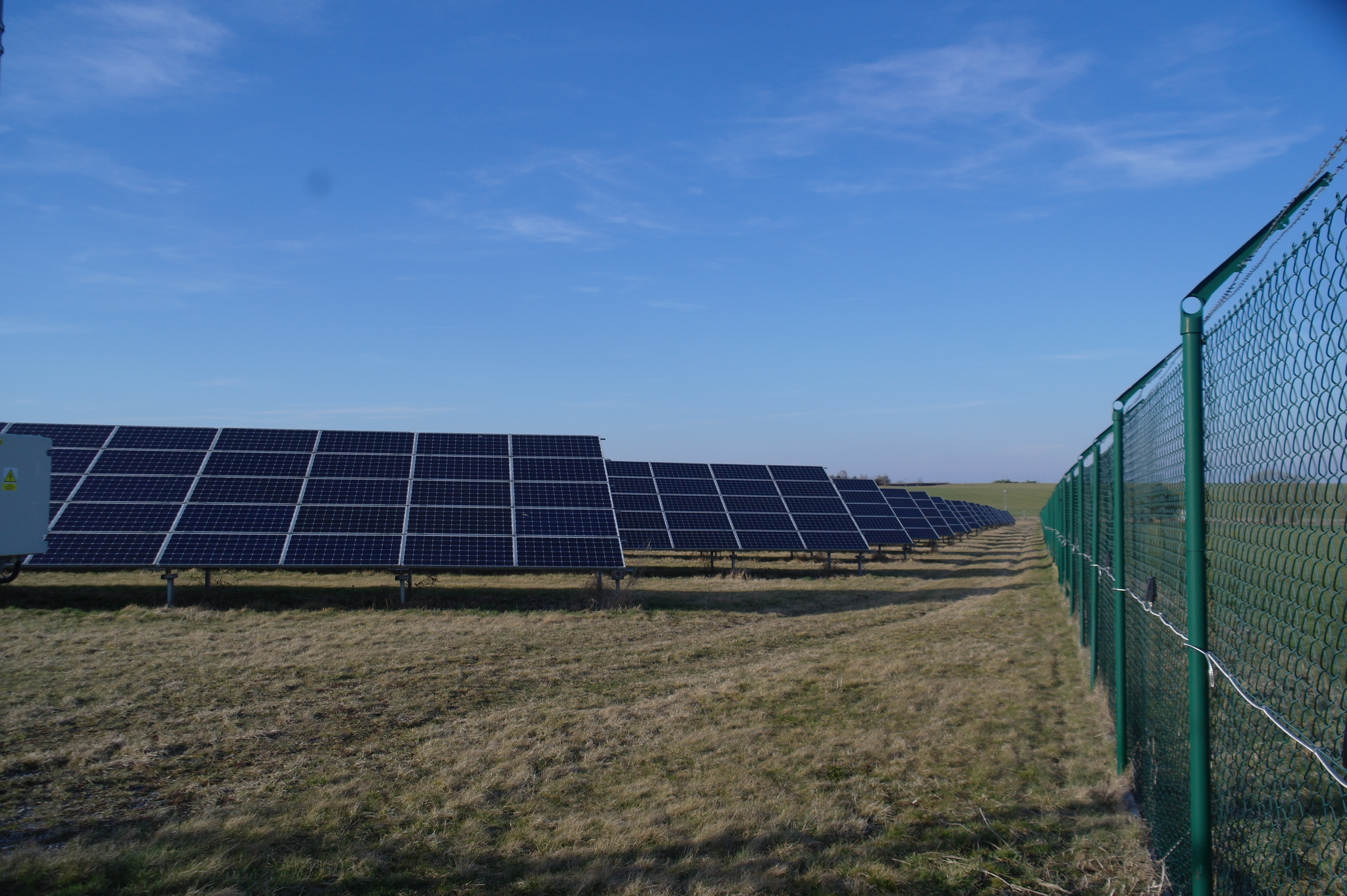
- Country: Czech Republic
- Location: Ševětín
- Coordinates: 49°07′16″N 14°34′56″E
- Status: Operational
- Commission date: December 2010
- Owner: CEZ Group
- Operator: ČEZ OZ uzavřený investiční fond

Solar farm
- Type: Flat-panel PV
- Site area: 60 hectares (148 acres)

Power generation
- Nameplate capacity: 29.902 MW

External links
- Commons: Related media on Commons

Ševětín Solar Park (Czech: Fotovoltaická elektrárna Ševětín) is the third-largest photovoltaic power plant in the Czech Republic, while also being one of the 50 largest photovoltaic power plants in the world. At 29.9 megawatts (40,100 hp), it generates electricity sufficient for 8,000 households.

== See also ==
- List of photovoltaic power stations
