= Orlík Reservoir =

Hydroelectric dam in Czechia

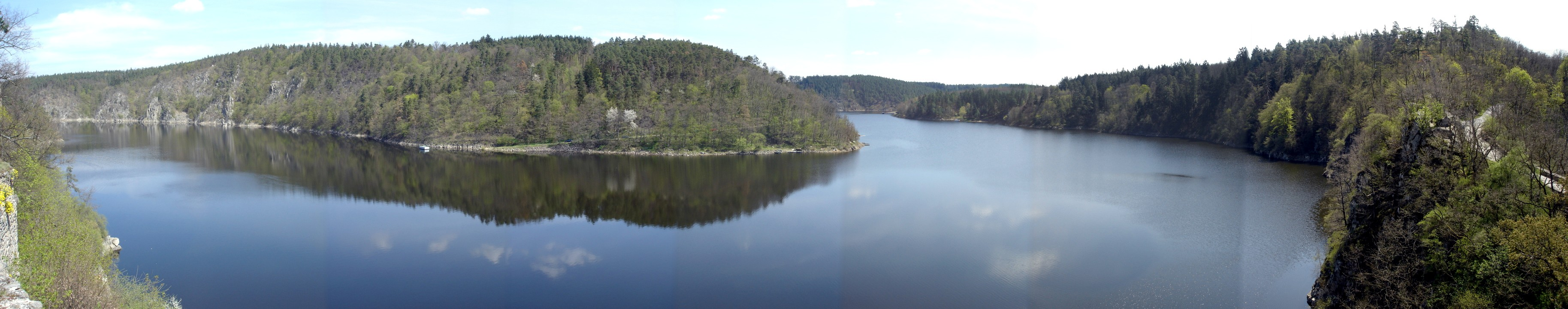
- View from Zvíkov Castle

- Location within Czech Republic
- Coordinates: 49°36′21.6″N 14°10′51.6″E
- Type: reservoir
- Primary inflows: Vltava River, Otava River
- Primary outflows: Vltava River
- Catchment area: 12,105 km^{2} (4,674 sq mi)
- Basin countries: Czech Republic
- Max. length: 68 km (42 mi)
- Surface area: 27.32 km^{2} (10.55 sq mi)
- Water volume: 703.8×10^{6} m^{3} (570,600 acre⋅ft)
- Surface elevation: 354 m (1,161 ft)

The Orlík Reservoir (Czech: Vodní nádrž Orlík) is the largest hydroelectric dam in the Czech Republic. It dams the Vltava River near the village of Solenice, which is near the town of Příbram. The structure is named after Orlík Castle, which is situated a few kilometers above the dam. The dam has four turbines with a nominal capacity of 91 MW each having a total capacity of 364 MW.

== Construction ==
Preparatory construction work for the future Orlík water reservoir began as early as 1954, even before the project was officially approved by the government of the time. During construction, over 1,500 workers rotated daily, and the project claimed two lives. The resulting artificial lake necessitated the removal of 14 mills, a large number of sawmills, and 650 residential and farm buildings. A long railway siding from Tochovice was built specifically for the construction of the dam.

Structurally, the dam was completed and officially put into operation on 22 December 1961, eight months ahead of the scheduled completion date. The last (fourth) turbine of the hydroelectric power plant was commissioned on 10 April 1962.

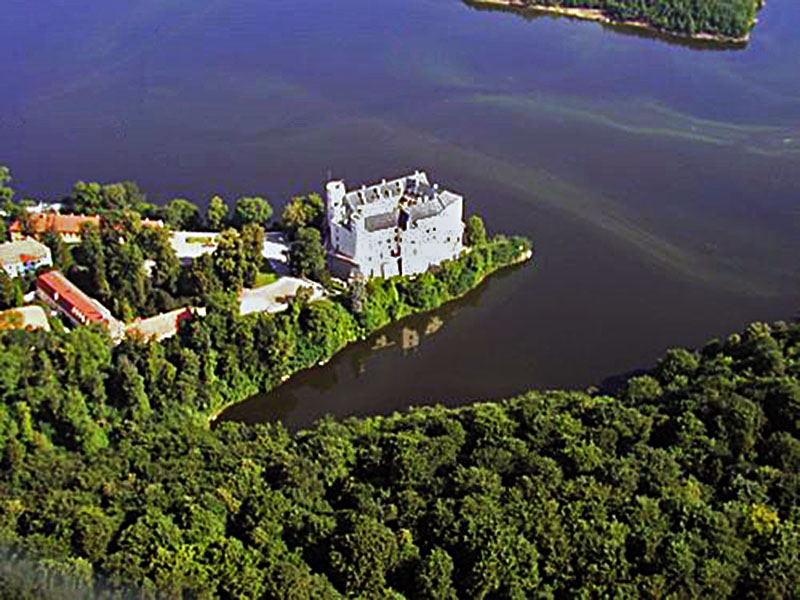
Orlík Castle

== See also ==
- List of dams and reservoirs in the Czech Republic
- List of lakes in the Czech Republic
- Media related to Orlík Reservoir at Wikimedia Commons
