= Horní Počaply =

- Municipality
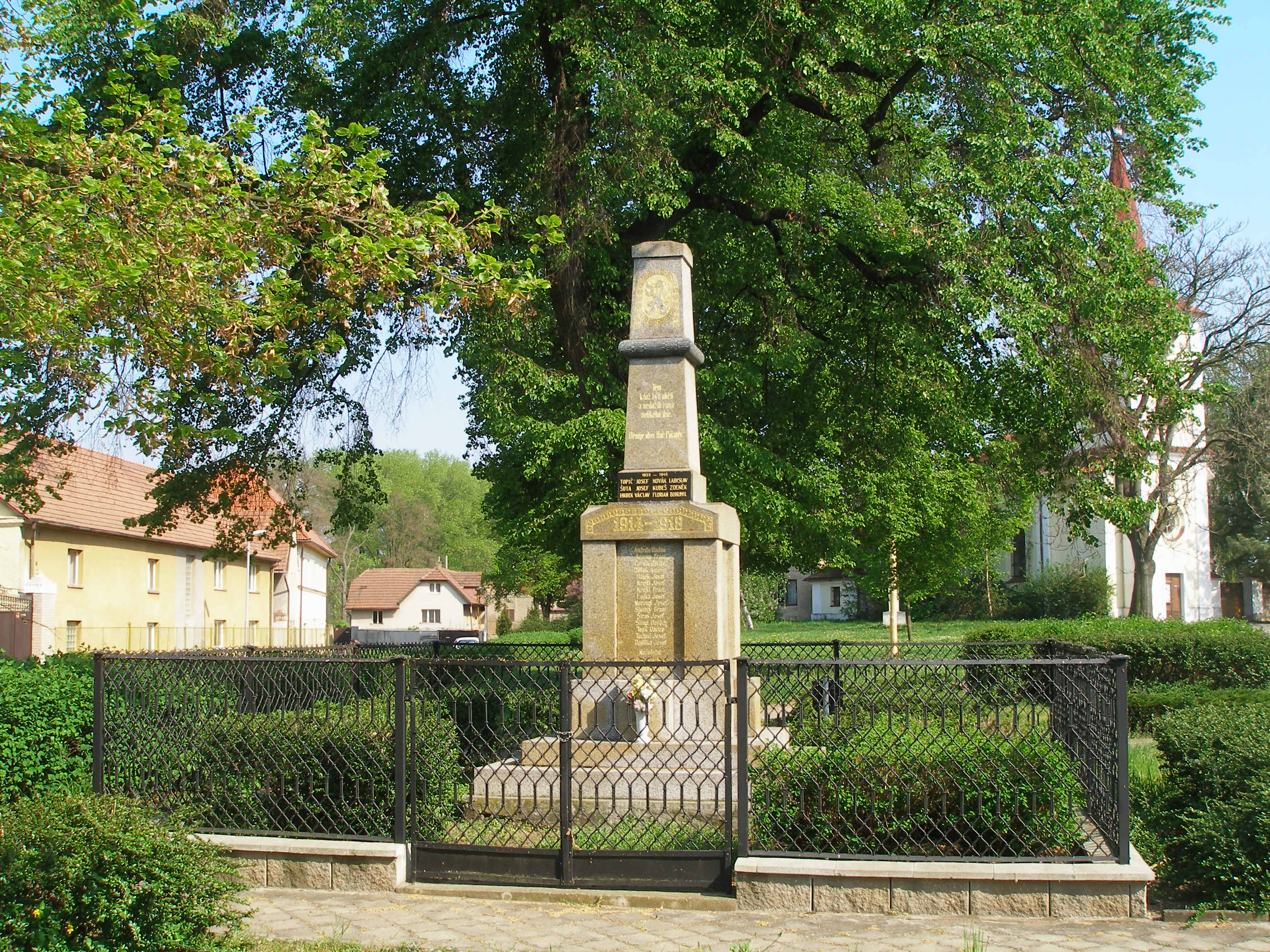
- Monument to the fallen in both World Wars

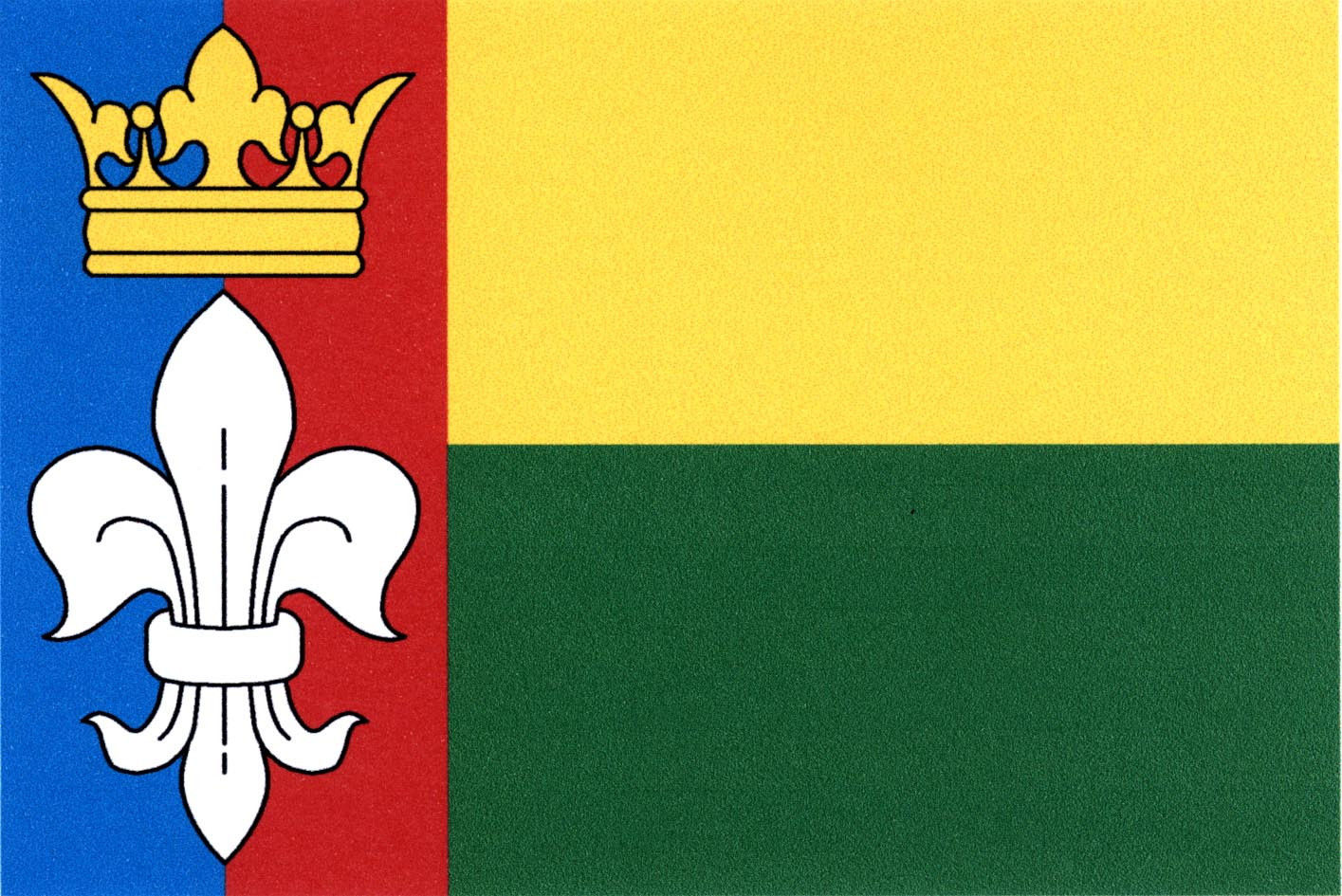
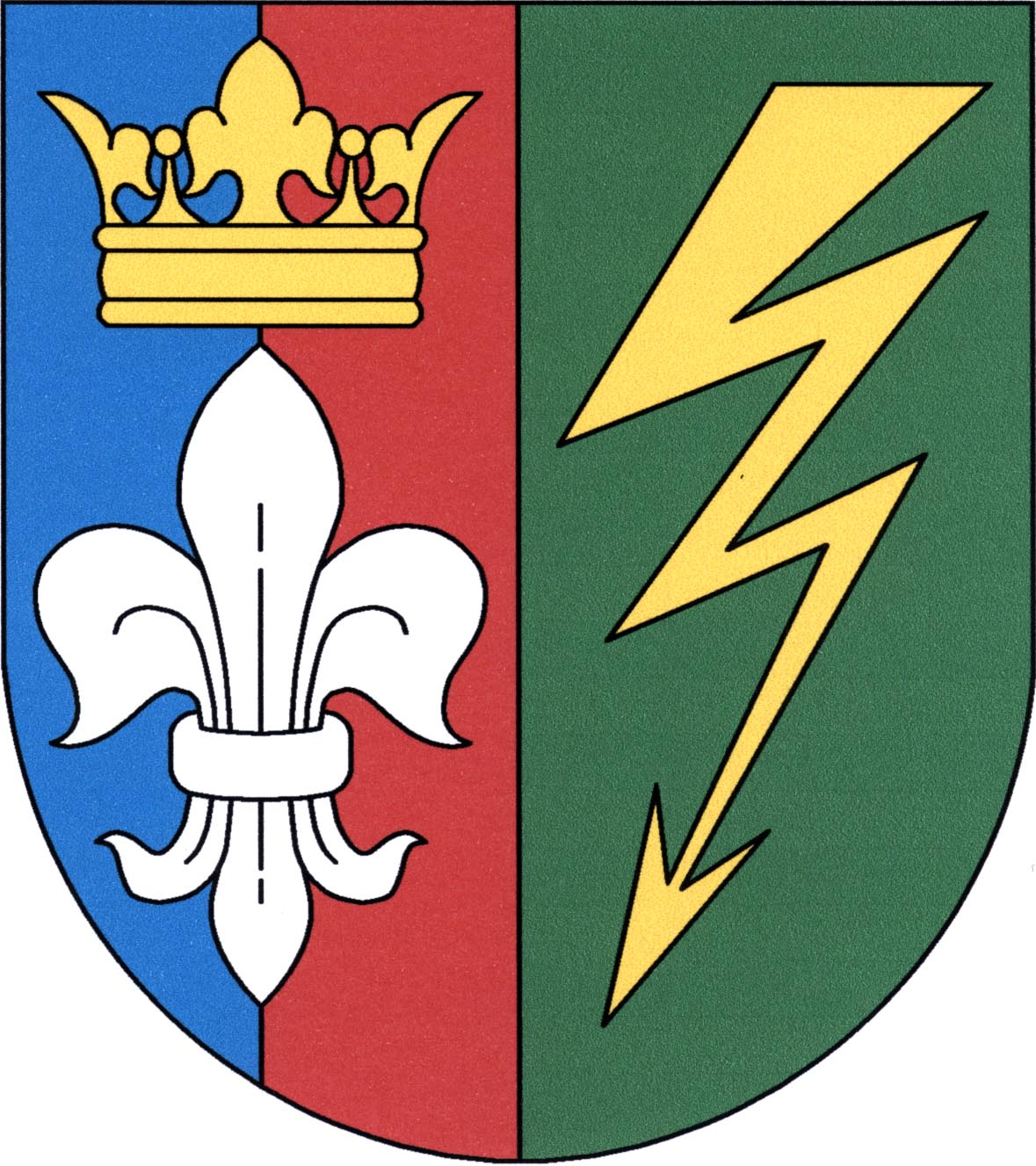
- Flag Coat of arms

- Location in the Czech Republic
- Coordinates: 50°25′28″N 14°23′24″E
- Country: Czech Republic
- Region: Central Bohemian
- District: Mělník
- First mentioned: 1288

Area
  - Total: 12.39 km^{2} (4.78 sq mi)
- Elevation: 160 m (520 ft)

Population (2026-01-01)
  - Total: 1,225
  - Density: 98.87/km^{2} (256.1/sq mi)
- Time zone: UTC+1 (CET)
  - Summer (DST): UTC+2 (CEST)
- Postal code: 277 03
- Website: www.hornipocaply.cz

Horní Počaply is a municipality and village in Mělník District in the Central Bohemian Region of the Czech Republic. It has about 1,200 inhabitants.

== Administrative division ==
Horní Počaply consists of two municipal parts (in brackets population according to the 2021 census):

- Horní Počaply (1,058)
- Křivenice (121)

== Etymology ==
The name Počaply is derived from the word počapl, which was the nickname of the local inhabitants. It is not certain what its meaning was, but it was probably a mocking nickname that the inhabitants received from neighbouring villages. It could have been derived from the verb čapnouti, which meant 'catch' or dialectically 'squat'. The prefix horní means 'upper' and served to distinguigh it from the nearby village of Počaply (today a part of Terezín).

== Geography ==
Horní Počaply is located about 8 kilometres (5 mi) northwest of Mělník and 34 km (21 mi) north of Prague. It lies in a flat landscape in the Lower Ohře Table. The municipality is situated on the left bank of the Elbe River.

== History ==
The first written mention of Horní Počaply is in a deed of King Wenceslaus II from 1288. The village was divided into two parts and one was part of the Dolní Beřkovice estate from 1465, the other belonged to the Horní Beřkovice estate. This lasted until 1850, when an independent municipality was established.

== Demographics ==
Historical population

Year	Pop.	±%
1869	1,002	—
1880	930	−7.2%
1890	1,018	+9.5%
1900	1,073	+5.4%
1910	1,034	−3.6%

Year	Pop.	±%
1921	968	−6.4%
1930	955	−1.3%
1950	844	−11.6%
1961	1,105	+30.9%
1970	1,255	+13.6%

Year	Pop.	±%
1980	1,348	+7.4%
1991	1,228	−8.9%
2001	1,200	−2.3%
2011	1,456	+21.3%
2021	1,179	−19.0%

Source: Censuses

== Transport ==
Horní Počaply is located on the railway line Prague–Ústí nad Labem.

== Sights ==
The main landmark of Horní Počaply is the Church of the Assumption of the Virgin Mary. It is originally a Gothic church from the 13th or 14th century, rebuilt in the neo-Gothic style in 1869–1871.
