= ČEZ Group =

Czech energy conglomerate

- Type: Public
- Traded as: PSE: BAACEZ; WSE: CEZ
- ISIN: CZ0005112300
- Industry: Energy
- Founded: 1992
- Headquarters: Prague, Czech Republic
- Key people: Daniel Beneš (chairman and CEO)
- Products: Electricity, district heating, natural gas
- Services: Electricity generation, energy distribution and supply, energy services
- Revenue: ▼CZK 333.39 billion (2025)
- Operating income: ▼CZK 80.15 billion (2025)
- Net income: ▼CZK 27.40 billion (2025)
- Total assets: ▼CZK 864.61 billion (2025)
- Total equity: ▲CZK 249.95 billion (2025)
- Owner: Czech Republic through the Ministry of Finance (69.78%, 2025)
- Number of employees: 33,590 (2025)
- Website: www.cez.cz/en/

ČEZ Group (Czech: Skupina ČEZ, České Energetické Závody) is an energy group headquartered in Prague and the largest electricity producer in the Czech Republic. Its shares trade on the Prague and Warsaw stock exchanges. The Czech government owns approximately 70% of its shares. The parent company was established in 1992, succeeding the state enterprise České energetické závody.

Most of ČEZ’s electricity comes from its nuclear and coal-fired power stations. It owns the Dukovany and Temelín nuclear plants and also generates electricity from natural gas, water, wind and solar power. Its other businesses include electricity and natural gas distribution and supply, heat production, coal mining and energy trading. Most of its revenue comes from the Czech Republic. The group also operates elsewhere in Europe, including engineering, construction and energy-efficiency businesses through its subsidiaries.

ČEZ is reducing coal-fired generation and investing in nuclear power, gas-fired plants and distribution networks. In June 2026, shareholders approved a restructuring to place distribution, trading and customer businesses in a separate subsidiary, with the possibility of selling a minority stake. The government intends to use the restructuring to help finance a buyout of minority shareholders.

== Power stations ==
The following table lists selected ČEZ Group generating facilities and their installed electrical capacity as of 31 December 2025. Facilities are in the Czech Republic unless another country is indicated.

Selected generating facilities
Facility	Type	Electrical capacity (MW)
Dukovany	Nuclear	2,096
Temelín	Nuclear	2,250
Dětmarovice	Coal-fired	600
Energotrans II	Coal-fired	220
Ledvice III	Coal-fired	110
Ledvice IV	Coal-fired	660
Prunéřov II	Coal-fired	750
Tušimice II	Coal-fired	800
Hodonín	Coal and biomass	107
Poříčí II	Coal and biomass	165
Počerady II	Gas-fired combined cycle	845
Kamýk	Hydroelectric	40
Lipno I	Hydroelectric	139
Orlík	Hydroelectric	364
Slapy	Hydroelectric	144
Střekov	Hydroelectric	19.5
Štěchovice I	Hydroelectric	22.5
Vrané	Hydroelectric	14
Dalešice	Pumped storage	475
Dlouhé Stráně I	Pumped storage	650
Štěchovice II	Pumped storage	45
Janov	Wind	4.1
Věžnice	Wind	4.2
Lettweiler Höhe (Germany)	Wind	35.4
Datteln (Germany)	Wind	11.4
Nortorf (Germany)	Wind	11.4
Aschères-le-Marché (France)	Wind	12
Neuville-aux-Bois (France)	Wind	15
Ralsko	Solar photovoltaic	55.7
Ševětín	Solar photovoltaic	30
Vranovská Ves	Solar photovoltaic	16
Deubach (Germany)	Solar photovoltaic	48.4

Dětmarovice's generation licence expired on 27 February 2026. Hodonín and Poříčí II also supply heat; their capacities above refer only to electricity generation.

=== Electricity capacity, generation and emissions ===
Year	Installed capacity (MW)	Gross generation (GWh)	Emissions intensity (t CO_{2}e/MWh)
2017	14,864	62,887	0.41
2018	14,848	63,081	0.40
2019	14,643	64,635	0.38
2020	12,933	60,946	0.34
2021	11,832	56,008	0.29
2022	11,836	54,302	0.29
2023	11,943	51,451	0.27
2024	12,067	50,618	0.27
2025	11,584	51,185	0.24

Capacity and generation figures are from ČEZ's 2019 annual report for 2017–2019, and its consolidated operating indicators for 2020–2025. Emissions-intensity figures are from the 2024 Sustainable Financing Framework for 2017–2022, the 2023 sustainability report for 2023, and the 2025 annual report for 2024–2025.

Emissions intensity covers electricity and heat generation; changes in the group's generating portfolio affect comparisons between years.

== Operations ==
ČEZ Group’s main business is in the Czech Republic. It also operates power plants and provides energy services in other European countries.

=== Distribution and supply ===
ČEZ Distribuce operates an electricity distribution network covering about two-thirds of Czech territory. More than 3.8 million delivery points were connected to it at the end of 2025. Another subsidiary, ČEZ Prodej, sells electricity and natural gas to households and businesses.

GasNet’s distribution network covers most of the country, excluding Prague and South Bohemia. Gas Distribution serves South Bohemia and part of Vysočina and joined ČEZ Group in January 2026.

=== Energy services ===
==== ESCO ====
ČEZ set up ČEZ ESCO in 2014 to bring its Czech energy-services businesses together. It works with companies, municipalities and public institutions on the construction and modernisation of energy systems. ESCO installs and maintains heating and cooling systems, rooftop solar systems and charging stations, as well as supplying electricity, natural gas and heat.

Through its subsidiary ENESA, it carries out building improvements paid for from the resulting energy savings. These contracts guarantee a level of savings, with ENESA paying the difference if the agreed target is missed. ČEZ Energo owns and operates combined heat and power units, while ČEZ Teplárenská supplies district heating. Its subsidiary Domat Control System develops hardware and software to monitor energy use.

==== Elevion ====
Elevion’s subsidiaries provide engineering, construction and maintenance services for building systems, industrial energy installations and renewable-energy plants. The group also offers energy contracting, under which it finances and operates equipment used to supply customers with energy. Through Belectric, Elevion builds solar power plants and provides maintenance services.

The group develops automation and energy-management software through its subsidiary Hermos. Hermos’s FIS software brings building equipment from different manufacturers into a common control system. FIS Energy records energy use and produces consumption and emissions reports. Elevion also combines storage with energy services for industrial customers. In 2026, Elevion was planning three new battery projects in Germany. The batteries would serve industrial customers and also earn income from electricity trading, which Elevion would share with the customers.

=== Nuclear engineering and research ===
ČEZ’s subsidiary ŠKODA JS manufactures nuclear equipment and provides engineering, maintenance and modernisation services. It maintains equipment at Dukovany and Temelín and supplies components for nuclear plants abroad. In September 2026, it signed a contract to develop and supply control-rod drives for Rolls-Royce SMR.

ČEZ also holds a majority stake in ÚJV Řež, which carries out nuclear safety assessments and provides radioactive waste-management services. It also develops and produces radiopharmaceuticals. Its subsidiary Centrum výzkumu Řež operates two research reactors. LVR-15 is used to test materials and produce radionuclides for medicine. LR-0 is used for reactor-physics experiments and to validate models used in safety assessments. The centre also tests components for the ITER fusion project at its HELCZA facility in Plzeň.

=== Mining ===
Severočeské doly operates the Bílina and Nástup Tušimice open-pit brown-coal mines in northern Bohemia. Most of the coal goes to ČEZ Group’s power stations and heating plants. In 2025, the company sold 14.5 million tonnes, of which 11 million tonnes went to other ČEZ companies. Its permit allows mining at Bílina until the end of 2033.

ČEZ also has a majority stake in GEOMET through Severočeské doly. Together with European Metals Holdings, GEOMET is developing plans for an underground lithium mine at Cínovec and a processing plant nearby.

== Shareholders and stock listing ==
In 1994 a minor stake in the company was privatized using voucher privatization. If citizens invested all their vouchers (sold for 1000,- Kčs) in ČEZ, they gained 33 stocks (330 current shares after stock split). In 2007 the Czech government decided to gradually sell another 7% stake of ČEZ on the stock market, but due to the stock price fall during spring 2009, affected by 2008 financial crisis, selling was suspended. In 2008, the company decided to repurchase 9% of the company's shares.

As of 31 December 2025, the Czech Republic, represented by the Ministry of Finance, held 69.78% of ČEZ's share capital and 69.93% of its voting rights. Other shareholders with holdings above 1% were Belviport Trading Limited (2.42%), PPF banka (1.58%) and Chase Nominees Limited (1.26%).

The company is traded on the Prague, Warsaw, Frankfurt and RM-SYSTÉM Czech stock exchanges.

In October 2024, ČEZ took a 20% stake in Rolls-Royce SMR at a cost of "several hundred million pounds"; ČEZ plan to deploy up to 3 GWe of SMR generation capacity in the 2030s in the Czech Republic.

== Electric vehicle charging ==
ČEZ operates a public electric vehicle charging network in the Czech Republic under the futurego brand. Its first public charging station opened outside its headquarters in Prague on 30 November 2011.

By the end of 2025, ČEZ operated 1,048 public charging stations with a combined charging power of 109.5 MW. The stations delivered almost 15 GWh of electricity during the year. Its subsidiary ČEZ ESCO also installs charging stations for businesses and municipalities.

== Influence on politics ==
ČEZ is the largest utility and biggest public company in Central and Eastern Europe. Its influence on the Czech politics and connections to Russia have come under scrutiny. According to the Economist, "though nominally state-run, many see the power flowing the other way: from ČEZ's board into politics".

The management of ČEZ has financed the country's largest political parties – the Civic Democratic Party (ODS) and the Social Democrats (ČSSD). One analysis points out that the financing has resembled that coming from PPF and J&T, two firms which have been highly active in Russia since the early 1990s (for example, Russia was one of the first international expansion destinations of Home Credit, a PPF-owned lending company) and their senior management is known to have links to the former Czechoslovak StB security service and the Soviet KGB.

In 2010, a Czech court ruled that, as a state-owned company, ČEZ must disclose political activities.

Leaked pictures show politicians across political spectrum, including former Prime Minister Mirek Topolánek, holidaying with ČEZ lobbyists in Italy.

As of late 2010 the European Union was investigating ČEZ. The company's offices were raided in November 2010.

ČEZ was said to have selected a mysterious company called CEEI to construct a billion dollar nuclear storage facility for the Czech Republic. The company's paper trace ends in U.B.I.E, a company registered in Liechtenstein. Russia's honorary consul is named as its director. The company is believed to be under Russian control. CEEI's directors include Václav Klaus's former chief of staff (Jiří Kovář) and a man who is jail for kidnapping.

In 2015, ČEZ scored first in Deloitte CEE Top 500 according to market cap and forth in overall ranking.

== See also ==
- Energy in the Czech Republic
