= Solenice =

- Municipality
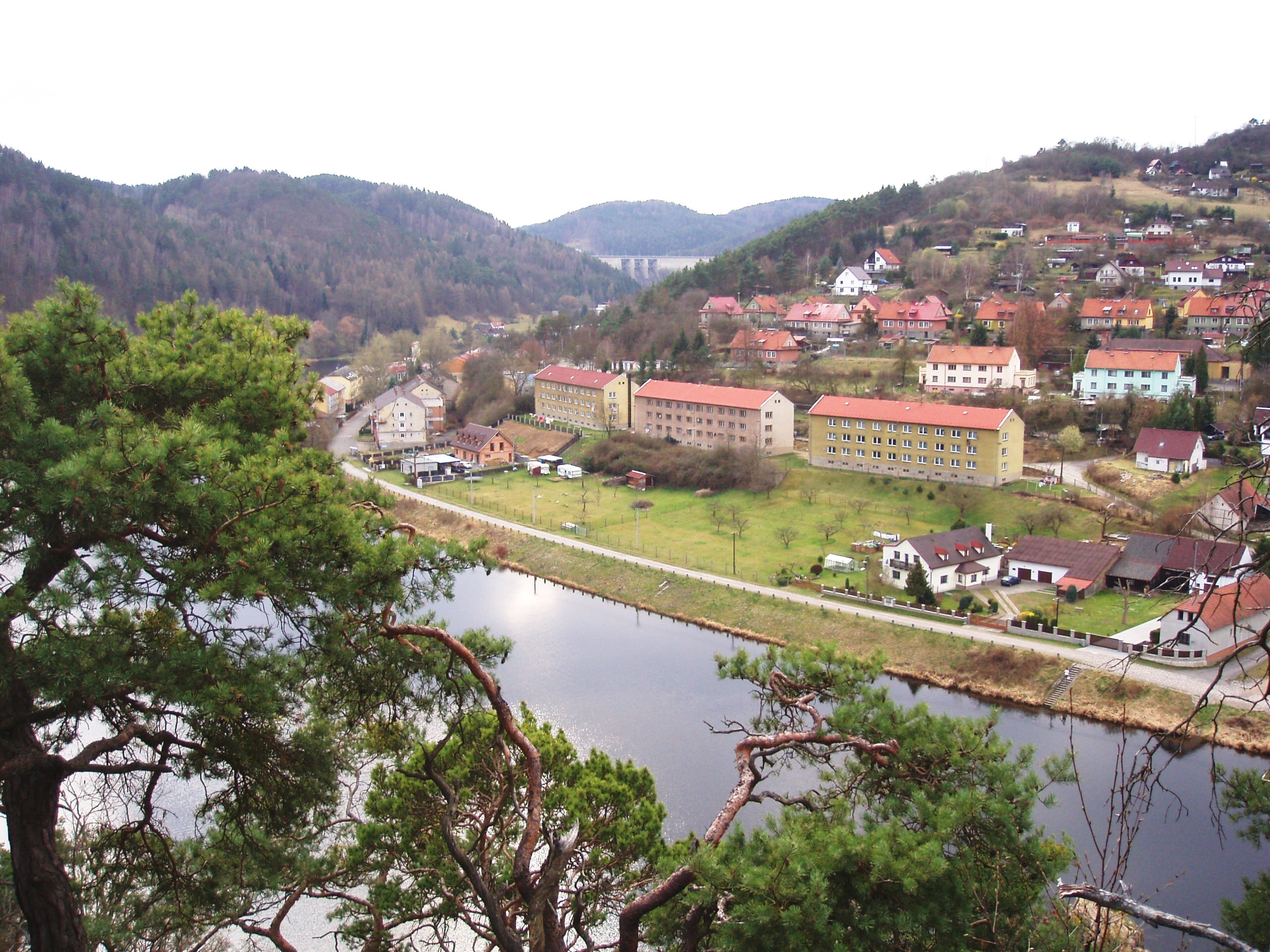
- General view

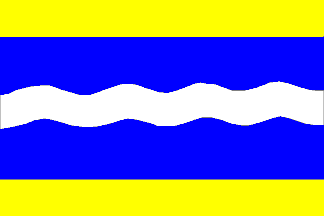
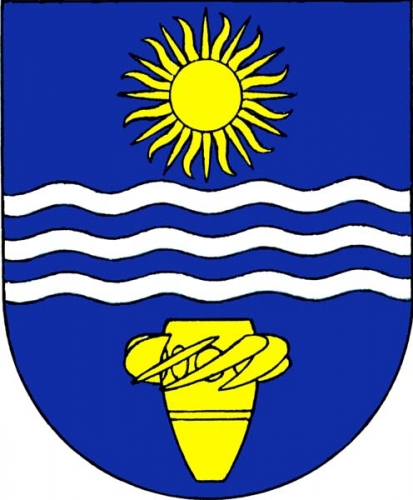
- Flag Coat of arms

- Location in the Czech Republic
- Coordinates: 49°37′4″N 14°11′45″E
- Country: Czech Republic
- Region: Central Bohemian
- District: Příbram
- First mentioned: 1430

Area
  - Total: 7.55 km^{2} (2.92 sq mi)
- Elevation: 286 m (938 ft)

Population (2026-01-01)
  - Total: 353
  - Density: 46.8/km^{2} (121/sq mi)
- Time zone: UTC+1 (CET)
  - Summer (DST): UTC+2 (CEST)
- Postal code: 262 63
- Website: www.obecsolenice.cz

Solenice is a municipality and village in Příbram District in the Central Bohemian Region of the Czech Republic. It has about 400 inhabitants.

== Administrative division ==
Solenice consists of three municipal parts (in brackets population according to the 2021 census):

- Solenice (349)
- Dolní Líšnice (15)
- Větrov (19)

== Demographics ==
Historical population
Year	Pop.	±%
1869	434	—
1880	416	−4.1%
1890	380	−8.7%
1900	374	−1.6%
1910	363	−2.9%
1921	312	−14.0%
1930	294	−5.8%
1950	176	−40.1%
1961	421	+139.2%
1970	567	+34.7%
1980	457	−19.4%
1991	374	−18.2%
2001	320	−14.4%
2011	381	+19.1%
2021	383	+0.5%
Source: Censuses
