= Slapy Hydroelectric Power Station =

Slapy
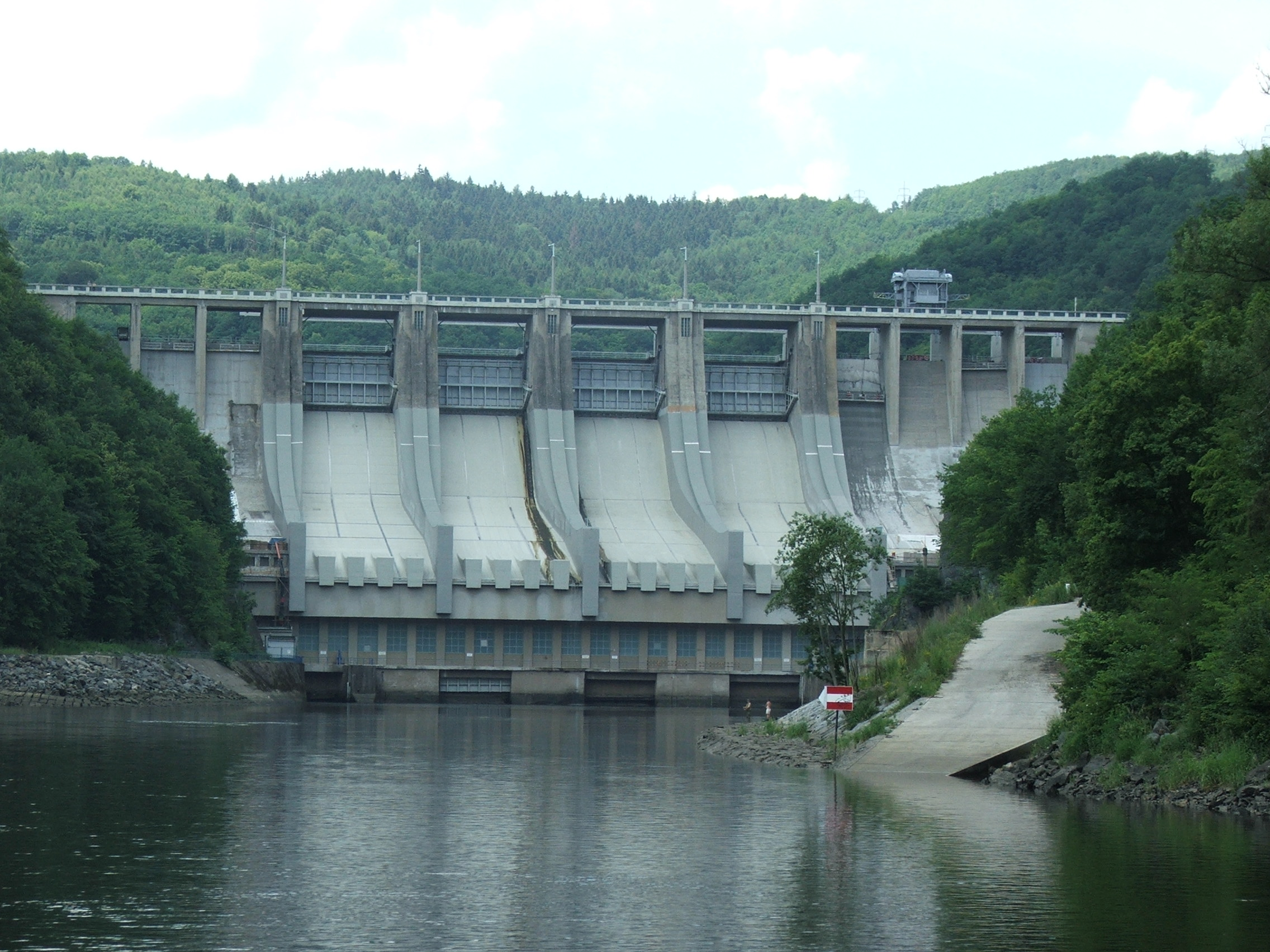

- Location within Czech Republic
- Location: Slapy, Czech Republic
- Coordinates: 49°49′25.31″N 14°26′3.24″E
- Type: reservoir
- Basin countries: Czech Republic

Slapy Hydro Power Plant (Czech: Vodní elektrárna Slapy) is a large power plant in the Czech Republic that has four turbines with a nominal capacity of 36 MW each having a total capacity of 144 MW.
