= Jakub Šebesta =

Czech politician

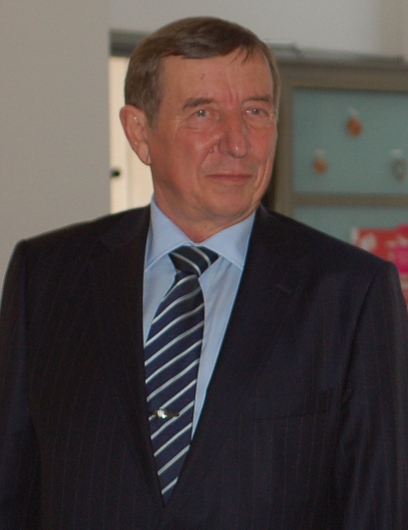

8th Minister of Agriculture
- In office 8 May 2009 – 13 June 2010
- Prime Minister: Jan Fischer
- Preceded by: Petr Gandalovič
- Succeeded by: Ivan Fuksa

10th Minister of Environment
- In office 22 March 2010 – 15 April 2010
- Prime Minister: Jan Fischer
- Preceded by: Jan Dusík
- Succeeded by: Rut Bízková

Personal details
- Born: 16 November 1948 (age 77) Krumvíř, Czechoslovakia
- Education: Mendel University in Brno

Jakub Šebesta (born 16 November 1948) is a Czech politician. He was the Minister of Agriculture and former Minister of Environment in the caretaker government of Jan Fischer.
