= List of tallest structures in the Czech Republic =

Plzeň-Krašov TV Transimitter - tallest building in the Czech Republic since October 15, 2026 (author ŠJů)

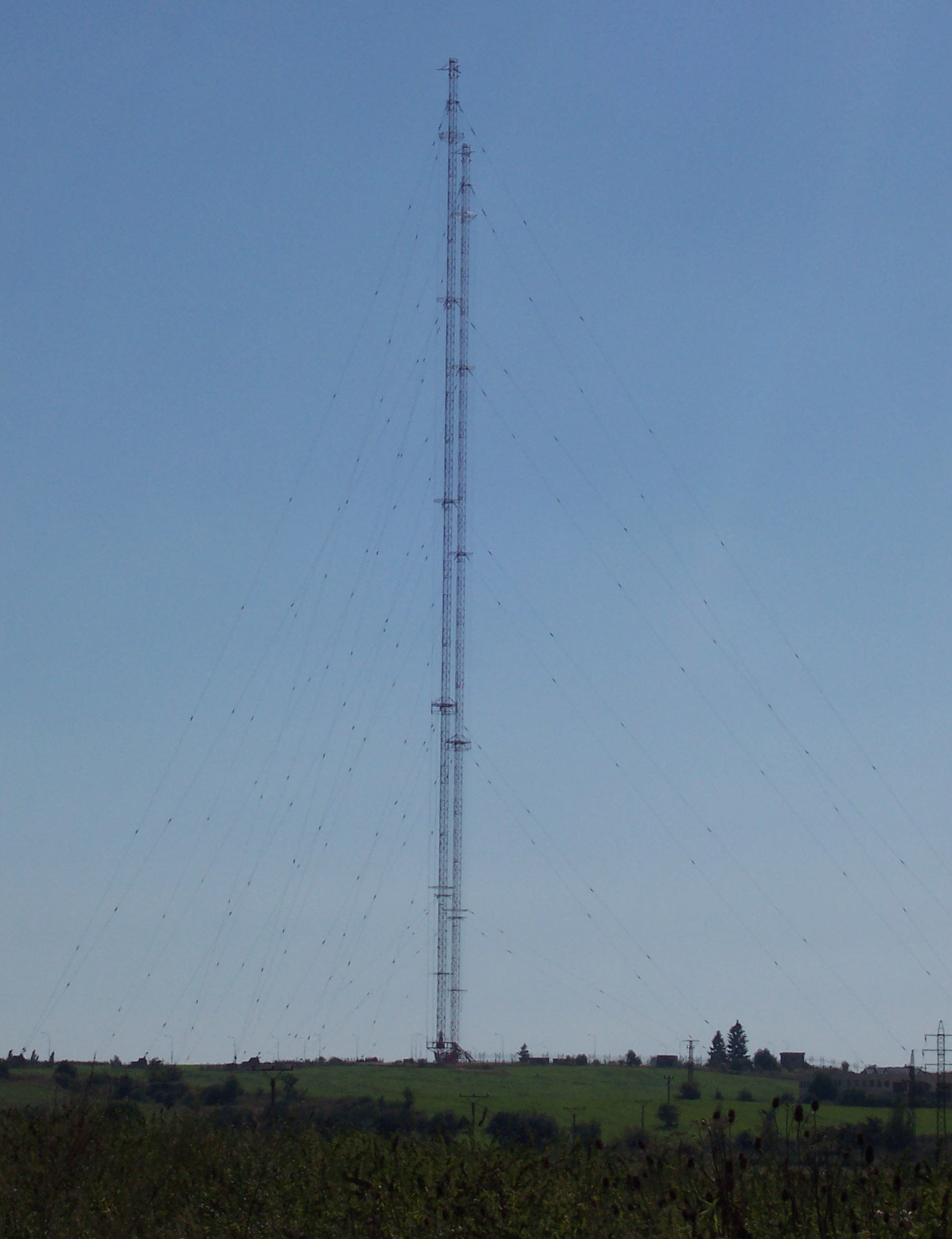
Former tallest masts and building in the Czech Republic by October 15, 2026 RKS Liblice 2 masts

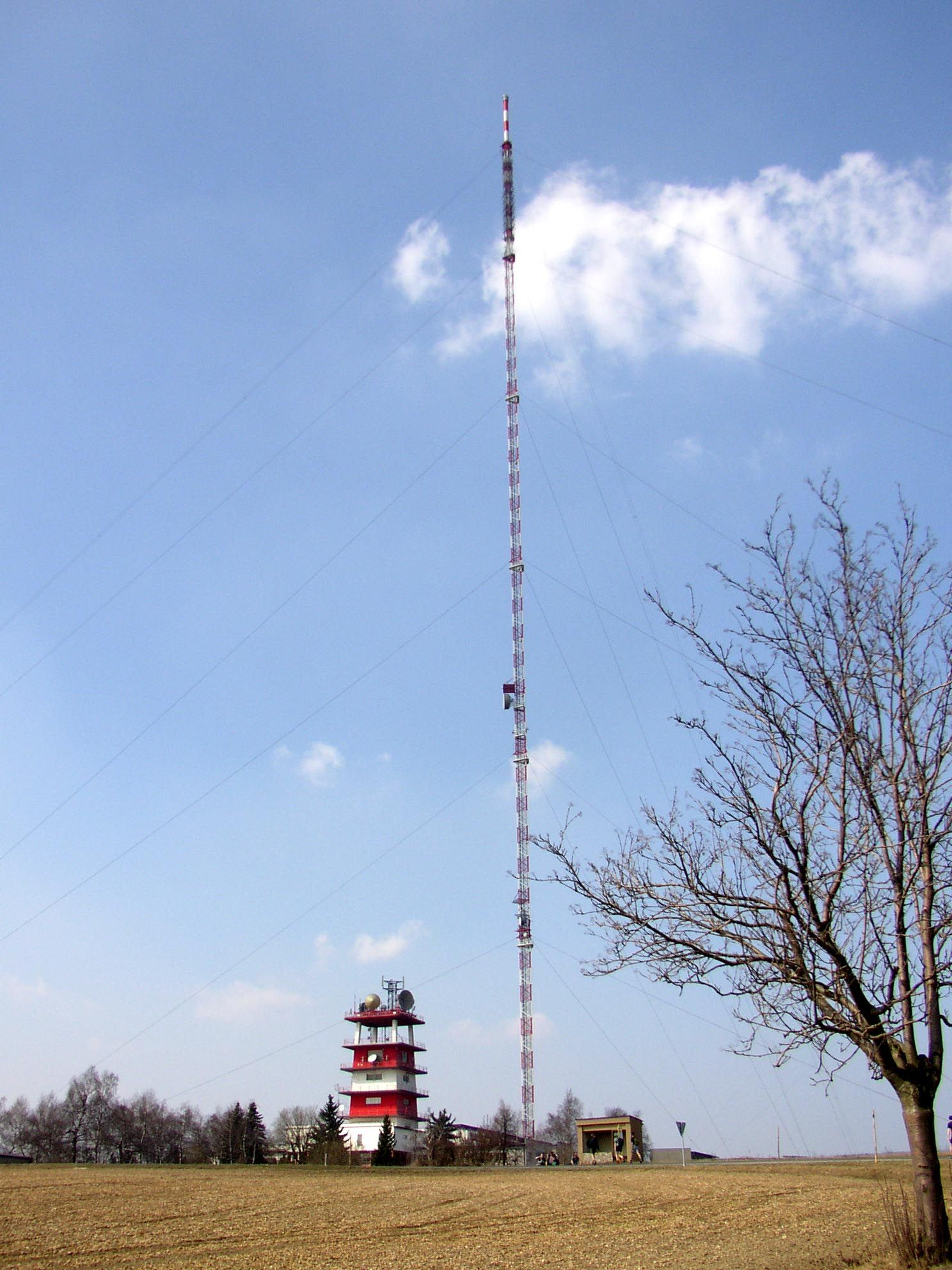
Transmitter Kojál mast

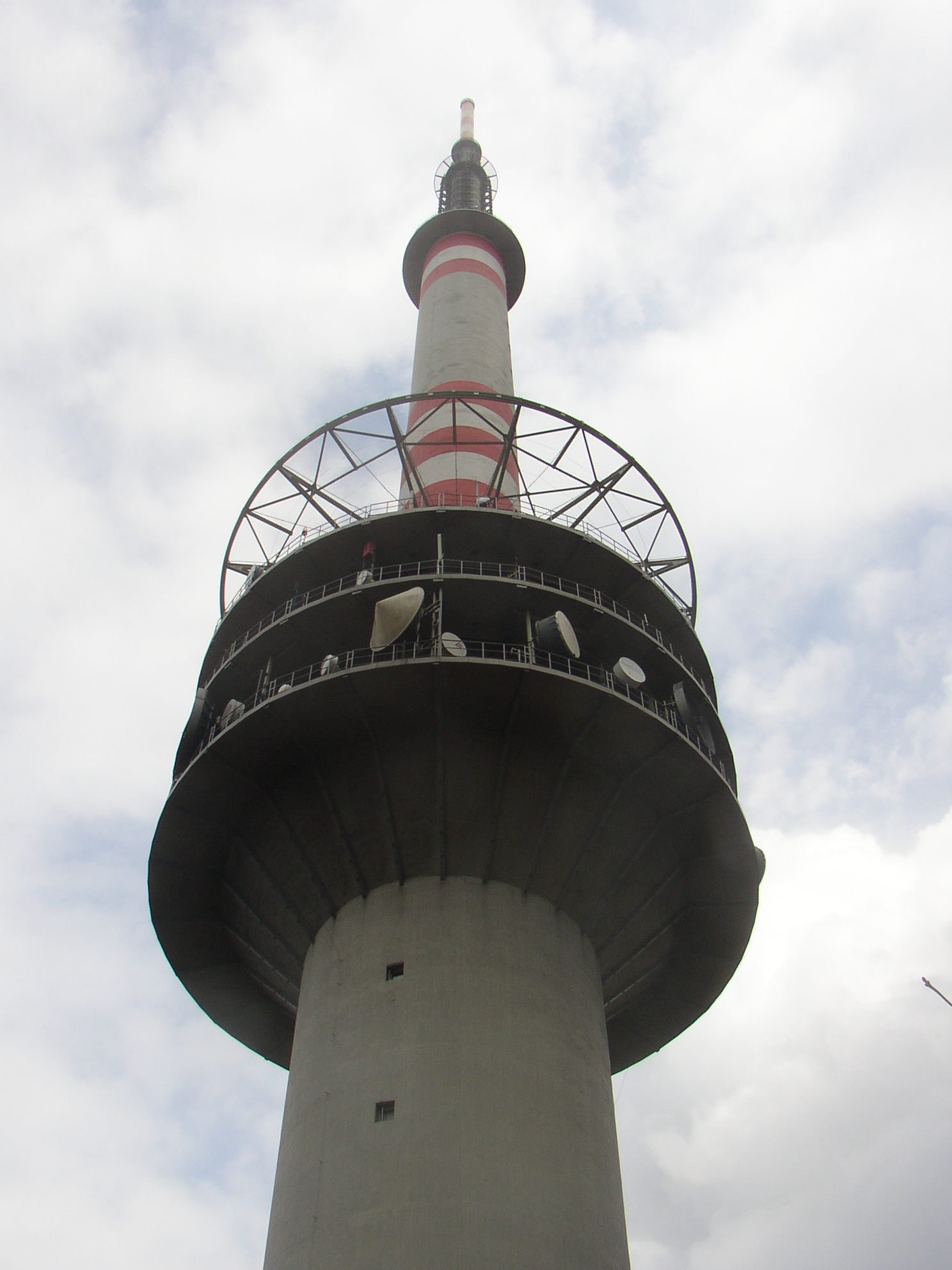
Buková hora TV Tower

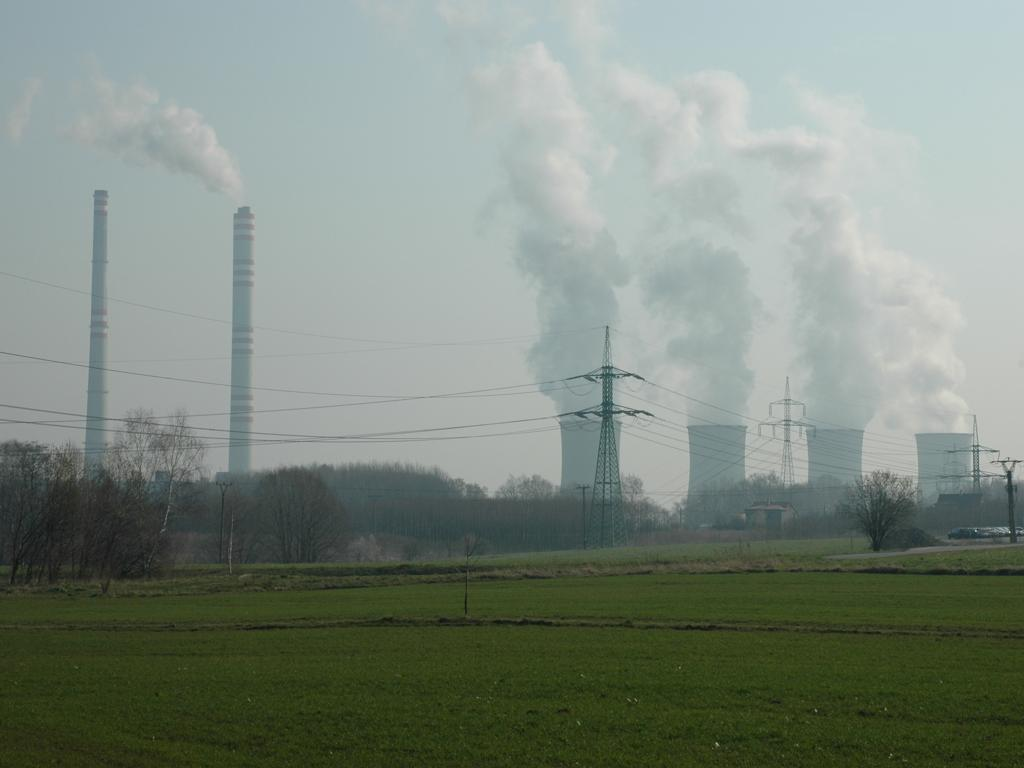
Chimneys of Dětmarovice Power Station

This is a list of the tallest structures in the Czech Republic. The list contains all types of structures, may be incomplete and should be expanded.

indicates a structure that has been demolished or dismantled or is otherwise no longer standing.

== Tallest ==
Name	Pinnacle height	Year	Structure type	Place	Coordinates	Remarks
RKS Liblice 2	355 m	1976	Guyed Mast	Liblice	50°3′43.37″N 14°53′11.27″E ; 50°3′47.12″N 14°53′12.84″E	it was 2 masts, former tallest masts used for mediumwave transmission in the world, demolished in October 15, 2026
Vysílač Krašov, new mast	347.5 m	1981	Guyed Mast	near Bezvěrov	49°59′44.02″N 13°04′45.66″E	tallest mast in the Czech Republic since October 15, 2026
Transmitter Kojál, new mast	339.5 m	1985	Guyed Mast	near Krásensko	49°22′12.33″N 16°48′57.89″E	tallest mast in Moravia Region in the Czech Republic and second tallest mast in the Czech Republic
Transmitter Kojál, old mast	322.4 m	1959	Guyed Mast	near Krásensko		dismantled in 1985
Vysílač Krašov, old mast	312.5 m	1974	Guyed Mast	near Bezvěrov		completed in 1960 with height 305 m, enlarged in 1974, collapsed in January 1979
Chimney of Prunéřov Power Station 2	301 m	1981	Chimney	Prunéřov	50°25′3.92″N 13°15′32.89″E	demolished in 2026
Chimney of Chvaletice Power Station	305 m	1977	Chimney	Chvaletice	50°1′38.91″N 15°27′11.9″E	
Chimney of Tušimice Power Station 2	300 m	1974	Chimney	Tušimice	50°22′56.19″N 13°20′24.42″E	demolished in 2012
Blaw-Knox Tower Liblice	280.4 m	1936	Guyed mast	Liblice		insulated against ground, demolished on October 17, 1972
Dětmarovice Power Station, Chimney Southeast	274 m	1975	Chimney	Dětmarovice	49°54′18.69″N 18°28′10.14″E	
Dětmarovice Power Station, Chimney Northwest	273 m	1975	Chimney	Dětmarovice	49°54′21.01″N 18°28′5.33″E	
Chimney of Mělník Power Station III	271 m	1971	Chimney	Horní Počaply	50°24′43.09″N 14°25′7.35″E	
Longwave transmitter Topolná	257 m	1951	Guyed Mast	Topolná	49°7′32.88″N 17°30′45.97″E ; 49°7′18.85″N 17°30′41.78″E	2 masts, demolished in 2022
Atmospheric station Křešín	250 m	2012	Guyed Mast	Košetice	49°34′20.78″N 15°04′4.82″E	
Buková hora TV Tower	223 m	1967	Concrete tower	Verneřice	50°40′17″N 14°13′44″E	
Litovel transmitter	220 m	1952	Guyed Mast	Litovel	49°42′38″N 17°3′23″E	3 masts, demolished in 2000
Chimney of Liberty Ostrava	220 m	1972	Chimney	Ostrava	49°47′40″N 18°18′48″E	
Chimneys of Trmice Power Plant	220 m	1976	Chimney	Trmice	50°38′41.09″N 13°59′12.29″E ; 50°38′39.48″N 13°59′20.48″E	2 chimneys
Chimney of Počerady Power Plant II	220 m	1977	Chimney	Počerady	50°25′35″N 13°40′38″E	
Chimney of Brno Maloměřice Heat Power Station	217 m	1982	Chimney	Brno	49°13′23″N 16°38′48″E	
Žižkov Television Tower	216 m	1992	Tower	Prague	50°4′51″N 14°27′4″E	
Chimney of Vřesová Power Station	206 m	1967	Chimney	Vřesová	50°15′20″N 12°41′45″E	
Chimney of Power Station of Škoda Auto works	200 m	1976	Chimney	Mladá Boleslav	50°25′2″N 14°55′59″E	
Chimney of Mělník Power Station II	200 m	1980	Chimney	Horní Počaply	50°24′52″N 14°24′47″E	demolished in 2015
Chimney of Ledvice Power Station	200 m	1969	Chimney	Ledvice	50°34′35″N 13°46′45″E	
Chimneys of Počerady Power Station	200 m	1974	Chimney	Počerady	50°25′40″N 13°40′36″E ; 50°25′36″N 13°40′43″E	2 chimneys
Large chimney of Neratovice Spolana Works	200 m	1976	Chimney	Neratovice	50°16′25″N 14°31′26″E	
Chimney of Prunéřov Power Station 1	200 m	1976	Chimney	Prunéřov	50°24′42″N 13°15′9″E	demolished in 2023
Chimney of Tušimice Power Station 1	196 m	1963–1964	Chimney	Tušimice		demolished on November 27, 2005
Transmitter Cukrák	195 m	1961	tower	Jíloviště	49°56′10″N 14°21′21″E	

== Timeline ==
Held record		Name and location	Completed	Pinnacle height (m)	Notes
From	To	Name and location	Completed	Pinnacle height (m)	Notes
2026	now	Vysílač Krašov, Bezvěrov	1981	347.5	
1976	2026	RKS Liblice 2, Liblice	1976	355	2 masts, demolished in 2026
1959	1976	Old mast of Transmitter Kojál, Krásensko	1959	312.5	dismantled in 1985
1936	1959	Blaw-Knox Tower Liblice, Liblice	1936	280.4	demolished in 1972
1931	1936	Old masts of Liblice transmitter, Liblice	1931	150	2 masts, demolished in 2004
1931	1931	Chimney of Kolín Power Plant, Kolín	1931	120	height reduced to 117 metres
1920	1931	Chimney of Piette Papermill, Plzeň	1920	105	height reduced to 95 metres in 1950s
1837	1920	Tower of Cathedral of St. Bartholomew, Plzeň	1837	102.3	newly roofed in 1837, after a thunderbolt in 1835 caused a fire, that destroyed old roof
1592	1837	Tower of Church of St. James, Brno	1592	92	
1492	1783	Tower of Tovačov Castle, Tovačov	1492	96	destroyed in 1783, rebuilt in 1886
1460s	1492	Towers of Church of Our Lady before Týn	1460s	81	

== See also ==
- List of tallest structures in Prague
- List of tallest buildings in the Czech Republic
