= Krasov (disambiguation) =

Krasov is a municipality and village in the Czech Republic. Krasov or Krašov may also refer to:

- Vysílač Krašov, a TV broadcasting facility in the Czech Republic
- Krasov (surname)
