= František Rambousek =

Czech entomologist

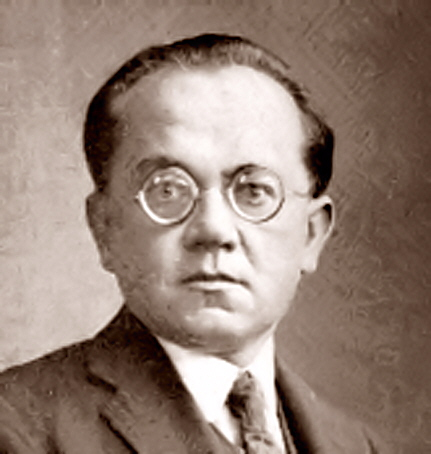
Rambousek in 1931

František Rambousek (1 April 1886 – 14 September 1931) was a Czech entomologist. He specialized in the insects of beet crops at the Institute for Beet Research at Ořechovka. After the formation of the First Czechoslovak Republic he became a member of the Revolutionary National Assembly for the Socialist Party.

== Biography ==
Rambousek was born in Liblice (today part of Český Brod), son of František Rambousek (1853–1937). After school he went to Charles University in Prague and studied under Vejdovsky. Even as a student he took an interest in beetles. In 1908 he went on a study tour to Bulgaria, supported in part by a donation of his entomological collections to the Imperial Station in Sofia. He collected insects, particularly beetles of the family Staphylinidae, from across Bulgaria. In 1909, he listed 335 species of Staphylinidae including 3 new species. In 1916, he became a head of the sugar research institute in Střešovice. During World War I, he joined the resistance and became a member of the Maffia. He served in the Revolutionary National Assembly from 1818 to 1919 representing the Socialist party. Because of his knowledge of foreign languages he was appointed to the peace delegation to Paris and Versailles in 1918. He then resigned from politics and returned to work for the sugar industry, researching beet insects.

In 1928, he spoke at the fourth international congress on beet pests and published a book on the insects of beets.
