= David Brunclík =

Czech footballer

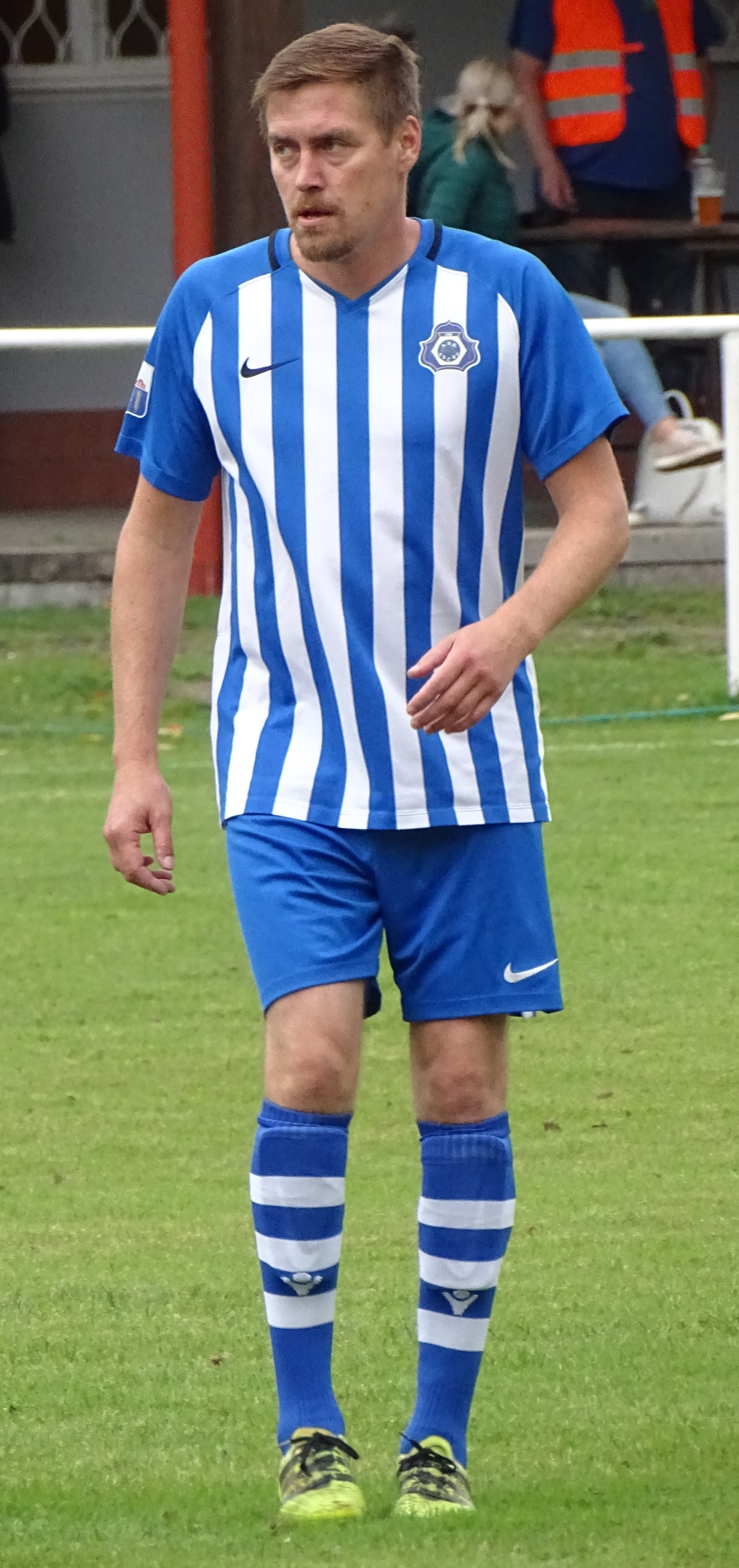

Personal information
- Full name: David Brunclík
- Date of birth: 17 April 1985 (age 41)
- Place of birth: Český Brod, Czechoslovakia
- Height: 1.75 m (5 ft 9 in)
- Position: Midfielder

Team information
- Current team: FK Kratonohy

Youth career
- 1995–2003: FK Mladá Boleslav

Senior career*
Years	Team	Apps	(Gls)
2003–2015	FK Mladá Boleslav	62	(3)
2006	→ Chmel Blšany (loan)	8	(1)
2008	→ SK Kladno (loan)	11	(0)
2008–2009	→ Zenit Čáslav (loan)	15	(0)
2011–2012	→ FK Ústí nad Labem (loan)	15	(4)
2014–2015	→ Dynamo České Budějovice (loan)	28	(2)
2015–2017	Kolín		
2017–	FK Kratonohy		

International career
2000	Czech Republic U15	4	(0)
2006–2007	Czech Republic U21	3	(0)
- * Club domestic league appearances and goals as of 28 November 2014

David Brunclík (born 17 April 1985) is a Czech professional footballer who currently plays for FK Kratonohy. Brunclík has played international football at under-21 level for Czech Republic U21.
