= RKS =

RKS may refer to:

- Designation for transmission facilities in Czech, for example RKS Liblice 1
- Kosovo, Republic of Kosovo, license plate code
- Rainbow Kitten Surprise, an American alternative rock band
  - RKS, their second studio album released in 2015
- Remote keyless system
- Rock Springs - Sweetwater County Airport
- Rotterdamse Kunststichting (RKS)
