= Kojál radio transmitter =

- Vysílač Kojál
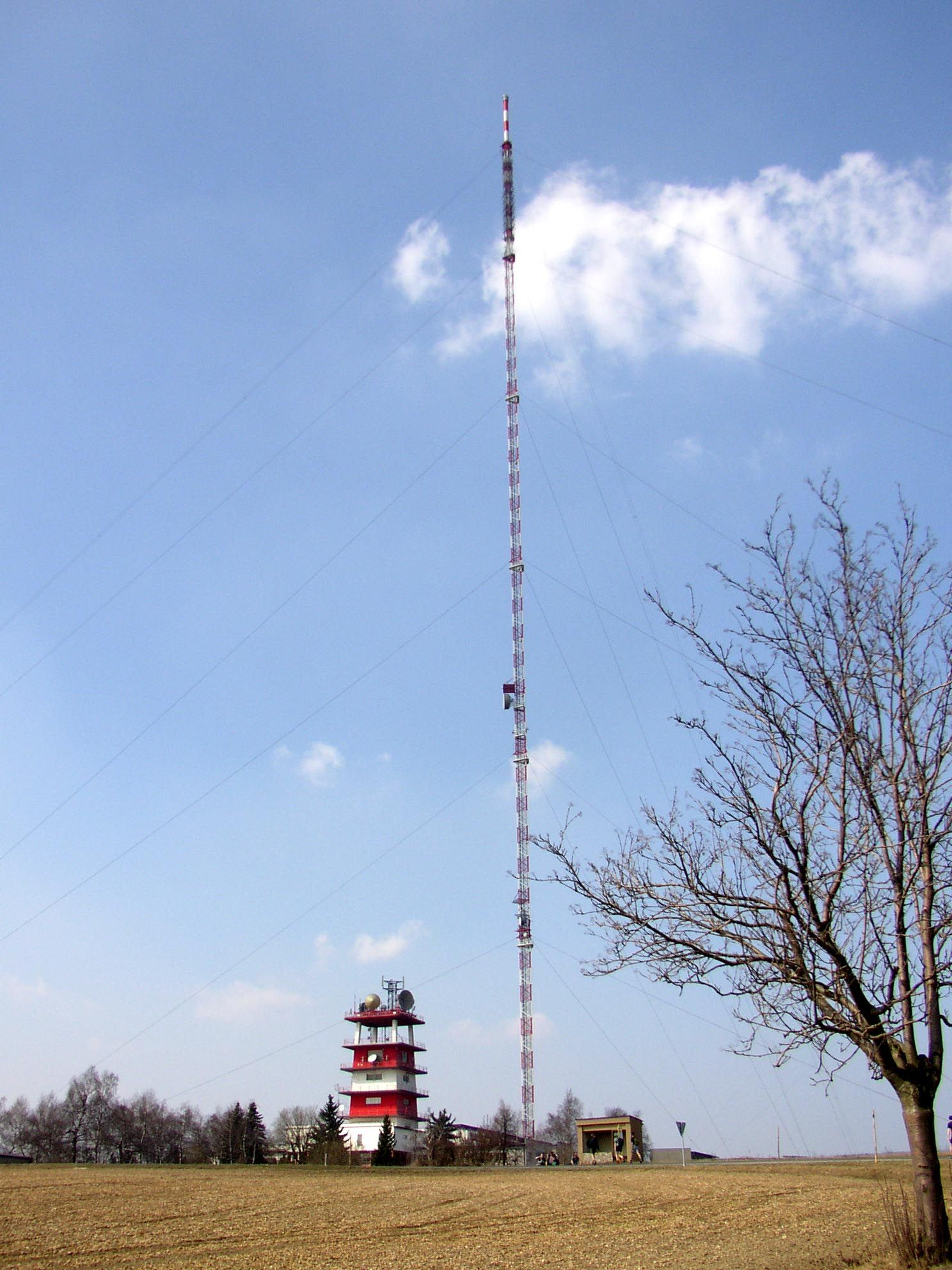

General information
- Location: Vyškov District, South Moravian Region, Czech Republic
- Coordinates: 49°22′12″N 16°48′58″E
- Completed: 1958

The Transmitter Kojál, also known as Morava transmitter, (Czech: Vysílač Kojál) is a facility for FM and TV transmission at Kojál Hill near Brno in the Czech Republic. Its aerial mast is a 340-metre-high guyed mast. Mast is second tallest structure in the Czech Republic.

The mast was built as replacement of the 324-metre-tall (1,063 ft) guyed mast, built of lattice steel in 1959/60. This mast, which had a triangular cross section, was anchored in 4 levels, which were situated 63.75 metres, 135 metres, 213.75 metres and 292.5 metres above ground. In a height of 300 metres, it had a cabin with rooms for measurements. On this there was the antenna mast with antennas for FM (lower part) and TV (upper part) broadcasting.

== See also ==
- List of masts
