= Vysílač Krašov =

Czech TV broadcasting facility

Coordinates: 49°59′44″N 13°04′46″E

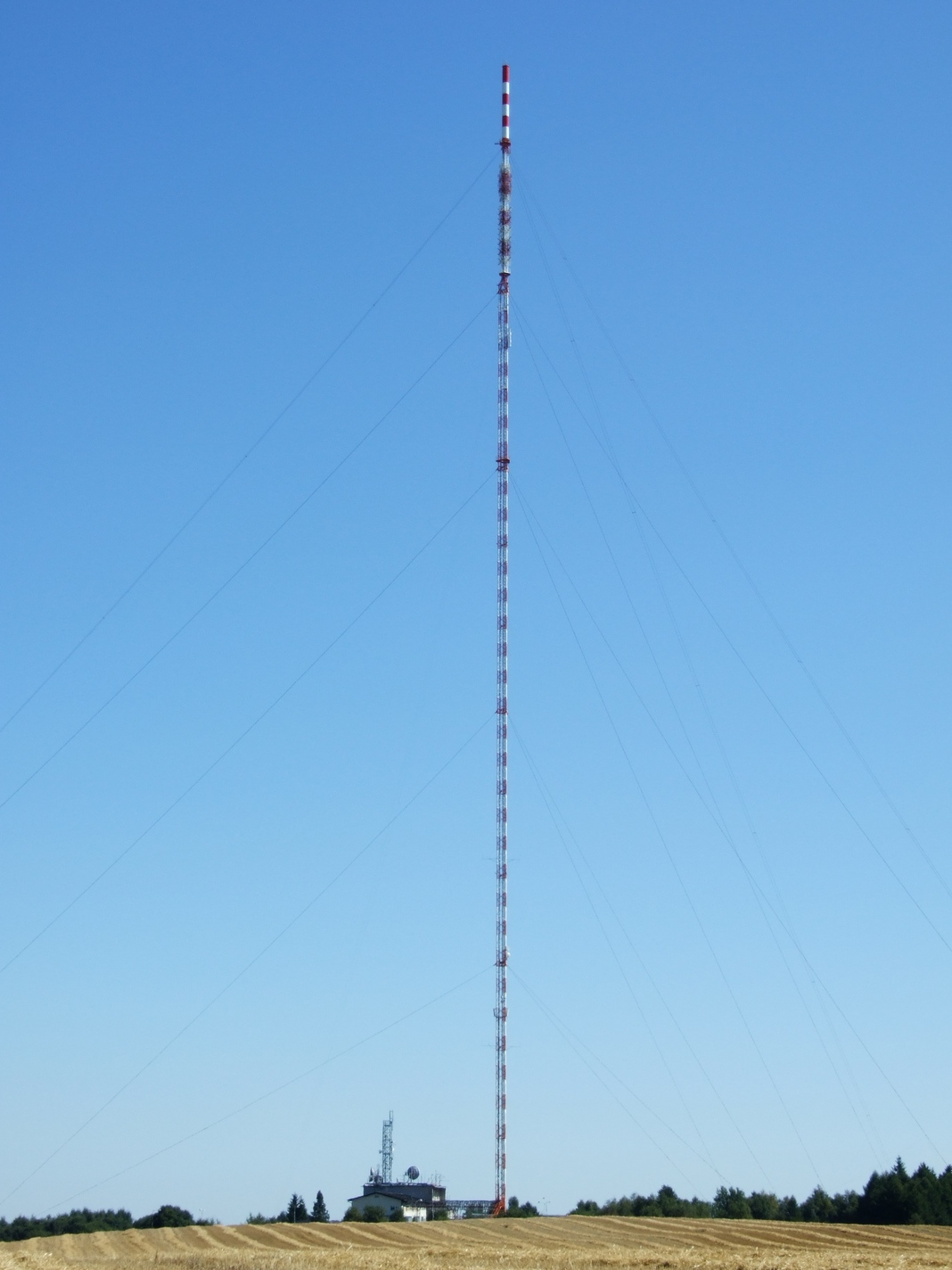
Close-up view

Krašov Transmitter (Czech: Vysílač Krašov) is a facility for TV-broadcasting in Bezvěrov in the Karlovy Vary Region of the Czech Republic. It has a 347.5 metres (1,140 ft) tall guyed mast (former mast was 305 m tall).

== Description ==
The old mast, which had a triangular cross section, was anchored in 4 levels, which were situated 60 metres, 127.5 metres, 206.25 metres and 285 metres above ground. At this height there was also a cabin with rooms for measurements. On this there was in a height of 290.62 metres the antenna mast for TV broadcasting.

The new mast was built 1979 and 1981 after the old mast partially collapsed in 1979 (the rest was demolished using explosives), because of strong freezing temperatures and damage received on 25 August 1968 during the 1968 Warsaw Pact intervention. The mast is the tallest structure in the Czech Republic.

== See also ==
- List of masts
- List of tallest structures in the Czech Republic

== Source of data fold old mast ==
- Turmbauwerke, Bauverlag GmbH, Wiesbaden (Deutschland), 1966
