= Buková hora TV Tower =

- Vysílač Buková hora
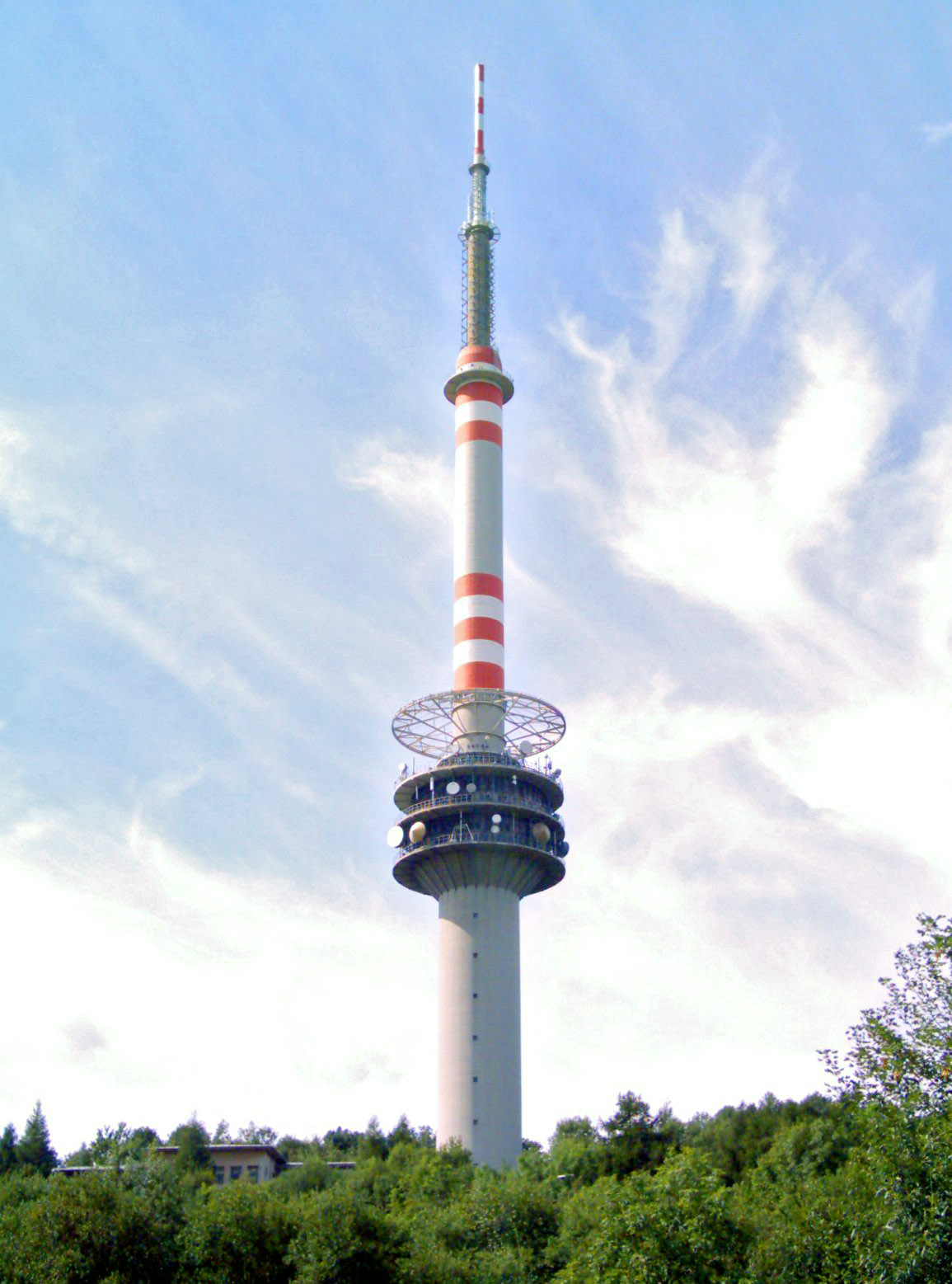
- Interactive map of the Buková hora TV Tower area

General information
- Location: Děčín District, Ústí nad Labem Region, Czech Republic
- Coordinates: 50°40′19″N 14°13′44″E
- Completed: 1967

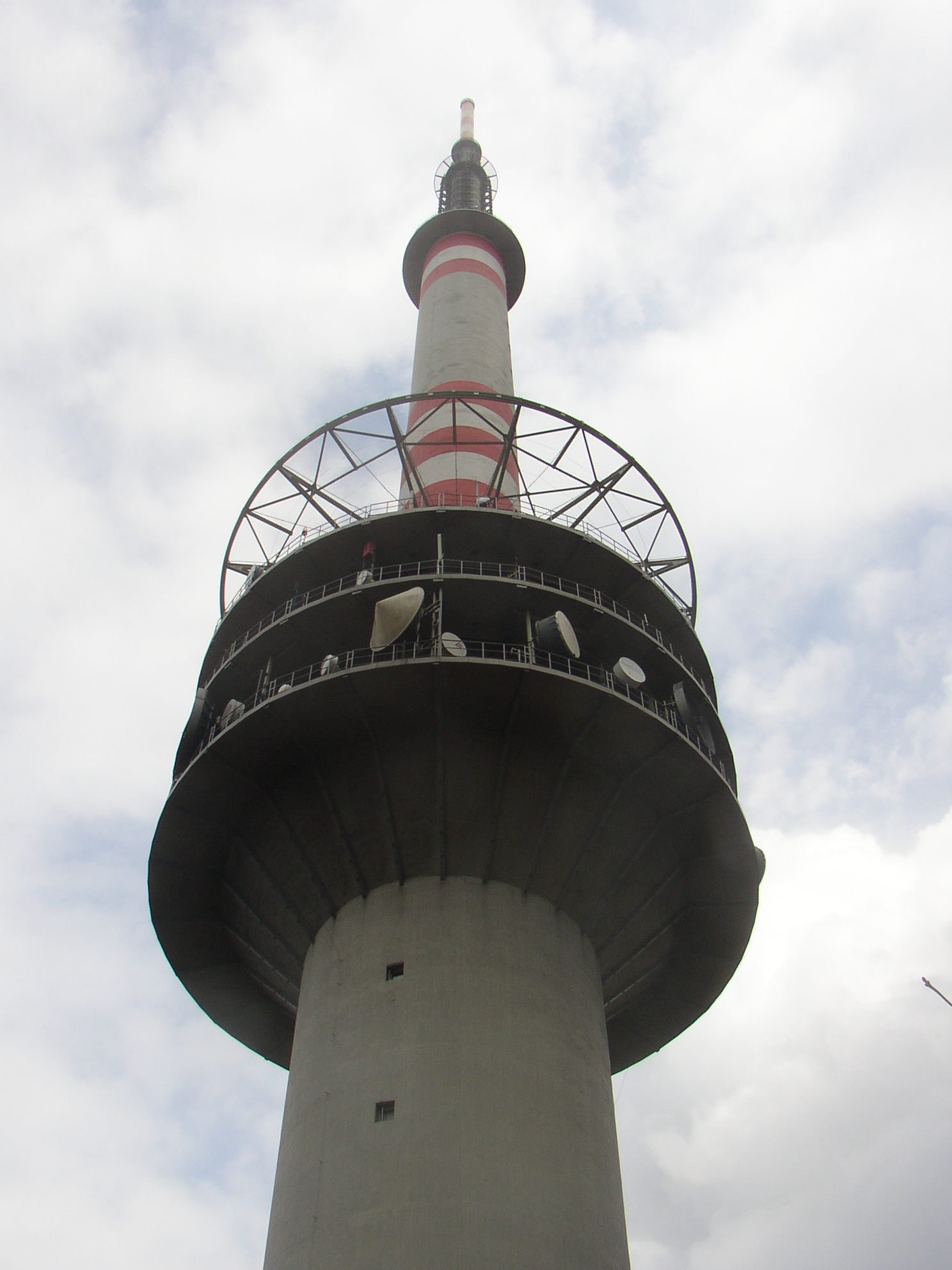
Close up of the tower

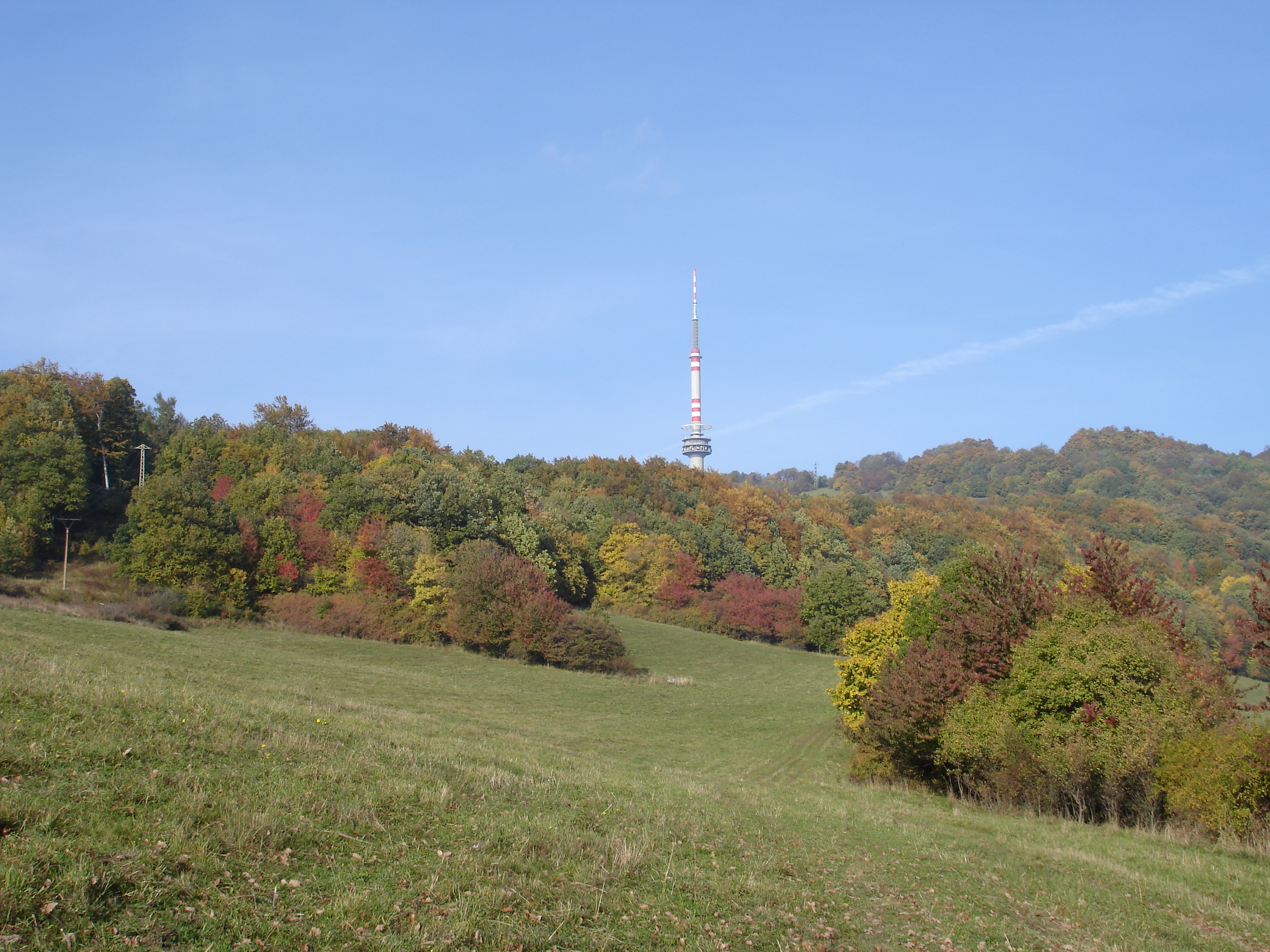
Wiew from a south side

Buková hora TV Tower (Czech: Vysílač Buková hora) is the tallest free-standing transmission tower in Czech Republic (some chimneys and some guyed masts in Czech Republic are taller). It is a 223 metres tall concrete tower situated on Buková hora in North Bohemia and is the facility of the transmitter North Bohemia.

Buková hora TV Tower, which is not accessible for tourists, was built in 1967. Previous TV tower, which was built there between 1960 and 1962, had to be demolished few years later, because of fire inside that. It was originally 181.5 metres tall.

The name of the mountain might come from the name of bukač bird (Botaurinae), which is common in the area.

== See also ==
- List of towers
- List of tallest structures in the Czech Republic
