= Chvaletice Power Station =

Power station in Czechia

Coordinates: 50°01′43″N 15°27′10″E

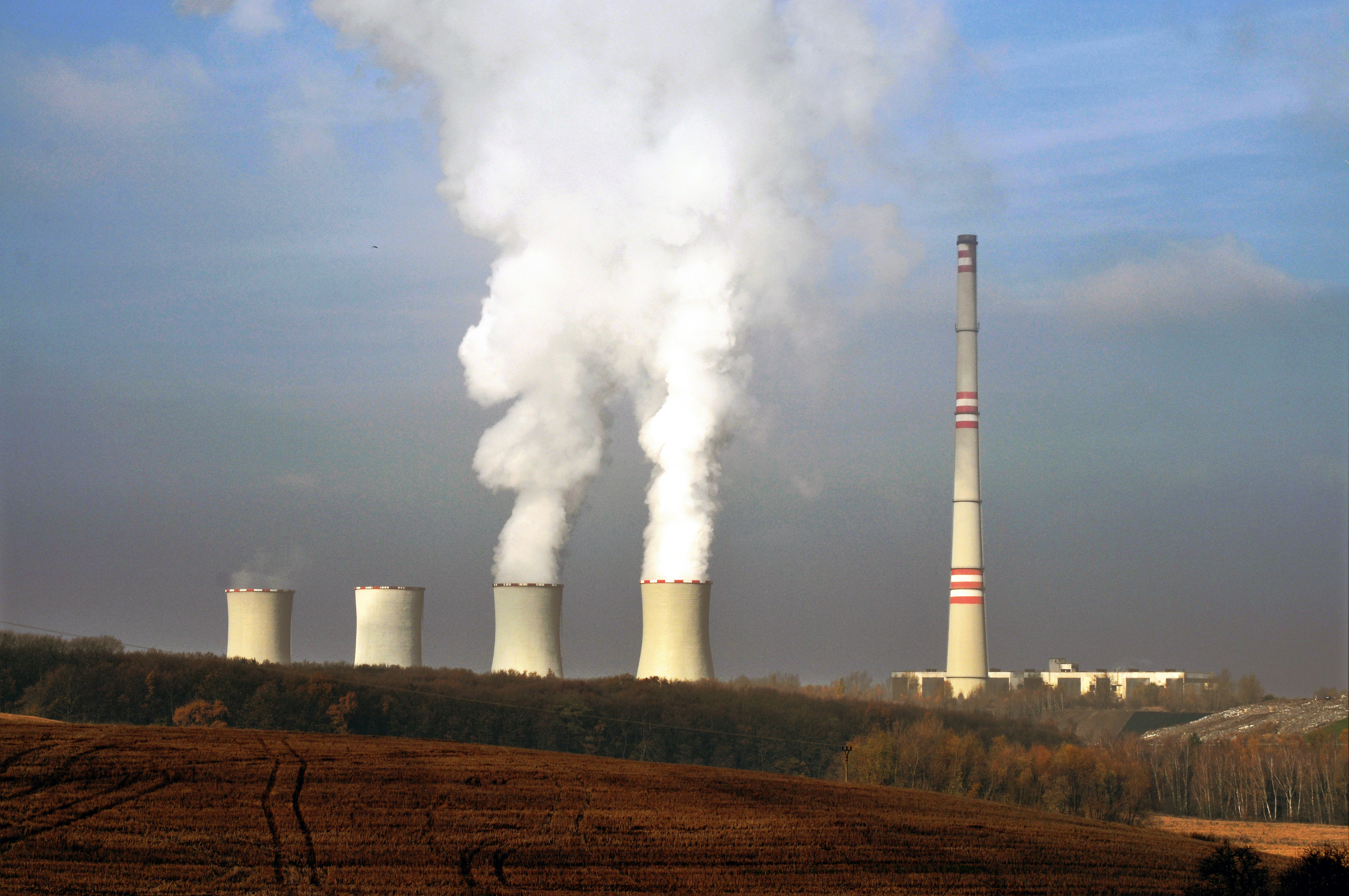
Chvaletice Power Plant

Chvaletice Power Station (Czech: Elektrárna Chvaletice) is a large lignite-fired power station at Chvaletice in the Czech Republic, owned by Pavel Tykač. Its installed power output is 4 × 205 MW, in total 820 MW. Blocks 3 and 4 use a chimney which is 305 metres tall, built in 1977, that used to be the tallest free-standing structure in the Czech Republic, in 2025 it's on the 6th place.

== See also ==
- List of tallest structures in the Czech Republic
