= RKS Liblice 2 =

Medium-wave broadcasting station

Coordinates: 50°04′02″N 14°53′13″E

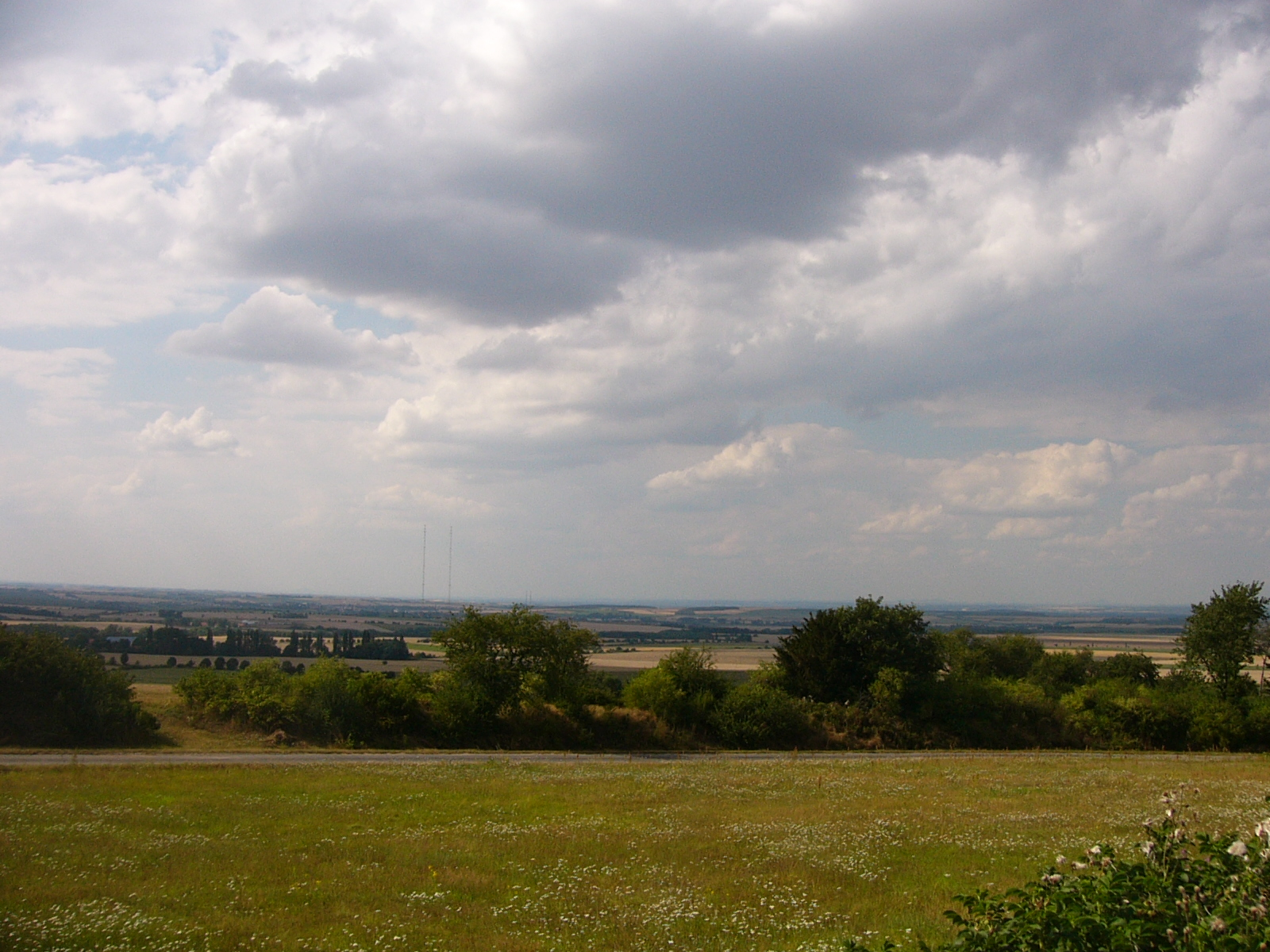
Masts of RKS Liblice 2 as viewed from a distance.

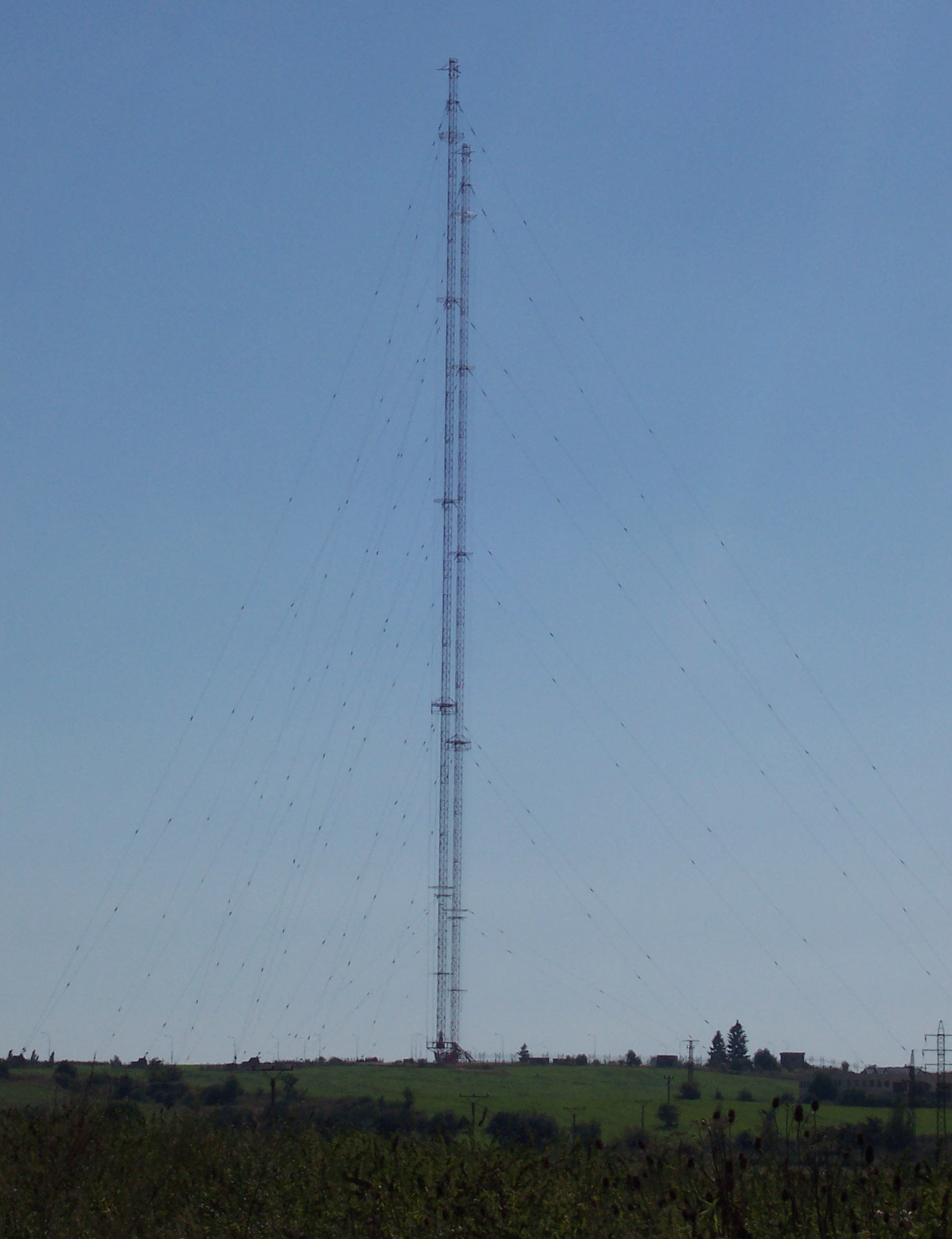
Close-up view of the masts of the towers.

RKS Liblice 2 (also known as Liblice B) was a medium-wave broadcasting station located east of Prague near Liblice, close to the former RKS Liblice 1. Its two 355 m (1,165 ft) tall guyed masts were the tallest structures in the Czech Republic for almost 50 years, until they were demolished on 15 October 2026. These lattice steel towers were built 120 m (390 ft) apart from each other, forming a slightly directional radiation pattern directed towards the Spanish Madrid transmitter on the same frequency. The masts carried special anti-fading cage aerials. Designed by Jan Šťovíček, these supertall towers were the tallest towers in the world used for broadcasting in the medium-wave range. RKS Liblice 2 was built in 1975–1976 and entered service in December 1976. It broadcast on 639 kHz until 31 March 2025, with a period of inactivity from January 2022 to September 2023. During construction, two new transmitter devices of the type Tesla SRV 750 with an output power of 750 kW were installed. At first, these transmitters were switched in parallel for a transmission power of 1500 kW; in 2012 the power was halved to 750 kW. From 2023 to 2025, the station broadcast with only 20 kW of power, a significant reduction. The old transmitter devices were replaced with a semiconductor TRAM transmitter.

== History ==
Before the current masts were built, the site was occupied by a 280.4 m (919.9 ft) tall Blaw-Knox mast, built in 1936–1937 by Karlova Huť, which survived World War II without damage. It was demolished with explosives in 1972 to make way for the new masts. The two 150 m (492 ft) towers of the neighbouring RKS Liblice 1 stood until 11 August 2004, when they were also demolished with explosives.

=== Events ===
- On 23 November 1978, the transmission frequency, which had been 638 kHz since 1950, was changed to 639 kHz in order to comply with the Geneva Frequency Plan.
- On 27 August 2005, a skydiver jumped off one of the masts after gaining illegal access to it while the transmitter was shut down for repairs. His parachute became accidentally hooked to a backstage insulator and he needed to be rescued by helicopter.
- Czech Radio ended its medium-wave broadcasts of the Dvojka (Programme 2) station from Liblice at midnight on 31 December 2021.
- On 27 September 2023, the private station Country Radio began broadcasting from Liblice on 639 kHz, replacing its old transmitter at RKS Zbraslav on 1062 kHz. However, it operated at a greatly reduced power of only 20 kW. Country Radio ended its broadcasts from Liblice on 31 March 2025, after which the masts had no further use.
- After an unsuccessful attempt to sell the masts, their owner, České Radiokomunikace, decided to demolish them, as the necessary repairs were estimated to cost at least 170 million CZK.
- On 15 October 2026, at about 11:15 local time, both masts were brought down simultaneously by explosive charges that cut their guy wires. The Krašov transmitter then became the tallest structure in the Czech Republic.

== See also ==
- List of masts
- List of tallest structures in Czechia
- List of twin buildings and structures
