= Jan Bočan =

Czech architect and university educator (1937–2010)

- Born: 17 October 1937; Český Brod, Czechoslovakia
- Died: 7 December 2010 (aged 73); Prague, Czech Republic
- Education: Czech Technical University
- Occupations: educator, architect, urban planner, university teacher and designer
- Children: Mahulena Bočanová

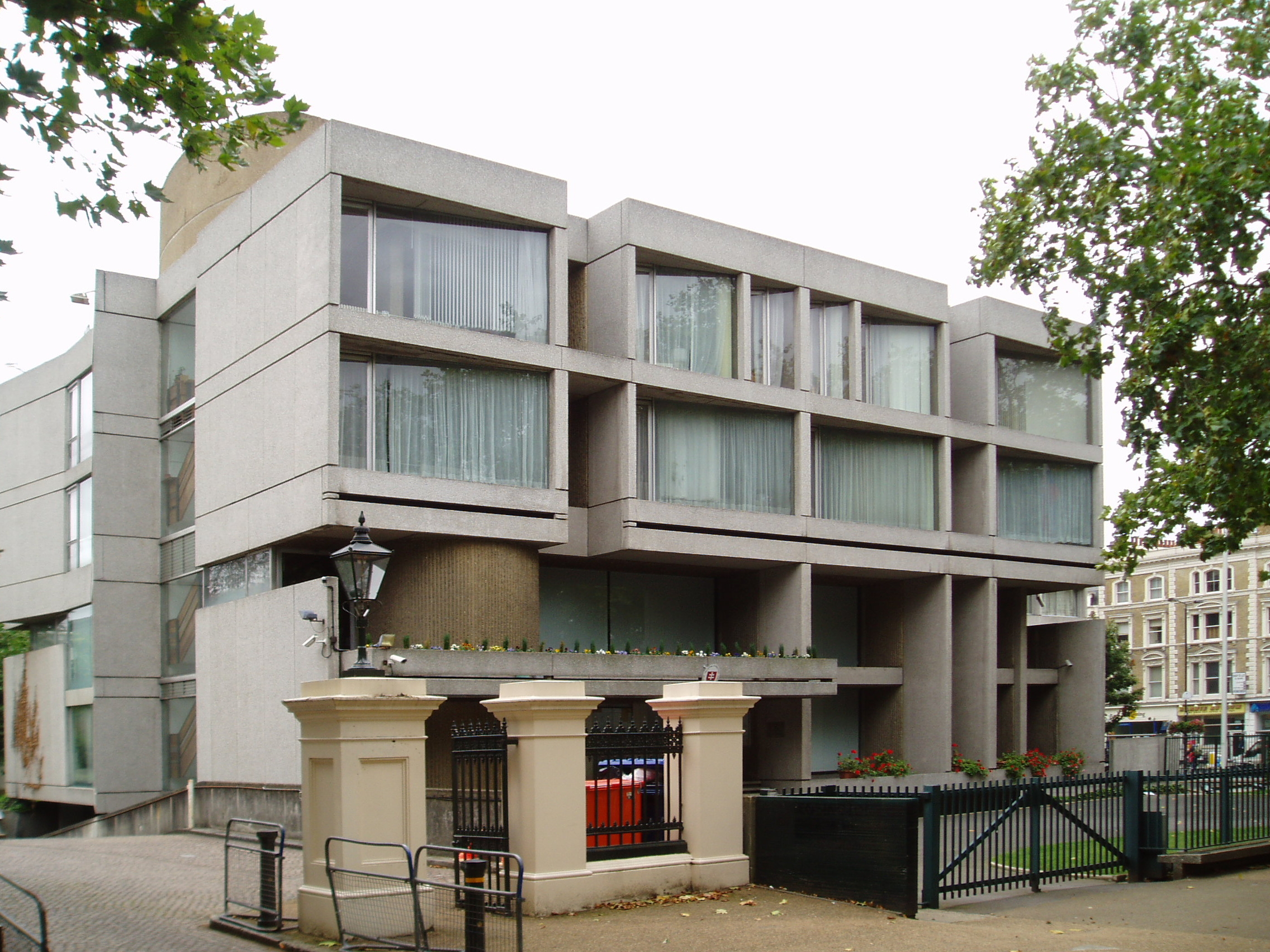
Сzechoslovak embassy in London, which won the Royal Institute of British Architects (RIBA) Award in 1971

Jan Bočan (17 October 1937 – 7 December 2010) was a Czech architect, university educator, urban planner and designer.

== Biography ==
Bočan was born of 17 October 1937 in Český Brod. In 1962, he graduated from the Faculty of Architecture of the Czech Technical University in Prague, where he returned in 1990 as the head of his studio. On 2 May 2006, he was appointed professor by the President of the Republic.

Among other things, he is the co-author of the new building of the Praha hlavní nádraží (Prague Central Station), Fairmont Golden Prague Hotel, the Prague housing estate Velká Ohrada and several embassy buildings (e.g. the embassies in London, Brasília and Tbilisi).

In 1971, he and a team of co-authors were awarded the RIBA Award for the best design of the year in London for the Сzechoslovak embassy (today Slovak embassy). The design of the Embassy in Tbilisi was awarded by the Union of Architects and the Ministry of Construction of Georgia in 2005. In 2009, he was awarded the Grand Prix of Architects for his lifetime achievement by the Czech Association of Architects.

He died on 7 December 2010, at the age of 73.

His daughter is actress Mahulena Bočanová.

== Selected works ==
- Recreational cottage at Slapy, 1962, author: Bočan
- Czechoslovak Embassy in London, 1971, authors: Šrámek, Bočan Štěpánský
- Czechoslovak Embassy in Stockholm, 1972, authors: Bočan, Rothbauer, Šrámek
- Czechoslovak Embassy in Brazil, 1973, authors: Filsak, Šrámek, Bočan
- Prague Central Station, 1973, authors: Bočan, Danda, Šrámková, Šrámek
- Hotel Intercontinentál in Prague (Fairmont Golden Prague Hotel), 1974, authors: Bočan, Šrámek, Rothbauer, Hřivnáč, Novotný
- Family semi-detached villa in Prague-Baba, 1977, author: Bočan
- The Velká Ohrada housing estate in the South-Western Town in Prague, construction began in 1978, author: Bočan, Rothbauer
- Above-standard housing in Prague-Trója, start of implementation 1989, author: Bočan
- Multifunctional house in Kouřim, 1998, authors: Bočan, Škarda
- Czech Embassy in Tbilisi, 2005, authors: Bočan, Koňata, Tomášek, Braum, Strach, Hilský, Seidl, Císler
