= OMA (time signal) =

Time signal radio station in Czech Republic

Coordinates: 50.0728°N 14.8797°E

OMA was the callsign of a Czech time signal station. The station was operated by the Astronomical Institute of Prague and the transmitters were located at RKS Liblice 1.

The station transmitted in the LF band on 50 kHz with a power of 7 kW and in the HF band on 2500 kHz with 1 kW. A reserve LF transmitter was located at Poděbrady.

OMA, which could be also used for synchronizing radio controlled clocks, was shut down in 1995.

OMA time signal transmitter was used to synchronize radio clock. The transmit time protocol was changed multiple times. Periodic service maintenance outages lasted for days. The decoding was done in discrete hardware. Commercial use of OMA time signal was limited by absence of highly integrated receiver and decoding chip.

OMA was synchronized by Cesium Reference clock run by CSAV Czech Academy of Sciences, Kobylisy, Prague. Limited series of secondary 5MHz references with thermostat were manufactured by the institute. The secondary reference employed single transistor crystal oscillator with XF filter. The institute was under keen eye of communist party, dictating the R&D direction. They had there their devoted people. TV broadcasting and high reliability services were synchronized from the Cesium Reference. Today (2020) there are calls to resurrect the transmitter for resilience case. Performance of WWV beacon confirms the importance.
