= Krasov (surname) =

Krasov (masculine, Russian: Красов) or Krasova (feminine) is the surname of the following people:

- Andrei Krasov (born 1967), Russian military pilot
- Kateryna Krasova, Ukrainian road cyclist
- Marta Krásová (1901–1970), Czech operatic mezzo-soprano
- Vera Krasova (born 1987), Russian model
