= Krásensko =

- Municipality
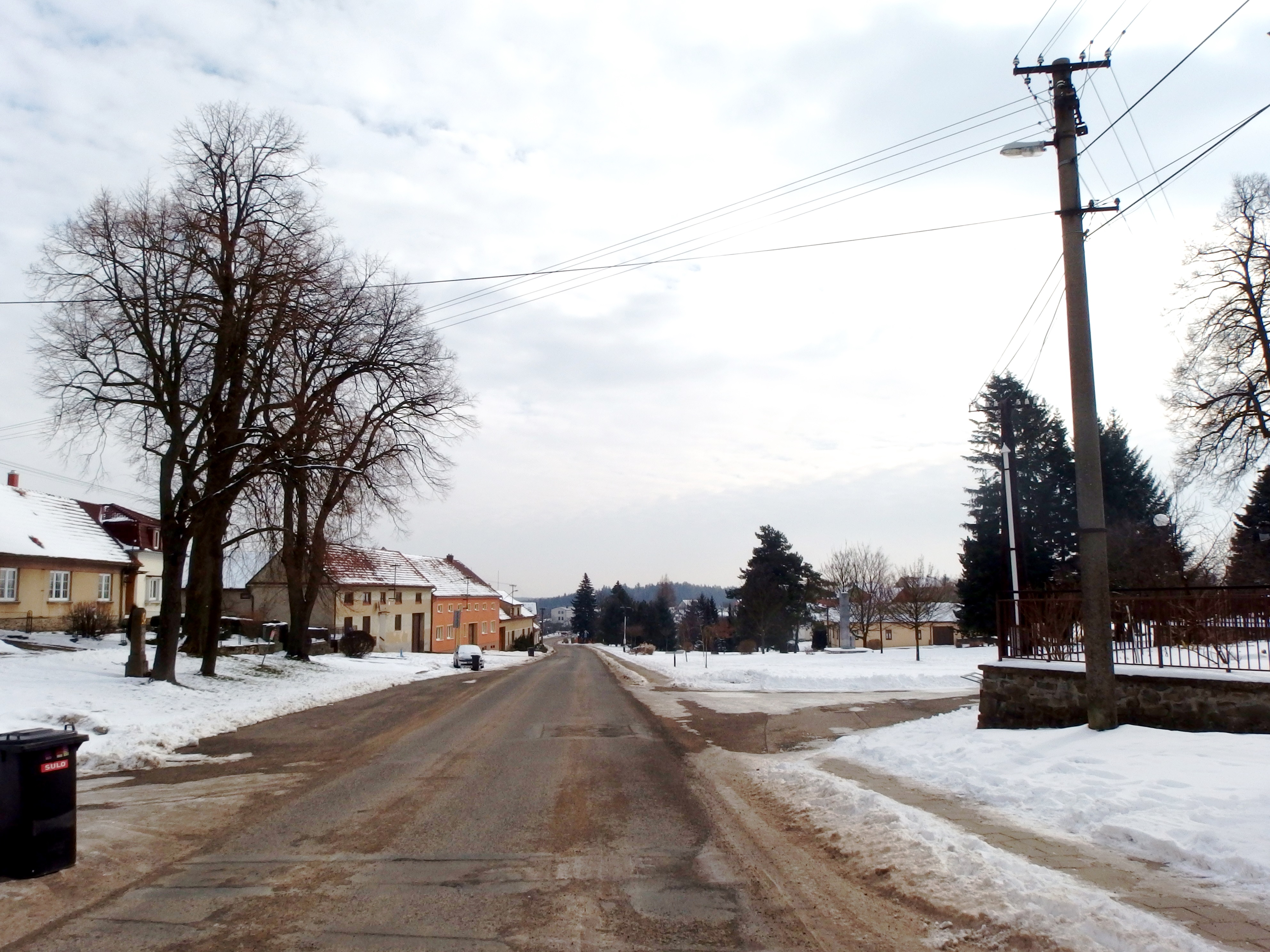
- Centre of Krásensko

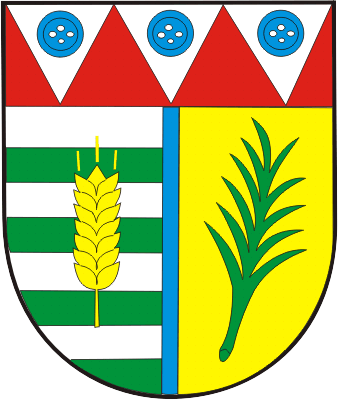
- Flag Coat of arms

- Location in the Czech Republic
- Coordinates: 49°21′52″N 16°49′48″E
- Country: Czech Republic
- Region: South Moravian
- District: Vyškov
- First mentioned: 1348

Area
  - Total: 7.26 km^{2} (2.80 sq mi)
- Elevation: 552 m (1,811 ft)

Population (2026-01-01)
  - Total: 410
  - Density: 56/km^{2} (150/sq mi)
- Time zone: UTC+1 (CET)
  - Summer (DST): UTC+2 (CEST)
- Postal code: 683 04
- Website: www.krasensko.cz

Krásensko is a municipality and village in Vyškov District in the South Moravian Region of the Czech Republic. It has about 400 inhabitants.

Krásensko lies approximately 15 kilometres (9 mi) north-west of Vyškov, 26 km (16 mi) north-east of Brno, and 193 km (120 mi) south-east of Prague.

== Demographics ==
Historical population
| Year | Pop. | ±% |
|---|---|---|
| 1869 | 780 | — |
| 1880 | 793 | +1.7% |
| 1890 | 802 | +1.1% |
| 1900 | 858 | +7.0% |
| 1910 | 851 | −0.8% |
| 1921 | 810 | −4.8% |
| 1930 | 691 | −14.7% |
| 1950 | 344 | −50.2% |
| 1961 | 422 | +22.7% |
| 1970 | 409 | −3.1% |
| 1980 | 446 | +9.0% |
| 1991 | 423 | −5.2% |
| 2001 | 437 | +3.3% |
| 2011 | 410 | −6.2% |
| 2021 | 383 | −6.6% |
Source: Censuses
