= Český Brod =

Town in the Czech Republic

- Town
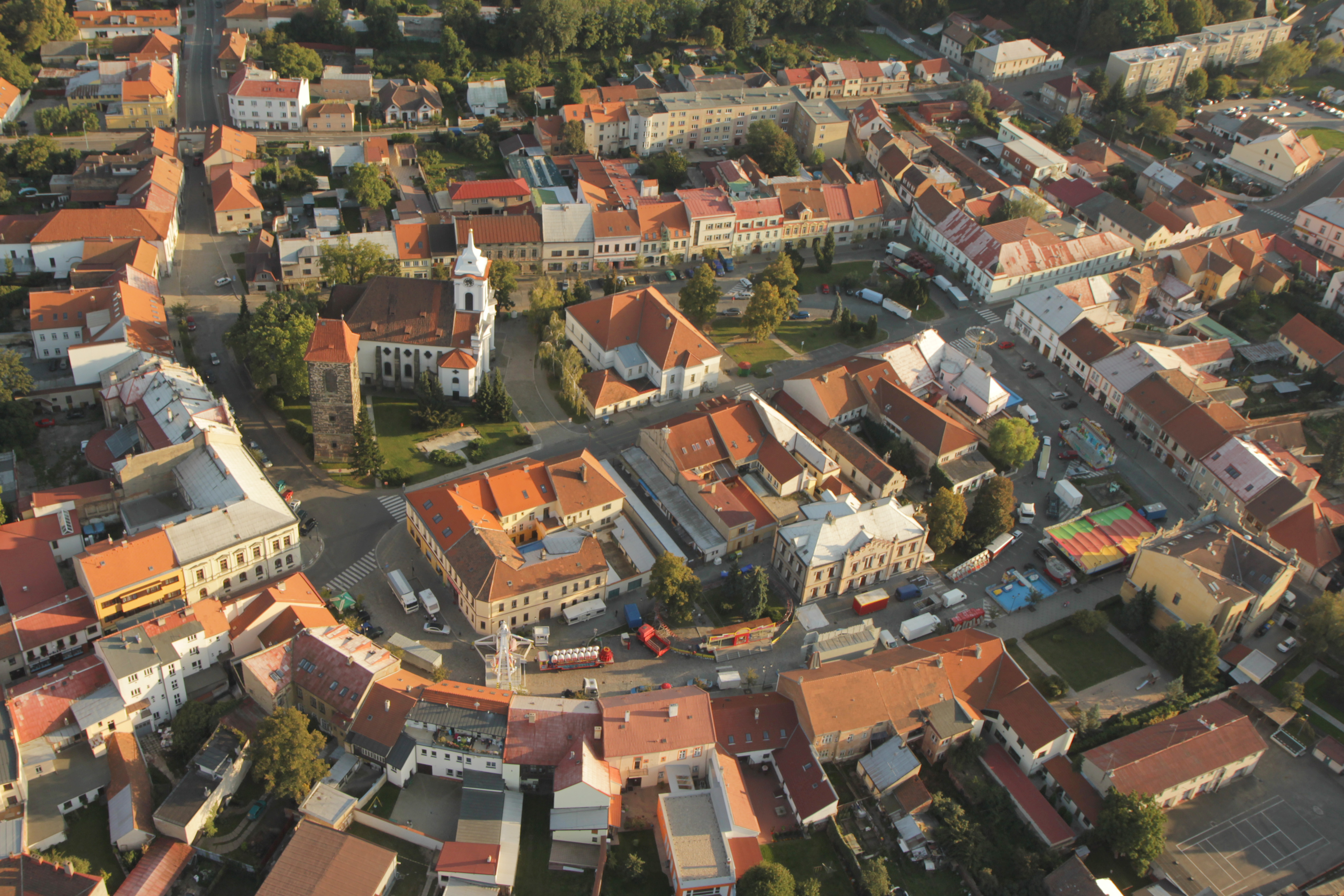
- Historic centre of the town

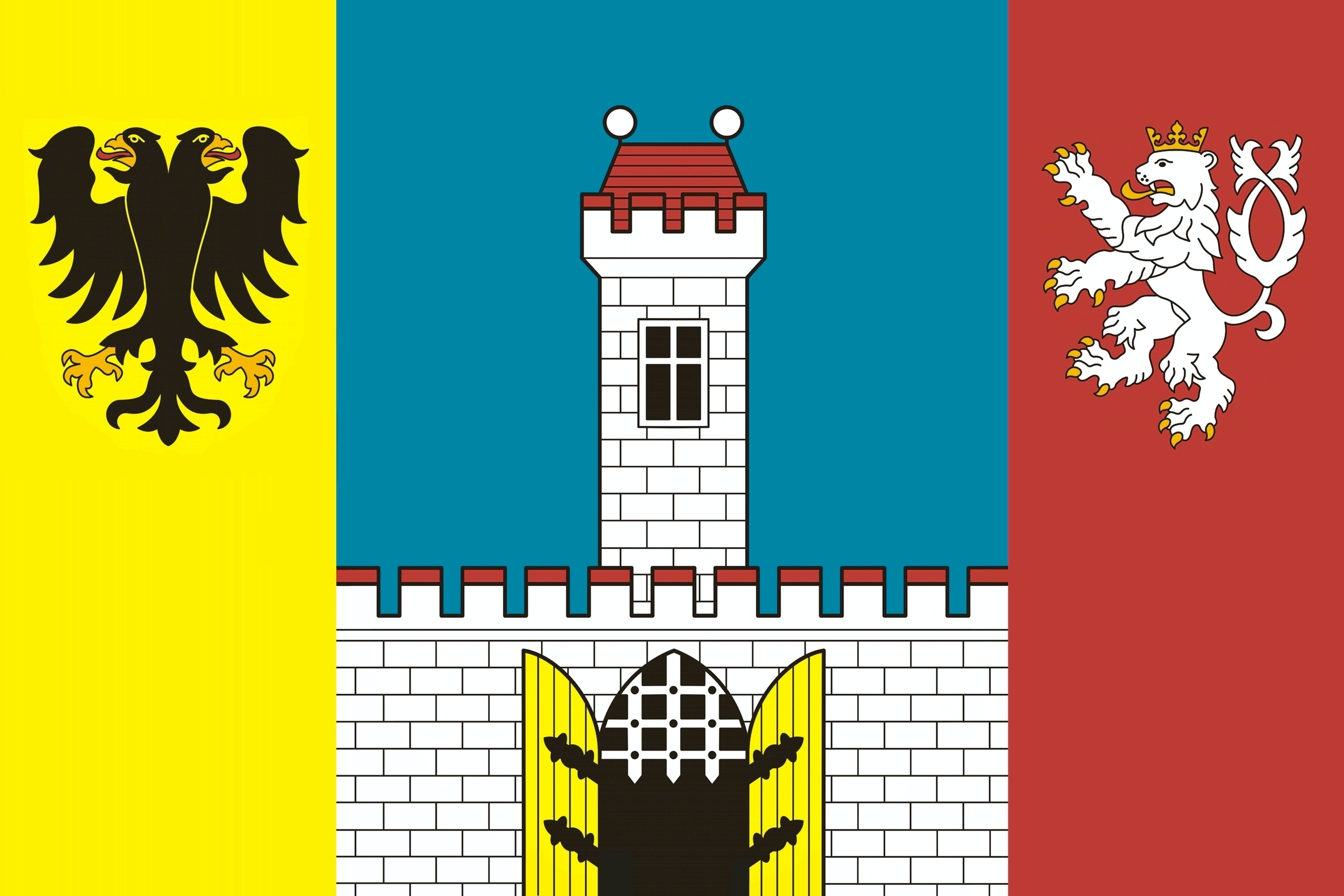
- Flag Coat of arms

- Location in the Czech Republic
- Coordinates: 50°4′26″N 14°51′29″E
- Country: Czech Republic
- Region: Central Bohemian
- District: Kolín
- First mentioned: 1268

Government
  - Mayor: Tomáš Klinecký (TOP 09)

Area
  - Total: 19.70 km^{2} (7.61 sq mi)
- Elevation: 219 m (719 ft)

Population (2026-01-01)
  - Total: 7,355
  - Density: 373.4/km^{2} (967.0/sq mi)
- Time zone: UTC+1 (CET)
  - Summer (DST): UTC+2 (CEST)
- Postal code: 282 01
- Website: www.cesbrod.cz

Český Brod (Czech pronunciation: [ˈtʃɛskiː ˈbrot]; German: Böhmisch Brod) is a town in Kolín District in the Central Bohemian Region of the Czech Republic. It has about 7,400 inhabitants. The town is located on the Šembera Stream in the Central Elbe Table.

Český Brod was founded in the 12th century. The historic town centre is well preserved and is protected as an urban monument zone.

== Administrative division ==
Český Brod consists of three municipal parts (in brackets population according to the 2021 census):

- Český Brod (6,082)
- Liblice (899)
- Štolmíř (280)

== Etymology ==
The word brod means 'ford' in Czech and refers to a ford across the stream Šembera that used to be here. The town was originally called Biskupský Brod (in Latin Broda Episcopalis, meaning "Bishop's ford"). From 1315, the name Český Brod ('Bohemian ford') was used to distinguish from Německý Brod ('German Brod', today Havlíčkův Brod), which was located on the same trade route.

== Geography ==
Český Brod is located about 23 kilometres (14 mi) east of Prague. It lies in a flat agricultural landscape in the Central Elbe Table. The highest point is at 275 m (902 ft) above sea level. The Šembera Stream flows through the town.

== History ==
Český Brod was probably founded by the bishop of Prague Jan I between 1134 and 1139 and was located on an important trade route. The first written mention of Český Brod is from 1268, when it was promoted to a town by Bishop Jan III of Dražice. From that time till the beginning of the 14th century, the town's name was Biskupský Brod. In 1437, Emperor Sigismund designated Český Brod a free royal town.

In 1512, the town was damaged by a large fire. After Český Brod participated in 1547 Bohemian Estates Revolt, its properties were confiscated and the town became significantly poorer. During the Thirty Years' War, in 1639 and 1643, the town was badly damaged and looted. At the end of the war, the town was abandoned, but then 24 new families settled here.

The railway was constructed in 1845, which triggered the industrial development of the town. A steam mill, a brewery and a farm machinery factory were established here.

A large medium wave broadcasting facility was partly located in Liblice part of Český Brod. It was built in 1975–1976. Until its demolition in 2026, it was the largest structure in the Czech Republic with a height of 355 metres (1,165 ft).

== Demographics ==
Historical population

Year	Pop.	±%
1869	3,722	—
1880	4,472	+20.2%
1890	4,758	+6.4%
1900	5,069	+6.5%
1910	5,568	+9.8%

Year	Pop.	±%
1921	5,463	−1.9%
1930	6,807	+24.6%
1950	6,884	+1.1%
1961	6,885	+0.0%
1970	6,642	−3.5%

Year	Pop.	±%
1980	6,893	+3.8%
1991	7,031	+2.0%
2001	6,670	−5.1%
2011	6,915	+3.7%
2021	7,261	+5.0%

Source: Censuses

== Transport ==
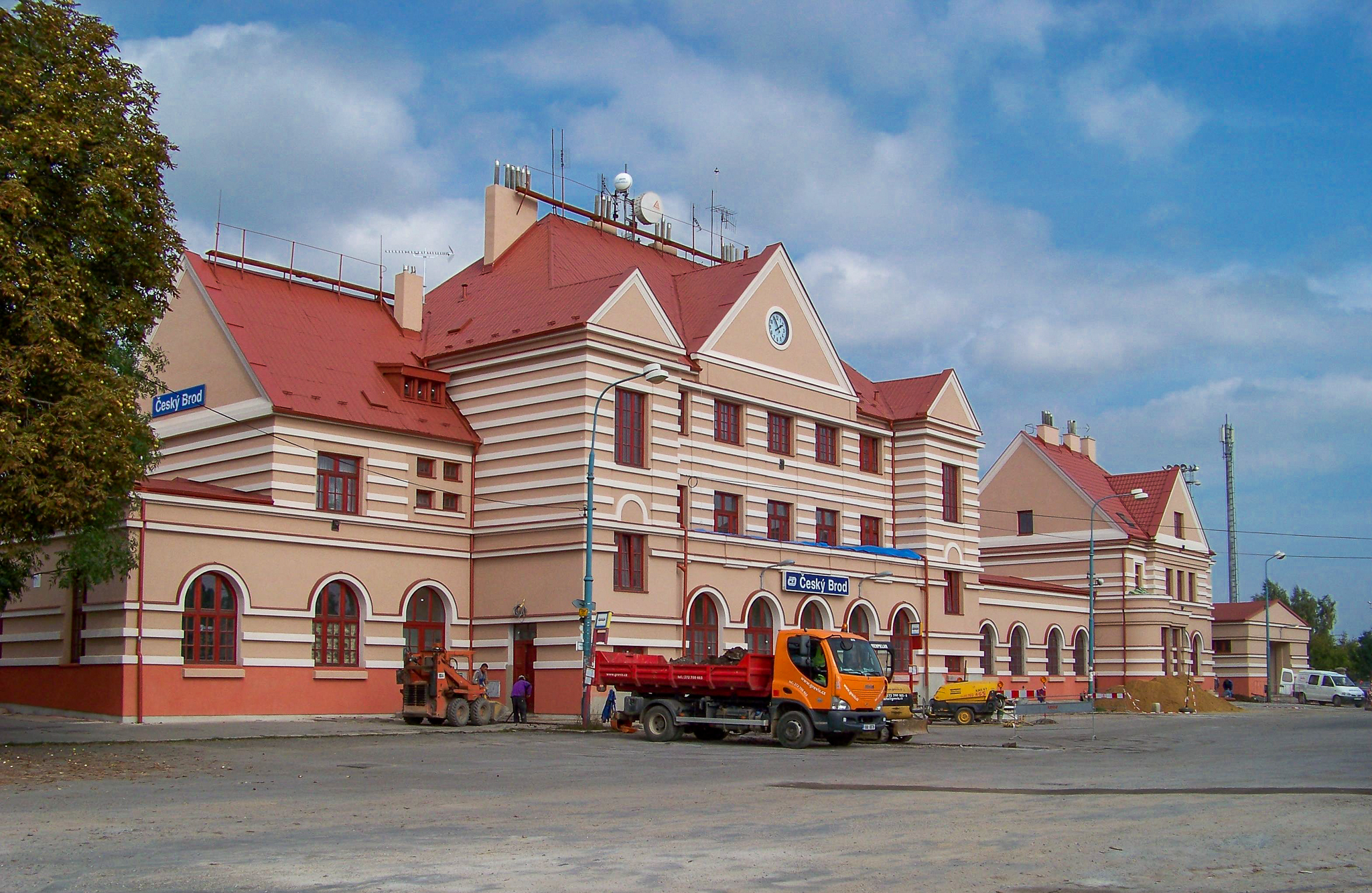
Train station

The I/12 from Prague to Kolín runs through the town.

Český Brod is located on the railway line from Prague–Kolín.

== Education ==
In Český Brod are three kindergartens, two primary schools, a school for students with special needs, a gymnasium, and the Secondary School of Management and Graphics in Liblice.

== Culture ==
Rock for People, an annual summer music festival, was held in Český Brod from 1995 to 2006. In 2007, the festival relocated to Hradec Králové.

== Sights ==
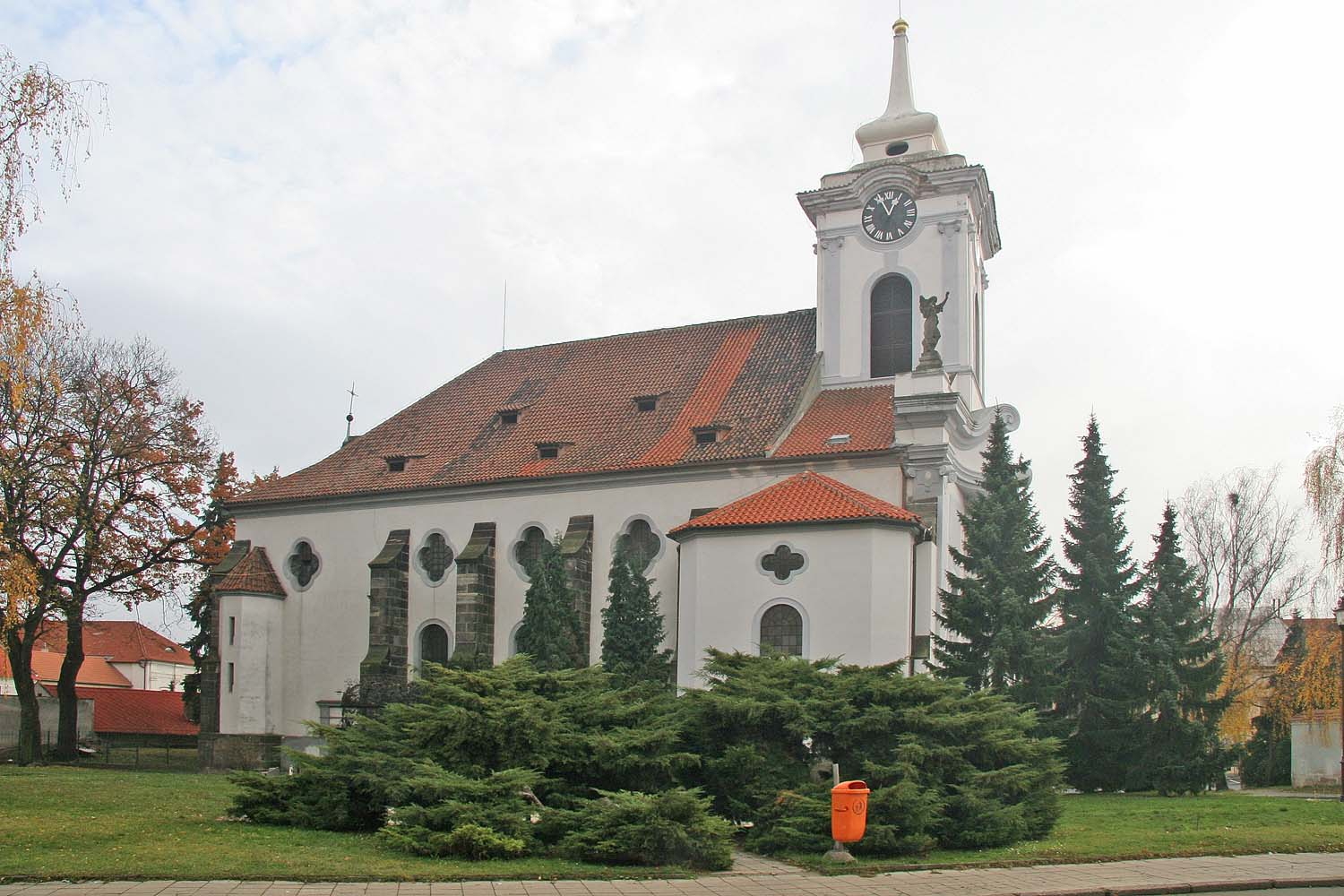
Church of Saint Gotthard

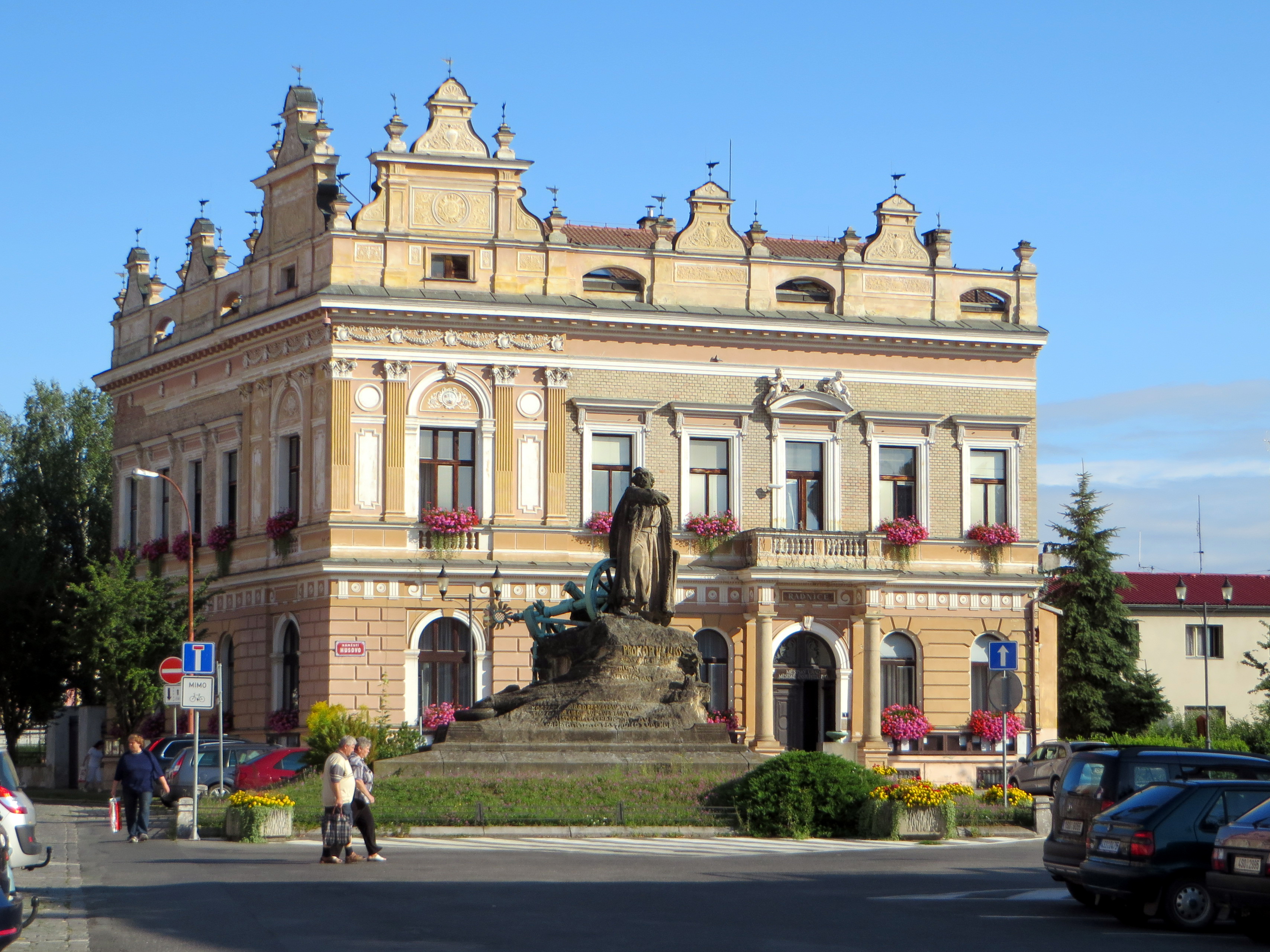
New Town Hall and Prokop the Great monument

The remains of the town walls have been preserved almost the entire perimeter of the old town. Despite their incompleteness, the preserved fortifications of Český Brod are among the most important examples of town fortifications from the reign of George of Poděbrady.

The Church of Saint Gotthard was originally a Romanesque church from the 1130s. It was rebuilt in the Gothic style in the mid-14th century, modified in the Renaissance style in the 17th century, and then completely rebuilt in the Baroque style in 1765–1772. A late Gothic belfry, built in 1578–1580, stands next to the church.

The Church of the Holy Trinity was built in the Renaissance style in 1560–1562. It was originally built behind the town walls as a cemetery church.

The Old Town Hall is one of the oldest town hall buildings in the Czech Republic. The originally Gothic house was built before 1402. Today it is the seat of an art gallery, the town's cultural and information centre and the town library. The premises of the former prison are used for exhibition purposes.

The current Neo-Renaissance town hall was built in 1897–1898. It has been used as the town hall since 1949 and is also protected as a cultural monument.

== Notable people ==
- František Rambousek (1886–1937), entomologist
- Jan Bočan (1937–2010), architect
- František Mrázek (1958–2006), entrepreneur; lived here
- Tomáš Skuhravý (born 1965), footballer

== Twin towns – sister cities ==
Český Brod is twinned with:

- Köngen, Germany

Český Brod also has friendly relations with Southwell in England, United Kingdom, and Pontarlier, France. In addition, Český Brod also cooperates with other Brods in the Czech Republic: Havlíčkův Brod, Uherský Brod, Vyšší Brod and Železný Brod.
