= Chvaletice =

- Town
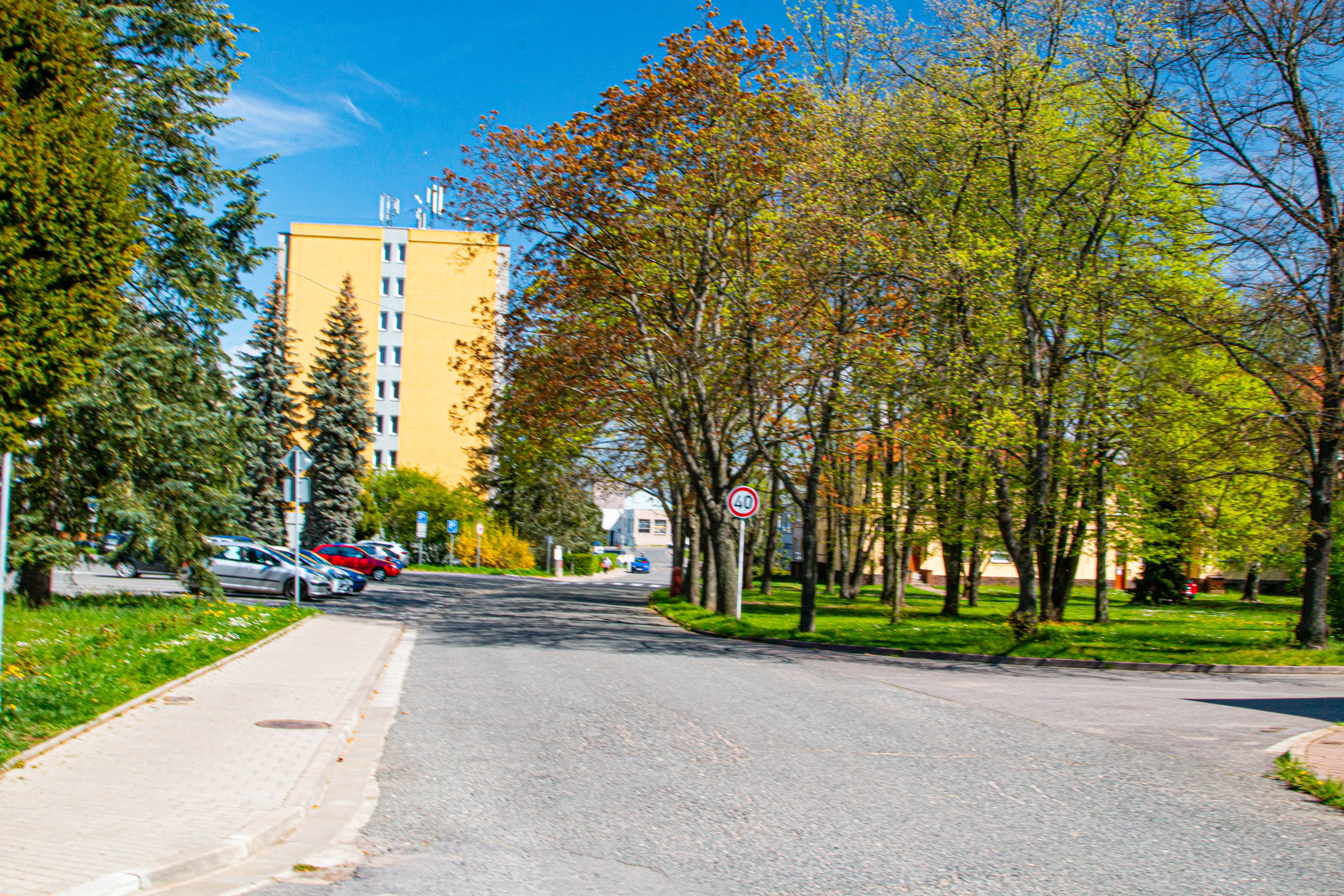
- Centre of Chvaletice

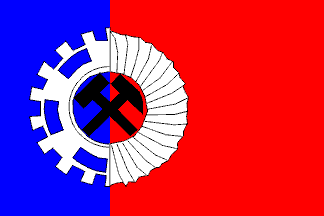
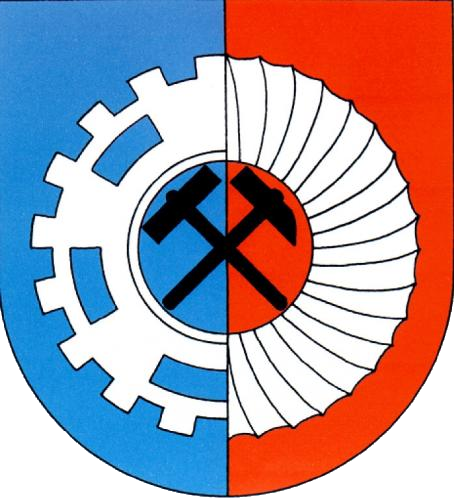
- Flag Coat of arms

- Location in the Czech Republic
- Coordinates: 50°2′4″N 15°25′7″E
- Country: Czech Republic
- Region: Pardubice
- District: Pardubice
- First mentioned: 1143

Government
  - Mayor: Renata Dymešová

Area
  - Total: 8.50 km^{2} (3.28 sq mi)
- Elevation: 222 m (728 ft)

Population (2026-01-01)
  - Total: 2,897
  - Density: 341/km^{2} (883/sq mi)
- Time zone: UTC+1 (CET)
  - Summer (DST): UTC+2 (CEST)
- Postal code: 533 12
- Website: www.chvaletice.cz

Chvaletice (Czech pronunciation: [ˈxvalɛcɪtsɛ]) is a town in Pardubice District in the Pardubice Region of the Czech Republic. It has about 2,900 inhabitants.

== Administrative division ==
Chvaletice consists of two municipal parts (in brackets population according to the 2021 census):

- Chvaletice (2,688)
- Hornická Čtvrť (118)

== Etymology ==
The name is derived from the personal name Chvalata, meaning "the village of Chvalata's people".

== Geography ==
Chvaletice is located about 25 kilometres (16 mi) west of Pardubice. It lies in the Polabí region; the northern part of the municipal territory lies in the East Elbe Table and the southern part lies in the northwestern tip of the Iron Mountains. The highest point is the flat hill Oklika at 308 m (1,010 ft) above sea level. The Elbe River forms the northern municipal border.

== History ==
In the area there were originally two villages, Telčice and Chvaletice, both administered by Chvaletice. The first written mention of Telčice comes from 1143 and of Chvaletice from 1393.

In 1953, Telčice became a separate municipality, however in 1975 Telčice and Chvaletice were merged into one municipality. In 1981, Chvaletice obtained town rights.

== Demographics ==
Historical population

Year	Pop.	±%
1869	818	—
1880	900	+10.0%
1890	866	−3.8%
1900	767	−11.4%
1910	793	+3.4%

Year	Pop.	±%
1921	814	+2.6%
1930	747	−8.2%
1950	778	+4.1%
1961	2,652	+240.9%
1970	2,539	−4.3%

Year	Pop.	±%
1980	3,031	+19.4%
1991	3,101	+2.3%
2001	3,312	+6.8%
2011	2,933	−11.4%
2021	2,806	−4.3%

Source: Censuses

== Economy ==
Since ancient times, iron ore was mined here, until the Thirty Years' War; then again since the end of 18th century. Mining of pyrite-manganese ore started in the 20th century. The mines got exhausted and were finally closed in 1975.

The tailings left behind after mining contain the largest manganese deposit in Europe. The Czech government declared it a strategic deposit in 2025 and plans are underway to begin mining it.

In 1973–1979, the Chvaletice Power Station was built, with the coal being moved in from mines in northern Bohemia by ships on the Elbe River. To make such shipping possible large excavation works (Elbe Waterway project) on the riverbed were carried out. Use of ships stopped in 1996.

== Transport ==
The I/2 road (the section from Pardubice to Kutná Hora) runs south of the town.

Chvaletice is located on the railway line Kolín–Česká Třebová.

== Sights ==
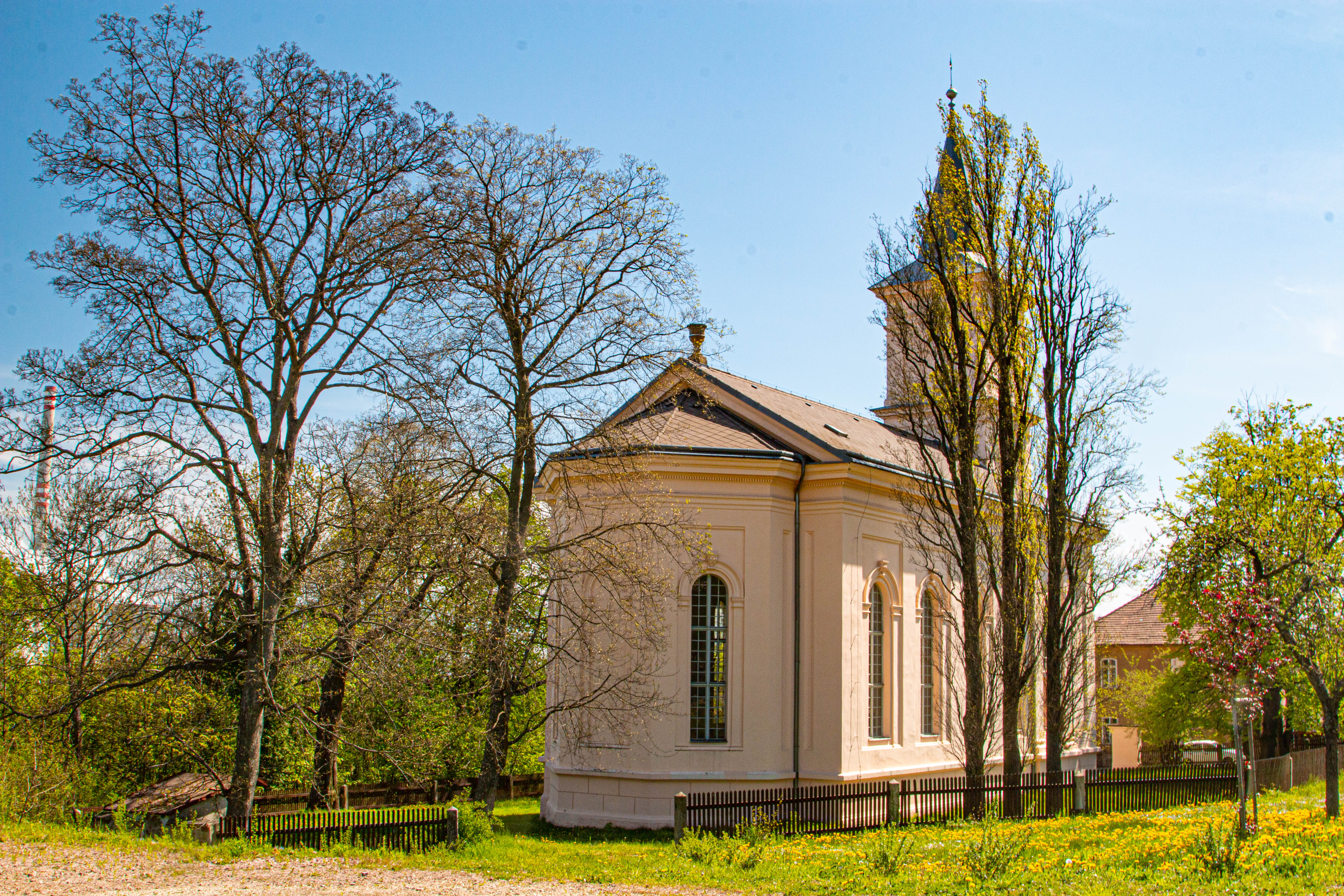
Evangelical church

The most valuable building is the Evangelical church in Hornická Čtvrť. It was built in the Neo-Renaissance style in 1882.
