= RKS Liblice 1 =

Defunct Czech radio transmitting station

Coordinates: 50°04′22″N 14°52′47″E

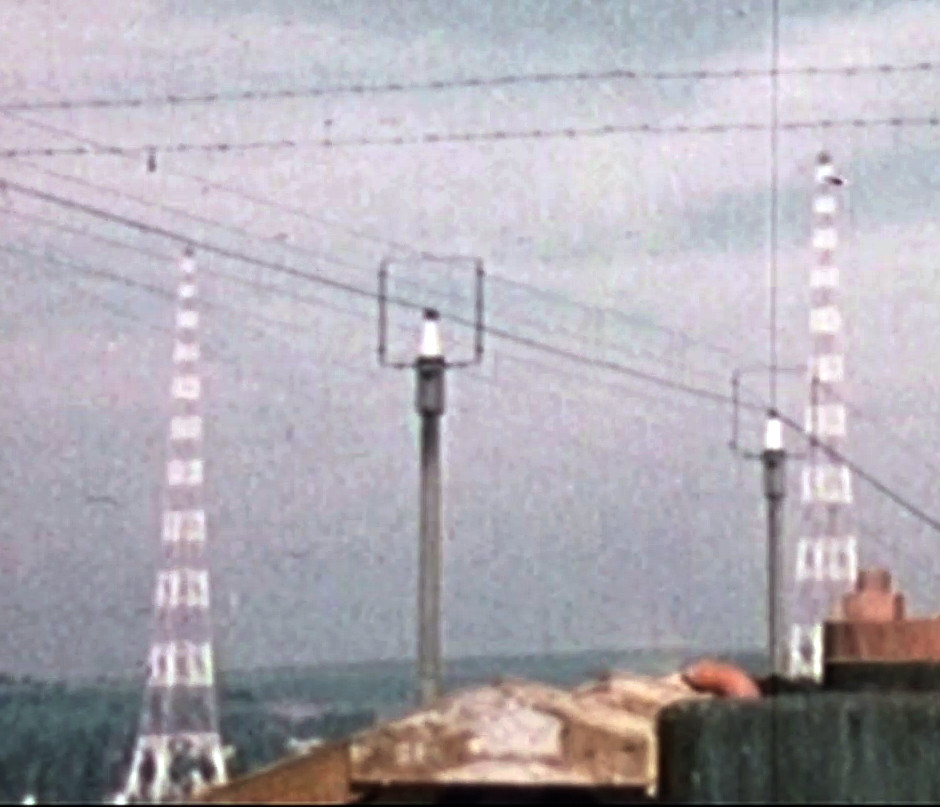

RKS Liblice 1 (Radiokomunikační středisko Liblice 1; also known as Liblice A) was a radio transmitting station located in the Czech Republic about 33 km (21 mi) east of Prague near Liblice. Built in 1929–1931 for Radiojournal, the predecessor of Czech Radio, it was the first broadcasting station at Liblice. Its two 150 m (492 ft) tall lattice steel towers stood until they were demolished by explosives on 11 August 2004.

== History ==
As early as 1919, the Czechoslovak Ministry of Defence selected land in the area for a military transmitter. About ten years later, the locality was considered again, this time for a broadcasting transmitter, because of its favourable position relative to Prague and the rest of the country. Construction began in 1929 on land closer to the village of Liblice than the site of the later RKS Liblice 2.

The station was built as a medium-wave broadcasting transmitter. Its T-antenna was strung between the two towers, which stood 250 m (820 ft) apart. Broadcasting from the Radiojournal studio in Prague began on 27 October 1931, and regular operation started on 31 December 1931 with a power of 120 kW, using a transmitter supplied by Standard Electric. Transmitting on 617 kHz, it was among the most powerful transmitters in Europe. In 1937, the T-antenna was replaced as the main broadcasting antenna by a Blaw-Knox mast on the adjacent site, where RKS Liblice 2 was later built. The original transmitter remained in service until 1959, when it was replaced by a Tesla transmitter with an output of 2 × 150 kW.

In May 1945, during the Czech uprising against the German occupation, 18 Czech insurgents were killed trying to take the transmitter, which was held by German soldiers; a memorial to them stands near the site.

From April 1958 until spring 1995, the T-antenna of Liblice 1 was used to broadcast the OMA time signal on 50 kHz in the LF band, with a reserve transmitter at Poděbrady. The towers were demolished by explosives on 11 August 2004.

== See also ==
- List of towers
- OMA (time signal)
