= Bezvěrov =

- Municipality
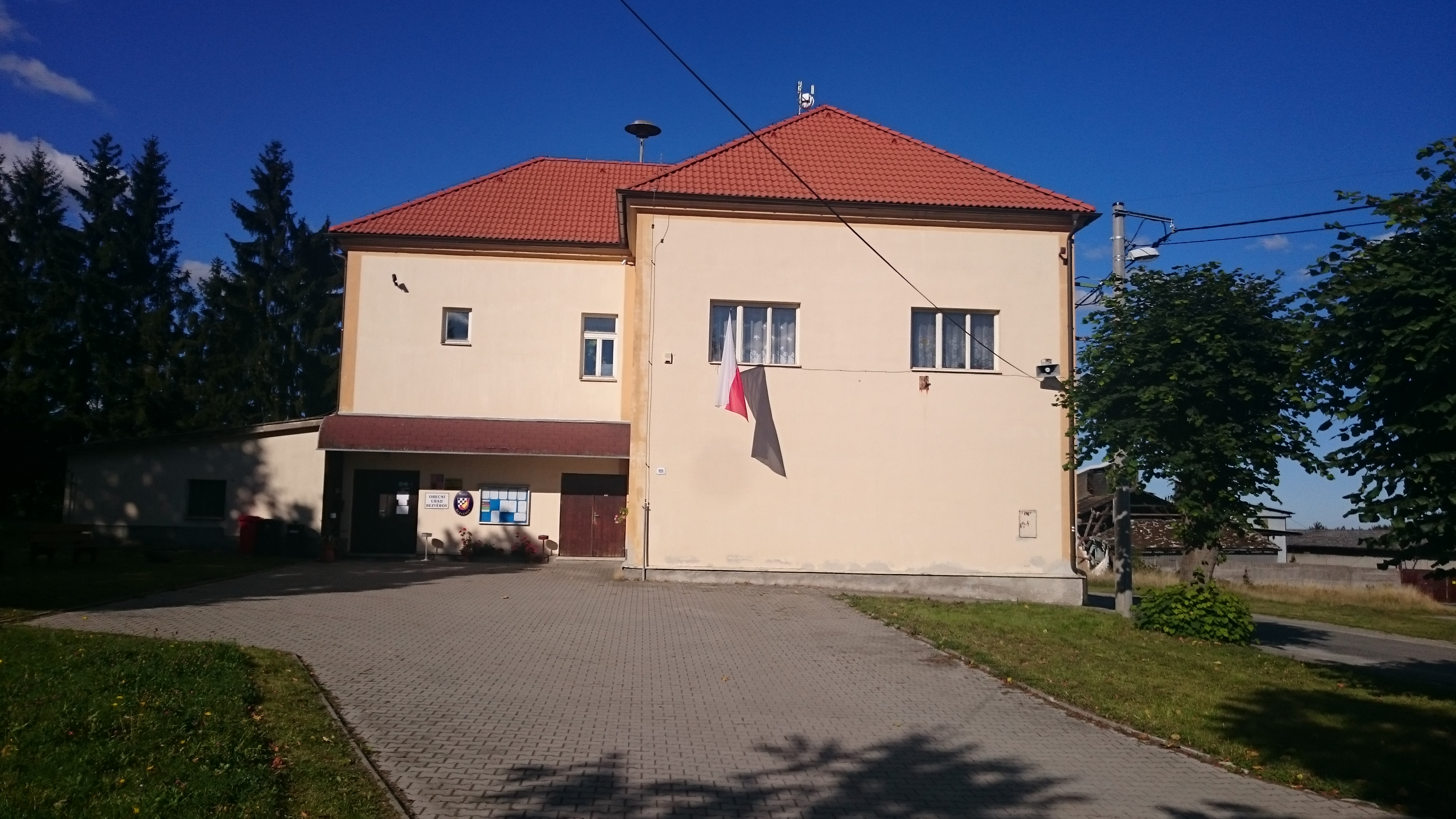
- Municipal office

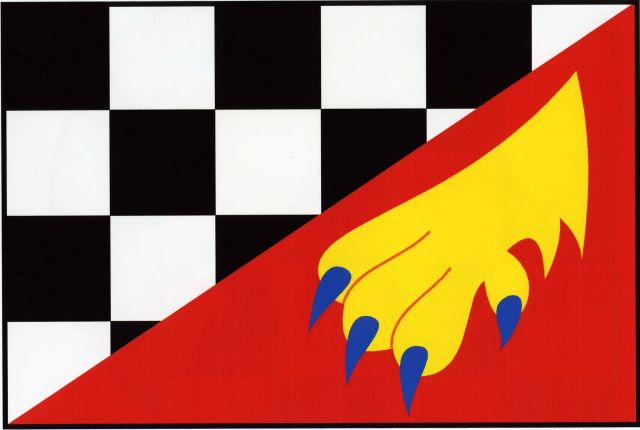
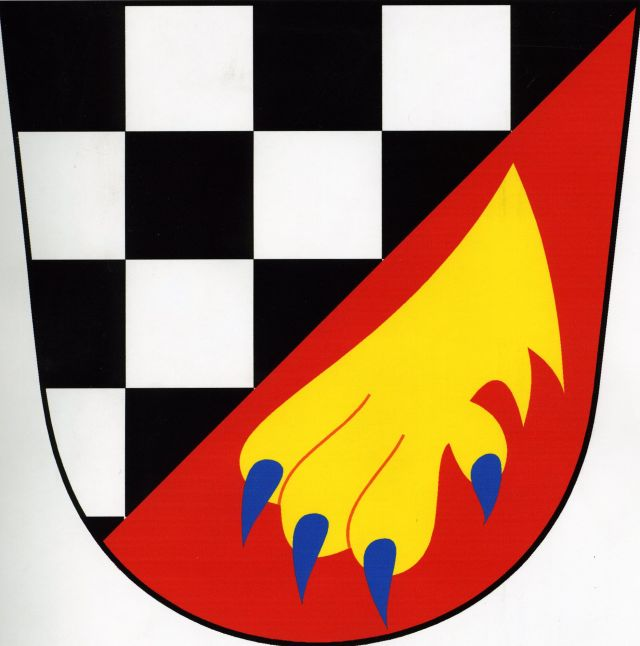
- Flag Coat of arms

- Location in the Czech Republic
- Coordinates: 49°59′42″N 13°3′33″E
- Country: Czech Republic
- Region: Plzeň
- District: Plzeň-North
- First mentioned: 1379

Area
  - Total: 44.48 km^{2} (17.17 sq mi)
- Elevation: 675 m (2,215 ft)

Population (2026-01-01)
  - Total: 666
  - Density: 15.0/km^{2} (38.8/sq mi)
- Time zone: UTC+1 (CET)
  - Summer (DST): UTC+2 (CEST)
- Postal code: 330 41
- Website: www.bezverov.cz

Bezvěrov (German: Bernklau) is a municipality and village in Plzeň-North District in the Plzeň Region of the Czech Republic. It has about 700 inhabitants.

Bezvěrov lies approximately 36 kilometres (22 mi) north-west of Plzeň and 98 km (61 mi) west of Prague.

== Administrative division ==
Bezvěrov consists of 11 municipal parts (in brackets population according to the 2021 census):

- Bezvěrov (390)
- Buč (23)
- Chudeč (33)
- Dolní Jamné (75)
- Krašov (21)
- Nová Víska (2)
- Potok (6)
- Služetín (35)
- Světec (18)
- Vlkošov (59)
- Žernovník (2)

== Demographics ==
Historical population
Year	Pop.	±%
1869	2,557	—
1880	2,485	−2.8%
1890	2,579	+3.8%
1900	2,567	−0.5%
1910	2,735	+6.5%
1921	2,647	−3.2%
1930	2,399	−9.4%
1950	801	−66.6%
1961	822	+2.6%
1970	723	−12.0%
1980	688	−4.8%
1991	651	−5.4%
2001	616	−5.4%
2011	662	+7.5%
2021	664	+0.3%
Source: Censuses

== Economy ==
There is a radio and television transmitter in Krašov. After the demolition of the Liblice broadcasting facility in 2026, it became the largest structure in the Czech Republic with a height of 347.5 metres (1,140 ft).
