= Liblice (Český Brod) =

- Village
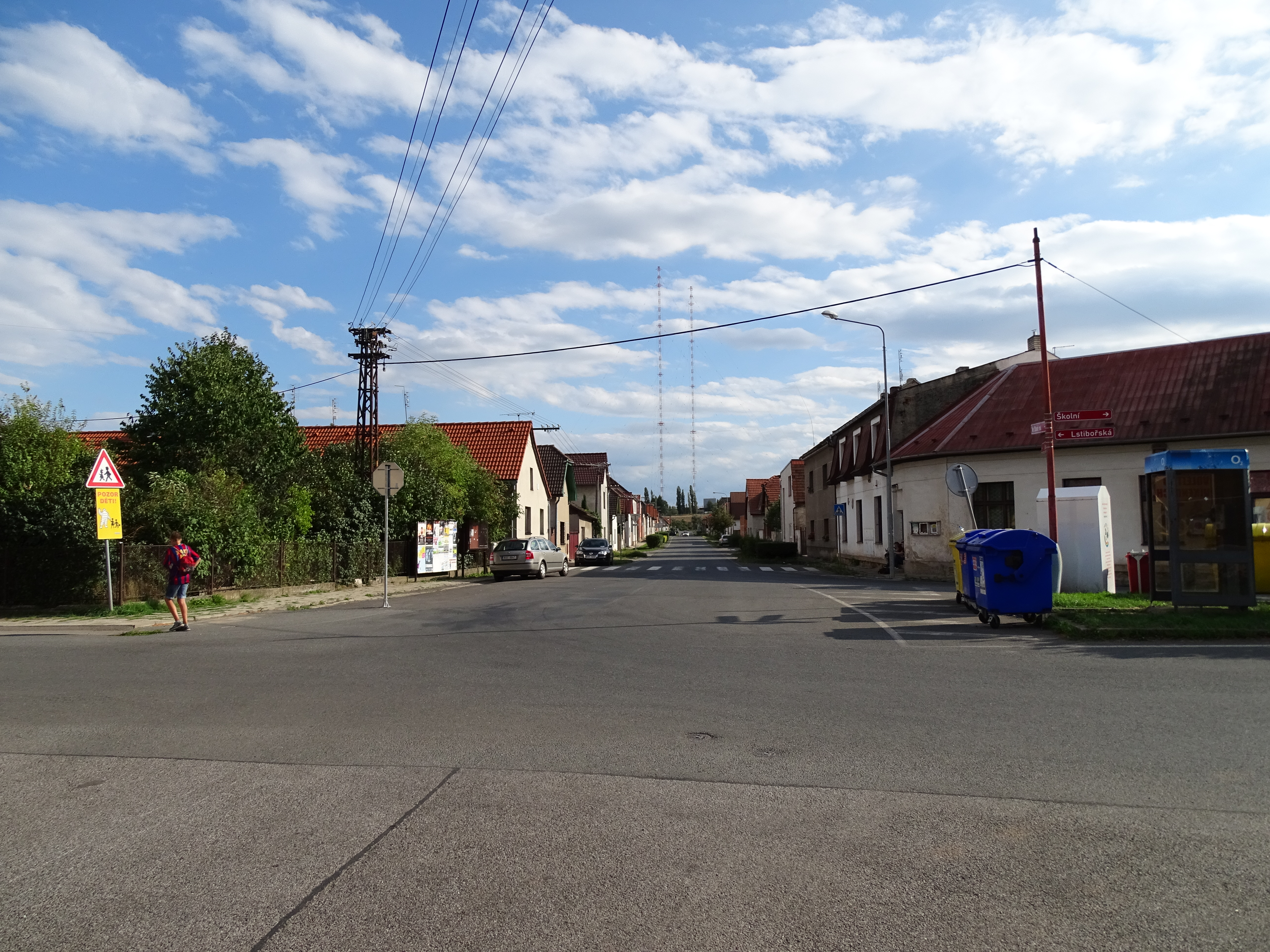
- Bylanská street

- Location in the Czech Republic
- Coordinates: 50°4′2″N 14°53′13″E
- Country: Czech Republic
- Region: Central Bohemian
- District: Kolín
- Municipality: Český Brod
- First mentioned: 1289

Area
  - Total: 5.57 km^{2} (2.15 sq mi)
- Elevation: 216 m (709 ft)

Population (2021)
  - Total: 899
  - Density: 161/km^{2} (418/sq mi)
- Time zone: UTC+1 (CET)
  - Summer (DST): UTC+2 (CEST)
- Postal code: 282 01

Liblice (German: Liblitz) is a village and municipal part of Český Brod in Kolín District in the Central Bohemian Region of the Czech Republic. It has about 900 inhabitants.

== History ==
The first written mention of Liblice is from 1289.

== Demographics ==
Historical population
Year	Pop.	±%
1869	244	—
1880	283	+16.0%
1890	323	+14.1%
1900	403	+24.8%
1910	502	+24.6%
1921	517	+3.0%
1930	813	+57.3%
1950	827	+1.7%
1961	807	−2.4%
1970	758	−6.1%
1980	767	+1.2%
1991	693	−9.6%
2001	698	+0.7%
2011	837	+19.9%
2021	899	+7.4%
Source: Censuses

== Sights ==
Liblice were known for its broadcasting facility:

- RKS Liblice 1- former transmitter
- RKS Liblice 2- former transmitter (Its two 355 m masts were the tallest towers used for mediumwave broadcasting in the world and also the tallest structure in the Czech Republic).
