= Nuclear power in the Czech Republic =

Nuclear power stations in the Czech Republic (view)
Active plants
Planned plants

The Czech Republic operates two nuclear power plants: Temelín and Dukovany. In 2019, the government set a goal to increase the share of nuclear electricity production from 30 % to 58 %. To this end, a new reactor is to be constructed at the Dukovany site, which will replace older units by 2035. New capacity is also proposed to be added at the Temelín site. In 2025, nuclear power produced approximately 42% of the country's electricity.

Map of nuclear power plants and research reactors

== History ==
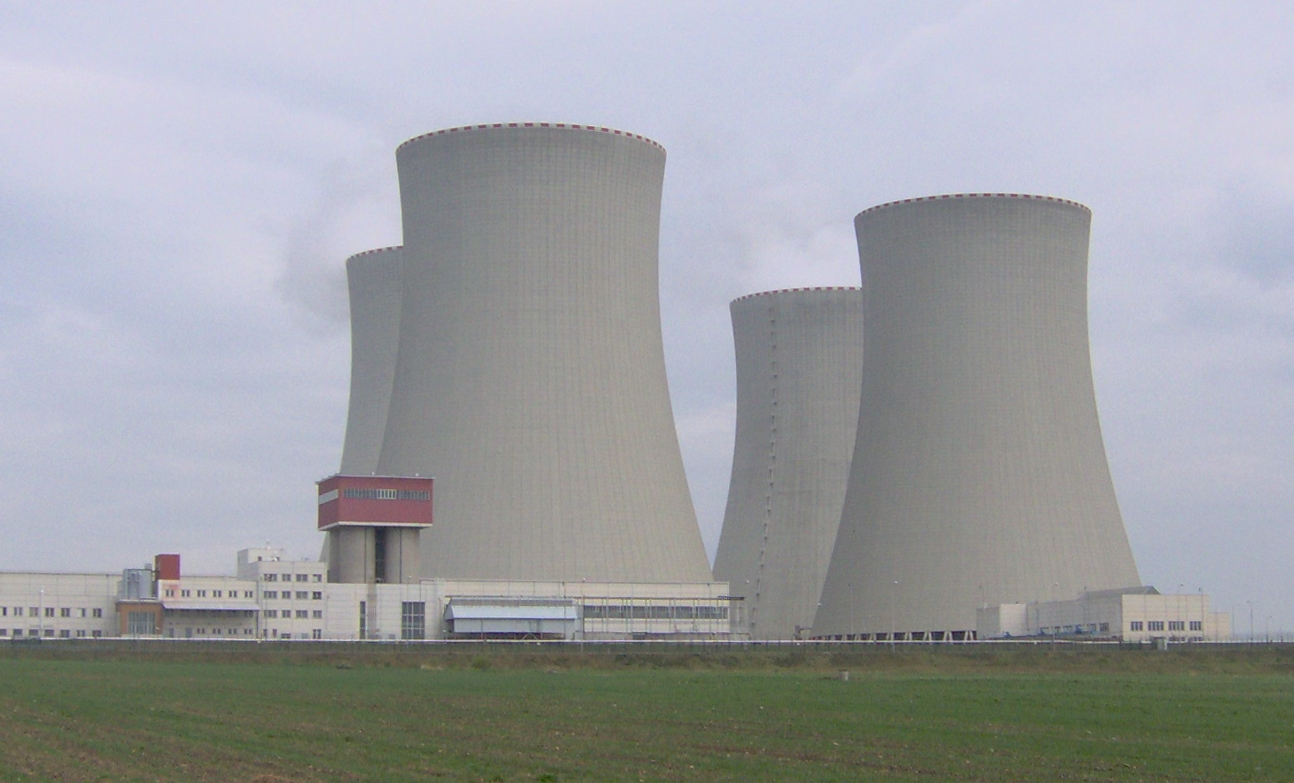
Temelín NPP

In 1955, with Soviet support, the Government committee for research and peaceful use of nuclear power and the Institute for Nuclear Physics were created. The first director of the Institute of Nuclear Physics was Professor Čestmír Šimáně, known as the founder of Czechoslovak nuclear research.

In August 1955, the first Faculty of Technical and Nuclear Physics was created under Charles University, in preparation for the upcoming construction of first nuclear power plants in Czechoslovakia. The faculty is now part of CTU.

In 1956 a decision was made to build the first nuclear power station in Czechoslovakia, in Jaslovské Bohunice, western Slovakia. The KS 150 or A1 reactor (120 MWe) was selected because of its ability to use unenriched uranium mined in Czechoslovakia. The KS 150 was designed in the Soviet Union and built in Czechoslovakia. Construction was burdened by many problems and took 16 years, longer than expected. In December 14, 1972 the plant was activated. In 1977 an accident stopped energy production and since 1979 the reactor has been partly dismantled, but not decommissioned.

In 1970 an agreement with the Soviet Union was made to build two power stations of the VVER reactor design. One plant was built again in Jaslovské Bohunice, the other in Dukovany (southern Moravia), both equipped with four reactors VVER-440 v. 213 producing 440 MWe each. The first new reactor in Jaslovské Bohunice was activated in 1978, the remaining 7 during the 1980s.

At the end of the 1970s a decision was made to build two more power stations: Temelín (southern Bohemia, 4 × VVER-1000, 1000 MWe) and Mochovce (southern Slovakia, 4 × VVER-440 v. 213, 440 MWe). In 1990, due to a decision by the government of Marián Čalfa, the Temelín station was limited to two reactors. The construction of Temelín also experienced delays and went over budget.

The fluoride volatility method of reprocessing used nuclear fuel was developed at the Řež nuclear research institute at Řež.

== Spent fuel ==
The Czech Republic has no state policy on storage or reprocessing of nuclear waste, and the responsibility for this falls to the Czech Power Company (ČEZ). The ČEZ does not believe reprocessing is economical at this time, and stores spent fuel until the Radioactive Waste Repository Authority (RAWRA) assumes responsibility for it. The RAWRA will select a permanent location for storage by 2015 and construction will begin on this site after 2050.

== Czech—Austrian relations ==
The Czech Republic and Austria have had disagreements concerning the Temelín Nuclear Power Station only 50 km from the Czech–Austrian border. Austria had threatened the Czech Republic with difficulties in joining the EU if the plant was commissioned. Other opponents to this power station compare it to the power plant in Chernobyl. In fact, Chernobyl had RBMKs, and Temelín would have VVERs. The Czech President at the time, Václav Havel, called the plant "megalomaniacal".

== Proposed expansion ==
The Czech Energy Policy of 2004 envisaged building two or more large reactors to replace Dukovany power plant after 2020. The plans announced in 2006 envisaged construction of one 1,500 MWe unit at Temelín after 2020, and a second to follow.

- The simplest expansion of nuclear capacity would be completion of the two units at Temelín, which were cancelled after the Velvet Revolution in 1989. In 2005 a recommendation by the Ministry of Industry suggested adding two 600 MWe reactors there before the year 2025. In August 2009, ČEZ launched a tendering process for two pressurized water reactors (PWRs) for units 3 and 4.
- Several locations in the Czech lands were investigated and selected for new stations during the 1980s: the village of Blahutovice (northern Moravia, near Ostrava), the village of Tetov (eastern Bohemia, near Pardubice), the town of Mníšek pod Brdy (central Bohemia) and a nuclear heating plant in Prague-Radotín.

In 2019, the Czech government gave preliminary approval for at least one new nuclear power unit at Dukovany Nuclear Power Station for about 2035 to replace four units expected to shut down between 2035 and 2037. The financial model proposed is a state guarantee so finance can be obtained at government interest rates, but no subsidy on operating costs or above market-price electricity rates.

In October 2023, Westinghouse with an AP1000, EDF with an EPR1200 and Korea Hydro & Nuclear Power (KHNP) with an APR1000 submitted binding bids for a fifth unit at Dukovany. In February 2024, the Czech government changed the tender to binding offers for four new units, excluding Westinghouse. In July, KHNP was selected, and contract negotiations began with an objective of first commercial operation in 2038. However in August, the Czech competition authority stated that Westinghouse and EDF had asked for a review of the tender process.

=== Blahutovice ===
Blahutovice, a village located in an isolated and thinly populated area, was selected in 1986 because of convenient geological conditions. A power station (JEBL) with two VVER-1000 reactors was proposed, together with a new dam in Hustopeče nad Bečvou. In 2000, the proposed start date for construction was not expected until 2015, if at all.

=== Tetov ===
Initially, Opatovice nad Labem (home of a large coal powered power plant) was selected, but its location between the cities of Hradec Králové and Pardubice was unfavorable and the more distant village of Tetov was chosen. One plan suggested building a nuclear heating plant in Opatovice nad Labem instead.

The power station required an area of 150 hectares and was to have two or four VVER-1000 reactors, producing 1000 MWe each and also providing heating for the Hradec Králové-Pardubice agglomeration, and for Prague (using a 67 km long steam pipeline). Construction was to begin in 1996 and the reactors to be activated between 2004–2008. The cost was estimated to be 60 billion (10^{9}) Kčs.

== Nuclear waste storage ==
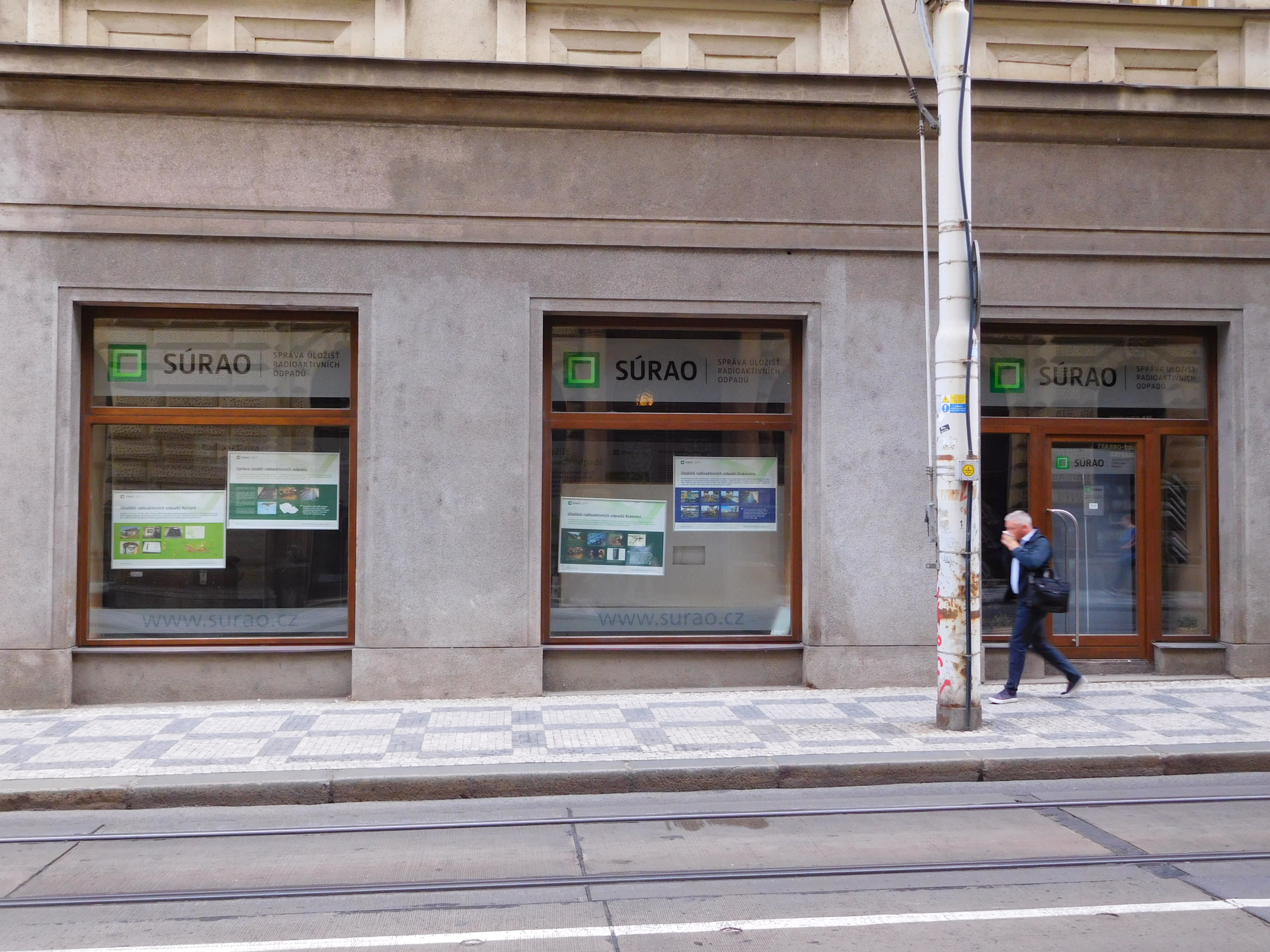
Headquarters of the Radioactive Waste Repository Authority of the Czech Republic

Nuclear waste produced by the power stations and the other smaller reactors in the country is exported to Russia (or the Soviet Union before 1991), who supply the enriched uranium. A programme from 1980s recommended the building of an underground storage site to keep waste for reprocessing in the future. Geological exploration started during the second half of the 1990s. Eleven candidate locations have been selected but the process is not finished as of 2006. The possibility of storing waste on the Temelín station site is being considered.

== Public opinion ==
Most Czechs support further expansion of nuclear power use, with support at 60 % in 2007.

Those living near nuclear waste storage facilities argue that proposals for expansion of nuclear power block development of such areas, discourage investment and make the areas unattractive for tourists. Several villages organized referendums against planned waste storage and regional governments have tried to put up legal and administrative obstacles to new stations.

In 2008, a poll found that 64 % of Czechs agree with the use of nuclear power, the highest level of support of the 27 EU countries surveyed, alongside Lithuania. Furthermore, the poll indicated that support was rising, from 52 % in 2004 to 64 % in 2008.

An IBRS survey found that support for nuclear energy has risen to 65 % in 2021.

== See also ==
- Energy in the Czech Republic
