= Dalešice =

Dalešice may refer to places in the Czech Republic:

- Dalešice (Jablonec nad Nisou District), a municipality and village in the Liberec Region
- Dalešice (Třebíč District), a market town in the Vysočina Region
- Dalešice, a village and part of Bítouchov in the Central Bohemian Region
- Dalešice, a village and part of Neveklov in the Central Bohemian Region
- Dalešice Hydro Power Plant, a hydroelectric power plant in the Vysočina Region
- Dalešice Reservoir, a reservoir in the Vysočina Region
