= Aspergillus marvanovae =

Scientific classification
- Kingdom: Fungi
- Division: Ascomycota
- Class: Eurotiomycetes
- Order: Eurotiales
- Family: Aspergillaceae
- Genus: Aspergillus
- Species: A. marvanovae

Binomial name
- Aspergillus marvanovae Hubka, S.W. Peterson, Frisvad & M. Kolařík (2013)

Type strain
- CCM 8003

Species of fungus

Aspergillus marvanovae is a species of fungus in the genus Aspergillus which has been isolated from water with high boracic acid anions from the Dukovany nuclear power station in the Czech Republic. It is from the Fumigati section. Several fungi from this section produce heat-resistant ascospores, and the isolates from this section are frequently obtained from locations where natural fires have previously occurred. The species was first described in 2014. Aspergillus marvanovae produces apolar indoloterpenes.

== Growth and morphology ==
A. marvanovae has been cultivated on both Czapek yeast extract agar (CYA) plates and Malt Extract Agar Oxoid® (MEAOX) plates. The growth morphology of the colonies can be seen in the pictures below.

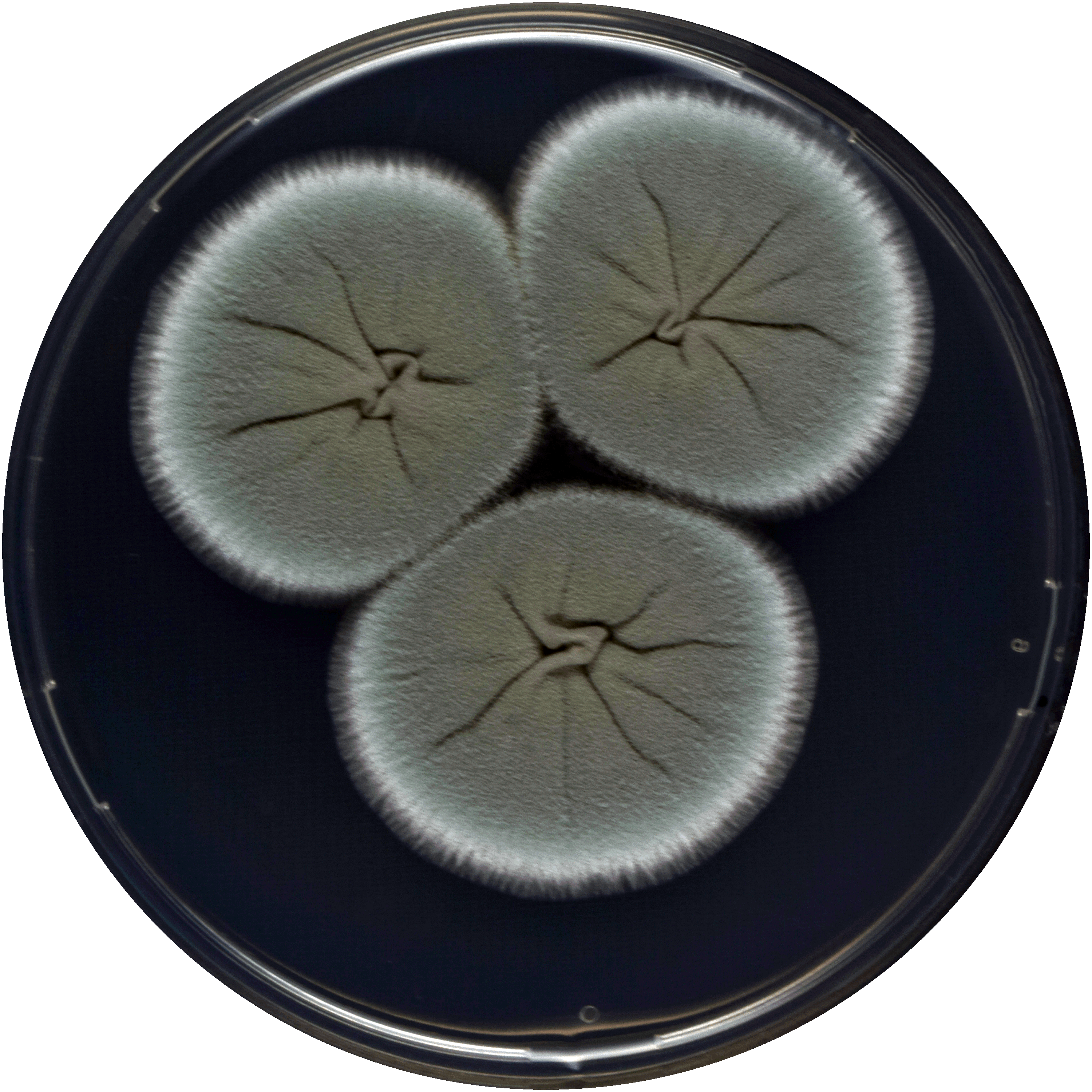
Aspergillus marvanovae growing on CYA plate

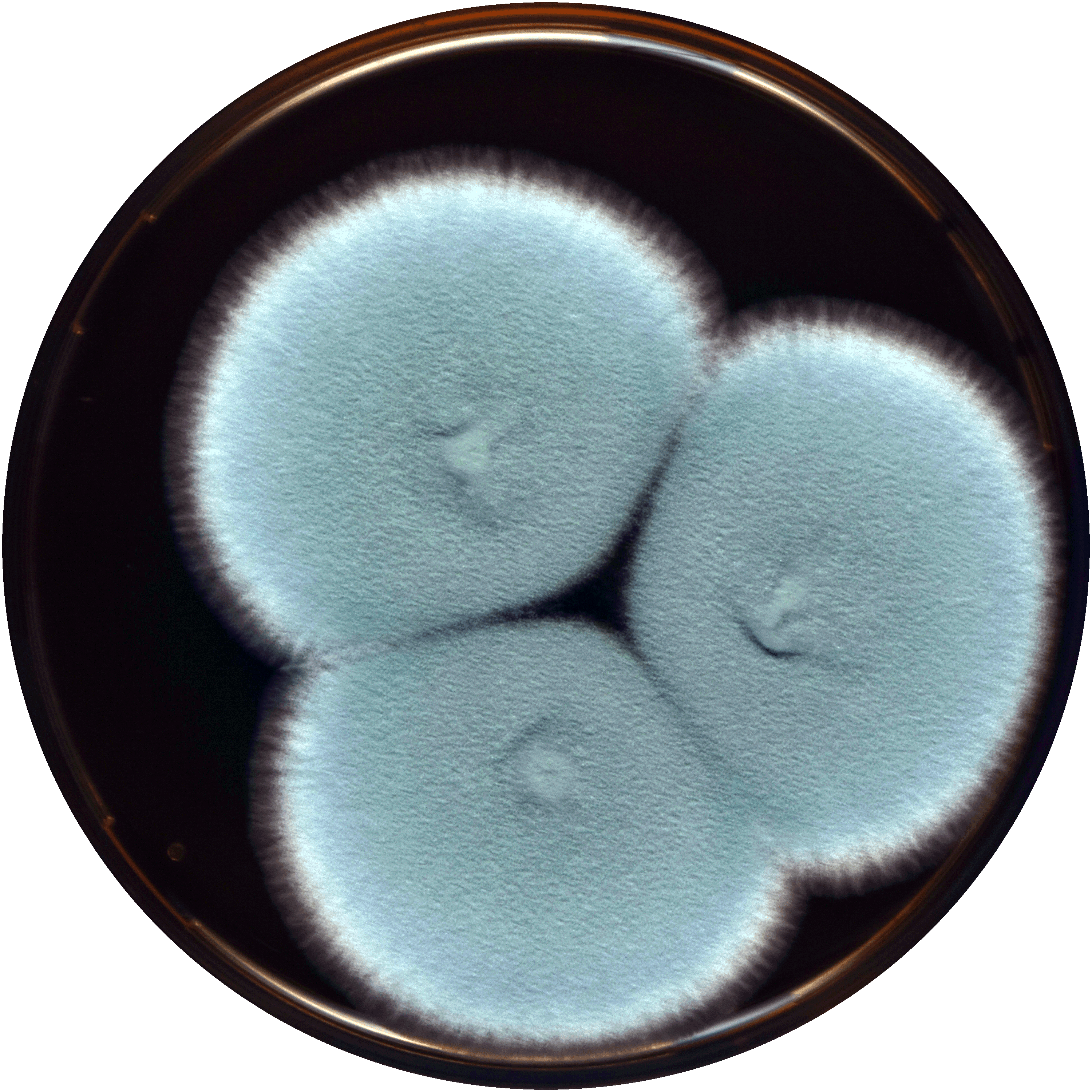
Aspergillus marvanovae growing on MEAOX plate
