= Třesov =

- Municipality
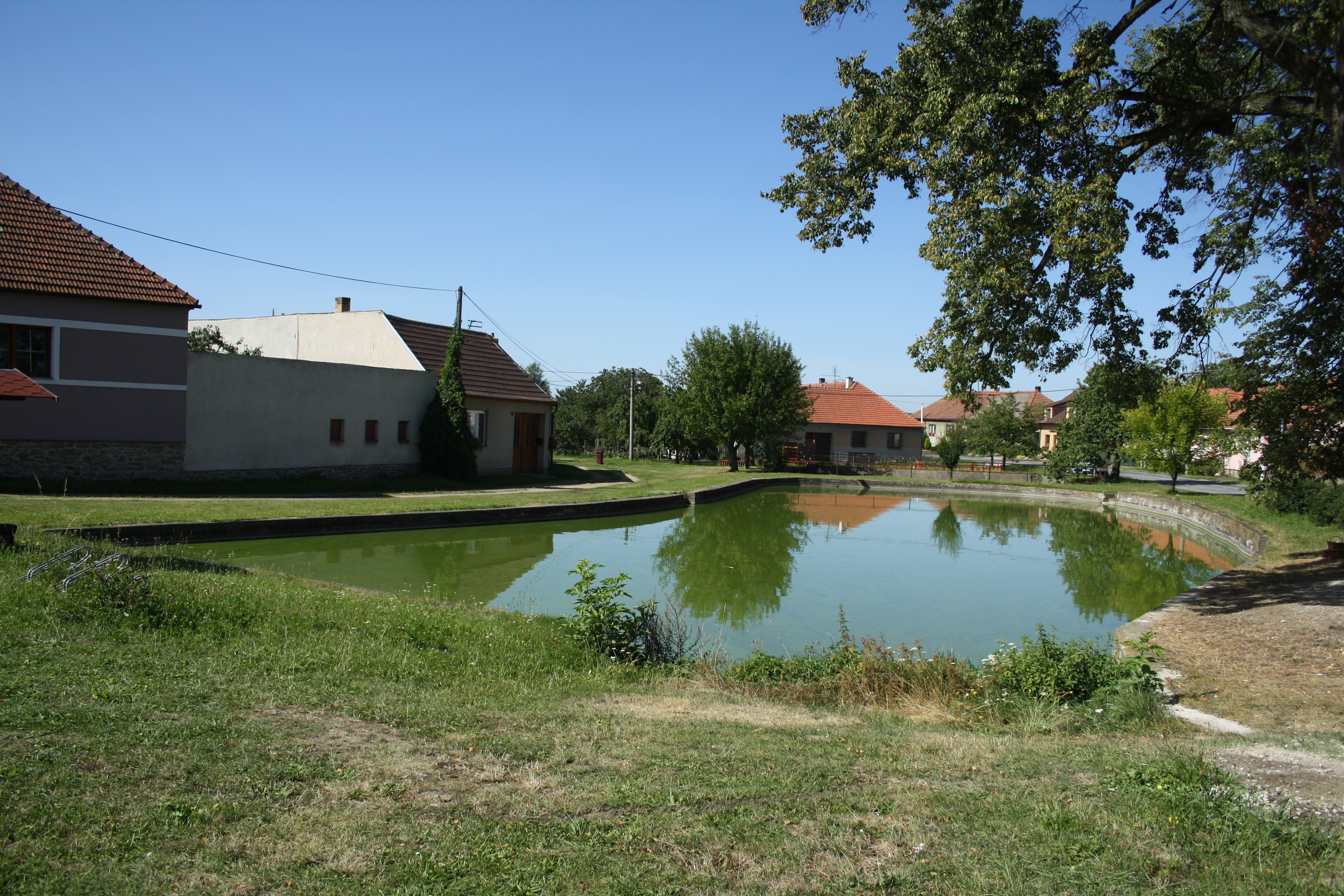
- Centre of Třesov

- Location in the Czech Republic
- Coordinates: 49°10′49″N 16°4′58″E
- Country: Czech Republic
- Region: Vysočina
- District: Třebíč
- First mentioned: 1464

Area
  - Total: 4.30 km^{2} (1.66 sq mi)
- Elevation: 451 m (1,480 ft)

Population (2026-01-01)
  - Total: 107
  - Density: 24.9/km^{2} (64.4/sq mi)
- Time zone: UTC+1 (CET)
  - Summer (DST): UTC+2 (CEST)
- Postal code: 675 02
- Website: www.tresov.cz

Třesov is a municipality and village in Třebíč District in the Vysočina Region of the Czech Republic. It has about 100 inhabitants.

== Geography ==
Třesov is located about 15 kilometres (9 mi) east of Třebíč and 37 km (23 mi) west of Brno. It lies in the Jevišovice Uplands. The highest point is at 468 m (1,535 ft) above sea level. The southern municipal border is formed by the Dalešice Reservoir.

== History ==
The first written mention of Třesov is from 1464. Throughout its history, the village was owned by the monastery in Třebíč.

== Demographics ==
Historical population

Year	Pop.	±%
1869	169	—
1880	153	−9.5%
1890	179	+17.0%
1900	185	+3.4%
1910	157	−15.1%

Year	Pop.	±%
1921	166	+5.7%
1930	193	+16.3%
1950	160	−17.1%
1961	179	+11.9%
1970	151	−15.6%

Year	Pop.	±%
1980	119	−21.2%
1991	109	−8.4%
2001	98	−10.1%
2011	94	−4.1%
2021	101	+7.4%

Source: Censuses

== Transport ==
There are no railways or major roads passing through the municipality.

== Sights ==
The main landmark and the only protected cultural monument in Třesov is the Chapel of Saint John of Nepomuk with a belfry, located in the centre of the village. It dates from 1857.
