= Radioactive Waste Repository Authority =

- Správa úložišť radioaktivních odpadů

Agency overview
- Formed: 1 June 1997
- Headquarters: Dlážděná 6, 110 00; Prague 1, Czech Republic; 50°5′13.28″N 14°25′56.5″E
- Agency executive: RNDr. Lukáš Vondrovic, Ph.D., Director
- Parent agency: Ministry of Industry and Trade
- Website: www.surao.cz

The Czech Radioactive Waste Repository Authority (Czech: Správa úložišť radioaktivních odpadů, abbreviation SÚRAO) was established on 1 June 1997 as a state organisation established by the Ministry of Industry and Trade. In 2001, SÚRAO assumed the status of a government agency. The Authority is headed by its managing director, Dr. Jiří Slovák (since 2014). The governing body of SÚRAO consists of its Board which is made up of representatives from the government, radioactive waste producers and the general public. The managing director and members of the Board of SÚRAO are directly appointed by the Minister of Industry and Trade.

== SÚRAO's activities ==
The mission of the Radioactive Waste Repository Authority is to ensure the safe disposal of radioactive waste in the Czech Republic in accordance with requirements concerning the protection of the population and the environment from any harmful effects. SÚRAO's principal responsibilities include:

- the safe operation of existing radioactive waste repositories;
- preparation for the construction of a deep geological repository for high-level waste;
- maintaining records of accepted radioactive waste and its producers;
- management of levies paid by radioactive waste producers to the Nuclear Account;
- ensuring and coordinating research and development in the field of radioactive waste management;
- provision of services in the field of radioactive waste management.

SÚRAO's activities are directed principally by provisions set out in the Atomic Act and its various implementing regulations, the Concept of Radioactive Waste and Spent Nuclear Fuel Management in the Czech Republic and other relevant legislation. In addition, the treatment of radioactive waste is subject to international treaties and recommendations relating to the use of nuclear energy and ionising radiation which have been adopted by the Czech Republic.

== Existing repositories ==
The Czech Republic currently has three radioactive waste repositories in operation: The Richard repository located in the former limestone mine of the same name near Litoměřice (60 km north west of Prague), the Bratrství repository located in a former uranium mine near Jáchymov (140 km north west of Prague) and the Dukovany repository located within the Dukovany nuclear power plant complex (200 km south east of Prague). The Hostim repository near Beroun (Central Bohemia) ceased operation more than 50 years ago.

=== Richard repository ===
The repository covers a total area of 16 hectares and is located near the town of Litoměřice. The surface area contains the operations building, an information centre, a laboratory and a fully accredited facility for the testing of waste containers and so-called special form radioactive materials. The total available volume of the former mining complex exceeds 17,000m^{3}, while the underground capacity which has been designed specifically for the storage of waste comprises 10,250m^{3}; the remainder is made up of service corridors and other service areas. The Richard repository is intended primarily for the storage of so-called institutional waste which is generated by the health, industry, agriculture and research sectors. Items disposed of include contaminated work clothes, damaged emitters and syringes.

=== Bratrství repository ===
The Bratrství repository at Jáchymov is located in one section of the underground complex of an abandoned former uranium mine of the same name. The repository itself makes up only a small part of the mining works which takes up a total area of 9.8 square kilometres with more than 80 km of tunnels and crosscuts. Since its commissioning the Bratrství repository has been reserved solely for waste containing natural radionuclides. Waste of this category is created mainly in the decommissioning of certain types of emitters used in the health care and research sectors. The repository has a radioactive waste storage capacity of around 360m^{3} which will soon be exhausted. The final date and method of closure of the repository will be dependent on the future volume of stored radioactive waste; notwithstanding, decommissioning is planned for around 2020.

=== Dukovany repository ===
The Dukovany surface repository occupies an area of 1.3 hectares within the Dukovany nuclear power plant complex and was designed specifically for the disposal of low- and intermediate-level waste from the Dukovany and Temelin nuclear power plants. The total volume of storage space amounts to 55,000 cubic meters, i.e. enough for around 180,000 waste drums. This capacity will be sufficient for the storage of all the operational waste produced by both plants even if their planned lifetimes should be extended to 40 years. The Dukovany repository provides for the storage of both liquid and solid radioactive waste. Solid waste includes contaminated protective clothing, cleaning cloths, packaging materials, paper, foil, electrical installation materials, construction debris etc.; liquid radioactive waste consists of waste water.

== Deep geological repository for spent nuclear fuel and high-level waste in Czech Republic ==
Every year Czech nuclear power plants produce approximately 80 to 100 tonnes of spent nuclear fuel. The State Energy Concept, drawn up by the Ministry of Industry and Trade, presumes that the production of nuclear power will increase in the future. Whether produced by currently operational or future new reactors, there will always be sources of spent nuclear fuel and high level waste to be disposed of.

At present, the potential exists to reprocess spent nuclear fuel for further use in certain types of reactors. Nevertheless, high-level waste will still be produced which will eventually have to be disposed of and isolated from the environment. Therefore, even those countries that reprocess spent nuclear fuel (e.g. France) are building deep geological repositories. In addition, the responsibility to dispose of one's "own" waste is, in most states, including the Czech Republic, reflected in relevant legislation which prohibits the import and storage of radioactive waste and the export of such waste from other countries. Hence, it is essential that the Czech Republic constructs its own deep geological repository.

The deep geological repository will provide a facility in which high-level waste will be safely stored and isolated from the environment for hundreds of thousands of years thanks to the so-called multi-barrier system which is made up of a natural barrier (the rock mass which will remain stable for several million years) and technical (or engineered) barriers, e.g. the waste container.

=== Safety ===
The key to both the construction and long-term safety of the deep geological repository rests in the selection of the most suitable site. It is necessary that the various rock property requirements be fully met in addition to a number of other equally important conditions including local public acceptance, the technical potential for the construction of the complex surface area of the repository and accessibility. In order to ensure the safety of the repository, it will be necessary, from the geological point of view, to find a stable rock formation, determine its origin and evolution over tens to hundreds of millions of years and ascertain that the rock mass will maintain the desired geological properties for the required length of time.

The search for a suitable site for a deep geological repository commenced shortly after the commissioning of the first nuclear units at the Dukovany nuclear power plant, i.e. in the 1980s. In the 1990s the first study was conducted aimed at evaluating the potential of the geological conditions of the whole of the Czech Republic. At that time international research and experimentation began aimed at identifying the most appropriate materials and methods with concern to the construction of both the repository itself and the engineered barriers. Thanks to the multi-barrier system (a system of complementary natural and man-made barriers that completely prevents, or at least minimises, the escape of radionuclides for a period of hundreds of thousands of years), deep repositories represent the safest way in which to dispose of high-level radioactive waste.

== Radioactive waste ==
Radioactive waste is generated when working with radioactive materials and is defined by the Atomic Law as "objects or equipment containing or contaminated by radionuclides for which no further use is foreseen". It can be classified according either to origin or quantity of radionuclides contained (i.e. activity level).

=== Classified according to origin ===
- Waste from the nuclear power sector - liquids, slurries, equipment and materials which have come into contact with radionuclides at nuclear power plants; in the future it will also include spent nuclear fuel and other radioactive waste that cannot be stored in existing repositories.
- Institutional waste - created in the medical, industrial, agricultural and research sectors including e.g. old measuring equipment and radioactive emitters, contaminated work clothing, fabrics, paper, syringes, etc.

=== Classified according to activity level ===
- Low-level waste - containing small amounts of radionuclides which can be stored in surface repositories.
- Intermediate-level waste - containing greater amounts of radionuclides than low-level waste but which, unlike high-level waste, release only a small amount of heat.
- High-level waste – highly radioactive materials that emit significant amounts of heat. Cooling and shielding is necessary so as to protect the environment from their potential adverse effects. Safe disposal is possible only in deep geological repositories.

The nuclear power sector and smaller generators in the Czech Republic produce approximately 450 tonnes of low- and intermediate-level waste per year; approximately 100 tonnes of spent nuclear fuel is produced annually.

== History of radioactive waste storage in Czech Republic ==
The history of radioactive waste storage goes back to the mid-20th century. Radioactive waste began to accumulate in the early stages of the nuclear arms race (during the Cold War) and, particularly, due to the rapid development of the nuclear power sector in the 1960s and 70s (the Czechoslovak authorities took the first steps towards the construction of the Dukovany nuclear power plant as early as in 1970). Scientists were thus confronted with the question of where to dispose of the waste so that it would have no harmful effects on humans or the environment.

=== Low- and intermediate-level waste ===
The problem of the disposal of low- and intermediate-level waste was soon successfully resolved through the introduction of storage in surface repositories.

The first such facility in the Czech Republic consisted of the now-closed Hostim radioactive waste repository located three kilometres east of Beroun (Central Bohemia). The actual operation of the Hostim facility lasted only for a short time; the first waste packages were delivered to the repository by the Institute for the Research, Production and Use of Radioisotopes in 1959 and operation ended on 9 August 1965, whereupon the State assumed responsibility for the facility.

The second repository to be opened consisted of the Richard (near Litoměřice) facility which remains in operation to the present day. As with Hostim, the Richard repository is located in a former limestone mine. During World War II the Nazis partially reconstructed the underground complex as a factory for the production of car parts. The first official proposal to use the Richard II mining complex for the storage of radioactive waste was put forward in 1959. Low- and intermediate-level institutional radioactive waste has been stored at the repository since 1964.

In 1974, ten years following the opening of the Richard repository, the Bratrství repository was put into operation. Situated in a reconstructed former uranium mine near Jáchymov, the Bratrství facility serves for the storage of radioactive waste containing only natural radionuclides.

The Dukovany radioactive waste repository, which is situated within the complex of the nuclear power plant of the same name, is the most recently opened Czech repository. The construction of the facility commenced in 1987 and it has been in operation since 1995. Dukovany is primarily used for the storage of waste generated through the production of electricity (i.e. not for the storage of spent nuclear fuel or high-level waste).

SÚRAO has been responsible for the operation of the Richard, Bratrství and Dukovany repositories since 2000 and is also responsible for the safety monitoring of the now-closed Hostim repository.

=== Spent nuclear fuel and high-level waste ===
During the construction phase of the first nuclear power plants in Czechoslovakia (during the communist era), it was assumed that spent nuclear fuel would be transported free of charge to the Soviet Union. Following the political changes of 1989, however, it became apparent that spent nuclear fuel would have to remain in Czechoslovakia (later the Czech Republic). Therefore, in 1992 the Ministry of the Economy was charged with developing a new radioactive waste management concept which included the final disposal of spent nuclear fuel. Two years later, the Ministry of the Economy established the Council for the Coordination of the Development of a Deep Geological Repository, subsequently abbreviated to the Council of Six (the Ministry of Industry and Trade, Ministry of the Economy, ČEZ, a.s. (the Czech Power Company), the Ministry of the Environment, the State Office for Nuclear Safety and ÚJV (Nuclear Research Institute) Řež, a.s.). This development provided the impetus for the creation of the Czech Republic's own nuclear waste disposal concept.

The Atomic Act of 1997 established the Czech Radioactive Waste Repository which, in addition to assuming all obligations relating to the operation of near-surface radioactive waste repositories, also assumed responsibility for the radioactive waste and spent nuclear fuel concept. In 2002 the government approved the concept and thus officially declared that the basic strategy of the Czech Republic involved the direct disposal of spent nuclear fuel in a deep geological repository.

Similar developments were also witnessed abroad. In the 1990s those countries producing high-level waste came to the consensus that the disposal issue needed to be addressed. After years of research, the majority of states which produced electricity by means of nuclear power plants, agreed that the best way to store spent nuclear fuel was in deep rock formations. This option meets both safety and technical feasibility conditions and, moreover, is economically viable.
