= Dukovany =

- Municipality
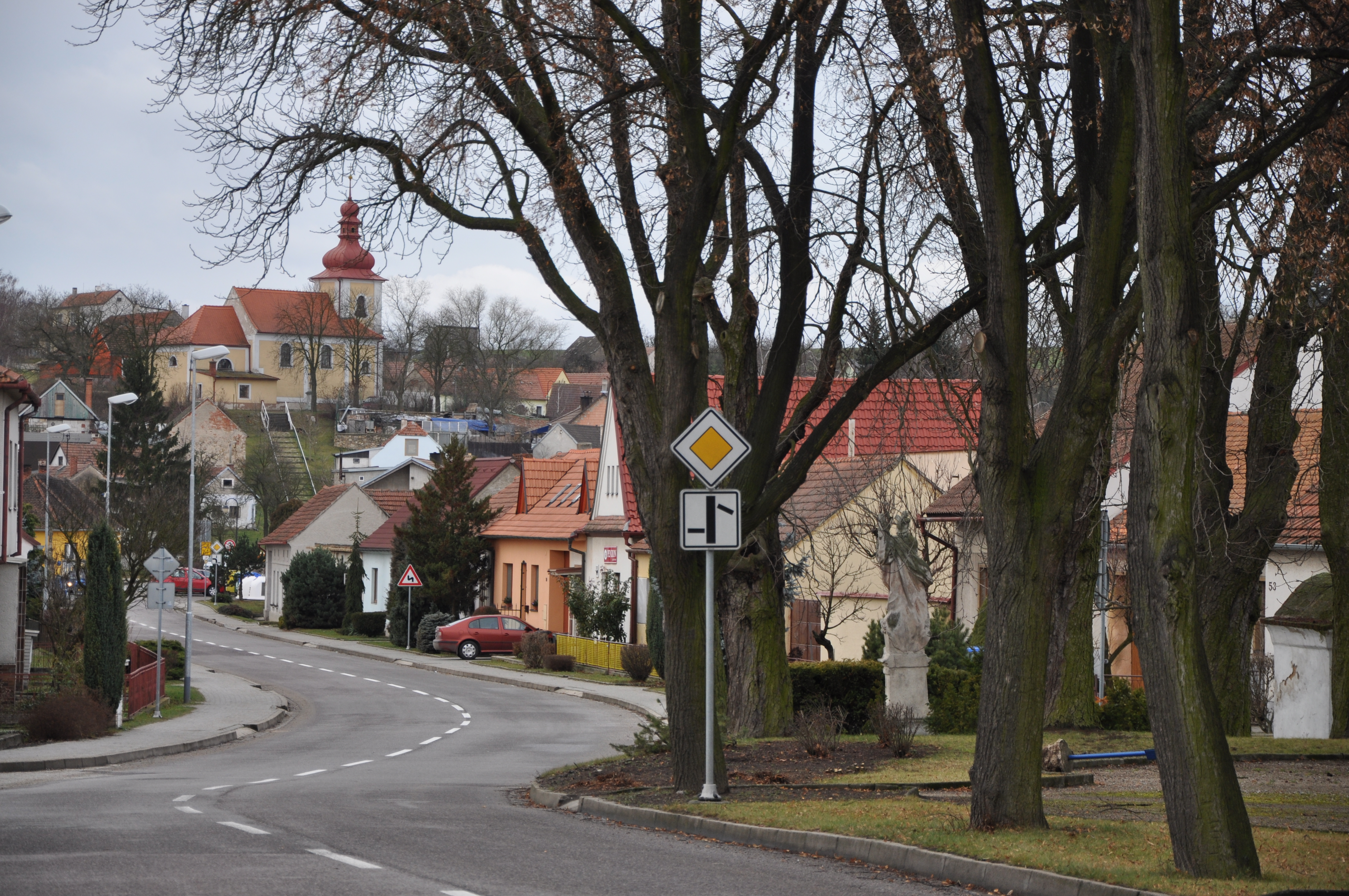
- Centre of Dukovany

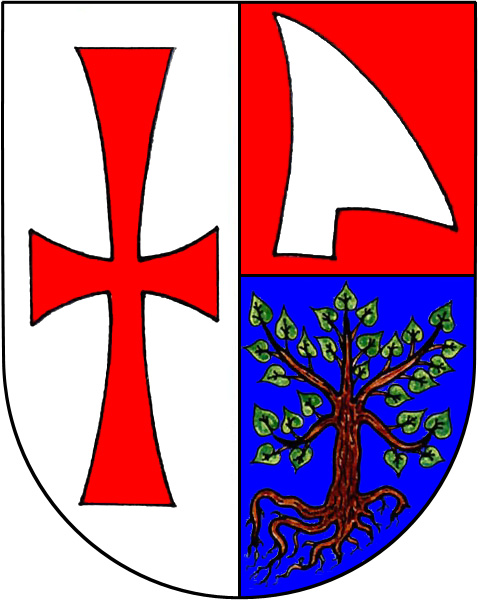
- Flag Coat of arms

- Location in the Czech Republic
- Coordinates: 49°4′53″N 16°11′32″E
- Country: Czech Republic
- Region: Vysočina
- District: Třebíč
- First mentioned: 1263

Area
  - Total: 20.37 km^{2} (7.86 sq mi)
- Elevation: 352 m (1,155 ft)

Population (2026-01-01)
  - Total: 853
  - Density: 41.9/km^{2} (108/sq mi)
- Time zone: UTC+1 (CET)
  - Summer (DST): UTC+2 (CEST)
- Postal code: 675 56
- Website: www.obecdukovany.cz

Dukovany is a municipality and village in Třebíč District in the Vysočina Region of the Czech Republic. It has about 900 inhabitants. It is known for the Dukovany Nuclear Power Station.

== Geography ==
Dukovany is located about 27 kilometres (17 mi) southeast of Třebíč and 31 km (19 mi) southwest of Brno. It lies in the Jevišovice Uplands. The village lies on the stream Dukovanský potok, which flows into the Jihlava River. The Jihlava and the Mohelno Reservoir, built on the river, form the northern municipal border.

=== Climate ===
Dukovany's climate is classified as humid continental climate (Köppen: Dfb; Trewartha: Dcbo). Among them, the annual average temperature is 9.1 °C (48.4 °F), the hottest month in July is 19.5 °C (67.1 °F), and the coldest month is −1.3 °C (29.7 °F) in January. The annual precipitation is 484.5 millimetres (19.07 in), of which July is the wettest with 71.5 millimetres (2.81 in), while February is the driest with only 17.0 millimetres (0.67 in). The extreme temperature throughout the year ranged from −22.7 °C (−8.9 °F) on 12 February 1985 to 37.4 °C (99.3 °F) on 13 August 2003.

Climate data for Dukovany, 1991–2020 normals, extremes 1983–present
Month	Jan	Feb	Mar	Apr	May	Jun	Jul	Aug	Sep	Oct	Nov	Dec	Year
Record high °C (°F)	15.0 (59.0)	17.6 (63.7)	22.5 (72.5)	27.0 (80.6)	32.2 (90.0)	34.3 (93.7)	36.8 (98.2)	37.4 (99.3)	31.4 (88.5)	26.5 (79.7)	18.3 (64.9)	14.9 (58.8)	37.4 (99.3)
Mean daily maximum °C (°F)	1.3 (34.3)	3.6 (38.5)	8.5 (47.3)	14.8 (58.6)	19.3 (66.7)	23.3 (73.9)	25.9 (78.6)	25.4 (77.7)	19.4 (66.9)	12.9 (55.2)	6.6 (43.9)	1.9 (35.4)	13.6 (56.5)
Daily mean °C (°F)	−1.3 (29.7)	0.1 (32.2)	3.9 (39.0)	9.5 (49.1)	13.8 (56.8)	17.4 (63.3)	19.5 (67.1)	19.4 (66.9)	14.2 (57.6)	8.8 (47.8)	3.9 (39.0)	−0.5 (31.1)	9.1 (48.4)
Mean daily minimum °C (°F)	−3.8 (25.2)	−3.1 (26.4)	0.1 (32.2)	4.0 (39.2)	8.3 (46.9)	11.6 (52.9)	13.6 (56.5)	13.7 (56.7)	9.7 (49.5)	5.4 (41.7)	1.5 (34.7)	−2.7 (27.1)	4.9 (40.8)
Record low °C (°F)	−22.1 (−7.8)	−22.7 (−8.9)	−16.1 (3.0)	−6.6 (20.1)	−2.9 (26.8)	0.8 (33.4)	4.8 (40.6)	3.8 (38.8)	0.1 (32.2)	−5.8 (21.6)	−13.0 (8.6)	−20.2 (−4.4)	−22.7 (−8.9)
Average precipitation mm (inches)	21.6 (0.85)	17.0 (0.67)	28.4 (1.12)	28.8 (1.13)	56.5 (2.22)	63.2 (2.49)	71.5 (2.81)	58.4 (2.30)	49.8 (1.96)	33.3 (1.31)	30.6 (1.20)	25.4 (1.00)	484.5 (19.07)
Average snowfall cm (inches)	11.5 (4.5)	8.8 (3.5)	6.2 (2.4)	0.4 (0.2)	0.0 (0.0)	0.0 (0.0)	0.0 (0.0)	0.0 (0.0)	0.0 (0.0)	0.1 (0.0)	3.7 (1.5)	9.5 (3.7)	40.2 (15.8)
Average precipitation days (≥ 1.0 mm)	6.0	4.8	6.2	6.1	9.0	8.4	9.4	7.6	6.4	6.9	6.8	6.4	84.0
Average relative humidity (%)	86.1	80.1	74.3	66.0	68.7	68.7	65.4	65.6	73.9	82.6	88.2	88.5	75.7
Mean monthly sunshine hours	53.3	84.5	140.3	203.3	233.5	238.4	249.8	242.3	170.1	108.9	48.8	39.9	1,813
Source 1: NOAA
Source 2: Czech Hydrometeorological Institute

== History ==
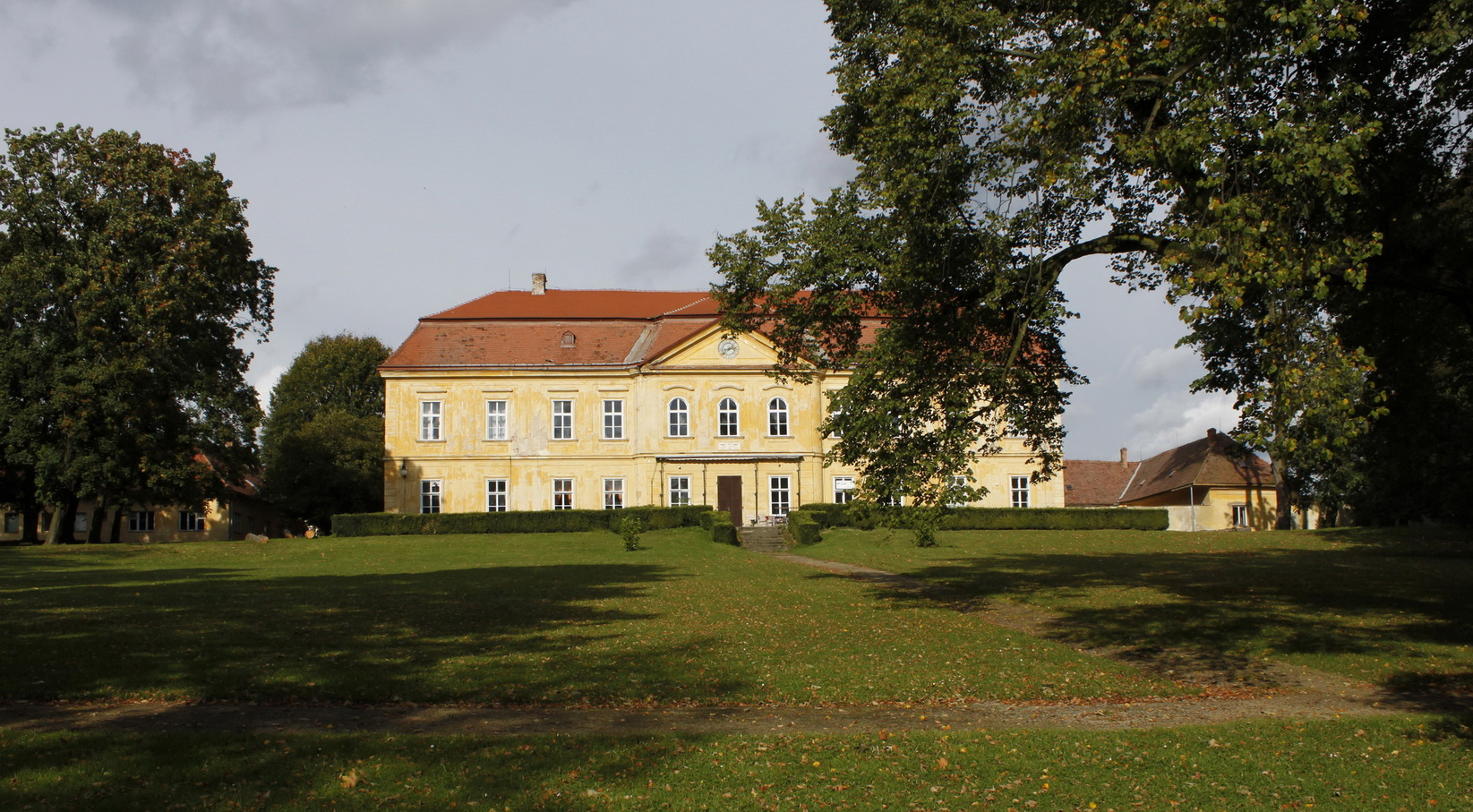
Dukovany Castle

The first written mention of Dukovany (under its original name Tokovany) is from 1263. In the second half of the 13th century it was given to the order of the Knights Templar. In 1298, Alšík of Dukovany was mentioned as the owner of the nearby Rabštejn Castle.

In 1325, King John of Bohemia sold the settlement to Jindřich of Lipá, which indicates that the Dukovany family had died out at that time. The property belonged to the castle of Rabštejn. After its capture and destruction in 1446 it became a part of the king's domain. Later on, the village was added to the Moravský Krumlov estate, which belonged to the lords of Lipá. At the end of the 16th century, Dukovany became an independent estate which changed owners rather often.

Since the 1970s, the built-up area has been rearranged and replaced by family residences, with the construction focusing on the downhill area below the Dukovany Castle. In 1974–1987, a nuclear power station was constructed with a northern by-pass road and housing area for about 1,500 workers, which was the reason for demolishing the villages of Skryje, Heřmanice, and Lipany.

== Demographics ==
Historical population

Year	Pop.	±%
1869	1,014	—
1880	1,042	+2.8%
1890	1,077	+3.4%
1900	1,164	+8.1%
1910	1,179	+1.3%

Year	Pop.	±%
1921	1,201	+1.9%
1930	1,206	+0.4%
1950	1,037	−14.0%
1961	1,095	+5.6%
1970	979	−10.6%

Year	Pop.	±%
1980	669	−31.7%
1991	650	−2.8%
2001	736	+13.2%
2011	798	+8.4%
2021	843	+5.6%

Source: Censuses

== Economy ==
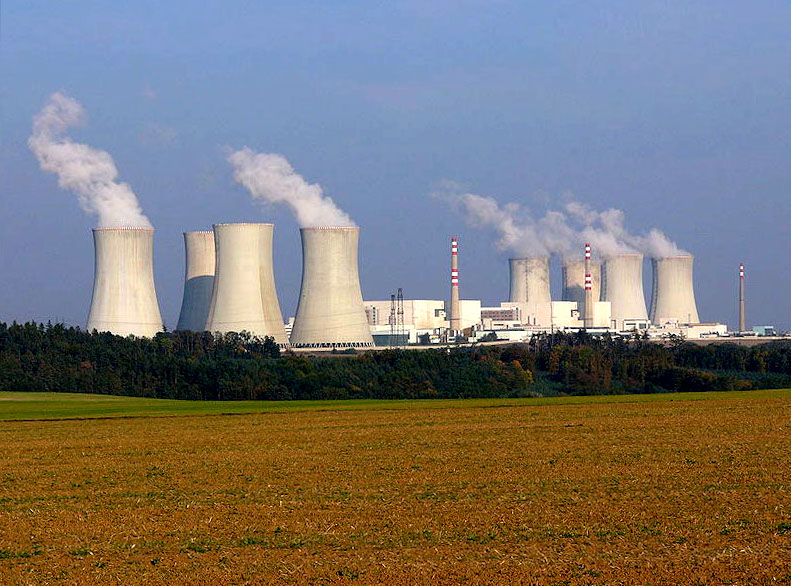
Dukovany Nuclear Power Station

Dukovany Nuclear Power Station, one of the two Czech nuclear power stations, is located in the municipality.

== Transport ==
There are no railways (except for the spur line for the needs of the nuclear power station) or major roads passing through the municipality.

== Sights ==
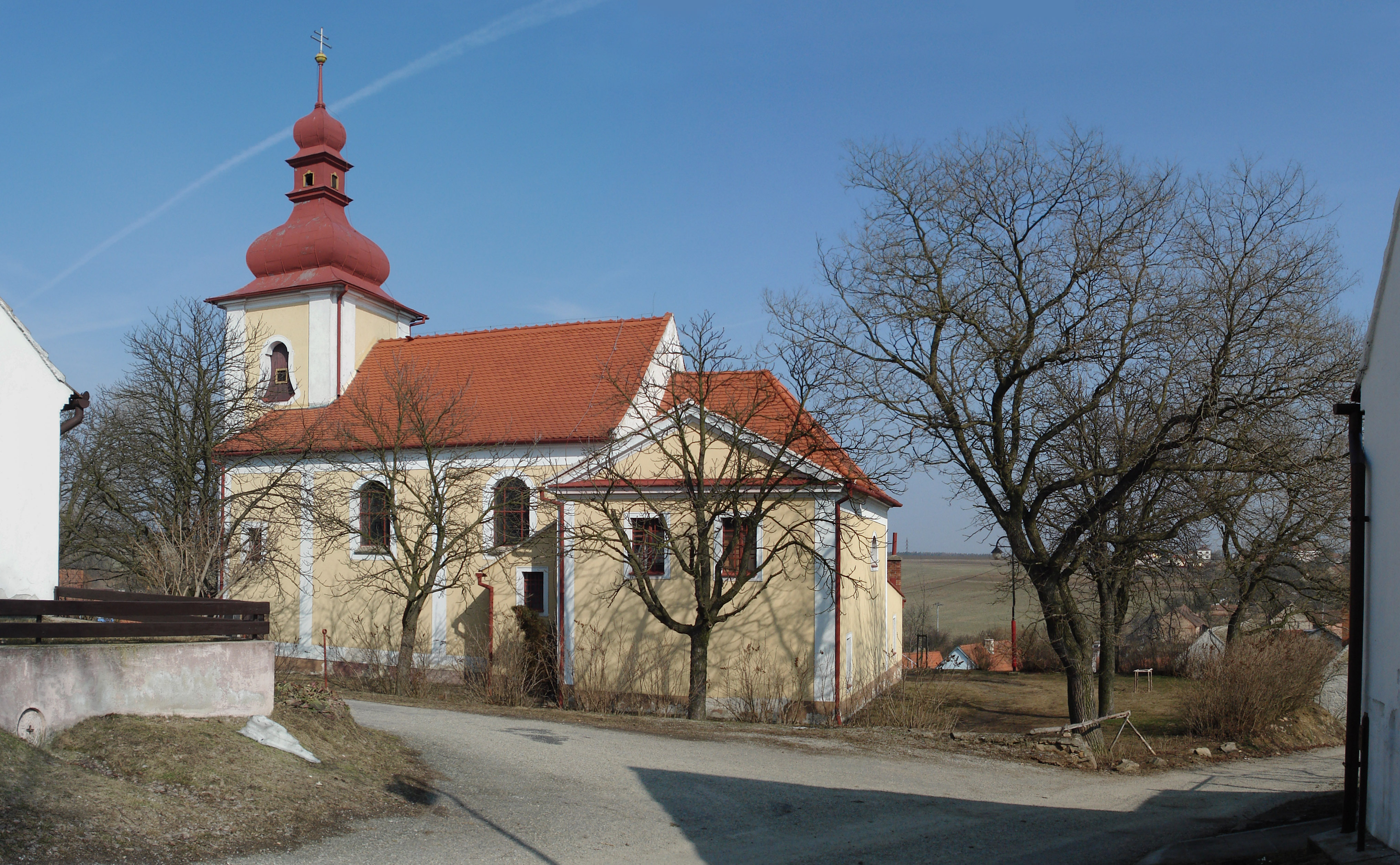
Church of Saint Wenceslaus

The main landmark of Dukovany is the Church of Saint Wenceslaus. It was built by the Templars and consecrated in 1279. In the 17th century, it was modified in the Baroque style. In the 1970s, remnants of splendid fresco decorations from the 13th century were uncovered and restored.

The original manor house was turned into a late Baroque castle with Neoclassical elements in 1790. Its two large halls are decorated with frescoes by the important Moravian late Baroque painter Josef Winterhalder. A large English park is also a part of the castle premises.

Rabštejn Castle has unclear origin and date of construction. In the 15th century, it was destroyed, and in 1486, it is already mentioned as a ruin. Only few fragments has been preserved. The ruin of the castle is freely accessible.
