= Husinec (Prague-East District) =

- Municipality
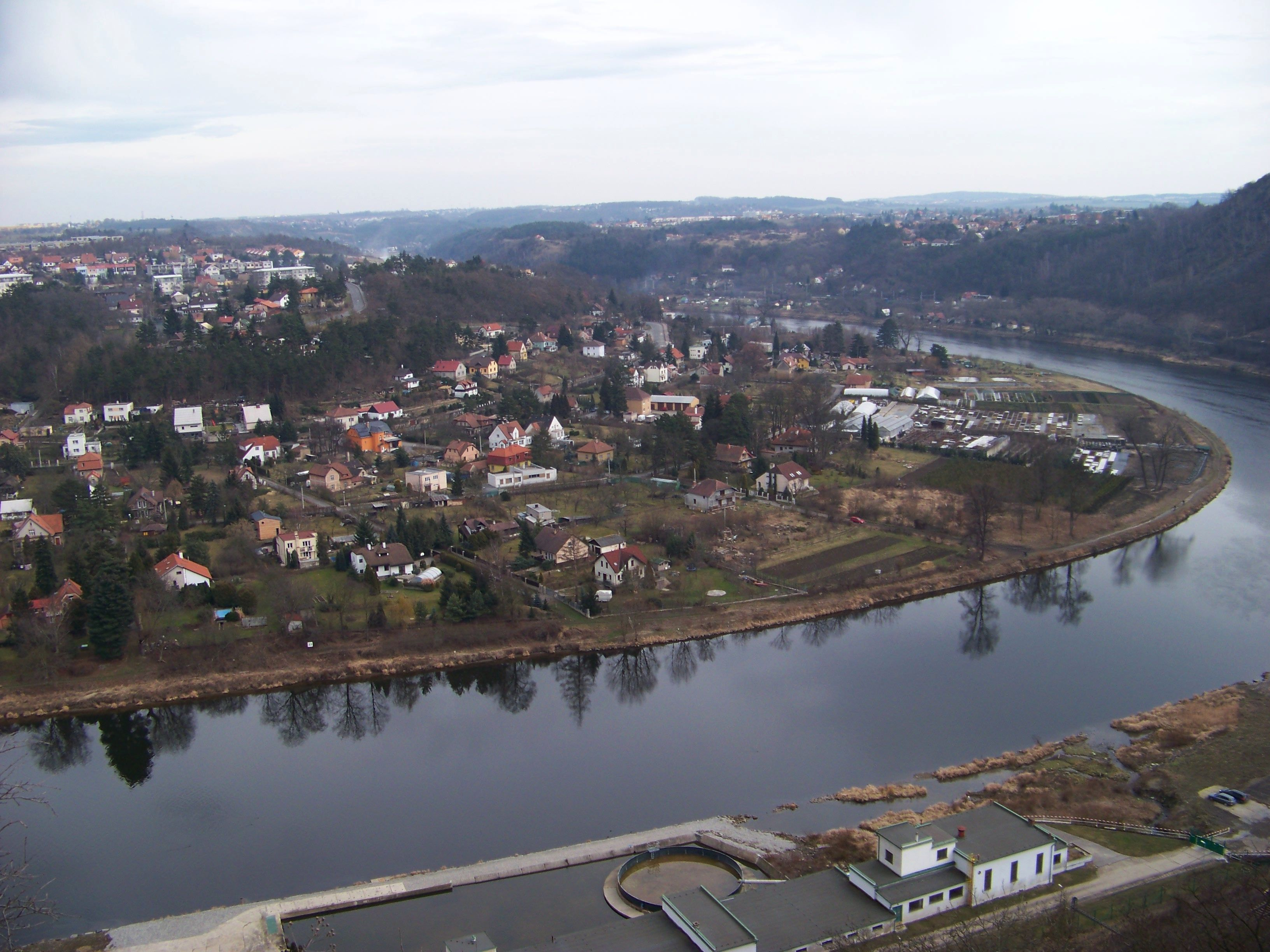
- Vltava in Husinec

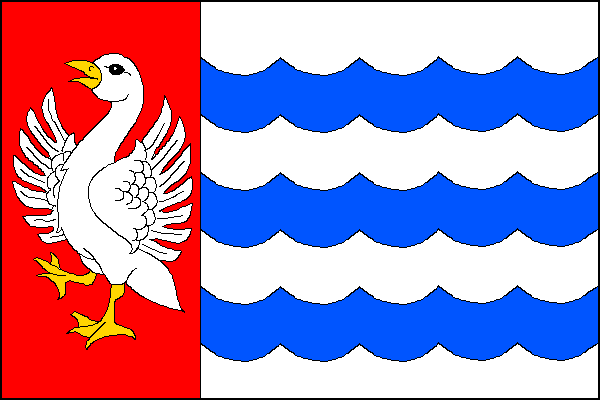
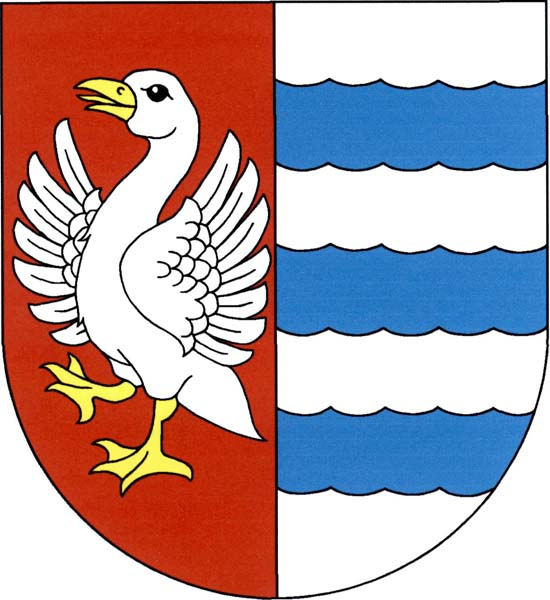
- Flag Coat of arms

- Location in the Czech Republic
- Coordinates: 50°10′26″N 14°22′31″E
- Country: Czech Republic
- Region: Central Bohemian
- District: Prague-East
- First mentioned: 1227

Area
  - Total: 2.97 km^{2} (1.15 sq mi)
- Elevation: 180 m (590 ft)

Population (2026-01-01)
  - Total: 1,578
  - Density: 531/km^{2} (1,380/sq mi)
- Time zone: UTC+1 (CET)
  - Summer (DST): UTC+2 (CEST)
- Postal code: 250 68
- Website: www.husinec-rez.cz

Husinec is a municipality and village in Prague-East District in the Central Bohemian Region of the Czech Republic. It has about 1,600 inhabitants. It lies on the Vltava River. The Nuclear Physics Institute of the Czech Academy of Sciences is located in Řež within the municipality.

== Administrative division ==
Husinec consists of two municipal parts (in brackets population according to the 2021 census):

- Husinec (226)
- Řež (1,375)

== Etymology ==
The name is derived from the Czech word husa (i.e. 'goose'), meaning "the dwelling of the geese". The naming of the settlement was most likely figurative.

== Geography ==
Husinec is located about 6 kilometres (4 mi) north of Prague. It lies in the Prague Plateau. It is situated in a meander of the Vltava River, partly in the valley of the river and partly on a promontory above the valley.

The municipality is known for high average temperatures, which are caused by the specific relief of the landscape and the natural conditions of the river valley. Drought-tolerant and heat-tolerant plants typical of subtropical climates thrive here. On 19 June 2022, the highest June temperature in the Czech Republic was recorded here, namely 39.0 °C (102.2 °F).

== History ==
The first written mention of Husinec is in a deed of King Ottokar I from 1227, Řež was first mentioned in a deed of Duke Vratislaus I from 1088.

The municipality was hit by the 2002 European floods.

== Demographics ==
Historical population

Year	Pop.	±%
1869	148	—
1880	125	−15.5%
1890	159	+27.2%
1900	164	+3.1%
1910	163	−0.6%

Year	Pop.	±%
1921	212	+30.1%
1930	421	+98.6%
1950	560	+33.0%
1961	755	+34.8%
1970	863	+14.3%

Year	Pop.	±%
1980	786	−8.9%
1991	814	+3.6%
2001	852	+4.7%
2011	1,390	+63.1%
2021	1,601	+15.2%

Source: Censuses

== Transport ==
The municipality is served by the train stration named Řež on the railway line from Prague to Kralupy nad Vltavou; however, this station is located on the other bank of the Vltava, outside the municipal territory.

== Science ==
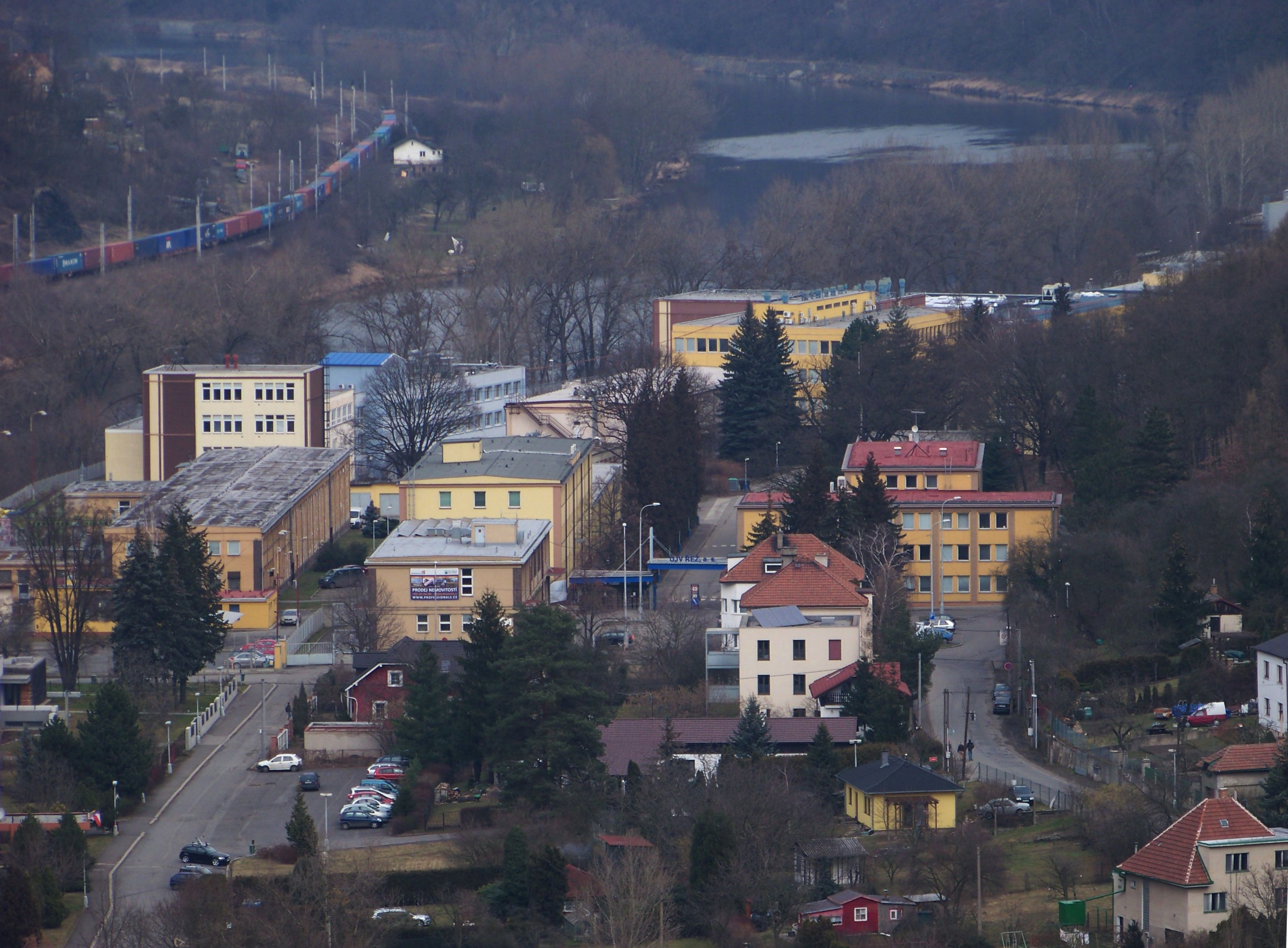
Nuclear Physics Institute of the CAS

The Nuclear Physics Institute of the Czech Academy of Sciences was established in Řež in 1955. Since 2007, it has been a public research institution.

== Sights ==
There are no protected cultural monuments in the municipality.
