= Řež =

- Village
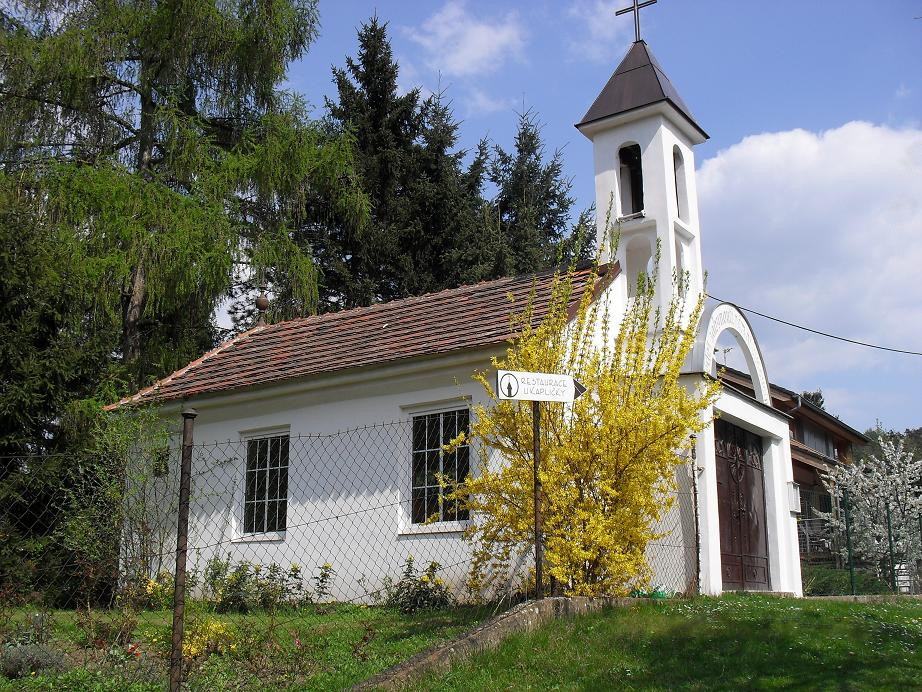
- Chapel of Saint Wenceslaus

- Location in the Czech Republic
- Coordinates: 50°10′21″N 14°21′41″E
- Country: Czech Republic
- Region: Central Bohemian
- District: Prague-East
- Municipality: Husinec
- First mentioned: 1088
- Elevation: 194 m (636 ft)

Population (2011)
  - Total: 1,221
- Time zone: UTC+1 (CET)
  - Summer (DST): UTC+2 (CEST)
- Postal code: 250 68

Řež (Czech: [ˈr̝ɛʃ]) is a village and administrative part of Husinec in the Central Bohemian Region of the Czech Republic.

Řež is the site of a nuclear research centre, where the first nuclear reactor in the republic was built under the guidance, of the first director of the center, Čestmír Šimáně.

Řež also has a chemical factory.

Řež has a railway connection by Prague - Kralupy nad Vltavou line. The stop is located on the opposite (left) bank of the Vltava River and is accessible by a pedestrian bridge.

On 19 June 2022 the highest ever temperature during the month of June in the Czech Republic was recorded here at 39.0 °C.

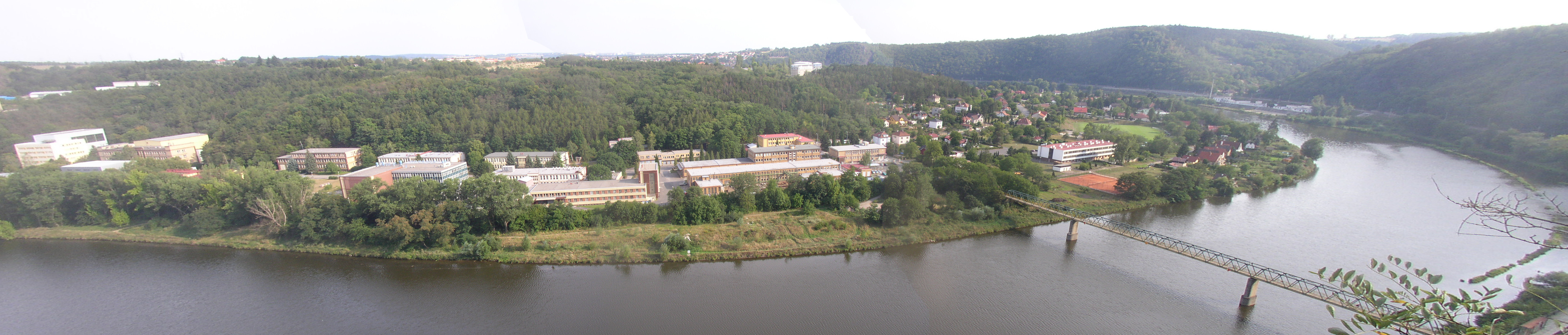
Panorama of Řež with nuclear research centre
