= Dalešice (Třebíč District) =

- Market town
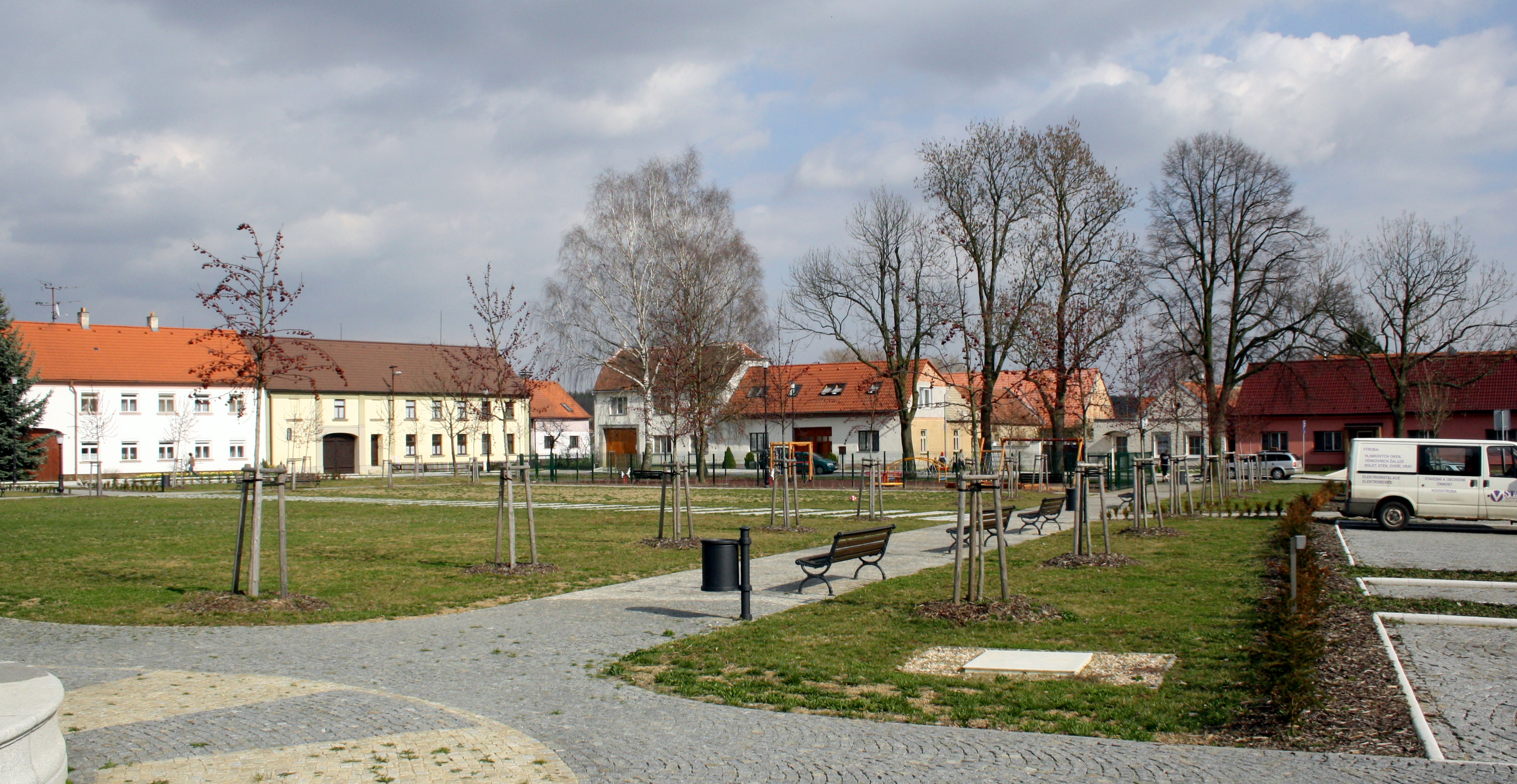
- Town square

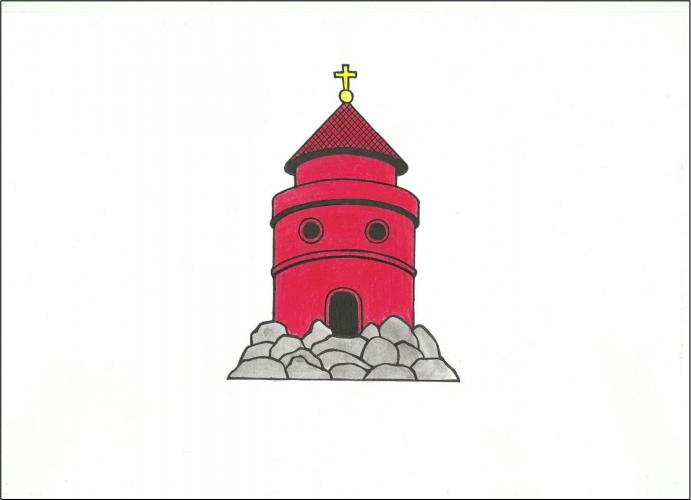
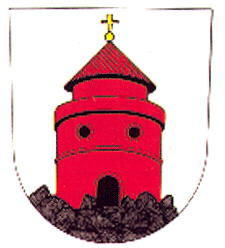
- Flag Coat of arms

- Location in the Czech Republic
- Coordinates: 49°7′45″N 16°4′55″E
- Country: Czech Republic
- Region: Vysočina
- District: Třebíč
- First mentioned: 1101

Area
  - Total: 11.38 km^{2} (4.39 sq mi)
- Elevation: 398 m (1,306 ft)

Population (2026-01-01)
  - Total: 567
  - Density: 49.8/km^{2} (129/sq mi)
- Time zone: UTC+1 (CET)
  - Summer (DST): UTC+2 (CEST)
- Postal code: 675 54
- Website: www.mestysdalesice.cz

Dalešice (Czech pronunciation: [ˈdalɛʃɪtsɛ]) is a market town in Třebíč District in the Vysočina Region of the Czech Republic. It has about 600 inhabitants.

== Geography ==
Dalešice is located about 17 kilometres (11 mi) southeast of Třebíč and 37 km (23 mi) west of Brno. It lies in the Jevišovice Uplands. The highest point is at 426 m (1,398 ft) above sea level.

Dalešice gave its name to the Dalešice Reservoir. Part of the reservoir forms the eastern border of the municipality.

== History ==
The first written mention of Dalešice is from 1101, when Duke Litolt donated the village to the newly established Benedictine monastery in Třebíč.

== Demographics ==
Historical population

| Year | Pop. | ±% |
|---|---|---|
| 1869 | 718 | — |
| 1880 | 786 | +9.5% |
| 1890 | 797 | +1.4% |
| 1900 | 778 | −2.4% |
| 1910 | 801 | +3.0% |

| Year | Pop. | ±% |
|---|---|---|
| 1921 | 844 | +5.4% |
| 1930 | 841 | −0.4% |
| 1950 | 705 | −16.2% |
| 1961 | 734 | +4.1% |
| 1970 | 644 | −12.3% |

| Year | Pop. | ±% |
|---|---|---|
| 1980 | 577 | −10.4% |
| 1991 | 492 | −14.7% |
| 2001 | 567 | +15.2% |
| 2011 | 568 | +0.2% |
| 2021 | 529 | −6.9% |

Source: Censuses

== Economy ==
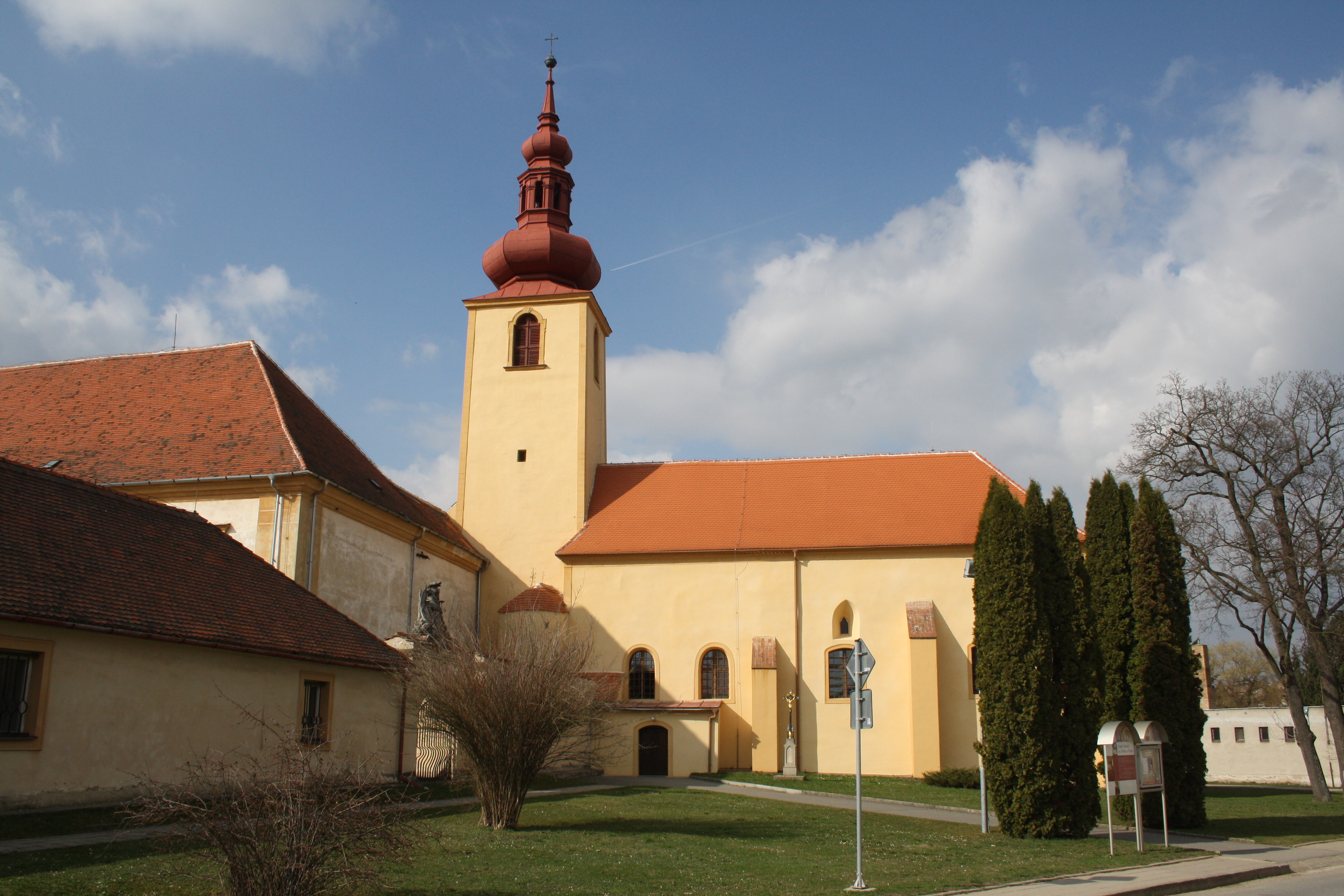
Church of Saints Peter and Paul

Dalešice is known for the Dalešice Brewery. The tradition of brewing beer dates back to the 17th century.

== Transport ==
There are no railways or major roads passing through the municipality.

== Sights ==
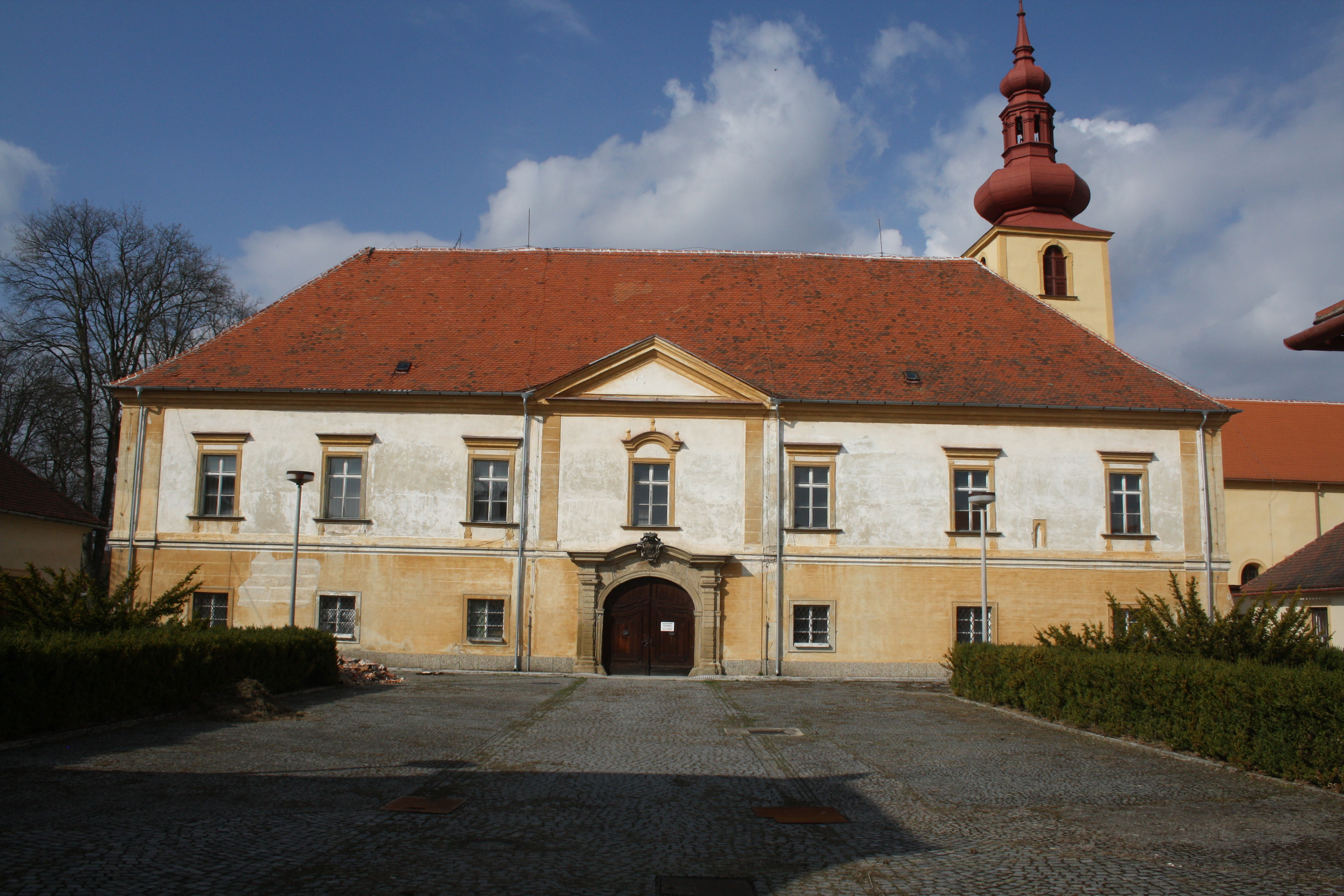
Dalešice Castle

The Church of Saints Peter and Paul is a Romanesque-Gothic building from the 12th century. Next to the church is a one-storey Baroque castle with a valuable sculptural decoration. The castle complex includes a park.

The brewery houses the Museum of Austro-Hungarian Brewing and offers tours of the operation.

== In popular culture ==
The film Cutting It Short was shot in the brewery.
