= Nuclear Physics Institute of the Czech Academy of Sciences =

Czech research institute

- Established: 1972, 1992
- Address: Hlavní 130, 25068 Husinec - Řež
- Location: Řež, Husinec, Czech Republic
- Website: http://www.ujf.cas.cz/index.php?lang=en

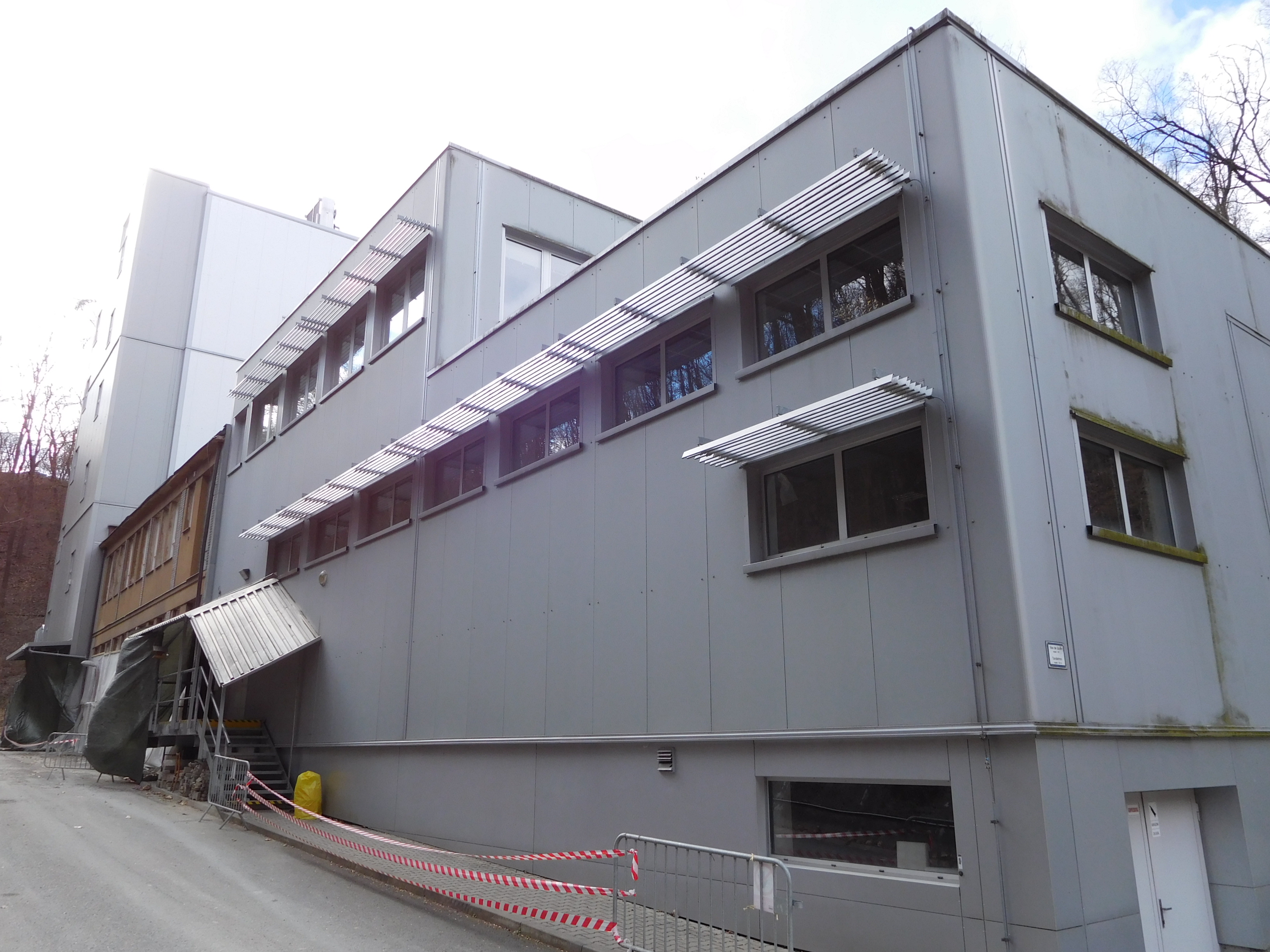
Tandetron building

The Nuclear Physics Institute of the Czech Academy of Sciences (Czech: Ústav Jaderné Fyziky Akademie věd ČR) is a public research institution located in Řež, Central Bohemian Region, Czech Republic. It was established in 1972 from the Physics Section of the former institute of Nuclear Research of the Czechoslovak Academy of Sciences.

== History ==
In 1955 the Nuclear Research Institute CSAS (originally called the Nuclear Physics Institute of the Czechoslovak Academy of Sciences) was founded as a basic institution for nuclear research. As the nuclear power industry developed in the Czech Republic, the institute was in 1972 divided into several parts. The largest part was subsided to the Czechoslovak Commission for Atomic Energy under the name Nuclear Research Institute and later privatized. The second largest part the Nuclear Physics Institute of the CAS remains under the Academy of Sciences. Former Institute of Radiation Dosimetry CAS in Prague was connected to NPI as a detached branch in 1994.

== Research ==
Primary focus of the institute is nuclear physics, both theoretical and experimental. It carries out studies in the nuclear spectroscopy of beta and gamma radiation, nuclear reactions including the collisions of heavy ions and hyper-nuclear physics. Its work is also focused on related fields, such as the study of the solid phase using neutron scattering, mathematical physics and theoretical subnuclear physics.

== Departments ==
- Director's Office
- Technical and Economic Administration
- Department of Theoretical Physics
- Department of Nuclear Spectroscopy
- Department of Nuclear Reactions
- Department of Neutron Physics
- Department of Radiopharmaceuticals
- Department of Radiation Dosimetry
- Department of Accelerators

== Isochronous cyclotron U-120M ==
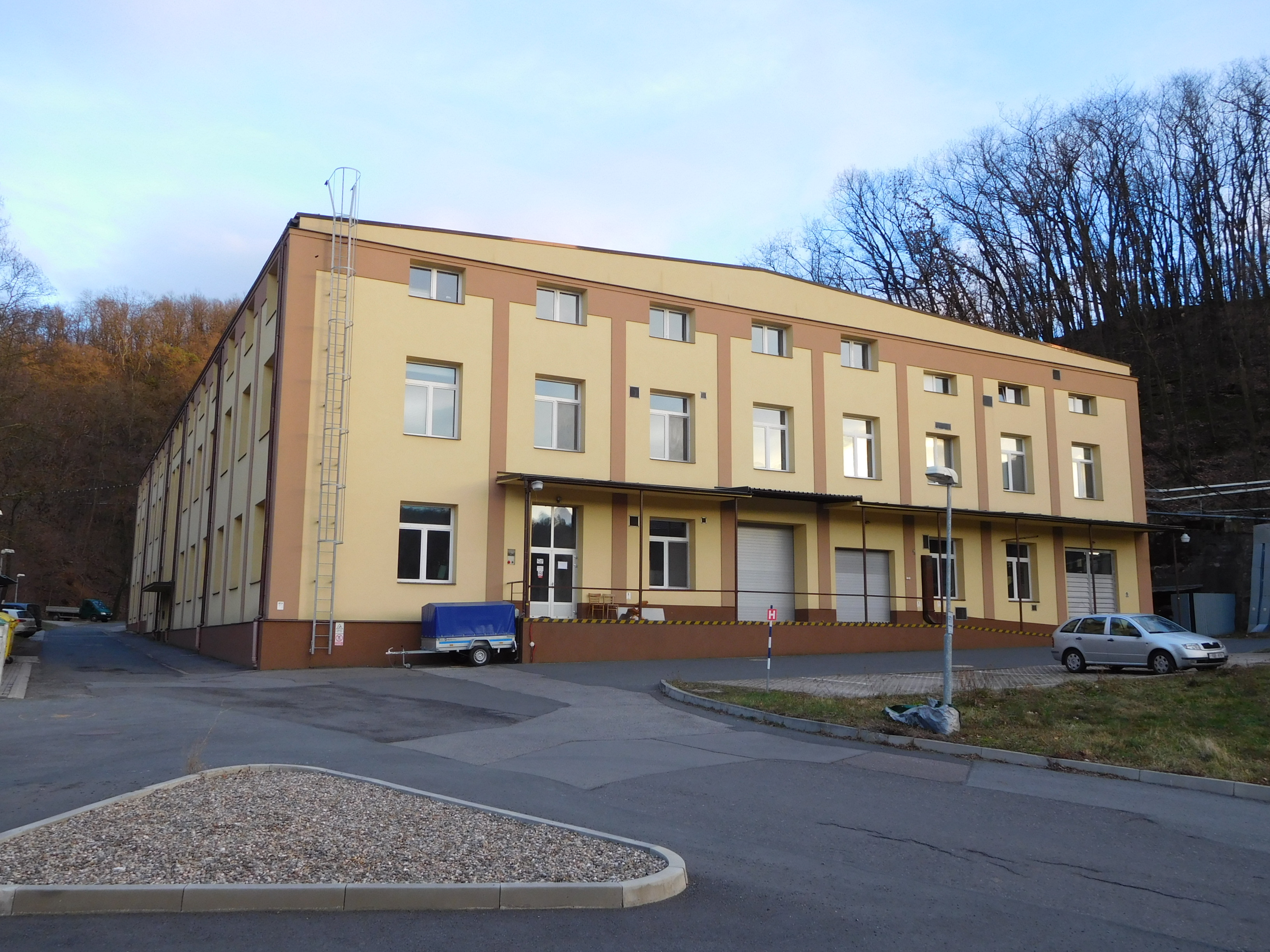
Cyclotron building

Isochronous cyclotron U-120M is the primary experimental facility of the institute and it is the only cyclotron in the Czech Republic. It has been operating since 1977. The cyclotron is used both for fundamental research and applications. It can accelerate ions within the range of the mass-to-charge ratio A/q = 1 - 2.8. The present internal radial ion source is suitable for acceleration of H^+, D^+, 4-He^+2 and 3-He^+2. Maximum proton energy is 36 MeV, and the maximum energy for heavier ions is given by 40 q^2/A MeV. Currents of an internal beam of protons and deuterons can reach 100 microA, and for extracted beams 5 microA. Particles are extracted from the cyclotron chamber by means of a 3-section deflection electrostatic system to the entrance of the beam lines.
