= Tetov =

- Municipality
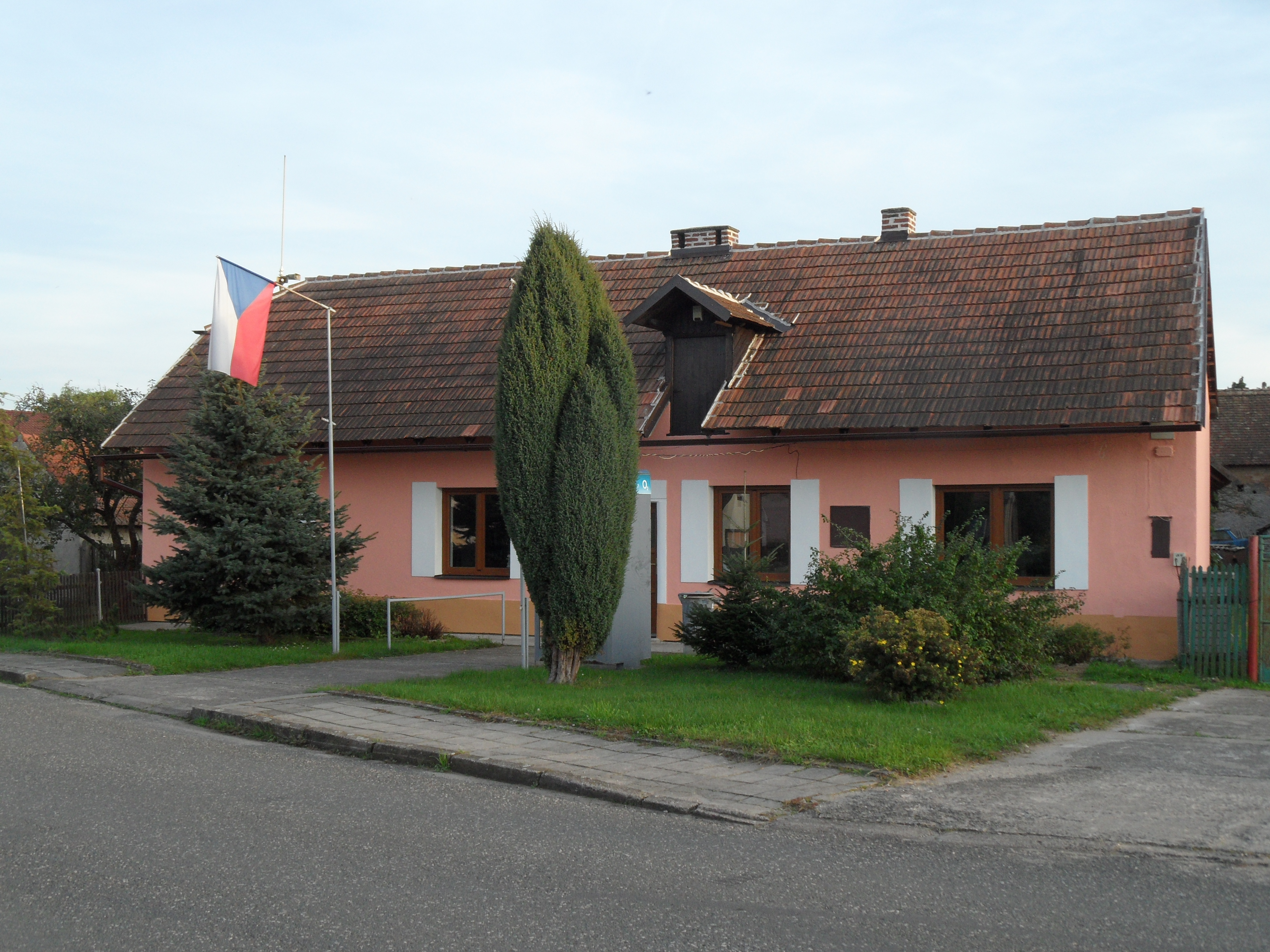
- Municipal office

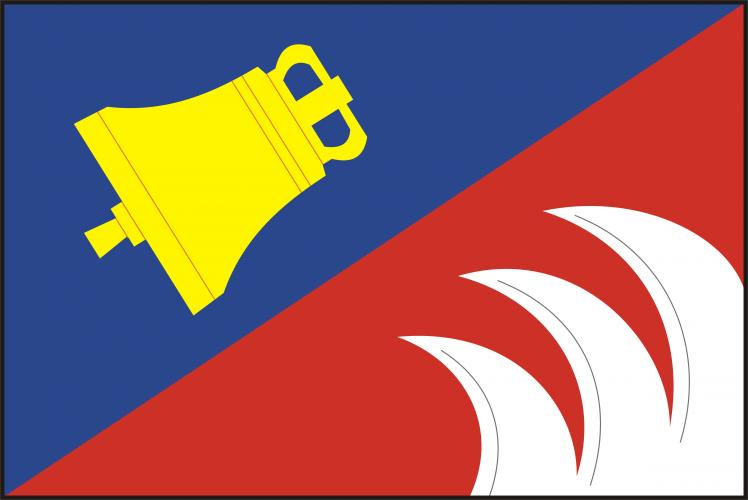
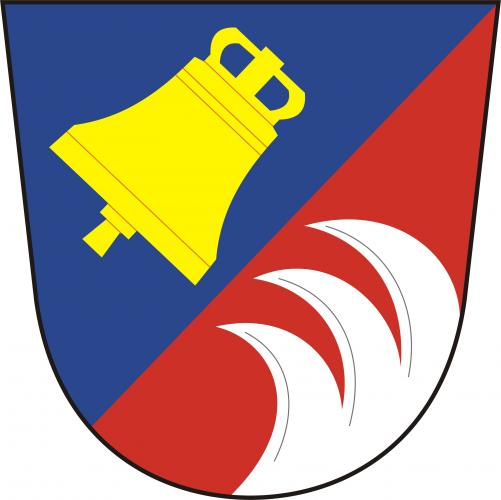
- Flag Coat of arms

- Location in the Czech Republic
- Coordinates: 50°4′50″N 15°26′45″E
- Country: Czech Republic
- Region: Pardubice
- District: Pardubice
- Founded: 1791

Area
  - Total: 4.62 km^{2} (1.78 sq mi)
- Elevation: 212 m (696 ft)

Population (2026-01-01)
  - Total: 163
  - Density: 35.3/km^{2} (91.4/sq mi)
- Time zone: UTC+1 (CET)
  - Summer (DST): UTC+2 (CEST)
- Postal code: 533 16
- Website: www.tetov.cz

Tetov is a municipality and village in Pardubice District in the Pardubice Region of the Czech Republic. It has about 200 inhabitants.

== Demographics ==
Historical population
Year	Pop.	±%
1869	307	—
1880	323	+5.2%
1890	343	+6.2%
1900	334	−2.6%
1910	376	+12.6%
1921	394	+4.8%
1930	375	−4.8%
1950	283	−24.5%
1961	326	+15.2%
1970	278	−14.7%
1980	248	−10.8%
1991	182	−26.6%
2001	156	−14.3%
2011	161	+3.2%
2021	177	+9.9%
Source: Censuses
