= Čestmír Šimáně =

Czech nuclear physicist and educator (1919–2012)

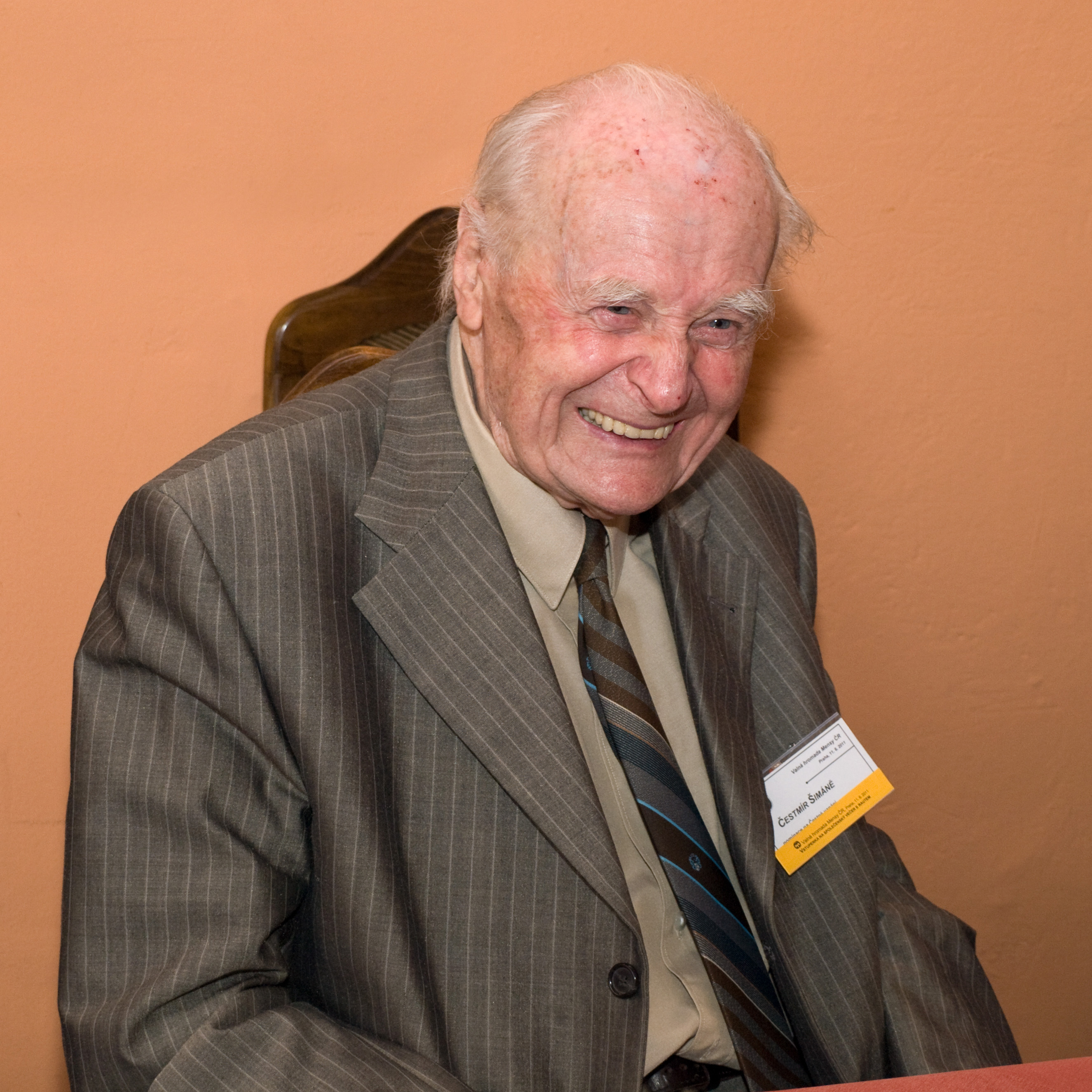
- Čestmír Šimáně in 2011
- Born: Čestmír Šimáně; 9 May 1919; Opava, Czechoslovakia
- Died: 26 July 2012 (aged 93); Czech Republic
- Occupations: pedagogue, physicist and publicist

Academic background
- Education: Brno University of Technology

Čestmír Šimáně (9 May 1919, Opava – 26 July 2012) was Czech nuclear physicist and educator. He was the founder of nuclear research in the Czech Republic.

He was director of the Institute Physics of the Czechoslovak Academy of Sciences. From 1955, he was the first director of the newly founded Institute of Nuclear Physics in Řež, where he was in charge of the construction of the first nuclear reactor in the country.

He was also an initiator of the construction of the first Czechoslovak particle accelerator, Microtron MT25.

In 1964, he began lecturing at the Department of Nuclear and Physical Engineering of the Czech Technical University in Prague, where he was the dean from 1967 to 1972. He worked at this department for a total of forty years.
