= Dukovany Nuclear Power Station =

Power plant in the Czech Republic

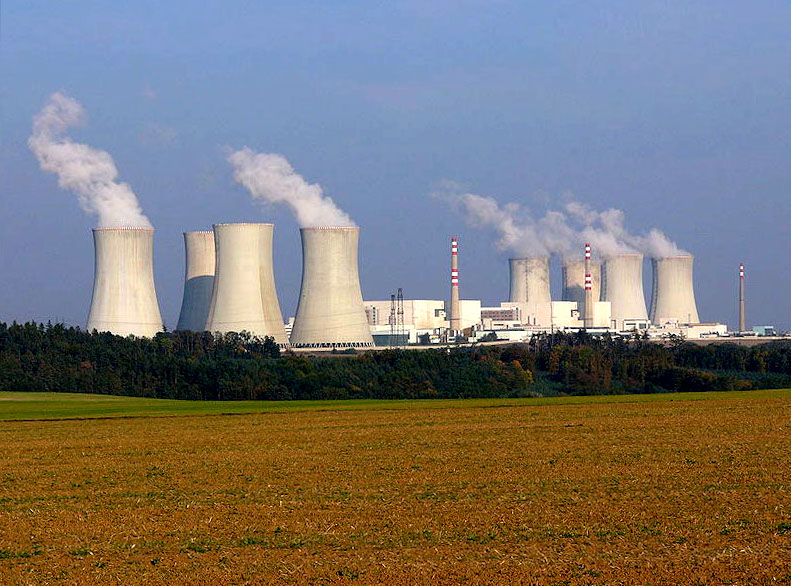
- Dukovany nuclear power station
- Country: Czech Republic
- Coordinates: 49°5′6″N 16°8′56″E
- Status: Operational
- Construction began: 1974
- Commission date: 1985
- Construction cost: Kčs 25 billion
- Owner: ČEZ Group
- Operator: ČEZ Group

Nuclear power station
- Reactor type: VVER-440

Power generation
- Units operational: 4 × 510 MW
- Nameplate capacity: 1,878 MW
- Capacity factor: 76.2%
- Annual net output: 12,543 GW·h

External links
- Website: Official website
- Commons: Related media on Commons

The Dukovany Nuclear Power Station (Czech: Jaderná elektrárna Dukovany) is a nuclear power plant near Dukovany in the Czech Republic.

It was the second nuclear power plant in Czechoslovakia (the Bohunice Nuclear Power Plant in what is now Slovakia was constructed in 1958), and the first one in what is now the Czech Republic. It is situated 30 kilometres (19 mi) from the town of Třebíč, near the Dalešice Reservoir, where the plant sources its water supply. In 1970 Czechoslovakia and the Soviet Union ratified a contract for construction of two nuclear power plants. Actual construction work began four years later. From 1985 to 1987, four power units with pressurized water reactors were commissioned. All four are still in operation.

Dukovany nuclear power plant supplies approximately 14 TWh of electric energy annually to the national power network. The plant is owned and operated by ČEZ Group. The power plant modernisation will successively be carried out to the end of its planned service life.

== Plant characteristics ==
The plant has four reactors. As of 31 December 2011 ČEZ reported turbine generator output (gross capacity) as listed below. Net capacity is a baseline estimate only.

Unit	Type	Net capacity	Gross capacity	Initial criticality	Grid date	Shutdown
1	VVER-440/213	475 MWe	510 MWe	Feb 1985	Aug 1985	2065 (expected)
2	VVER-440/213	475 MWe	510 MWe	Jan 1986	Sep 1986	2066 (expected)
3	VVER-440/213	475 MWe	510 MWe	Oct 1986	May 1987	2067 (expected)
4	VVER-440/213	475 MWe	510 MWe	Jun 1987	Dec 1987	2067 (expected)

In 2005, Unit 3 was upgraded to 456 MWe gross capacity, and the same upgrade was made to Unit 1 and Unit 4 in 2007. Unit 3 was further upgraded in 2009 to 500MWe. In total an extra 240 MWe of capacity has been or will be added before 2013 in a comprehensive program of improvements including steam plant replacement, addition of instrumentation and fuel changes.

The reactors are fuelled by uranium dioxide UO_{2}. Fuel is placed in the reactor in 312 fuel assemblies. Each assembly consists of 126 fuel rods with a hermetically sealed fuel.

Dukovany Nuclear Power Station has 8 cooling towers, each 125 metres tall. In 1994, a visitor information centre was opened at the site.

West of the facility there is a 136-metre-tall (446 ft) guyed tower for monitoring air radioactivity. In 2025 the dismantling of a 1970s 100-metre-tall (330 ft) gas flue chimney of an auxiliary boiler predating the reactors started.

In 2023, ČEZ planned to invest more than CZK2.3 billion ($105 million) mainly to ensure "safe and reliable operation until at least 2047" with a lifetime of at least 60 years. The units are also switching to a 16-month fuel replacement cycle from the current 12-month cycle.

In addition to four reactor units, the Dukovany Nuclear Power Station complex includes two other nuclear facilities, a low- and medium-level radioactive waste storage facility, and two spent nuclear fuel storage facilities with a total capacity of 194 fuel assemblies.

== Power distribution ==
The power lines leaving Dukovany Nuclear Power Station are mainly installed on delta type pylons. They run to Slavetice substation situated at 49°6'15" N and 16°7'10" E. At this substation the powerline to Dürnrohr in Austria starts.

Plant owner ČEZ plans to install a district heating circuit to supply heat to homes and businesses in Brno. A pipeline over 40 kilometres in length could be installed after regional officials have considered ČEZ's environmental impact statement for the project, submitted in July 2010.

== Replacement by two APR1000 reactors ==
In 2019 the Czech government gave preliminary approval for at least one new nuclear power unit for about 2035 to replace the four units expected to shut down between 2035 and 2037. The financial model proposed is a state guarantee so finance can be obtained at government interest rates, but no subsidy on operating costs or above market-price electricity rates. In January 2021 Chinese companies were excluded from bidding for political and security reasons, following advice from the security services of EU and NATO member states. In April 2021, it was announced that Russia's Rosatom would be excluded as well, after it has been alleged that two Russian agents were perpetrators of the 2014 Vrbětice ammunition warehouses explosions.

In June 2021, the Czech Ministry of Industry and Trade invited Électricité de France (EDF), Westinghouse and Korea Hydro & Nuclear Power (KHNP) to participate in a pre-qualification round for a new unit at the Dukovany Nuclear Power Station. EDF proposed a 1200 MWe version of the EPR for the project, named the EPR-1200. On 31 October 2023, the three companies delivered bids for AP1000, APR1000 and EPR-1200 reactors respectively. The bids were evaluated with the aim of construction starting in 2029 with first trial operation in 2036.

In 2024, the Czech government selected South Korea's Korea Hydro & Nuclear Power (KHNP) to construct two APR1000 reactors at the Dukovany site, each with a capacity of 1,055 megawatts. This decision is part of the country's long-term strategy to increase the share of nuclear energy to up to 50% of national electricity production by 2050. Estimated at $18 billion, the Dukovany expansion represents the largest energy investment in Czech history. The project is being overseen by the state-owned energy company ČEZ, with the government holding an 80% stake in the subsidiary responsible for the new reactors. In January 2025, a preliminary agreement was signed with KHNP; however, in May 2025, the signing of the final contract was temporarily paused due to a legal challenge from the French company EDF, a competing bidder. The delay is procedural, pending judicial review. Despite this, the Czech government remains committed to the project, with trial operations of the first new reactor expected by 2036 and the second by 2038.

In April 2024, the European Commission (EC) decided to reduce state aid for the Dukovany NPP in the form of a contract for difference by at least 80%: shortening the duration of this financial instrument from the 60 years proposed by the Czech government to 40 years and limiting the volume of electricity sold under the contract from 100% (the government's proposal) to a maximum of 30% (the remaining at least 70% of electricity must be sold on market terms). Later in May the EC asked the Czech government to delay signing the contract, citing concerns over the tender process and potential legal issues. This has sparked criticism from Czech industry leaders, who argue that postponing the deal could harm the country's energy security and economic interests.

EDF challenged the decision on the basis the bid was "unfeasible without illegal state aid", however the Supreme Administrative Court of the Czech Republic rejected the challenge. In December 2025, the European Commission launched an inquiry into the funding plan.

In October 2026, KHNP announced that their joint cooperation agreement with the Daewoo-Doosan consortium, who had participated in the bidding process, would be terminated after they failed to agree terms. KHNP expected a replacement contractor would be agreed by July 2027. The two reactors are expected to be completed in 2039 and 2040.

== Popular culture ==
The Dukovany reactor complex appears in the video game Tom Clancy's EndWar as a potential battlefield.

== See also ==
- Nuclear power in the Czech Republic
- Energy in the Czech Republic
- Temelín Nuclear Power Station - another nuclear power plant in the Czech Republic
- Dalešice Reservoir - nearby reservoir that supplies cooling water and the Dalešice Hydro Power Plant
