= Dalešice Hydro Power Plant =

Upgraded Czech dam

Dalešice Reservoir
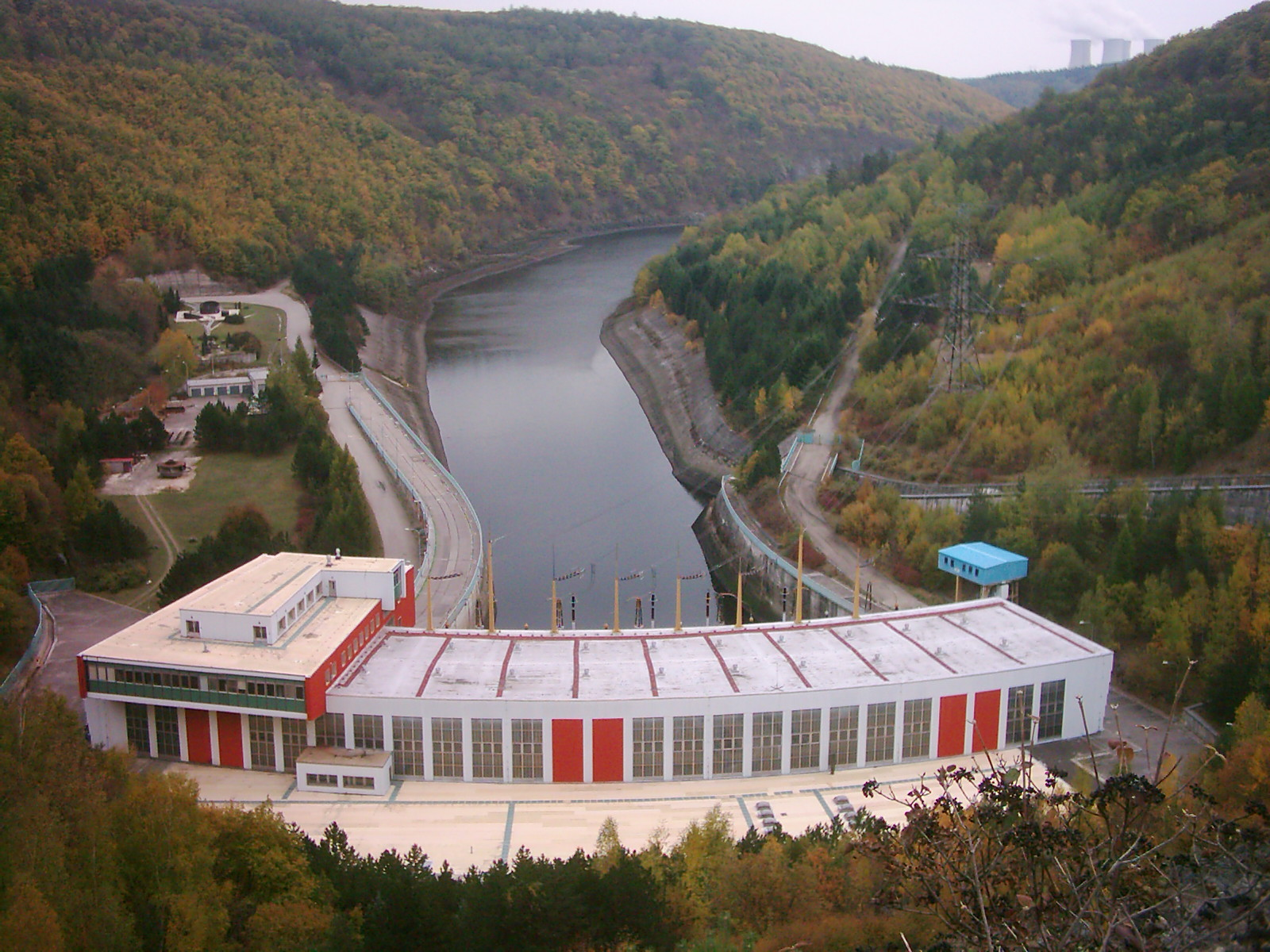
- Dam with pumped-storage plant

- Location within Czech Republic
- Location: Třebíč District
- Coordinates: 49°07′30″N 16°07′17″E
- Type: reservoir
- Primary inflows: Jihlava River
- Primary outflows: Jihlava River
- Basin countries: Czech Republic
- Surface area: 463 hectares (1,140 acres)
- Max. depth: 85.5 m (281 ft)
- Water volume: 127.3×10^{6} m^{3} (4.50×10^{9} cu ft)

Dalešice Hydro Power Plant (Czech: Přečerpávací vodní elektrárna Dalešice) is a power plant on the Jihlava River in the Czech Republic. It has four Francis turbines with a nominal capacity of 120 megawatts (160,000 hp) each and a total capacity of 480 megawatts (640,000 hp). The old turbines before the 1999–2007 reconstruction had a capacity of 112.5 megawatts (150,900 hp) each. The plant includes the lower Dalešice-Mohelno Reservoir of the Dalešice-Mohelno pump-dam complex.

== Dalešice Reservoir ==
Dalešice Reservoir lies in Třebíč District in the Czech Republic and is named after the market town of Dalešice. It was built between 1970 and 1978 together with the Mohelno Reservoir as a water source for the nearby Dukovany Nuclear Power Station. As it has the fastest-starting turbines of all dams in the Czech Republic (less than 1 minute to full power) it also acts as emergency source in case some of the reactors in Dukovany shut down (for that reason it was also initially equipped with total capacity of 450 MW to back-up one of the four 440MWe VVER440 reactors). Thanks to the turbine capability to act as pumps, it also plays significant balancing role for distributing network when it pumps water back to the higher reservoir during the night and uses it again to produce electricity during the daily consumption peaks. The gravity dam is 100 metres (330 ft) high (the highest in the Czech Republic, second-highest rockfill dam in Europe), so the reservoir is also the deepest in the Czech Republic 85.5 metres (281 ft). The reservoir has a capacity of 127.3 million cubic metres (4.50×10^{9} cu ft).

== Mohelno Reservoir ==
The Mohelno Reservoir is through-flow dam, acting as the lower reservoir of the Dalešice-Mohelno pump-dam complex. The gravity concrete dam is 185 metres (607 ft) long, 7.75/32 m wide and 38.65 m tall. It creates 7-km-long lake and has total capacity of 17.1 million cubic metres (600×10^{6} cu ft). It includes single Kaplan turbine (1.2 MW) and single Francis turbine (0.6 MW). In case of total blackout, the Mohelno turbines can jumpstart the Dalešice Francis turbines and together start the Dukovany NPP. Thanks to this, the whole Dalešice-Dukovany complex is certified for fully autonomous operation independent of the external distribution network.
