= Bohunice =

Bohunice may refer to places:

== Czech Republic ==
- Bohunice (Prachatice District), a municipality and village in the South Bohemian Region
- Bohunice, a village and part of Všemyslice in the South Bohemian Region
- Brno-Bohunice, a district of Brno

== Slovakia ==
- Bohunice, Ilava District
- Bohunice, Levice District
- Jaslovské Bohunice
  - Bohunice Nuclear Power Plant in the municipality
