= Temelín =

- Municipality
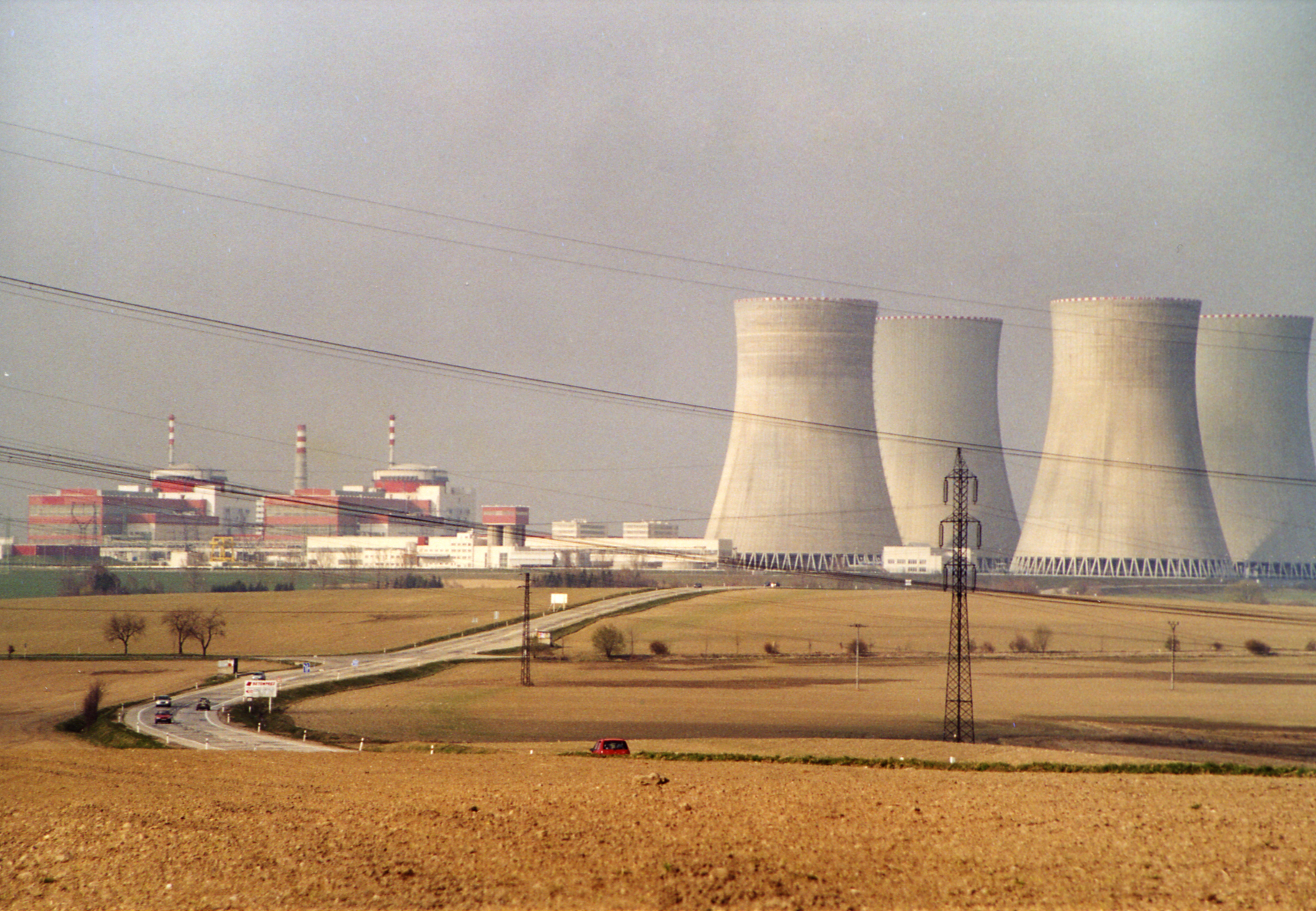
- Temelín Nuclear Power Station

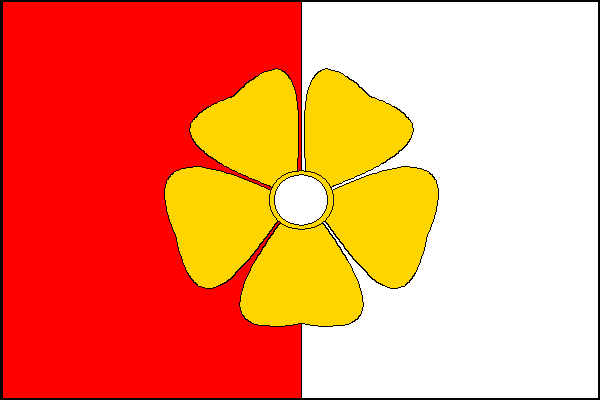
- Flag Coat of arms

- Location in the Czech Republic
- Coordinates: 49°11′34″N 14°20′56″E
- Country: Czech Republic
- Region: South Bohemian
- District: České Budějovice
- First mentioned: 1381

Area
  - Total: 50.40 km^{2} (19.46 sq mi)
- Elevation: 443 m (1,453 ft)

Population (2026-01-01)
  - Total: 916
  - Density: 18.2/km^{2} (47.1/sq mi)
- Time zone: UTC+1 (CET)
  - Summer (DST): UTC+2 (CEST)
- Postal codes: 373 01, 375 01
- Website: www.obectemelin.cz

Temelín (Czech pronunciation: [tɛmɛliːn], German: Groß Temelin) is a municipality and village in České Budějovice District in the South Bohemian Region of the Czech Republic. It has about 900 inhabitants. It is known for the Temelín Nuclear Power Station.

== Administrative division ==
Temelín consists of 11 municipal parts (in brackets population according to the 2021 census):

- Temelín (366)
- Březí u Týna nad Vltavou (0)
- Knín (4)
- Kočín (76)
- Křtěnov (0)
- Lhota pod Horami (125)
- Litoradlice (49)
- Podhájí (0)
- Sedlec (51)
- Temelínec (0)
- Zvěrkovice (86)

== Etymology ==
The name Temelín is derived from the personal name Temela.

== Geography ==
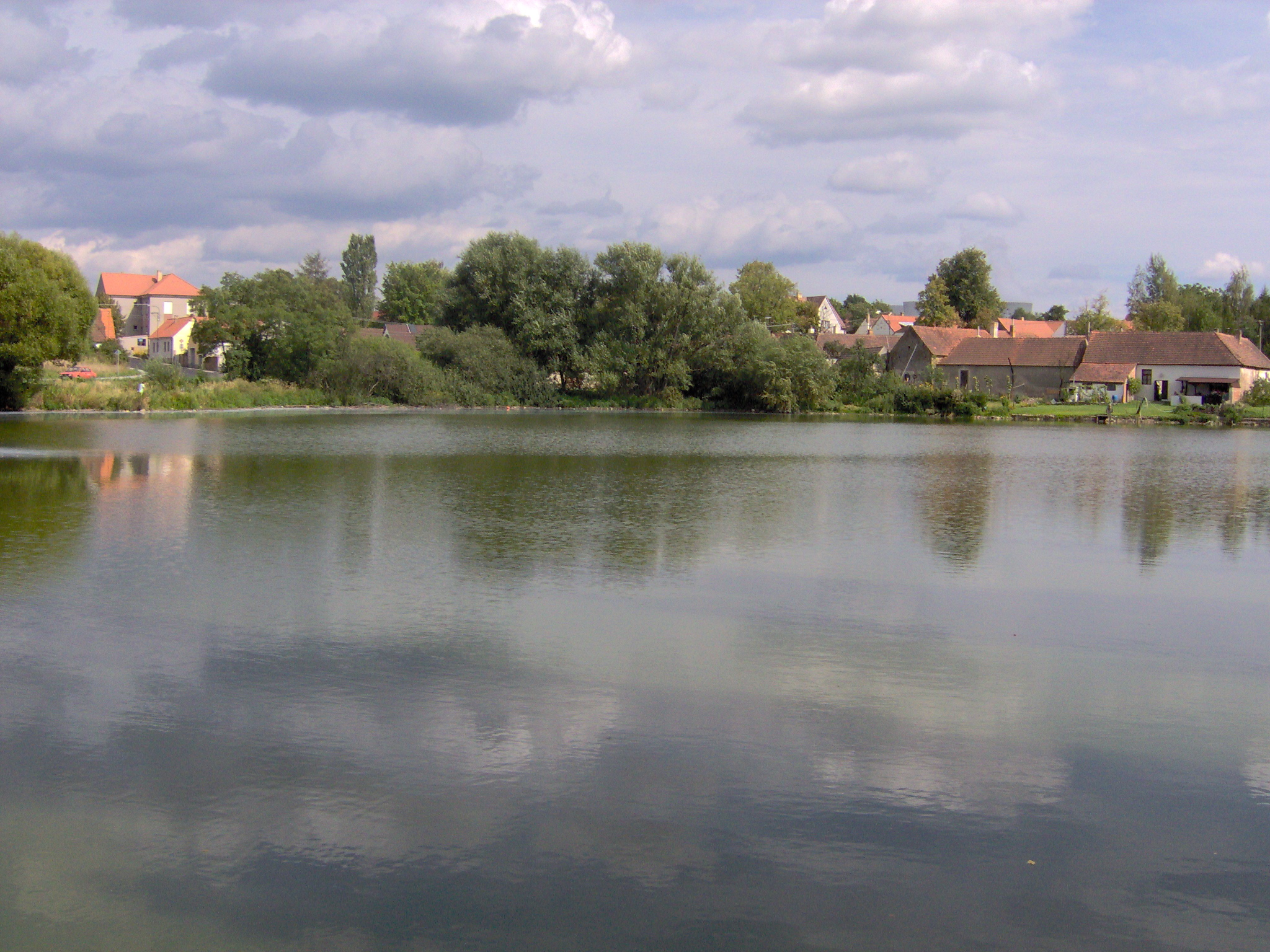
The fishpond Panský rybník

Temelín is located about 25 kilometres (16 mi) north of České Budějovice. It lies mostly in the Tábor Uplands, only the western part of the municipal territory with the villages of Lhota pod Horami and Sedlec lies in the České Budějovice Basin. The highest point is a nameless hill at 525 m (1,722 ft) above sea level. The eastern municipal border is formed by the Vltava River and by the Hněvkovice Reservoir, built on the Vltava. The territory of Temelín is rich in small fishponds.

== History ==
The first written mention of Temelín is from 1381. From 1482 until the establishment of an independent municipality in 1850, it was a part of the Neznašov estate.

In the 1980s, the villages of Březí u Týna nad Vltavou, Knín, Křtěnov and Temelínec were demolished for the construction of the Temelín Nuclear Power Station.

== Demographics ==
Historical population

Year	Pop.	±%
1869	2,920	—
1880	2,934	+0.5%
1890	2,823	−3.8%
1900	2,776	−1.7%
1910	2,772	−0.1%

Year	Pop.	±%
1921	2,741	−1.1%
1930	2,520	−8.1%
1950	2,031	−19.4%
1961	2,012	−0.9%
1970	1,811	−10.0%

Year	Pop.	±%
1980	1,546	−14.6%
1991	751	−51.4%
2001	714	−4.9%
2011	795	+11.3%
2021	757	−4.8%

Source: Censuses

== Economy ==
Temelín Nuclear Power Station, one of the two Czech nuclear power plants, is located in the municipality.

== Transport ==
A railway runs through the municipal territory, but there is no passenger transport.

== Sights ==
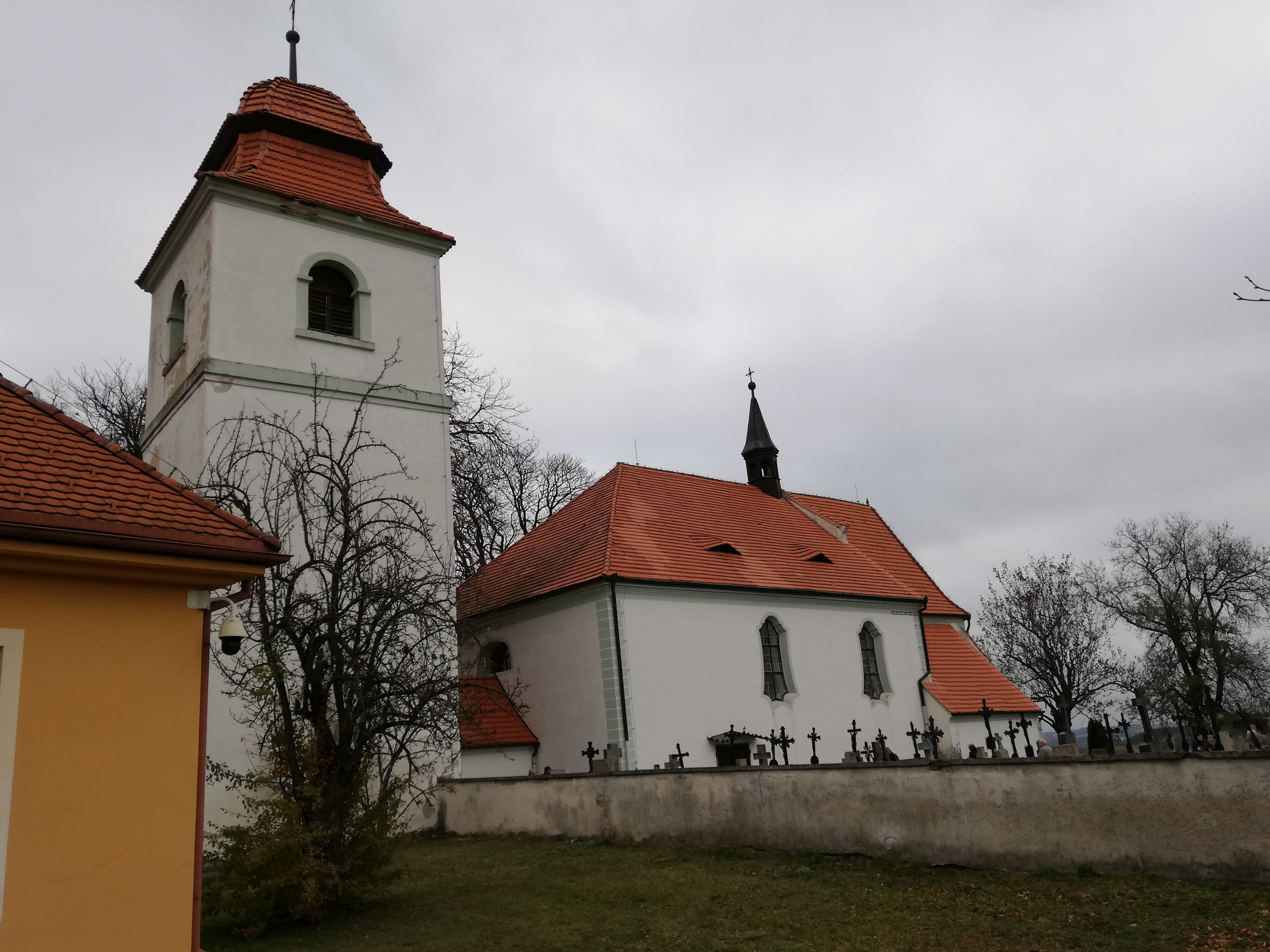
Church of Saint Procopius

The main historical landmark of the municipality is the Church of Saint Procopius. It was built in the Gothic style around 1300. In the 18th century, it was partially rebuilt and modified in the Baroque style. Next to the church is a separate bell tower from the 16th century. The church is the last remnant of the abandoned village of Křtěnov.

The Vysoký Hrádek Castle is located next to the nuclear power station, in the area of Březí u Týna nad Vltavou. It is a Renaissance castle that houses the information centre of the nuclear power station.

The Býšov Fortress is located in the area of Knín. It dates from the 14th century.

In the centre of Temelín is a chapel from around 1905.

== Gallery ==
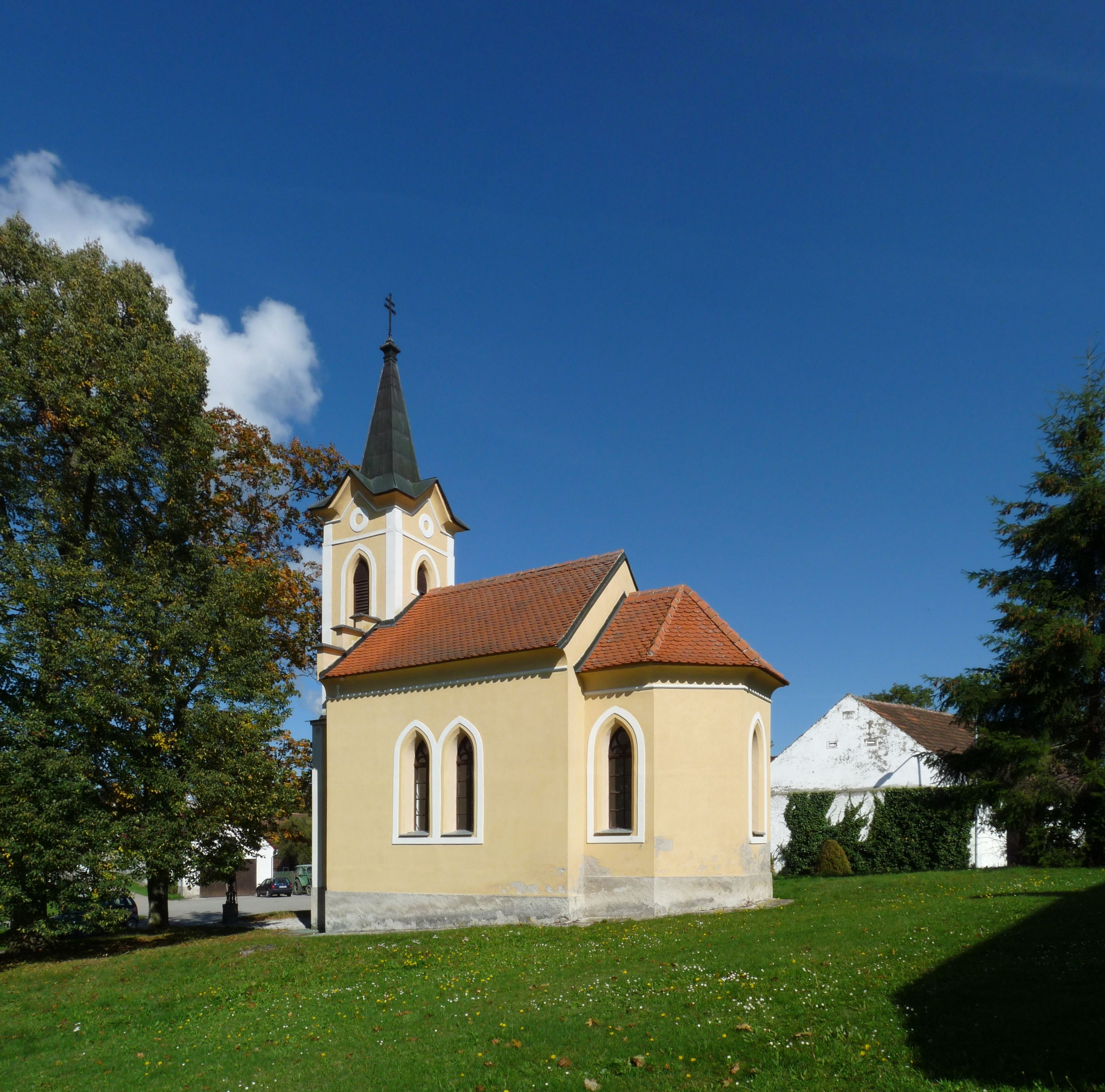
Chapel of Saint Procopius in Kočín

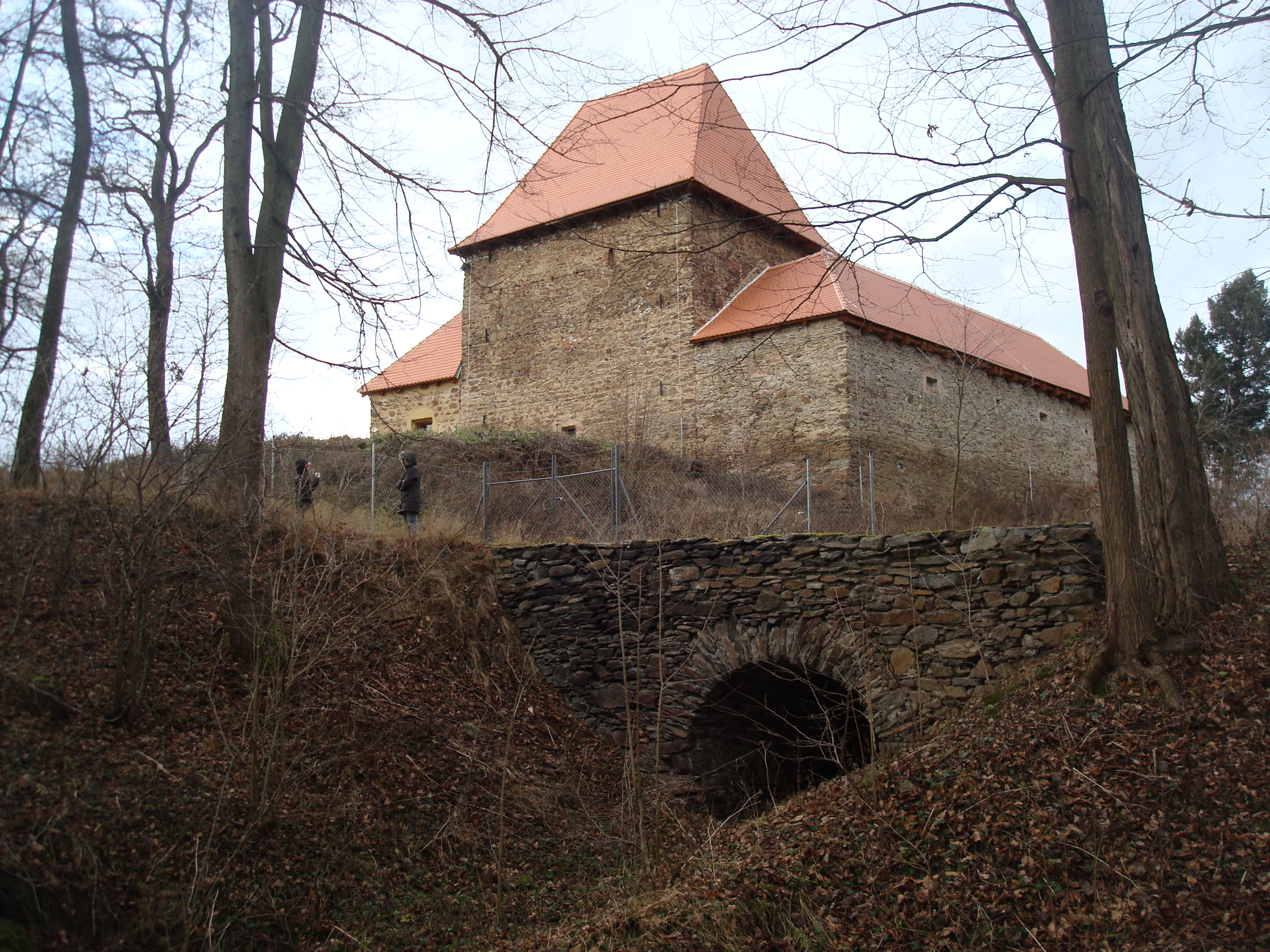
Býšov fortress in Knín

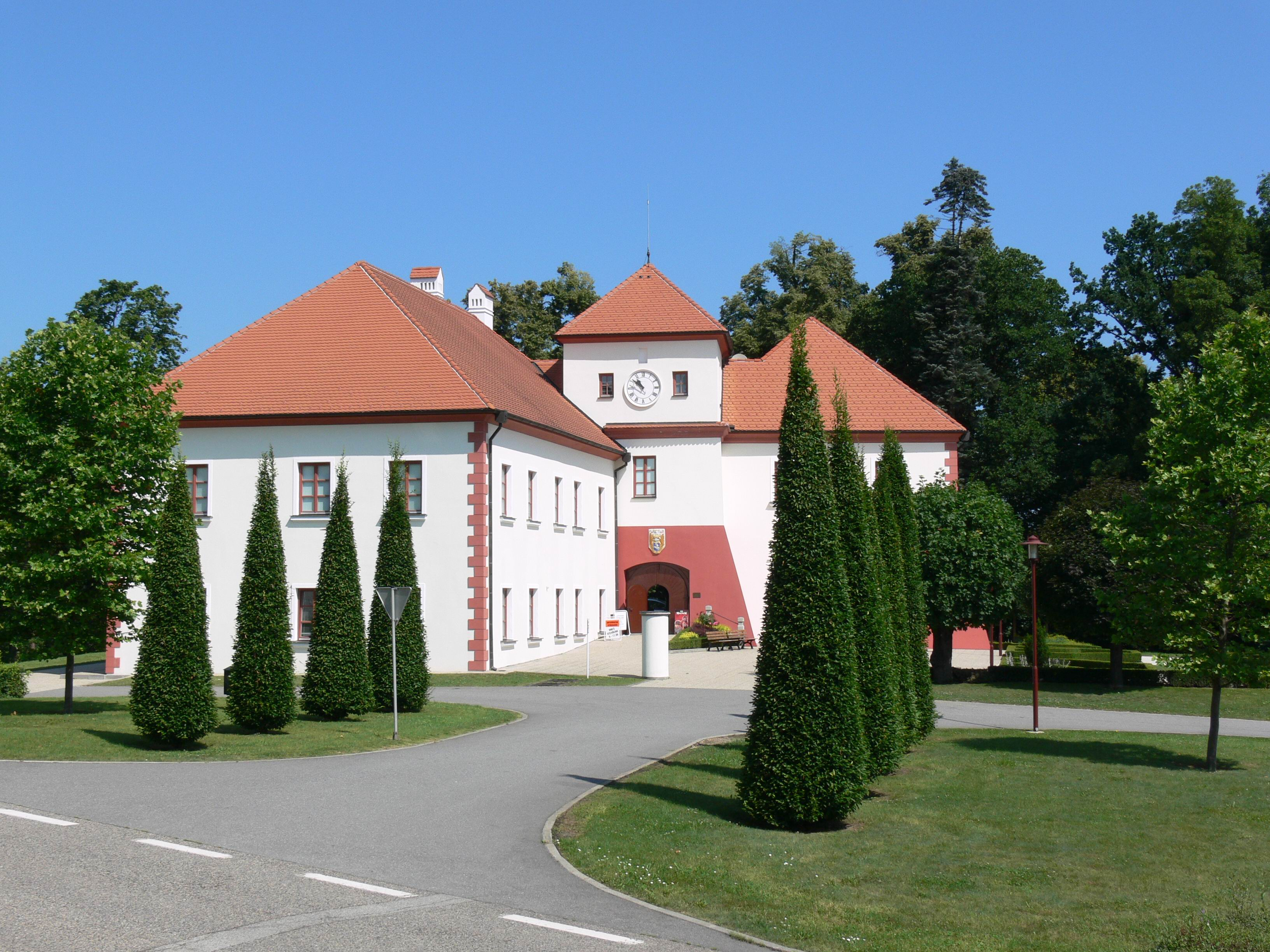
Vysoký Hrádek Castle

== See also ==
- Dukovany, the second Czech municipality with a nuclear power station
