= Temelín Nuclear Power Station =

Power plant in the Czech Republic

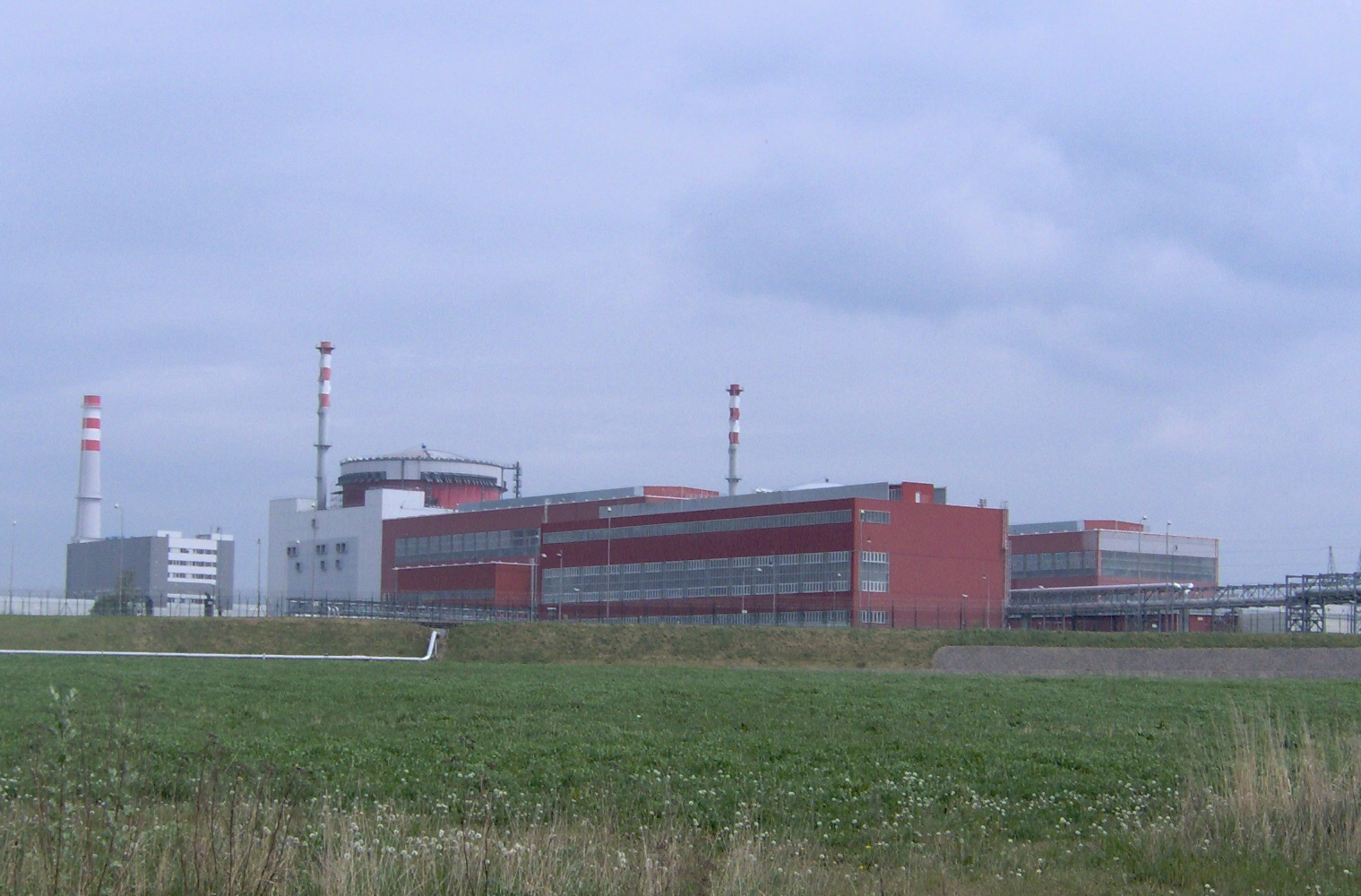
- Temelín nuclear power station
- Country: Czech Republic
- Location: Temelín, South Bohemian Region
- Coordinates: 49°10′52″N 14°22′51″E
- Status: Operational
- Construction began: 1981
- Commission date: 10 June 2002
- Construction cost: 98.6 billion CZK
- Owner: ČEZ Group
- Operator: ČEZ Group
- Employees: ~1,000

Nuclear power station
- Reactor type: VVER 1000/320 PWRs

Power generation
- Units operational: 2 x 1086 MWe (gross)
- Units cancelled: 2 x 950 MWe
- Nameplate capacity: 2,250 MW
- Capacity factor: 80.0%
- Annual net output: 14,401 GWh

External links
- Website: Official website
- Commons: Related media on Commons

Temelín Nuclear Power Station (Czech: Jaderná elektrárna Temelín, abbreviation ETE) is a nuclear power plant in Temelín, Czech Republic. It is owned by ČEZ Group, which employs 1,000 workers at the site. The adjacent Vysoký Hrádek Castle serves as an information centre.

In 2003, the Temelín Nuclear Power Station, with its 2,180 MW of installed capacity, became the largest power resource in the Czech Republic and the largest source of zero-emission electricity generation.

== History ==
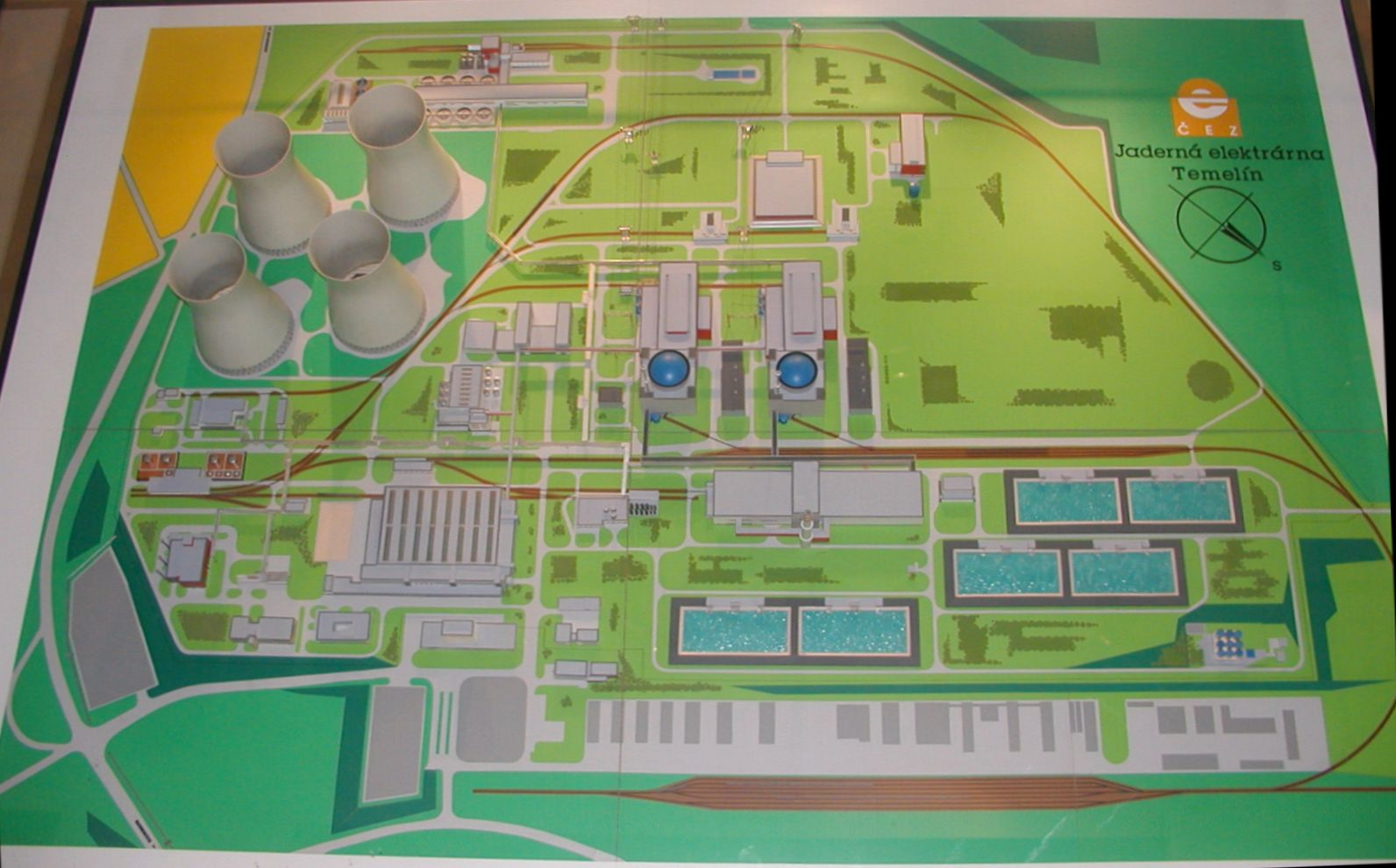
Model of the plant at the information centre. The light green area was originally intended for the two unbuilt reactors.

Planning for the Temelín Nuclear Power Station began in the late 1970s, and the final project was submitted in 1985. Construction of four operating units began in 1987. The project was expected to be completed in 1991, with estimated building costs of 35 billion CSK. Six villages were demolished by the then-Communist government to make way for the power station.

After the Velvet Revolution in 1990, the Czechoslovak government decided to cease construction of the third and fourth reactors; work continued on the first two reactors, however. In the 1990s, alterations to the original design were made by Westinghouse, in conjunction with SUJB and the IAEA, to bring reliability and safety levels into conformance with Western European standards. The standards audit was carried out by Halliburton NUS. As part of the alterations, information and control systems were added, electrical modifications carried out, and cabling, reactor core, and fuel elements were replaced. In 1993, the Czech government decided to complete the plant in the face of delays and cost overruns, with expected completion at the time estimated for 1997. In 1994, an opinion poll reported that 68% of Czech citizens were in favour of nuclear power development.

By 1998, construction was still not completed, and costs reached 71 billion CZK. The Czech government again reconsidered completion of the plant. In 1999, the decision was made to continue, projecting completion to 2000, with a maximum cost of 98.6 CZK billion. The project was controversial; national and international (mainly Austrian) opposition was stronger than in the early 1990s, and public opinion on the project fluctuated. In a 1999 opinion poll, 47% of Czech citizens were in favour and 53% against nuclear power development, a fall from 1994. In subsequent years, the same poll showed 63% in favour and 37% against in 2000 and 58% in favour and 42% against in 2001.

In September and October 2000, Austrian anti-nuclear protesters demonstrated against the Temelín Nuclear Power Plant and at one stage temporarily blocked all 26 border crossings between Austria and the Czech Republic.

As a result of cost overruns, political changes, and design changes to the plant, reactor 1 began commercial operations in June 2002, and reactor 2 on 18 April 2003. As of 2023, the two reactors had produced 272 TWh, or 272.000.000.000 kWh of electricity, with no CO_{2} emissions. Assuming a price level of CZK 2 per kWh, this amounted to 544 billion CZK. As the initial investment was CZK 100 billion, the plant had turned a profit. In 2022 alone, the operators of the plant earned CZK 80 billion, as a result of the Russian invasion of Ukraine and the resulting energy crisis.

=== Melk Protocol ===
The Melk Protocol, signed on 12 December 2000 in Melk, Austria, is the result of negotiations between the Czech and Austrian governments, led by Czech prime minister Miloš Zeman and Austrian chancellor Wolfgang Schüssel, with the participation of European Commissioner Günter Verheugen. The aim of the protocol was to resolve disputes over the Temelín plant, with Austria raising several concerns about its safety and procedures. The Czech Republic committed itself to some above-standard procedures (e.g., notification of events at Temelín to Austria, and a more stringent environmental impact assessment). Consequently, Austria recognised the importance of EU enlargement and agreed that the free movement of goods and people must be preserved (this clause was a response to the blockade of Czech–Austrian border crossings by Austrian anti-nuclear activists). The protocol is not legally binding.

== Technical data ==
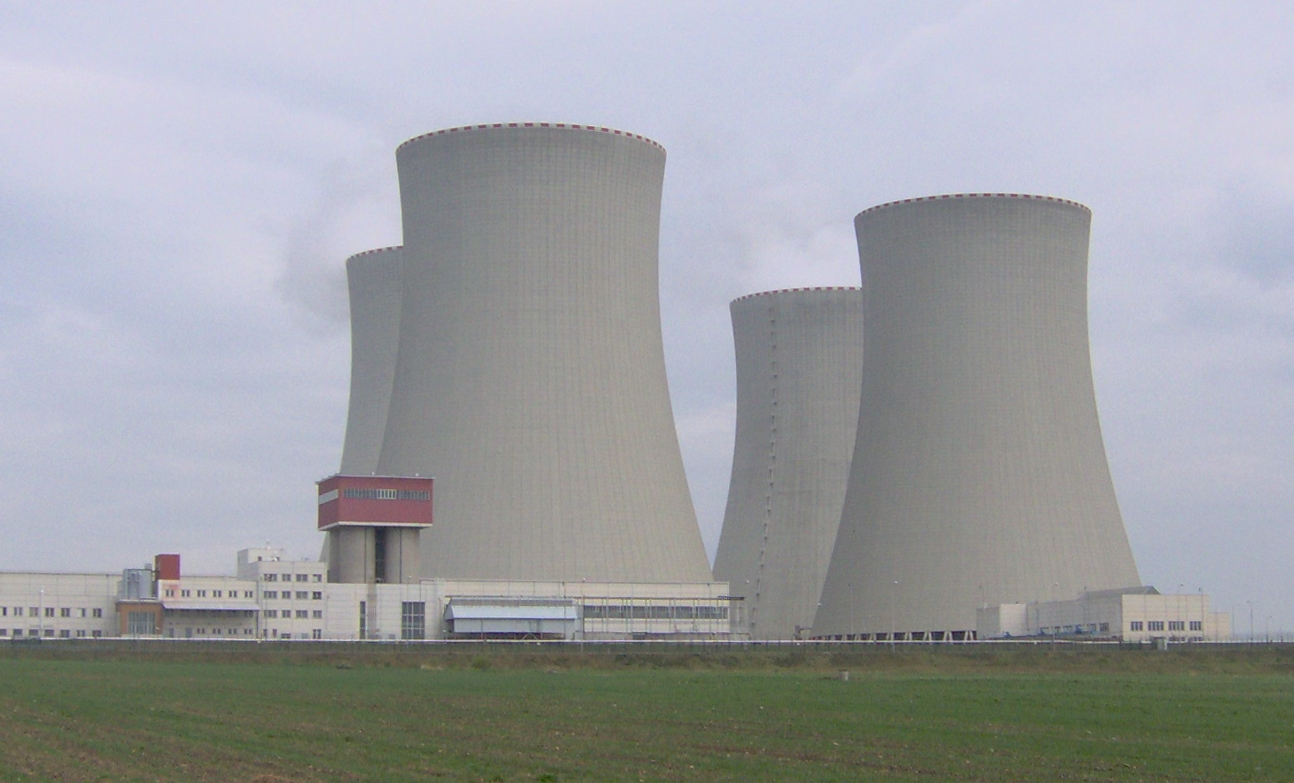
Cooling towers at Temelin NPP

In 2013, the reactors were uprated from 3,000 MW thermal output to 3,120 MW, bringing the total output to 1,003 MWe net and 1,056 MWe gross. In 2015, turbomachinery was updated, bringing total output to the current 1,026 MWe net and 1,080 MWe gross. The reactors were further uprated to 1,086 MWe gross.

Station	Reactor type	Net capacity	Gross capacity	Thermal output	Initial criticality	Grid date	Exp. shutdown
Temelín 1	VVER 1000 type V 320 PW	1,027 MWe	1,086 MWe	3,120 MW	Dec 2000	Jun 2002	2080
Temelín 2	VVER 1000 type V 320 PW	1,027 MWe	1,086 MWe	3,120 MW	Dec 2002	Apr 2003	2082

=== Reactor vessel (core) ===
- The reactor contains 163 fuel assemblies and 61 control rod assemblies.
- A single assembly has the shape of ~4.5m long hexagon, and inside are 312 fuel rods.
- The fuel rods contain stacked cylindrical fuel pellets.
- Fuel enrichment: max. 5% (average 3.5%) of ^{235}U (fissile isotope)
- Fuel load UO_{2}: 92t (the reactor splits about 3 kg of uranium every day).
- Fuel replacement cycle: 4 years (1/4 is changed yearly).
- Vessel height: ~11m; outside diameter: ~4.5m; wall thickness: 193 mm.
- The vessel is designed for up to 17.6MPa at 350 °C.
- The vessel is made of high-quality, low-alloy chrome-nickel-molybdenum-vanadium steel.
- For the reactor to produce 1W of thermal output, 30 billion fissions of uranium-235 must take place every second. For a coal power station to produce the same output, 1,500,000,000 billion carbon atoms must be burned.

=== Reactor cooling system ===
- Number of cooling loops: 4
- Quantity of primary circuit coolant: 337 m^{3}
- Operating pressure: 15.7MPa
- Coolant inlet temperature: approx. 290 °C (554F)
- Coolant outlet temperature: approx. 320 °C (608F)
- Coolant flow through reactor: 23.5 m^{3}/s

=== Steam generator ===
- Number per reactor unit: 4
- Steam delivered per one generator: 1,470 t/hour
- Steam outlet pressure: 6.3MPa
- Steam outlet temperature: 278.5 °C (533.3F)

=== Cooling circuit ===
- The plant has four cooling towers (each unit has two towers).
- Each tower has a height of 150 metres (490 ft), a diameter of 130 metres (430 ft), and an external wall surface area of 44,000 square metres (470,000 sq ft).
- Pure water is evaporated in cooling tower (~0.3m^{3}/s).
  - The water needs to be constantly refilled.

=== Protective envelope (containment) ===
- Height of cylindrical section: 38m
- Inside diameter of cylindrical section: 45m
- Wall thickness: 1.2m
- Thickness of steel lining: 8mm

=== Turbine generator set ===
- Number per unit: 1
- Number of steam turbine sections: 1 high-pressure and 3 low-pressure
- Speed: 3,000 rpm
- Voltage on alternator's terminal: 24kV
- Alternator cooling: hydrogen – water

== Reliability ==
Temelín produced a then-record 15.3 TWh of electricity in 2012. That year, unit 1 was online for 85.6% of the time and unit 2 for 87.2%, according to IAEA operating-factor data.

The plant produced a record 17.38 TWh in 2025, exceeding its previous record, set in 2017, by about 0.9 TWh. Longer intervals between refuelling shutdowns allowed the reactors to spend more time generating electricity.

== New reactors ==
=== Cancelled tender ===
ČEZ submitted the two-reactor expansion for environmental assessment in July 2008. In August 2009, it opened a tender to build the units. The bidders were Areva, Westinghouse and a consortium comprising Škoda JS, Atomstroyexport and Gidropress. In March 2011, prime minister Petr Nečas said the Fukushima accident would not change plans to build two more reactors at Temelín. ČEZ disqualified Areva in October 2012 because, according to ČEZ, its bid failed to meet statutory requirements and other tender conditions.

Westinghouse proposed the AP1000 reactor. Its rival, the Russian-Czech consortium, offered the MIR-1200. In March 2013, ZAT, Hochtief CZ and ÚJV Řež agreed to supply equipment and services if the consortium won the tender.

In January 2013, the Ministry of the Environment approved the environmental assessment, setting 90 conditions for the project. ČEZ cancelled the tender in April 2014 after the government refused to guarantee the price of electricity from the proposed reactors. ČEZ said that future changes in the electricity market had made the project uneconomic.

=== Following plans ===
The cancellation of the tender did not end preparations for the expansion. The State Office for Nuclear Safety granted a siting permit for units 3 and 4 in October 2014.

In June 2015, Bohuslav Sobotka’s government approved a nuclear energy action plan calling for preparations for one new reactor at Temelín and one at Dukovany, with the possibility of a second at each site. A replacement permit issued in November 2020 brought it into line with changes to Czech nuclear law.

In March 2022, ČEZ subsidiary Elektrárna Dukovany opened a tender for a new reactor at Dukovany. Bidders were also asked to submit non-binding offers for a second Dukovany reactor and two at Temelín. In January 2024, the government asked EDF and Korea Hydro & Nuclear Power (KHNP) for binding offers covering all four units.

The government chose KHNP in July 2024 and began negotiations for two reactors at Dukovany, keeping the Temelín units as an option. The contract signed in 2025 allowed five years to exercise the option for up to two APR1000 reactors at Temelín.

In January 2026, industry minister Karel Havlíček said the government expected to decide on the Temelín project in 2027. He added that other suppliers could also submit offers.

=== Small modular reactor ===
ČEZ chose Temelín for its first small modular reactor project in March 2022. It announced a partnership with Rolls-Royce SMR in October 2024 and acquired an approximately 20% stake in the company during 2025.

In April 2026, the companies signed a contract needed to obtain construction and nuclear permits. The contract covered preparatory work, with a decision on construction still to follow.

ČEZ submitted environmental assessment documents for the proposed 470 MWe reactor in October 2026. It expected the assessment to finish by the end of 2027 and planned to have the reactor operating in the mid-2030s.

== See also ==
- Nuclear power in the Czech Republic
- Energy in the Czech Republic
- Dukovany Nuclear Power Station
