= Vysoký Hrádek Castle =

Renaissance castle in Temelin, Czech Republic

Coordinates: 49°10′52.51″N 14°23′11.07″E

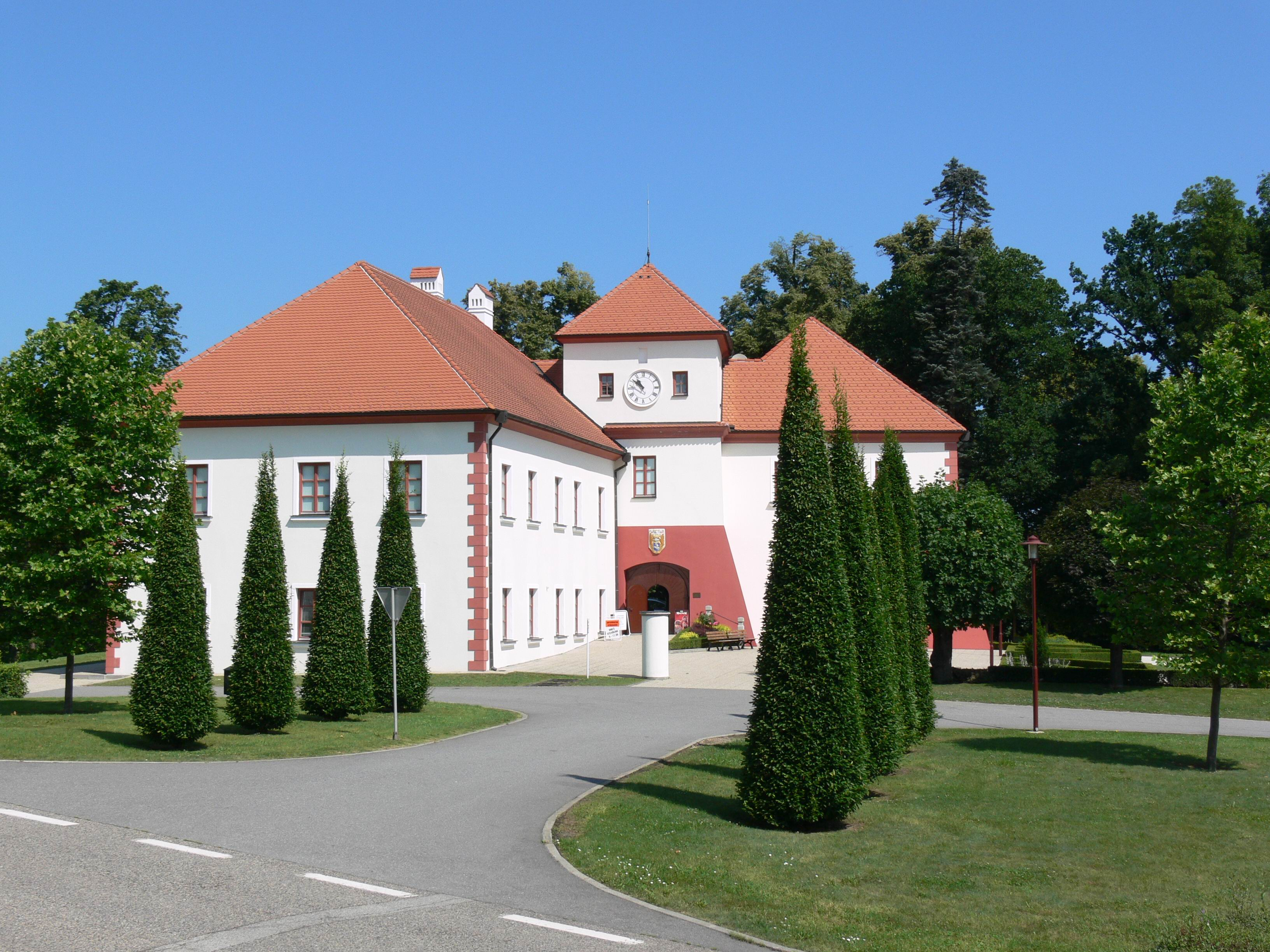
Vysoký Hrádek

Vysoký Hrádek is a Renaissance castle in Temelín, Czech Republic

Lords of Březí, from the court of Knín and Býšov originally constructed the fortress and courtyard. The first records we have are of Albert of Březí, who died in 1367. The fortress was inherited by his son, Svatomír, and then by another two sons of Albert, Smil and Bušek.

After the Lords of Březí died out, the fortress, called Hrádek, was inherited by their relatives, the Lords of Býšov.

After changing hands dozens of times, in 1948, the estate was confiscated as part of land reforms in the country, and now houses the information center for the Temelín Nuclear Power Station. Several exhibits using computer graphics and films explain how to control nuclear reactors, and reactor physics and safety.
