= Bohunice, Levice District =

Village and municipality in the Nitra Region of Slovakia

Bohunice Hontbagonya
- Municipality
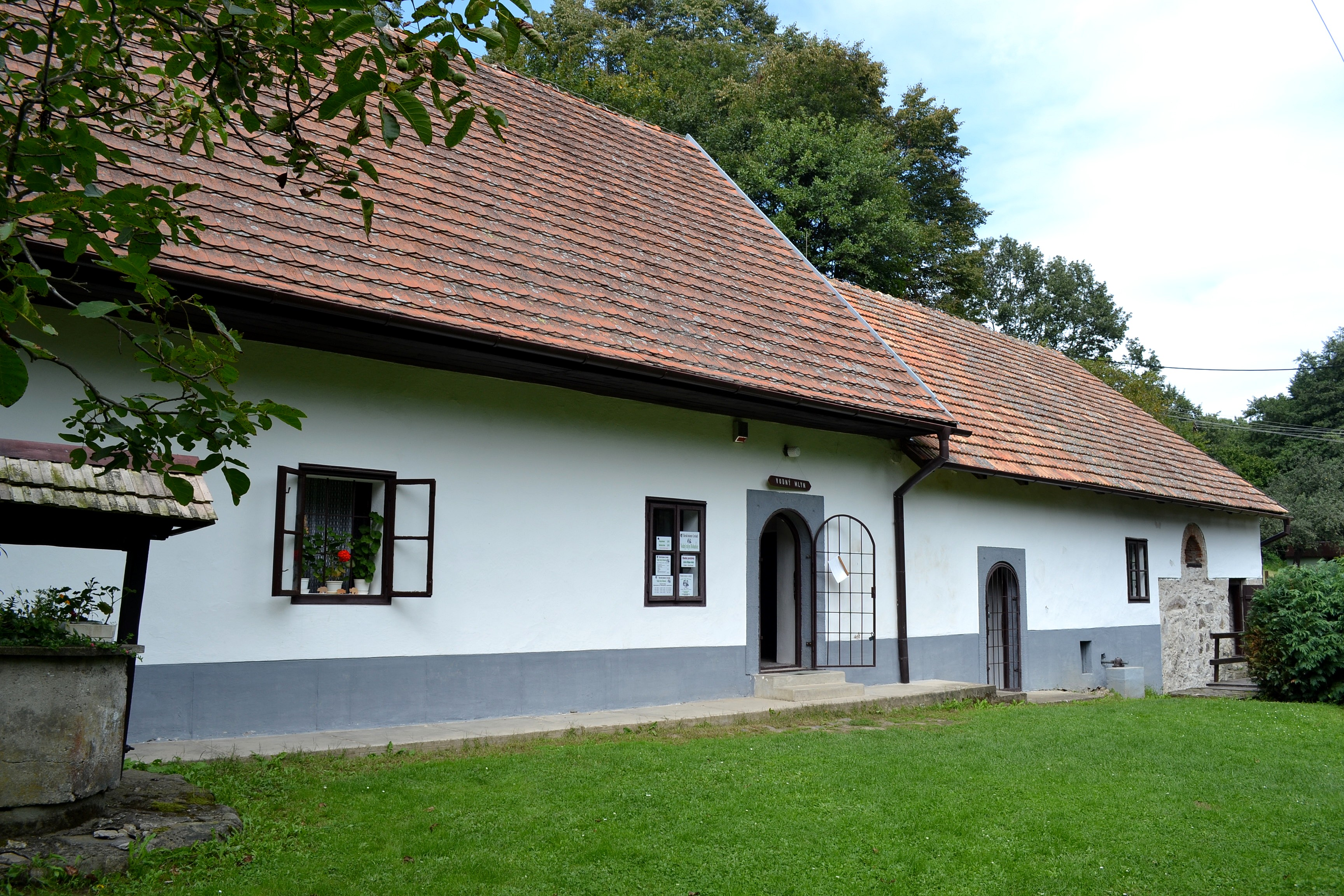
- Watermill in Bohunice

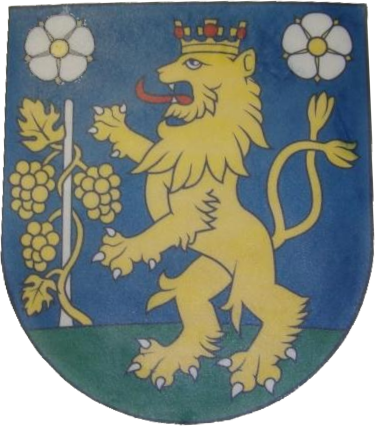
- Coat of arms

- Location of Bohunice district Levice in the Nitra Region Location of Bohunice district Levice in Slovakia
- Country: Slovakia
- Region: Nitra Region
- District: Levice District
- First mentioned: 1270

Area
  - Total: 12.83 km^{2} (4.95 sq mi)
- Elevation: 261 m (856 ft)

Population (2025)
  - Total: 160
- Time zone: UTC+1 (CET)
  - Summer (DST): UTC+2 (CEST)
- Postal code: 935 05
- Area code: +421 36
- Vehicle registration plate (until 2022): LV
- Website: www.bohunice-lv.sk

Bohunice (Hungarian: Hontbagonya; pronounced [ˈhontɒbɒɡoɲɒ]) is a village and municipality in the Levice District of the Nitra Region, in southwest Slovakia.

== History ==
In historical records the village was first mentioned in 1270.

== Geography ==
The municipality lies at an altitude of 261 metres (856 ft) and covers an area of 12.83 km^{2} (4.95 sq mi) (2025).

== Population ==
Population statistic (10 years)
| Year | 1995 | 2005 | 2015 | 2025 |
|---|---|---|---|---|
| Count | 170 | 154 | 144 | 160 |
| Difference | | −9.41% | −6.49% | +11.11% |

Population statistic
| Year | 2024 | 2025 |
|---|---|---|
| Count | 159 | 160 |
| Difference | | +0.62% |

It has a population of 160 people (31 December 2025).

=== Ethnicity ===
Census 2021 (1+ %)
| Ethnicity | Number | Fraction |
|---|---|---|
| Slovak | 142 | 95.3% |
| Not found out | 8 | 5.36% |
| Czech | 3 | 2.01% |
| Other | 3 | 2.01% |
| English | 2 | 1.34% |
| Total | 149 | |

In year 2021 was 149 people by ethnicity 142 as Slovak, 8 as Not found out, 3 as Czech, 3 as Other, 2 as English, 1 as Polish and 1 as Hungarian.

Note on population: The difference values of population numbers in the table "Population statistic" and in the sections "Ethnicity" & "Religion" is caused by the use of various statistical methods.

=== Religion ===
Census 2021 (1+ %)
| Religion | Number | Fraction |
|---|---|---|
| Evangelical Church | 64 | 42.95% |
| Roman Catholic Church | 38 | 25.5% |
| None | 32 | 21.48% |
| Not found out | 7 | 4.7% |
| Other and not ascertained christian church | 4 | 2.68% |
| Ad hoc movements | 4 | 2.68% |
| Total | 149 | |

In year 2021 was 149 people by religion 64 from Evangelical Church, 38 from Roman Catholic Church, 32 from None, 7 from Not found out, 4 from Other and not ascertained christian church and 4 from Ad hoc movements.

== Genealogical resources ==
The records for genealogical research are available at the state archive "Statny Archiv in Nitra, Slovakia"

- Roman Catholic church records (births/marriages/deaths): 1688-1898 (parish B)
- Lutheran church records (births/marriages/deaths): 1717-1895 (parish A)

== See also ==
- List of municipalities and towns in Slovakia
