= Všemyslice =

- Municipality
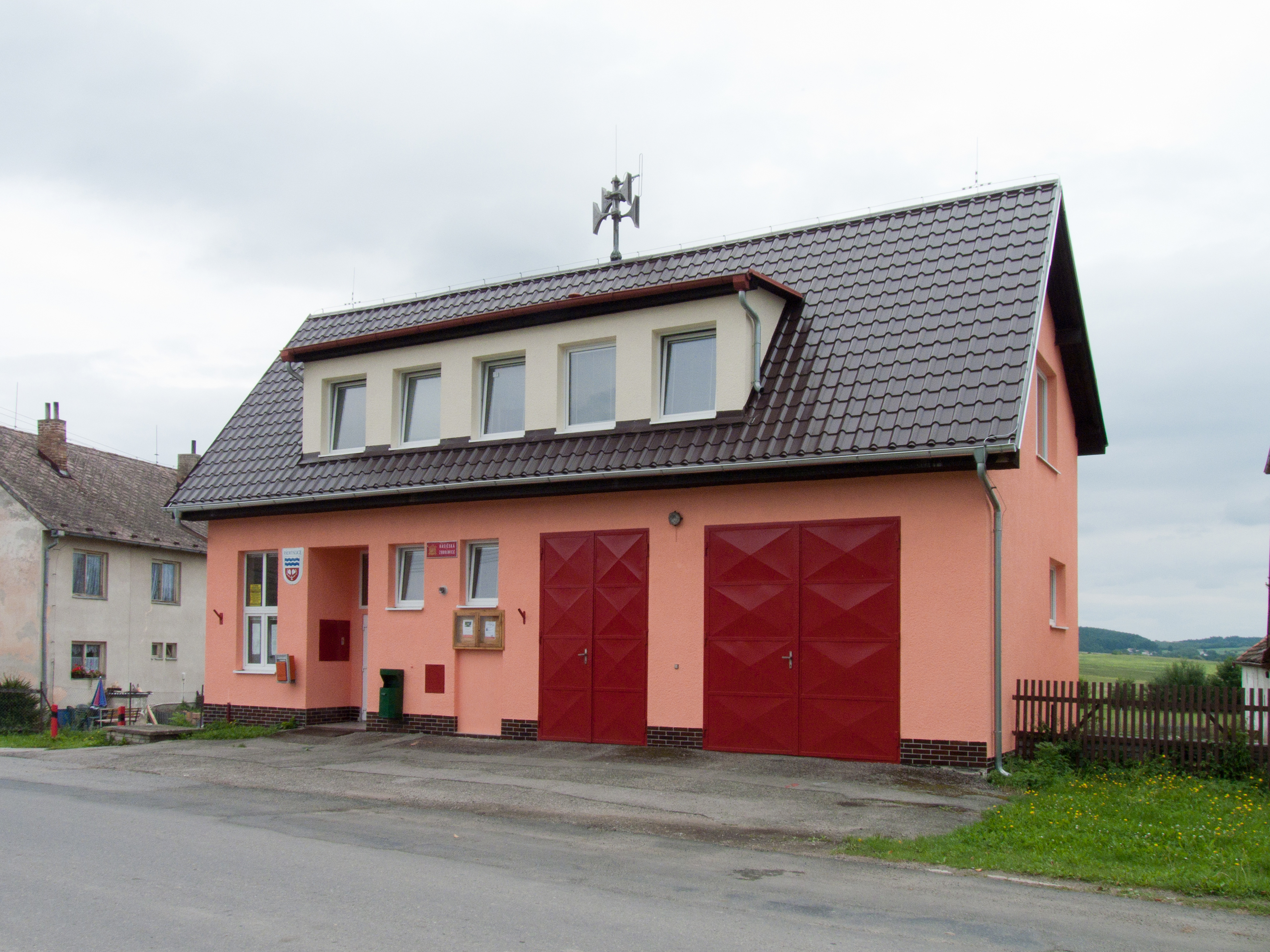
- Library and firehouse

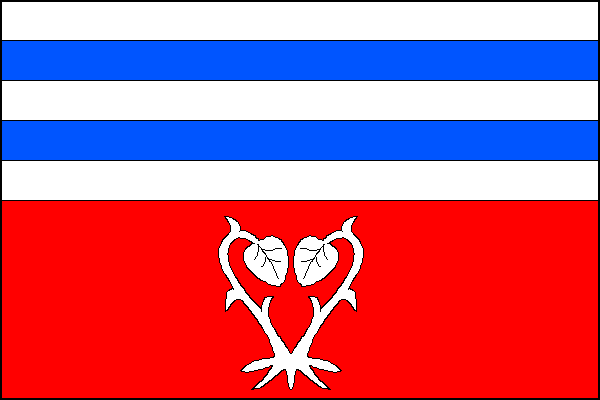
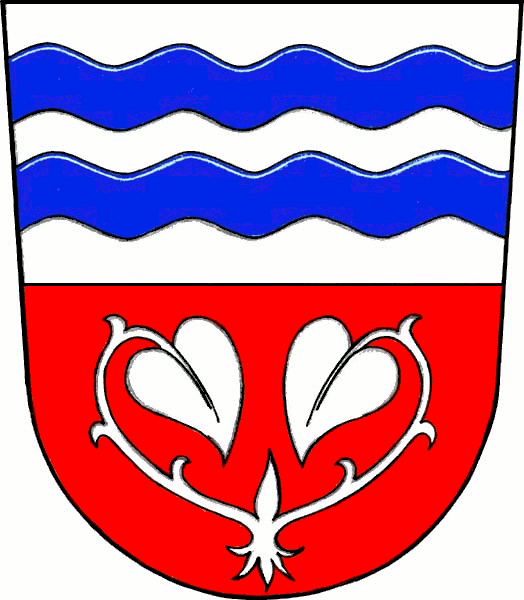
- Flag Coat of arms

- Location in the Czech Republic
- Coordinates: 49°13′1″N 14°21′28″E
- Country: Czech Republic
- Region: South Bohemian
- District: České Budějovice
- First mentioned: 1352

Area
  - Total: 28.13 km^{2} (10.86 sq mi)
- Elevation: 427 m (1,401 ft)

Population (2026-01-01)
  - Total: 1,204
  - Density: 42.80/km^{2} (110.9/sq mi)
- Time zone: UTC+1 (CET)
  - Summer (DST): UTC+2 (CEST)
- Postal codes: 373 02, 375 01
- Website: www.vsemyslice.eu

Všemyslice is a municipality and village in České Budějovice District in the South Bohemian Region of the Czech Republic. It has about 1,200 inhabitants.

== Administrative division ==
Všemyslice consists of five municipal parts (in brackets population according to the 2021 census):

- Všemyslice (104)
- Bohunice (185)
- Neznašov (655)
- Slavětice (34)
- Všeteč (135)

== Etymology ==
The name is derived from the personal name Všemysl, meaning "the village of Všemysl's people".

== Geography ==
Všemyslice is located about 27 kilometres (17 mi) north of České Budějovice. It lies in the Tábor Uplands. The highest point is the hill Vysoký Kamýk at 627 m (2,057 ft) above sea level. The Vltava River flows along the northern municipal border. The Orlík Reservoir, built on the Vltava, also marginally extends into the municipal territory.

== History ==
The territory of the municipality was inhabited already in prehistoric and early medieval times. There was a flat, unfortified settlement in the locality of the hill Kořenský vrch. In the locality of Kozí vrch was a two-part fortified settlement from the Bronze Age.

The first written mention of Všemyslice is from 1352. Until the Thirty Years' War, the village was owned by various less important noblemen. After the properties of the nobleman Bohuslav Malovec were confiscated in 1622, Všemyslice was acquired by Baltasar Marradas. In 1630, Všemyslice was bought by the Counts of Vrtba and merged with the Neznašov estate.

== Demographics ==
Historical population

Year	Pop.	±%
1869	1,723	—
1880	1,632	−5.3%
1890	1,501	−8.0%
1900	1,492	−0.6%
1910	1,483	−0.6%

Year	Pop.	±%
1921	1,381	−6.9%
1930	1,276	−7.6%
1950	971	−23.9%
1961	963	−0.8%
1970	839	−12.9%

Year	Pop.	±%
1980	764	−8.9%
1991	909	+19.0%
2001	958	+5.4%
2011	998	+4.2%
2021	1,113	+11.5%

Source: Censuses

== Transport ==
There are no major roads passing through the municipality. The railway that runs through the southern part of the municipality is unused.

== Sights ==
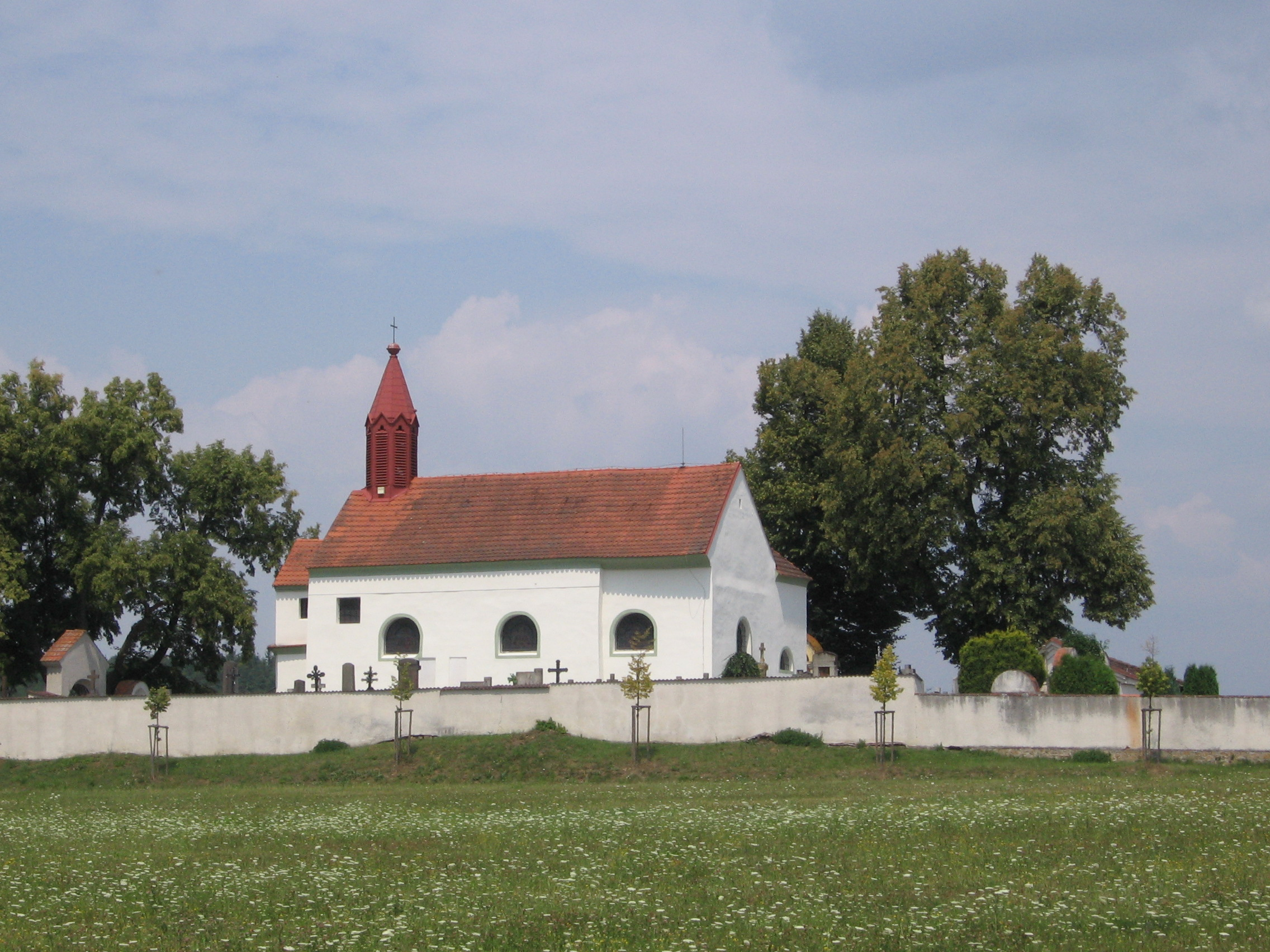
Church of the Holy Trinity

The most valuable building of the municipality is the Church of the Holy Trinity, located near Neznašov. It was originally a medieval church from the first half of the 14th century. It was modified in the Renaissance style in 1606–1607 and then rebuilt into its present Baroque form in the 18th century.

Near the church is located the funeral chapel of the Berchtold family. It was built in the neo-Baroque style in 1930. It has a valuable interior.

The main landmark of the centre of Neznašov is the Neznašov Castle. A fortress in Neznašov was built probably shortly after 1540. In 1800, it was rebuilt into the Empire castle. Today the building is unused.

South of Neznašov is a Jewish cemetery, founded around 1741. More than 300 tombstone have been preserved to this day. The oldest tombstone dates from 1735.
