= List of nuclear power stations =

This page lists operating, under construction, and permanently shut down nuclear power stations. Note that most nuclear power stations operate more than one nuclear reactor. For more information on the construction/commission/decommission dates of individual reactors at power stations, see the List of commercial nuclear reactors.

The list is based on figures from PRIS (Power Reactor Information System) maintained by International Atomic Energy Agency.

== In service ==
As of May 2023, there are 436 operable nuclear power reactors worldwide. This table lists all currently operational power stations. Some of these may have reactors under construction, but only current net capacity is listed. Capacity of permanently shut-down reactors is not included, but capacity of long-term shut-down reactors (today mainly in Japan) is included.

Power station	# units (Note: Units in service only)	Capacity (MWe) (Note: Reference unit power)	Country or territory	Location	Began operation	Refs
Akademik Lomonosov	2	64	Russia	69°42′35″N 170°18′22″E	2020	
Almaraz	2	2,017	Spain	39°48′29″N 05°41′49″W	1981	
Angra	2	1,884 (Note: 1,245 MW reactor under construction)	Brazil	23°00′30″S 44°28′26″W	1985	
ANO	2	1,839	United States	35°18′37″N 93°13′53″W	1974	
Ascó	2	1,992	Spain	41°12′00″N 00°34′10″E	1984	
Astravets	2	2,220	Belarus	54°45′43″N 26°7′12″E	2021	
Atucha	2	1,033	Argentina	33°58′3″S 59°12′18″W	1974	
Balakovo	4	3,800	Russia	52°05′28″N 47°57′19″E	1986	
Barakah	4	5,380	UAE	23°59′6″N 52°17′1″E	2021	
Beaver Valley	2	1,738	United States	40°37′24″N 80°25′50″W	1976	
Belleville	2	2,620	France	47°30′35″N 02°52′30″E	1988	
Beloyarsk	2	1,597 (Note: 2 reactors with 248 MW permanently shut down)	Russia	56°50′30″N 61°19′21″E	1964	
Beznau	2	730	Switzerland	47°33′07″N 08°13′40″E	1969	
Blayais	4	3,640	France	45°15′21″N 00°41′35″W	1981	
Bohunice	2	943 (Note: 3 reactors are permanently shut down)	Slovakia	48°29′40″N 17°40′55″E	1972	
Borssele	1	482	Netherlands	51°25′51″N 3°43′06″E	1973	
Braidwood	2	2,330	United States	41°14′37″N 88°13′45″W	1987	
Browns Ferry	3	3,775	United States	34°42′14″N 87°07′07″W	1974	
Bruce	8	6,600	Canada	44°19′31″N 81°35′58″W	1977	
Brunswick	2	1,858	United States	33°57′30″N 78°0′37″W	1977	
Bugey	4	3,580 (Note: 540 MW reactor permanently shut down)	France	45°48′00″N 05°16′15″E	1972	
Bushehr	1	915 (Note: one reactor with 974 MW under construction)	Iran	28°49′47″N 50°53′10″E	2011	
Byron	2	2,300	United States	42°4′27″N 89°16′55″W	1985	
Callaway	1	1,190	United States	38°45′42″N 91°46′48″W	1984	
Calvert Cliffs	2	1,735	United States	38°25′55″N 76°26′32″W	1975	
Catawba	2	2,258	United States	35°3′6″N 81°4′12″W	1985	
Cattenom	4	5,200	France	49°24′57″N 06°13′05″E	1987	
Cernavodă	2	1,300	Romania	44°19′20″N 28°03′26″E	1996	
Changjiang	2	1,220 (Note: one reactor with 610 MW under construction)	China	19°27′37″N 108°54′0″E	2015	
Chashma	5	2,530 (Note: 1 reactor with 1,200 MW under construction)	Pakistan	32°23′25″N 71°27′45″E	2000	
Chinon	4	3,620 (Note: 3 reactors with 610 MW permanently shut down)	France	47°13′50″N 00°10′14″E	1964	
Chooz	2	3,000 (Note: 305 MW reactor permanently shut down)	France	50°05′24″N 04°47′22″E	1967	
Civaux	2	2,990	France	46°27′24″N 00°39′10″E	2002	
Clinton	1	1,043	United States	40°10′20″N 88°50′06″W	1987	
Cofrentes	1	1,064	Spain	39°13′00″N 01°03′00″W	1984	
Columbia	1	1,107	United States	46°28′16″N 119°20′02″W	1984	
Comanche Peak	2	2,367	United States	32°17′54″N 97°47′06″W	1990	
Cooper	1	770	United States	40°21′43″N 95°38′29″W	1974	
Cruas	4	3,660	France	44°37′59″N 04°45′24″E	1983	
Dampierre	4	3,560	France	47°43′59″N 02°31′00″E	1980	
Darlington	4	3,512	Canada	43°52′22″N 78°43′11″W	1992	
Davis-Besse	1	965	United States	41°35′48″N 83°5′11″W	1978	
Daya Bay	2	1,888	China	22°35′52″N 114°32′37″E	1993	
Diablo Canyon	2	2,240	United States	35°12′39″N 120°51′22″W	1985	
Doel	1	1,026 (Note: 3 reactors with 1,896 MW permanently shut down)	Belgium	51°19′29″N 04°15′31″E	1975	
Donald C. Cook	2	2,069	United States	41°58′31″N 86°33′57″W	1975	
Dresden	2	1,734 (Note: 197 MW reactor permanently shut down)	United States	41°23′23″N 88°16′5″W	1960	
Dukovany	4	1,878	Czech Republic	49°05′06″N 16°08′56″E	1985	
Edwin I. Hatch	2	1,759	United States	31°56′03″N 82°20′38″W	1975	
Embalse	1	600	Argentina	32.232°S 64.443°W	1984	
Fermi	1	1,122 (Note: 61 MW reactor permanently shut down)	United States	41°57′46″N 83°15′27″W	1966	
Fangchenggang	4	4,000	China	21°40′00″N 108°33′47″E	2016	
Fangjiashan	2	2,000	China	30°26′29″N 120°56′30″E	2014	
Flamanville	3	4,280	France	49°32′11″N 01°52′54″W	1986	
Forsmark	3	3,138	Sweden	60°24′12″N 18°10′00″E	1980	
Fuqing	6	6,120	China	25°26′39″N 119°26′46″E	2014	
Genkai	2	2,254 (Note: 2 reactors with 1,058 MW permanently shut down)	Japan	33°30′56″N 129°50′14″E	1975	
Ginna	1	610	United States	43°16′40″N 77°18′36″W	1970	
Gösgen	1	1,010	Switzerland	47°21′57″N 07°58′00″E	1979	
Golfech	2	2,620	France	44°06′24″N 00°50′43″E	1991	
Grand Gulf	1	1,419	United States	32°0′24″N 91°2′54″W	1985	
Gravelines	6	5,460	France	51°00′55″N 02°08′10″E	1980	
Haiyang	2	2,340 (Note: 2 reactors with 2,322 MW under construction)	China	36°42′33″N 121°22′54″E	2018	
Hamaoka	3	3,473 (Note: 2 reactors with 1,321 MW permanently shut down)	Japan	34°37′25″N 138°08′33″E	1976	
Hanbit	6	5,875	South Korea	35°24′54″N 126°25′26″E	1986	
Hanul	8	7,268	South Korea	37°5′34″N 129°23′1″E	1988	
Hartlepool	2	1,190	United Kingdom	54°38′06″N 01°10′51″W	1983	
H. B. Robinson	1	735	United States	34°24′10″N 80°9′30″W	1971	
Heysham	4	2,400	United Kingdom	54°01′44″N 02°54′58″W	1983	
Higashidōri	1	1,067	Japan	41°11′17″N 141°23′25″E	2005	
Hongyanhe	6	6,244	China	39°47′52″N 121°28′19″E	2013	
Hope Creek	1	1,191	United States	39°28′04″N 75°32′17″W	1986	
Ikata	1	845	Japan	33°29′27″N 132°18′41″E	1977	
James A. FitzPatrick	1	838	United States	43°31.4′N 76°23.9′W	1975	
Joseph M. Farley	2	1,711	United States	31°13′23″N 85°06′42″W	1977	
Kalinin	4	3,800	Russia	57°54′20″N 35°03′37″E	1985	
Kaiga	4	808	India	14°51′55″N 74°26′22″E	2000	
Kakrapar	4	1,840	India	21°14′19″N 73°21′00″E	1993	
Karachi	2	2,028 (Note: 90 MW reactor permanently shut down)	Pakistan	24°50′49.8″N 66°47′17.7″E	1971	
Kashiwazaki-Kariwa	7	7,965 (Note: All reactors shut down in 2011; 1 reactor with 1,315 MW restarted in 2026)	Japan	37°25′45″N 138°35′43″E	1985	
Khmelnytskyi	2	1,900 (Note: Another 1,900 MW under construction)	Ukraine	50°18′5″N 26°38′59″E	1987	
Koeberg	2	1,830	South Africa	33°40′35″S 18°25′55″E	1984	
Kola	4	1,644	Russia	67°28′00″N 32°28′00″E	1973	
Kori	7	7,489 (Note: 576 MW reactor permanently shut down; 2 reactors with total 2,680 MW under construction)	South Korea	35°19′01″N 129°18′00″E	1978	
Kozloduy	2	2,006 (Note: 4 reactors with 1,632 MW permanently shut down)	Bulgaria	43°44′46″N 23°46′14″E	1974	
Krško	1	688	Slovenia / Croatia	45°56′18″N 15°30′56″E	1983	
Kudankulam	2	1,834 (Note: 917 MW reactor under construction)	India	8°10′06″N 77°42′45″E	2013	
Kursk	2	1,850 (Note: 2 reactors with 1,850 MW permanently shut down. 2 reactors with total 2,230 MW under construction)	Russia	51°40′30″N 35°36′20″E	1977	
Laguna Verde	2	1,300	Mexico	19°43′15″N 96°24′23″W	1990	
LaSalle	2	2,238	United States	41°14′44″N 88°40′9″W	1982	
Leibstadt	1	1,245	Switzerland	47°36′11″N 08°11′05″E	1984	
Leningrad	2	1,850 (Note: 2 reactors with total 1,850 MW permanently shut down)	Russia	59°50′50″N 29°02′37″E	1974	
Leningrad II	2	2,167	Russia	59°49′50″N 29°3′26″E	1976	
Limerick	2	2,264	United States	40°13′36″N 75°35′14″W	1986	
Ling Ao	4	3,876	China	22°36′17″N 114°33′5″E	2002	
Loviisa	2	1,014	Finland	60°22′20″N 26°20′50″E	1977	
McGuire	2	2,200	United States	35°25′57″N 80°56′54″W	1981	
Madras	2	410	India	12°33′27″N 80°10′30″E	1984	
Metsamor	1	448 (Note: 376 MW reactor permanently shut down)	Armenia	40°10′51″N 44°8′56″E	1976	
Mihama	1	780	Japan	35°42′12″N 135°57′48″E	1970	
Millstone	3	2,102 (Note: 641 MW reactor permanently shut down)	United States	41°18′43″N 72°10′07″W	1971	
Monticello	1	647	United States	45°20′1″N 93°50′57″W	1971	
Mochovce	3	1,370 (Note: 1 reactor with 440 MW under construction)	Slovakia	48°15′50″N 18°27′25″E	1998	
Narora	2	404	India	28°09′29″N 78°24′34″E	1991	
Nine Mile Point	2	1,764	United States	43°31′15″N 76°24′25″W	1969	
Ningde	4	4,072 (Note: 1,200 MW reactor under construction)	China	27°02′46″N 120°17′18″E	2012	
Nogent	2	2,620	France	48°30′55″N 03°31′04″E	1987	
North Anna	2	1,875	United States	38°03′38″N 77°47′22″W	1978	
Novovoronezh I	3	1,720 (Note: 2 reactors with 533 MW permanently shut down)	Russia	51°16′30″N 39°12′00″E	1964	
Novovoronezh II	2	2,228	Russia	59°49′50″N 29°3′26″E	2017	
Oconee	3	2,538	United States	34°47′38″N 82°53′53″W	1973	
Ōi	2	2,254 (Note: 2 reactors with 2,240 MW permanently shut down)	Japan	35°32′26″N 135°39′07″E	1979	
Olkiluoto	3	3,380	Finland	61°14′13″N 21°26′27″E	1979	
Onagawa	2	1,592 (Note: 1 reactor with 498 MW permanently shut down)	Japan	38°24′04″N 141°29′59″E	1984	
Oskarshamn	1	1,400 (Note: 638 MW and 473 MW reactors permanently shut down)	Sweden	57°24′56″N 16°40′16″E	1972	
Paks	4	1,889	Hungary	46°34′21″N 18°51′15″E	1982	
Palo Verde	3	3,942	United States	33°23′21″N 112°51′54″W	1976	
Paluel	4	5,320	France	49°51′29″N 00°38′08″E	1985	
Penly	2	2,660	France	49°58′36″N 01°12′43″E	1990	
Peach Bottom	2	2,234 (Note: 40 MW reactor permanently shut down)	United States	39°45′30″N 76°16′05″W	1967	
Perry	1	1,240	United States	41°48′03″N 81°08′36″W	1987	
Pickering	4	2,064 (Note: 4 reactors with 2,060 MW permanently shut down)	Canada	43°48′42″N 79°03′57″W	1971	
Point Beach	2	1,182	United States	44°16′52″N 87°32′12″W	1970	
Point Lepreau	1	635	Canada	45°04′08″N 66°27′17″W	1983	
Prairie Island	2	1,114	United States	44°37′18″N 92°37′59″W	1973	
Qinshan	7	4,101	China	30°26′08″N 120°57′23″E	1994	
Quad Cities	2	1,774	United States	41°43′35″N 90°18′36″W	1973	
Rajasthan	7	1,759 (Note: 1 reactor with 630 MW under construction)	India	24°52′20″N 75°36′50″E	1973	
Ringhals	2	2,189 (Note: 2 reactors with 1,733 MW permanently shut down)	Sweden	57°15′35″N 12°06′39″E	1976	
River Bend	1	967	United States	30°45.4′N 91°20′W	1986	
Rivne	4	2,645	Ukraine	51°19′40″N 25°53′30″E	1981	
Rostov	4	3,922	Russia	47°35′58″N 42°22′19″E	2001	
Saint-Alban	2	2,670	France	45°24′16″N 04°45′16″E	1986	
Saint-Laurent	2	1,830 (Note: 2 reactors with 855 MW permanently shut down)	France	47°43′12″N 01°34′39″E	1969	
Saint Lucie	2	1,678	United States	27°20′55″N 80°14′47″W	1976	
Salem	2	2,332	United States	39°27′46″N 75°32′08″W	1977	
Sanmen	2	2,314 (Note: 2 reactors with 2,326 MW under construction)	China	29°06′04″N 121°38′23″E	2018	
Seabrook	1	1,247	United States	42°53′56″N 70°51′03″W	1990	
Sendai	2	1,692	Japan	31°50′01″N 130°11′23″E	1984	
Sequoyah	2	2,278	United States	35°13′35″N 85°05′30″W	1981	
Shearon Harris	1	964	United States	35°38.0′N 78°57.3′W	1987	
Shidao Bay	1	200 (Note: 1,134 MW reactor under construction)	China	36°58′20″N 122°31′44″E	2021	
Shika	2	1,613	Japan	37°03′40″N 136°43′35″E	1993	
Shimane	1	789 (Note: 1 reactor with 439 MW permanently shut down, 1 reactor with 1,325 MW under construction)	Japan	35°32′18″N 132°59′57″E	1974	
Sizewell-B	1	1,188	United Kingdom	52°12′48″N 01°37′07″E	1995	
Smolensk	3	2,775	Russia	54°10′09″N 33°14′48″E	1982	
South Texas	2	2,560	United States	28°47′44″N 96°02′56″W	1988	
South Ukraine	3	2,850	Ukraine	47°49′00″N 31°13′00″E	1983	
Surry	2	1,638	United States	37°09′56″N 76°41′52″W	1972	
Susquehanna	2	2,429	United States	41°05′20″N 76°08′56″W	1983	
Taishan	2	3,320	China	21°54′34″N 112°58′45″E	2018	
Takahama	4	3,220	Japan	35°31′20″N 135°30′17″E	1974	
Tarapur	4	1,280	India	19°49′40″N 72°39′40″E	1969	
Temelín	2	2,056	Czech Republic	49°10′48″N 14°22′34″E	2002	
Tianwan	6	6,070 (Note: 2 reactors with 2,342 MW under construction)	China	34°41′13″N 119°27′35″E	2006	
Tihange	1	1,030 (Note: 2 reactor with 1,970 MW permanently shut down)	Belgium	50°32′05″N 05°16′21″E	1975	
Tokai	1	1,060 (Note: 137 MW reactor permanently shut down)	Japan	36°27′59″N 140°36′24″E	1966	
Tomari	3	1,966	Japan	43°02′10″N 140°30′45″E	1989	
Torness	2	1,205	United Kingdom	55°58′05″N 02°24′33″W	1988	
Tricastin	4	3,660	France	44°19′47″N 04°43′56″E	1980	
Trillo	1	1,003	Spain	40°42′04″N 02°37′19″W	1988	
Tsuruga	1	1,108 (Note: 340 MW reactor permanently shut down)	Japan	35°40′22″N 136°04′38″E	1970	
Turkey Point	2	1,658	United States	25°26′03″N 80°19′50″W	1967	
Vandellòs	1	1,045 (Note: 480 MW reactor permanently shut down)	Spain	40°57′05″N 00°52′00″E	1972	
Virgil C. Summer	1	973	United States	34°17′55″N 81°18′53″W	1984	
Vogtle	4	4,536	United States	33°08′35″N 81°45′57″W	1987	
Waterford	1	1,168	United States	29°59′43″N 90°28′16″W	1985	
Watts Bar	2	2,288	United States	35°36′10″N 84°47′22″W	1996	
Wolf Creek	1	1,160	United States	38°14′20″N 95°41′20″W	1985	
Wolseong	5	3,835 (Note: 661 MW reactor permanently shut down)	South Korea	35°42′40″N 129°28′30″E	1983	
Yangjiang	6	6,000	China	21°42′35″N 112°15′38″E	2013	
Zaporizhzhia (Note: All reactors temporarily shut down in September 2022 during the ongoing Russo-Ukrainian War)	6	5,700	Ukraine	47°30′44″N 34°35′09″E	1985	
Zhangzhou	2 (Note: 2 reactors with 2,258 MW under construction)	2,258	China	23°49′45″N 117°29′30″E	2024	

== Under construction ==
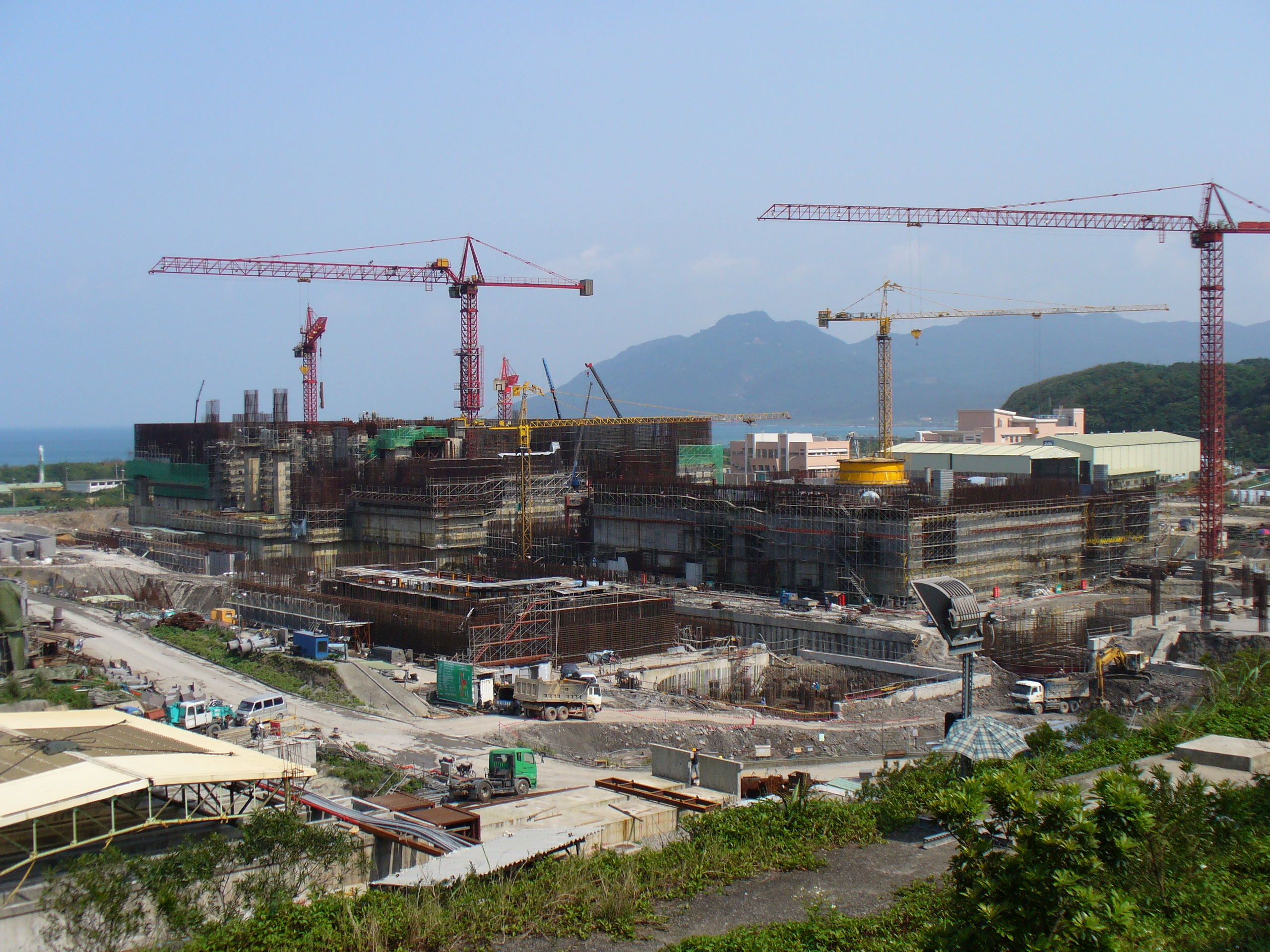
The Lungmen Nuclear Power Plant under construction (now halted)

This table lists stations under construction stations without any reactor in service. Planned connection column indicates the connection of the first reactor, thus not whole capacity.

Power station	No. of units	Net capacity under construction (MW)	Construction start	Planned connection	Country	Location
Akkuyu	4	4,456	2015	2026	Turkey	36°08′40″N 33°32′28″E
Bailong	1	1,161	2024	2030	China	21°32′43″N 108°17′38″E
Bushehr	2	2,100	2017	2028	Iran	28°49′44″N 50°53′14″E
El Dabaa	4	3,582	2022	2026	Egypt	31°02′39″N 28°29′52″E
Hinkley Point C	2	3,300	2018	2029	United Kingdom	51°12′22″N 3°8′38″W
Jinqimen	1	1,233	2025	?	China	29°03′23″N 121°56′41″E
Kemmerer	1	345 (nominal); 500 (peak)	2024	2030	United States	41°42′21″N 110°33′38″W
Lianjiang	2	6,960	2022	2028	China	21°33′15″N 109°48′25″E
Linglong	1	100	2021	2026	China	19°27′38.7″N 108°53′59.70″E
Lufeng	2	2,232	2022	2028	China	22°45′00″N 115°48′00″E
Ōma	1	1,325	2010	2030	Japan	41°30′35″N 140°54′37″E
Rooppur	2	2,160	2017	2026	Bangladesh	24°4′0″N 89°2′50″E
San’ao	2	2,234	2020	2026	China	27°12′05″N 120°30′57″E
Taipingling	3	3,441	2019	2026	China	22°41′40″N 114°59′00″E
Xiapu	2	1,284	2017	2026	China	26°48′13″N 120°09′18″E
Xudabao	4	4,400	2021	2028	China	40°21′05″N 120°32′47″E

== Permanently shut down ==
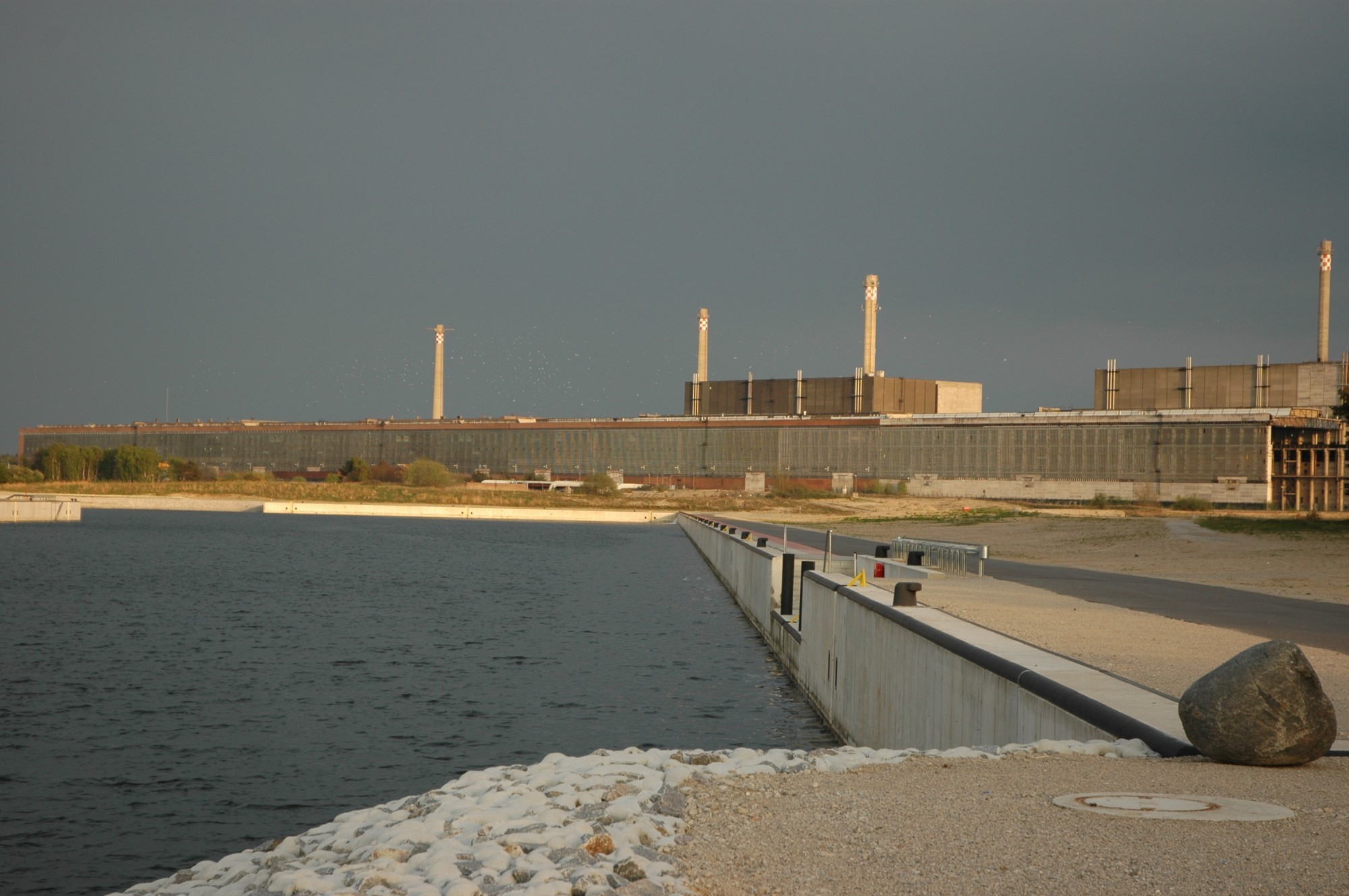
The site of former Greifswald Nuclear Power Plant

This table lists stations that are permanently shut down.

Power station	Past capacity (MW)	Country or territory	Location	Began operation	Shut down
Barsebäck	1,200	Sweden	55°44′40″N 12°55′15″E	1975	2001
Biblis	2,407	Germany	49°42′36″N 08°24′55″E	1974	2011
Bilibino	44	Russia	68°3′1″N 166°32′19″E	1974	2025
Brokdorf	1,410	Germany	53°51′03″N 09°20′41″E	1986	2011
Caorso	860	Italy	45°04′20″N 9°52′20″E	1970	1990
Chin Shan	1,208	Taiwan	25°17′10″N 121°35′15″E	1978	2019
Chernobyl	3,515	Ukraine	51°23′22″N 30°05′57″E	1977	2000
Duane Arnold	601	United States	42°6′2″N 91°46′38″W	1975	2020
Dungeness	1,540	United Kingdom	50°54′50″N 00°57′50″E	1965	2021
Emsland	1,329	Germany	52°28′27″N 07°19′04″E	1988	2023
Enrico Fermi	260	Italy	45°11′03″N 8°16′39″E	1964	1990
Fessenheim	1,760	France	47°54′11″N 07°33′47″E	1978	2020
Fort Calhoun	478.6	United States	41°31′13″N 96°4′38″W	1973	2016
Fukushima Daiichi	4,546	Japan	37°25′17″N 141°01′57″E	1971	2011
Fukushima Daini	4,400	Japan	37°19′10″N 141°01′16″E	1982	2019
Garigliano	150	Italy	41°15′30″N 13°50′05″E	1964	1982
Gentilly	675	Canada	46°23′45″N 72°21′25″W	1983	2012
Grafenrheinfeld	1,275	Germany	49°59′02″N 10°11′05″E	1981	2015
Greifswald	2,040	Germany	54°08′26″N 13°39′52″E	1974	1990
Grohnde	1,360	Germany	52°02′07″N 09°24′48″E	1984	2021
Gundremmingen	2,809	Germany	48°30′53″N 10°24′08″E	1967	2021
Hinkley Point A	470	United Kingdom	51°12′31″N 3°08′01″W	1965	2000
Hinkley Point B	870	United Kingdom	51.209°N 3.128°W	1976	2022
Hunterston B	985	United Kingdom	55.722°N 4.890°W	1976	2022
Ignalina	2,370	Lithuania	55°36′16″N 26°33′36″E	1983	2009
Indian Point	2,285	United States	41°16′11″N 73°57′08″W	1962	2021
Isar	2,387	Germany	48°36′20″N 12°17′35″E	1979	2023
Krümmel	1,346	Germany	53°24′36″N 10°24′32″E	1983	2011
Kuosheng	1,970	Taiwan	25°12′10″N 121°39′45″E	1981	2023
Latina	153	Italy	41°25′31″N 12°48′25″E	1963	1987
Maanshan	1,872	Taiwan	21°57′29″N 120°45′6″E	1984	2025
Mülheim-Kärlich	1,219	Germany	50°24′29″N 07°29′24″E	1986	1988
Neckarwestheim	1,435	Germany	49°02′30″N 09°10′30″E	1976	2023
Palisades	805	United States	42°19′22″N 86°18′52″W	1971	2022
Philippsburg	2,292	Germany	49°15′09″N 08°26′11″E	1979	2019
Pilgrim	677	United States	41°56.7′N 70°34.7′W	1972	2019
Rancho Seco NGS	918	United States	38°20.43′N 121°7.18′W	1976	1989
Three Mile Island	1,685	United States	40°09′14″N 76°43′29″W	1974	2019
San Onofre	2,586	United States	33°22′08″N 117°33′18″W	1968	2013
Santa María de Garoña	466	Spain	42°46′31.08″N 3°12′26.25″W	1971	2017
Superphénix	1,200	France	45°45′30″N 05°28′20″E	1986	1997
Trojan	1,095	United States	46°02′18″N 122°53′06″W	1976	1992
Unterweser	1,345	Germany	53°25′40″N 08°28′49″E	1978	2011
Zion	2,080	United States	42°26′47″N 87°48′11″W	1973	1998
Zwentendorf	692	Austria	48°21′16″N 15°53′05″E	Never turned on	1985

== Gallery of power plants ==
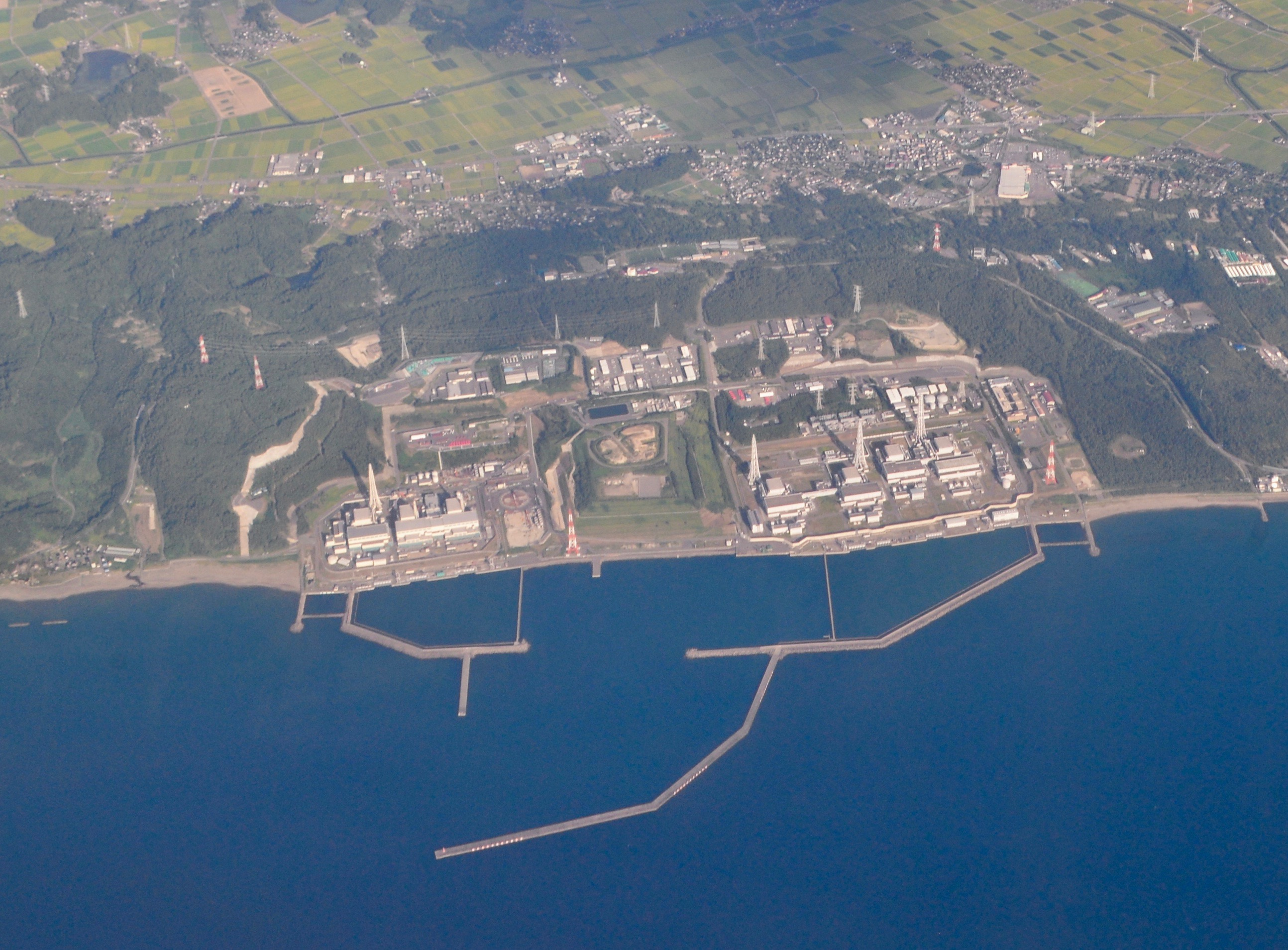
Aerial view of the Kashiwazaki-Kariwa Nuclear Power Plant

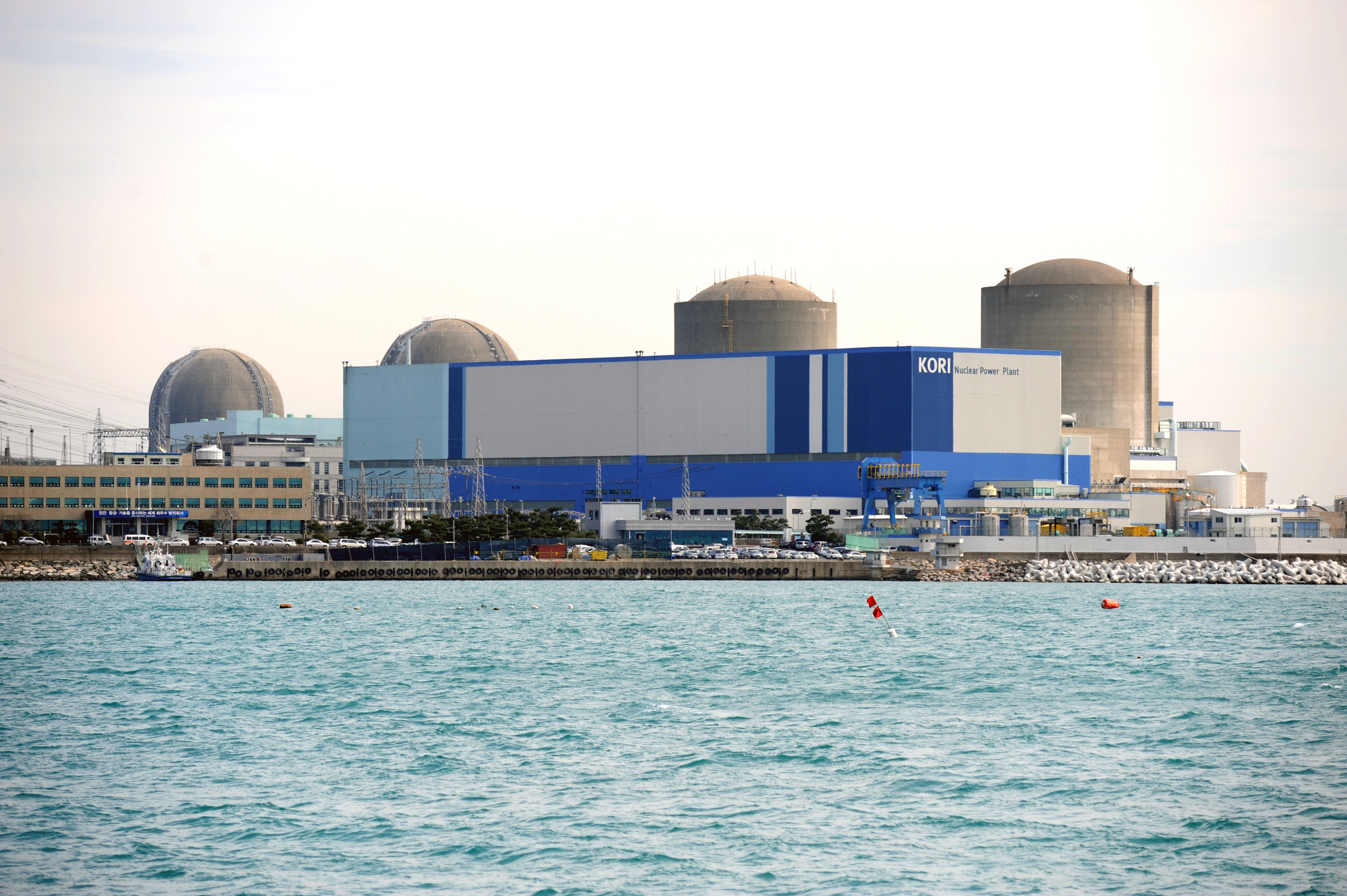
The Kori Nuclear Power Plant

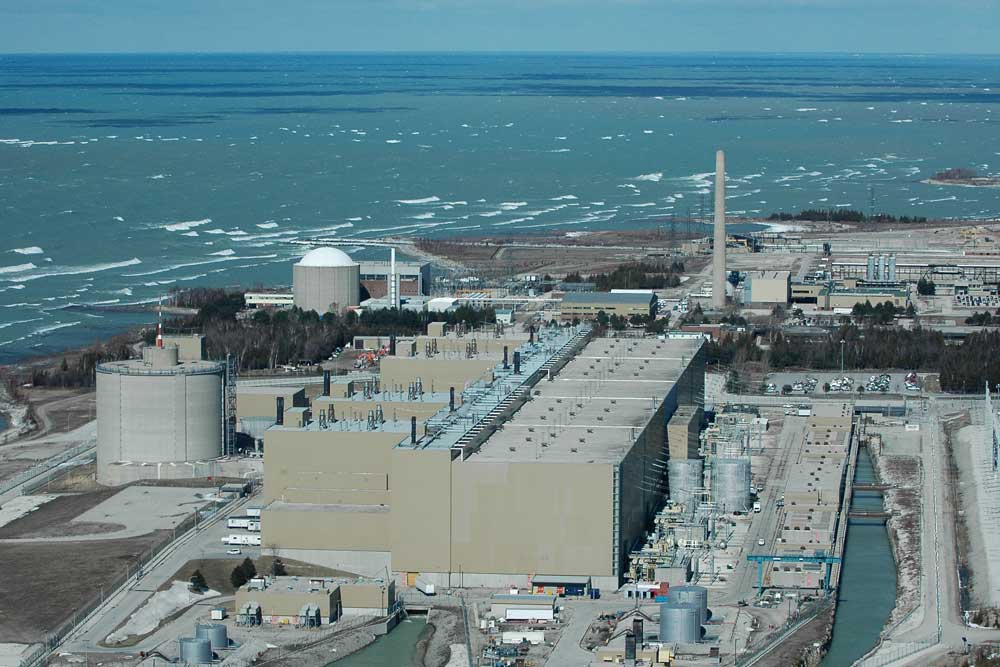
The Bruce Nuclear Generating Station, the world's largest fully operational nuclear power facility

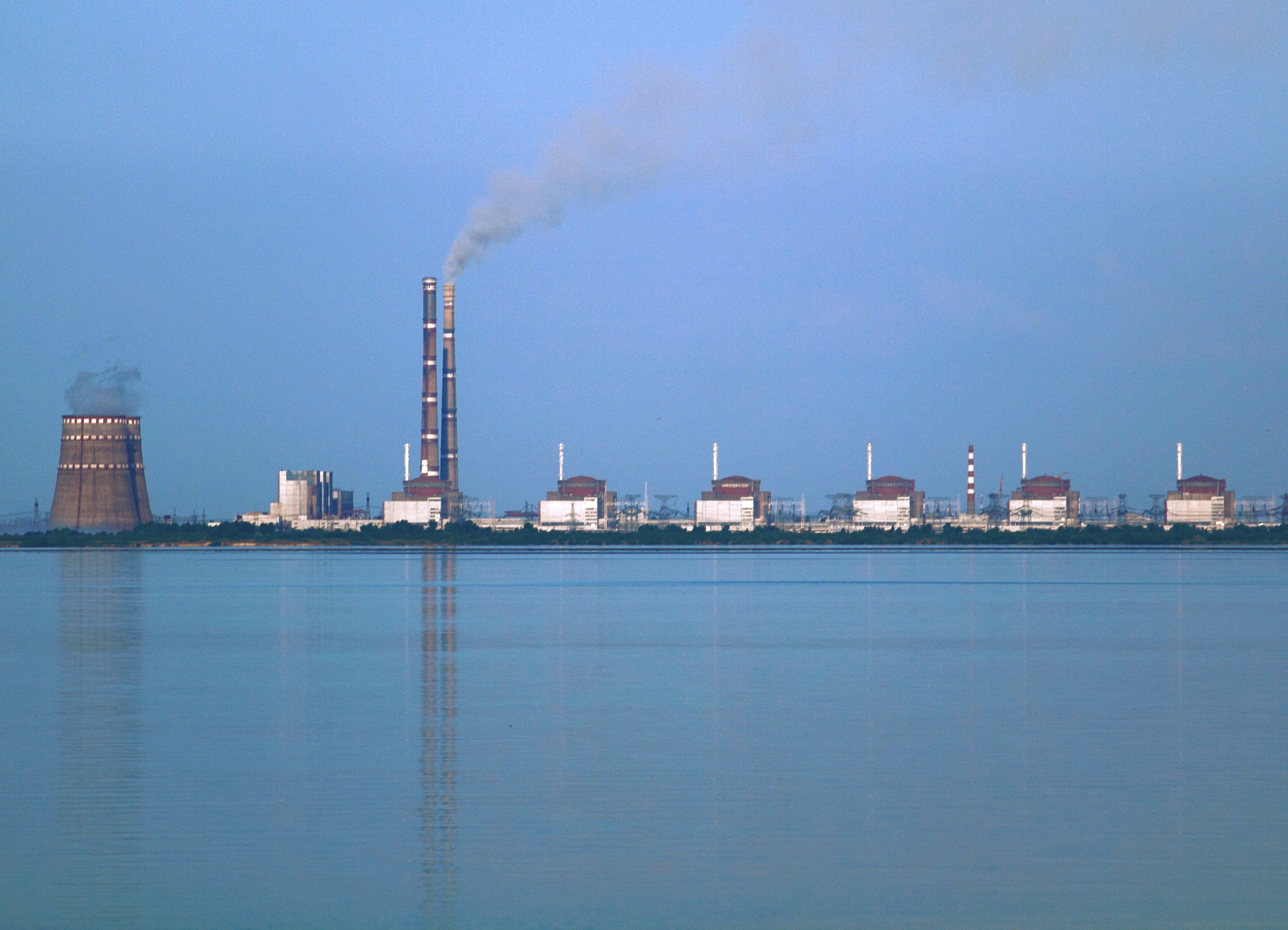
The Zaporizhzhia Nuclear Power Plant

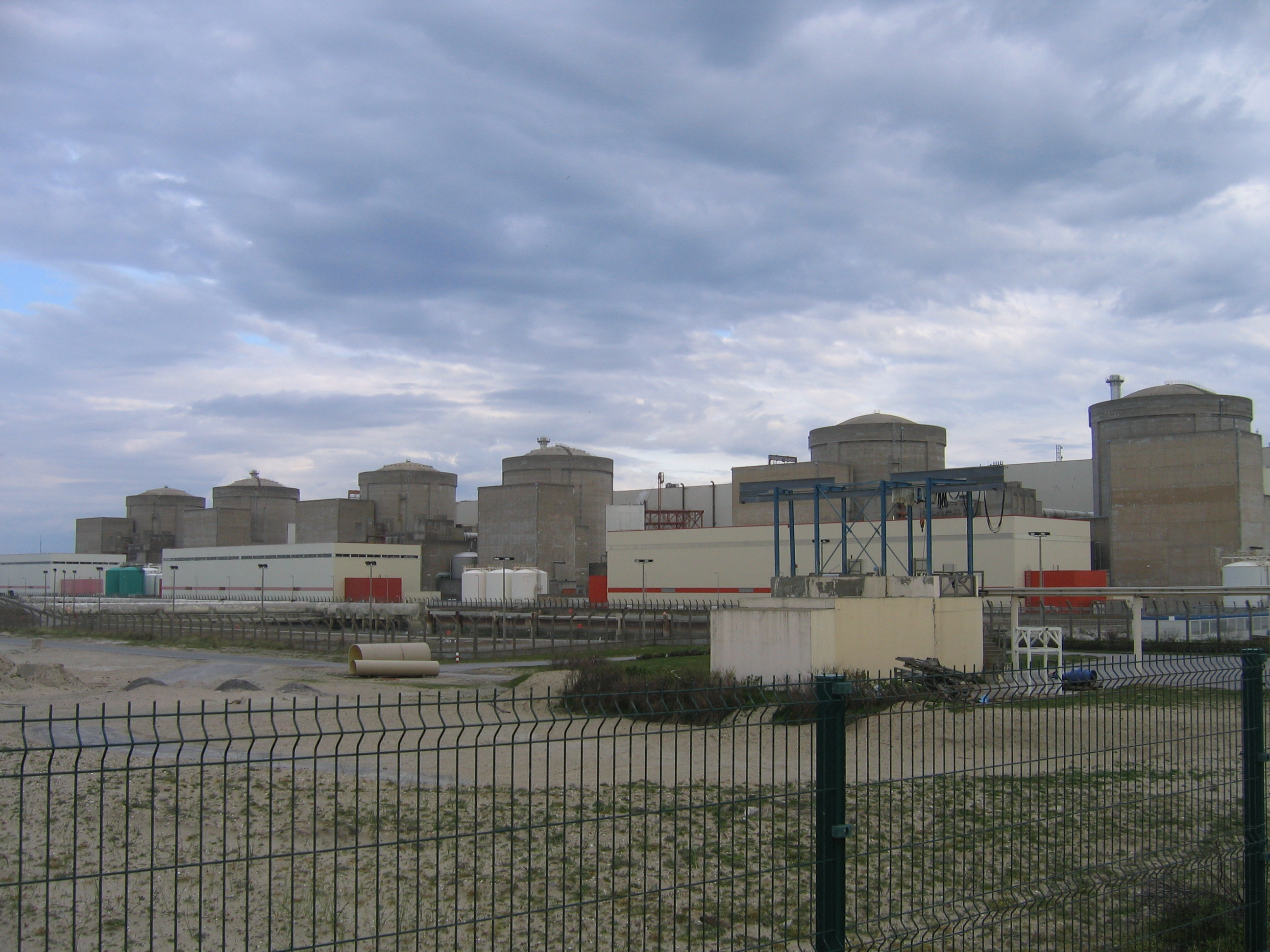
The Gravelines Nuclear Power Station

The Cattenom Nuclear Power Plant

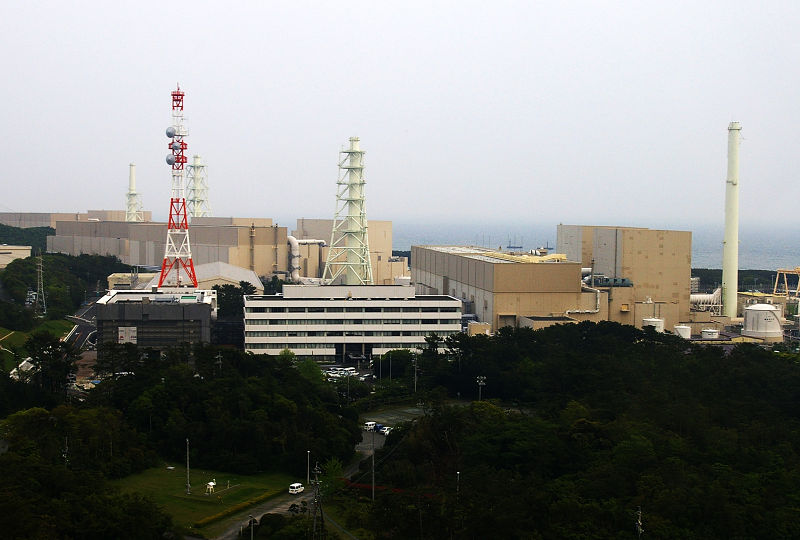
The Hamaoka Nuclear Power Plant

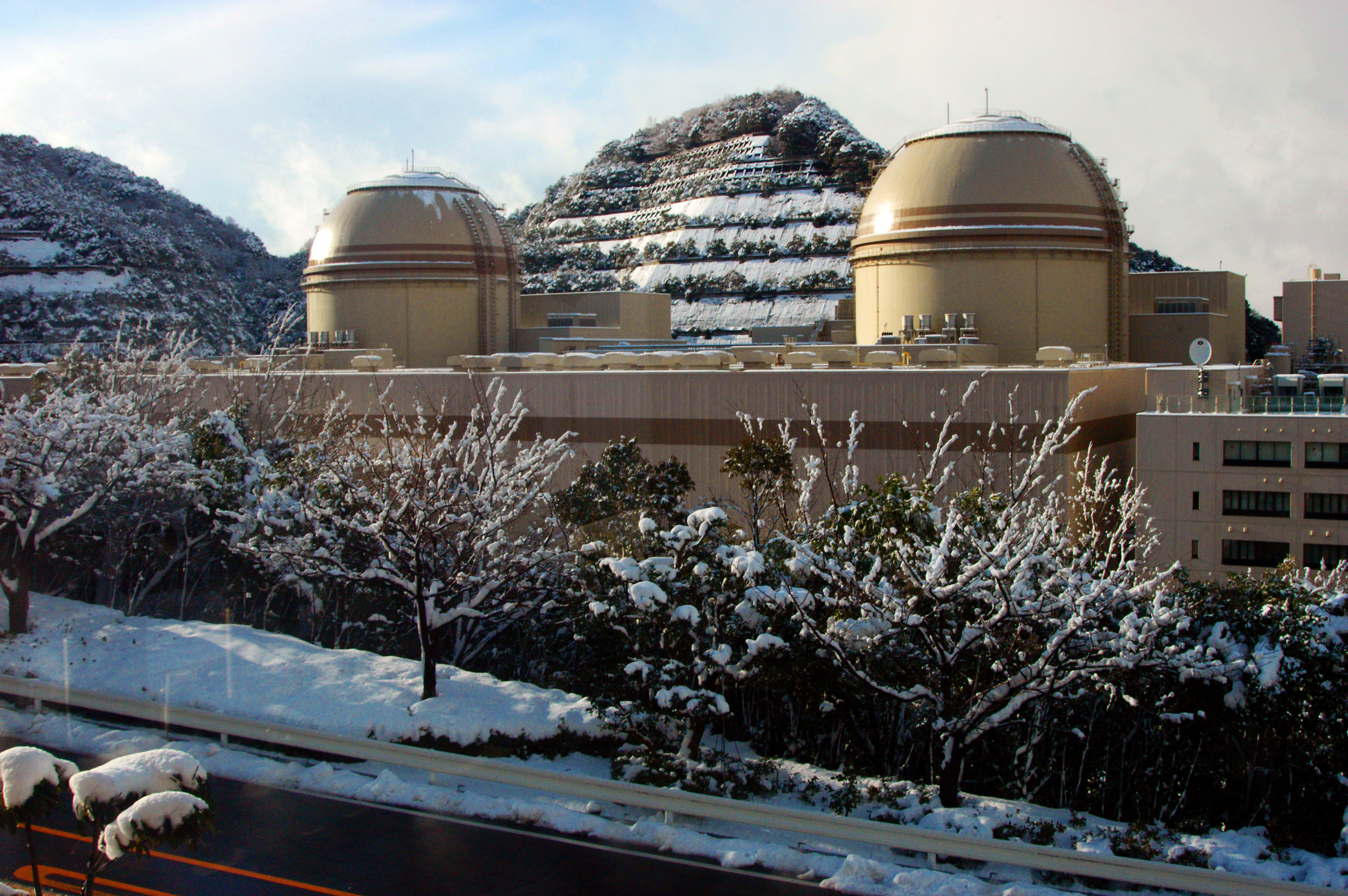
The Ōi Nuclear Power Plant

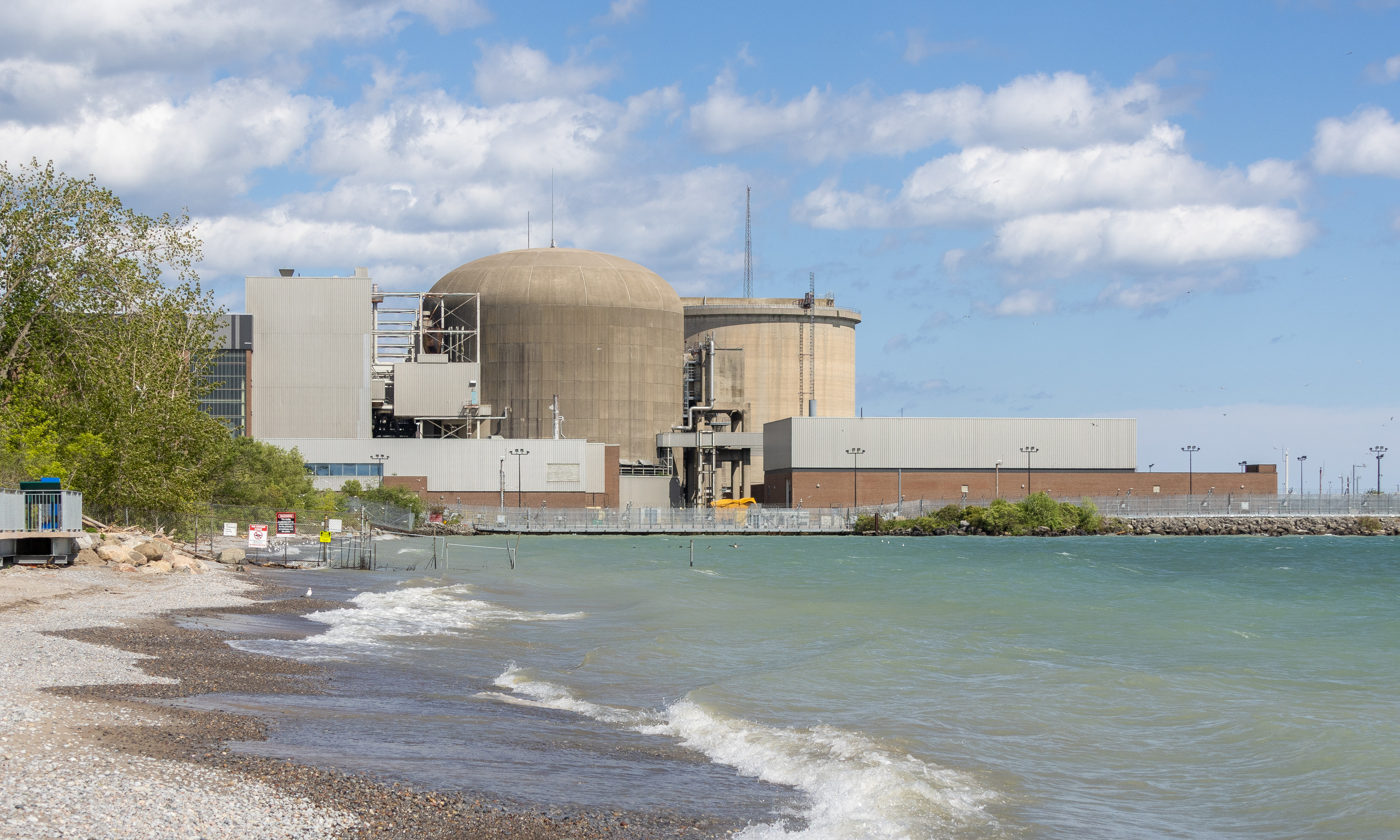
The Pickering Nuclear Generating Station

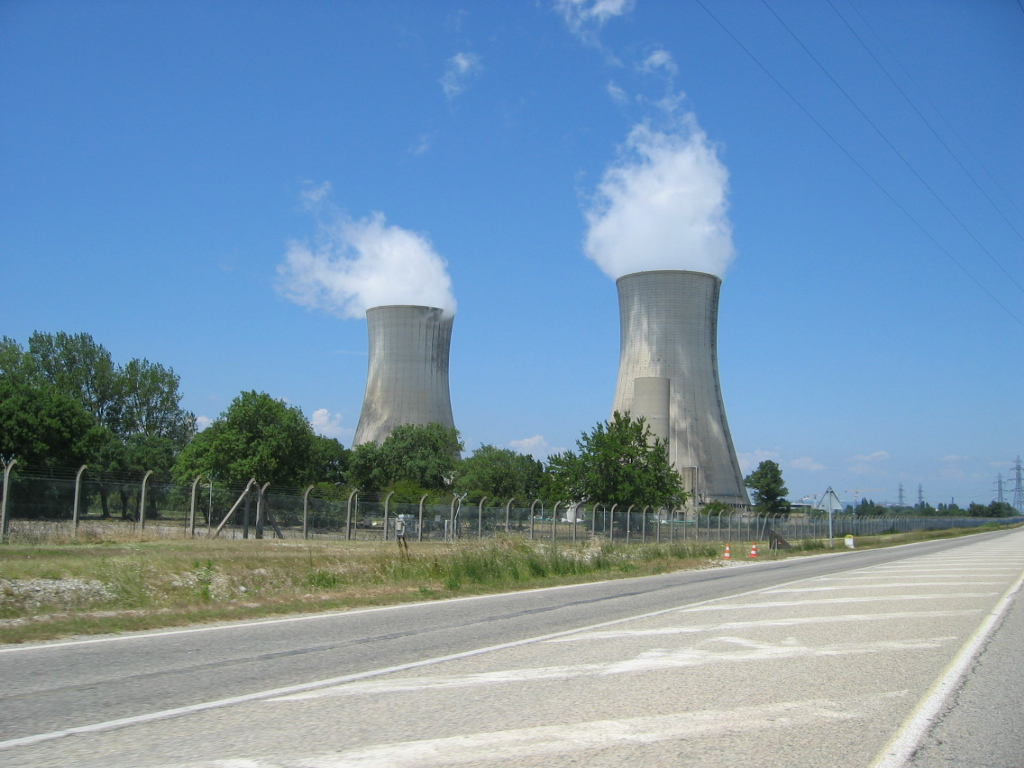
The Tricastin Nuclear Power Center

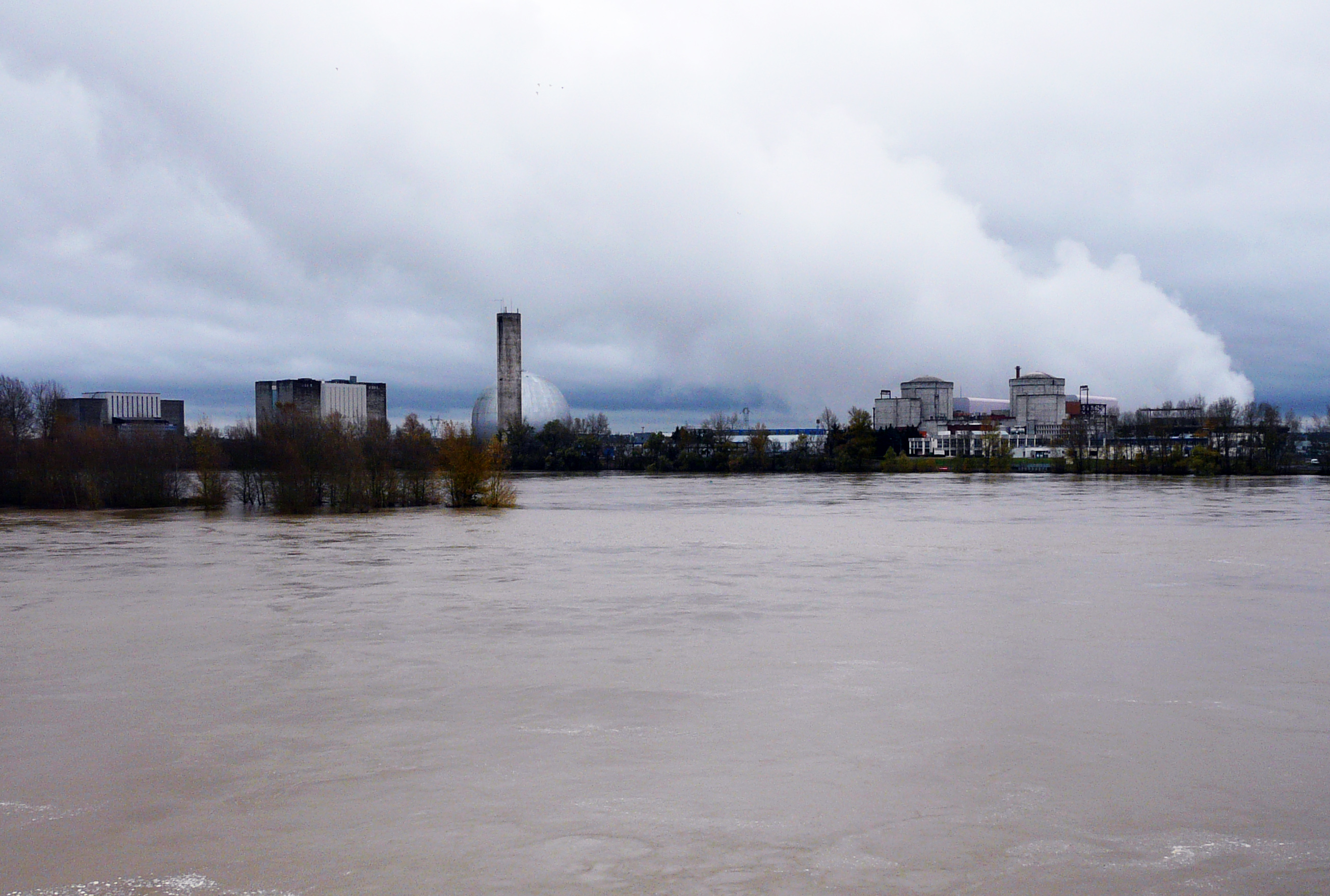
The Chinon Nuclear Power Plant

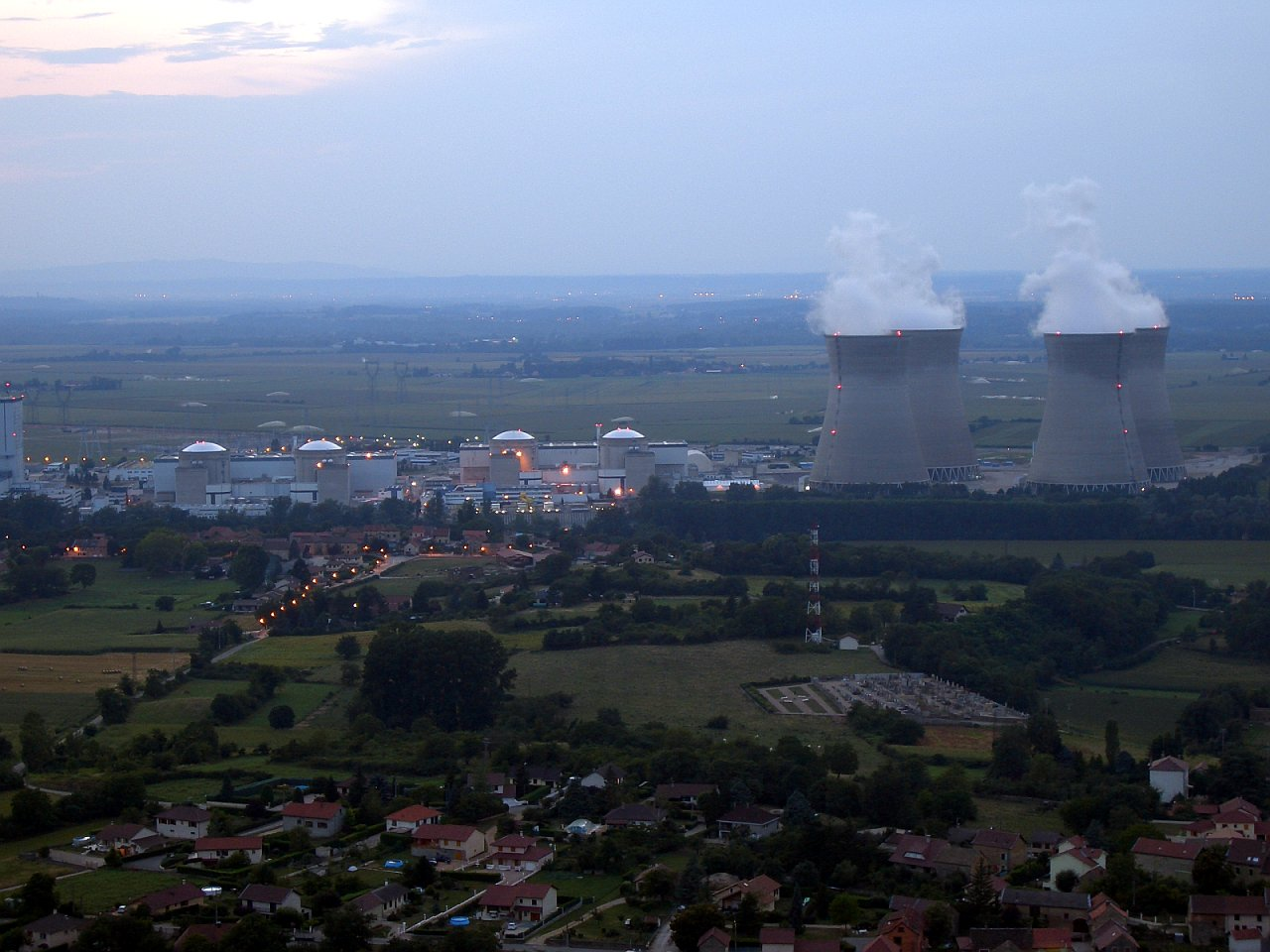
The Bugey Nuclear Power Plant

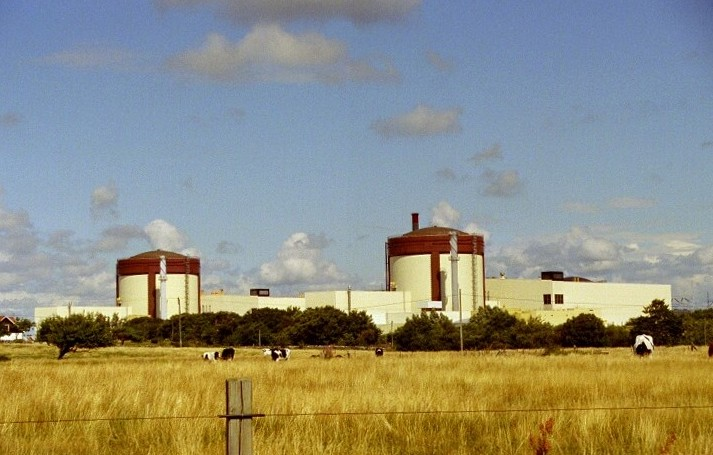
The Ringhals Nuclear Power Plant

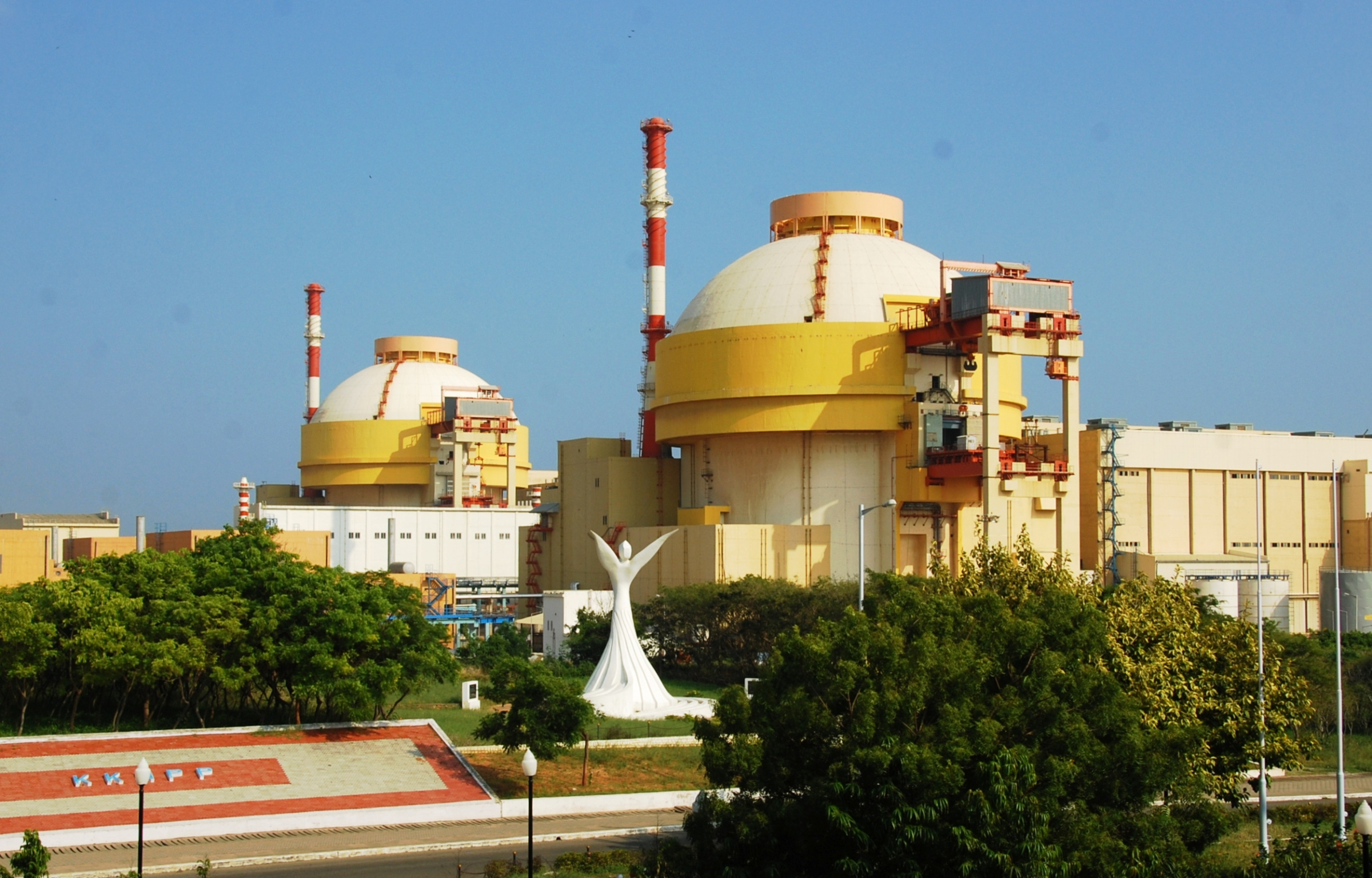
The Kudankulam Nuclear Power Plant

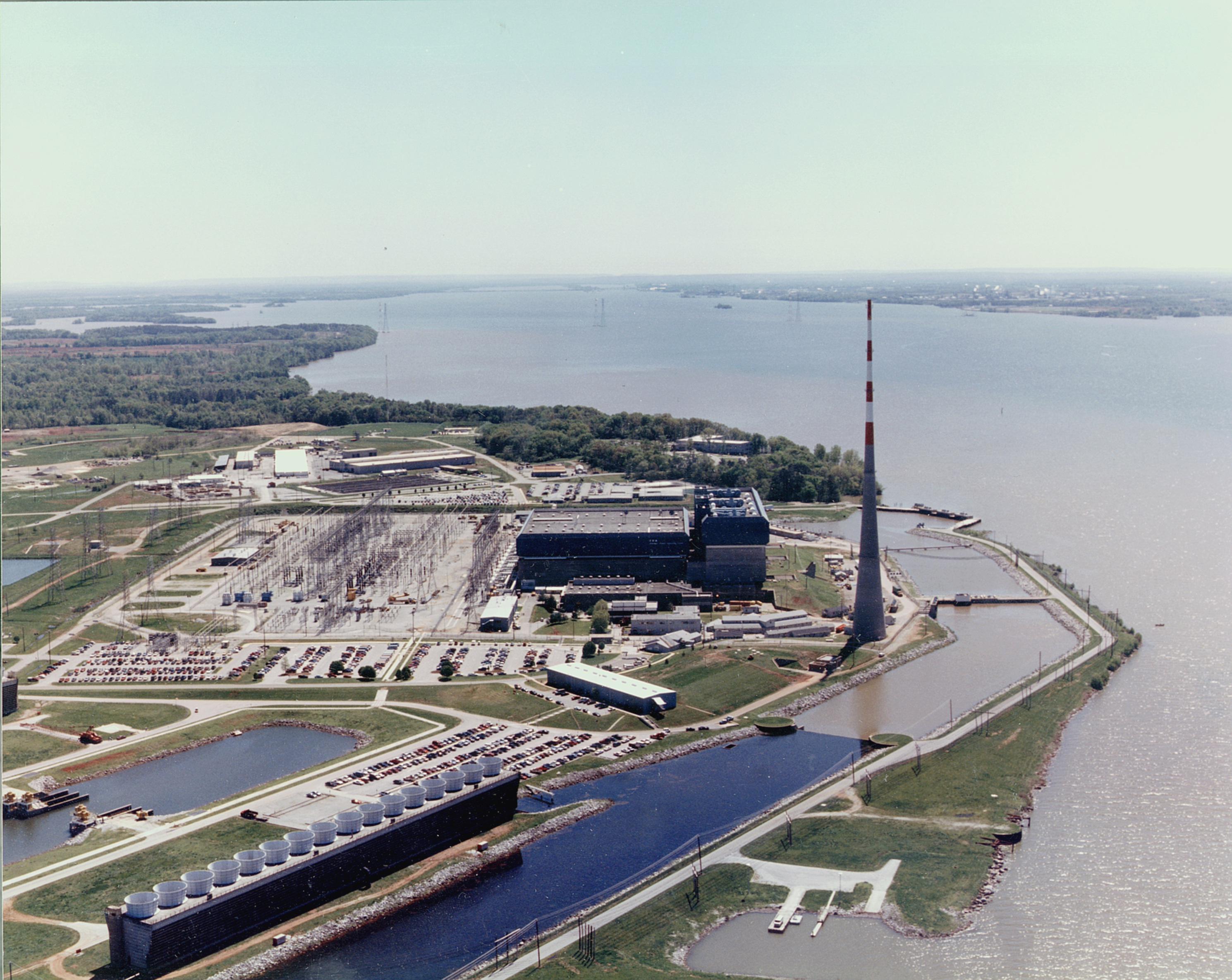
The Browns Ferry Nuclear Power Plant

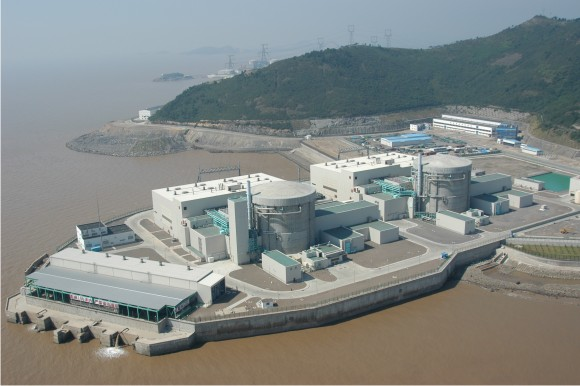
The Qinshan Nuclear Power Plant

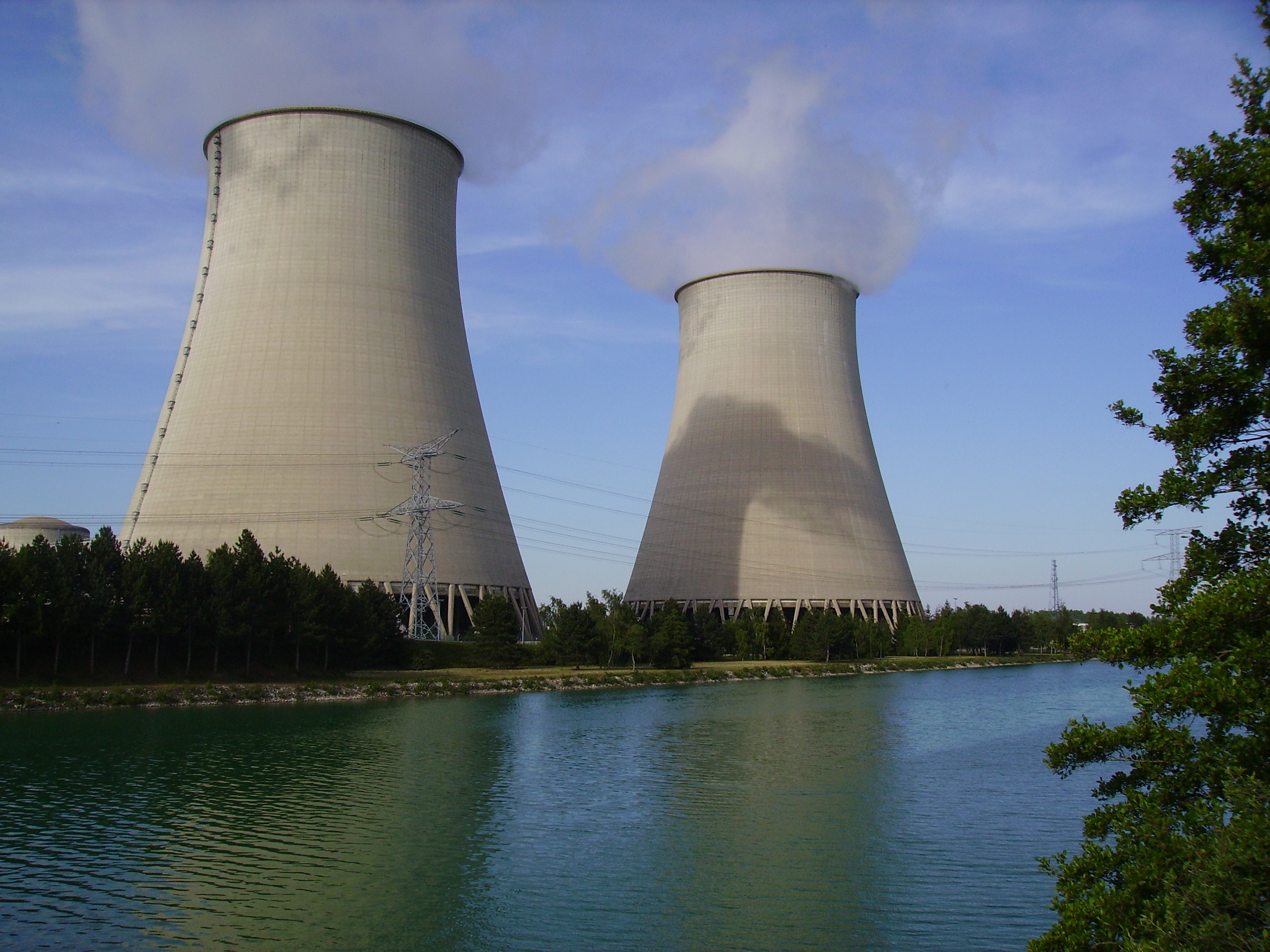
The Nogent Nuclear Power Plant

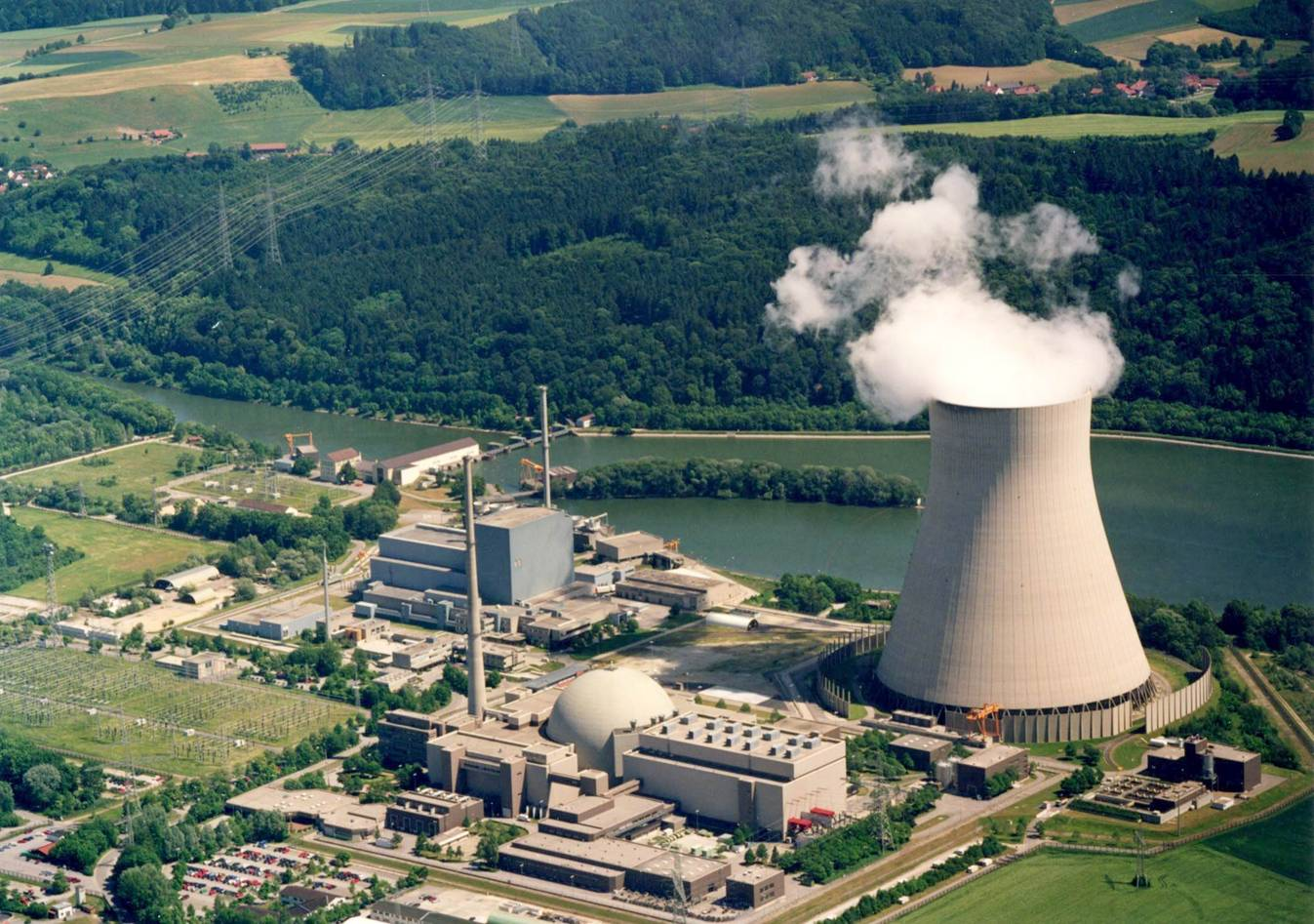
The Isar Nuclear Power Plant

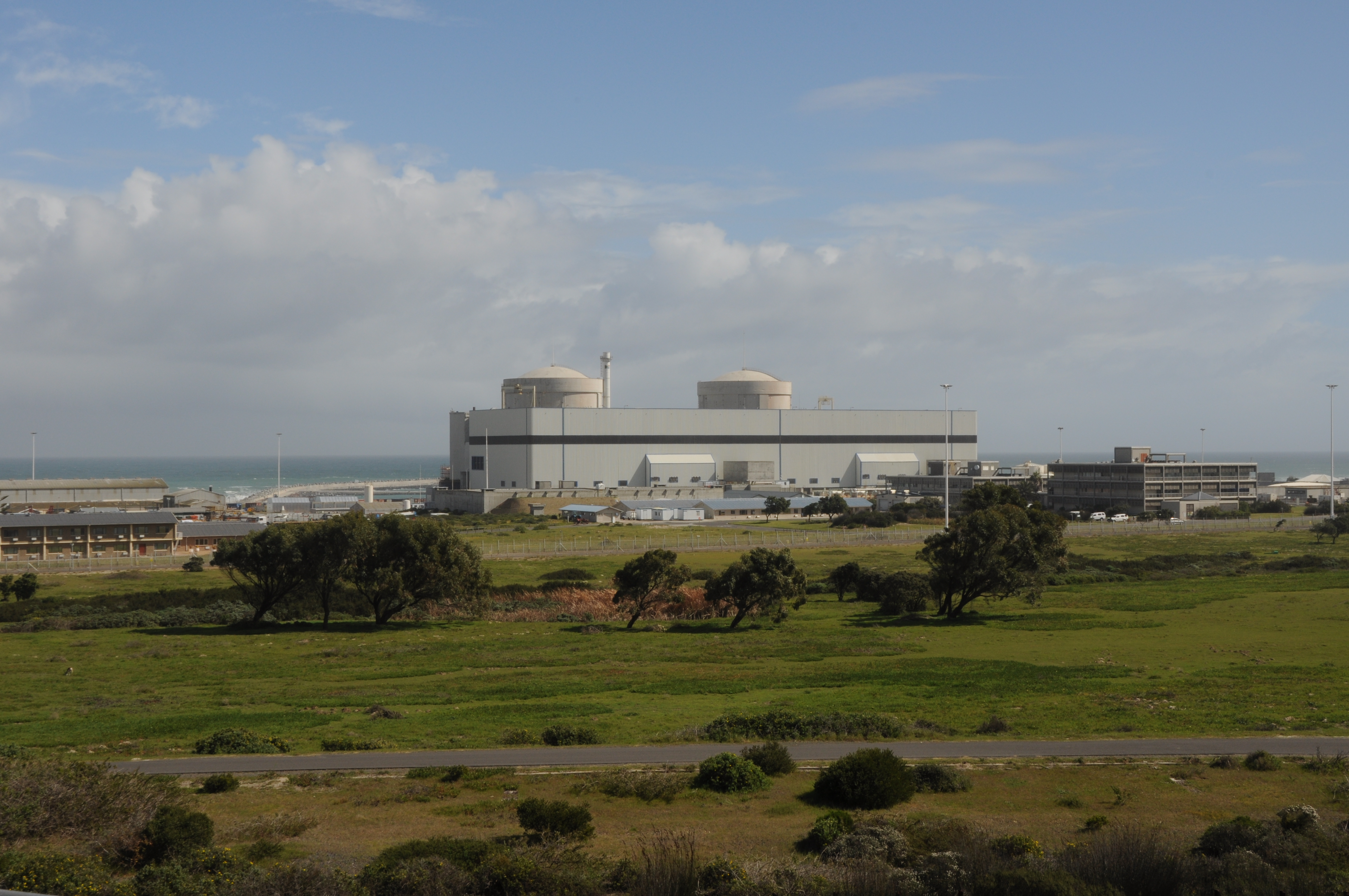
The Koeberg Nuclear Power Station

== See also ==
- List of nuclear reactors — shows individual reactors and dates
- List of boiling water reactors
- List of small modular reactor designs
- Lists of nuclear disasters and radioactive incidents
- Nuclear power by country
