= China General Nuclear Power Group =

Chinese state-owned company

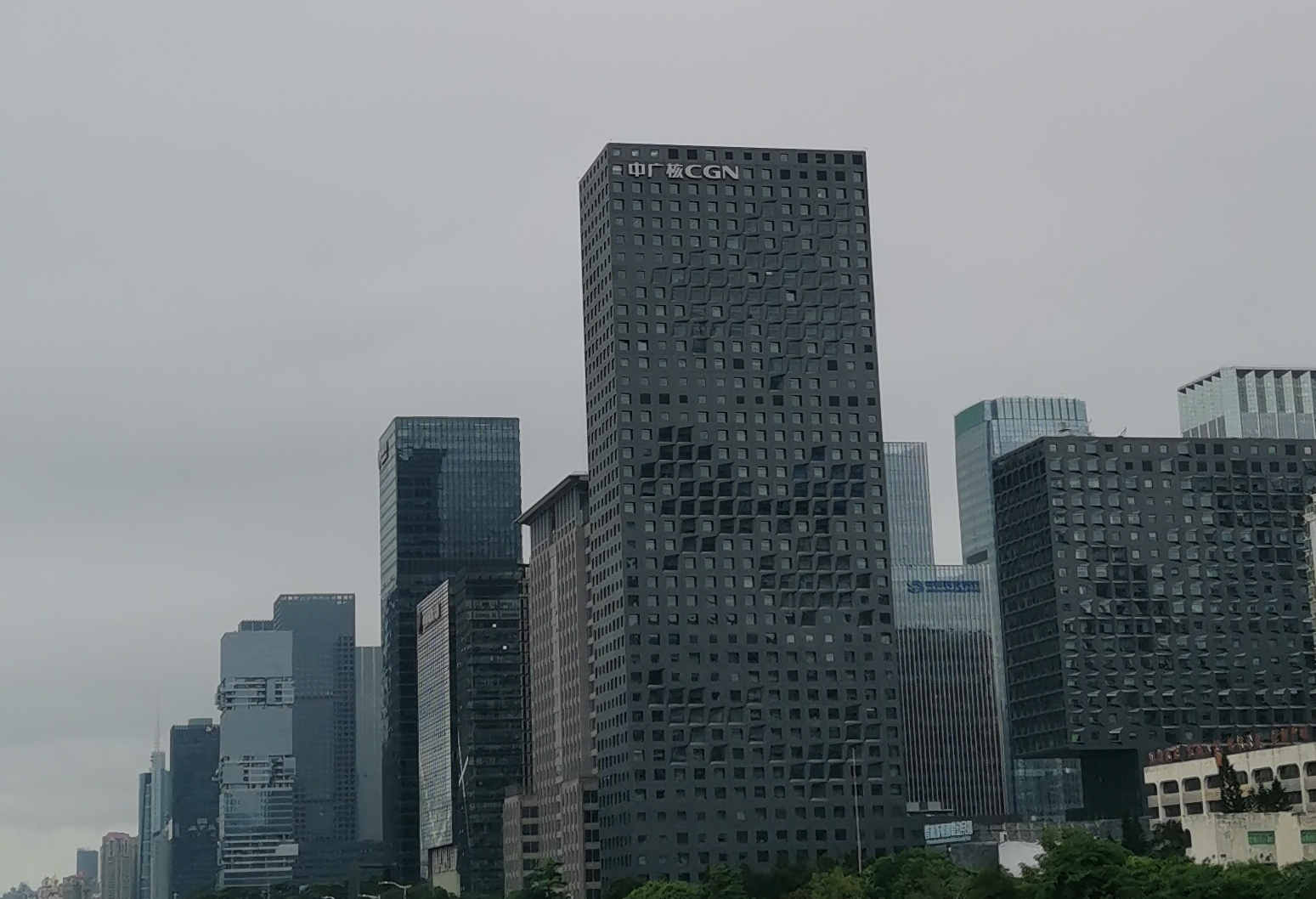
- CGN Tower, the headquarters of CGN Group
- Native name: 中国广核集团
- Company type: State-owned enterprise
- Industry: Energy
- Predecessor: China Guangdong Nuclear Power Group
- Founded: September 1994
- Headquarters: Shenzhen, Guangdong, China
- Area served: Mainland China; Malaysia
- Key people: He Yu (Chairman); Zhang Shanming (President)
- Services: Nuclear power, wind power, solar power, hydropower
- Owner: Chinese state Hengjian Holding (10%)
- Website: www.cgnpc.com.cn

China General Nuclear Power Group (CGN) (Chinese: 中国广核集团), formerly China Guangdong Nuclear Power Group (中国广东核电集团), is a Chinese state-owned energy corporation under the State-owned Assets Supervision and Administration Commission of the State Council (SASAC). As of 2024, CGN is China's biggest domestic nuclear power operator (with more than 50% of the domestic market) and is the world's largest nuclear power construction company.

In China, CGN operates nuclear plants at Daya Bay Nuclear Power Plant, Ling Ao Nuclear Power Plant, Hongyanhe Nuclear Power Plant and Ningde Nuclear Power Plant, with five new nuclear power stations under construction and another two planned. CGN operates in wind energy and solar energy, as well as hydroelectricity.

== History ==
China Guangdong Nuclear Power Holding Co., Ltd. (CGNPC) was established in 1994 with a registered capital of RMB 10.2 billion with nuclear power as its core business. With CGNPC as its core enterprise, China Guangdong Nuclear Power Group (CGNPG) comprises more than twenty wholly owned or controlling subsidiaries. It is one of the two most significant companies in China's nuclear power industry and uranium mining (the other is China National Nuclear Corporation).

The enterprise was significant in the planning for Daya Bay Nuclear Power Plant. China Guangdong Nuclear Power Group's initial focus was to manage Daya Bay and focus on the business in Guangdong.

In 2005, Qian Zhimin was promoted to chairman and Chinese Communist Party Committee Secretary of the company. Qian's strategy was to position the company as a "clean power company, with nuclear power as its core industry." During his tenure, it started its first wind energy project in Jilin (2006). hydropower projects in Sichuan (2006) and Guangxi (2008), and its first solar energy project in Gansu (2009).

In April 2009, a fund run by China Guangdong Nuclear Power Group signed a deal raising US$1.03 billion for nuclear and related energy projects. Guangdong Nuclear's fund, the first industrial fund set up by a state-owned enterprise with approval from the State Council signed the fund-raising agreement with Bank of China, China Development Bank and other institutions, which will become shareholders in the fund. The financing is the first of two phases for the fund, which plans to raise a total of 10 billion yuan.

Consistent with the Go Out policy and the Hu Jintao administration's emphasis on energy security, Qian sought for the company to acquire mining assets both foreign and domestic to improve the security of its supply chain. As the company's business expanded, Qian re-organized its structure so that assets of similar types would be combined and placed in subsidiaries directly beneath CGN's holding company. Qian also established new nuclear technology development subsidiaries and created a research institute in conjunction with China Huaneng Group and the Chinese Academy of Sciences. Qian then transferred the company's wind power assets into the research institute and merged CGN's hydropower assets into a single CGN subsidiary. Qian left the company in 2010.

In 2010, General Manager He Yu was promoted to become the enterprise's new chairman and Party Secretary. During He's tenure, nuclear development in China had slowed as part of the reaction to Japan's Fukushima nuclear accident. He increased the company's focus on nonnuclear energy sources, particularly wind and solar power. He also increased the company's commercial activity in foreign markets. In support of the company's "going out", He established foreign branches and locally incorporated companies in South Africa, France, and United Kingdom. He's tenure included a more decentralized approach to market expansion, in which subsidiaries were encouraged to look for potential business opportunities, especially foreign business opportunities.

In May 2013, the organization changed its name to China General Nuclear Power Group (CGN) to signify that its operations extend beyond Guangdong province.

In December 2014, CGN raised $3 billion by an initial public offering (IPO) in Hong Kong.

In December 2014, the firm announced it was acquiring three wind farms in the UK with a combined capacity of 73 megawatts from British energy company EDF Energy for a fee estimated to be in the region of £100 million.

In November 2015, the company and its subsidiaries agreed to acquire 1Malaysia Development Berhad's energy assets, worth around $2.3 billion. The transaction was part of the wider 1Malaysia Development Berhad scandal which resulted in billions of dollars being stolen from the Government of Malaysia and the arrest of Malaysian Prime Minister Najib Razak for corruption and fraud.

In 2020, He Yu's tenure at CGN ended.

CGN is a state-owned enterprise supervised by the State Council via the State-Owned Assets Supervision and Administration Commission. As of 2024, CGN is China's biggest domestic nuclear power operator (with more than 50% of the domestic market) and is the world's largest nuclear power construction company.

=== U.S. sanctions ===
CGN has been sanctioned by the United States, which states that CGN has attempted to acquire advanced U.S. nuclear technology to divert to military uses in China.

In 2016, the United States Department of Justice charged CGN with stealing nuclear secrets from the United States. The Guardian reported: "According to the US Department of Justice, the FBI has discovered evidence that China General Nuclear Power (CGN) has been engaged in a conspiracy to steal US nuclear secrets stretching back almost two decades. Both CGN and one of the corporation's senior advisers, Szuhsiung Ho, have been charged with conspiring to help the Chinese government develop nuclear material in a manner that is in clear breach of US law."

In August 2019, the U.S. Department of Commerce added CGN to its Entity List, barring U.S. companies from selling products to CGN. In its reasoning, the United States Department of Commerce explained that CGN attempted to acquire advanced U.S. nuclear technology to divert to military uses in China". The Chinese state-owned China Daily claimed that, "[T]he real aim is to try to thwart the country's 'Made in China 2025' and was part of the US-China trade war". In November 2020, Donald Trump issued an executive order prohibiting any American company or individual from owning shares in companies that the United States Department of Defense has listed as having links to the People's Liberation Army, which included CGN. CGN's proposals to operate two nuclear plants in the UK have received criticism from MPs as a potential threat to national security. In September 2021, the Nuclear Regulatory Commission suspended shipments of nuclear materials to CGN on national security grounds.

== Reactor designs ==
CGN's first nuclear station uses reactors designed and built by the French National Company, Framatome, specifically the M310 plants at Daya Bay Plant.

=== CPR-1000 ===
On the basis of the M310, CGN developed an improved Generation II pressurized water reactor called CPR-1000. CPR-1000 takes a large proportion in all the reactors being built in China. The M310 uses as its base design units 5 & 6 of the Gravelines Nuclear Power Station in France.

The CPR-1000 has a 1086 MWe capacity, a three-loop design and 157 fuel assemblies (active length 12ft), enriched to 4.5% U-235. The fuel assembly design is AREVA's 17x17 AFA 3G M5, which can be fabricated in China. Other features include has a design life that could extend beyond 40 years and an 18-month fuel cycle. It has a digital instrumentation and control system, and is equipped with hydrogen recombiners and containment spray pumps.

Some CPR-1000 intellectual property rights are retained by Areva, which limits overseas sales potential.

=== ACPR-1000 ===
In 2010, CGNPG announced a further design evolution to a Generation III level, the ACPR-1000, which would also replace intellectual property right-limited components from the CPR-1000. CGNPG aimed to be able to independently market the ACPR-1000 for export by 2013. CGNPG has been conducting the development work in cooperation with Dongfang Electric, Shanghai Electric, Harbin Electric, China First Heavy Industries and China Erzhong.

The core of the ACPR1000 comprises 157 fuel assemblies (active length 14ft) and has a design life of 60 years. Other features include a core catcher and double containment as additional safety measures and ten major technical improvements over its predecessor the CPR-1000. It was the first Chinese reactor to have a domestically developed digital control system.

=== Hualong One ===
In 2012, central planners in Beijing directed China General Nuclear (CGN) and the other large nuclear builder and operator, CNNC to 'rationalise' their Generation III reactor design programs. This meant CGN's ACPR1000 and CNNC's ACP1000, both of which were based on the French Generation II M310, were 'merged' into one standardised design - the Hualong One. After the merger, both companies retain their own supply chain and their versions of the Hualong One will differ slightly (units built by CGN will retain some features from the ACPR1000) but the design is considered to be standardised. Some 85% of its components will be made domestically.

The Hualong One power output will be 1170 MWe gross, 1090 MWe net, with a 60-year design life, and would use a combination of passive and active safety systems with a double containment. It has a 177 assembly core design with an 18-month refuelling cycle. The power plant's utilisation rate is as high as 90%. CNNC has said its active and passive safety systems, double-layer containment and other technologies meet the highest international safety standards.

=== Hualong Two ===
As of 2021, CNNC planned to start building Hualong Two by 2024. It will be a more economical version using similar technology, taking a year less to build with about a quarter less in construction costs.

=== EPR ===
In November 2007, CGN signed a contract with Areva to build Taishan nuclear station with Areva's EPR, making the company among the first to build a nuclear station with generation III reactors.

== Nuclear stations ==
Operating stations:

1. Daya Bay Nuclear Power Plant,
2. Ling Ao Nuclear Power Plant,
3. Ningde Nuclear Power Plant phase I,
4. Hongyanhe Nuclear Power Plant phase I,
5. Yangjiang Nuclear Power Station,
6. Taishan Nuclear Power Plant,

Under construction: Hongyanhe Nuclear Power Plant phase II, Ningde Nuclear Power Plant phase II,

Planned: Lufeng Nuclear Power Plant, Xianning Nuclear Power Plant (entering early construction), Wuhu Nuclear Power Plant and Jiangsu's Second Nuclear Power Project

== See also ==
- Nuclear power in China
