= Guangdong Nuclear Power Station =

Guangdong Nuclear Power Station may refer to:

- Ling Ao Nuclear Power Plant, Dapeng, Shenzhen
- Daya Bay Nuclear Power Plant, Daya Bay, Shenzhen
