= Hong Kong Nuclear Investment Company =

Hong Kong financing company

Hong Kong Nuclear Investment Company Limited 香港核電投資有限公司
- Company type: subsidiary
- Industry: financial services
- Founded: 1983
- Headquarters: Kowloon, Hong Kong
- Area served: Hong Kong
- Services: equity investment in nuclear power plant
- Owner: CLP Holdings (100%)
- Parent: CLP Holdings
- Website: Official website

Hong Kong Nuclear Investment Company
- Traditional Chinese: 香港核電投資有限公司
- Simplified Chinese: 香港核电投资有限公司
Transcriptions
Standard Mandarin
- Hanyu Pinyin: Xiānggǎng Hédiàn Tóuzī Yǒuxiàn Gōngsī
Yue: Cantonese
- Jyutping: hoeng1 gong2 hat6 din6 tau4 zi1 jau5 haan6 gung1 si1

The Hong Kong Nuclear Investment Company Limited (HKNIC; Chinese: 香港核電投資有限公司) is a company in Hong Kong. It is a wholly owned subsidiary company of CLP Holdings Limited. The company invests in Guangdong Nuclear Power Joint Venture Company Limited which owns the Daya Bay Nuclear Power Plant in Guangdong, supplying 25% of Hong Kong electricity demand.

== History ==
HKNIC was founded in 1983 in British Hong Kong as the subsidiary of China Light and Power Company Limited (CLP Power) to invest in nuclear power in Guangdong, across the border in China. In January 1985, HKINC signed a contract with Guangdong Nuclear Investment Company Limited to form the Guangdong Nuclear Power Joint Venture Company Limited, to be the owner and operator of Daya Bay Nuclear Power Plant.

In 2003, Guangdong Nuclear Power Joint Venture Company Limited formed the Daya Bay Nuclear Power Operations and Maintenance Company Limited with Ling Ao Nuclear Power Company Limited to operate the Daya Bay Nuclear Power Plant and Ling Ao Nuclear Power Plant in Guangdong.

== Activities ==
HKNIC regularly holds public outreach programs, such as public visits to Daya Bay Nuclear Power Plant, publication of technical pamphlets, public exhibition on nuclear energy and school talks.

== See also ==
- Nuclear energy in Hong Kong
- Electricity sector in Hong Kong
- CLP Group
