= Nuclear energy in Hong Kong =

Energy in Hong Kong, China

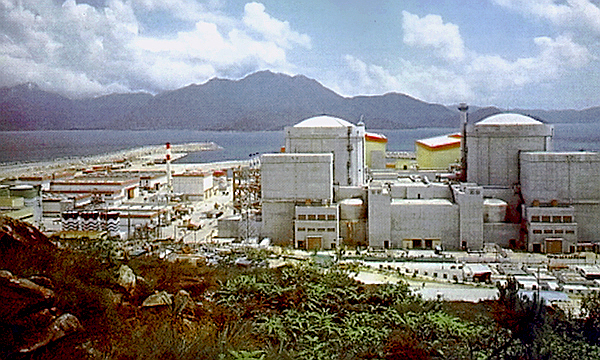
Daya Bay Nuclear Power Plant in Guangdong supplying electricity to Hong Kong since 1994

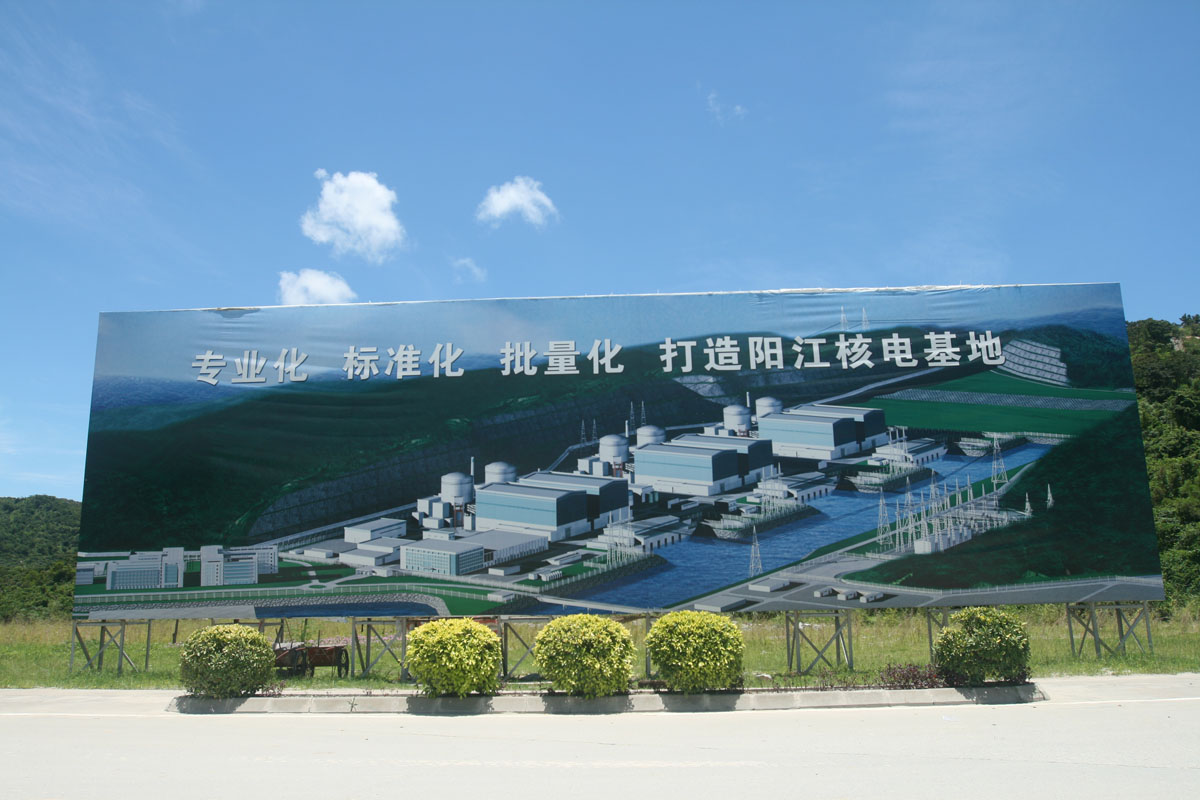
Yangjiang Nuclear Power Station in Guangdong will supply electricity to Hong Kong in 2017

Currently, there are no nuclear power plants in Hong Kong. However, a Hong Kong company, Hong Kong Nuclear Investment Company (HKNIC), owns 25% share in Daya Bay Nuclear Power Plant in Guangdong. About 80% of the power plant electricity output is supplied to Hong Kong by their electric utility company China Light and Power Co., Ltd. (CLP) to meet the electricity demand in Hong Kong.

== Electricity import from nuclear power plants in China ==
Hong Kong currently imports electricity from Mainland China from the Daya Bay Nuclear Power Plant in Guangdong since 1994. The agreement of electricity import lasts until 2034. CLP will also import 17% of electricity from the planned Yangjiang Nuclear Power Station in Guangdong by 2017 under the agreement with China Guangdong Nuclear Power Company.

== Carbon emission mitigation ==
To reduce the carbon dioxide emission in Hong Kong, new coal-fired power plants have not been allowed to be built anymore since 1997. The government of Hong Kong have been trying to boost the share of renewable energy, natural gas and nuclear energy for power generation in Hong Kong. The current existing coal-fired power plants will be kept on low utilization as reserve.

The government itself plan to cut carbon emission up to 50-60% from the current emission by 2020 by gradually replacing coal-based power generation with more nuclear power and other green energy.

== See also ==
- Electricity sector in Hong Kong
