= CPR-1000 =

Chinese nuclear reactor design

The CPR-1000, or CPR1000 (Chinese PWR) is a Generation II+ pressurized water reactor, based on the French 900 MWe three cooling loop design (M310) imported in the 1980s, improved to have a slightly increased net power output of 1,000 MWe (1080 MWe gross) and a 60-year design life.

The CPR-1000 is built and operated by the China General Nuclear Power Group (CGNPG), formerly known as China Guangdong Nuclear Power. Progressively more Chinese manufactured components were used in the units; the second unit built had 70% of its equipment manufactured in China, with a 90% Chinese content target for later builds.

== Construction ==
On 15 July 2010, China's first CPR-1000 nuclear power plant, Ling Ao-3, was connected to the grid, having started criticality testing on 11 June 2010. It started commercial operations on 27 September 2010, with Ling Ao-4 starting commercial operation on 7 August 2011.

18 CPR-1000 reactors have been built as of December 2019. Besides Ling Ao unit 3 & 4, the CPR-1000 reactor has been realised in Fangchenggang (unit 1 & 2), Fangjiashan (unit 1 & 2), Hongyanhe (unit 1–4), Ningde (unit 1–4), Yangjiang (unit 1–4).

== Design ==
On the basis of the M310, CGN developed an improved Generation II pressurized water reactor called CPR-1000. CPR-1000 takes a large proportion in all the reactors being built in China. The M310 uses as its base design units 5 & 6 of the Gravelines Nuclear Power Station in France.

The CPR-1000 has a 1086 MWe capacity, a three-loop design and 157 fuel assemblies (active length 12 ft), enriched to 4.5% U-235. The fuel assembly design is AREVA's 17x17 AFA 3G M5, which can be fabricated in China. Other features include has a design life that could extend beyond 40 years and an 18-month fuel cycle. It has a digital instrumentation and control system, and is equipped with hydrogen recombiners and containment spray pumps.

The original M310 reactors at Daya Bay and Ling Ao Phase 1 are sometimes also called CPR-1000s, but these are closely based on the French 900 MW_{e} design (M310), with net power output below 1,000 MW_{e}, and using mostly imported components.

Some CPR-1000 intellectual property rights are retained by Areva, which limits overseas sales potential. However the Financial Times reported in 2010 that Areva was considering marketing the CPR-1000 as a smaller and simpler second-generation reactor design alongside its larger EPR, for countries that are new to nuclear power. In January 2012, CGNPG agreed a partnership with Areva and EDF to develop a reactor based on the CPR-1000, which may create a design converged with Mitsubishi and Areva's 1000 MWe Atmea reactor.

CNP-1000 is a similar 3-loop-design by CNNC, but with a different reactor core.

== ACPR-1000 ==
In 2010, CGNPG announced a further design evolution to a Generation III level, the ACPR-1000, which would also replace intellectual property right-limited components from the CPR-1000. CGNPG aimed to be able to independently market the ACPR-1000 for export by 2013. CGNPG has been conducting the development work in cooperation with Dongfang Electric, Shanghai Electric, Harbin Electric, China First Heavy Industries and China Erzhong.

The core of the ACPR1000 comprises 157 fuel assemblies (active length 14 ft) and has a design life of 60 years. Other features include a core catcher and double containment as additional safety measures and ten major technical improvements over its predecessor the CPR-1000. It was the first Chinese reactor to have a domestically developed digital control system. Unit 5 and 6 at Tianwan Nuclear Power Plant are similarly classified as ACPRs.

Yangjiang 5 was the first construction of an ACPR-1000 reactor, starting in late 2013. It began commercial operation in July 2018.

== ACPR-1000+ ==
Following the Fukushima nuclear disaster, a revised design called at the time ACPR-1000+ was described. Features include double containment to protect against external explosions and airplanes, improved seismic capability to 0.3 g, increased core thermal margins and improved operation systems. The gross power output has been increased to 1150 MWe. The ACPR-1000+ was envisaged for export from 2014.

== Merger of ACP-1000 and ACPR-1000 into Hualong One ==
Since 2011, CNNC has been progressively merging its ACP-1000 nuclear power station design with the CGN ACPR-1000 design, while allowing some differences, under direction of the Chinese nuclear regulator. Both are three-loop designs originally based on the same French M310 design used in Daya Bay with 157 fuel assemblies, but went through different development processes (CNNC's ACP-1000 has a more domestic design with 177 fuel assemblies while CGN's ACPR-1000 is a closer copy with 157 fuel assemblies). In early 2014, it was announced that the merged design was moving from preliminary design to detailed design. Power output will be 1150 MWe, with a 60-year design life, and would use a combination of passive and active safety systems with a double containment. CNNC's 177 fuel assembly design was retained.

Initially the merged design was to be called the ACC-1000, but ultimately it was named Hualong One. In August 2014 the Chinese nuclear regulator review panel classified the design as a Generation III reactor design, with independently owned intellectual property rights. As a result of the success of the merger, ACP-1000 and ACPR-1000 designs are no longer being offered.

== See also ==
- Generation II reactor
- Generation III reactor
- Nuclear power
- Nuclear power in China
