= Yangjiang Nuclear Power Station =

Nuclear power plant in Guangdong, China

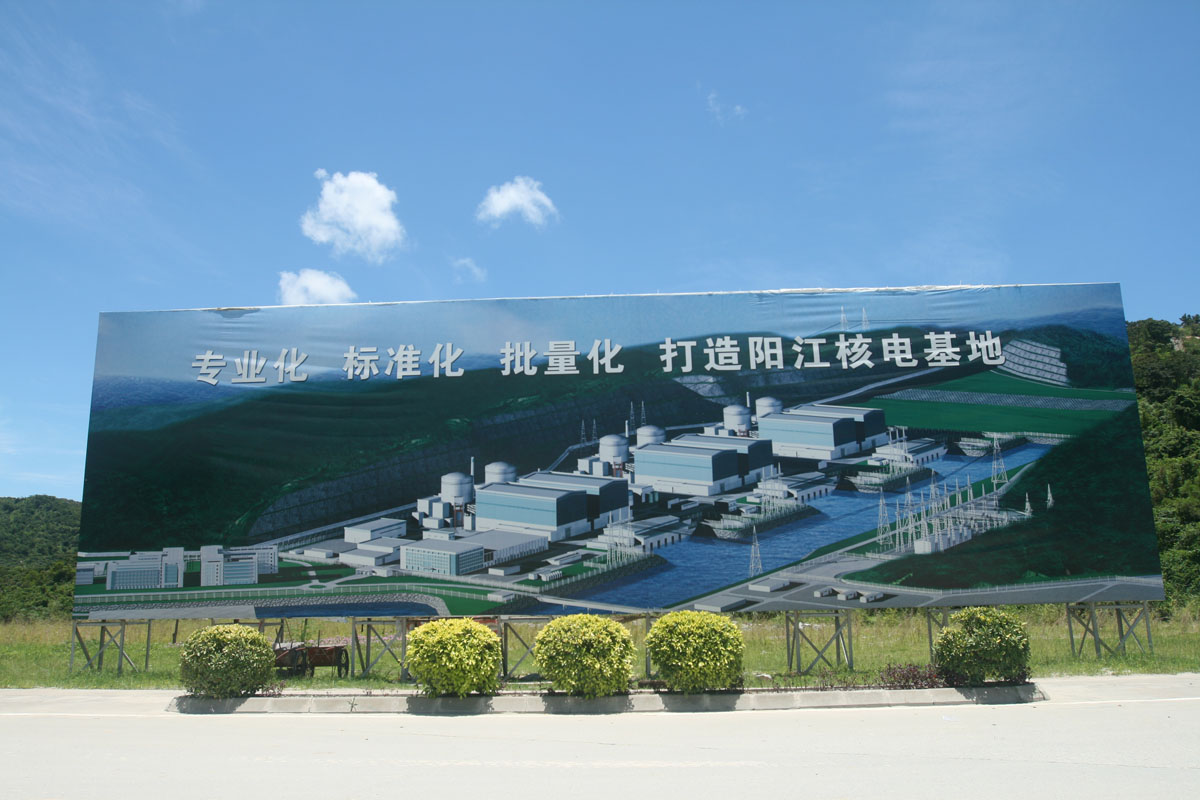
- A billboard image of the power plant, 2009
- Official name: 阳江核电站
- Country: People's Republic of China
- Location: Dongpingzhen, Yangjiang, Guangdong
- Coordinates: 21°42′30″N 112°15′40″E
- Status: Operational
- Construction began: Unit 1: December 16, 2008; Unit 2: June 4, 2009; Unit 3: November 15, 2010; Unit 4: November 17, 2012; Unit 5: September 18, 2013; Unit 6: December 23, 2013
- Commission date: Unit 1: December 31, 2013; Unit 2: March 10, 2015; Unit 3: October 18, 2015; Unit 4: January 8, 2017; Unit 5: May 23, 2018; Unit 6: June 29, 2019
- Construction cost: CNY 70 billion (US$10.2 billion)
- Owner: Guangdong Nuclear Power Joint Venture Company (GNPJVC)
- Operator: Yangjiang Nuclear Power Company

Nuclear power station
- Reactors: 6
- Reactor type: PWR
- Thermal capacity: 6 × 2905 MW_{th}

Power generation
- Units operational: 6 × 1000 MW
- Make and model: CPR-1000 (Units 1–4); ACPR-1000 (Units 5–6)
- Nameplate capacity: 6000 MW
- Capacity factor: 2021: Unit 1: 90.5%; Unit 2: 100.3%; Unit 3: 89.1%; Unit 4: 91.1%; Unit 5: 93.6%; Unit 6: 97.3%; Lifetime: Unit 1: 90.0%; Unit 2: 89.0%; Unit 3: 87.3%; Unit 4: 85.0%; Unit 5: 85.9%; Unit 6: 84.0%
- Annual net output: 49,215.06 GWh (177,174.2 TJ) (2021)

External links
- Commons: Related media on Commons

The Yangjiang Nuclear Power Station (YNPS; simplified Chinese: 阳江核电站; traditional Chinese: 陽冮核電站; pinyin: Yángjiāng Hédiànzhàn) is a nuclear power plant in Guangdong province, China. The site is Dongping Town, Yangjiang City in western Guangdong Province. The station has six 1,000 megawatt (MW) CPR-1000 pressurized water reactors (PWRs). The plant began commercial operation in March 2014, and as of 2019 is the largest nuclear power station in China.

== History ==
The site in Yangjiang was selected for nuclear development in 1988. The project was approved in 2004.

The plant was originally to be one of the first in China to host Generation III reactors — specifically AP1000 reactors. In 2007 however, plans were revised from the AP1000 design to EPR design. Later in 2007 these plans were again revised, with the EPR designs to be realized at Taishan, and the established CPR-1000 reactor design (as already used at Ling Ao) selected for Yangjiang.

Ground was broken for the plant in February 2008; the first concrete for the first unit was poured on 16 December 2008. Construction of the fourth unit was to begin in March 2011, but was delayed by China's safety review in reaction to the nuclear catastrophe in Fukushima; the first concrete was poured in November 2012. The sixth unit began commercial operation in July 2019.

== Domestic development ==
The CPR-1000 is a PWR design developed by China from the Areva-designed PWRs at the Daya Bay Nuclear Power Plant. Yangjiang marks a step in the development of China's domestic nuclear industry. Shu Guogang, GM of China Guangdong Nuclear Power Project said, "We built 55 percent of Ling Ao Phase 2, 70 percent of Hongyanhe, 80 percent of Ningde and 90 percent of Yangjiang Station."

== ACPR-1000 reactor type ==
Yangjiang 5 is the first construction of an ACPR-1000 reactor, starting in September 2013. This design is an evolution to the Generation III level of the CPR-1000, and includes a core catcher and double containment as additional safety measures. Yangjiang 5 was the first Chinese reactor to have a domestically-developed digital control system.

== Reactor data ==
Unit	Model	Net power (MW_{e})	Gross power (MW_{e})	Thermal power (MW_{t})	Construction start	First criticality	Grid connection	Operation start	Notes
Phase I
1	CPR-1000	1000	1086	2905	2008-12-16	2013-12-23	2013-12-31	2014-03-25	
2	CPR-1000	1000	1086	2905	2009-06-04	2015-03-02	2015-03-10	2015-06-05	
3	CPR-1000+	1000	1086	2905	2010-11-15	2015-10-11	2015-10-18	2016-01-01	
4	CPR-1000+	1000	1086	2905	2012-11-17	2016-12-30	2017-01-08	2017-03-15	
Phase II
5	ACPR-1000	1000	1086	2905	2013-09-18	2018-05-16	2018-05-23	2018-07-12	
6	ACPR-1000	1000	1086	2905	2013-12-23	2019-06-22	2019-06-29	2019-07-24	

== See also ==
- Nuclear power in China
- Generation III reactor
- List of nuclear reactors § China
