= Ningde Nuclear Power Plant =

Nuclear power plant in Ningde, China

- Official name: 宁德核电站
- Country: People's Republic of China
- Location: Fuding, Ningde, Fujian
- Coordinates: 27°2′40″N 120°17′0″E
- Status: Operational
- Construction began: 2008
- Commission date: December 2012
- Construction cost: US$7.6 billion (units 1–4)
- Owner: Ningde Nuclear Power Co Ltd (NDNP)

Nuclear power station
- Reactor type: CPR-1000, HPR-1000 PWRs

Power generation
- Units operational: 4 × 1018 MW
- Units planned: 1 × 1200 MW
- Units under const.: 1 × 1200 MW
- Nameplate capacity: 4072 MW

Ningde Nuclear Power Plant (simplified Chinese: 宁德核电站; traditional Chinese: 寧德核電站; pinyin: Níngdé hé diàn zhàn) is a nuclear power plant in Fujian province, China. The site is located in Beiwan village in the town of Qinyu, Fuding, Ningde, Fujian. The plant will ultimately have six gigawatt-scale pressurized water reactors (PWRs). The first reactor began operation on 18 April 2013.The Ningde Nuclear Power project was approved by the National Development and Reform Commission (NDRC) in 2007. The project is 51% funded by the Guangdong Nuclear Investment Company Ltd, with Datang International Power Generation Co and the Fujian Coal Group completing the shareholding. A total investment of 52 billion yuan (US$7.6 billion) should result in the completion of Ningde Phase I. Including the final two units of Phase II, the total cost will exceed 70 billion yuan. The four units of Phase I will generate about 30 billion kilowatt hours per year, for which the plant will charge 0.37 yuan/kW·h (11 billion yuan/year).

Ningde marks a step in the development of China's domestic nuclear industry. Shu Guogang, GM of China Guangdong Nuclear Power Project said, "We built 55 percent of Ling Ao Phase 2, 70 percent of Hongyanhe, 80 percent of Ningde and 90 percent of Yangjiang Station." Site preparation at Ningde ran through 2007, with the first concrete for Ningde 1 poured in February 2008. Ningde 2 followed nine months later. Construction of each unit is expected to take 58 months. Ningde 1 was grid connected on 28 December 2012 and entered full commercial operation on 18 April 2013.

In July 2024, first concrete was poured for Unit 5, the first of two Hualong One reactors.

== Reactor data ==
The Ningde Nuclear Power Plant consist of 4 operational reactors, 2 under construction.

| Unit | Model | Net power | Gross power | Thermal power | Start construction | First criticality | Grid connection | Commercial operation | Notes |
|---|---|---|---|---|---|---|---|---|---|
Phase I
| Ningde 1 | CPR-1000 | 1018MW | 1089MW | 2905MW | 2008-02-18 | 2012-11-24 | 2012-12-28 | 2013-04-15 | |
| Ningde 2 | CPR-1000 | 1018MW | 1089MW | 2905MW | 2008-11-12 | 2013-12-20 | 2014-01-04 | 2014-05-04 | |
| Ningde 3 | CPR-1000 | 1018MW | 1089MW | 2905MW | 2010-01-08 | 2015-03-08 | 2015-03-21 | 2015-06-10 | |
| Ningde 4 | CPR-1000 | 1018MW | 1089MW | 2905MW | 2010-09-29 | 2016-03-16 | 2016-03-29 | 2016-07-21 | |
Phase II
| Ningde 5 | Hualong One | 1200MW | | 3180MW | 2024-07-28 | | 2029 | | |
| Ningde 6 | Hualong One | 1210MW | | | 2025-12-17 | | 2030 (est.) | | |

== See also ==
- Nuclear power in China
- List of nuclear reactors#China
