= Hongyanhe Nuclear Power Plant =

Nuclear power plant in Liaoning, China

- Official name: 红沿河核电站
- Country: China
- Location: Donggangzhen, Wafangdian, Dalian, Liaoning
- Coordinates: 39°47′45″N 121°28′50″E
- Status: Operational
- Construction began: August 18, 2007
- Commission date: Unit 1: February 17, 2013; Unit 2: November 23, 2013; Unit 3: March 23, 2015; Unit 4: April 1, 2016; Unit 5: June 25, 2021; Unit 6: May 2, 2022
- Owner: Liaoning Hongyanhe Nuclear Power Company Ltd.
- Operator: Liaoning Hongyanhe Nuclear Power Company Ltd.

Nuclear power station
- Reactor type: PWR
- Thermal capacity: 6 × 2,905 MW_{t}; 17,430 MW_{t} (Total)

Power generation
- Units operational: 6 × 1,061 MW_{e}
- Make and model: CPR-1000 (Units 1-4); ACPR-1000 (Units 5-6)
- Nameplate capacity: 6,710 MW_{e} (6,366 MW_{e} net)

The Hongyanhe Nuclear Power Plant (红沿河核电站) is located in Donggang Town, Wafangdian in Liaoning Province of China. The site is within the Prefecture-level city of Dalian, 104 kilometres (65 mi) north of Dalian City proper. The first unit started commercial operations in June 2013.

Phase I consists of four CPR-1000 reactors, which is a design developed by China from the Framatome-designed PWRs at the Daya Bay Nuclear Power Plant.

Phase II is the first construction of two ACPR1000 reactors, further development of the CPR-1000. This reactor will include a core catcher and double containment as additional safety measures.

== Progress ==
The project was approved by the National Development and Reform Commission in April 2006, and projected to cost 23 billion Renminbi for the first two units. The cost will be shared between the China Power Investment Corporation, the China General Nuclear Power Group and two Liaoning companies. Liaoning Hongyanhe Nuclear Power Co., Ltd., a joint venture, is managing the construction and will be the operator of the plant once it goes online. The operator is a 45–45–10 joint venture of China Power Investment Corporation (now State Power Investment Corporation), China General Nuclear Power Group and Dalian Construction Investment Group.

Construction started in summer of 2006 with excavation of two large holes that will have the reactors put in them and a containment built around them. 'First concrete' for the first unit was poured in August 2007. 'Ground breaking' ceremony was held on 28 July 2010 for starting the work of two 1000 MWe CPR-1000 pressurized water reactors of phase II.

On 17 February 2013 Hongyanhe 1 was connected to the grid, having started criticality testing on 16 January 2013. It began commercial operation on 6 June.

On 23 November 2013 Hongyanhe 2 was connected to the grid.

Hongyanhe 4 achieved first criticality on 5 March 2016, was connected to the grid on 1 April 2016, and entered commercial operation on 20 September 2016.

The Hongyanhe Nuclear Power Station reached full operational capacity on 24 June 2022 with total installed capacity of 6,710 MW.

== Reactor Data ==
The Hongyanhe Nuclear Power Plant consists of 6 operational reactors.

Unit	Type / Model	Net el. power	Gross el. power	Thermal power	Construction start	First criticality	Grid connection	Operation start	Notes
Phase I
Unit 1	PWR / CPR-1000	1061 MW	1119 MW	2905 MW	2007-7-18	2013-1-16	2013-2-17	2013-6-6	
Unit 2	PWR / CPR-1000	1061 MW	1119 MW	2905 MW	2008-3-28	2013-10-24	2013-11-23	2014-5-13	
Unit 3	PWR / CPR-1000	1061 MW	1119 MW	2905 MW	2009-3-7	2014-10-27	2015-3-23	2015-8-16	
Unit 4	PWR / CPR-1000	1061 MW	1119 MW	2905 MW	2009-8-15	2016-3-5	2016-4-1	2016-6-8	
Phase II
Unit 5	PWR / ACPR1000	1061 MW	1119 MW	2905 MW	2015-3-29	2021-06-13	2021-06-25	2021-7-31	
Unit 6	PWR / ACPR1000	1061 MW	1119 MW	2905 MW	2015-6-24	2022-04-21	2022-05-02	2022-06-23	
