= Fangjiashan Nuclear Power Plant =

Nuclear power plant in Zhejiang, China

- Official name: 方家山核电站
- Country: People's Republic of China
- Location: Zhejiang province
- Coordinates: 30°26′29″N 120°56′30″E
- Status: Operational
- Construction began: 2008
- Commission date: 2014
- Construction cost: 26 billion yuan (US$3.8 billion)
- Owner: China National Nuclear Corporation (CNNC)
- Operator: China National Nuclear Corporation

Nuclear power station
- Reactor type: CPR-1000 PWR

Power generation
- Units operational: 2 × 1012 MW
- Nameplate capacity: 2024 MW
- Annual net output: 15,152 GWh (2016)

Fangjiashan Nuclear Power Plant (方家山核电站) is a nuclear power plant in the Zhejiang province, China, bordering the Shanghai municipality. The plant consists of two 1,080 MW CPR-1000 pressurized water reactors (PWR) at a total cost of estimated 26 billion yuan (US$ 3.8 billion).

'First concrete' for the first unit at the Fangjiashan plant was poured on 26 December 2008, construction of the second unit followed in July 2009. Construction was done by China Nuclear Power Engineering (CNPE), while the reactor pressure vessels were manufactured by China First Heavy Industries and the turbosets by Dongfang Electric. The reactors were put in commercial operation in December 2014 and February 2015, respectively.

The existing Qinshan Nuclear Power Plant with 7 reactors is nearby: essentially Fangjiashan NPP is an extension of the Qinshan NPP, forming an aggregated complex. The Fangjiashan NPP is mainly owned by CNNC (72%), with minority stakes by Zhejiang Provincial Energy Group Co Ltd.

Two units of CNNC's CNP-1000 were due to be installed at Fangjiashan Nuclear Power Plant. However, the design was subsequently changed to CGN's CPR-1000.

== Reactor data ==
The Fangjiashan Nuclear Power Plant consists of 2 operational reactors.

Unit	Type	Model	Net power	Gross power	Thermal power	Construction start	First criticality	Grid connection	Operation start	Notes
Fangjiashan 1	PWR	CPR-1000	1012 MW	1089 MW	2905 MW	2008-12-26	2014-10-21	2014-11-04	2014-12-15	
Fangjiashan 2	PWR	CPR-1000	1012 MW	1089 MW	2905 MW	2009-7-17	2014-10-21	2015-01-12	2015-02-12	

== See also ==
- Nuclear power in China
