= Harbin Electric =

Manufacturer of power plant equipment

Harbin Electric Company Limited 哈尔滨电气股份有限公司
- Company type: Public
- Traded as: SEHK: 1133
- Industry: Power plant equipment manufacturing
- Founded: 1994
- Headquarters: Harbin, Heilongjiang, China
- Area served: Worldwide
- Key people: Zou Lei (邹磊) (Chairman)
- Total assets: CNY 64.4 billion (2014)
- Parent: Harbin Electric Corporation
- Website: Harbin Electric Corporation; Harbin Electric Company Limited

Harbin Electric Company Limited, formerly Harbin Power Equipment Company Limited, is a Chinese enterprise engaged in the research and development, manufacturing and construction of power plant equipment. Along with Shanghai Electric and Dongfang Electric it is one of the three largest manufacturers of power plant equipment in China. According to Platts the company in 2009-10 was the second largest manufacturer of steam turbines by worldwide market share, tying Dongfang Electric and slightly behind Shanghai Electric.

== History ==
In October 1994, the company was formed through the restructuring of Harbin Power Plant Equipment Corporation (currently Harbin Electric Corporation). It is headquartered in Harbin, Heilongjiang and listed on the Hong Kong Stock Exchange.
