= Core catcher =

Device used to capture fuel debris in a nuclear meltdown

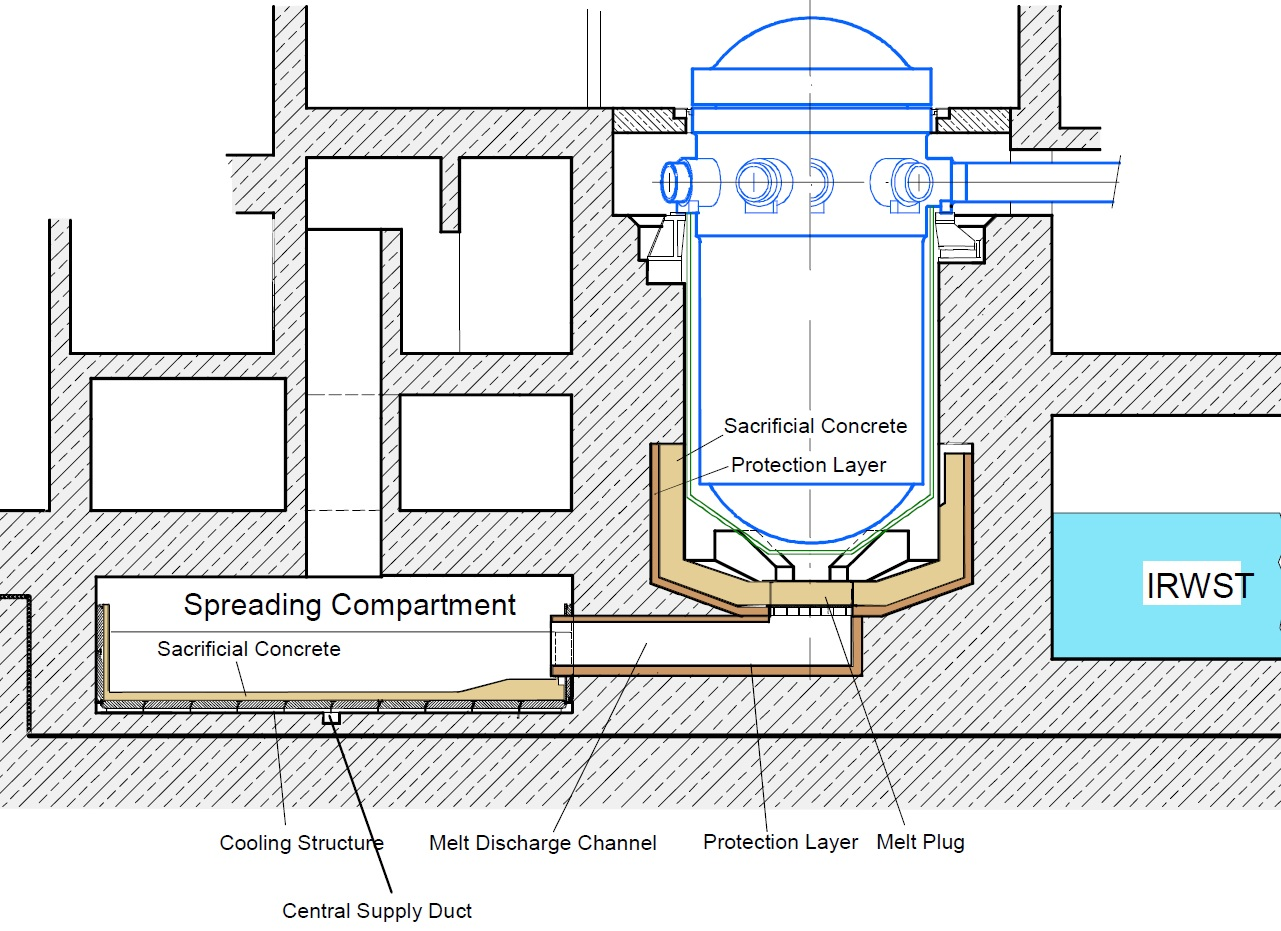
Diagram of core catcher in the European Pressurized Reactor.

A core catcher is a device provided to catch the molten core material (corium) of a nuclear reactor in case of a nuclear meltdown and prevent it from escaping the containment building.

A core catcher is made from a special thermally resistant concrete ceramic to prevent nuclear core material from melting through the core catcher; it also has a cooling mechanism to cool down the core material. The core catcher of the European Pressurized Reactor (EPR) has 170 m^{2} expansion area and a mass of 500 t.

Examples of reactor types with core catchers, besides the EPR, are:

- SNR-300 (fast breeder)
- AES-91 / VVER-1000/428
- VVER-1200 (PWR)
- SWR1000 (BWR)
- ESBWR (BWR)
- ABWR (BWR)
- APWR (PWR)
- Atmea I (PWR)
- ACPR-1000 (PWR)
- EU-APR1400 (PWR)
- IPWR-900

The AES-91, a project of Atomstroyexport based on the VVER-1000 design, was envisaged to be the first type of nuclear plant to have a core catcher directly underneath the reactor. Thus, in early 2011, the two reactors of the Chinese Tianwan Nuclear Power Plant were the only working nuclear reactors with this type of core catchers.

The Russian physicist who helped design the Russian core-catcher model during the Chernobyl crisis, Leonid Bolshov, has stressed that the experience of Chernobyl has encouraged Russia to create reactors with core-catcher safety devices in new nuclear plants.

In 2018, Rosatom installed a 200-tonne core catcher at Bangladesh's Rooppur 1 Nuclear Power Plant (planned to go into operation in 2025), describing it as "a unique protection system".
