= Daya Bay Nuclear Power Plant =

Nuclear power plant in Guangdong, China

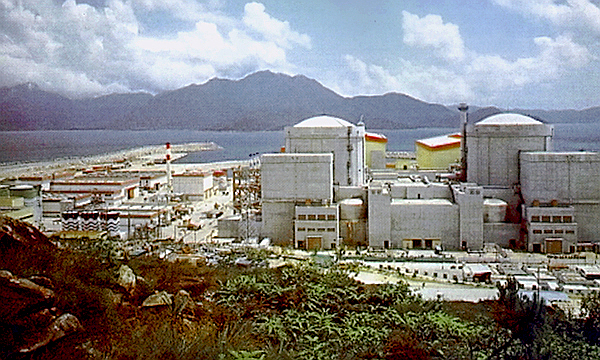
- Daya Bay Nuclear power plant
- Country: People's Republic of China
- Location: Longgang District, Shenzhen, Guangdong
- Coordinates: 22°35′50″N 114°32′40″E
- Status: Operational
- Construction began: Unit 1: August 7, 1987; Unit 2: April 7, 1988
- Commission date: Unit 1: August 31, 1993; Unit 2: February 7, 1994
Owner
Guangdong Nuclear Investment Company	(75%)
CLP Group	(25%)
- Operators: Daya Bay Nuclear Power Operations and Management Co, Ltd.

Nuclear power station
- Reactors: 2
- Reactor type: PWR
- Reactor supplier: Framatome
- Cooling source: Seawater (Daya Bay, South China Sea)
- Thermal capacity: 2 × 2905 MW_{t}
- Total electricity generated: 397.95 TWh (1,432.6 PJ) (As of the end of 2021)

Power generation
- Units operational: 2 × 944 MW_{e}
- Make and model: M310
- Nameplate capacity: 1,888 MW_{e}
- Capacity factor: 2021: Unit 1: 89.8%; Unit 2: 100.6%; Lifetime: (Up to 2021); Unit 1: 86.8%; Unit 2: 86.8%
- Annual net output: 15,742.98 GWh (56,674.7 TJ) (2021)

External links
- Website: Guangdong Daya Bay Nuclear Power Station
- Commons: Related media on Commons

Daya Bay Nuclear Power Plant
- Simplified Chinese: 大亚湾核电站
- Traditional Chinese: 大亞灣核電站
Transcriptions
Standard Mandarin
- Hanyu Pinyin: Dàyàwān Hédiànzhàn
Yue: Cantonese
- Jyutping: daai6 aa3 waan1 hat6 din6 zaam6

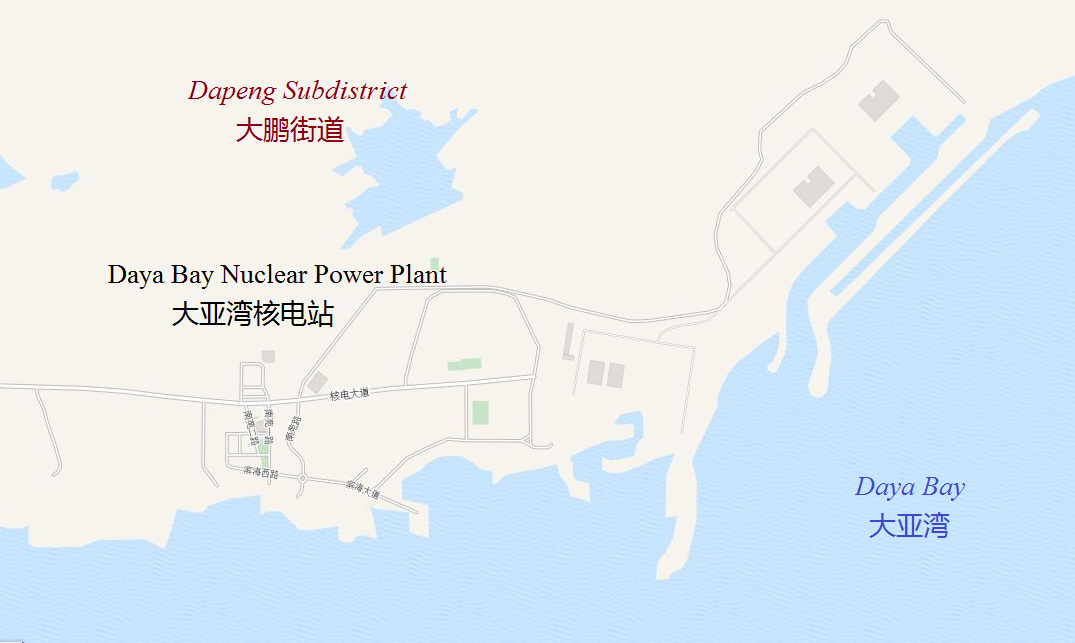
Map of Daya Bay Nuclear Power Plant

Daya Nuclear Power Plant (Chinese: 大亚湾核电站; pinyin: Dàyàwān Hédiànzhàn) is a nuclear power plant located in Daya Bay in Longgang District, along the eastern extremity of Shenzhen, Guangdong, China; and to the north east of Hong Kong. Daya Bay has two 944 MWe PWR nuclear reactors based on the Framatome ANP French 900 MWe three cooling loop design (M310), were both commissioned in 1993 and started commercial operation in 1993 and 1994 respectively.

== History ==
The Hong Kong–based British businessman and owner of CLP Power, Lawrence Kadoorie, conceived of the plan to build a nuclear plant in Guangdong province to provide electricity to both Hong Kong and Southern China. Kadoorie envisioned the plant as part of a "grand strategy" to enhance economic links with Mainland China and help to preserve British administration of Hong Kong. British Prime Minister Margaret Thatcher was enthusiastic about the plan and committed to the support of the UK Department of Industry. Chinese paramount leader Deng Xiaoping was also enthusiastic about the proposed nuclear plan. At a 1985 meeting between Deng and Kadoorie the two men expressed a desire to celebrate the planned commissioning of the first reactor in 1992, despite their advanced age.

In 1985, the building of Daya Bay nuclear power plant incited controversy and led to objections from prominent politicians in nearby Hong Kong, such as Martin Lee and Szeto Wah, legislative councillors, district board members. A million people, or one fifth of Hong Kong's population at the time, signed a petition opposing nuclear power. Over a hundred community groups brought discussion on the construction, with the opposition primarily focusing on environmental issues and the rights of Hong Kong residents.

Unit 1 began power operations on August 31, 1993, and Unit 2 was first connected to the grid on February 7, 1994. The reactors were designed and built by the French National Company, Framatome, with Chinese participation. The plants were originally named Guangdong-1 and Guangdong-2 in the IAEA PRIS database. China Guangdong Nuclear Power Group had an important role in developing the plant.

== Organisational structure ==
Daya Bay and the adjacent Ling Ao Nuclear Power Plant are operated together by Daya Bay Nuclear Power Operations and Management Co (DNMC), an affiliate of China General Nuclear Power Group (CGN).

Daya Bay is 25% owned by Hong Kong-listed CLP Group, which buys about 80% of the plant's output to supply Hong Kong's power needs. 75% is owned by Guangdong Nuclear Investment, a subsidiary of CGN.

== Incidents ==
=== Missing reinforcing bars ===
On 9 October 1987, the Hong Kong Legislative Council task force was informed that 316 steel reinforcing bars were missing from the reactor platform of Unit 1. There should have been 8080 bars in the whole structure and 576 bars in the Unit 1 reactor platform.

The incident was discovered and concealed by the operating company in September 1987. It was disclosed by a local Hong Kong newspaper in October. The concrete platform did not meet the specifications set. Company officials explained that the incident was due to a "mistaken perception" of the architectural drawings.

In the aftermath of the incident, steps were taken to remedy the missing reinforcing bars. Extra reinforcement would be applied on the second layer of concrete for the shortfall on the first of the five layers. A Hong Kong Legislative Councillor, Jackie Chan, who was a civil engineer by trade criticised attempts to downplay the issue which focused on the fact that "only 2 per cent" of the total number of bars were missing. The 316 missing bars localised to the reactor platform which would have resulted in 55 per cent reduction in the total of 576 bars.

The Bulletin of the Atomic Scientists reported the incident in 1991 with a title "Hong Kong fears Chinese Chernobyl".

=== Alleged radioactive leak ===
On June 16, 2010, Radio Free Asia informed that there was a leak in one of the fuel tubes. Officials denied this information stating that "Daya Bay's two reactor units are functioning safely and stably. There has been no radioactive leak". Radio Free Asia quoted an unidentified expert, saying that radioactive iodine had been released. They also claimed the incident had not been immediately reported to the government, and was kept secret for some time. The New York Times reported differently, quoting one of the shareholders of the plant, China Light & Power (CLP), a Hong Kong–based utility, that the government nuclear safety watchdog in both mainland China and Hong Kong were notified and briefed. CLP said in a statement that the leak was small and fell below international standards requiring reporting as a safety issue. No radioactive monitoring stations in Hong Kong detected any rise in radioactivity. Mainland China news outlets also quoted officials explaining the situation, which was considered under normal operation conditions and fell below international standards for reporting.

== Safety ==
In April 2011, Daya Bay Power Plant won an unprecedented four out of six awards in the annual nuclear power plant safety competition held by EDF Energy. "Everyone was shocked by Daya Bay's figures, especially for repairs and maintenance," said Liu Changshen, General Manager of Daya Bay Nuclear Power Company. The Daya Bay Nuclear Power Plant also stood out as its staff are exposed to a minimal amount of radiation – only 0.8 millisieverts, the equivalent to an x-ray (which 1 out 400 people get every year in the general population).

== See also ==
- Daya Bay Reactor Neutrino Experiment
- Ling Ao Nuclear Power Plant
- Nuclear power in China
- CPR-1000
- Nuclear energy in Hong Kong

== Reactor data ==
The Daya Bay Nuclear Power Plant consist of 2 operational reactors.

Unit	Type	Model	Net power	Gross power	Thermal power	Construction start	First criticality	Grid connection	Operation start	Notes
Daya Bay 1	PWR	M310	944 MW	984 MW	2905MW	1987-08-07	1993-07-28	1993-08-31	1994-02-01	
Daya Bay 2	PWR	M310	944 MW	984 MW	2905MW	1988-04-07	1994-06-21	1994-02-07	1994-05-06	
