= Ling Ao Nuclear Power Plant =

Nuclear power plant in Guangdong, China

- Official name: 岭澳核电站
- Country: China
- Location: Longgang District, Shenzhen, Guangdong
- Coordinates: 22°36′17.24″N 114°33′05.36″E
- Status: Operational
- Construction began: Unit 1: May 15, 1997; Unit 2: November 28, 1997; Unit 3: December 15, 2005; Unit 4: June 15, 2006
- Commission date: Unit 1: February 26, 2002; Unit 2: September 14, 2002; Unit 3: July 15, 2010; Unit 4: May 3, 2011
- Owners: Daya Bay Nuclear Power Operations and Management Company
- Operator: Lingao Nuclear Power Company Ltd.

Nuclear power station
- Reactors: 4 (2 in Phase I, 2 in Phase II)
- Reactor type: PWR
- Cooling source: South China Sea
- Thermal capacity: 4 x 2905 MW_{t}
- Total electricity generated: 448.55 TWh (1,614.8 PJ) (by the end of 2021)

Power generation
- Units operational: Net: 2 x 950 MW_{e} (Units 1-2); 2 x 1007 MW_{e} (Units 3-4); Gross: 2 x 990 MW_{e} (Units 1-2); 2 x 1080 MW_{e} (Units 3-4)
- Make and model: M310 (Units 1-2); CPR-1000 (Units 3-4)
- Nameplate capacity: 3914 MW_{e}
- Capacity factor: 2021: Unit 1: 89.4%; Unit 2: 97.8%; Unit 3: 82.9%; Unit 4: 83.5%; Lifetime: Unit 1: 88.3%; Unit 2: 88.9%; Unit 3: 86.2%; Unit 4: 86.0%
- Annual net output: 30,263.51 GWh (108,948.6 TJ) (2021)

Ling Ao Nuclear Power Plant (岭澳核电站) is located on the Dapeng Peninsula in Longgang District, Shenzhen, Guangdong, China, about 60 km north of Hong Kong, 1 km north of Daya Bay Nuclear Power Plant. It is operated by China General Nuclear Power Group. The units on site are separated between phase I and phase II.

The plant was one of China's largest energy projects of the latter 1990s.

== Reactors ==
Ling Ao phase I has two nuclear reactors, 950 MWe PWRs Ling Ao I-1 and I-2, based on the French 900 MWe three cooling loop design (M310), which started commercial operation in 2002 and 2003. The planned investment sum for phase I was ca 4 billion USD.

In a Phase II development two CPR-1000 reactors, Ling Ao II-1 and II-2 (alternatively, units 3 and 4), were constructed in conjunction with Areva, based on the French three cooling loop design. Ling Ao II-1, China's first domestic CPR-1000 nuclear power plant, was first connected to the grid on 15 July 2010, having started criticality testing on 11 June 2010. It started commercial operations on 27 September 2010. Ling Ao II-2 was synchronized to the grid on May 3, 2011, with commercial operation beginning on August 7, 2011.

== Reactor data ==
The Ling Ao Nuclear Power Plant consist of 4 operational reactors.

Unit	Type	Model	Net power	Gross power	Thermal power	Construction start	First criticality	Grid connection	Operation start	Notes
Ling Ao 1	PWR	M310	950 MW	990 MW	2905 MW	1997-5-15	2002-02-04	2002-02-26	2002-05-28	
Ling Ao 2	PWR	M310	950 MW	990 MW	2905 MW	1997-11-28	2002-08-27	2002-09-14	2003-01-08	
Ling Ao 3	PWR	CPR-1000	1007 MW	1086 MW	2905 MW	2005-12-15	2010-06-09	2010-07-15	2010-09-15	
Ling Ao 4	PWR	CPR-1000	1007 MW	1086 MW	2905 MW	2006-6-15	2011-02-25	2011-05-03	2011-08-07	

== See also ==
- Nuclear power in China
