= List of power stations in Hong Kong =

Location of power stations in Hong Kong, oil/gas, wind, coal

The following is a list of all of the active power stations in Hong Kong.

Name	Location	Type	Capacity (MW)	Year(s) built	Owner	Picture
Black Point Power Station	Tuen Mun District	Primary: Gas; Backup: Oil (diesel)	3,250	1996–2020	CLP Group (70%); China Southern Power Grid (30%)	
Castle Peak Power Station	Tuen Mun District	Primary: Coal; Backup: Oil (diesel); Gas	4,108	1981–1990	CLP Group (70%); China Southern Power Grid (30%)	
Lamma Power Station	Lamma Island	Coal; Oil; Gas; Solar	3,652	1981–1982	Hong Kong Electric	
Penny's Bay Power Station	Penny's Bay, Lantau Island	Oil (diesel)	300	1992	CLP Group (70%); China Southern Power Grid (30%)	
Lamma Winds	Lamma Island	Wind	0.8	2006	Hong Kong Electric	
WE Station	West New Territories Landfill, Tuen Mun District	Waste-to-energy	10	2020	CLP Group (70%); China Southern Power Grid (30%)	

== Former power stations ==
The following is a list of all of the former power stations in Hong Kong.

Name	Location	Type	Capacity (MW)	Year(s) built	Owner	Status	Picture
Hung Hom Power Station	Chatham Road and Princess Margaret Road	Coal	75 kW	1903	CLP Group	Closed and area re-developed	
Hok Un Power Station A	Hok Yuen, Hung Hom, now Laguna Verde estate	Oil	?	1940	CLP Group	Closed and replaced by Black Point PS and Castle Peak PS	
Hok Un Power Station B	Hok Yuen, Hung Hom, now Laguna Verde estate	Oil	?	1950	CLP Group	Closed 1991 and replaced by Black Point PS and Castle Peak PS	
Tsing Yi Power Station	Tsing Yi Island	Oil; gas	1520 MW	1969	CLP Group	Closed 1990s and replaced by Black Point PS and Castle Peak PS. Demolished and site used for container storage and CLP Tsing Yi Centre.	
Wan Chai Power Station	Wan Chai, now site of Art Deco residential flat (31 Wing Fung Street)	Coal	50 kW	1890	Hong Kong Electric	Closed 1922 and replaced by North Point PS	
North Point Power Station A	North Point, now City Garden residential complex	Coal	3 MW	1919	Hong Kong Electric	Closed 1989	
North Point Power Station B	North Point, now City Garden residential complex	Coal	30 MW	1958	Hong Kong Electric	Closed 1989	
North Point Power Station C	North Point, now City Garden residential complex	Oil	60 MW	1966	Hong Kong Electric	Closed 1989	
Ap Lei Chau Power Station	Ap Lei Chau, now South Horizons housing estate, 34 towers built by Hutchison Whampoa	Oil	750 MW	1968	Hong Kong Electric	Closed 1989; generator moved to Lamma and decommissioned 1984–1989	

== See also ==
- Electricity sector in Hong Kong
