= Electricity sector in Hong Kong =

Electricity sector of Hong Kong
Data
- Continuity of supply: 99.999% (2021)
- Peak Demand (2021): 9.942 GW
- Installed capacity (2021): 13.24 GW
- Production (2021): 133,104 TJ (36.97 TWh)
- Exports (2021): 0 TJ (0 TWh)
- Imports (2021): 45,197 TJ (12.555 TWh)
- Share of renewable energy: 2%
- GHG emissions from electricity generation (2019): 26.3 Mt CO_{2}-e
- Average electricity use (2021): 164,578 TJ (45.716 TWh)
- Distribution losses (2021): 6,039 TJ (1.68 TWh)
- Transmission losses (2021): 7,685 TJ (2.13 TWh)

Consumption by sector (% of total)
- Residential: 28.8 (2021)
- Industrial: 6.8 (2021)
- Commercial: 64.4 (2021)

Institutions
- No. of service providers: CLP Group; Hongkong Electric
- Responsibility for regulation: Electrical and Mechanical Services Department
- Responsibility for the environment: Environmental Protection Department
- Electricity sector law: Electricity Ordinance, Cap. 406 (1990)

Electricity generation by source (2020)
1. Natural gas (44.3%)
2. Coal (28.6%)
3. Imports (26.5%)
4. Other (0.60%)

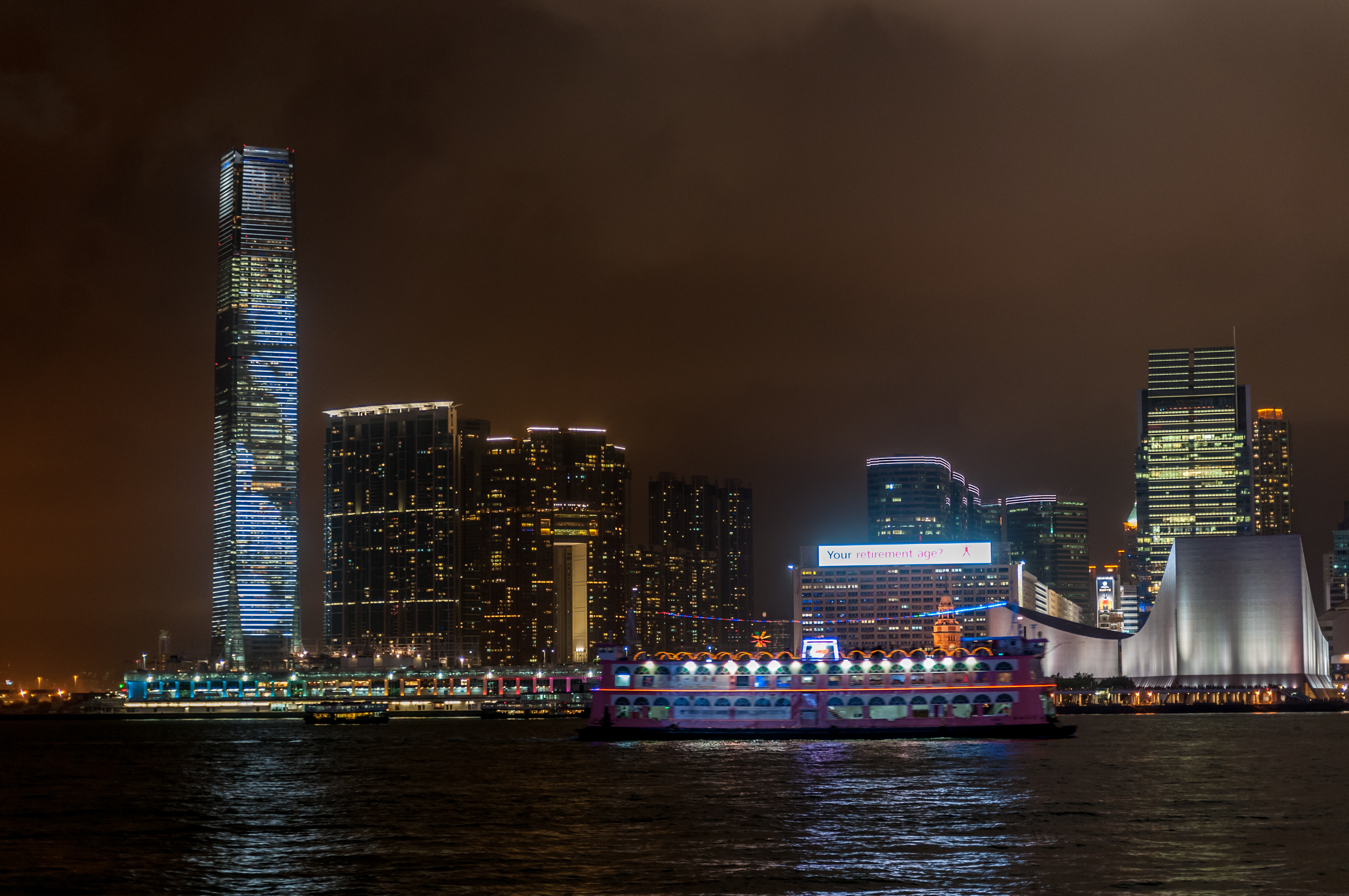
Hong Kong being lit up at night

The Electricity sector in Hong Kong ranges from generation, transmission, distribution and sales of electricity covering Hong Kong. The combustion of coal, natural gas and oil are the main sources of electricity in Hong Kong. The electricity sector contributes 60.4% of Hong Kong's total greenhouse gas emissions.

There are two main providers of electricity in Hong Kong, namely the Hongkong Electric Company and CLP Power Hong Kong Limited.

== Companies ==
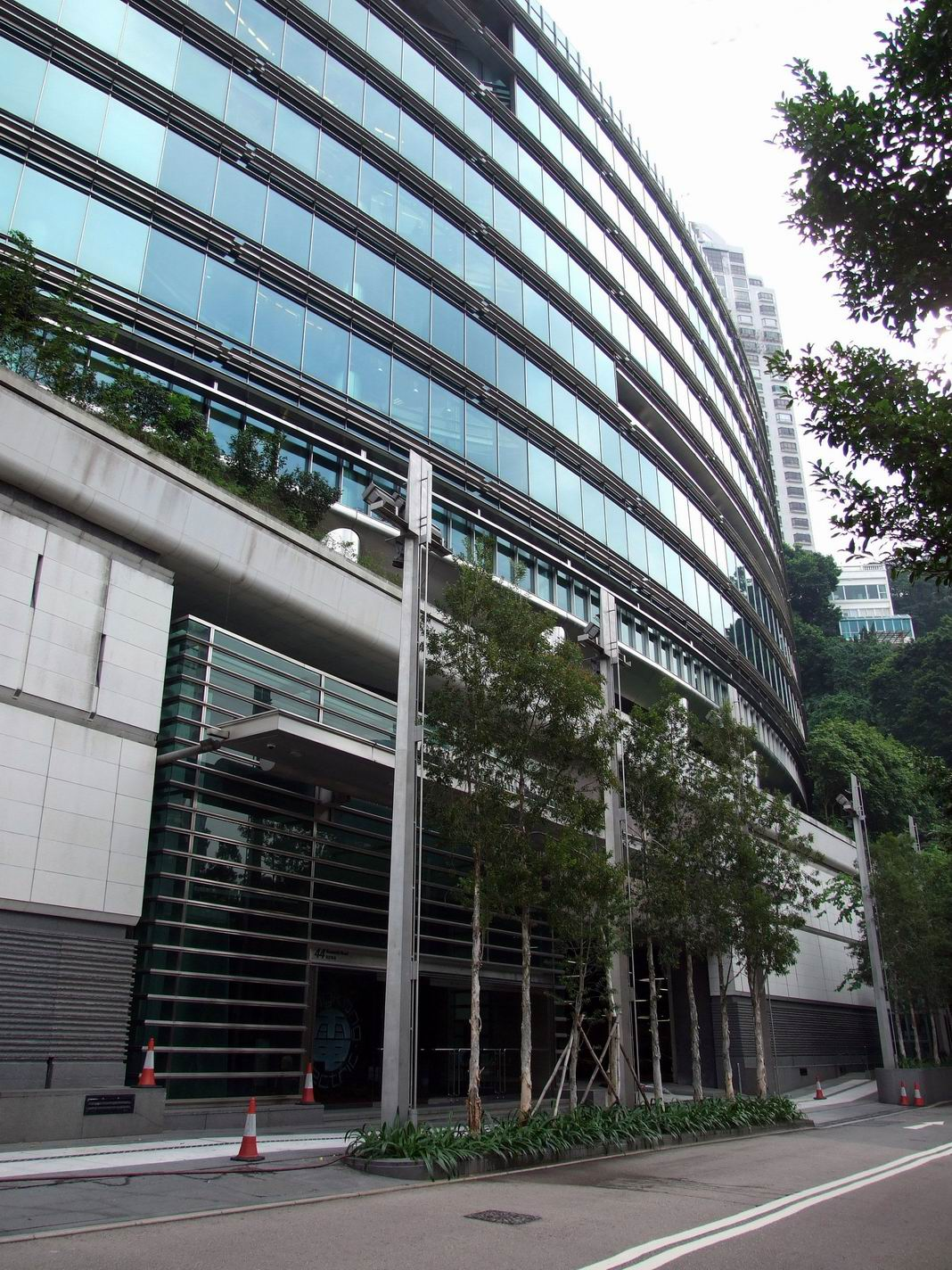
Hongkong Electric Company headquarter

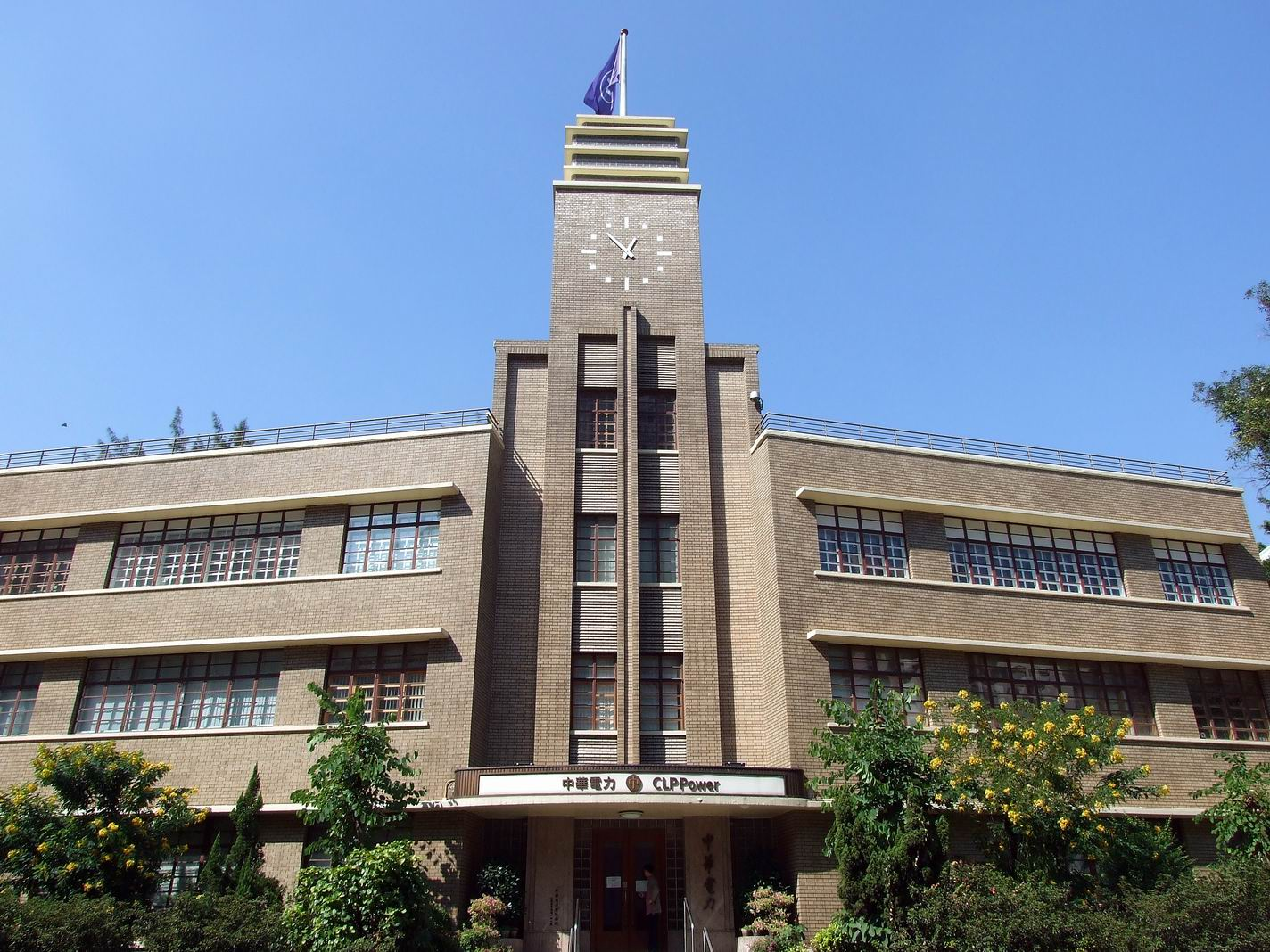
CLP Group ex-headquarter

Power generation in Hong Kong is managed by two major companies under a Scheme of Control arrangement with the Hong Kong Government. These companies effectively operate in a regulated market.

=== Hongkong Electric Company ===
The Hongkong Electric Company (HEC; Chinese: 香港電燈有限公司) supply area includes Hong Kong Island and Lamma Island.

HEC owns and operates:

- Lamma Power Station
- Lamma Winds Power Station

=== CLP Power Hong Kong Limited ===
The CLP Power Hong Kong Limited (CLP; Chinese: 中華電力有限公司), under the CLP Group, was founded on 25 January 1901 as China Light & Power Company Syndicate in British Hong Kong. CLP's supply area includes Kowloon, New Territories and outlying islands except Lamma Island.

CLP owns the following power stations in Hong Kong territory under a joint-venture company Castle Peak Power Company Limited (CAPCO) with China Southern Power Grid International (HK) Co., Limited.

- Black Point Power Station
- Castle Peak Power Station
- Penny's Bay Power Station

CLP also owns 25% shares of the Guangdong Daya Bay Nuclear Power Station and wholly owns Guangzhou Pumped Storage Power Station in Conghua.

== Generation ==
Hong Kong electricity supply by source

=== Fuel ===
In 2012, Hong Kong relied on coal (53%), nuclear (23%), natural gas (22%) and a very small amount (2%) of renewable energy for its electricity generation. As coal-firing generation units start to retire in 2017, the Government plans to raise the share of natural gas to 50% in 2020 while maintaining the share of nuclear power at present levels.

The Government announced that in the year 2020, around half of electricity generation had been met by natural gas, and generation from coal had been successfully reduced to about a quarter, with the remaining generation from imported nuclear energy from the mainland and renewables (utility and off-grid).

=== Power stations in Hong Kong ===
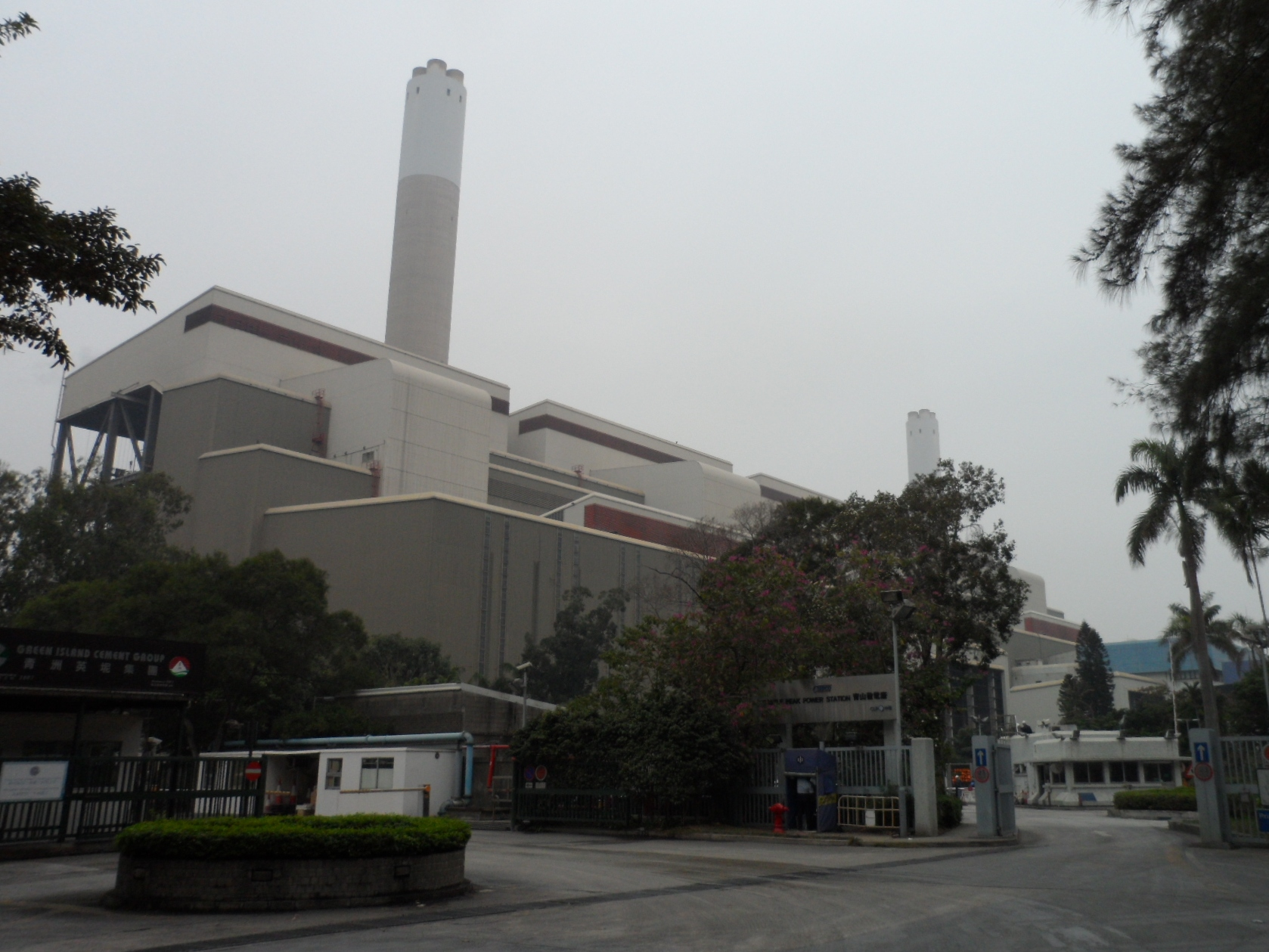
Castle Peak Power Station, Tuen Mun, the largest power station in Hong Kong

Hong Kong has currently 5 power stations, supplying 77% of its electricity needs in 2012.

Black Point Power Station

Commissioned in 1996, the Black Point Power Station is a gas-fired power station located in Lung Kwu Tan, Tuen Mun in the New Territories. It is the largest gas-fired power station in Hong Kong with an installed generation capacity of 2,500 MW.

Castle Peak Power Station

Commissioned in 1982, the Castle Peak Power Station is a coal-fired power station located Tap Shek Kok, Tuen Mun in the New Territories. It is the largest power station in Hong Kong with an installed generation capacity of 4,108 MW.

Lamma Power Station

Commissioned in 1982, the Lamma Power Station is a coal-fired power station located on Po Lo Tsui, Lamma Island, part of the Islands District. It is the second largest power station in Hong Kong at an installed generation capacity of 3,237 MW.

Lamma Winds Power Station

Commissioned in 2006, the Lamma Winds Power Station is a wind turbine located on Lamma Island in Islands District. It is the only industrial-sized wind turbine in Hong Kong with an installed generation capacity of 800 kW.

Penny's Bay Power Station

Commissioned in 1992, the Penny's Bay Power Station is a diesel-fired gas turbine power station located at Penny's Bay on Lantau Island. It is a peaking power station with an installed generation capacity of 300 MW.

=== Interconnection with China ===
Guangdong and Hong Kong

CLP's electrical grid is interconnected with the China Southern Power Grid of Mainland China. Hong Kong imports approximately 23% of its total electricity needs from generating facilities with CLP's equity situated in the mainland. These include a contractual agreement of 70% electricity output from the 2 × 944 MW Daya Bay Nuclear Power Plant and some peaking power/pumping load from Guangzhou Pumped Storage Power Station in Conghua. Recently, CLP said that it would buy 10% more nuclear power from Daya Bay Plant, increasing the share to 80% of the plant's output capacity. But with the increasing electricity demand in southern China, it will be difficult for CLP to acquire 100% of the plant's output capacity.

== Transmission ==
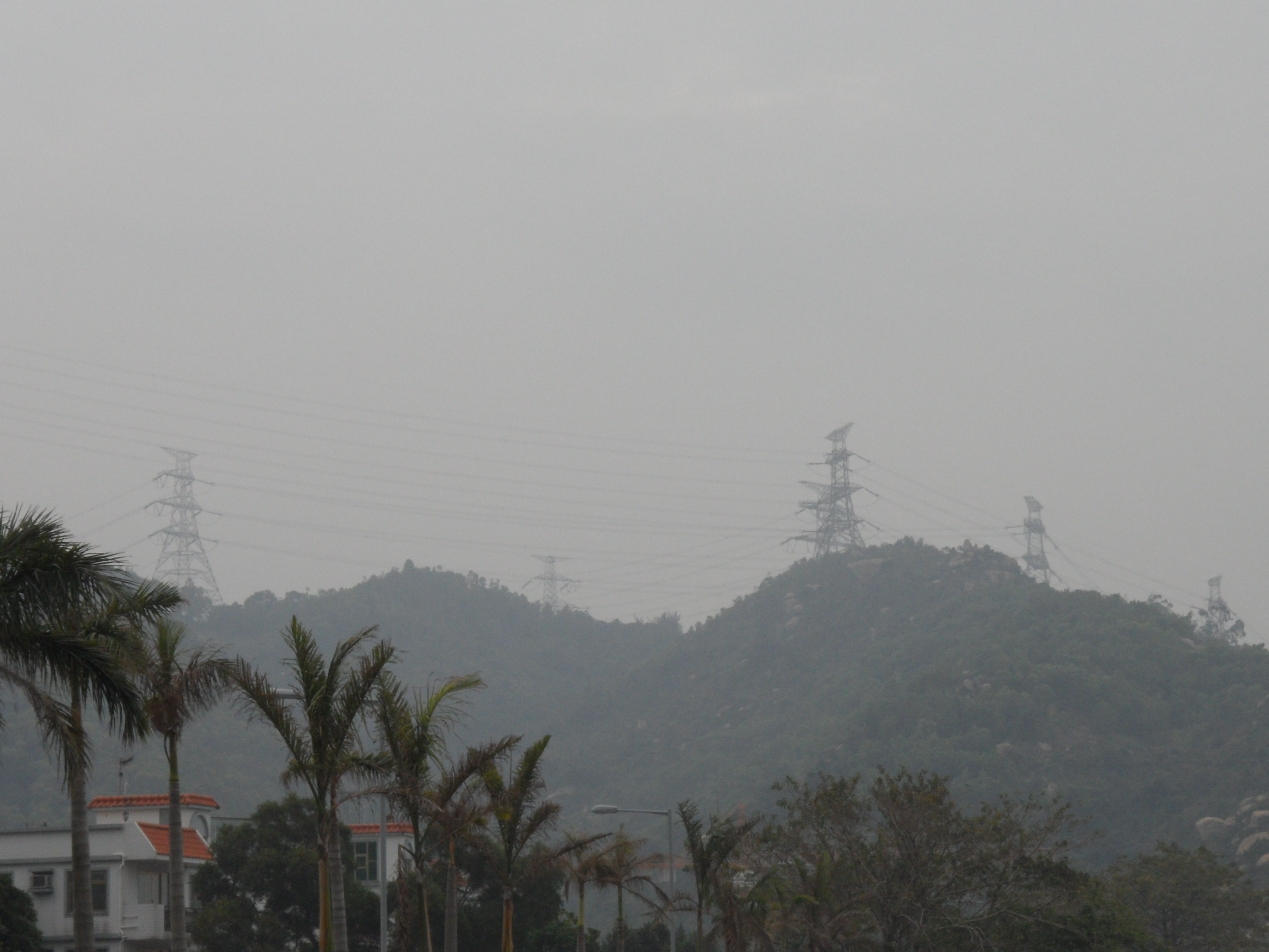
Transmission line in Tai Po suburbs

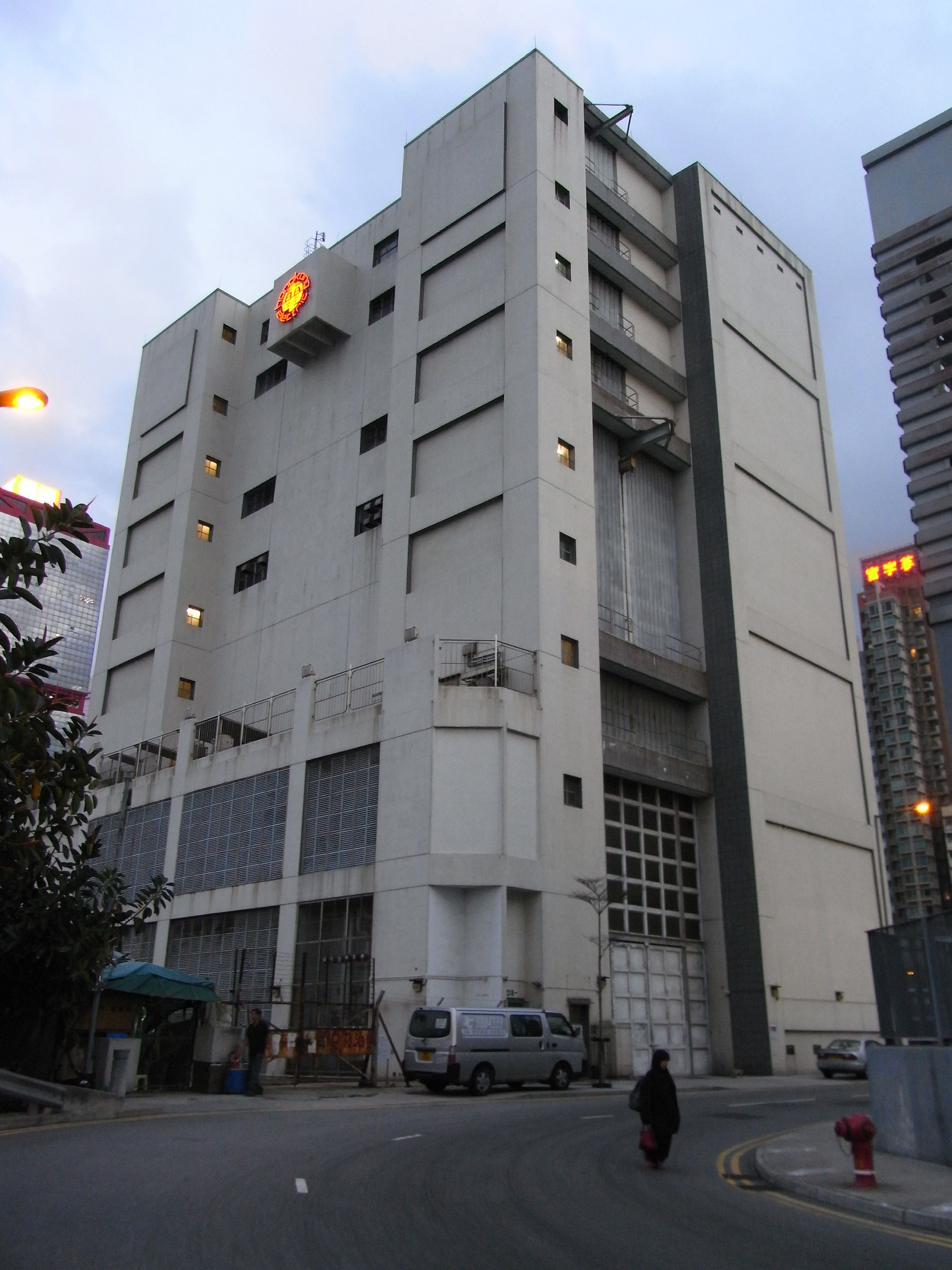
Sheung Wan Zone Substation

HEC transmits electricity on Hong Kong Island at 275 kV and 132 kV voltage level to various load centres, in which the network consists mainly of underground and submarine cable. The network is owned and operated by HEC. There are only few remaining 132 kV overhead power lines in the system. The use of underground cable was chosen because it is ideal for a densely populated area like Hong Kong, and to ensure supply reliability even in bad weather, such as during typhoon.

There are also six dedicated cable tunnels to accommodate some of the 275 kV fluid-filled cable circuits in Hong Kong Island and Lamma Island. In most of the load centres, the voltage is being stepped down to 22 kV or 11 kV for distribution purpose.

CLP transmits electricity in Kowloon and New Territories at 400 kV and 132 kV voltage level. These transmission networks consist mainly of overhead lines. The network is owned and operated by CLP Power. In most of the load centres, the voltage is stepped down to 11 kV for distribution.

Transmission networks of CLP Power and HEC are interconnected by three 132 kV submarine circuits from Hung Hom to North Point for emergency support but no economy power interchange is normally scheduled.

CLP's 400 kV transmission network is also interconnected with the 500 kV China Southern Power Grid in Guangdong Province.

== Distribution ==
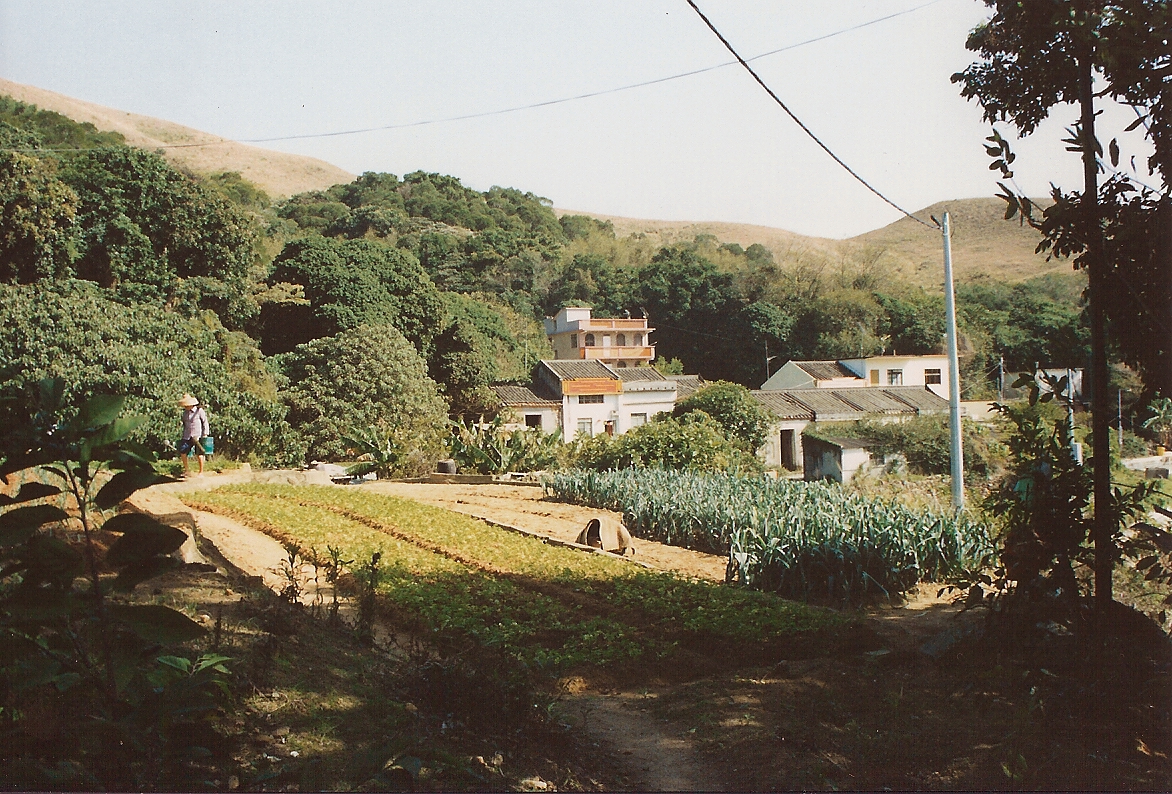
Overhead distribution line in Lamma Island

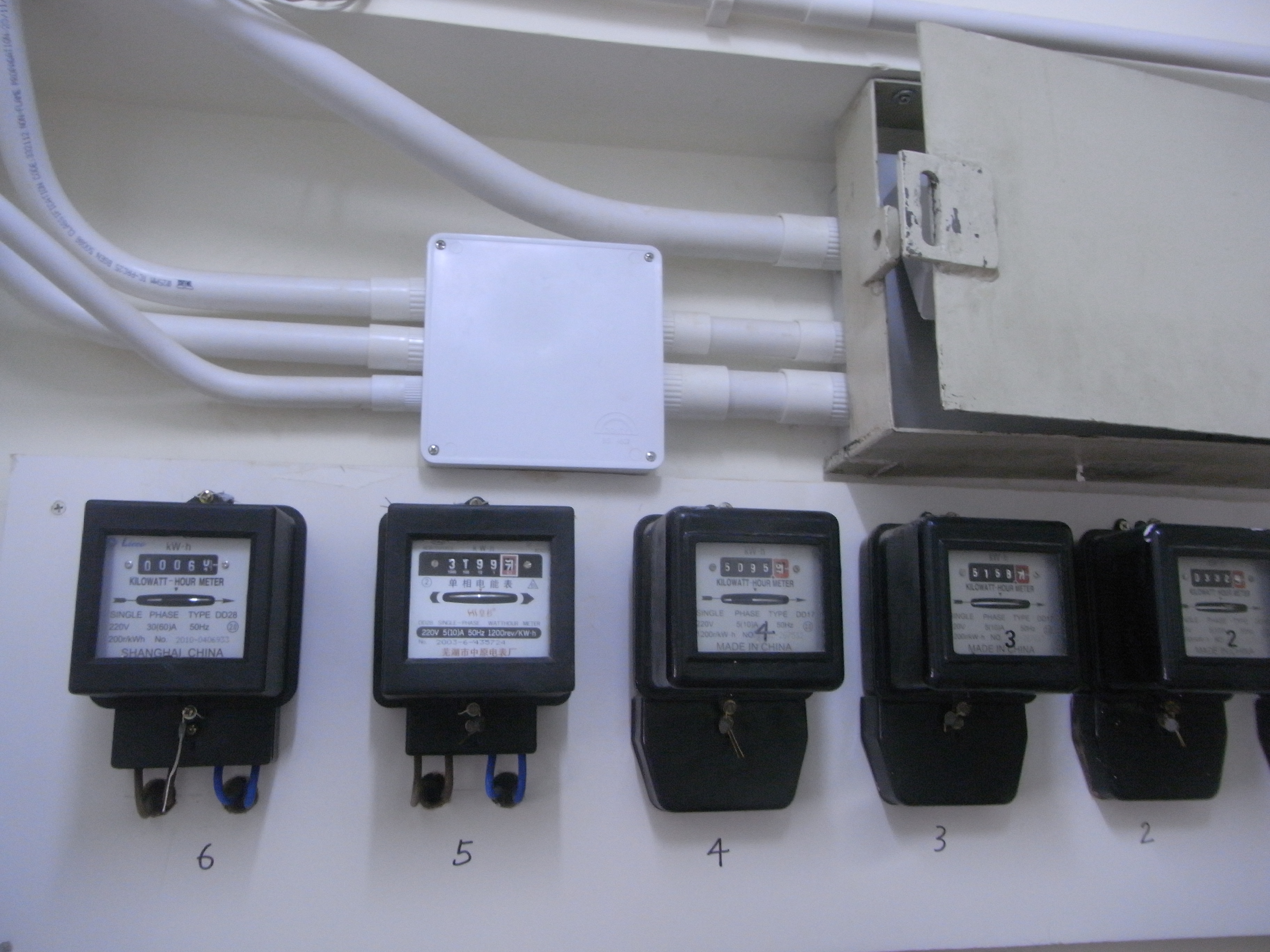
kWh meters in Hong Kong

Electricity is distributed at 22 kV and 11 kV voltage level to over 3,800 distribution substations on HEC side. CLP distributes power mainly at 11 kV level. Voltage is further stepped down to 380 V three-phase or 220 V single-phase and supplied through low-voltage cables to customers.

=== Control centres ===
The system control centre located at Ap Lei Chau monitors and controls all of the switching in HEC's distribution substations remotely. CLP has its system control centre in Tai Po district.

== Consumption ==
In 2021, 178,301 TJ (49.528 TWh) of electricity was consumed, accounting for 51.8% of total energy consumption in Hong Kong. Electricity usage based on industry in Hong Kong are 66% (commercial), 26% (residential), 6% (industrial) and 2% (transportation). Peak demand of electricity use was 9.942 GW.

== See also ==
- Energy in Hong Kong
- List of electricity sectors
- Electricity sector in China
