= Lamma Winds =

Wind turbine on Lamma Island, Hong Kong

Lamma Winds 南丫風采發電站
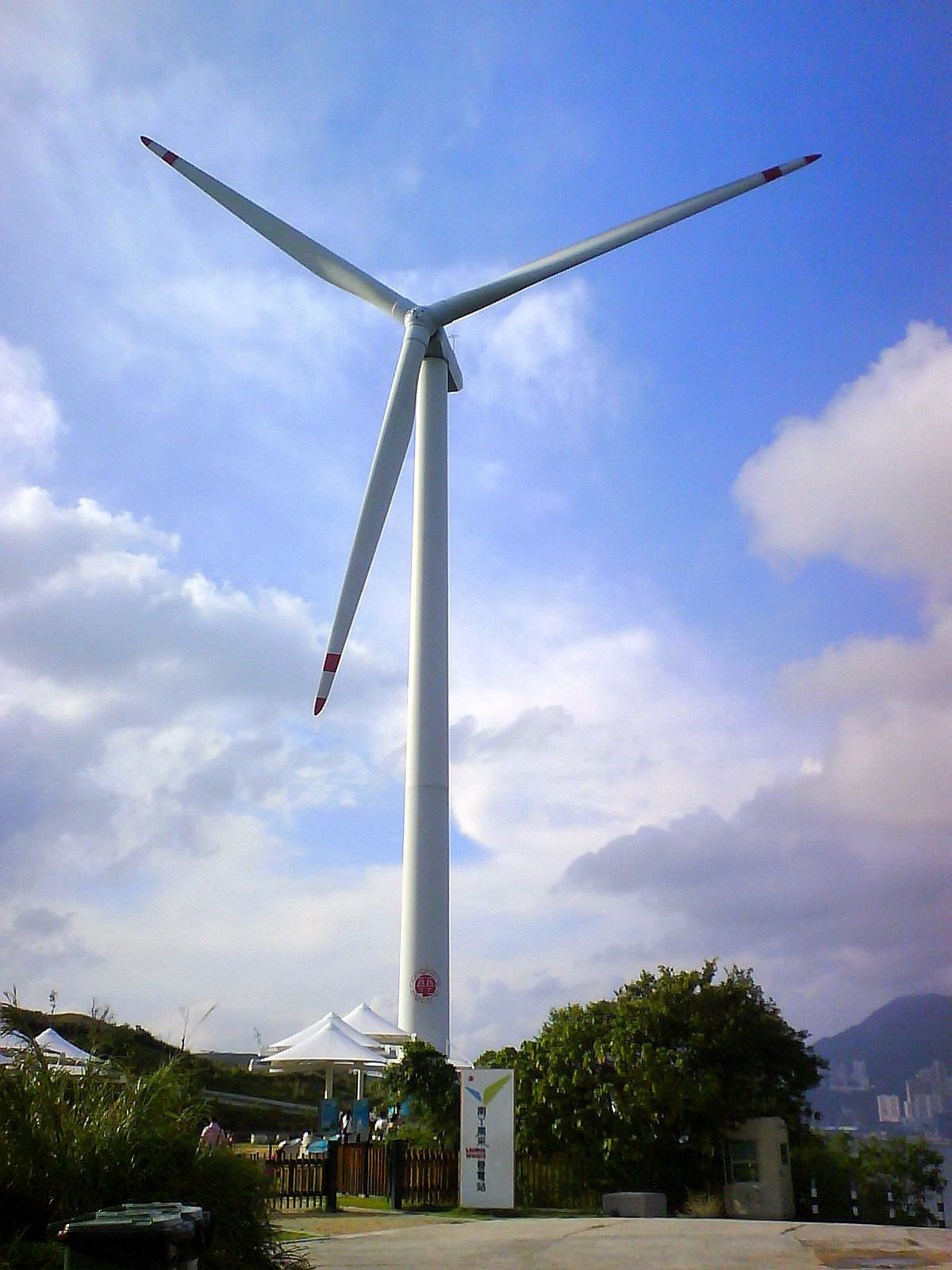
- Lamma Winds in June 2008
- Location of Lamma Winds in Hong Kong
- Official name: Lamma Wind Power Station
- Country: China
- Location: Lamma Island, Hong Kong
- Coordinates: 22°13′30″N 114°7′14″E
- Status: Ceased Operation
- Commission date: 23 February 2006; 20 years ago
- Decommission date: 11 May 2026; 4 months ago
- Owner: Hongkong Electric
- Operator: Hongkong Electric

Wind farm
- Type: Onshore
- Hub height: 46 m (151 ft)
- Rotor diameter: 50 m (160 ft)
- Rated wind speed: 3 to 25 m/s (9.8 to 82.0 ft/s)

Power generation
- Units operational: 1 × 800 kW
- Make and model: Nordex N50/800kW
- Nameplate capacity: 800 kW

External links
- Commons: Related media on Commons

Lamma Winds
- Traditional Chinese: 南丫風采發電站
- Simplified Chinese: 南丫风采发电站
Transcriptions
Yue: Cantonese
- Jyutping: naam4 aa1 fung1 coi2 faat3 din6 zaam6

Lamma Winds (Chinese: 南丫風采發電站) is a wind farm, more accurately a lone wind turbine, in Tai Ling, Lamma Island, Hong Kong where the average wind velocity is 5.5 m/s.

Built near the Lamma Power Station and owned by Hongkong Electric, on average it provided slightly over 100 kW of power to Hong Kong Island and Lamma Island.

Decommissioning of the wind turbine was announced on 25 March 2026.

== Technical details ==
Lamma Winds began operating on 23 February 2006, and was the first commercial-scale wind turbine in Hong Kong. The wind turbine was a Nordex N50/800 kW model with a rotor diameter of 50 metres (160 ft), a nameplate capacity of 800 kilowatts (1,100 hp) and a capacity factor of about 13% which delivered an average output of around 100 kilowatts (130 hp). It could generate enough power for approximately 250 households in ideal conditions, though considerably fewer in typical conditions. Before the construction of the wind turbine, Environmental Resources Management of Hong Kong (ERMHK) analyzed its environmental impacts, and predicted no significant adverse effects.

== Exhibition centre ==
Lamma Winds was one of the relatively few commercial-scale wind turbines in the world that was open to the public. An exhibition centre surrounded the base of the wind turbine, and was open daily from 7 AM to 6 PM, including weekends and holidays. Access to the exhibition center was on foot. The walk from Yung Shue Wan Ferry Pier takes about 40 minutes.

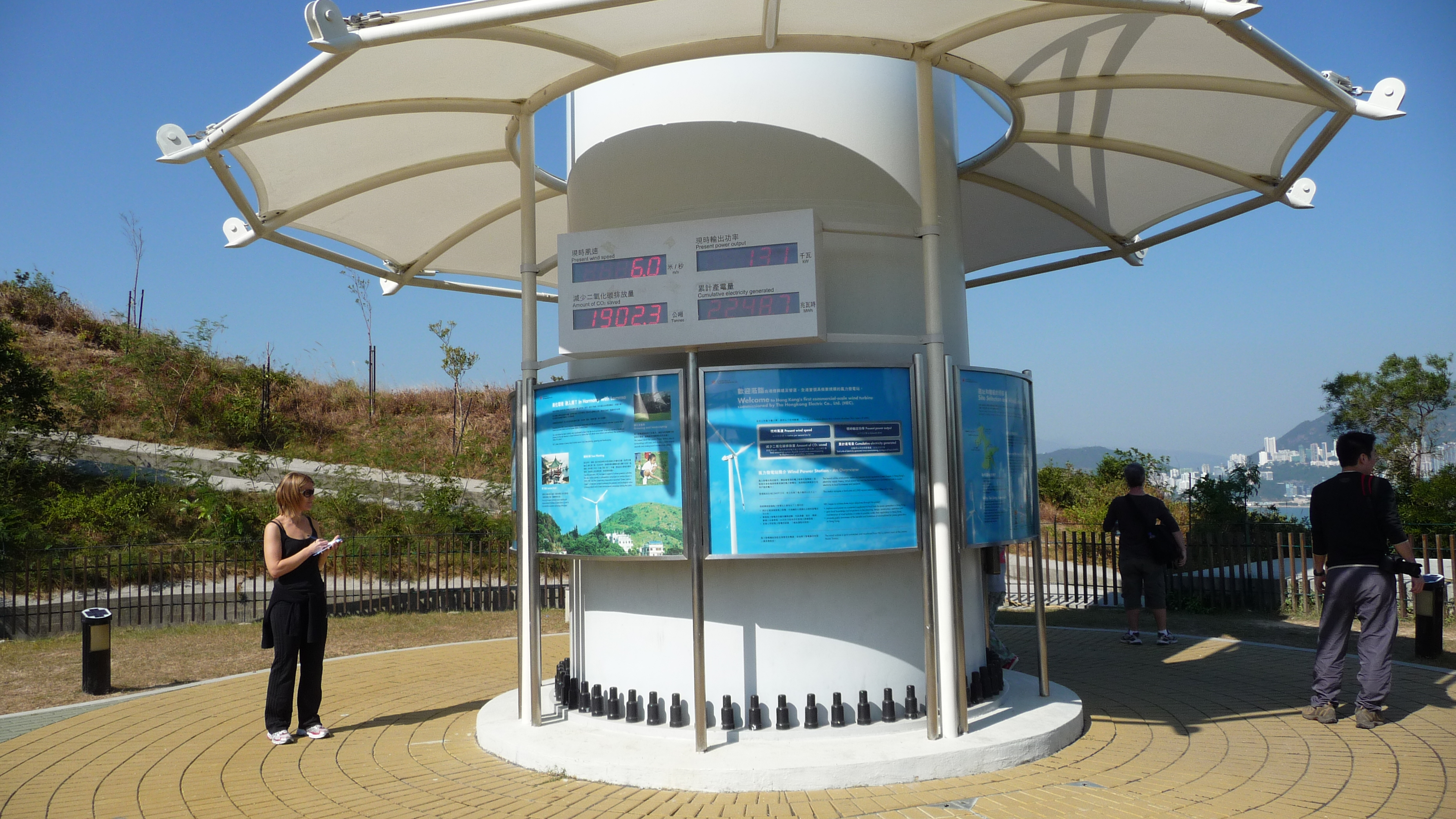
Kiosk at the wind turbine base

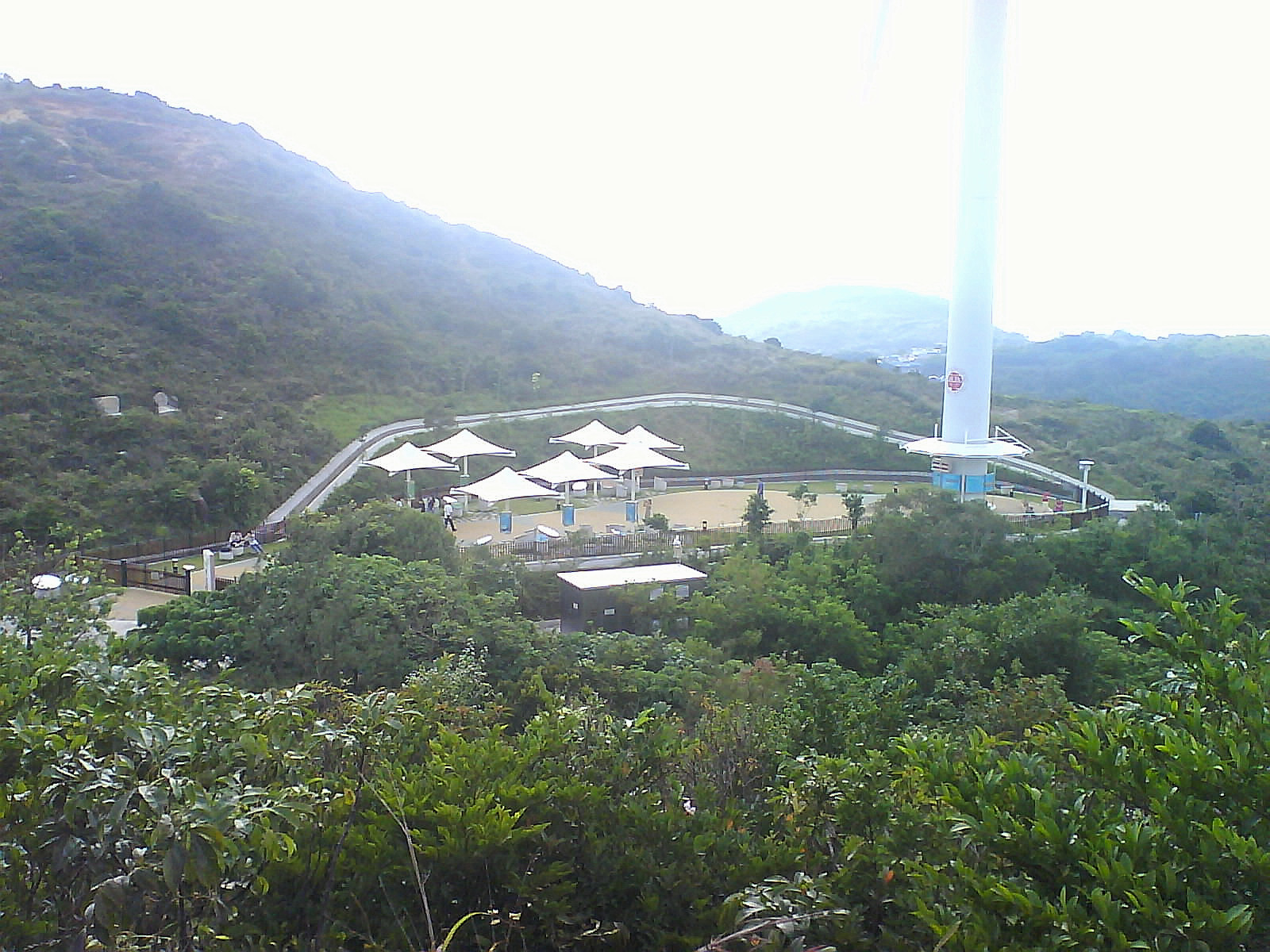

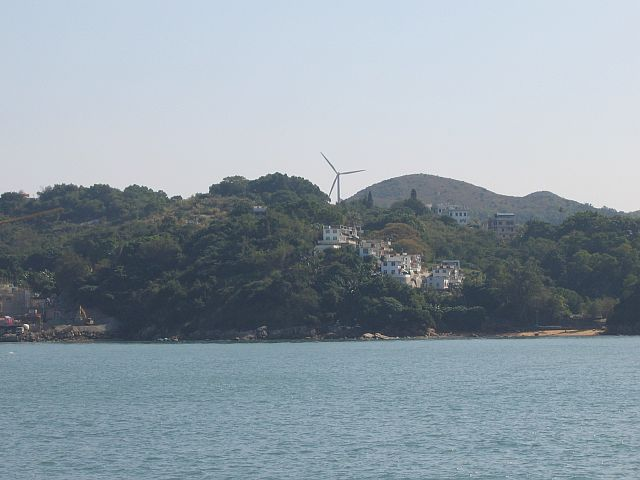

== See also ==
- Electricity sector in Hong Kong
- List of power stations in Hong Kong
