= Castle Peak Power Station =

Power plant in Tap Shek Kok, Hong Kong

Castle Peak Power Station 青山發電廠
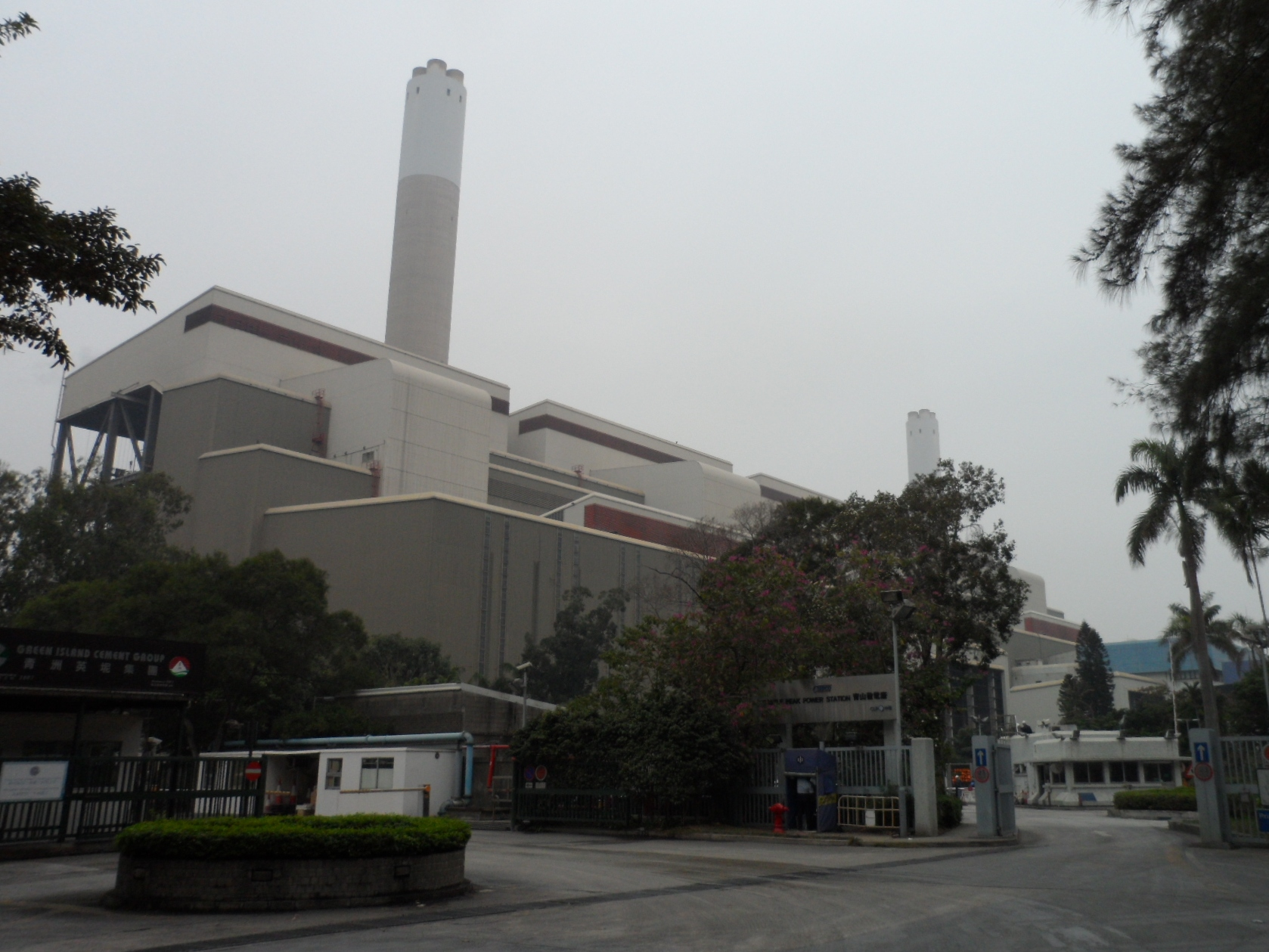
- Country: China
- Location: Tap Shek Kok, Tuen Mun, New Territories, Hong Kong (special administrative region of the People's Republic of China)
- Coordinates: 22°22′32″N 113°55′12″E
- Status: Operational
- Commission date: 1982
Owner
| CLP Group | (70%) |
| China Southern Power Grid | (30%) |

Thermal power station
- Primary fuel: Coal
- Secondary fuel: Natural gas Ultra-low-sulphur diesel

Power generation
- Units operational: 4 × 350 MW (A1-A4) (A1 is reserved for emergency use only); 4 × 677 MW (B1-B4)
- Nameplate capacity: 4,108 MW

External links
- Commons: Related media on Commons

The Castle Peak Power Station (Chinese: 青山發電廠) is the largest coal-fired power station in Hong Kong. It is situated in Tap Shek Kok, Tuen Mun District, on the north shore of Urmston Road. It was named after the nearby Castle Peak. The station consists of four 350 MW and four 677 MW generating units, with auxiliary facilities.

It was commissioned in 1982 with its newest generation unit installed in 1990, currently one of the three power stations that CLP operates in Hong Kong.

In 2007, Castle Peak burned 9 million tonnes of coal of which, according to CLP, 4.6 million tonnes was low-sulphur coal from Indonesia. The power station has been undertaking a range of programmes to improve emission performance, including refurbishing burners to reduce emission of nitrogen oxide, SCR (Selective Catalyst Reduction) and BOFA (Boosted Over Fire Air) has been installed, and flue-gas desulphurisation for sulphur removal. This power station is a major contributor to non-motor-traffic pollution in Hong Kong.

== History ==
The Castle Peak A Power Station was officially opened by Prime Minister Margaret Thatcher on 28 September 1982. The site was designed with provision for construction of a second "B" power station at a later date.

It was decided to go ahead with the Castle Peak B Power Station in 1981. This was built by the Castle Peak Power Company, a joint venture between CLP and Esso. The first two (of four) units were inaugurated by Prince Philip, Duke of Edinburgh on 22 October 1986.

== Ownership ==
The station is owned by Castle Peak Power Company (Capco) which also owns the Black Point Power Station and the Penny's Bay Power Station. Initially CLP held a 40% stake (60% held by ExxonMobil) in Capco. The total power generation capacity of the three power station amounts to 6,908 MW.

On 19 November 2013, CLP Group and China Southern Power Grid Company (CSG) announced its acquisition of Exxon's 60% stake in Capco for HK$24 billion. After the transaction, CLP holds a 70% stake while CSG holds the remaining 30% stake. The transaction was said to help CLP lower its emission to meet its target in 2020 by importing more renewable energy through CSG's grid. The transaction was completed on May 12, 2014.

== Future plans ==
In 2020, CLP installed an additional 550 MW combined cycle gas turbine (CCGT) from Siemens for the nearby gas-powered Black Point Power Station. A second turbine is expected to be completed by 2023. During which, Castle Peak A Power Station Station will be gradually decommissioned, while the B Power Station is expected to cease day-to-day operations by 2035.

As of 2022, Unit A1 (350 MW) was reserved only for emergency use due to reaching the end of its asset life.

== See also ==
- Electricity sector in Hong Kong
- List of power stations in Hong Kong
- List of coal power stations
- List of largest power stations in the world
