= Ultra-low-sulfur diesel =

Type of fuel

Ultra-low-sulfur diesel (ULSD) is diesel fuel with substantially lowered sulfur content. Since 2006, almost all of the petroleum-based diesel fuel available in Europe and North America has been of a ULSD type.

The move to lower sulfur content allows for the application of advanced emissions control technologies that substantially lower the harmful emissions from diesel combustion. Testing by engine manufacturers and regulatory bodies have found the use of emissions control devices in conjunction with ULSD can reduce the exhaust output of ozone precursors and particulate matter to near-zero levels.

In 1993 the European Union began mandating the reduction of diesel sulfur content and implementing modern ULSD specifications in 1999. The United States started phasing in ULSD requirements for highway vehicles in 2006, with implementation for off-highway applications, such as locomotive and marine fuel, beginning in 2007.

== Lubricity ==
Sulfur is not a lubricant in and of itself, but it can combine with the nickel content in many metal alloys to form a low-melting eutectic alloy that can increase lubricity. The process used to reduce the sulfur also reduces the fuel's lubricating properties. Lubricity is a measure of the fuel's ability to lubricate and protect the various parts of the engine's fuel injection system from wear. The processing required to reduce sulfur to 15 ppm also removes naturally occurring lubricity agents in diesel fuel. To manage this change ASTM International (formerly the American Society for Testing and Materials) adopted the lubricity specification defined in ASTM D975 for all diesel fuels and this standard went into effect January 1, 2005. The D975 standard defines two ULSD standards, Grade No. 2-D S15 (regular ULSD) and Grade No. 1-D S15 (a higher volatility fuel with a lower gelling temperature than regular ULSD).

The refining process that removes the sulfur also reduces the aromatic content and density of the fuel, resulting in a minor decrease in the energy content, by about 1%. This decrease in energy content may result in slightly reduced peak power and fuel economy.

ULSD runs in any engine designed for the ASTM D975 diesel fuel, however, it is known to cause some seals to shrink, and may cause fuel pump failures in Volkswagen TDI engines used in 2006 to pre-2009 models. TDI engines from 2009 and on are designed to use ULSD exclusively; biodiesel blends are reported to prevent that failure.

== Africa ==
=== Kenya ===
Some filling stations in Kenya started offering 50 ppm diesel as of December 2010. As of 2018, Kenya has not fully implemented emission control systems.

=== Mauritius ===
As of June 2012, 50 ppm diesel is now standard across all filling stations, in a bid to reduce pollution.

=== Morocco ===
Morocco has started to introduce 50 ppm diesel to filling stations as of 2009.

Since 2011, the 10 ppm diesel has been available in some filling stations. A generalization to all filling stations with the 10 ppm diesel is available since December 2015.

=== South Africa ===
50 ppm sulfur content was first legislated by the South African Department of Minerals and Energy in early 2006, and has been widely available since then.

South Africa's Clean Fuels 2 standard, expected to have begun in 2017, reducing the allowable sulfur content to 1 ppm. As of 2013, Sasol launched 10 ppm diesel at selected filling stations.

== Asia ==
=== Saudi Arabia ===
Euro-II gasoline and diesel standards. In 27th February 2024, the Saudi Ministry of Energy announced the successful introduction of Euro 5 standard diesel fuel and gasoline across the Kingdom of Saudi Arabia.

=== China ===
China has limited sulfur in diesel fuel to 150 ppm (equivalent to the Euro III standard). The limits of 10 ppm (equivalent to the Euro V standard), only apply in certain cities such as Beijing.

From 2014 to 2017, China will limit sulfur in diesel fuel to 50 ppm. After 2017, the sulfur content in diesel fuel will be limited to 10ppm.

=== Hong Kong ===
In July 2000, Hong Kong became the first city in Asia to introduce ULSD, with sulfur content of 50 parts per million (ppm). In addition, new petrol private cars were asked to meet Euro III standards from 2001.

Since the introduction of the law, all fuel station started supplying ULSD since August 2000.

Sulfur content of regular diesel fuel was lowered from 500 ppm to 350 ppm on 1 January 2001.

As part of the ULSD package, Hong Kong government lowered the tax for ULSD from HK$2.89 to $2.00 per liter in June 1998. The temporary concession was extended to 31 March 2000, then to 31 December 2000.

On 19 June 2000, under Report of the Subcommittee on resolution under section 4(2) of the Dutiable Commodities Ordinance (Cap. 109), ULSD fuel tax was lowered to HK$1.11 per liter between 7 July 2000 and 31 December 2000, then increased to $2 in 2001, then $2.89 per liter on 1 January 2002. This resolution was passed on 27 June 2000.

Castle Peak Power Station was designed to burn heavy fuel oil for boiler startup, flame stabilization and occasionally as a secondary fuel. Since the early 2010s, all boilers were converted to burn ULSD to cut down sulfur dioxide emission. On the other hand, Black Point Power Station and Penny's Bay Power Station were designed to burn ULSD as a secondary and primary fuel respectively. So all power stations under CLP Power burn ULSD instead of higher sulfur alternatives now.

=== Pakistan ===
Pakistan began importing Euro-V standard fuel in mid 2020. The import of Euro-V petrol was started on August 10, 2020, while all diesel imports of the country will conform to Euro-V standard by January 2021. The shift was carried out directly from Euro-II to Euro-V.

=== India ===
Delhi first introduced 50 ppm sulfur diesel on 1 April 2010 as a step aimed at curbing vehicular pollution in the capital. This was done in 12 other cities at the same time. The sulfur content in the diesel being used was 350 ppm.

There are two types of diesel available in India from year 2010. Bharat Stage IV (equivalent to Euro IV) specification having Sulfur level below 50 ppm is available all over the country and the Bharat Stage VI with ultra-low-sulfur was slowly introduced in New Delhi in April 2018.

The Bharat Stage VI with ultra-low-sulfur content of less than 10 ppm will be standard across the country from April 2020.

=== Singapore ===
The National Environment Agency (NEA) defines ultra-low-sulfur diesel (ULSD) as diesel fuel with less than 50ppm, or 0.005 per cent, by July 2017 the limit will be 10 ppm.

On 16 June 2005, NEA announced that the use of ULSD would be mandatory beginning 1 December 2005. The regulation also offered tax incentives for Euro IV diesel taxis, buses and commercial vehicles between 1 June 2004 and 3 September 2006, pending a mandatory conversion to Euro IV-compliant vehicles in 2007.

=== Taiwan ===
Beginning on 1 July 2007, Taiwan has limited sulfur in diesel fuel to 10 ppm.

== Europe ==
=== European Union ===
In the European Union, the "Euro IV" standard has applied since 2005, which specifies a maximum of 50 ppm of sulfur in diesel fuel for most highway vehicles; ultra-low-sulfur diesel with a maximum of 10 ppm of sulfur must "be available" from 2005 and was widely available as of 2008. In 2009, the Euro V fuel standard came into effect which reduced maximum sulfur to 10 ppm. In 2009, diesel fuel for most non-highway applications is also expected to conform to the Euro V standard for fuel. Various exceptions exist for certain uses and applications, most of which are being phased out over a period of several years. In particular, the so-called EU accession countries (primarily in Eastern Europe), have been granted certain temporary exemptions to allow for transition.

Certain EU countries may apply higher standards or require faster transition. For example, Germany implemented a tax incentive of per liter of "sulfur free" fuel (both gasoline and diesel) containing less than 10 ppm beginning in January 2003 and average sulfur content was estimated in 2006 to be 3-5 ppm. Similar measures have been enacted in most of the Nordic countries, Benelux, Ireland and the United Kingdom to encourage early adoption of the 50 ppm and 10 ppm fuel standards.

==== Sweden ====
Since 1990, diesel fuel with a sulfur content of 50 ppm has been available on the Swedish market. From the year 1992, production started of a diesel fuel with 2 to 5 ppm of sulfur and a maximum of 5% by volume aromatics. There are certain tax incentives for using this fuel and from about year 2000, this low aromatic, low sulfur fuel has achieved 98-99% penetration of the Swedish diesel fuel market. Now RME (rapeseed methyl ester, also known as FAME (Fatty Acid Methyl Ester)) is a biofuel additive.

Since 2003, a "zero" sulfur with very low aromatic content (less than 1% by volume) diesel fuel has been made available on the Swedish market under the name EcoPar. It is used wherever the working environment is highly polluted, an example being where diesel trucks are used in confined spaces such as in harbors, inside storage houses, during construction of road and rail tunnels & in vehicles that are predominantly run in city centers.

=== Central and Eastern Europe ("accession countries") ===
As of 2008, most accession countries are expected to have made the transition to diesel fuel with 10 ppm sulfur or less. Slightly different times for transition have applied to each of the countries, but most have been required to reduce the maximum sulfur content to less than 50 ppm since 2005. Certain exemptions are expected for certain industries and applications, which will also be phased out over time. Compared to other EU countries, ULSD may be less widely available.

==== Serbia ====
In Serbia, an EU candidate country, all diesel fuel has been of the ultra-low-sulfur (evrodizel) type since August 2013. Before that, there were two types of diesel fuel: D2 with 500 ppm sulfur or more, and low-sulfur evrodizel.

== North America ==
=== Canada ===
Under Sulfur in Diesel Fuel Regulations (SOR/2002-254), the sulfur content of diesel fuel produced or imported was reduced to 15 ppm after 31 May 2006. This was followed by the reduction of sulfur in diesel fuel sold for use in on-road vehicles after 31 August 2006. For the designated Northern Supply Area, the deadline for reducing the sulfur content of diesel fuel for use in on-road vehicles was 31 August 2007.

An amendment titled Regulations Amending the Sulfur in Diesel Fuel Regulations (SOR/2005-305) added following deadlines:

- concentration of sulfur in diesel fuel produced or imported for use in off-road engines shall not exceed 500 ppm from 1 June 2007 until 31 May 2010, and 15 ppm after that date.
- concentration of sulfur in diesel fuel sold for use in off-road engines shall not exceed 500 ppm from 1 October 2007 until 30 September 2010, and 15 ppm after that date.
- concentration of sulfur in diesel fuel sold in the northern supply area for use in off-road engines shall not exceed 500 ppm from 1 December 2008 until 30 November 2011, and 15 ppm after that date.
- concentration of sulfur in diesel fuel produced or imported for use in vessel engines or railway locomotive engines shall not exceed 500 parts per million (ppm) from 1 June 2007 until 31 May 2012, and 15 ppm after that date.

An amendment titled Regulations Amending the Sulfur in Diesel Fuel Regulations (SOR/SOR/2006-163) allowed diesel with sulfur content up to 22 ppm to be sold for onroad vehicles between 1 September 2006 and 15 October 2006, then 15 ppm after that date. This amendment facilitated the introduction of 15 ppm sulfur diesel fuel for on-road use in 2006, by lengthening the period between the dates that the production/import limit and the sales limit come into effect. It provided additional time to fully turn over the higher-sulfur diesel fuel inventory for on-road use in the distribution system. The requirements of the Regulations were aligned, in level and timing, with those of the U.S. EPA.

=== Mexico ===
Mexico began introduction of ULSD throughout the country in 2006.

=== United States ===
Ultra-low-sulfur diesel fuel was proposed by EPA as a new standard for the sulfur content in on-road diesel fuel sold in the United States since October 15, 2006, except for rural Alaska which transferred in 2010. California has required it since September 1, 2006. This new regulation applies to all diesel fuel, diesel fuel additives and distillate fuels blended with diesel for on-road use, such as kerosene. Since December 1, 2010, all highway diesel fuel nationwide has been ULSD. Non-road diesel engine fuel moved to 500 ppm sulfur in 2007, and further to ULSD in 2010. Railroad locomotive and marine diesel fuel moved to 500 ppm sulfur in 2007, and changed to ULSD in 2012. There were exemptions for small refiners of non-road, locomotive and marine diesel fuel that allowed for 500 ppm diesel to remain in the system until 2014. After December 1, 2014 all highway, non-road, locomotive and marine diesel fuel is ULSD.

The EPA mandated the use of ULSD fuel in model year 2007 and newer highway diesel fuel engines equipped with advanced emission control systems that required the new fuel. These advanced emission control technologies were required for marine diesel engines in 2014 and for locomotives in 2015.

The allowable sulfur content for ULSD (15 ppm) is much lower than the previous U.S. on-highway standard for low sulfur diesel (LSD, 500 ppm) which allowed advanced emission control systems to be fitted that would otherwise be damaged and or rendered ineffective by these compounds. These systems can greatly reduce emissions of oxides of nitrogen and particulate matter.

Because this grade of fuel is comparable to European grades, European engines no longer had to be redesigned to cope with higher sulfur content in the U.S. These engines may use advanced emissions control systems which would otherwise be damaged by sulfur. It was hoped that the ULSD standard would increase the availability of diesel-fueled passenger cars in the U.S. In Europe, diesel-engine automobiles have been much more popular with buyers than has been the case in the U.S.

Additionally, the EPA has assisted manufacturers with the transition to tougher emissions regulations by loosening them for model year 2007 to 2010 light-duty diesel engines.

According to EPA estimates, with the implementation of the new fuel standards for diesel, nitrogen oxide emissions will be reduced by 2.6 million tons each year and soot or particulate matter will be reduced by 110,000 tons a year.

On June 1, 2006, U.S. refiners were required to produce 80% of their annual output as ULSD (15 ppm), and petroleum marketers and retailers were required to label diesel fuel, diesel fuel additives and kerosene pumps with EPA-authorized language disclosing fuel type and sulfur content. Other requirements effective June 1, 2006, including EPA-authorized language on Product Transfer Documents and sulfur-content testing standards, are designed to prevent misfueling, contamination by higher-sulfur fuels and liability issues. The EPA deadline for industry compliance to a 15 ppm sulfur content was originally set for July 15, 2006 for distribution terminals, and by September 1, 2006 for retail. But on November 8, 2005, the deadline was extended by 1.5 months to September 1, 2006 for terminals and October 15, 2006 for retail. In California, the extension was not granted and followed the original schedule. As of December, 2006, the ULSD standard has been in effect according to the amended schedule, and compliance at retail locations was reported to be in place.

== South America ==
=== Argentina ===
Argentina has three grades of diesel fuel, as follows:

Grade 1, also known as AGRODIESEL or GASOIL AGRO, is intended mainly for agricultural equipment. Sale of Grade 1 diesel is optional at retail outlets. Grade 2, also known as GASOLINE COMMUNITY (common diesel fuel), is intended for the bulk of diesel fuelled vehicles. Grade 2 diesel fuel is available with 2 different sulfur levels depending on the population density of the location where it is retailed. Grade 3 diesel fuel, also known as GASOLINE ULTRA, is the highest quality diesel fuel and is supposed to be available starting February 1, 2006. Sale of Grade 3 diesel at retail outlets is optional until 2008. At the time the regulation was published, the sulfur limits amounted to 3000 ppm for Grade 1, 1500/2500 ppm (depending on the area) for Grade 2, and 500 ppm for Grade 3. Sulfur limit reductions occur in 2008, 2009, 2011, and 2016. After the last reduction, in June 2016, the sulfur limits become 1000 ppm, 30 ppm, and 10 ppm for the three respective grades.

Law 26.093 requires 5% biodiesel to be blended with diesel fuel starting January 1, 2010.

=== Brazil ===
Since January 2012, Brazilian service stations started offering two types of Diesel, 50 ppm and 500 ppm on most areas and 1800 ppm in remote areas. Since January 2013, the 10 ppm or EURO V Diesel replaced the 50 ppm Diesel, which is now widely used and can be found in the majority of service stations, and the 1800 ppm was discontinued. All vehicles produced or sold in Brazil since January 2012 must be able to use only 50 ppm or lower sulfur Diesel. Also, all Diesel available for purchase in Brazil contains 10% of biodiesel.

=== Chile ===
Chile requires <15 ppm in Santiago, for diesel since 2011, and the rest of the country requires <50 ppm.

=== Colombia ===
Since January 1, 2013, Colombia's diesel has <50 ppm for public and private transport.

=== Uruguay ===
Uruguay is expected to impose a 50 ppm ULSD limit by 2009. 70% of the fuel used in Uruguay is diesel.

== Oceania ==
=== Australia ===
Australia has had a limit of 10 ppm since 1 January 2009. The limit had been 50ppm.

=== New Zealand ===
New Zealand has had a limit of 10 ppm since 1 January 2009. Prior to that, the limit was 50 ppm.

== Russia and the former Soviet Union ==
As of 2002, much of the former Soviet Union still applied limits on sulfur in diesel fuel substantially higher than in Western Europe. Maximum levels of 2,000 and 5,000 ppm were applied for different uses. In Russia, lower maximum levels of 350 ppm and 500 ppm sulfur in automotive fuel were enforced in certain areas, and Euro IV and Euro V fuel with a concentration of 50 ppm or less was available at certain fueling stations, at least in part to comply with emissions control equipment on foreign-manufactured cars and trucks, the number of which is increased every year, especially in big cities such as Moscow and Saint Petersburg. According to the technical regulation, selling a fuel with sulfur content over 50 ppm was allowed until 31 December 2011. Euro IV diesel in particular may be available at fueling stations selling to long-distance truck fleets servicing import and export flows between Russia and the EU. As of August 2026, lower grade fuel, equivalent to EuroII standard was being supplied as an "anti-crisis" measure in response to supply difficulties caused by war damage to Russian petrochemical infrastructure.

== See also ==
- Biodiesel
- Diesel engine
- Diesel fuel
- EN 590
- European emission standards
- Organosulfur compounds
- United States emission standards
- Volkswagen emissions scandal
