= Paguthan Combined Cycle Power Plant =

Coordinates: 21.7808768°N 73.0015326°E

- Country: India
- Location: Bharuch district, Gujarat, India
- Status: Mothballed
- Construction began: 1996
- Commission date: 1998
- Owner: Apraava Energy Private Limited
- Operator: CLP India Private Limited

Thermal power station
- Primary fuel: Natural gas
- Secondary fuel: Naphtha
- Combined cycle?: Yes

Power generation
- Units operational: 3 × Gas turbines (138 MW each); 1 × Steam turbine (241 MW)
- Nameplate capacity: 655 MW
- Capacity factor: 655 MW

Paguthan Combined Cycle Power Plant is located in Bharuch district of Gujarat. The gas based power project is owned by CLP India Private Limited, a subsidiary of CLP Group of Hong Kong.

The plant was originally owned by Gujarat Paguthan Energy Corporation which was acquired by CLP India Private Limited in 2002.

== Capacity ==
It has an installed capacity of 655 MW. The plant became fully operational in 1998. It comprises following units.

- Three units of gas turbine, each of 138 MW capacity.
- One unit of steam turbine of 241 MW capacity.
