= Power Assets Holdings =

Electric utility company

Power Assets Holdings Limited
- Native name: 電能實業有限公司
- Company type: Public
- Traded as: SEHK: 6; Hang Seng Index component
- Industry: Public Utility
- Headquarters: Hong Kong
- Key people: Charles Tsai (CEO)
- Products: Electric service
- Owner: Cheung Kong Infrastructure Holdings (38.87%)
- Website: www.powerassets.com

Power Assets Holdings Limited (Chinese: 電能實業有限公司), formerly Hongkong Electric Holdings Limited (Chinese: 香港電燈集團有限公司), is a vertically integrated electric utility company. It is the majority shareholder in the Hongkong Electric Company, having reduced its holding in the company through a series of share sales, the most recent being in June 2015.

The company owns significant holdings in a number of energy providers and networks around the world, in partnership with its parent company Cheung Kong Infrastructure Holdings, which holds a 38.87% stake in the business.

== Holdings ==
Power Assets Holdings has shareholdings in the following businesses:

- The Hongkong Electric Company (33.37%) - one of the two suppliers of electricity in the Hong Kong electricity market.
- Associated Technical Services Limited
- SA Power Networks, Australia - acquired in 2000
- Powercor Australia, - acquired in 2000
- CitiPower, Australia - acquired in 2002 and jointly owned by HEC's parent Cheung Kong International
- Ratchaburi Power Company Limited, Thailand - 25% stake with Ratchaburi Power Company
- Northern Gas Networks, UK - 41.29% (19.9% stake acquired in 2005)
- Wellington Electricity Distribution Network - 50% acquired in 2007
- UK Power Networks - 40%
- Wales & West Utilities - 30%
- Canadian Power Holdings Inc. - 50%
- Husky Midstream Limited Partnership - 48.75%
- Dutch Enviro Energy - 27%
- Energy Developments Limited - 20%
- Jinwan Power Plant - 45%
- Dali and Laoting Wind Farms - 45%
