= Lamma Power Station =

Power plant on Lamma Island in Hong Kong

Lamma Power Station 南丫發電廠
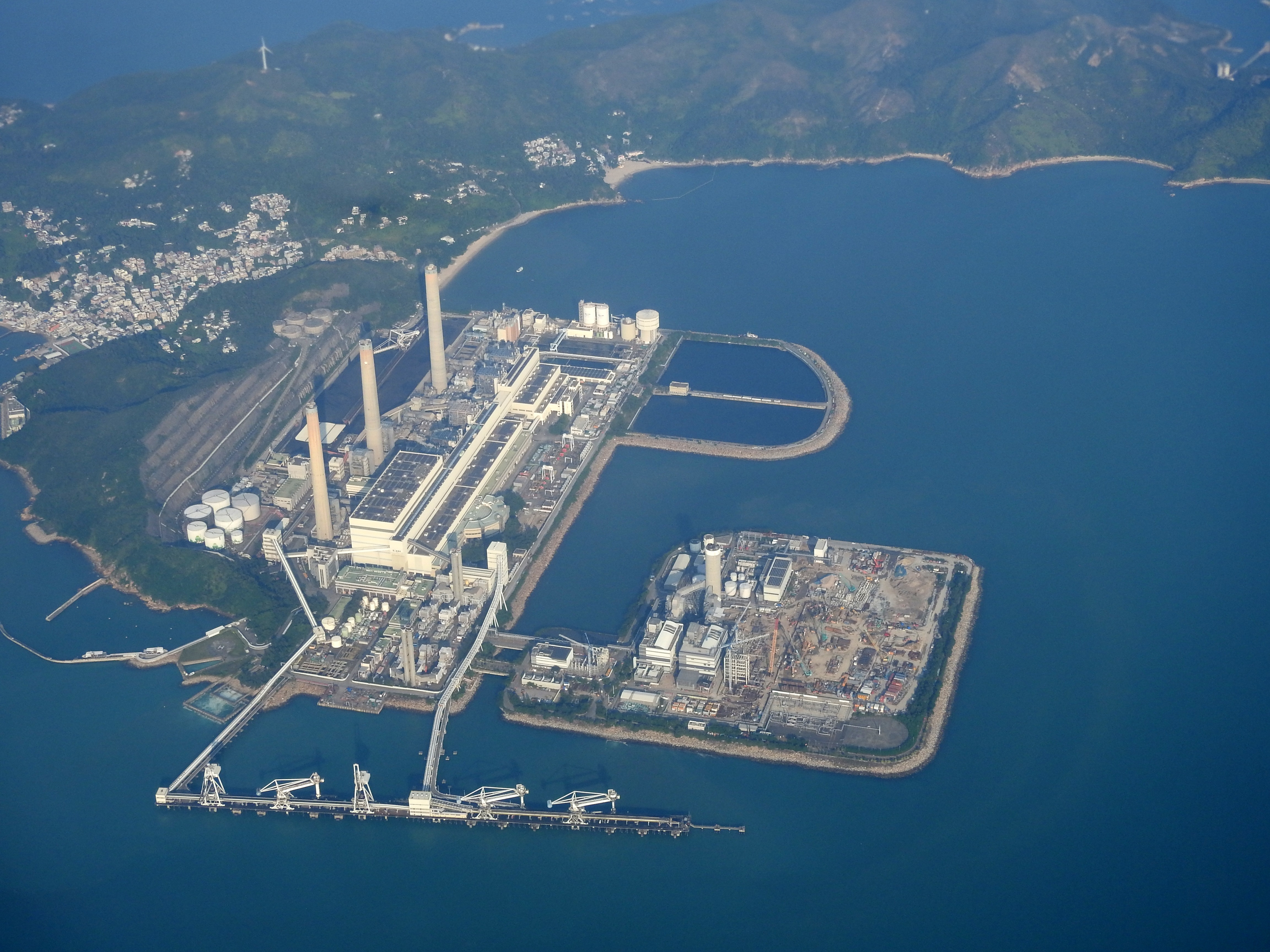
- Location of Lamma Power Station in Hong Kong
- Official name: Lamma Island Power Station; 南丫島發電廠
- Country: China
- Location: Lamma Island, Hong Kong
- Coordinates: 22°13′6.51″N 114°6′28.63″E
- Status: Operational
- Commission date: 1982 (Thermal power station); 2010 (Solar farm)
- Owner: Hongkong Electric
- Operator: Hongkong Electric Company

Solar farm
- Type: Flat-panel PV

Thermal power station
- Primary fuel: Coal; Natural gas; Oil

Power generation
- Units operational: Coal; 1 × 250 MW; 5 × 350 MW; Natural gas; 1 × 55 MW; 4 × 125 MW; 1 × 345 MW (combined cycle); 1 × 335 MW (combined cycle); Solar; 1.1 MW (Solar photovoltaic)
- Nameplate capacity: 3,652 MW (2022)

External links
- Website: www.hkelectric.com/en/our-operations/electricity-generation
- Commons: Related media on Commons

Lamma Power Station
- Traditional Chinese: 南丫發電廠
Transcriptions
Yue: Cantonese
- Yale Romanization: Nàahm aā faat dihn chóng
- Jyutping: Naam^{4} aa^{1} faat^{3} din^{6} cong^{2}

Lamma Power Station, informally known as Lamma Island Power Station, is a thermal power station and solar farm in Po Lo Tsui, Lamma Island, Hong Kong. With an installed capacity of 3,617 MW, the power station is the second largest coal-fired power station in Hong Kong after Castle Peak Power Station.

Completed in 1982 for Hongkong Electric, the station provides power to Hong Kong Island and Lamma Island. It was later expanded several times. As of 2021, the total installed capacity of the power station was 3,617 MW, made up of 2,000 MW coal-fired units, 555 MW oil-fired gas turbine units, 1,060 MW gas-fired combined cycle units, and one 1.1 MW solar power system.

== Solar ==
In 2010, HK Electric began installing a solar farm in Lamma Power Station with a capacity of 550 kW, with a cost of HK$23 million. The panels chosen uses 5,500 amorphous silicon photovoltaic modules, which HK Electric says performs better in the higher temperatures and tropical climate of Hong Kong.

HK Electric expanded the solar farm to a capacity of 1 MW in 2013. The newly installed panels could generate 40% more electricity than the ones used in the original installation. The total solar farm used 8,662 PV modules covering a total area of 13,000 m^{2}.

In 2021, it was announced the system had been upgraded to 1.1 MW due to replacement of older panels. The solar power system is expected to be increased to 1.2 MW by 2023.

== See also ==
- Electricity sector in Hong Kong
- List of power stations in Hong Kong
