= Penny's Bay Power Station =

Power plant in Penny's Bay, Hong Kong

Penny's Bay Power Station 竹篙灣燃氣輪機發電廠
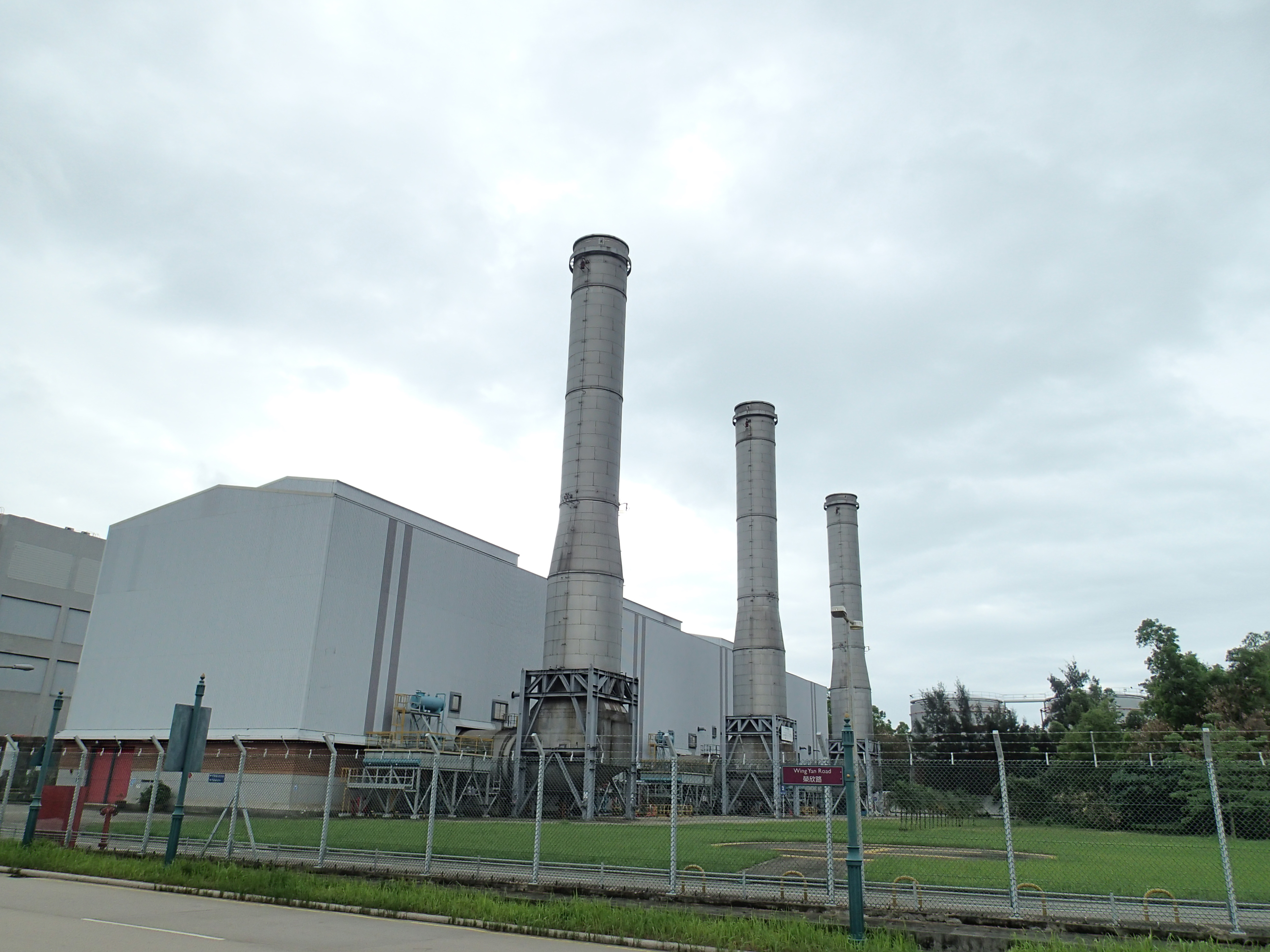
- The power station viewed from Wing Yan Road
- Country: China
- Location: Lantau Island, New Territories, Hong Kong
- Coordinates: 22°19′14.2″N 114°2′30.1″E
- Status: Operational
- Commission date: 25 March 1992; 33 years ago
- Owner: CLP Group
- Operator: Castle Peak Power Company Limited (CAPCO)

Thermal power station
- Primary fuel: Ultra-low-sulfur diesel
- Combined cycle?: No

Power generation
- Units operational: 3 × 100 MW
- Nameplate capacity: 300 MW

External links
- Commons: Related media on Commons

Penny's Bay Power Station (Chinese: 竹篙灣燃氣輪機發電廠) is a gas turbine power station in Penny's Bay, Hong Kong. The HKD 1.1 billion power station was commissioned on 25 March 1992. The complex consists of three open cycle gas turbines in a rectangular turbine hall with three smokestacks. The turbines were supplied by John Brown Engineering and generators by GEC-Alsthom. It is operated by CLP Power as a standby and peaking power station. The power plant can start up in 12 minutes. Its primary fuel is ultra low sulphur diesel (ULSD).

It is located at Penny's Bay on Lantau Island and its nameplate capacity is 300MW. The plant serves as a backup facility providing quick start support to CLP Power's generating system. The plant attained a thermal efficiency between 10.1% to 23.3% from 2012 to 2016.

Power from the station is delivered by CLP's 132kV transmission network and through submarine cables to customers outside Lantau Island.

== Transportation ==
The power station is accessible within walking distance south east from Sunny Bay station of the MTR.

== See also ==
- Electricity sector in Hong Kong
- List of power stations in Hong Kong
