= CLP Group =

Hong Kong electric power company

CLP Group CLP Power Hong Kong Ltd. 中電集團 中華電力有限公司

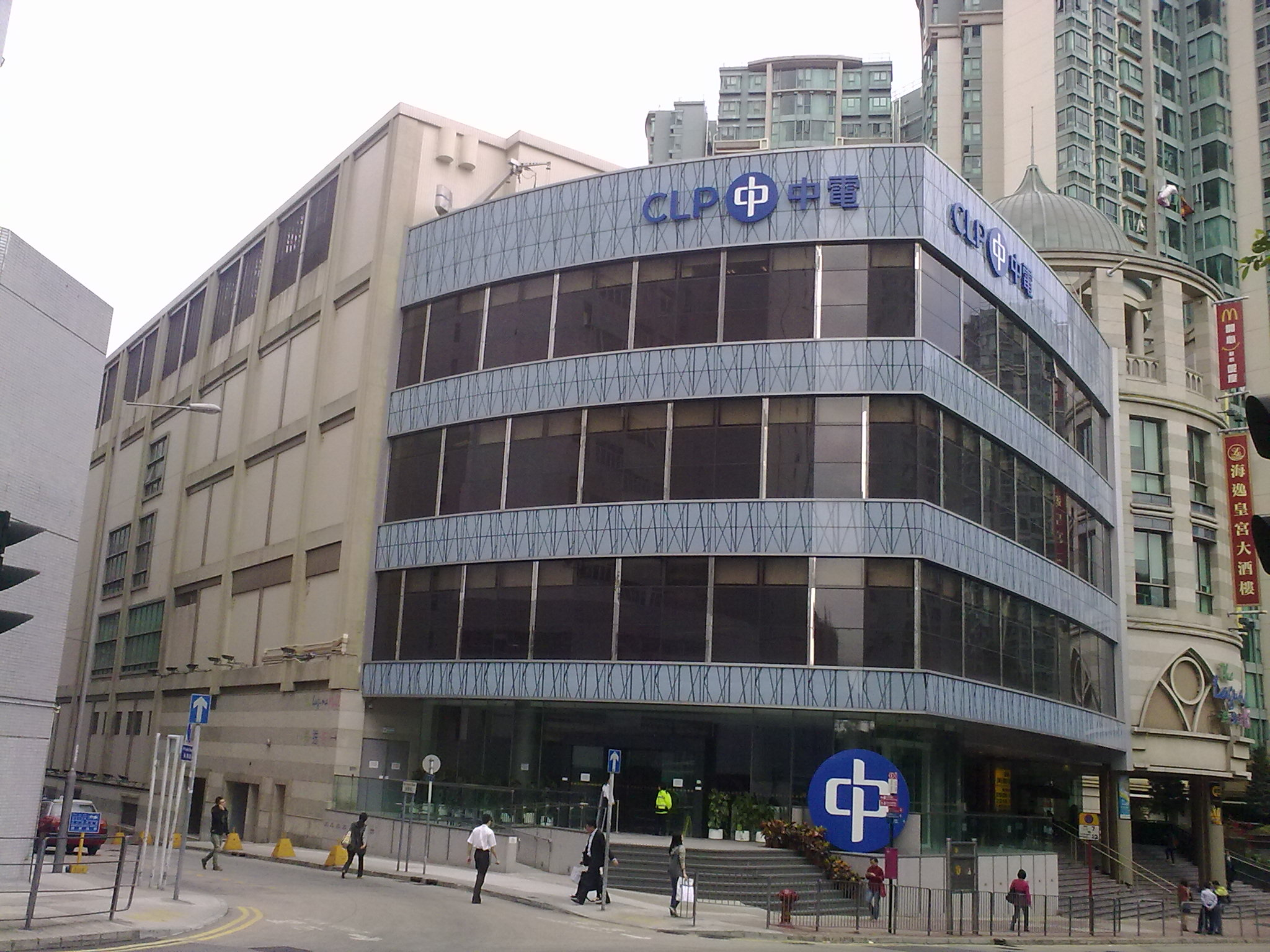
- Former headquarters in Hung Hom, Hong Kong
- Traded as: SEHK: 2; Hang Seng Index component; S&P Asia 50 component
- ISIN: HK0002007356
- Industry: Public utility – Energy
- Founded: 25 January 1901; 125 years ago in Crown Colony of Hong Kong
- Headquarters: 43 Shing Kai Road, Kai Tak, Kowloon, Hong Kong
- Area served: Hong Kong; Australia; India; Mainland China; Taiwan; Southeast Asia
- Key people: Michael David Kadoorie (Chairman); Andrew Clifford Winawer Brandler (Vice Chairman); Chiang Tung Keung (Executive Director & CEO)
- Products: Electric service
- Owner: Kadoorie family (35%)
- Number of employees: 8,074 (2021)
Subsidiaries
CLP Power Hong Kong	(100%)
Castle Peak Power Company (CAPCO)	(70%)
CLP𝑒 Solutions	(100%)
EnergyAustralia	(100%)
Hong Kong Pumped Storage Development Company (PSDC)	(100%)
Hong Kong Nuclear Investment Company	(100%)
- Website: CLP Hong Kong; CLP Group

CLP Group
- Traditional Chinese: 中電集團
- Simplified Chinese: 中电集团
- Cantonese Yale: jung1 din6 jaap6 tyun4
Transcriptions
Yue: Cantonese
- Yale Romanization: jung1 din6 jaap6 tyun4
- Jyutping: zung1 din6 zaap6 tyun4
- IPA: [tsɔ́ːŋ tìːn tsàːp̚ tʰy̏ːn]

CLP Power Hong Kong Ltd. (formerly China Light and Power Co., Ltd.)
- Traditional Chinese: 中華電力有限公司
- Simplified Chinese: 中华电力有限公司
- Cantonese Yale: jung1 wa4 din6 lik6 yau5 haan6 gong1 si1
Transcriptions
Yue: Cantonese
- Yale Romanization: jung1 wa4 din6 lik6 yau5 haan6 gong1 si1
- Jyutping: zung1 waa4 din6 lik6 jau5 haan6 gong1 si1
- IPA: [tsɔ́ːŋ wȁː tìːn lèk̚ jɐ̬u hàːn kɔ́ːŋ síː]

CLP Group (Chinese: 中電集團) and its holding company, CLP Holdings Ltd (中電控股有限公司), also known as China Light and Power Company, Limited (now CLP Power Hong Kong Ltd., 中華電力有限公司), is an electricity company in Hong Kong. Incorporated in 1901 as China Light & Power Company Syndicate, its core business remains the generation, transmission, and retailing of electricity. It also has businesses in a number of Asian markets as well as EnergyAustralia in Australia. It is one of the two main electricity power generation companies in Hong Kong, the other being Hongkong Electric Company.

== History ==
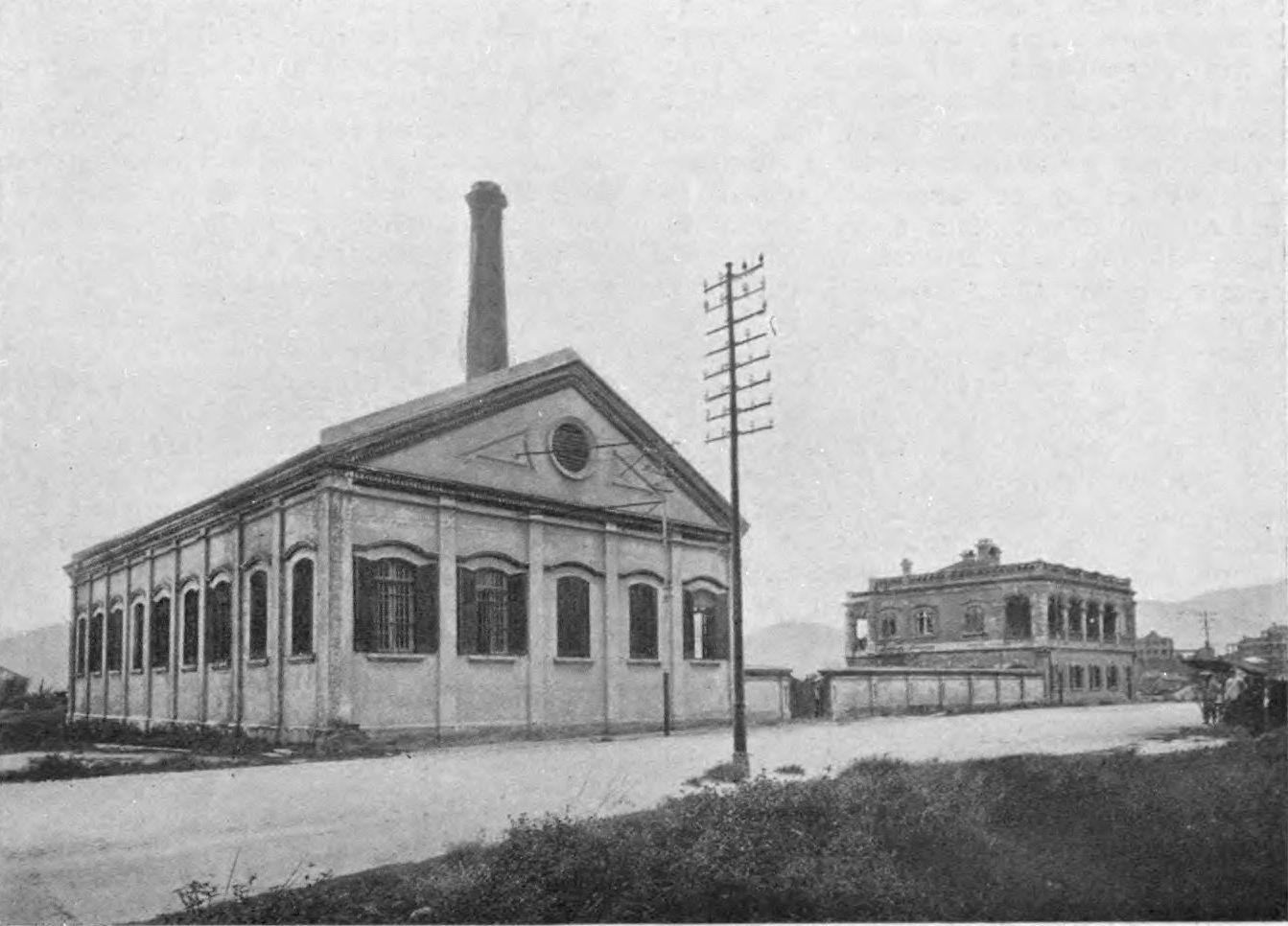
The group's first power station on Chatham Road, Hung Hom, in Hong Kong (picture taken between 1903 and 1908).

The company was founded in Hong Kong in 1901 as China Light & Power Company Syndicate by Shewan, Tomes & Co. and others. In 1903, the company's first power station, with a generating capacity of 75 kW, was commissioned in Hung Hom at the junction of present-day Chatham Road and Princess Margaret Road. By 1919, the company was supplying electricity for street lights in Kowloon.

The Kadoorie family joined the CLP board of directors in 1930 and retains control of the company as of 2013.

In 1983, the company established a joint venture with Guangdong Nuclear Power for the construction and operation of the Daya Bay Nuclear Power Plant.

On 6 January 1998, CLP Holdings Limited replaced China Light & Power Company Limited as the new holding company listed on the Stock Exchange of Hong Kong.

In 2018, CLP established a new branch, CLP Innovation (previously named) and now CLP Digital. The branch has a separate company listing, Smart Energy Connect (SEC) that provides environmentally friendly solutions.

== Index constituent ==
As of 2013, CLP Group is a component of The Global Dow—a 150-stock index of the world's leading blue-chips. The company has been a constituent of the Dow Jones Sustainability Index, the Dow Jones Sustainability Asia Pacific Index (DJSI Asia Pacific), and/or the Dow Jones Sustainability Asia Pacific 40 Index (DJSI Asia Pacific 40). Since 2010, CLP has also been listed on the Hang Seng Corporate Sustainability Index and Hang Seng (Mainland and HK) Corporate Sustainability Index.

== Electricity tariff ==
Basic tariff (1 January 2024 - 31 December 2024)

- https://www.clp.com.hk/content/dam/clphk/documents/tariff-adjustment-2024/TariffTable2024_CHI.pdf

Fuel cost adjustment

- https://www.clp.com.hk/zh/help-support/bills-payment-tariffs/fuel-cost-adjustment

== Markets outside Hong Kong ==
In recent years, CLP has sought to expand outside of its native Hong Kong, accomplishing this through mergers and acquisitions. Markets outside Hong Kong it has entered include Australia (through EnergyAustralia), India, Mainland China, Southeast Asia mainly (Thailand and Indonesia) and Taiwan.

Its first market outside Hong Kong was mainland China, where it began supplying power through connecting its power stations in Hong Kong to the mainland Chinese grid in 1979

The 1990s saw the start of expansionary M&A activity with CLP acquiring nearly a half-dozen companies between 1996 and 2005. In 1996 the company entered joint-ventures with Taiwan Cement Corporation; in 1998, part ownership of Thai Electricity Generating Public Co Ltd; and in 2001, Australian Yallourn Energy. It expanded operations in Australia to include retailing when it bought TXU Merchant Energy in 2005. And in 2002 CLP acquired an Indian company, Gujarat Paguthan Energy Corporation Private Limited.

== Power stations ==
CLP has a number of power stations in Asia. While most are either coal-fired or fossil fuel power stations, the company also generates electricity using nuclear, solar energy and wind power.

=== Hong Kong ===
Sources of electricity generated and provided by CLP in Hong Kong (2020)
1. Natural gas (48.0%)
2. Nuclear (Imported) (36.0%)
3. Coal (15.0%)
4. Renewable energy (1.00%)

Hong Kong sites include Black Point Power Station, Castle Peak Power Station, and Penny's Bay Power Station.

=== Mainland China ===
CLP was the equity investors of two power stations in Guangdong province, Daya Bay Nuclear Power Plant and Guangzhou Pumped Storage Power Station in Conghua, Guangzhou. It also operates a Guangxi province plant, Fangchenggang power station.

=== India ===
CLP power stations in India include gas powered Gujarat Paguthan Energy Corporation's former station Paguthan Combined Cycle Power Plant and a coal-fired power station Mahatma Gandhi Super Thermal Power Project at Jhajjar, Haryana, that was commissioned in 2012.

The company also has a number of wind power sites in the country. It has now signed up for its very first solar project – Veltoor at Telangana.

=== Australia ===
EnergyAustralia is a wholly owned subsidiary of CLP and is one of Australia's largest integrated energy businesses. As of 2013, EnergyAustralia generates electricity from coal, gas and renewable energy sources, and retails electricity and gas, of 5,662 MW to over 2.8 million residential and business users across Victoria, South Australia, New South Wales, the Australian Capital Territory and Queensland.

From 2005 until 2011, CLP Group held a 50% shareholding in Roaring 40s that operated wind farms in Australia, China, Hong Kong and India.

=== Southeast Asia and Taiwan ===
CLP established its presence in Southeast Asia and Taiwan in the early 1990s. Since then, they have built a portfolio of quality assets in the region.

Following the divestment of interest in EGCO in Thailand in early 2011, their investments currently consist of the Ho-Ping coal-fired project in Taiwan and the Lopburi solar farm in Thailand. They are also co-developing two coal-fired projects in Vietnam.
