= Hongkong Electric Company =

Electricity company in Hong Kong

Hongkong Electric Company 香港電燈有限公司

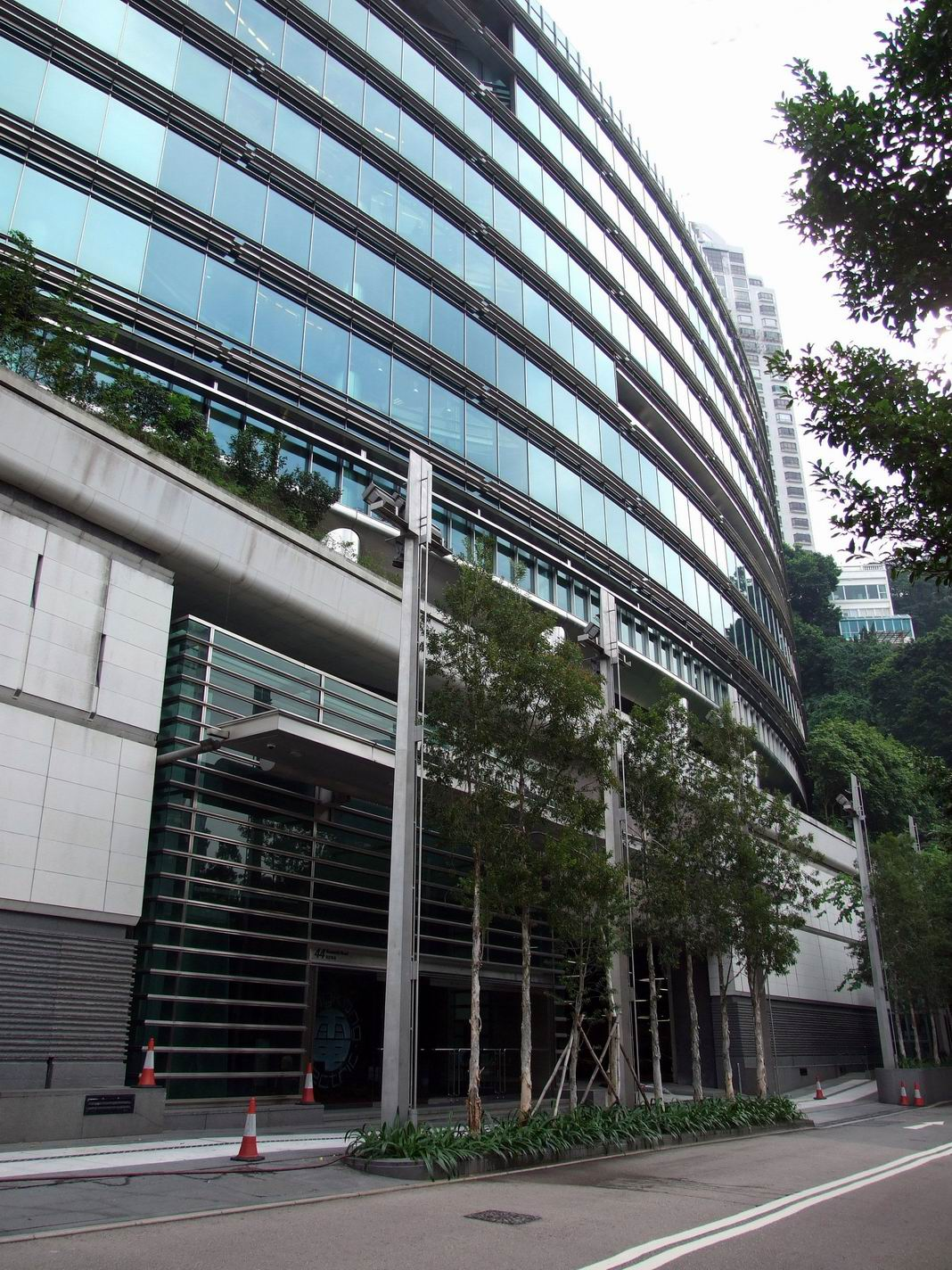
- Hongkong Electric Company headquarters in Mid-Levels, Hong Kong
- Trade name: HK Electric Investments and HK Electric Investments
- Type: Public
- Traded as: SEHK: 2638
- ISIN: HK0000179108
- Industry: Public utility
- Founded: 1 December 1890; 135 years ago in British Hong Kong
- Headquarters: Hongkong Electric Centre, 44 Kennedy Road, Mid-levels, Hong Kong
- Key people: WAN Chi Tin (CEO); FOK Kin Ning, Canning (chairman); LI Tzar Kuoi, Victor (deputy chairman)
- Products: Electric service
- Revenue: HK$ 11,344 million (2021)
- Total assets: ▲HK$114,828 million (2021); HK$111,567 million (2020)
- Number of employees: 1,682 (2022)
- Website: www.hkelectric.com

Hongkong Electric Company
- Traditional Chinese: 香港電燈有限公司
- Simplified Chinese: 香港电灯有限公司
Transcriptions
Standard Mandarin
- Hanyu Pinyin: Xiānggǎng Diàndēng Yǒuxiàngōngsī
Yue: Cantonese
- Jyutping: hoeng1 gong2 din6 dang1 jau5 haan6 gung1 si1

HK Electric
- Traditional Chinese: 港燈
- Simplified Chinese: 港灯
Transcriptions
Standard Mandarin
- Hanyu Pinyin: Gǎng Dēng
Yue: Cantonese
- Jyutping: gong2 dang1

The Hongkong Electric Company (HEC; Chinese: 香港電燈有限公司) is one of Hong Kong's two main electricity generation companies, the other being China Light & Power. The company is owned by several companies including Power Assets Holdings, State Grid Corporation of China, Cheung Kong Infrastructure Holdings and Qatar Investment Authority. It was the first company to provide electricity in Hong Kong, having run continually since the 19th century.

== History ==
Following a meeting in 188_ of the Executive Council to discuss land reclamation, Bendyshe Layton suggested to Sir Catchick Paul Chater that Hong Kong acquire an electricity generator. Chater, who was to remain a director of the new Hongkong Electric Company for 37 years, took charge of raising finance for the project. The total capital of $300,000 was divided into 30,000 shares, half of which were offered to the public. As a result, the first power station in Hong Kong was secretly built on the site of an old graveyard in Star Street, Wan Chai. The plant was designed by electrical engineer William Wickham who subsequently remained its manager until 1910. At 6:00 p.m. on 1 December 1890, 50 street lights along Queen's Road Central, Battery Path and Upper Albert Road were switched on. The lights failed on the second night then again one week later. Thereafter there were no further faults for 26 years. Street lighting was later extended west as far as Bonham Strand and Caine Road then later along Queens Road East and Wanchai Road to Mission Hospital Hill (site of the present Ruttonjee Hospital).

In the 1890s, as electricity became popular, the first private houses were connected to the company's supply to power lights and fans. On the commercial front, a substation was built in 1898 to service the lifts of the new tall buildings mushrooming along the waterfront. By 1905 the company was supplying power for 15 lifts, thousands of lamps as well as for street lighting. The power grid was extended underground to West Point then later to Victoria Peak and Shau Kei Wan. By 1916, Aberdeen and Ap Lei Chau were also connected. One by one large organisations like Dairy Farm, Taikoo Docks, the Peak Tram and the University of Hong Kong which had formerly generated their own supplies, switched to the company's supply. In 1924 there were 1,369 street lamps lit by gas with only 469 powered by electricity. However, by 1936, few gas lamps remained.

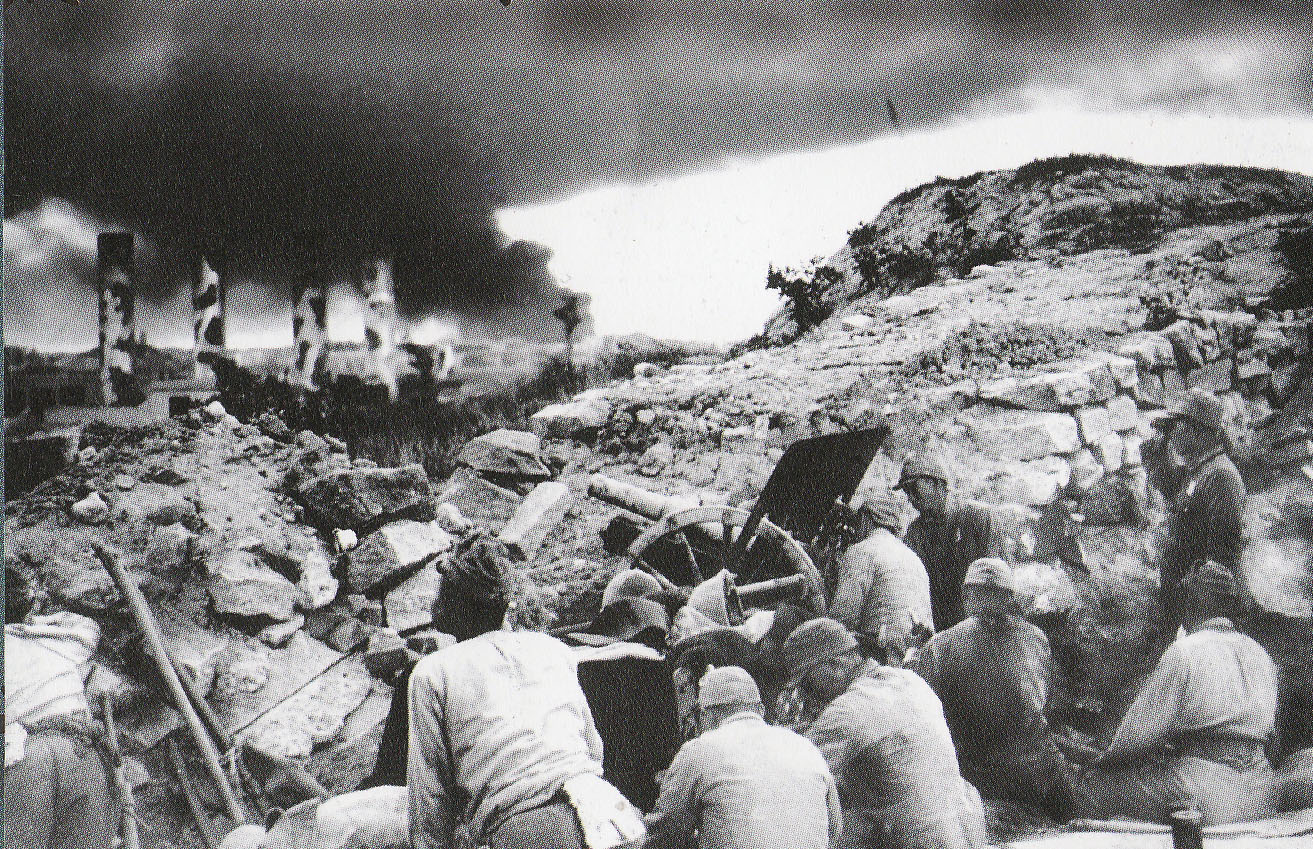
North Point Power Station during the Japanese invasion of Hong Kong in December 1941.

During the Japanese invasion of Hong Kong in December 1941, a number of staff at the North Point power plant held the Japanese at bay in an epic defence. Casualties from the battle included the plant's manager Vincent Sorby, who died in a prison camp of wounds received during the attack.

A second power plant was built in North Point in 1919 and a third at Ap Lei Chau in 1968 which was decommissioned in 1989. Since 1990, all of HEC's electric generators have been situated at the Lamma Power Station.

Hongkong Land (HKL), which owned a 34% stake in the company, underwent a restructuring in January 1985 whereby it was forced to sell its stake in the company for HK$3 billion to reduce debt levels.

The company is now controlled by Li Ka-shing's Cheung Kong Holdings as part of listed company Power Assets Holdings Limited, which before February 2011 was known as "Hongkong Electric Holdings Limited".

== Power generation ==
Sources of electricity generated by Hongkong Electric in 2021
1. Natural gas (48.3%)
2. Coal and oil (51.6%)
3. Renewable energy (0.06%)

=== Lamma Power Station ===
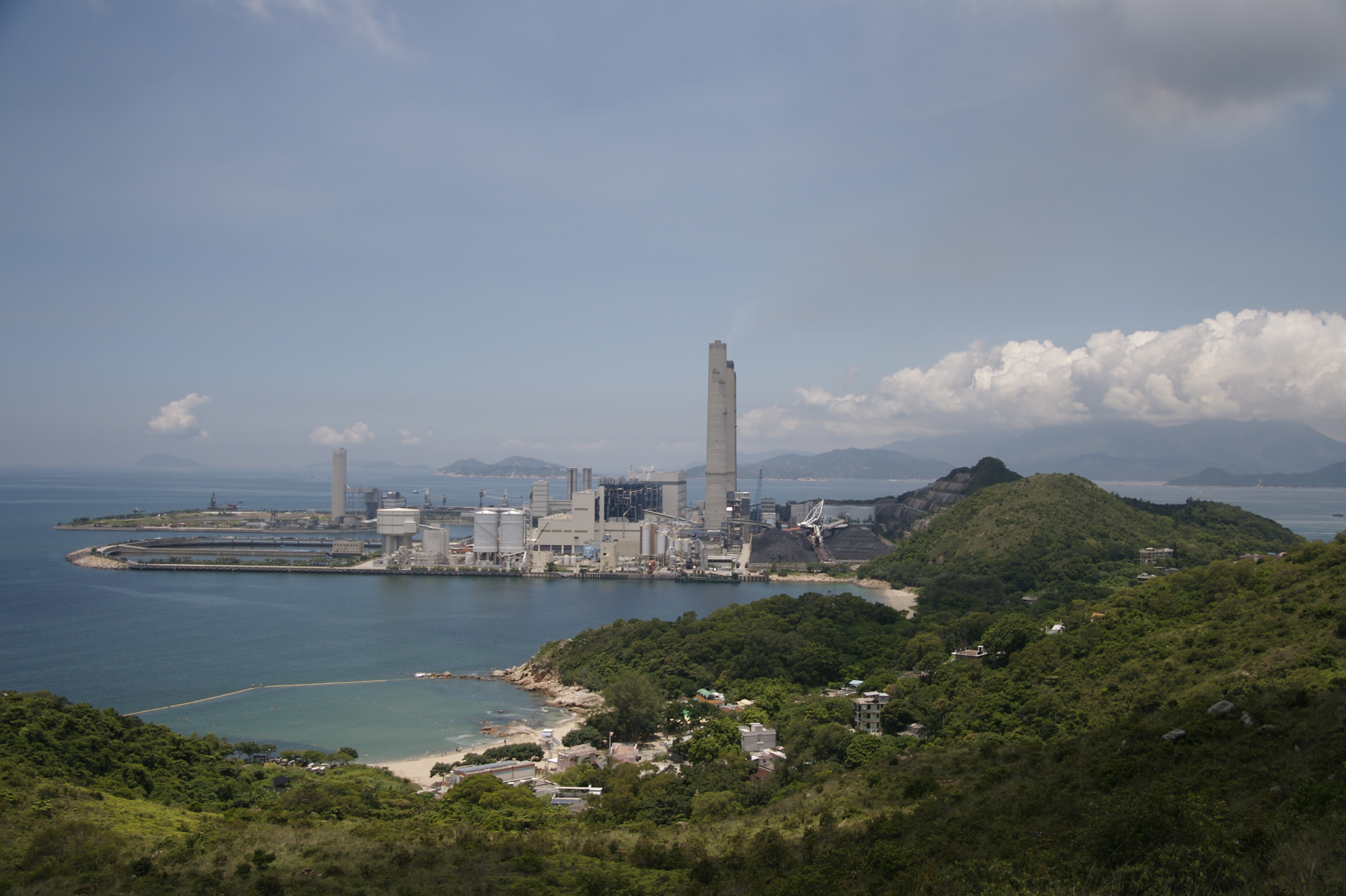
Lamma Power Station

Lamma Power Station is a 3,736 megawatts (5,010,000 hp) either (coal-fired, or combined cycle when used alongside natural gas). Built in 1982 as a 250-megawatt (340,000 hp) coal-fired station, it was upgraded to 600 megawatts (800,000 hp) in 1987 and to 1,350 megawatts (1,810,000 hp) by 1989.

=== Lamma Winds ===
Lamma Winds operates a Nordex standard N50 800-kilowatt (1,100 hp) wind turbine with a rotor diameter of 50 metres (160 ft). Completed in 2006, the turbine is of stall-regulated, "horizontal axis" design and is mounted up-wind.

=== Solar power system ===
In July 2010, the company commissioned the largest commercial-scale solar power system in Hong Kong. Based on amorphous silicon thin film photovoltaic (TFPV) technology, the requisite solar panels are located on the rooftops of the main building of Lamma Power Station. Power generated is fed directly to Hong Kong Electric's 380 V electrical grid via solar inverters, distribution boards and power transmission cables. All panels are set to face south to maximise power output and are inclined at an angle of 22 degrees. With an installed capacity of 550 kilowatts (740 hp), on completion in 2011 the plant's annual output is forecast at 620,000 kilowatt-hours (2,200,000 MJ).

== Electricity tariff ==
Tariff for residential clients

- https://www.hkelectric.com/zh/customer-services/billing-payment-electricity-tariffs/residential-tariff

Tariff for non-residential clients

- https://www.hkelectric.com/zh/customer-services/billing-payment-electricity-tariffs/non-residential-tariff

== Closed plants ==
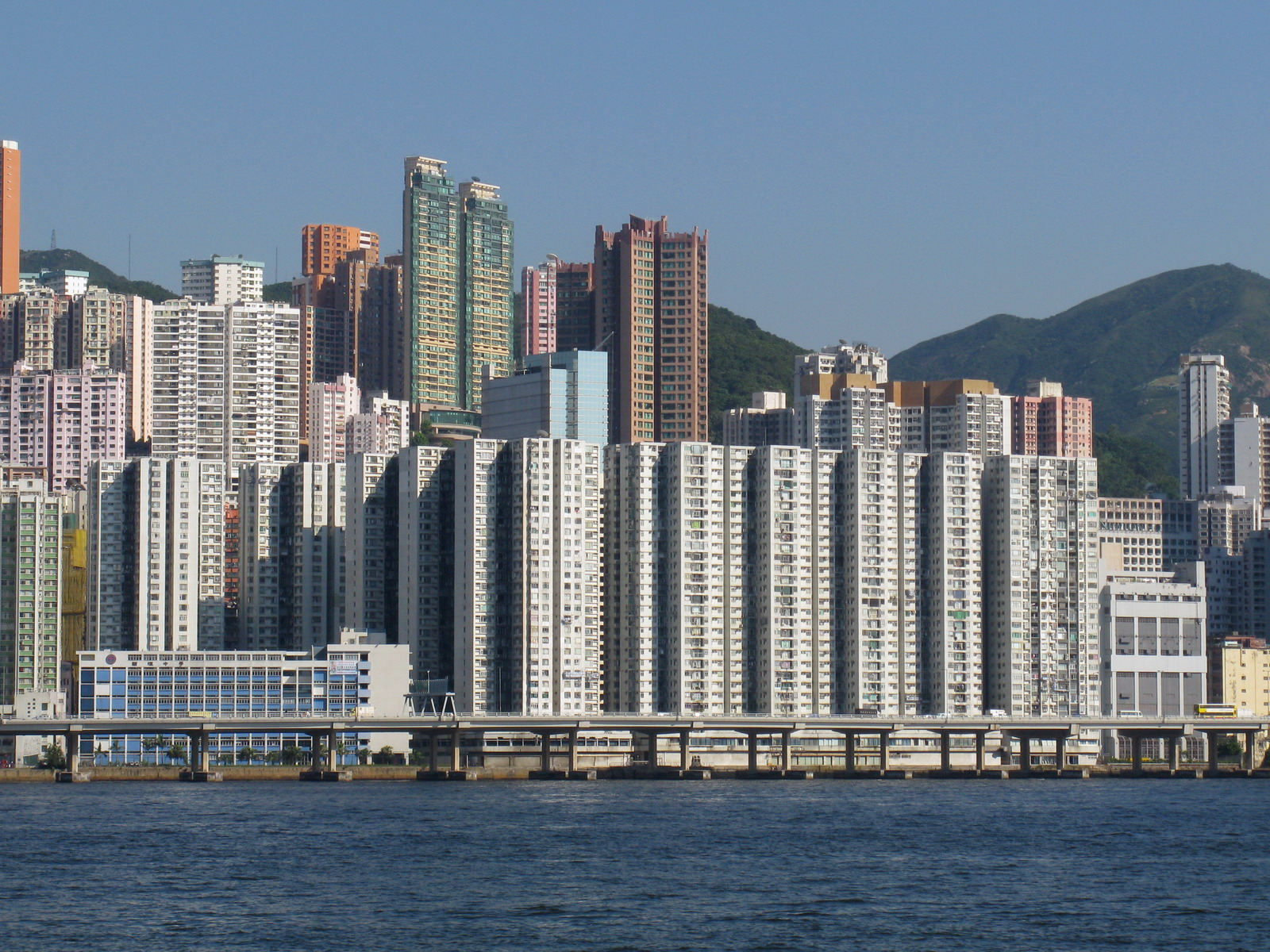
City Garden was built on the site of North Point Power Station.

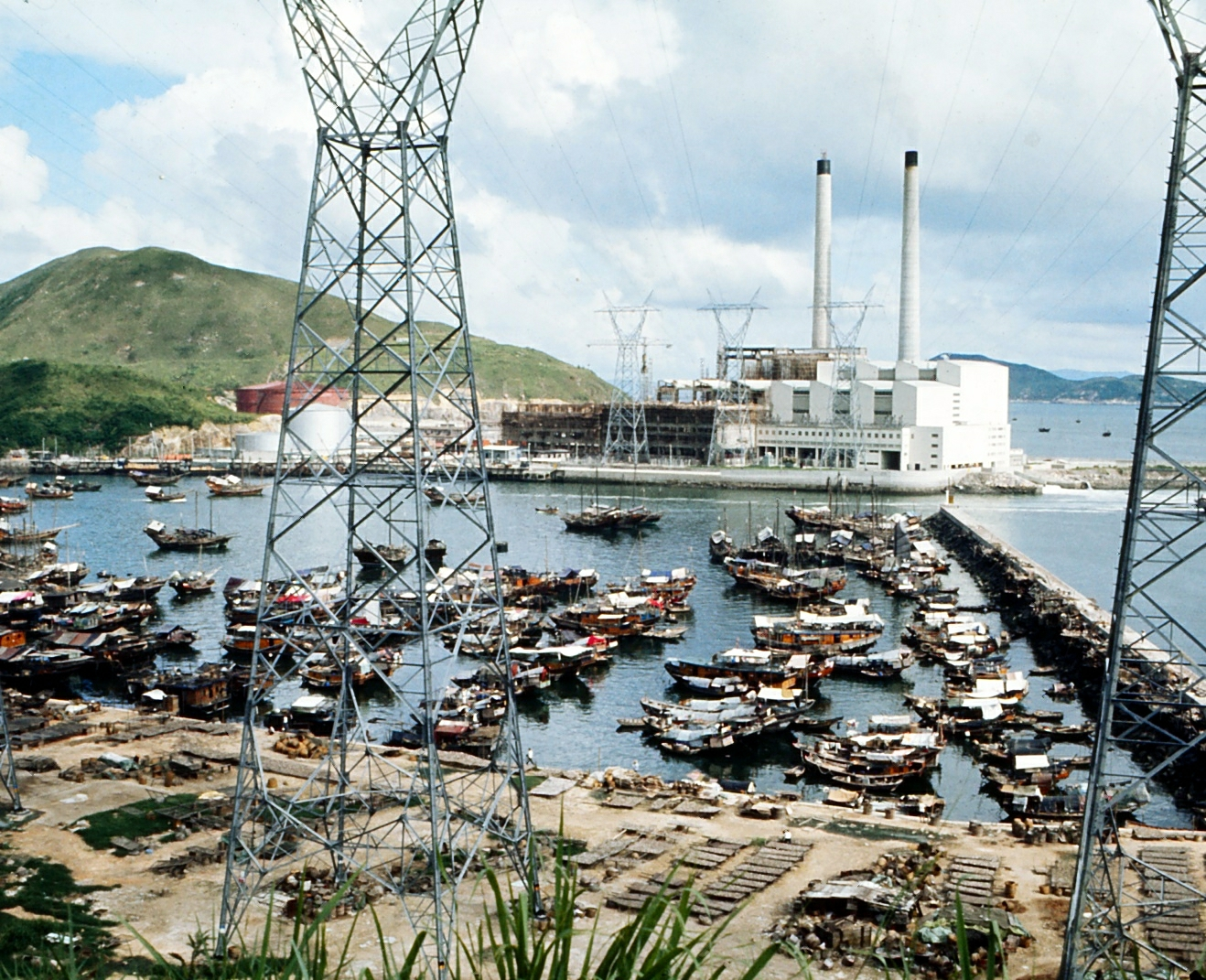
Ap Lei Chau Power Station in 1971.

Most of the older power stations were closed as residential development began to surround them. As HEC was owned by a land developer, these properties were in turn re-developed into housing estates.

=== Wan Chai ===
Wan Chai Power station was a 50 kilowatts (67 hp) coal-fired power station opened in 1890 and decommissioned in 1922. Built in the colonial architecture style, it was later demolished and is now the site of Art Deco residential flats at 31, Wing Fung Street.

=== North Point ===
The North Point Power Stations were a series of power stations built between 1919 and 1966. The site is now home to the City Garden residential flats and Maxim Mall.

- North Point Power Station (A) - 3,000 kilowatts (4,000 hp) coal-fired generating station opened in 1919 to replace Wan Chai station and decommissioned in 1989
- North Point Power Station (B) - 30 megawatts (40,000 hp) coal-fired generating station opened in 1958 and decommissioned in 1989
- North Point Power Station (C) - 60 megawatts (80,000 hp) oil-fired generating station opened in 1966 and decommissioned 1989

=== Ap Lei Chau Power Station ===
Opened in 1968, the Ap Lei Chau Power Station was a 750 megawatts (1,010,000 hp) oil-fired generating station. The plant was decommissioned and its generators moved to Lamma Power Station between 1984 and 1989; HEC office tower and building is now surrounded by the South Horizons housing estate, 34 towers built by Hutchison Whampoa.

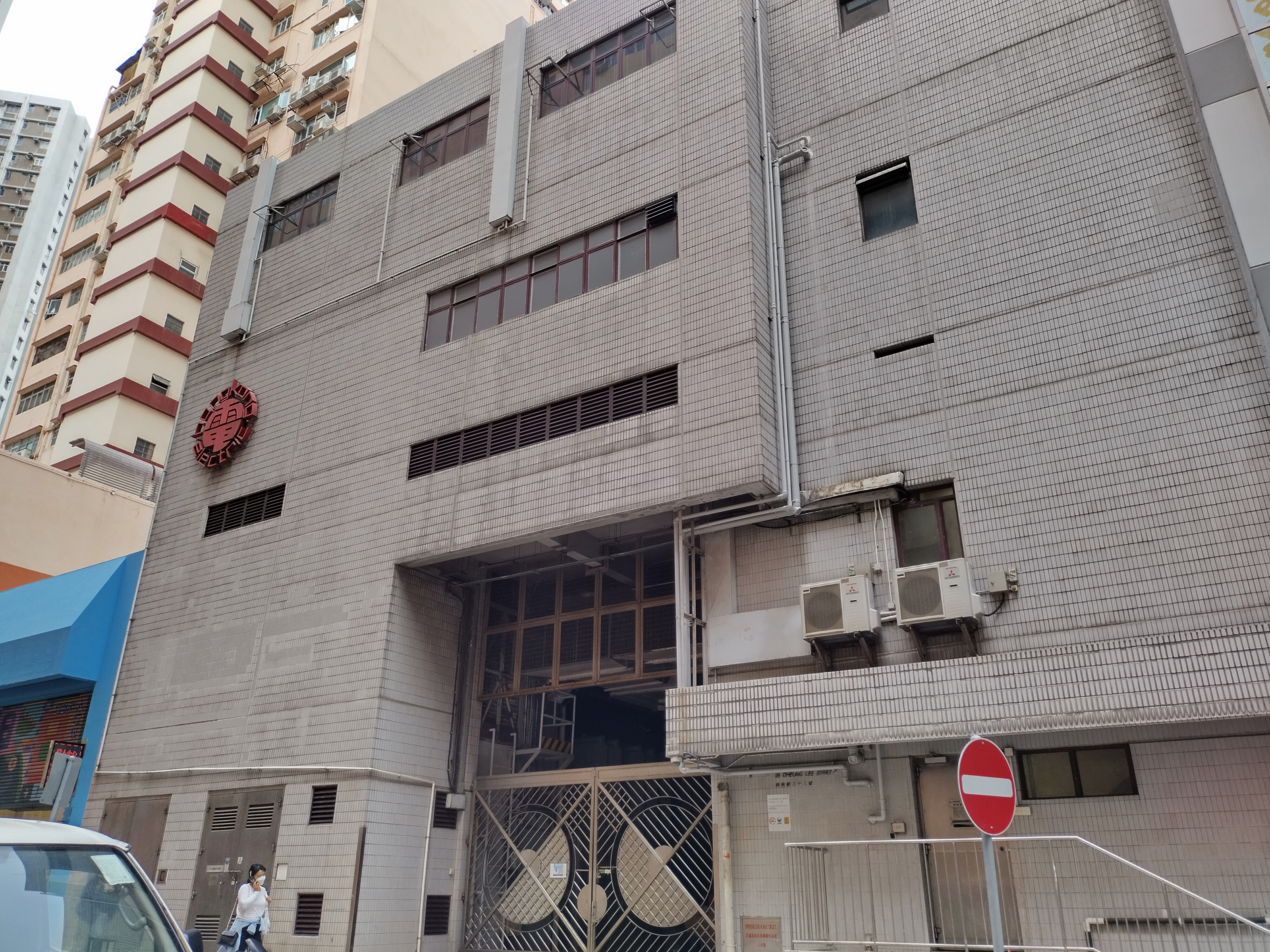
Hongkong Electric power substation in Cheung Lee Street, Chai Wan

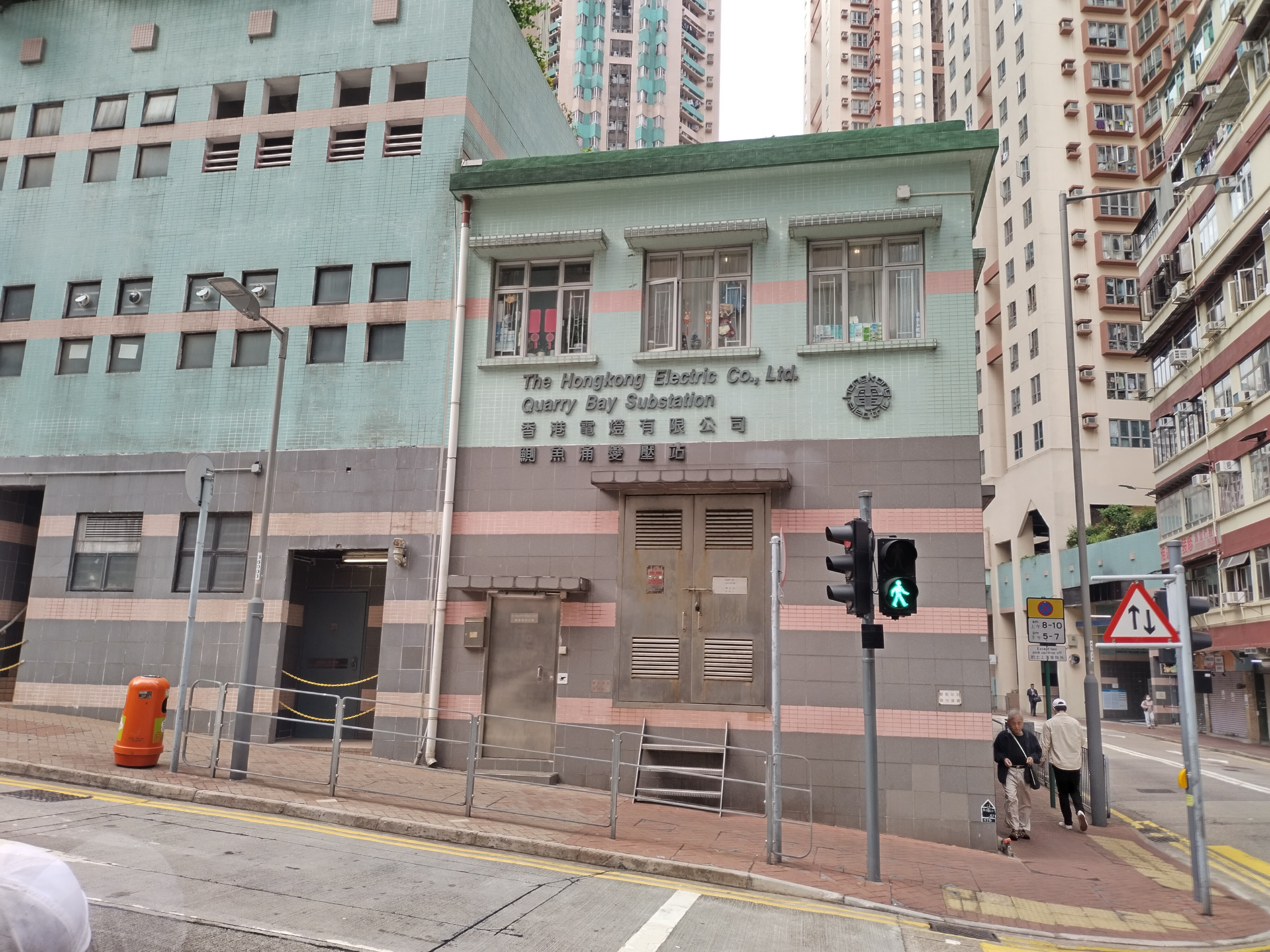
Hongkong Electric power substation in Healthy Street East, Quarry Bay
