= China Southern Power Grid =

Chinese electricity supplier

China Southern Power Grid 中国南方电网
- Type: State-owned enterprise
- Industry: Electric utility
- Founded: 2002
- Headquarters: Guangzhou, Guangdong, China
- Area served: China
- Key people: Qian Chaoyang (Board Director, President)
- Products: Electricity generation, transmission and distribution, natural gas
- Services: Retail Energy
- Revenue: US$ 118.8 billion (2023)
- Net income: US$ 2.3 billion (2023)
- Total assets: US$ 173.0 billion (2023)
- Number of employees: 268,471 (2023)
- Website: www.csg.cn

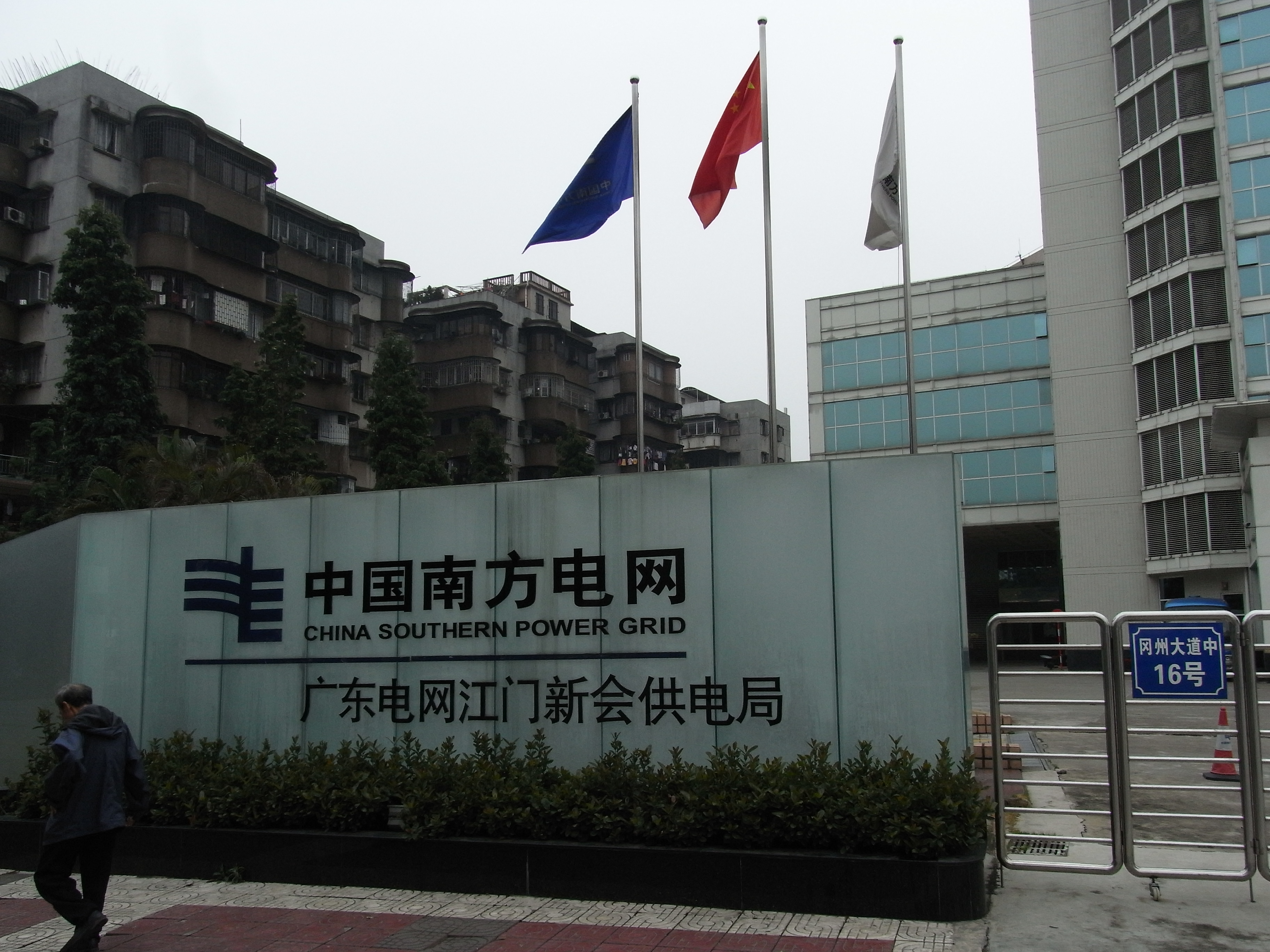
A bureau of China Southern Power Grid in Xinhui, Jiangmen

China Southern Power Grid Company Limited (CSG; Chinese: 中国南方电网; pinyin: Zhōngguó Nánfāng Diànwǎng) is one of the two Chinese state-owned enterprises established in 2002 in a power system reform promulgated by the State Council, the other being the State Grid Corporation of China (SGCC). It is overseen by the State-owned Assets Supervision and Administration Commission of the State Council and it manages investment, construction and management of power transmission, transformation and distribution covering China's five southern provinces of Guangdong, Guangxi, Yunnan, Guizhou and Hainan, while power generation is done by five other power generation groups. The company is headquartered in Guangzhou, Guangdong.

China Southern Power Grid accounts for 20% of the Chinese grid while SGCC accounts for the remaining 80%.

== Organizational structure ==
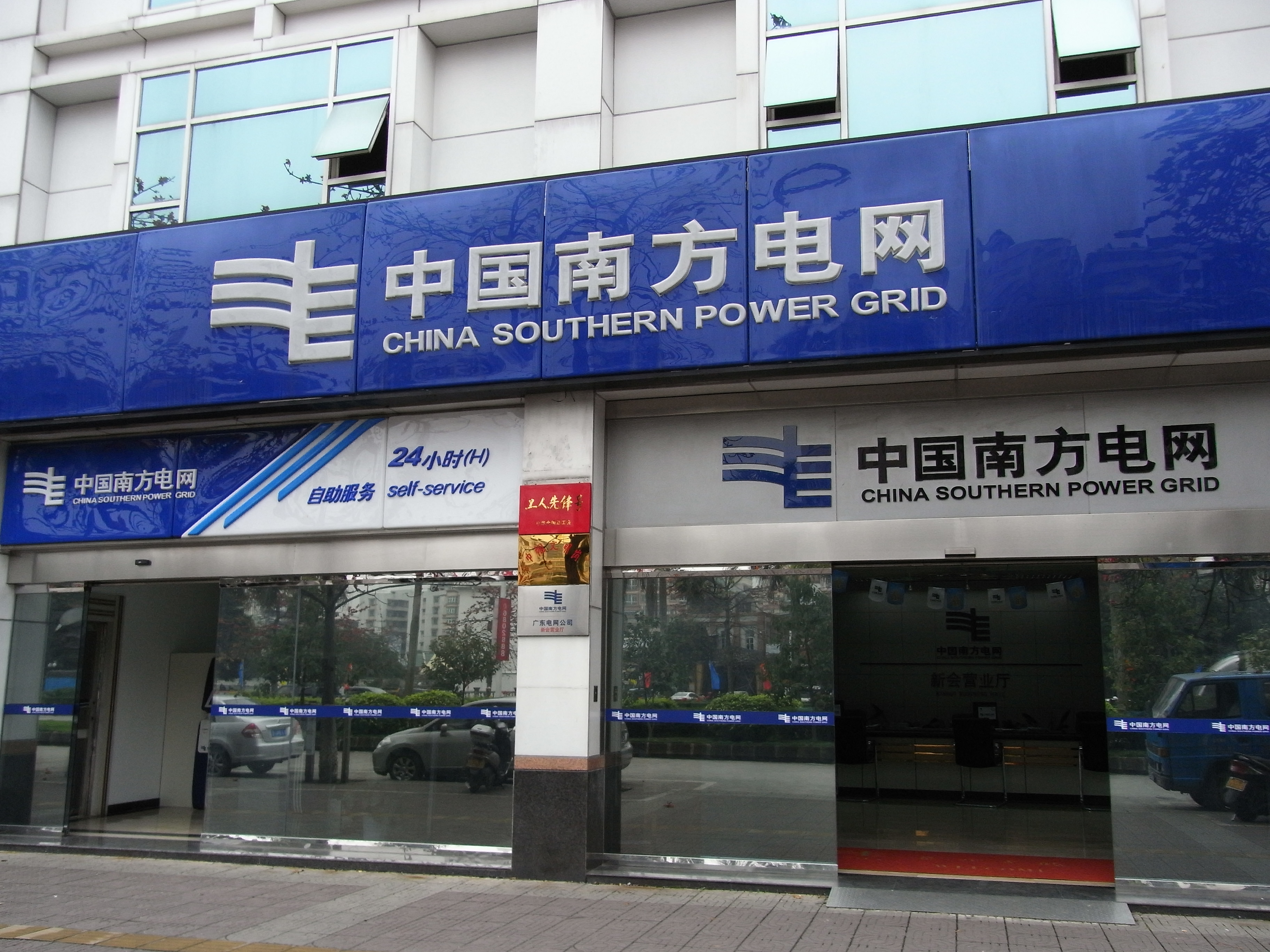
China Southern Power Grid Company shop in Xinhui, Guangdong.

China Southern Power Grid is organized in the following structure.

=== Administrative Departments ===
- General Office
- Strategy and Policy Department
- Procurement Department CAPEX
- Planning and Development Department
- Marketing and Trading Department
- Human Resource Department
- Finance Department
- Operation and Technology Department
- Safety Supervision Department
- Rural Electricity Administration Department
- International Cooperation Department
- Audit Department
- Inspection Bureau
- Party Affairs Department
- Pension Center
- Experts Commission

=== Subsidiaries ===
- Guangdong Power Grid Company
- Guangxi Power Grid Company
- Yunnan Power Grid Company
- Guizhou Power Grid Company
- Hainan Power Grid Company
- Guangzhou Power Supply Co., Ltd
- Shenzhen Power Supply Co., Ltd
- CSG International
- Dinghe Property Insurance Co., Ltd

=== Branch Companies ===
- EHV Power Transmissions Company
- CSG Power Transmission Company
- CSG Power Generation Plant
- CSG Technology Research Center

=== Stockholding Branch Company ===
- Finance Company

=== Affiliated Units ===
- CSG Load Dispatching and Communications Center
- Power Exchange Center
- Information Center

== See also ==
- State Grid Corporation of China
- List of companies of China
- Smart grid
