= Thorium-based nuclear power =

Nuclear energy extracted from thorium isotopes

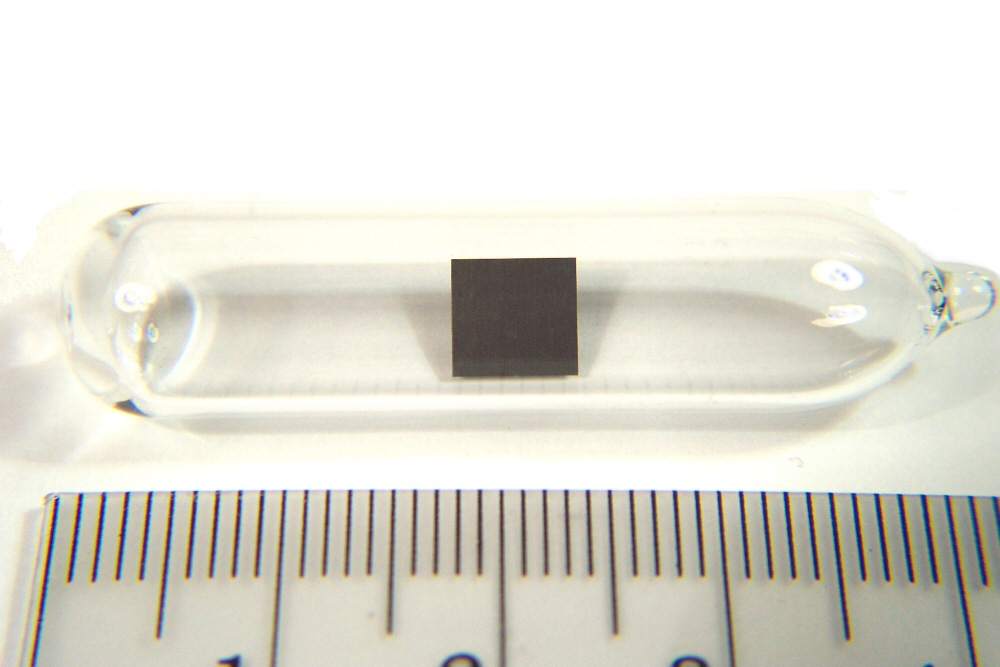
A sample of thorium

Thorium-based nuclear power generation is fueled primarily by the nuclear fission of the isotope uranium-233 produced from the fertile element thorium. A thorium fuel cycle can offer several potential advantages over a uranium fuel cycle (Note: A nuclear reactor consumes certain specific fissile isotopes to produce energy. As of the 2010s, the most common types of nuclear reactor fuel were: Uranium-235, purified (i.e. "enriched") by reducing the amount of uranium-238 in natural mined uranium. Most nuclear power has been generated using low-enriched uranium (LEU), whereas high-enriched uranium (HEU) is necessary for weapons.; Plutonium-239, transmuted from uranium-238 obtained from natural mined uranium.)—including the much greater abundance of thorium found on Earth, superior physical and nuclear fuel properties, and reduced nuclear waste production. Thorium fuel also has a lower weaponization potential because it is difficult to weaponize the uranium-233 that is bred in the reactor. Plutonium-239 is produced at much lower levels and can be consumed in thorium reactors.

Thorium was first used in a commercial reactor in 1962, at the Indian Point Energy Center. Since then, several other commercial reactors have been fueled using thorium, including light-water reactors and high-temperature gas-cooled reactors. The feasibility of a thorium fuel cycle at a large scale was demonstrated through the design, construction and successful operation of the thorium-based Light Water Breeder Reactor (LWBR) core installed at the Shippingport Atomic Power Station. The reactor of this power plant was designed to accommodate different cores. The thorium core was rated at 60 MW(e), produced power from 1977 through 1982 (producing over 2.1 billion kilowatt hours of electricity) and converted enough thorium-232 into uranium-233 to achieve a 1.014 breeding ratio. Indian heavy-water reactors have for a long time used thorium-bearing fuel alongside uranium and plutonium.

There was considerable interest in using thorium instead of uranium between the 1950s and 1970s, particularly in the United States and Germany, to supplement limited supplies of uranium. However, enthusiasm largely declined due to the discovery of large deposits of uranium. Worldwide interest in thorium fuel cycles picked up later due to interest in proliferation-resistant fuel cycles. Nuclear scientists Ralph W. Moir and Edward Teller (Note: Teller died shortly before the paper's publication.) suggested in 2005 that research on thorium-fueled molten-salt reactors should be restarted after a three-decade shutdown and that a small prototype plant should be built. Other countries have made commercial plans for thorium-based power plants on a national scale. In 2024, the Chinese TMSR-LF1 became the first operational molten-salt reactor to use thorium fuel.

In 2011, a group of scientists at the Georgia Institute of Technology assessed thorium-fueled molten-salt reactors as "a 1000+ year solution or a quality low-carbon bridge to truly sustainable energy sources solving a huge portion of mankind's negative environmental impact."

== History ==
The use of thorium to breed uranium-233 (^{233}U) was first discovered in 1940 by Glenn Seaborg, from the neutron bombardment of thorium in a cyclotron. During the Manhattan Project, after the construction of the X-10 Graphite Reactor, Seaborg quickly realized the potential of uranium-233 as a fissile material. Research continued throughout the Manhattan Project; however, it was largely sidelined in the weapons program in favor of plutonium. Following the end of the war, the weapons production reactors at the Hanford Site were loaded with thorium slugs to breed ^{233}U. At Oak Ridge, work continued on separation of ^{233}U for both military and civilian applications.

The newly-formed Atomic Energy Commission (AEC) began exploring the feasibility of commercial nuclear power. By this point, pressurized water reactors (PWRs) using enriched uranium were being developed by the AEC's Naval Reactors division for use in propelling nuclear submarines. In 1954, the AEC began a five-year power reactor development program to explore reactors suitable for commercial electricity generation. In March 1954, the AEC's Subcommittee on Research and Development presented the Commission with a report on kickstarting a commercial nuclear industry. The subcommittee identified five reactor concepts for development, including the PWR, Sodium Graphite Reactor, boiling water reactor, fast breeder reactor, and homogeneous reactor. The homogeneous reactor, which was to be a thorium-fueled thermal breeder reactor, was judged as the most promising reactor concept for economic nuclear power due to its simple design, lack of fuel fabrication, and ease of extracting ^{233}U. The sodium graphite reactor concept was also examined for its ability to function as a thorium breeder reactor.

The AEC then proposed to build demonstration reactors for each concept, including the Shippingport Atomic Power Station (PWR), Sodium Reactor Experiment (SGR), Experimental Boiling Water Reactor (BWR), Experimental Breeder Reactor II (FBR), and Homogeneous Reactor Experiment II (HR). The AEC also proposed an additional, larger demonstration plant for the homogeneous thorium concept, tentatively called the Homogeneous Thorium Reactor (HTR), which was to demonstrate the breeding of ^{233}U in a commercial plant. The 16 MW_{e} HTR was expected to begin operation in 1959. Westinghouse and the Pennsylvania Power & Light Company initiated studies in 1955 and proposed a prototype power plant in 1959, however the plant was not constructed.

The first commercial nuclear plant to use thorium in its fuel was Indian Point Unit 1, which went critical in August 1962. Indian Point was built to demonstrate the thorium fuel cycle in a commercial reactor and was fueled with a mixture of thorium and highly-enriched uranium (HEU). In fact, the plant was originally referred to as the Consolidated Edison Thorium Reactor. However, the high cost of the HEU fuel combined with the high cost of thorium reprocessing led the operator, Consolidated Edison, to switch to low-enriched uranium instead. The high cost of thorium reprocessing was described as a "financial disaster", and the thorium core was instead disposed of as waste without significant reprocessing.

In 1963, Naval Reactors had proposed the use of a seed-blanket core to allow light-water reactors to run on a thorium fuel cycle. Such reactors would be capable of highly efficient fuel utilization, including the prospect of breeding. By 1964, concerns over the supply of nuclear fuel led the AEC to prioritize improved utilization of uranium and thorium. The AEC began an advanced converters program, which identified the heavy-water reactor, high-temperature gas-cooled reactor (HTGR), thorium seed-blanket LWR, and SGR as desirable concepts. The advanced converters program was later focused on development of a thorium-fueled, heavy-water organic-cooled reactor (HWOCR), however research on both the HTGR and seed-blanket reactor continued. The HWOCR was a joint project with Atomic Energy of Canada Limited. It was cancelled in 1967, as the AEC shifted its focus towards breeder plants.

The AEC promoted the construction of high-temperature gas-cooled reactors fueled with thorium and ^{233}U. The first such reactor, Peach Bottom Unit 1, used a thorium-HEU mixture. It served as a prototype for the later Fort Saint Vrain Nuclear Power Plant. Fort Saint Vrain, which used similar thorium fuel, was plagued with unrelated operational issues that led to its early closure. The Fort Saint Vrain plant was intended as a demonstration of future 1000 MW_{e} thorium fuel cycle plants with the possibility of operating as thorium breeders. Several utilities had placed orders with General Atomics to build several of these large reactors. However, financial issues in the utility industry caused these plants to be cancelled.

The AEC used the weapons production reactors at Hanford to breed significant quantities of ^{233}U from thorium for use in both nuclear weapons and for civilian research. Several tons of uranium-233 were bred from thorium in AEC reactors, some of which was processed at the Rocky Flats Plant. Uranium-233 was used in the MET shot of the Operation Teapot series of nuclear tests. According to Chuck Hansen, uranium-233 was evaluated for its potential in substituting for supergrade plutonium in nuclear weapons, however it was deemed as equivalent to plutonium in its usefulness. The further refinement of weapon designs, in particular the use of boosted fission weapons that did not require such high-grade plutonium, curtailed military interest in ^{233}U. Several ^{233}U-based nuclear weapons were tested by the United States between 1955 and 1968.

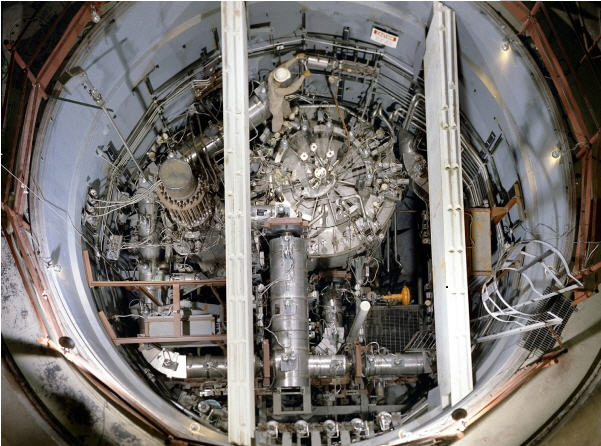
Early thorium-based (MSR) nuclear reactor at Oak Ridge National Laboratory in the 1960s

The aqueous homogeneous thorium reactor concept was abandoned by the AEC in the early 1960s in favor of the related molten-salt reactor design. The AEC funded the construction of the Molten-Salt Reactor Experiment, a prototype molten salt reactor, using uranium-233 fuel. The MSRE reactor, built at Oak Ridge National Laboratory, operated critical for roughly 15,000 hours from 1965 to 1969 (at a power level somewhat under 8 MWth). In 1968, Glenn Seaborg, the chairman of the AEC, publicly announced that a ^{233}U-based reactor had been successfully developed and tested. For its final year of operation, the reactor was briefly fueled with plutonium fluoride. The project's leaders also proposed a test run using plutonium fuel, however this was never carried out due to the project's cancellation. In 1969, Seaborg publicly proclaimed that, "...someday the world will have commercial power reactors of both the uranium-plutonium and the thorium-uranium types".

In 1970, the AEC's Division of Technical Information published a booklet, Thorium and the Third Fuel, as part of its Understanding the Atom educational series aimed at increasing public understanding of nuclear energy. The booklet stated that thorium was unlikely to replace uranium-235 or plutonium as the principal reactor fuel, but predicted that several reactors were likely to be developed using it. It highlighted the molten-salt breeder reactor as perhaps "...the most exciting of all prospects for using thorium".

Despite the project's apparent success, the MSRE was shut down in December 1969 due to pressure from Milton Shaw, the director of the AEC's Reactor Development and Testing Division. At the time, the US government was heavily interested in breeder reactors to meet the projected need for nuclear fuel. Shaw pressured the MSRE team, led by Oak Ridge director Alvin Weinberg, to end the project due to his preference for the other competing breeder design at the time, the liquid metal fast breeder reactor.

By 1973, due to Shaw's influence, the US government had essentially settled on uranium technology and largely discontinued thorium-related nuclear research. The reasons were that uranium-fueled reactors were considered more efficient, the research into uranium was proven and thorium's breeding ratio was thought insufficient to produce enough fuel to support development of a commercial nuclear industry. As Moir and Teller later wrote, "The competition came down to a liquid metal fast breeder reactor (LMFBR) on the uranium-plutonium cycle and a thermal reactor on the thorium-^{233}U cycle, the molten salt breeder reactor. The LMFBR had a larger breeding rate ... and won the competition." In their opinion, the decision to stop development of thorium reactors, at least as a backup option, "was an excusable mistake". The government pushed ahead with the LMFBR design with the Clinch River Breeder Reactor Project starting in 1970, however the project encountered substantial political opposition and was finally cancelled in 1983.

In 2009, science writer Richard Martin claimed that Weinberg, who was director at Oak Ridge and primarily responsible for the MSRE, lost his job as director because he championed development of thorium reactors. At the time, Martin claimed that Weinberg's unwillingness to sacrifice potentially safe nuclear power for the benefit of military uses forced him to retire. However, in his 2012 book SuperFuel, Martin refuted the idea that thorium was rejected by the AEC because of the desire for weapons production:

The theory is now repudiated not only by more circumspect scientists like Jess Gehin, a senior program manager for reactor technology at Oak Ridge, but by many in the thorium movement. The evidence that Shaw and the AEC killed the MSBR specifically because it wasn't an efficient producer of weapons-grade plutonium is thin. But that misses the point.

Others, including nuclear engineer Nick Touran, have agreed that thorium was not deprioritized due to a focus on weaponization. Touran wrote that "when MSRs were finally given their chance in the 1950s and 60s, their (non-existent) inability to make bombs was not to blame for the cancellation". Touran also called out Martin's 2009 article for promoting this myth. Similarly, Jess Gehin, a senior manager at Oak Ridge and professor at the University of Tennessee, criticized Martin's book SuperFuel for confusing the benefits of the liquid fluoride thorium reactor design with benefits intrinsic to thorium itself and for many incorrect technical claims.

Even after the cancellation of the MSRE, thorium research continued. Admiral Hyman Rickover, the developer of naval nuclear propulsion and head of the US Naval Reactors office, had pushed for a thorium-fueled breeder project since 1963 and organized the construction of a light-water breeder reactor (LWBR) project. First reaching criticality on August 26, 1977, this project successfully turned the Shippingport Atomic Power Station, the first peacetime nuclear power plant, into a demonstration ^{232}Th−^{233}U breeder reactor. After successful operation until 1982, the reactor was found to have a breeding ratio of 1.4%.

In Germany, the AVR pebble-bed reactor utilized mixed-oxide ^{235}U−^{232}Th TRISO fuel, and operated from 1967 until 1988. Based on the AVR design, the Thorium High-Temperature Reactor (THTR-300), a 300MWe commercial reactor was constructed and commenced operation in 1985. However, both reactors were plagued with design issues. THTR-300 was shut down in 1989, after only four years of operation.

In the Netherlands, the KEMA laboratories operated an experimental aqueous homogeneous reactor called the KEMA Suspension Test Reactor (KSTR). The 1 MW_{th} KSTR was composed of 5 μm thorium and highly-enriched uranium oxide particles suspended in light water. It was designed as a test reactor for thorium-cycle AHR power plants.

Despite the documented history of thorium nuclear power, and successful demonstration of thorium-based breeding by the operation of the LWBR core at Shippingport, by 2009 many nuclear experts were nonetheless unaware of it. According to Chemical & Engineering News, "most people—including scientists—have hardly heard of the heavy-metal element and know little about it", noting a comment by a conference attendee that "it's possible to have a Ph.D. in nuclear reactor technology and not know about thorium energy."

Others, including former NASA scientist and prominent thorium advocate Kirk Sorensen, agree that "thorium was the alternate path". According to Sorensen, during a documentary interview, he states that if the US had not discontinued its research in 1974 it could have "probably achieved energy independence by around 2000".

On 18 May 2022, US Senator Tommy Tuberville introduced US Senate bill S.4242 – "A bill to provide for the preservation and storage of uranium-233 to foster development of thorium molten-salt reactors", the 'Thorium Energy Security Act'. However, it was not adopted by Congress.

== Benefits ==
- Abundance. Thorium is three times as abundant as uranium and nearly as abundant as lead and gallium in the Earth's crust. Rare-earth mineral deposits also contain significant quantities of thorium, which is then extracted as a byproduct of rare-earth mining. Thorium deposits are also more evenly distributed across the world than uranium deposits. This prevents a few countries from exerting dominance on thorium prices and ensures price stability for thorium fuels.
- Less suitable for bombs. It is difficult to make a practical nuclear bomb from a thorium reactor's by-products, allowing governments to potentially pursue further nuclear power without worsening nuclear arms proliferation. Thorium is not fissile like uranium, so packed thorium nuclei will not begin to split apart and explode. However the uranium-233 used in the cycle is fissile and hence can be used to create a nuclear weapon though plutonium production is reduced. According to Alvin Radkowsky, designer of the world's first full-scale atomic electric power plant, "a thorium reactor's plutonium production rate would be less than 2 percent of that of a standard reactor, and the plutonium's isotopic content would make it unsuitable for a nuclear detonation." Several uranium-233 bombs have been tested, but the presence of uranium-232 tended to "poison" the uranium-233 in two ways: intense radiation from the uranium-232 made the material difficult to handle, and the uranium-232 led to possible pre-detonation. Separating the uranium-232 from the uranium-233 proved very difficult, although newer laser isotope separation techniques could facilitate that process. In the United States, the AEC and DOE processed several kilograms of uranium-233 at Rocky Flats, and successfully used multiple chemical isolation steps to isolate uranium-232 decay products.
- Less nuclear waste. The thorium fuel cycle produces less high-level nuclear waste than the once-through uranium fuel cycle. This is because the thorium cycle produces fewer minor actinides (eg. neptunium, americium, californium) and plutonium than cycles using ^{238}U. The radiotoxicity and long lifetime of high-level waste is dominated by the minor actinides and plutonium. Thus, thorium cycle fuels reduce the lifetime and storage requirements of high-level waste. However, the thorium cycle also produces other long-lived actinides such as ^{231}Pa, ^{229}Th, and ^{230}U that may contribute to long-lived radiotoxicity as well. The production of activation products and fission products is also broadly similar between thorium and uranium based fuel cycles.
- Harvesting weapons-grade plutonium. Mixed-oxide thorium-plutonium fuel is more attractive for destroying excess weapons-grade plutonium (WPu) in a once-through cycle as opposed to uranium-plutonium fuel since the former does not breed more plutonium during operation. A fast-neutron reactor fueled with thorium could effectively burn excess plutonium without generating additional plutonium in the process, unlike a uranium-plutonium fast reactor. Plutonium fuel could be used instead of ^{233}U to start up a thorium breeder reactor. Thus, a transition to thorium could be done through the incineration of weapons grade plutonium (WPu) or civilian plutonium.
- Easier Mining. Mining thorium is safer and more efficient than mining uranium. Thorium's ore, monazite, generally contains higher concentrations of thorium than the percentage of uranium found in its respective ore. This makes thorium a more cost efficient and less environmentally damaging fuel source. Thorium mining is also easier and less dangerous than uranium mining, as the mine is an open pit—which requires no ventilation, unlike underground uranium mines, where radon levels can be potentially harmful.

== Disadvantages ==
- Significant and expensive testing, analysis and licensing work would be required, requiring business and government support. In a 2012 report on the use of thorium fuel with existing water-cooled reactors, the Bulletin of the Atomic Scientists suggested that it would "require too great an investment and provide no clear payoff", and that "from the utilities' point of view, the only legitimate driver capable of motivating pursuit of thorium is economics".
- The cost of fabrication and reprocessing is higher than using traditional solid fuel rods.
- Thorium, when irradiated for use in reactors, makes uranium-232, which emits gamma rays. This irradiation process may be altered slightly by removing protactinium-233. The decay of the protactinium-233 would then create uranium-233 in lieu of uranium-232 for use in nuclear weapons—making thorium into a dual purpose fuel.
- The melting point of thorium dioxide (3350 °C) is greater than that of uranium dioxide (2800 °C), resulting in a need for increased sintering temperature or addition of non-reactive sintering aids to produce thorium dioxide-based fuel.
- Thorium is a fertile material, rather than a fissile one. This means that the fuel must be used in conjunction with a separate fissile material, such as uranium or plutonium, in order to start and maintain the chain reaction required to generate power.
- Thorium has relatively low applicability in non-nuclear power generation settings, resulting in a very small demand for exploring thorium reserves.

== Proponents ==
Nobel laureate in physics and former director of CERN Carlo Rubbia has long been a fan of thorium. According to Rubbia, "In order to be vigorously continued, nuclear power must be profoundly modified".

Hans Blix, former director general of the International Atomic Energy Agency, has said "Thorium fuel gives rise to waste that is smaller in volume, less toxic and much less long lived than the wastes that result from uranium fuel".

== Power projects ==
Research and development of thorium-based nuclear reactors, primarily the liquid fluoride thorium reactor (LFTR), MSR design, has been or is now being done in the United States, United Kingdom, Germany, Brazil, India, Indonesia, China, France, the Czech Republic, Japan, Russia, Canada, Israel, Denmark and the Netherlands. Conferences with experts from as many as 32 countries are held, including one by the European Organization for Nuclear Research (CERN) in 2013, which focuses on thorium as an alternative nuclear technology without requiring production of nuclear waste. Among other recognized experts, Hans Blix, former head of the International Atomic Energy Agency, calls for expanded support of new nuclear power technology, and states, "the thorium option offers the world not only a new sustainable supply of fuel for nuclear power but also one that makes better use of the fuel's energy content."

Recent assessments by international agencies and industry groups describe thorium-based fuel cycles as a possible long-term option for low-carbon baseload power, noting potential advantages in fuel abundance, high burn-up and some waste characteristics, while also emphasizing that most designs remain at the research, test or early demonstration stage.

=== Canada ===
CANDU reactors are capable of using thorium. In 2018, the New Brunswick Energy Solutions Corporation announced the participation of Moltex Energy in the nuclear research cluster that will work on research and development of small modular reactor technology.

=== China ===
At the 2011 annual conference of the Chinese Academy of Sciences, it was announced that "China has initiated a research and development project in thorium MSR technology." The World Nuclear Association notes that the China Academy of Sciences in January 2011 announced its R&D program, "claiming to have the world's largest national effort on it, hoping to obtain full intellectual property rights on the technology." According to Martin, "China has made clear its intention to go it alone," adding that China already has a monopoly over most of the world's rare earth minerals.

In early 2012, it was reported that China, using components produced by the West and Russia, planned to build two prototypes, one of them a molten salt-cooled pebble-bed reactor by 2015, and a research molten salt reactor by 2017, had budgeted the project at $400 million and requiring 400 workers. China also finalized an agreement with a Canadian nuclear technology company to develop improved CANDU reactors using thorium and uranium as a fuel.

Dr. Jiang Mianheng, son of China's former leader Jiang Zemin, led a thorium delegation in non-disclosure talks at Oak Ridge National Laboratory, Tennessee, and by late 2013 China had officially partnered with Oak Ridge to aid China in its own development.

In March 2014, with their reliance on coal-fired power having become a major cause of their current "smog crisis", they reduced their original goal of creating a working reactor from 25 years down to 10. "In the past, the government was interested in nuclear power because of the energy shortage. Now they are more interested because of smog", said Professor Li Zhong, a scientist working on the project. "This is definitely a race", he added.

By 2019 two of the reactors were under construction in the Gobi desert, with completion expected around 2025. China expects to put thorium reactors into commercial use by 2030. The 60 MWt reactor is scheduled to be completed in 2029. Part of the thermal energy, 10 MW will be used to create electrical power; the remainder will be used to evolve hydrogen by splitting water molecules at high temperature.

==== TMSR-LF1 ====
One of the 2 MWt thorium prototypes, was nearing completion in 2021. As of 24 June 2021, China has reported that the Gobi molten salt reactor will be completed on schedule with tests beginning as early as September 2021. The new reactor is a part of Chinese leader Xi Jinping's drive to make China carbon-neutral by 2060. China hopes to complete the world's first commercial thorium reactor by 2030 and has planned to further build more thorium power plants across the low populated deserts and plains of western China, as well as up to 30 nations involved in China's Belt and Road Initiative.

In August 2022, the Chinese Ministry of Ecology and Environment informed the Shanghai Institute of Applied Physics (SINAP) that its commissioning plan for the LF1 had been approved.

On 16 June 2023, China's National Nuclear Safety Administration issued a license to the Shanghai Institute of Applied Physics (SINAP) of the Chinese Academy of Sciences to operate TMSR-LF1, a 2 MWt reactor.

In October 2023, the reactor went critical; in June 2024, the reactor reached full power (2 MWt); by October 2024, fresh Thorium replenished the molten-salt fuel of the reactor, in a first.

=== Denmark ===
Copenhagen Atomics is a Danish molten salt technology company developing mass manufacturable molten salt reactors. The Copenhagen Atomics Waste Burner is a single-fluid, heavy water moderated, fluoride-based, thermal spectrum and autonomously controlled molten-salt reactor. This is designed to fit inside of a leak-tight, 40-foot (12 m), stainless steel shipping container. The heavy water moderator is thermally insulated from the salt and continuously drained and cooled to below 50 °C (122 °F). A molten lithium-7 deuteroxide (7LiOD) moderator version is also being researched. The reactor utilizes the thorium fuel cycle using separated plutonium from spent nuclear fuel as the initial fissile load for the first generation of reactors, eventually transitioning to a thorium breeder. Copenhagen Atomics is actively developing and testing valves, pumps, heat exchangers, measurement systems, salt chemistry and purification systems, and control systems and software for molten salt applications.

In July 2024, Copenhagen Atomics announced that their reactor is ready to be tested in a real life scenario with a critical experiment at the Paul Scherrer Institute in Switzerland in 2026.

=== Germany, 1980s ===
The German THTR-300 was a prototype commercial power station using thorium as fertile and highly enriched U-235 as fissile fuel. Though named thorium high temperature reactor, mostly U-235 was fissioned. The THTR-300 was a helium-cooled high-temperature reactor with a pebble-bed reactor core consisting of approximately 670,000 spherical fuel compacts each 6 centimetres (2.4 in) in diameter with particles of uranium-235 and thorium-232 fuel embedded in a graphite matrix. It fed power to Germany's grid for 432 days in the late 1980s, before it was shut down for cost, mechanical and other reasons.

=== India ===
India has the largest supplies of thorium in the world, with comparatively poor quantities of uranium. Its government has projected meeting as much as 30% of its electrical demands through thorium by 2050.

India is amongst a handful of countries in the world with a detailed, funded, government-approved plan to focus on thorium-based nuclear power. The country currently gets under 2% of its electricity from nuclear power, with the rest coming from coal (60%), hydroelectricity (16%), other renewable sources (12%) and natural gas (9%). In 2012, the government expected to eventually produce around 25% of its electricity from nuclear power. In 2009 the chairman of the Indian Atomic Energy Commission said that India has a "long-term objective goal of becoming energy-independent based on its vast thorium resources to meet India's economic ambitions."

KAMINI (Kalpakkam Mini reactor), is India's only thorium-based experimental reactor. It produces 30 kW of thermal energy at full power. KAMINI is cooled and moderated by light water, and fuelled with uranium-233 metal produced by the thorium fuel cycle harnessed by the neighbouring FBTR reactor.

==== Prototype Fast Breeder Reactor ====
The 500 MWe Prototype Fast Breeder Reactor (PFBR), a commercial prototype of the FBR-600 fast reactor, was initially planned to be completed in September 2010, but experienced several delays. It reached criticality, producing more energy than it consumed, on 6th April 2026.

In late June 2012, India announced that their "first commercial fast reactor" was near completion. "We have huge reserves of thorium. The challenge is to develop technology for converting this to fissile material," stated Srikumar Banerjee, the former Chairman of India's Atomic Energy Commission. That vision of using thorium in place of uranium was set out in the 1950s by physicist Homi Bhabha.

==== Advanced Heavy Water Reactor ====
In February 2014, the Bhabha Atomic Research Centre (BARC), in Mumbai, India, presented their latest design for a "next-generation nuclear reactor" that burns thorium as its fuel ore, calling it the Advanced Heavy Water Reactor (AHWR). They estimated the reactor could function without an operator for 120 days. Validation of its core reactor physics was underway by late 2017. According to Ratan Kumar Sinha, chairman of the Atomic Energy Commission of India, "This will reduce our dependence on fossil fuels, mostly imported, and will be a major contribution to global efforts to combat climate change." Because of its inherent safety, they expect that similar designs could be set up "within" populated cities, like Mumbai or Delhi.

In 2013, India's 300 MWe AHWR (pressurized heavy water reactor) was slated to be built at an undisclosed location. The design envisages a start up with reactor grade plutonium that breeds U-233 from Th-232. Thereafter, thorium is to be the only fuel. As of 2017, the design was in the final stages of validation. However, as of 2026, no AHWR reactor has started construction.

=== Indonesia ===
In 2019, P3Tek, an agency of the Indonesia Ministry of Energy and Mineral Resource, reviewed a thorium molten salt reactor design by the US-based company Thorcon called the TMSR-500. (The TMSR-500 was later renamed the Thorcon 500.)

=== Israel ===
In May 2010, researchers from Ben-Gurion University of the Negev in Israel and Brookhaven National Laboratory in New York began to collaborate on the development of thorium-based reactors designed to have a breeding ratio of just over 1, a feature only possible for light water reactors if they use uranium-233 fuel.

=== Japan ===
In June 2012, Japan utility Chubu Electric Power wrote that they regard thorium as "one of future possible energy resources".

=== Norway ===
In 2010, Aker Solutions purchased patents from Nobel Prize winning physicist Carlo Rubbia for the design of a proton accelerator-based thorium nuclear power plant. In late 2012, Norway's privately owned Thor Energy, in collaboration with the government and Westinghouse, announced a four-year trial using thorium in an existing nuclear reactor.

=== South Africa ===
In South Africa, Steenkampskraal Thorium's planned 100 MW HTMR-100 NPP reactor is based on a variant of the Pebble bed modular reactor.

=== United Kingdom ===
In Britain, one organisation promoting or examining research on thorium-based nuclear plants is The Alvin Weinberg Foundation. House of Lords member Bryony Worthington is promoting thorium, calling it "the forgotten fuel" that could alter Britain's energy plans. However, in 2010, the UK's National Nuclear Laboratory (NNL) concluded that for the short to medium term, "...the thorium fuel cycle does not currently have a role to play," in that it is "technically immature, and would require a significant financial investment and risk without clear benefits", and concluded that the benefits have been "overstated". Friends of the Earth UK considers research into it as "useful" as a fallback option.

=== United States ===
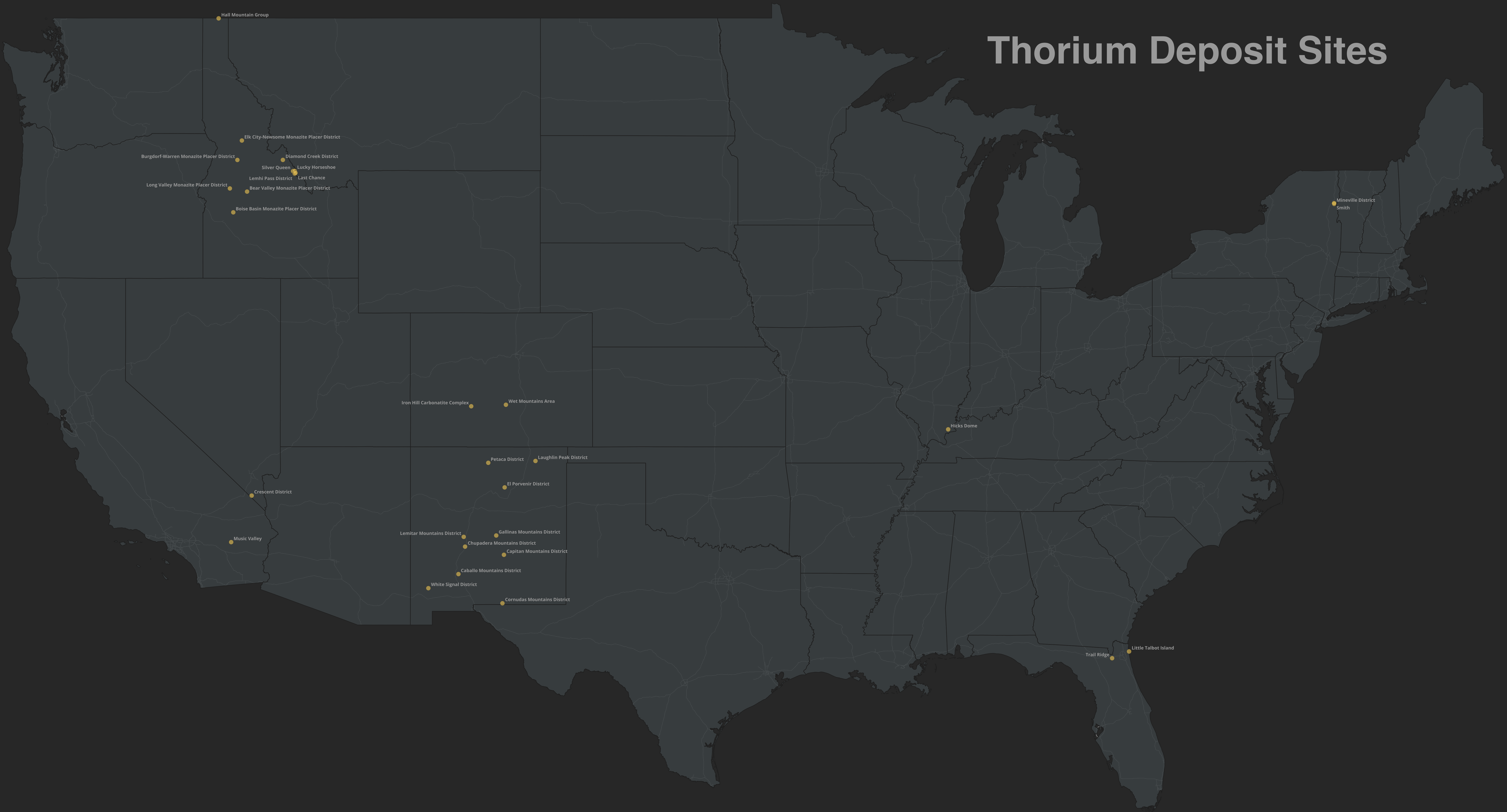
Thorium deposit sites in the US

In its January 2012 report to the United States Secretary of Energy, the Blue Ribbon Commission on America's Future notes that a "molten-salt reactor using thorium [has] also been proposed". That same month it was reported that the US Department of Energy is "quietly collaborating with China" on thorium-based nuclear power designs using an MSR.

Some experts and politicians want thorium to be "the pillar of the U.S. nuclear future". Then-Senators Harry Reid and Orrin Hatch supported using $250 million in federal research funds to revive ORNL research. In 2009, Congressman Joe Sestak unsuccessfully attempted to secure funding for research and development of a destroyer-sized reactor [reactor of a size to power a destroyer] using thorium-based liquid fuel.

Alvin Radkowsky, chief designer of the world's second full-scale atomic electric power plant in Shippingport, Pennsylvania, founded a joint US and Russian project in 1997 to create a thorium-based reactor, considered a "creative breakthrough". In 1992, while a resident professor in Tel Aviv, Israel, he founded the US company, Thorium Power Ltd., near Washington, D.C., to build thorium reactors.

The primary fuel of the proposed HT^{3}R research project near Odessa, Texas, United States, will be ceramic-coated thorium beads. The reactor construction has not yet begun. Estimates to complete a reactor were originally set at ten years in 2006 (with a proposed operational date of 2015).

On the research potential of thorium-based nuclear power, Richard L. Garwin, winner of the Presidential Medal of Freedom, and Georges Charpak advise further study of the Energy amplifier in their book Megawatts and Megatons (2001), pp. 153–63.

Clean Core Thorium Energy, a Chicago-based corporation created and patented a proprietary mixture of uranium and thorium for HALEU (High Assay Low Enriched Uranium). The fuel mixture is called ANEEL (Advanced Nuclear Energy for Enriched Life), in honor of Anil Kakodkar. HALEU has uranium that has been enriched to a level greater than 5% but less than 20% as per World Nuclear Association and needs cutting-edge nuclear reactor designs that are currently under development. But as per Mehul Shah, the founder and CEO of Clean Core Thorium Energy, operational CANDU reactors and its derivatives, such as IPHWR can accommodate ANEEL. According to Sean McDeavitt, professor in the Texas A&M University Department of Nuclear Engineering and Director of the Nuclear Engineering and Science Center, ANEEL is a first-of-its-kind nuclear fuel that blends thorium and HALEU in a proprietary, unique composition. To advance the creation and implementation of ANEEL, Canadian Nuclear Laboratories (CNL) and Clean Core inked a Memorandum of Understanding in April 2023. CNL agreed to support Clean Core's R&D and licensing efforts as part of the MoU.

== Thorium sources ==
World thorium reserves (2016)
Country	Tons	%
India	846,000	13.31%
Brazil	632,000	9.94%
Australia	595,000	9.36%
US	595,000	9.36%
Egypt	380,000	5.98%
Turkey	374,000	5.89%
Venezuela	300,000	4.72%
Canada	172,000	2.71%
Russia	155,000	2.44%
South Africa	148,000	2.33%
China	100,000	1.57%
Norway	87,000	1.37%
Greenland	86,000	1.35%
Finland	60,000	0.94%
Sweden	50,000	0.79%
Kazakhstan	50,000	0.79%
Other countries	1,725,000	27.14%
World Total	6,355,000	100.0%

Thorium is mostly found with the rare earth phosphate mineral, monazite, which contains up to about 12% thorium phosphate, but 6–7% on average. World monazite resources are estimated to be about 12 million tons, two-thirds of which are in heavy mineral sands deposits on the south and east coasts of India. There are substantial deposits in several other countries (see table "World thorium reserves"). Monazite is a good source of REEs (rare earth elements), but monazites are currently not economical to produce because the radioactive thorium that is produced as a byproduct would have to be stored indefinitely. However, if thorium-based power plants were adopted on a large-scale, virtually all the world's thorium requirements could be supplied simply by refining monazites for their more valuable REEs.

Another estimate of reasonably assured reserves (RAR) and estimated additional reserves (EAR) of thorium comes from OECD/NEA, Nuclear Energy, "Trends in Nuclear Fuel Cycle", Paris, France (2001). (see table "IAEA Estimates in tons")

IAEA Estimates in tons (2005)
Country	RAR Th	EAR Th
India	519,000	21%
Australia	489,000	19%
US	400,000	13%
Turkey	344,000	11%
Venezuela	302,000	10%
Brazil	302,000	10%
Norway	132,000	4%
Egypt	100,000	3%
Russia	75,000	2%
Greenland	54,000	2%
Canada	44,000	2%
South Africa	18,000	1%
Other countries	33,000	2%
World Total	2,810,000	100%

The preceding figures are reserves and as such refer to the amount of thorium in high-concentration deposits inventoried so far and estimated to be extractable at current market prices; millions of times more total exist in Earth's 3×10^{19} tonne crust, around 120 trillion tons of thorium, and lesser but vast quantities of thorium exist at intermediate concentrations. Proved reserves are a good indicator of the total future supply of a mineral resource.

== Fuel fabrication ==
In water-cooled reactors, the input fuel which needs to be utilized are not thorium, but rather mixed oxide fuels (MOX fuel) or thorium plutonium oxide fuels (TOX fuel); These fuels can be separated into three categories:

- (Th-LEU) MOX fuels contain uranium dioxide in high weight contents (10–30%).
- (Th-Pu) TOX fuels have low plutonium dioxide contents (2–8%)
- (Th-233U) MOX fuels have low uranium dioxide contents (2–5%)

Firstly, the individual dioxides which compose the fuel are powderized. These powders are then doped to limit radioactivity, as well as enhancing their sinterability. The varying powders are then mixed/milled together to form a homogenous powder, which is then compacted into the pellets to be used as fuel.

== Reactor types ==
According to the World Nuclear Association, seven types of reactors can use thorium fuel. Six have entered into service at some point:

- Heavy water reactors (PHWRs)
  - Aqueous homogeneous reactors (AHRs) have been proposed as a fluid fueled design that could accept naturally occurring uranium and thorium suspended in a heavy water solution. AHRs have been built and according to the IAEA reactor database, seven are currently in operation as research reactors.
- Boiling (light) water reactors (BWRs)
- Pressurized (light) water reactors (PWRs)
- Molten salt reactors (MSRs), including liquid fluoride thorium reactors (LFTRs).
  - Molten salt breeder reactors, or MSBRs, use thorium to breed more fissile material.
- High-temperature gas-cooled reactors (HTGRs)
- Fast neutron reactors (FNRs) – Nuclear reactor where fast neutrons maintain a fission chain reaction
- Accelerator driven reactors (ADS) – Type of nuclear reactor design

== See also ==
- Generation IV reactor – New nuclear reactor technologies under development
- India's three-stage nuclear power programme – India's nuclear energy programme envisioned by Homi J. Bhabha
- List of countries by thorium resources
- Nuclear power as renewable energy
