= TMSR =

TMSR, as an acronym, may refer to:

== Indian drama ==
- Tera Mera Saath Rahe, 2021 TV series
- Tera Mera Saath Rahen, 2001 film

== Music ==
- The Most Serene Republic, Canadian indie rock group

== Sports ==
- TMS Ringsted, Danish handball club

== Thorium molten salt reactor ==
- TMSR 500, prior designation of the ThorCon nuclear reactor
- TMSR (Chinese reactor project)
  - TMSR-LF1, active experimental reactor
