= TMSR (Chinese reactor project) =

Molten salt reactor program

Thorium Molten Salt Reactor Nuclear Energy System (TMSR)
- 钍基熔盐堆核能系统(TMSR)

- TMSR site (trefoil) in Gansu province (red), and Shanghai campus.【Notes】
- Country: China
- Key people: Xu Hongjie (徐洪杰)
- Launched: 2011; 15 years ago
- Website: http://www.sinap.cas.cn/zt/rydxcbd/
- Status: Active

TMSR (a shortened initialism of English Thorium Molten Salt Reactor Nuclear Energy System translated from Chinese: 钍基熔盐堆核能系统) is a long-term research and development project of the Chinese Academy of Sciences (CAS), begun in 2011 and assigned to its Shanghai Institute of Applied Physics (SINAP), to design, test, and build nuclear reactors that incorporate molten salt as a fuel-carrier and/or coolant, and thorium as a fertile material. The TMSR facilities grew from the collaborative efforts of "nearly 100 domestic research institutions, universities and industrial companies", and are now "the world's only research platform dedicated to molten salt reactors and thorium-uranium fuel cycle studies".

== Background ==
In 1970, Project 728 was launched to develop nuclear power in China to mitigate an energy crisis caused by industrial fossil fuel demand exceeding domestic supply. Its initial goal was to build a 25 MW_{e} power plant based on the 1960s Molten-Salt Reactor Experiment (MSRE) at Oak Ridge National Laboratory (ORNL) in the US. A demonstration molten salt reactor (MSR) was built that achieved criticality in 1971, but the zero‐power MSR was not intended to produce power. In 1972, however, priority was changed to pressurized water reactor (PWRs) instead. The new goal became a 300 MW_{e} reactor at Qinshan Nuclear Power Plant. A zero‐power Light-water reactor (LWR) was built, which was completed in 1973.^{p.9} Their first commercial reactor, CNP-300, began operations in 1991.

=== Thorium occurrence in China ===
Due to relatively limited domestic Uranium deposits, China's nuclear power production relies heavily on imported uranium. In the 1970s, global Thorium reserves were estimated to be on the order of 1 Mt, and China was not considered to have especially rich deposits. In the 1980s, the rare-earth industry in China began in earnest; rare earths are required for numerous high-tech devices which China manufactures. By the early 1990s, China was producing a majority of the world's rare earths, and by the end of the decade had achieved a near-monopoly. As a byproduct of its mining and refining, it was also generating Thorium far in excess of any non-nuclear needs. By 2009 it was noted that Thorium was being stockpiled in China for future nuclear use.

== TMSR project launched ==
In January 2011, CAS began the TMSR research and development project to create reactors which, among other advances, would use air cooling. Its initial budget was reportedly ¥3 billion (US$444 million then-equivalent; approximately $635 million as of 2025). and was led by Xu Hongjie through SINAP, which established MSR research facilities in Shanghai's Jiading District.

In March 2012, SINAP presented an overview of the project. In 2012 a thorium energy conference was held in Shanghai, in partnership with SINAP; speakers included Xu Hongie, and Jiang Mianheng. For the conference, The First Nuclear Era: The Life and Times of a Technological Fixer, the autobiography of Alvin M. Weinberg, who headed ORNL during the MSRE, was translated into Chinese, and copies made available to attendees.

By 2014 the smog in China from burning coal had worsened (note e.g. 2013 Northeastern China smog and 2013 Eastern China smog) to a point where TMSR engineers were told to accelerate their efforts to bring a reactor online from 25 years to 10.

In 2015, SINAP signed a decade-long Cooperative Research and Development Agreement (CRADA) with ORNL for technology transfer related to the MSRE and associated nuclear innovations.

By 2019, the Bayan Obo Mining District was recognized as a major Thorium deposit, with China holding at least 0.1 Mt Recent exploration at Bayan Obo has identified additional, massive Thorium deposits: 220,000 tons proven as of 2025, with total reserves estimated in excess of 1 million tons. The total for all of China is now thought to be 1.4 Mt. By some estimates, this is enough to power China for 60,000 years.

== TMSR-SF0 ==
In 2019, the construction of a solid fuel simulator, the TMSR-SF0, was completed in Shanghai, with operation starting in February 2020. It is an electrically heated (non-fissioning) simulator to aid development of a proposed "SF" (solid fuel, planned as TRISO, with molten salt only for cooling), as well as to gain operational experience using molten salt more generally. The SF0 has two liquid FLiNaK heat transport loops. The SF0 was built as a TMSR-SF1 simulate reactor on one-third scale.

== TMSR-SF1 ==
In 2017, the design of a 10 MW_{th} solid fuel test reactor was presented. A was lifetime of 20 year was envisaged.^{p.15-21} The project was however prematurely terminated.

== LF1 ==
Gansu TMSR site timelapse (2018–2025) from Sentinel-2 satellite imagery; LF1 building near top.

TMSR-LF1 (Chinese: 液态燃料钍基熔盐实验堆 lit.: "liquid fuel thorium-based molten salt experimental reactor") is a 2 MW_{t} MSR prototype operating in northwest China. The "LF" (liquid fuel) design is directly based on the 1960s MSRE. The site selected for the TMSR-LF1 is part of an industrial park for the chemical and energy sectors, in a sparsely populated, arid region (see Location notes section below).

Originally, a 2 MW TMSR-LF was planned for 2017, but in 2022, this appeared to have been changed to 2020. Site construction began in 2018. Installation of equipment was finished in 2022. Criticality was first achieved on 11 October 2023. On 17 June 2024, full power (2MW_{t}) was achieved. In October 2024, it operated at full power for 10 days with thorium fuel. Protactinium-233 was detected, indicating successful nuclear breeding. In November 2025, the research team announced to have achieved the conversion of thorium-232 into fissile uranium-233.

SINAP deputy director Cai Xiangzhou emphasized China's ability to produce the technology without the involvement of foreign entities, stating that "Over 90 percent of the [LF1's] reactor's components are domestically produced, with 100 percent localization of key parts and a fully independent supply chain. This achievement marks the initial establishment of an industrial ecosystem for thorium molten salt reactor technologies in China". SINAP's director, Dai Zhimin, stated that SINAP will work with energy companies, including the State Power Investment Corporation, "to build a comprehensive industrial and supply chain ecosystem for the thorium molten salt reactors."

== Future plans ==
=== TMSR-LF2 ===
A pilot plant based on the LF1, as well as a fuel salt research facility, is planned for the same site. New reactor specifications include: core graphite 3 m tall x 2.2 m wide, 700 °C operating temperature, 60 MW thermal output, and an experimental supercritical carbon dioxide-based closed-cycle gas turbine to convert the thermal output to 10 MW of electricity. In 2022, the target date for a 10 MW version was around 2020 and for a demonstrator version 2035.

A report compiled by the Chinese credit rating agency CSCI Pengyuan confirmed that site construction for the 60 MW_{t} reactor (listed as "TMSR-LF2") began in September 2025, and is expected to last 48 months. Criticality, and full power operation, are expected in 2030.

=== TMSR-SF2 ===
A prototype of a 100 MW pebble bed solid fuel reactor was planned for 2024, and for full deployment by 2035. In 2013, Xu Hongjie, director of the Chinese Academy of Sciences (CAS), said he expected to complete a 2-megawatt pilot for the solid fuel version by around 2015, and a 100-MW demonstrator model of the same by 2024, a small modular version by 2035 and a 1-gigawatt version around 2040.

=== Other TMSR projects ===
In 2021, a design for a commercial nuclear reactor "expected to be the first in the world that does not need water for cooling" was unveiled. Construction work was said to be completed by 2030.

In 2022, a design for a 400 MW_{th} (168 MW_{e}) small modular reactor (SMR) was published. The proposed Thorium Molten Salt Demonstration Reactor was referred to as 'smTMSR-400'.

In July 2024, the South China Morning Post wrote that China planned to start building in 2025 in the Gobi Desert "the world’s first molten salt reactor power station". It would be a 60 MW_{th} SMR, including a 10 MW electric power unit, and the rest of the thermal energy for producing hydrogen. It was scheduled to be completed and operational in 2029.

In January 2026, National Science Review wrote that a 100 MW_{e} demonstration project was planned by 2035 and full commercialization of TMSR technology was expected by 2040.

== TMSR-based projects ==
=== Vessels ===
In 2023, Jiangnan Shipyard released a conceptual design for a container ship using a TMSR-based reactor, designated KUN-24AP. Jiangnan Shipyard Group Vice President Lin Qingshan stated in 2025 that it was planning to invest in shipyards for vessels employing nuclear marine propulsion, beginning with the aforementioned container ship. The ship's construction was planned to start in 2035, and feature a 200 MW reactor, cargo capacity of 25 thousand intermodal containers, and 40-year lifespan. Hu Keyi, a senior engineer at Jiangnan, stated that the reactor would power the vessel electrically, generating approximately 50 MW_{e}. A 10 MW backup diesel generator would also be included in the design. The TMSR unit would be "built as a sealed modular unit with a 10-year lifespan. Instead of refuelling it, the whole unit will be replaced after a decade, reducing the risk of leaks or human errors during maintenance."

=== In space ===
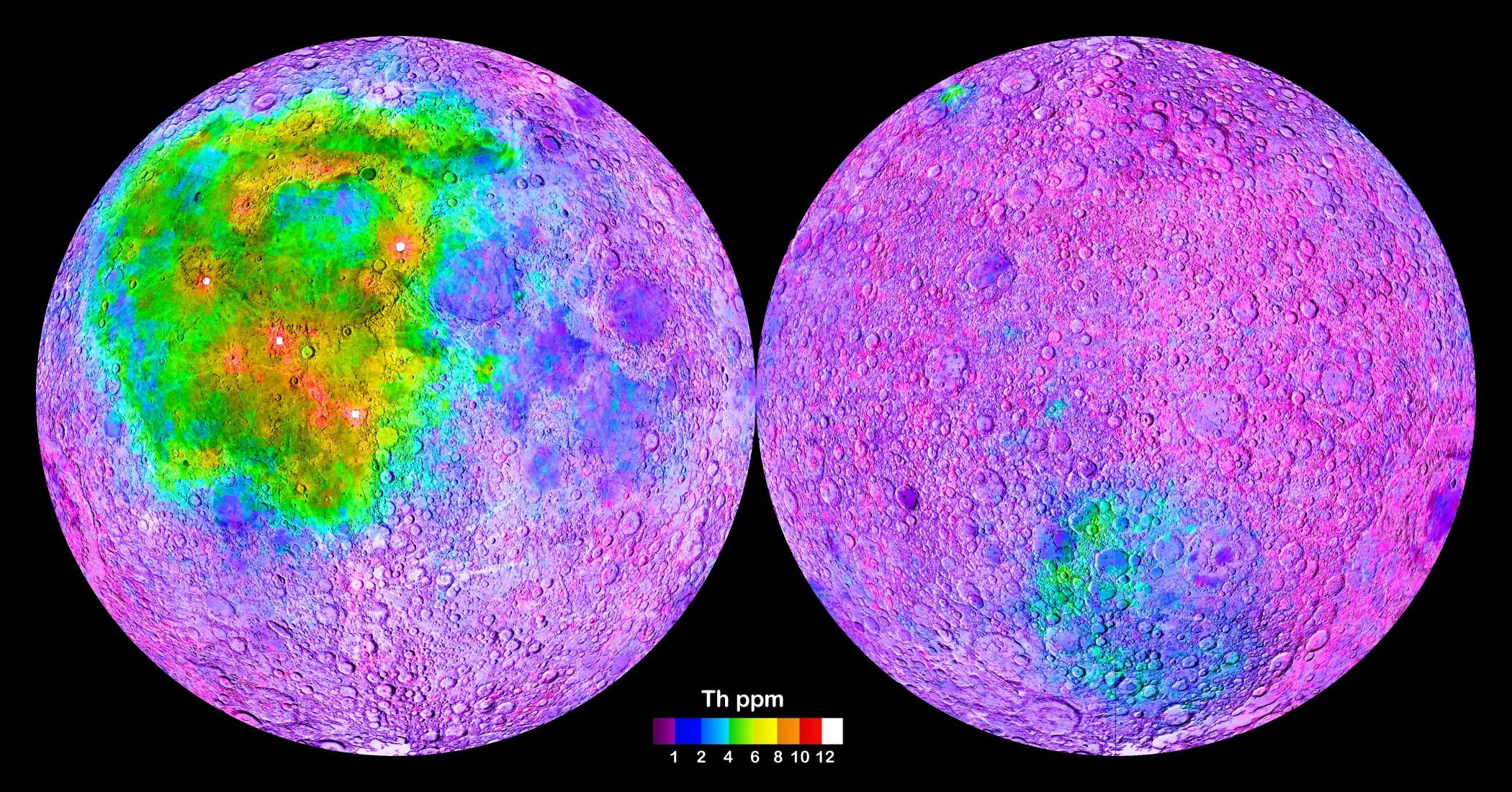
Thorium concentrations on the Moon, as mapped by Lunar Prospector.

The 2025 CSCI Pengyuan report additionally listed two further potential applications for TMSR technology: a bulk (thousands of kg per year) tritium source for ITER-scale nuclear fusion projects, and "Deep Space and Planetary Surface Energy": 1 MW_{e} nuclear power in space that also generates process heat above 700 C. For a mission to the Moon, the salt used would be made there from lunar regolith; harvested lunar water would be split using the sulfur–iodine cycle, generating hydrogen and oxygen to be used as rocket propellant for a return trip.

== Location notes ==
TMSR site (trefoil) in Minqin county (orange) is roughly 120 km (75 miles) north of Wuwei city (circled star)

The most recently published official Gansu site plan map is Figure 2.1-2 in

The LF1 reactor is sited within an industrial park located in Hongshagang (town), Minqin (county), Wuwei (prefecture), Gansu (province), China. The area is a semi-desert just south of the Badain Jaran section of the Gobi. As per official documentation, the TMSR-LF1 site is located at 38°57′31″ N, 102°36′55″ E. However, due to the China GPS shift problem, the reactor location using Western GPS coordinates is approximately 38.9602°N 102.6122°E (about a third of a kilometer offset).

The LF2 reactor building is planned for approximately 38.9593°N 102.6101°E (Western coordinates).
