= Milton Shaw =

American nuclear engineer (1921–2001)

- Born: October 5, 1921; Knoxville, Tennessee, US
- Died: November 24, 2001 (aged 80); Chevy Chase, Maryland, US
- Education: University of Tennessee, Knoxville (BS); Pennsylvania State College (MSc); Oak Ridge School of Reactor Technology
- Employers: US Navy; US Atomic Energy Commission
- Known for: USS Nautilus; USS Enterprise (CVN-65)
- Spouse: Natalie Bisgyer Shaw (m. 1951)
- Children: 3
- Military service
- Allegiance: United States
- Branch: United States Navy
- Service years: 1944–1945
- Rank: Lieutenant
- Conflicts: World War II

Milton Shaw (October 5, 1921 – November 24, 2001) was an American nuclear engineer who served as director of the Division of Reactor Development and Technology at the US Atomic Energy Commission from 1964 to 1973. He served in the US Navy during World War II before transitioning to the Naval Reactors program. Considered a protégé of Hyman Rickover, Shaw oversaw the construction of the USS Nautilus and USS Enterprise. During his tenure at the AEC, he is credited with the obstruction of many reactor safety-related programs; and was instrumental in the termination of the Molten Salt Reactor Experiment.

== Biography ==
=== Early life ===
Milton Shaw was born in Knoxville, Tennessee, on October 5, 1921. He had two sisters, Ruth and Genevieve. His father, William Shaw, was a professor of agricultural chemistry at the University of Tennessee. According to his family members, he wanted to work on a submarine since reading Twenty Thousand Leagues Under the Seas at age 11.

Shaw studied mechanical engineering at the University of Tennessee, Knoxville, graduating with a Bachelor of Science degree in 1944. He joined the Navy later that year, where he was sent to the Navy Propulsion School at Cornell University. At the rank of Lieutenant, he served as the commanding officer of the USS Manayunk (AN-81), operating off Saipan until 1946. Following the end of the war, he worked at the Naval Engineering Experiment Station and Testing Laboratory (EES) in Annapolis. He later received a Master's degree in mechanical engineering from Pennsylvania State College.

=== Career ===
At some point while in the Navy, Shaw encountered Hyman Rickover, the head of the Naval Reactors program. Shaw joined the program in June 1950 and was sent to the Oak Ridge School of Reactor Technology at Oak Ridge National Laboratory, founded by Rickover and research director Alvin Weinberg. He studied under Weinberg until 1951, at which point he began work with Rickover. Shaw became Rickover's designer of surface-ship propulsion systems. During his time with Naval Reactors, he was the project manager for the development of the USS Nautilus, launched in 1954, the first nuclear submarine, and the USS Enterprise, the first nuclear-powered aircraft carrier, launched in 1960. After leaving the Naval Reactors Bureau in 1961, Shaw worked for the Secretary of the Navy as Senior Technical Assistant for Research and Development.

In 1964, Shaw left the Navy to join the Atomic Energy Commission as the director of the Division of Reactor Development and Technology. In this role, he was responsible for overseeing all reactor research and development. Several reactor safety research programs were underway at the AEC. Among these was the Molten Salt Breeder Reactor (MSBR) program, which culminated in the Molten Salt Reactor Experiment (MSRE) at Oak Ridge. At the time, interest in extending the supply of nuclear fuel led to substantial research into breeder reactors. The competing designs included the MSBR and Liquid Metal Fast Breeder Reactor. Shaw, with his Naval Reactors background, moved to stamp out research into reactor safety, and towards what he saw were the two proven reactor designs: the light-water reactor and the LMFBR. In particular, in spite of the project's apparent successes, Shaw was directly responsible for the cancellation of the MSRE, and is credited with Weinberg's ouster from ORNL. Shaw instead focused the AEC's resources into the development of LMFBRs, under the rationale that the technology was more mature than the MSBR. This would eventually lead to the failed Clinch River Breeder Reactor Project. Shaw was also accused of funneling money meant for LWR development to support the LMFBR.

In 1973, with considerable criticism mounting of the AEC's regulatory programs, the Nixon administration installed Dixy Lee Ray as chair. She quickly moved to separate the reactor development and regulation segments of the agency, prompting Shaw to resign in protest.

Shaw later worked as an energy consultant, and taught as a visiting professor at Carnegie Mellon University and MIT. He also gave numerous interviews to journalists about nuclear technology.

== Personal life ==
In 1951, Shaw married Natalie Bisgyer Shaw. The couple had three children: Eric Shaw, Andrea Shaw Reed, and Daniel Shaw. They had eight grandchildren.

Shaw was born into a Jewish family, and was a member of Temple Sinai in Chevy Chase until his death.

On November 24, 2001, Shaw died of pancreatic cancer at his home in Chevy Chase.

== Legacy ==
At the time of his resignation, Shaw was criticized by several environmental groups, who alleged he had neglected safety questions in favor of reactor development programs. Even beforehand, it was believed that he had essentially sabotaged the AEC's reactor safety programs for the sake of developing the LMFBR.

During the 21st century, many in the nuclear industry have criticized Shaw's actions, particularly in cutting funding for the MSBR program and for safety programs. Several writers have credited his actions with effectively killing off research into molten salt reactors in the United States until the 21st century, and with contributing to the breakup of the AEC and formation of the Department of Energy and Nuclear Regulatory Commission. While US research into the thorium fuel cycle continued after Shaw's departure, particularly at Fort St. Vrain and the Shippingport LWBR, several writers have argued Shaw's actions played a substantial role in preventing the adoption of thorium-based nuclear power in the United States.

== Honors and awards ==
- Navy Distinguished Civilian Service Award (1959, 1964)
- National Civil Service Award (1968)
- Atomic Energy Commission Distinguished Service Award (1972)

== See also ==
- Nuclear power in the United States
