= TRISO fuel =

Type of nuclear fuel

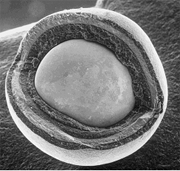
A 0.845 mm TRISO fuel particle which has been cracked, showing the multiple layers surrounding the spherical kernel

Tri-structural isotropic (TRISO) fuel is a form of micro-particle nuclear fuel. Each particle consists of a spherical kernel of uranium dioxide (UO_{2}) or other ceramic fuel, coated with four additional ceramic layers through chemical vapor deposition. TRISO fuel particles are designed not to crack from thermal or mechanical stresses at temperatures below 1600 °C, and therefore can contain radioactive fission products even during severe accidents.

Uniform spherical fuel kernels are created through the sol–gel process. Each particle is then coated in a buffer layer made of porous carbon that absorbs fission product recoils, a dense inner layer of protective pyrolytic carbon (PyC), a strong ceramic layer of silicon carbide (SiC) to retain fission products at elevated temperatures and to give the TRISO particle more structural integrity, and a dense outer layer of PyC. The finished TRISO particles are then embedded into a graphite matrix to form spherical or cylindrical fuel elements.

Historically, TRISO has been used in high-temperature gas-cooled reactors (HTGRs), both prismatic-block and pebble-bed. The first reactor to use TRISO was the Dragon reactor, while the first commercial station was the Fort Saint Vrain Nuclear Power Plant. As of 2026, TRISO fuel compacts are used in some experimental reactors, such as HTR-10 in China and HTTR in Japan, as well as commercially in the 100 MW_{e} HTR-PM pebble-bed HTGR.

== Characteristics ==
=== Composition ===
Each TRISO fuel particle is composed of a spherical kernel of ceramic nuclear fuel, coated with additional ceramic layers. These layers preserve the kernel's structural integrity, and prevent release of fission products. TRISO has excellent high-temperature integrity, and excellent fission product retention. Modern TRISO particle fuels are designed not to crack at temperatures below 1600 °C.

Fuel kernels for TRISO particles can utilize various fissile and fertile materials, including uranium, plutonium, and thorium. Early HTGRs used a mixture of highly enriched uranium (HEU) and thorium carbides or oxides for their fuel kernels. For operational and economic reasons, modern HTGRs typically use low-enriched uranium (LEU) oxide or oxycarbide. The most widely used reference fuel for pebble-bed reactors is uranium dioxide (UO_{2}). In the 1970s, uranium carbide (UC_{2}) was used in TRISO particles, however UC_{2} increases attack of the SiC layer by rare-earth fission products. This fuel type is improved by mixing uranium carbides with oxides, called uranium oxycarbide (UCO). UCO is capable of retaining fission products similar to UO_{2}, but also reduces interior carbon monoxide gas pressure. In the United States, the Next Generation Nuclear Plant (NGNP) project selected UCO particles for prismatic fuel elements because they can achieve high burnup, exceeding 20% FIMA. Due to a lack of irradiation data, UCO kernels were tested for NGNP during the US Advanced Gas Reactor Fuel Development and Qualification (AGR) Program beginning in 2002.

Modern TRISO particles are typically 0.8–1.0 mm in diameter, each containing a spherical 350–500 μm kernel composed of UO_{2} or UCO. The kernel is coated with four isotropic ceramic layers:

1. A "buffer" layer of porous (~50 vol%) pyrolytic carbon, which absorbs kernel swelling and fission product recoil.
2. A dense inner pyrolytic carbon (IPyC) layer, which helps retain fission gases.
3. A dense layer of silicon carbide (SiC), which gives the particle is strong structural integrity and blocks fission product diffusion.
4. A dense outer pyrolytic carbon (OPyC) layer, which protects the SiC layer during fuel fabrication and provides a good bond surface for the graphite matrix. It also imparts compressive stress on the SiC layer, countering the pressure from fission gases that build up inside the particle.

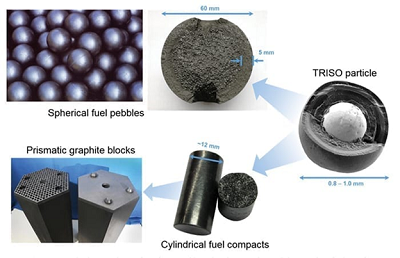
TRISO fuel particles can be formed into spherical or prismatic fuel elements

After fabrication, the particles are embedded into a graphite or SiC matrix to form fuel elements. The fuel elements for HTGRs consist of billions of TRISO particles dispersed in a graphite matrix. Elements take the form of a cylinder, called a "compact", or a sphere, called a "pebble". Cylindrical fuel compacts are used in prismatic-block designs, while pebbles are used in pebble-bed reactor designs. Each compact is typically 12.5 mm in diameter and 25–50 mm in length; pebbles are typically around 6 cm in diameter.

TRISO fuel quality has been gradually optimized since it was introduced. In Germany, improved process control has led to industrial-scale production of high-quality TRISO particles, with defect rates of around 100 failures per 3.3 million fuel particles. The excellent performance of German TRISO formed the basis for current fuel quality standards, which typically require fewer than 1 in 10,000 particles to fail during accident conditions.

=== Failure mechanisms ===
Although highly robust overall, TRISO fuel is subject to several diverse failure mechanisms. Further decreasing the failure rate of TRISO particles is the subject of continuing research.

The coating can fail as a pressure vessel. During operation, gaseous fission products are released from the fuel kernel, and increase the pressure inside the particle. The pressure causes mechanical stress to build up within the TRISO coating. Should this stress exceed the strength of the coating, the particle will fail and can release fission products. The ability of the TRISO coating to retain pressure also changes as a result of heat and irradiation.

At temperatures exceeding 2,100 °C (3,810 °F), the SiC layer will decompose and the particle will fail. SiC failure can also be caused by palladium, a fission product, which diffuses through the inner PyC layer and reacts with SiC. This reaction thins and weakens the SiC layer.

For fuel kernels containing oxygen, such as UO_{2}, liberated oxygen will react with structural carbon to form CO. Oxygen therefore eats away at the buffer and inner PyC layers, and can cause mechanical rupture.

Further damage is caused by migration of carbon within the coating. CO and CO_{2} gases are converted into each other by reacting with solid carbon:

CO_{2} + C ⇌ 2CO

The formation of CO is more favorable at high temperature; a temperature gradient through the fuel particle will drive more CO_{2} gas to the hot side and further erode the pyrocarbon layers. The net result is that carbon is eaten away on the hot side of the kernel, and builds up on the cold side. The kernel eventually touches the SiC layer. Visually, the kernel appears to move towards the SiC layer, so this effect is commonly termed "kernel migration", although this is not exactly accurate. It is also called the "amoeba effect", and will eventually cause failure of the SiC layer. To prevent kernel migration, uranium oxycarbide fuel contains a mixture of UO_{2} and UC_{2} (such as a 3:1 ratio). The carbide fuel acts as a sink for the free oxygen, which converts it into UO_{2} and solid carbon. This reduces both interior pressure and kernel migration.

== Production ==
To produce TRISO fuel, the fuel material is dissolved and formed into uniform gel spheres that are then dried and sintered to create the fuel kernels. The kernels are then coated with ceramic materials, overcoated with a graphite-resin matrix, then heated and pressed into fuel elements. Because the process is easy to perform remotely, TRISO fuel is also well-suited to the thorium fuel cycle, which requires remote fabrication of recycled fuel.

Uniform spherical fuel kernels for TRISO fuel are most commonly produced using a version of the sol–gel process developed at Oak Ridge National Laboratory. First, an actinide or actinide mixture (such as Th/U) is dissolved in nitric acid to form a precursor solution ("sol"), such as uranyl nitrate. Next, ammonium ions are added to the solution to begin gelation. The sol is then sprayed through a vibrating nozzle into a heated organic liquid, where the surface tension forms tiny gel spheres. The gel spheres, containing actinide oxide precipitates such as UO_{2} or ThO_{2}, are aged in the liquid until the gelation reaction completes. To form UCO from UO_{2}, carbon is dispersed through the gel to promote formation of UC_{2}. The gel spheres are washed with ammonium hydroxide and dried to remove residual water. Finally, the dried spheres are subjected to thermochemical processing and sintering to form the ceramic fuel kernels. Defective kernels of nonuniform shape are removed by sieving.

Each kernel is then coated in four successive coatings via fluidized-bed chemical vapor deposition. Hydrocarbon gases are used to create the PyC coatings, typically acetylene for the buffer layer and a mixture of acetylene and propylene for the IPyC and OPyC layers. The SiC layer is deposited using a mixture of methyltrichlorosilane and H_{2}.

Finally, the finished TRISO particles are pressed into fuel elements, either prismatic compacts or spherical pebbles. In both cases, the particles are coated with a blend of graphite and a thermosetting resin, pressed into the desired shape, and heated to carbonize the resin and form the final fuel element.

== History ==
=== Early development ===
Coated-particle ceramic fuels were initially developed in the United Kingdom as part of the Dragon reactor project. During the development of the Dragon reactor, its designers became concerned by the need to purge gaseous fission products from the reactor core and their potential migration to other parts of the reactor. This concern led to the choice of coated-particle fuel, where the fuel would be formed from small particles of uranium then coated with pyrolytic carbon. The inclusion of silicon carbide as a diffusion barrier was first suggested by D. T. Livey in 1961, in order to better retain fission products.

Work on coated-particle fuels also took place at the same time in the United States. Peach Bottom Unit 1, a 40 MW_{e} demonstration HTGR, used prismatic coated-particle fuel consisting of highly enriched uranium (HEU) carbide mixed with thorium carbide and coated in a single layer of pyrolytic carbon in its first core. Peach Bottom also contained test elements for more advanced fuels, including TRISO. Due to fracturing of the pyrolytic carbon layer, a low-density porous carbon buffer layer was added before the dense PyC layer to absorb fission product recoils and accommodate fission gas swelling. This new design was used in the reactor's second core, and the two-layer particle design was called buffer-isotropic or bistructural-isotropic (BISO) fuel. In Germany, the experimental AVR reactor used ThO_{2}-^{235}UO_{2} BISO, in a spherical pebble form rather than as prismatic blocks. This was replaced with TRISO in the late 1970s. The later commercial THTR-300 reactor used similar oxide BISO fuel pebbles as AVR, and ran from 1983 to 1988.

Fuel elements at Fort St. Vrain comprised cylindrical TRISO compacts, loaded into hexagonal graphite blocks

The first commercial HTGR, and the first commercial reactor to use TRISO, was the 330 MW_{e} Fort Saint Vrain Nuclear Power Plant designed by General Atomics. It used prismatic-block ThC_{2}-^{235}UC_{2} fuel similar to Peach Bottom, along with fertile ThC_{2} elements in preparation for a thorium fuel cycle using Th-^{233}U. This fuel used a full four-layer TRISO coating, and the fuel elements performed better than its designers anticipated. However, the plant suffered serious issues with its mechanical components, notably its helium circulators, and achieved an availability of only 14.6%. The experience in the US program with carbide fuel led to the transition to a mixture of 80%-UO_{2}, 20%-UC_{2}, known as uranium oxycarbide (UCO), due to its superior fission product retention compared to pure uranium carbide. General Atomics sold six additional HTGRs by the mid 1970s, but all were cancelled due to poor economic conditions. One cancelled plant, the two-unit Fulton Station in Pennsylvania, would have used TRISO-coated HEU-Th driver fuel with thorium BISO fertile fuel.

The experimental High Temperature Test Reactor in Japan, constructed in 1998, uses prismatic UO_{2} TRISO fuel. Tsinghua University constructed a 10 MW_{th} prototype pebble-bed HTGR, the HTR-10, in 2000. It used UO_{2} TRISO pebbles containing low-enriched uranium. TRISO was also proposed for use in the Very High Temperature Reactor (VHTR), a class of HTGR aiming to reach very high temperatures, approaching 1,000 °C (1,830 °F), usable for process heat. The VHTR was selected as one of the six concepts under the Generation IV Initiative.

=== Renewed interest ===
There has been a resurgence of interest in using TRISO for high-temperature reactors, including HTGRs and FHRs; as accident tolerant fuel for existing light-water reactors; and for space nuclear power. In China, the HTR-10 was used as a prototype for the larger 100 MW_{e} HTR-PM reactors at Shidao Bay, which came online in December 2021. As of 2025, the only commercial-scale producer of TRISO was China National Nuclear Corporation. Most European small modular reactor (SMR) companies have avoided TRISO fuel due to geopolitical concerns.

The US Department of Energy conducted a series of experiments, the Advanced Gas Reactor Fuel Qualification Program (AGR), to improve the quality of TRISO fuel. X-energy, an American SMR developer, developed a proprietary blend of TRISO based on the AGR program called TRISO-X. The company received an $80 million grant in 2020 under the DOE's Advanced Reactor Demonstration Program to construct a four-unit power plant along with a commercial-scale TRISO-X fabrication facility. X-energy's Xe-100 pebble-bed HTGR plans to use spherical pebbles containing TRISO particles containing UCO. Several other SMR developers have proposed reactors using TRISO fuel.

TRISO-fueled microreactors have also attracted interest in the US for powering military installations. The Department of Defense contracted BWX Technologies to develop Project Pele, a transportable HTGR which began construction in 2024. Similarly, the Air Force's Advanced Nuclear Power for Installations (ANPI) program selected three microreactor developers to build transportable microreactors to power military bases in the US. The three developers, Westinghouse, Antares Nuclear, and Radiant Industries, all have proposed designs using TRISO fuel.

== Applications ==
=== High-temperature reactors ===
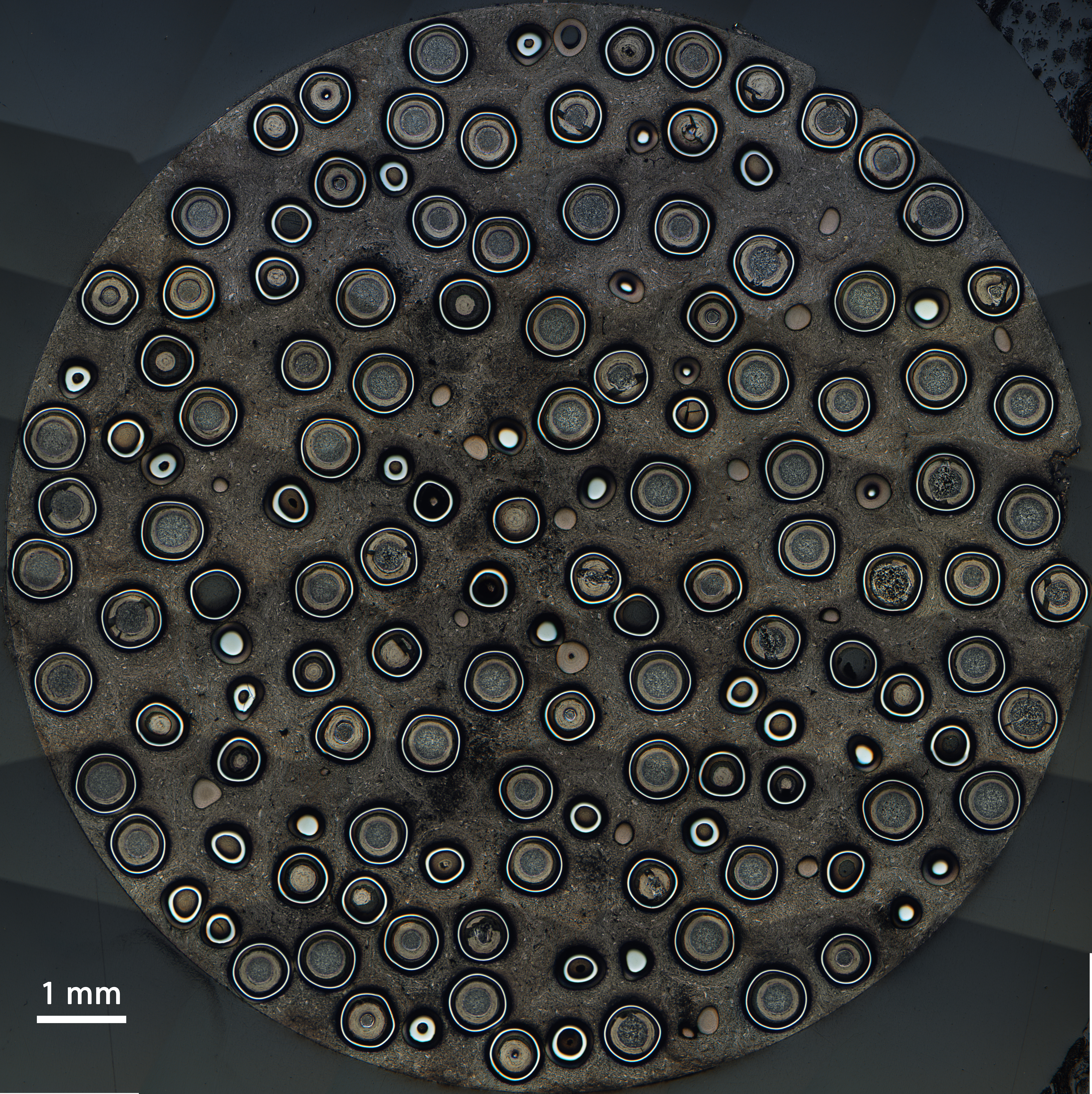
A cross-section of an HTGR fuel compact, showing the dispersed TRISO particles

High-temperature gas-cooled reactors have a high coolant outlet temperature, up to around 1000 °C. Such high temperatures require fuel elements entirely composed of ceramics. TRISO and other coated-particle fuels are the standard fuel form for HTGRs worldwide. The fluoride salt-cooled high-temperature reactor (FHR) design also uses TRISO fuel similar to HTGRs, but uses a molten salt coolant instead of inert gas.

Kairos Power developed a pebble-bed FHR, KP-FHR, based on the PB-FHR design from the University of California, Berkeley. As of 2026, Kairos is constructing the Hermes reactor, a 35 MW_{th} test reactor, and Hermes 2, a demonstration plant supplying a total of 50 MW_{e} to the Tennessee Valley Authority grid. The company also signed an agreement with Google to deploy 500 MW of KP-FHR reactors by 2035. Another pebble-bed FHR design, TMSR-SF, is under development by the Shanghai Institute of Applied Physics under its TMSR project. TMSR-SF utilizes TRISO-coated HALEU fuel, and is optimized to provide process heat for industrial applications.

=== Accident tolerant fuel ===
Accident tolerant fuels (ATF) are advanced fuel designs for existing light-water reactors currently in operation, that can withstand a loss-of-coolant accident better than current fuels. Research on ATF accelerated significantly following the Fukushima Daichii nuclear accident in 2011. One ATF concept is fully ceramic microencapsulated fuel (FCM), which comprises TRISO particles dispersed in a matrix with high thermal conductivity such as silicon carbide. FCM fuel pellets would then be sealed in a cladding tube for use in a pressurized water reactor. FCM has excellent fission product retention, thermal properties, and chemical compatability.

== List of TRISO-fueled reactors ==
The following reactors used TRISO or its predecessors as driver fuel (rather than as test elements).

Name	Country	Thermal power (MW)	Electric power (MW)	Year of commission	Year of decommission	Notes
Dragon	United Kingdom	20		1964	1976	Prismatic, HEU TRISO
Peach Bottom 1	United States	115	40	1966	1974	Prismatic, (Th,HEU)C_{2} PyC-coated (Core 1), BISO (Core 2)
AVR	Germany	46	15	1967	1988	Pebble-bed, (Th,U)O_{2} BISO
Fort St. Vrain	United States	842	330	1976	1989	Prismatic, (Th,U)C_{2} TRISO driver fuel, ThC_{2} TRISO fertile fuel
THTR-300	Germany	750	300	1983	1988	Pebble-bed, (Th,U)O_{2} BISO
HTTR	Japan	30		2000	Operational	Prismatic, LEU UO_{2} TRISO
HTR-10	China	10		2000	Operational	Pebble-bed, LEU UO_{2} TRISO
HTR-PM	China	2 × 250	210	2023	Operational	Pebble-bed, LEU UO_{2} TRISO
Hermes	United States	35		Under construction		Pebble-bed FHR, HALEU UCO TRISO
Hermes 2	United States		50	Under construction		Pebble-bed FHR, HALEU UCO TRISO

== See also ==
- Power Reactor Demonstration Program
- Thorium-based nuclear power
