= HT3R =

The High-Temperature Teaching & Test Reactor (HT^{3}R or HT3R) is a multifaceted energy research facility proposed by the University of Texas of the Permian Basin (UTPB) and the Los Alamos National Laboratory (LANL), to be located in Andrews County, Texas. The proposal envisions a 25MWt (Megawatt thermal) reactor operated by a merchant nuclear power operating company with the education and science at the facility managed through an arrangement between LANL and UTPB/UTS (University of Texas System).

The original Pre-Conceptual Design (PCD) for the facility was completed in January 2008 by UTPB and General Atomics. The HT^{3}R, per the PCD, is a "Generation IV" (GEN-IV) gas-cooled (with Helium) reactor with a graphite block core containing fuel "compacts." These compacts are made by mixing graphite with TRISO fuel pellets with Low Enriched Uranium (LEU) which has less than 20% of Uranium-235. However, the "new" planned operating temperature of 700° to 750 °C is well below the previous PCD operating temperature of 850° to 900 °C first called for by the DOE's NGNP program.

The HT^{3}R will be the experimental cornerstone of a new energy research center at the UTPB. Since the early 1990s, no new university teaching and training reactors have been constructed, and in fact, many across the United States have been shut down. Further, only two other aging water-cooled research reactors, one at the University of Missouri (1966) and one at the National Institute of Standards and Technology (1967), are capable of operating at power levels greater than 10 MWt that can provide useful facilities for fuel qualification, training, and basic advanced research. Neither of these reactors can provide the enhanced capabilities necessary for education, research, and pilot-scale testing for Gen-IV reactor systems.

The mission of the HT^{3}R is to serve as a national user facility for:

- Demonstrating that a Green Freedom^{TH} pilot plant can be used to manufacture synthetic hydrocarbon fuels, in sufficient quantities per kWhr, at remote sites around the world for military and civilian applications.
- Performing research and testing to qualify the TRISO LEU fuel for GEN-IV reactors in the US.
- Exploring the use of proliferation-resistant fuels in the US, including thorium-based and other advanced fuel cycle concepts.
- Performing basic and applied research using the enhanced capabilities offered by a "Generation IV" type nuclear reactor system.
- Facilitating the education and training of the next generation of nuclear scientists and engineers.

This joint effort uses the scientific and technical resources of New Mexico and Texas to enhance national energy security and regional economic development, plus reduce the environmental impact of GEN-IV nuclear reactors plus liquid fuels production and use. These new technologies offer promising concepts for using low-risk technologies to provide security and economic stability for US energy supplies.
