= Peach Bottom Unit 1 =

Decommissioned nuclear power plant

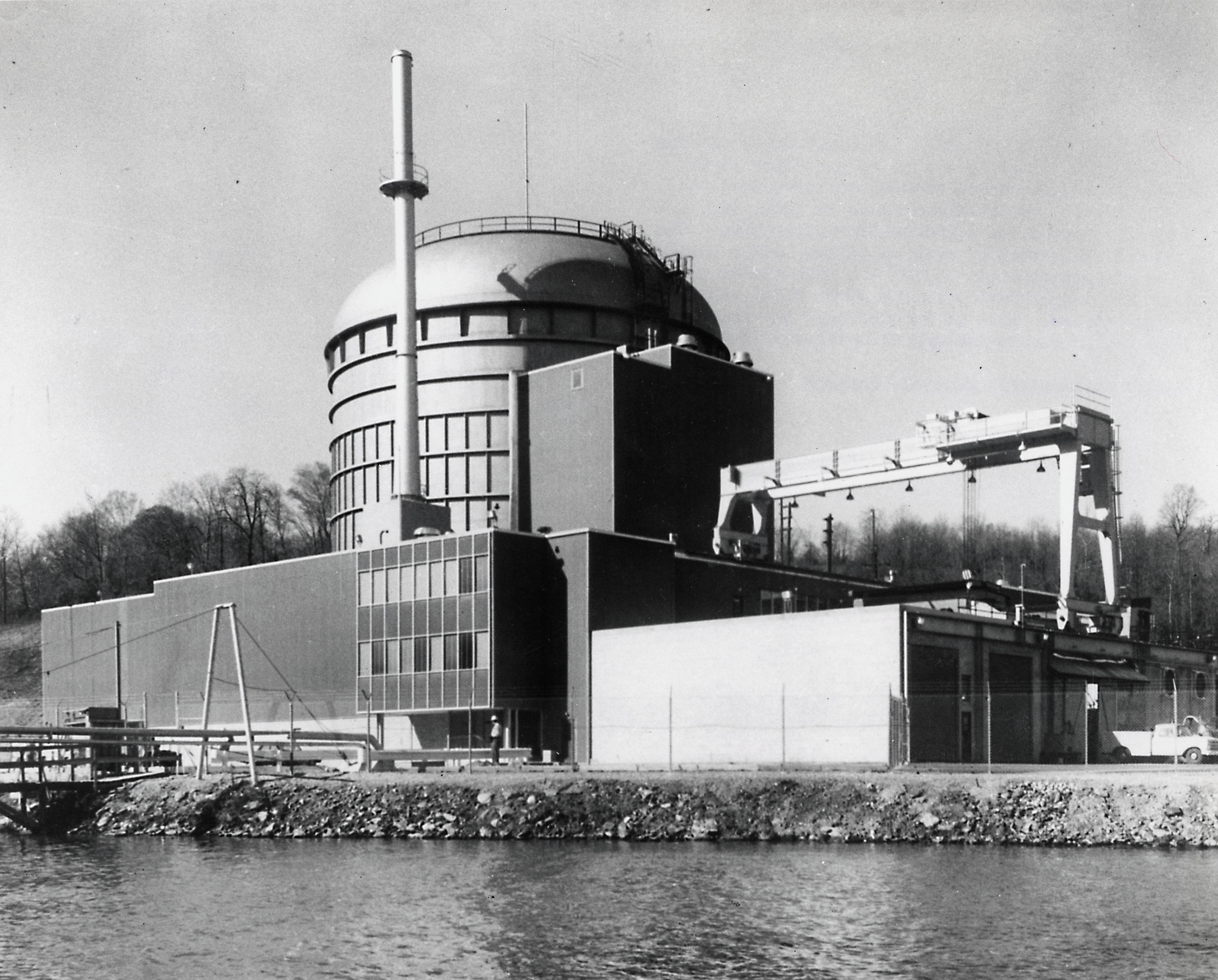
- Peach Bottom Unit 1
- Reactor concept: High-temperature gas-cooled reactor
- Designed by: General Atomics
- Operational: 1966 to 1974
- Status: SAFSTOR
- Location: Peach Bottom, Pennsylvania
- Coordinates: 39°45′30″N 76°16′5″W

Main parameters of the reactor core
- Fuel (fissile material): Mixed ^{232}Th-^{235}U
- Fuel state: Solid carbide
- Neutron energy spectrum: Thermal
- Primary control method: Control rods
- Primary moderator: Nuclear graphite
- Primary coolant: Helium
- Outlet temperature: 700 °C (1,292 °F)

Reactor usage
- Primary use: Demonstration
- Power (thermal): 115 MW_{th}
- Power (electric): 40 MW_{e}
- Operator/owner: Philadelphia Electric Company

Peach Bottom Unit 1 was a nuclear power plant on the Susquehanna River near the unincorporated village of Peach Bottom, Pennsylvania. Commissioned as a demonstration plant in 1966, it was the first high-temperature gas-cooled reactor (HTGR) to produce electricity. The facility operated until 1974. The site today lies in the grounds of Peach Bottom Nuclear Generating Station.

== History ==
The Peach Bottom plant was intended as a prototype and pilot for a later, commercial HTGR reactor. Design work was funded by the Atomic Energy Commission under its Power Reactor Demonstration Program initiative, and carried out by General Atomics corporation. A consortium of over 50 different utility companies contributed to the project, with the Philadelphia Electric Company among them as an operator. The reactor first attained criticality in 1967. During the first four years of operation, the plant experienced major difficulties with the reactor fuel elements, which had to be re-installed twice.

The reactor was a helium-cooled, graphite-moderated reactor fueled by mixed fertile ^{232}Th and fissile ^{235}U carbides. The fuel in its first core consisted of spherical thorium and uranium carbide kernels encased with pyrolytic carbon (PyC) to prevent hydrolysis during the manufacturing process. In 1970, the reactor's second core replaced this fuel with experimental bistructural-isotropic (BISO) fuel, which used an inner carbon layer to buffer recoiling fission products and an outer hard PyC layer to retain noble gases.

As intended, the plant provided valuable R&D information for the follow-up, full-scale Fort Saint Vrain high-temperature gas-cooled reactor plant, built in Colorado. The testing of BISO fuel at Peach Bottom led to the development of tristructural-isotropic (TRISO) fuel, which added an additional layer of silicon carbide. This fuel, developed contemporaneously at the Dragon reactor, was used commercially at Fort Saint Vrain.
