= SINAP =

SINAP or Sinap may refer to:

== Nature preservation ==
(Spanish: Sistema Nacional de Áreas Protegidas, lit. 'National System of Protected Areas')

- National System of Protected Areas (Colombia), the Colombian national parks administrator
- National System of Protected Areas (Nicaragua), the Nicaraguan national parks administrator

== Other uses ==
- Shanghai Institute of Applied Physics, part of the Chinese Academy of Sciences
- Stroke Improvement National Audit Programme, a clinical audit commissioned by the UK Healthcare Quality Improvement Partnership
- Sinap Castle, Çamlıyayla ilçe, Mersin, Turkey; an Armenian medieval castle
- Sinap, Erdemli, Erdemli, Mersin, Turkey; a neighbourhood
- Sinap (died 1997), Belgian cartoonist; see 1997 in comics

== See also ==
- Synap, online assessement and learning platform
- Synapse (disambiguation)
