= TMSR-LF1 =

Molten salt reactor prototype

- Generation: IV
- Reactor concept: MSR
- Fertile material: Thorium
- Status: Active
- Location: China
Maps

TMSR-LF1 (trefoil) in Gansu province (red).
TMSR-LF1 (trefoil) within Minqin county (orange) is roughly 120 km (75 miles) north of the city of Wuwei (circled star)
- Coordinates: 38.9602°N 102.6122°E

Main parameters of the reactor core
- Fuel (fissile material): HALEU
- Fuel state: Liquid
- Neutron energy spectrum: Thermal
- Primary control method: Rods
- Primary moderator: Graphite
- Primary coolant: FLiBe

Reactor usage
- Primary use: Prototyping
- Power (thermal): 2 MW
- Criticality (date): 11 Oct 2023
- Operator/owner: SINAP

TMSR-LF1 (Chinese: 液态燃料钍基熔盐实验堆 lit.: "liquid fuel thorium-based molten salt experimental reactor") is a 2 MW_{t} molten salt reactor (MSR) prototype operating in northwest China.^{[location note]}

The project is a collaboration of "nearly 100 domestic research institutions, universities and industrial companies", "dedicated to molten salt reactors and thorium-uranium fuel cycle studies".

== History ==
TMSR-LF1 site timelapse (2018-2025) from Sentinel-2 satellite imagery

The "LF" (liquid fuel) design is directly based on the 1960s Molten-Salt Reactor Experiment. The site selected for the TMSR-LF1 is part of an industrial park for the chemical and energy sectors, in a sparsely populated, arid region.^{[location note]} Site construction began in 2018. At the groundbreaking, a Taoist ceremony was held; after images of it went viral in China (an atheist state), CAS disciplined staff members, and issued a public apology.

A reactor construction permit was issued by the Chinese National Nuclear Safety Administration in January 2020. Unforeseen delays were caused by the COVID-19 pandemic in China. Installation of equipment was finished in 2022. Over 90 percent of the reactor's components are domestically produced, with 100 percent localization of key parts and a fully independent supply chain.

Testing followed; in August 2022, the Chinese Ministry of Ecology and Environment informed SINAP that its commissioning plan for the LF1 had been approved. A ten-year operating license was issued in June 2023. For the first 5–8 years, it is to be run in batch mode, before converting to continuous mode.

Criticality was first achieved on 11 October 2023. On 17 June 2024, full power (2MW_{t}) operation was achieved. In September, it received a license to load thorium into the molten salt, the initial loading of which happened the following month, and on 8 October, it operated at full power for 10 days with thorium in the molten salt; Protactinium-233 was detected, indicating successful nuclear breeding.

== Specifications ==
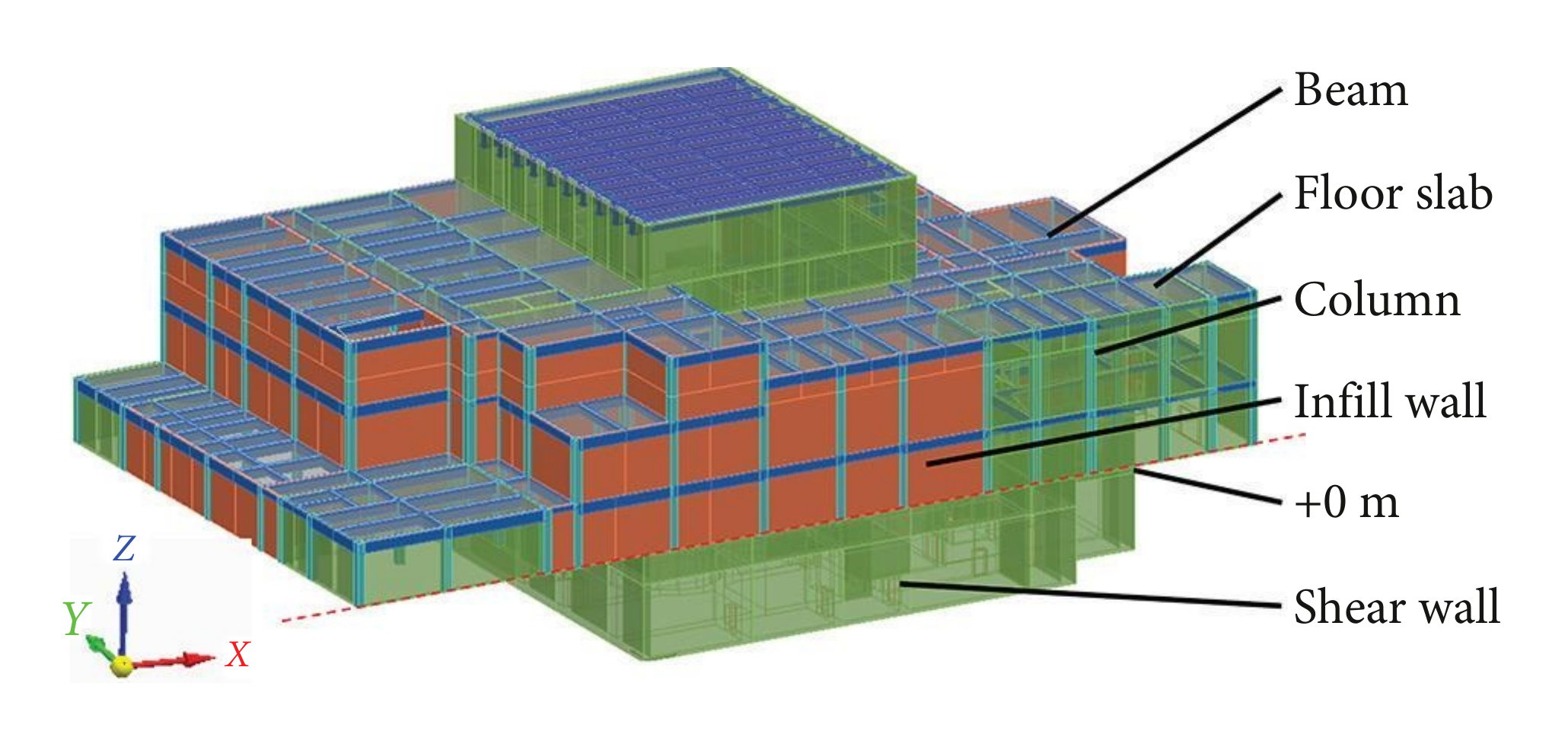
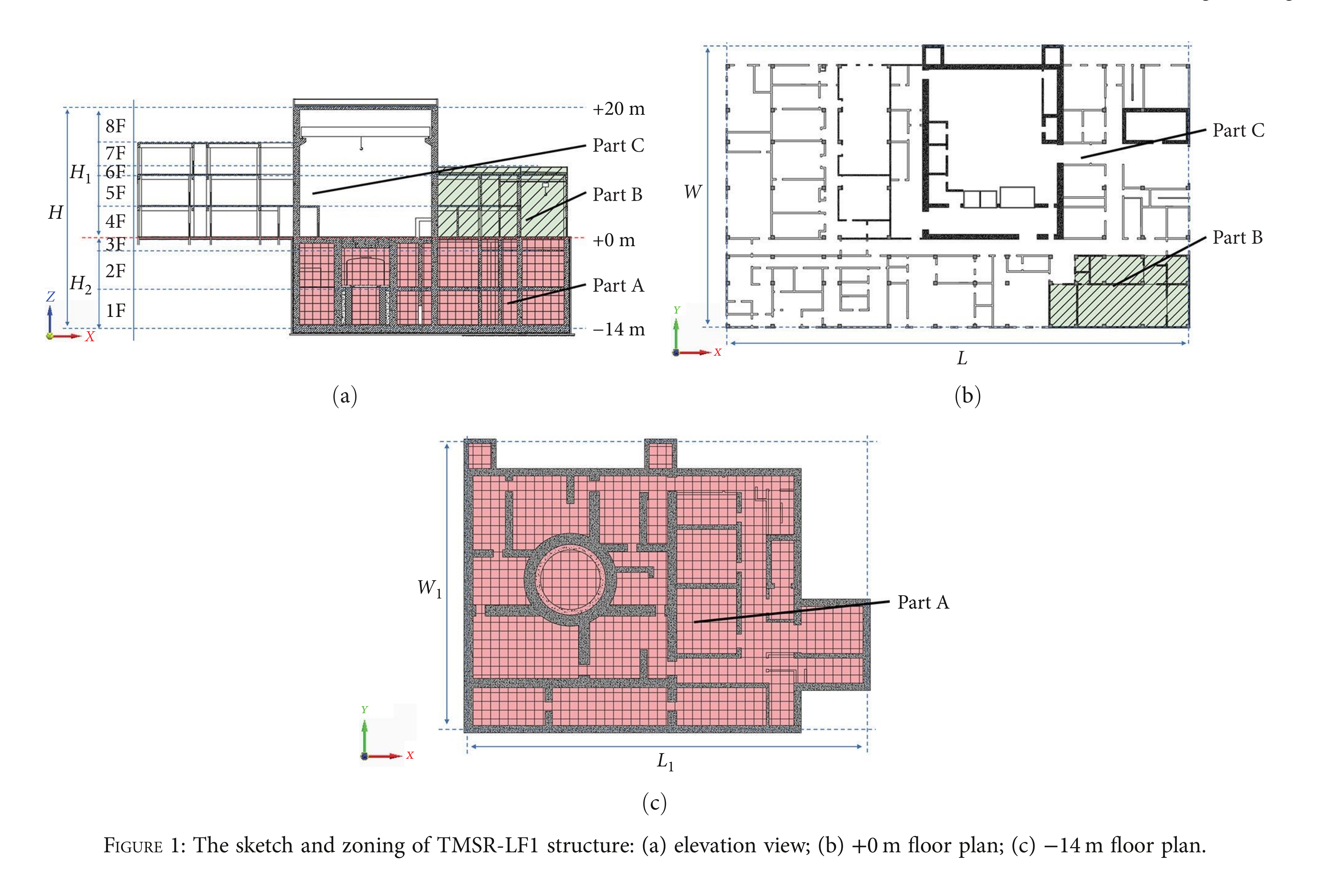
LF1 building 3D model and floor plan published for seismic analysis; below-ground area (pink) holds the reactor.

The TMSR-LF1 is a Generation IV reactor constructed with the following specifications:

- Thermal power: 2 MW
- Fuel salt: FLiBe (>99.95% Li-7) with fluorides of zirconium, uranium (HALEU: 19.75% U-235), and thorium
  - inlet temperature: 630 °C
  - outlet temperature: 650 °C
  - volume: 1.68 m^{3}
  - flow rate: ~50 kg/s
- Coolant salt: FLiBe
  - inlet temperature: 560 °C
  - outlet temperature: 580 °C
  - flow rate: ~42 kg/s
- Cover gas: Argon (0.05 MPa)
  - volume: 1.6 m^{3}
- Moderator: nuclear graphite
- Structural Material: UNS N10003 superalloy
- Lifetime: 10 years
  - equivalent full power days: 300
  - maximum full power days per year: 60

The reactor is located underground, seated at the bottom of a 14m (46 foot) deep dry well, which is capped at ground level, and above which rises a 20m (66 foot) tall roofed atrium.

== Location Notes ==
See also "Maps" section of the lede's infobox. The most recently published official site plan map is Figure 2.1-2 in

^LF1 Location: the LF1 reactor is sited within an industrial park located in Hongshagang (town), Minqin (county), Wuwei (prefecture), Gansu (province), China. The area is a semi-desert just south of the Badain Jaran section of the Gobi. As per official documentation, the TMSR-LF1 site is located at 38°57'31" N, 102°36'55" E. However, due to the China GPS shift problem, the reactor location using Western GPS coordinates is approximately 38.9602°N 102.6122°E (about a third of a kilometer offset).
