= International Friendship Bell =

Monument in Oak Ridge, Tennessee, United States

- International Friendship Bell in September 2026
- Interactive map of International Friendship Bell
- Location: A.K. Bissell Park, Oak Ridge, Tennessee, United States
- Coordinates: 36°00′43″N 84°15′45″W
- Designer: Suzanna Harris
- Builder: Sotetsu Iwazawa (foundry, Kyoto, Japan)
- Type: Bell
- Material: Bronze
- Width: 5 feet (1.5 m)
- Height: 7 feet (2.1 m)
- Weight: 8,000 pounds (3,600 kg)
- Beginning date: 1991
- Completion date: 1993
- Dedicated to: Peace and reconciliation between the United States and Japan

The International Friendship Bell, also known as Oak Ridge International Friendship Bell, is a monument in Oak Ridge, Tennessee, United States. According to the authors, it is "a symbol of unity that carries the message of peace and friendship into the future."

At nearly 7 feet (2.1 m) feet tall and 5 feet (1.5 m) wide, this 8,000-pound (3629 kilograms) bronze bell hangs at A. K. Bissell Park. Oak Ridge is where the enriched uranium for the world’s first atomic weapons was manufactured.

Designed in Oak Ridge and cast in Kyoto, Japan, the relief panels on the bell show imagery inspired by Tennessee, Japan, and the tragedies of war between the two nations.

== History ==
On August 6, 1945, the US Army Air Forces dropped the uranium-fueled Little Boy atomic bomb over Hiroshima in the first of only two atomic bombings of a population in history, killing 80,000 people in just the first few minutes. The Manhattan Project facilities at Oak Ridge, TN produced the enriched uranium used in the Little Boy atomic bomb.

In 1963, Japanese citzens Shigeko and Ram Uppuluri arrived in Oak Ridge along with their two-year old son, Ram Jr., Shigeko. When Shigeko and Ram visited Japan in 1987, they drew inspiration from a bonsho bell hanging in Buddhist Gangoyo-ji Temple to launch the Project Peace Bell.

The project collected $750,000 in donations to design, fabricate, deliver and install the bell, by citizens and foundations in Japan and United States.

Designed in Oak Ridge, in 1991 by local artist Suzanna Harris, and cast in Kyoto, Japan, in 1993 by Japanese bell-maker Sotetsu Iwazawa, the relief panels display peaceful images inspired by Tennessee, Japan, as well as tragedies of war between the two nations: the attack on Pearl Harbor, VJ, and the atomic bombings of Horishima and Nagasaki .

It was dedicated in 1996 and visitors are encourage to ring the bell. Since then, local organizations hold a ceremony to commemorate the atomic bombing every August 6.
