= Alvin M. Weinberg =

American nuclear physicist (1915–2006)

Alvin Martin Weinberg
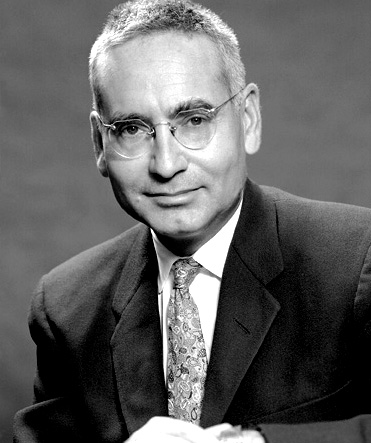
- Alvin Weinberg, c. 1960
- Born: April 20, 1915; Chicago, Illinois
- Died: October 18, 2006 (aged 91); Oak Ridge, Tennessee
- Citizenship: American
- Education: University of Chicago
- Known for: Manhattan Project; Aircraft Nuclear Propulsion; Aircraft Reactor Experiment
- Awards: Ernest Orlando Lawrence Award (1960) Atoms for Peace Award (1960) Enrico Fermi Award (1980)
- Scientific career
- Fields: Nuclear physics
- Workplaces: Metallurgical Laboratory; Oak Ridge National Laboratory; U.S. Office of Energy Research and Development; Oak Ridge Associated Universities; International Atomic Energy Agency
- Thesis: Mathematical Foundations for a Theory of Biophysical Periodicity (1939)
- Doctoral advisor: Carl Eckart

Alvin Martin Weinberg (/ˈwaɪnbɜːrɡ/; April 20, 1915 – October 18, 2006) was an American nuclear physicist who was the administrator of Oak Ridge National Laboratory (ORNL) during and after the Manhattan Project. He came to Oak Ridge, Tennessee, in 1945 and remained there until his death in 2006. He was the first to use the term "Faustian bargain" to describe nuclear energy.

A graduate of the University of Chicago, which awarded him his doctorate in mathematical biophysics in 1939, Weinberg joined the Manhattan Project's Metallurgical Laboratory in September 1941. The following year he became part of Eugene Wigner's Theoretical Group, whose task was to design the nuclear reactors that would convert uranium into plutonium.

Weinberg replaced Wigner as director of research at ORNL in 1948, and became director of the laboratory in 1955. Under his direction it worked on the Aircraft Nuclear Propulsion program, and pioneered many innovative reactor designs, including the pressurized water reactors (PWRs) and boiling water reactors (BWRs) which have since become the dominant reactor types in commercial nuclear power plants, and Aqueous Homogeneous Reactor designs.

In 1960, Weinberg was appointed to the President's Science Advisory Committee in the Eisenhower administration and later served on it in the Kennedy administration. After leaving the ORNL in 1973, he was named director of the Office of Energy Research and Development in Washington, D.C., in 1974. The following year he founded and became the first director of the Institute for Energy Analysis at Oak Ridge Associated Universities (ORAU).

== Early years in Chicago ==
Alvin Martin Weinberg was born April 20, 1915, in Chicago, Illinois, the son of Jacob Weinberg and Emma Levinson Weinberg, two Russian Jewish emigrants who met in 1905 on board the boat carrying them to the United States. He had an older sister, Fay Goleman, who was born on November 30, 1910. She later became a sociology professor at the University of the Pacific, and was the mother of Daniel Goleman. He attended Theodore Roosevelt High School in Chicago.

Weinberg entered the University of Chicago, from which he received his Bachelor of Science (B.S.) degree in physics in 1935, and his Master of Science (M.S.) in physics the following year. He received his Ph.D. from the University of Chicago in mathematical biophysics in 1939, writing his thesis on Mathematical foundations for a theory of biophysical periodicity, under the supervision of Carl Eckart. Weinberg later lamented that, in restricting his thesis to linear systems, he had overlooked interesting nonlinear systems that Ilya Prigogine later received the Nobel Prize in Chemistry for studying.

While at Chicago, Weinberg was hired by the family of Margaret Despres, a student at the University of Chicago, to tutor her in mathematics. They were married on June 14, 1940. They had two sons, David Robert Weinberg and Richard J. Weinberg.

== Metallurgical Laboratory ==
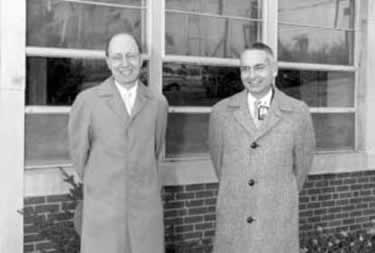
Eugene Wigner (left) with Weinberg (right) at the Oak Ridge National Laboratory

Weinberg taught courses at Wright Junior College. He applied for and received a National Research Council fellowship to study under Kenneth S. Cole at Columbia University, but never took it up, as Cole came to Chicago to work on the Manhattan Project as a radiation biologist. Weinberg was recruited to work at its Metallurgical Laboratory at the University of Chicago in September 1941 by Eckart and Samuel Allison, who needed someone to work on the latter's neutron capture calculations.

In early 1942, Arthur Compton concentrated the Manhattan Project's various teams working on plutonium at the University of Chicago. This brought in many top scientists including Herbert Anderson, Bernard Feld, Enrico Fermi, Leó Szilárd and Walter Zinn from Columbia, and Edward Creutz, Gilbert Plass, Eugene Wigner and John Wheeler from Princeton University. Weinberg became a protégé of Wigner.

Wigner led the Theoretical Group at the Metallurgical Laboratory that included Alvin Weinberg, Katharine Way, Gale Young and Edward Creutz. The group's task was to design the production nuclear reactors that would convert uranium into plutonium. At the time, reactors existed only on paper, and no reactor had yet gone critical. In July 1942, Wigner chose a conservative 100 MW design, with a graphite neutron moderator and water cooling. The choice of water as a coolant was controversial at the time. Water was known to absorb neutrons, thereby reducing the efficiency of the reactor, but Wigner was confident that his group's calculations were correct and that water would work, while the technical difficulties involved in using helium or liquid metal as coolants would delay the project.

After the United States Army Corps of Engineers took over the Manhattan Project, it gave responsibility for the detailed design and construction of the reactors to DuPont. There was friction between the company and Wigner and his team. Major differences between Wigner's reactor design and DuPont's included increasing the number of process tubes from 1,500 in a circular array to 2,004 in a square array, and cutting the power from 500 MW to 250 MW. As it turned out, the design decision by DuPont to give the reactor additional tubes came in handy when neutron poisoning became a problem for the B Reactor at the Hanford Site. The extra tubes allowed a greater fuel load to overcome the poisoning. Without them the reactor would have had to be run at low power until enough of the boron impurities in the graphite had been burned up to allow it to reach full power, which would have delayed full operation by up to a year.

As the reactors at Hanford came online, the Metallurgical Laboratory turned its attention back to theoretical designs. The discovery of spontaneous fission in reactor-bred plutonium due to contamination by plutonium-240 led Wigner to propose switching to breeding uranium-233 from thorium, but the challenge was met by the Los Alamos Laboratory developing an implosion-type nuclear weapon design. Wigner was also intrigued by the possibility of doing away with much of the complexities of a reactor by having the uranium in solution or a slurry in heavy water. The Metallurgical Laboratory attempted to find a way of doing this.

Amongst the competing designs, Weinberg proposed the pressurized water reactor, which ultimately became the most common design. This was only one of the many possibilities discussed by Weinberg and his colleagues at Chicago and Oak Ridge. Later, he wrote:

In these early days we explored all sorts of power reactors, comparing the advantages and disadvantages of each type. The number of possibilities was enormous, since there are many possibilities for each component of a reactor—fuel, coolant, moderator. The fissile material may be ^{233}U, ^{235}U, or ^{239}Pu; the coolant may be: water, heavy water, gas, or liquid metal; the moderator may be: water, heavy water, beryllium, graphite—or, in a fast- neutron reactor, no moderator. I have calculated that, if one counted all the combinations of fuel, coolant, and moderator, one could identify about a thousand distinct reactors. Thus, at the very beginning of nuclear power, we had to choose which possibilities to pursue, which to ignore.

The ultimate success of the pressurized water reactor, he wrote, was due less to any superior characteristics of water, but rather to the decision to power the prototype of the Mark I submarine thermal reactor with a pressurized version of the Materials Testing Reactor at Oak Ridge. Once pressurized water was established, other possibilities became too expensive to pursue, but Weinberg remained interested in other possibilities. According to Freeman Dyson, he was the only nuclear pioneer who supported the wide universe of reactor designs.

== Work at Oak Ridge ==
In 1945, Wigner accepted a position as the director of research at the Clinton Laboratories in Oak Ridge, Tennessee, which then had a staff of about 800. He took with him his protégés Gale Young, Katherine Way and Weinberg. Weinberg, who was the first to arrive at Oak Ridge in May 1945, became head of the Physics Division in 1946. But after the Atomic Energy Commission took over responsibility for the laboratory's operations from the Manhattan Project at the start of 1947, Wigner, feeling unsuited to a managerial role in the new environment, left Oak Ridge at the end of summer in 1947 and returned to Princeton University.

The administration of the Clinton Laboratories passed from Monsanto to the University of Chicago in May 1947, and then to Union Carbide in December 1947. The Atomic Energy Commission's influential General Advisory Committee, chaired by J. Robert Oppenheimer, recommended that all work on reactors be concentrated at the Argonne National Laboratory, the successor to the Metallurgical Laboratory, near Chicago. There was also competition for staff and resources from the newly established Brookhaven National Laboratory near New York. Morale was low, and no one could be found to take on the job of director of research at the laboratory, renamed the Oak Ridge National Laboratory (ORNL) in January 1948. At least six people turned down the job before Union Carbide's acting Director, Nelson (Bunny) Rucker, asked Weinberg to become director of research in March 1948.

Weinberg was subsequently appointed director in 1955. He often sat in the front row at ORNL division information meetings and he would ask the first, often very penetrating, question after each scientific talk. For young scientists giving their first presentation, the experience could be frightening, but it was also exciting and stimulating. When asked how he found the time to attend every meeting, Weinberg replied jokingly, "We didn't have a DOE in those days."

=== Reactor development ===
The Aircraft Nuclear Propulsion (ANP) project was ORNL's biggest program, using 25% of ORNL's budget. The ANP project's military goal was to produce a nuclear-powered aircraft (a bomber) to overcome the range limitations of jet-fueled aircraft at that time. That the project had little chance of success was not overlooked, but it provided employment and allowed ORNL to stay in the reactor development business. ORNL successfully built and operated a prototype of an aircraft reactor power plant by creating the world's first molten salt fueled and cooled reactor called the Aircraft Reactor Experiment (ARE) in 1954, which set a record high temperature of operation of 1,600 °F (870 °C). Due to the radiation hazard posed to aircrew, and people on the ground in the event of a crash, new developments in ballistic missile technology, aerial refueling and longer range jet bombers, President Kennedy canceled the program in June 1961.

Weinberg had the Materials Testing Reactor converted into a mock-up of a real reactor called the Low Intensity Test Reactor (LITR) or "Poor Man's Pile". Experiments at the LITR led to the design of both pressurized water reactors (PWRs) and boiling water reactors (BWRs), which have since become the dominant reactor types in commercial nuclear power plants. Weinberg was attracted to the simplicity and self-controlling features of nuclear reactors that used fluid fuels, such as Harold Urey and Eugene Wigner's proposed Aqueous Homogeneous Reactor. Therefore, to support the Nuclear Aircraft project in the late 1940s, Weinberg asked ORNL's reactor engineers to design a reactor using liquid instead of solid fuel.

This Homogeneous Reactor Experiment (HRE) was affectionately dubbed "Alvin's 3P reactor" because it required a pot, a pipe, and a pump. The HRE went into operation in 1950 and, at the criticality party, Weinberg brought the appropriate spirits: "When piles go critical in Chicago, we celebrate with wine. When piles go critical in Tennessee, we celebrate with Jack Daniel's." The HRE operated for 105 days before it was closed down. Despite its leaks and corrosion, valuable information was gained from its operation and it proved a simple and safe reactor to control. During the time the HRE was online, Senators John F. Kennedy and Albert Gore, Sr. visited ORNL and were hosted by Weinberg.

=== Molten salt reactors ===
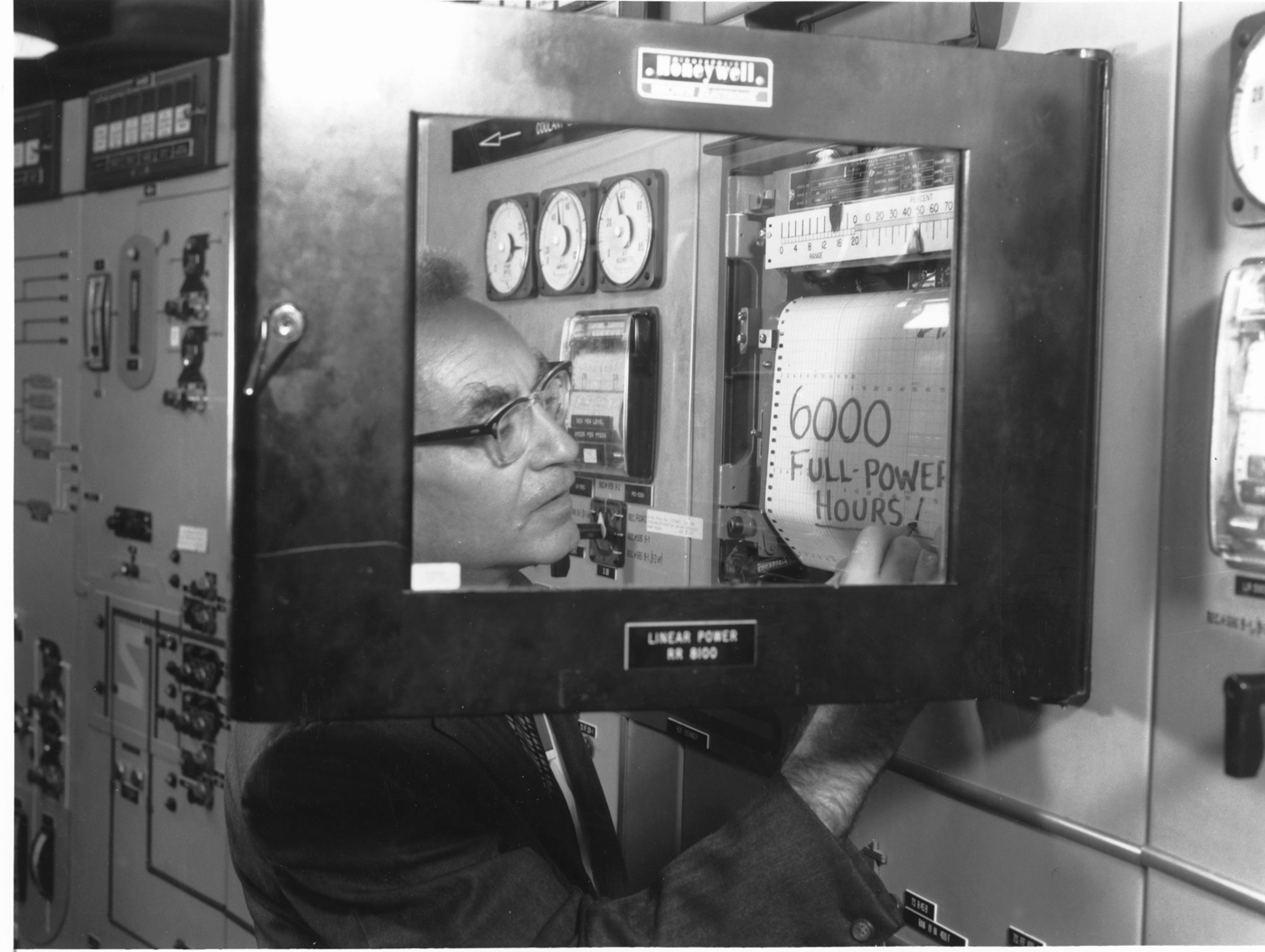
Weinberg noting "6000 full-power hours!" of MSRE operation in 1967.

Under Weinberg, ORNL shifted its focus to a civilian version of the meltdown-proof Molten Salt Reactor (MSR) away from the military's "daft" idea of nuclear-powered aircraft. The Molten-Salt Reactor Experiment (MSRE) set a record for continuous operation and was the first to use Thorium irradiated to produce uranium-233 as fuel. It also used plutonium-239 and the standard, naturally occurring uranium-235. The MSR was known as the "chemist's reactor" because it was proposed mainly by chemists (ORNL's Ray Briant and Ed Bettis (an engineer) and NEPA's Vince Calkins), and because it used a chemical solution of melted salts containing the actinides (uranium, thorium, and/or plutonium) in a carrier salt, most often composed of beryllium (BeF_{2}) and lithium (LiF) (isotopically depleted in Lithium-6 to prevent excessive neutron capture or tritium production) – FLiBe. The MSR also afforded the opportunity to change the chemistry of the molten salt while the reactor was operating to remove fission products and add new fuel or change the fuel, all of which is called "online processing".

=== Biological and environmental studies ===
Under Weinberg's tenure as director, ORNL's Biology Division grew to five times the size of the next largest division. This division was charged with understanding how ionizing radiation interacts with living things and to try to find ways to help them survive radiation damage, such as bone marrow transplants. In the 1960s Weinberg also pursued new missions for ORNL, such as using nuclear energy to desalinate seawater. He recruited Philip Hammond from the Los Alamos National Laboratory to further this mission and in 1970 started the first big ecology project in the United States: the National Science Foundation – Research Applied to National Needs Environmental Program.

=== Leadership ===
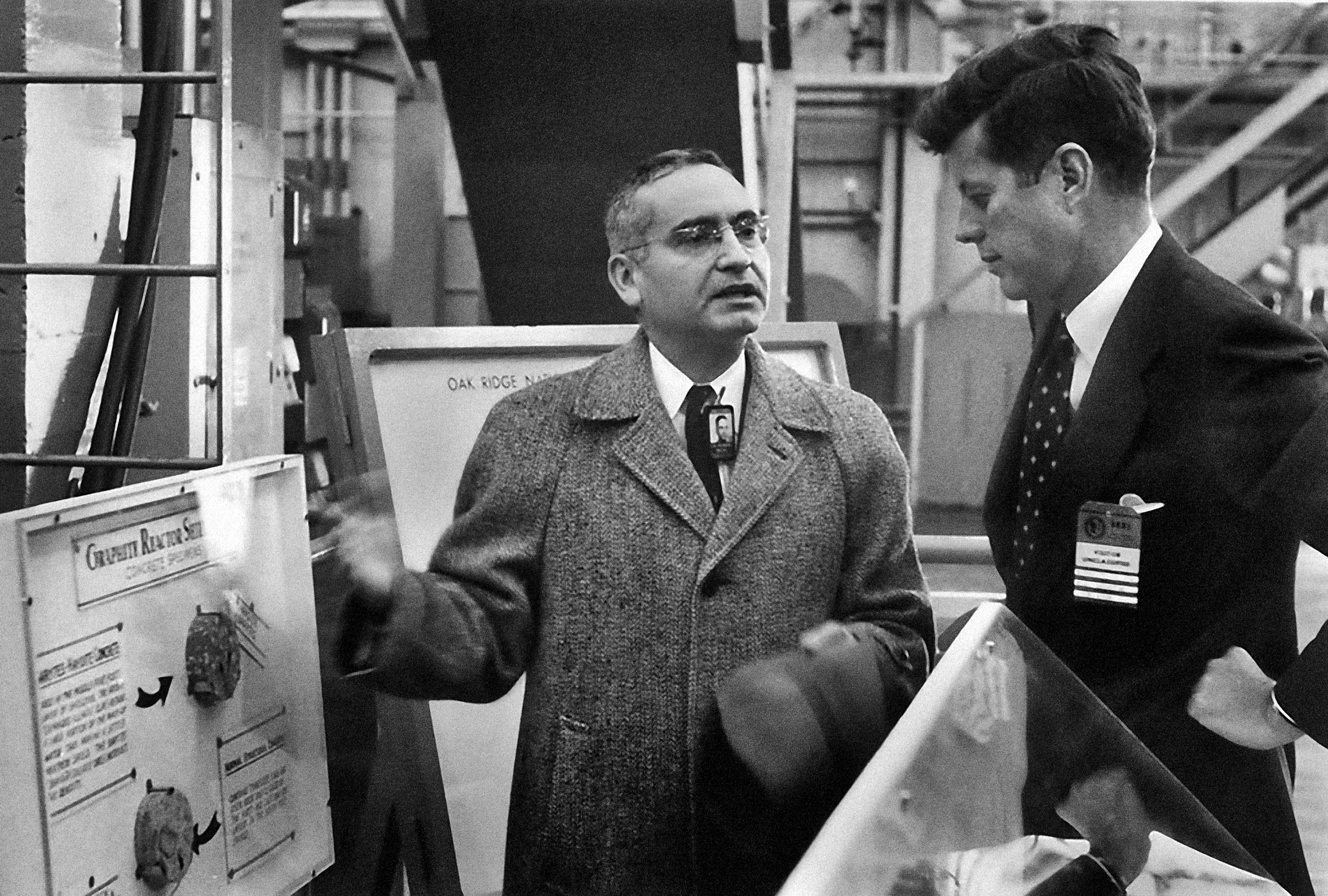
Weinberg speaks with Senator John F. Kennedy at Oak Ridge in 1959

In 1958, Weinberg coauthored the first nuclear reactor textbook, The Physical Theory of Neutron Chain Reactors, with Wigner. The following year, 1959, he was elected president of the American Nuclear Society and, in 1960, began service on the President's Science Advisory Committee under the Eisenhower and Kennedy administrations. Starting in 1945 with Patent #2,736,696, Weinberg, usually with Wigner, filed numerous patents on the light water reactor (LWR) technology that has provided the United States' primary nuclear reactors. The main LWR types are Pressurized Water Reactors (PWRs) and Boiling Water Reactors (BWRs), that serve in Naval propulsion and commercial nuclear power. In 1965 he was appointed vice president of Union Carbide's Nuclear Division.

In a 1971 paper, Weinberg first used the term "Faustian bargain" to describe nuclear energy:

We nuclear people have made a Faustian bargain with society. On the one hand we offer—in the catalytic nuclear burner (i.e., the breeder)—an inexhaustible source of energy. Even in the short range, when we use ordinary reactors, we offer energy that is cheaper than energy from fossil fuel. Moreover, this source of energy when properly handled is almost nonpolluting. Whereas fossil-fuel burners emit oxides of carbon, nitrogen, and sulfur... there is no intrinsic reason why nuclear systems must emit any pollutant except heat and traces of radioactivity. But the price that we demand of society for this magical source is both a vigilance from and longevity of our social institutions that we are quite unaccustomed to.

Weinberg was fired by the Nixon administration from ORNL in 1973 after 18 years as the laboratory's director, because he continued to advocate increased nuclear safety and molten salt reactors (MSRs), instead of the Administration's chosen Liquid Metal Fast Breeder Reactor (LMFBR) that the AEC's Director of Reactor Division, Milton Shaw, was appointed to develop. Weinberg's firing effectively halted development of the MSR, as it was virtually unknown by other nuclear laboratories and specialists. There was a brief revival of MSR research at ORNL as part of the Carter administration's nonproliferation interests, culminating in ORNL-TM-7207, "Conceptual Design Characteristics of a Denatured Molten-Salt Reactor with Once-Through Fueling", by Engel, et al., which is still considered by many to be the "reference design" for commercial molten salt reactors.

== After Oak Ridge ==
=== Washington and ORAU ===
Weinberg was named director of the Office of Energy Research and Development in Washington, D.C., in 1974. The following year he founded and became the first director of Institute for Energy Analysis at Oak Ridge Associated Universities (ORAU). This institute focused on evaluating alternatives for meeting future energy requirements. From 1976 to 1984, the Institute for Energy Analysis was a center for study of diverse issues related to carbon dioxide and global warming. He worked at ORAU until retiring to become an ORAU distinguished fellow in 1985.

In 1972 Weinberg published a landmark article in Minerva entitled Science and Trans-science, in which he focused on the interface between science and policy matters, especially governmental policy decisions:

Many of the issues which arise in the course of the interaction between science or technology and society—e.g., the deleterious side effects of technology, or the attempts to deal with social problems through the procedures of science—hang on the answers to questions which can be asked of science and yet which cannot be answered by science. I propose the term trans-scientific for these questions since, though they are, epistemologically speaking, questions of fact and can be stated in the language of science, they are unanswerable by science; they transcend science. In so far as public policy involves trans-scientific rather than scientific issues, the role of the scientist in contributing to the promulgation of such policy must be different from his role when the issues can be unambiguously answered by science.

In June, 1977, Weinberg testified at a congressional hearing of the House Subcommittee on the Environment and the Atmosphere concerning the impact of increasing carbon dioxide emissions on global average temperatures. He stated that a doubling of global carbon dioxide emissions by 2025, which some scientists predicted would occur, would lead to a two-degree Celsius increase in global average temperature.

=== Retirement ===
Weinberg remained active in retirement. In 1992 he was named chairman of the International Friendship Bell Committee, which arranged for the installation of a Japanese bell in Oak Ridge. He also called for strengthening of the International Atomic Energy Agency and systems to defend against nuclear weapons. His first wife, Margaret, died in 1969. He later married a stock broker, Genevieve DePersio, who died in 2004. His son David died in 2003. Weinberg died at his home in Oak Ridge on October 18, 2006. He was survived by his other son, Richard, and sister Fay Goleman.

=== Legacy ===
The Alvin Weinberg Foundation is named for him.

== Awards and honors ==
- Outstanding Young American of the Year Award (1950–51)
- Elected to the American Academy of Arts and Sciences (1960)
- Elected to the United States National Academy of Sciences (1961)
- Ernest Orlando Lawrence Award (1960)
- Atoms for Peace Award (1960)
- Elected member of the American Philosophical Society (1977)
- Enrico Fermi Award (1980)

== Books ==
- The Physical Theory of Neutron Chain Reactors, Alvin M. Weinberg & Eugene P. Wigner, University of Chicago Press, 1958.
- Reflections on Big Science, Cambridge: M.I.T. Press, 1967.
- The Second Nuclear Era: A New Start for Nuclear Power, Alvin M. Weinberg; Russ Manning, editor; New York: Praeger, 1985; ISBN 0-030-04144-9.
- Continuing the Nuclear Dialogue: Selected Essays, Alvin M. Weinberg; selected and with introductory comments by Russell M. Ball; La Grange Park, Illinois: American Nuclear Society, 1985; ISBN 0-8944-8552-0.
- Strategic Defenses and Arms Control, Edited by Alvin M. Weinberg, Jack N. Barkenbus. New York: Paragon House, 1988; ISBN 0-887-02218-9.
- Stability and Strategic Defenses, Edited by Jack N. Barkenbus and Alvin M. Weinberg, Washington, DC: Washington Institute Press, 1989; ISBN 0-887-02046-1.
- Nuclear Reactions: Science and Trans-Science, American Institute of Physics, 1992; ISBN 0-88318-861-9.
- The First Nuclear Era: The Life and Times of a Technological Fixer, New York: AIP Press, 1994. ISBN 1-56396-358-2. Weinberg's autobiography, covering the period from the early 1940s to the early 1990s.
