= Fort Saint Vrain Nuclear Power Plant =

Decommissioned Colorado nuclear power plant

Coordinates: 40°14′40″N 104°52′27″W

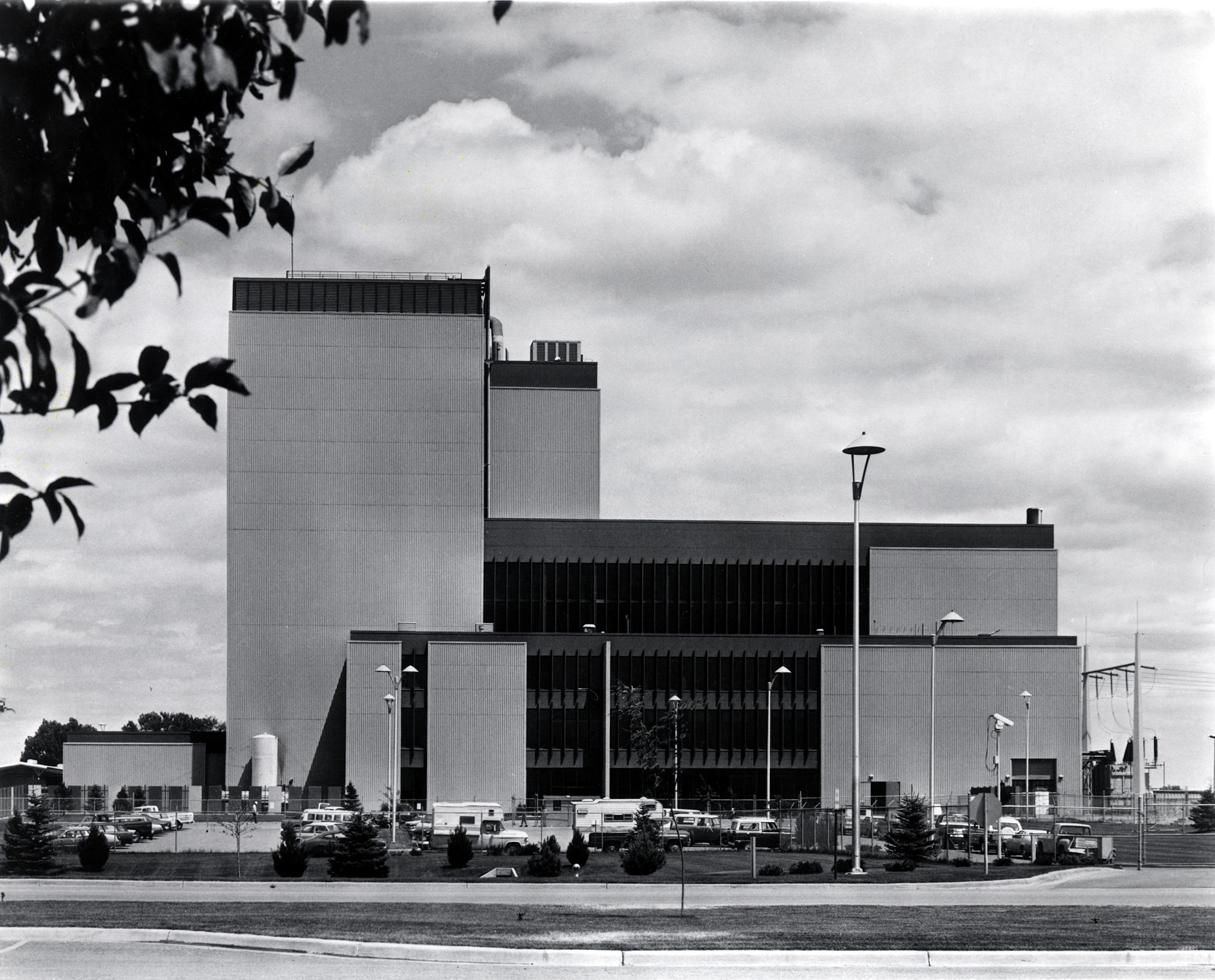
- Fort St. Vrain Generating Station
- Country: United States
- Location: Platteville, Colorado
- Status: Decommissioned
- Commission date: 1979, 1996 (as natural gas)
- Decommission date: 1989

Nuclear power station
- Reactor type: High-temperature gas reactor

Power generation
- Nameplate capacity: 330 MW_{e}

External links
- Commons: Related media on Commons

The Fort St. Vrain Nuclear Power Plant is a former commercial nuclear power station located near the town of Platteville in northern Colorado in the United States. It originally operated from 1979 until 1989. It had a 330 MWe high-temperature gas-cooled reactor (HTGR). The plant was decommissioned between 1989 and 1992.

In 1996, it was converted into a conventional natural gas powered generating station, which as of 2011 has a capacity of just under 1000 MW.

== Historical overview ==
Fort Saint Vrain Generating Station was built as Colorado's first and only nuclear power plant, which operated from 1979 until 1989. The plant was named after the historic front trading post Fort Saint Vrain, which was located about a mile north of it. It was the second of two high-temperature gas-cooled (HTGR) power reactors in the United States, after the 1967 Peach Bottom Unit 1 demonstration plant in Pennsylvania. The primary coolant helium transferred heat to a water secondary coolant system to drive steam generators. The reactor fuel was a combination of fissile uranium and fertile thorium microspheres dispersed within a prismatic graphite matrix. The reactor had an electrical power output of 330 MW (330 MW_{e}), generated from 842 MW (842 MW_{th}) of thermal power, which resulted in 39.2% efficiency.

The Fort St. Vrain HTGR power plant was proposed in March 1965, and its application was filed with the Atomic Energy Commission in October 1966. Construction began in September 1968. The HTGR design was safer than typical boiling-water designs of the time having steel-reinforced, prestressed concrete containment dome structures. It only needed a steel-frame containment structure, while the reactor core was partially contained within a prestressed concrete reactor pressure vessel (PCRV). The construction cost reached $200 million, or approximately $0.60 per installed watt. Initial testing began in 1972, and the first commercial power was distributed in July 1979.

The plant was technically successful, especially towards the very end of its operating life, but was a commercial disappointment to its owner. As one of the first commercial HTGR designs, the plant was a proof-of-concept for several advanced technologies, but had a number of early-adopter problems that required expensive corrections. Maintenance problems exacerbated these and other issues.

== Unique features of the design ==
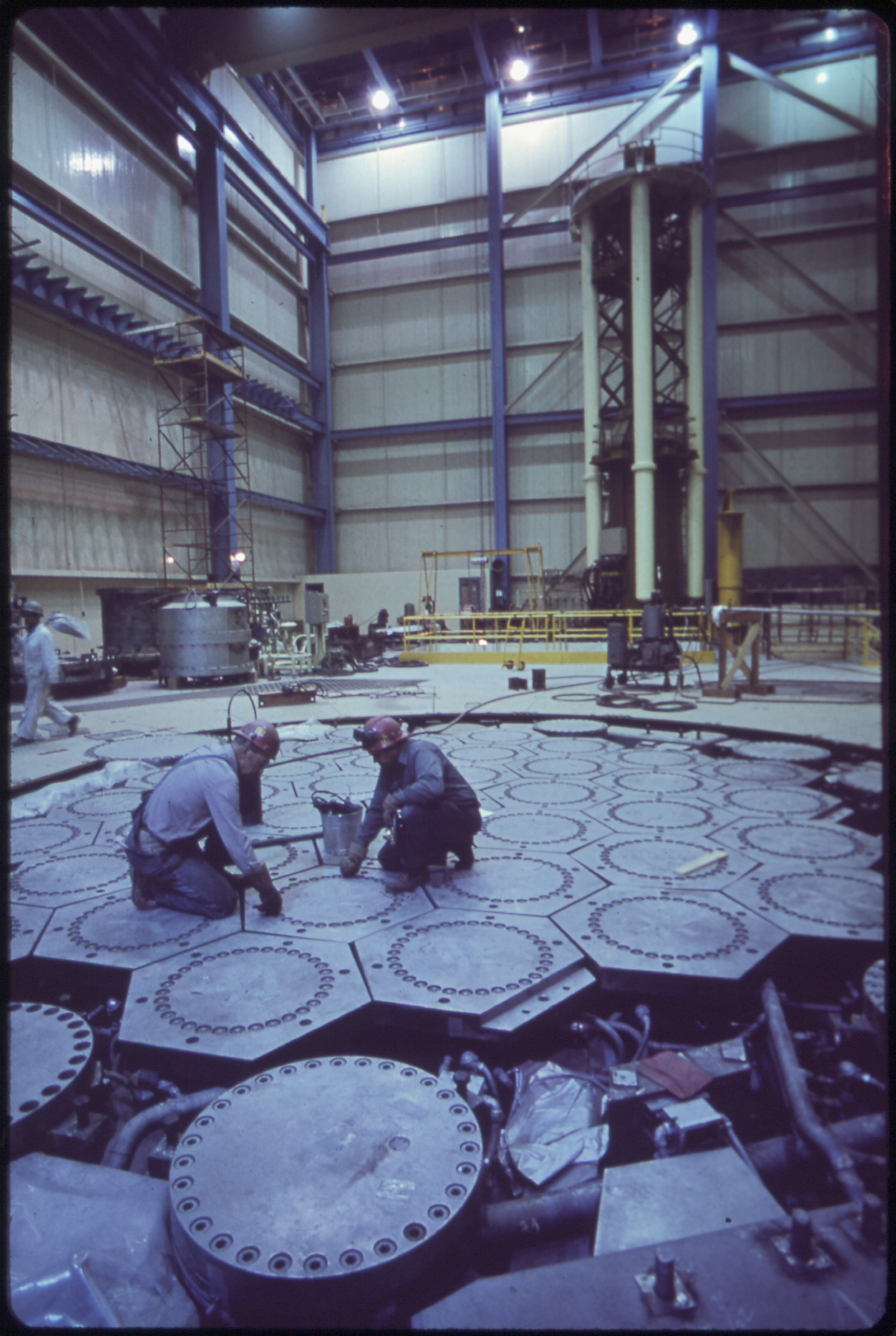
Refueling floor at Fort St. Vrain Generating Station

The Fort St. Vrain HTGR was substantially more efficient than modern light-water reactors, reaching a thermal efficiency of 39–40%, excellent for a steam-cycle power plant. Operation of the HTGR design could be readily attenuated to follow the electrical power demand load, rather than be required to generate its nameplate power all the time. The reactor was also comparatively fuel-efficient, with a maximum burnup of 90,000 megawatt-days thermal per metric ton of heavy metal (compared to contemporaneous light-water reactors with burn ups of 10,000–40,000 MWd/tHM). However, the problems that occurred leading to its debugging led to its early demise.

== Operational experience ==
Many issues occurred early in the operational experience of the Fort St. Vrain HTGR. These issues were a threat to public safety due to severe corrosion problems negatively influencing essential safety features, considerable stress was placed upon the personnel, equipment, and facilities and made continued operation appear uneconomical to the plant's owner. Most of the past issues had been resolved at considerable expense, and the plant was beginning to perform at a commercially viable level when an economic downturn and the history of the plant caused the owner to shut it down, even though it had not reached the end of its design lifetime.

Three major categories of problems were experienced at Fort St. Vrain: first, water infiltration and corrosion issues; second, electrical-system issues; and third, general facility issues.

=== Water infiltration and corrosion issues (helium circulators) ===
Diagram of the PCRV (left) and helium circulator (right) of the Fort St. Vrain reactor

Fort St. Vrain's largest problem was with the helium circulator. Helium's smaller atoms required very tight seals to prevent the gas from escaping. Some seals involved moving surfaces, and a water-lubricated bearing design was used to contain the helium. A gas-cleaning system was provided to remove contaminants, including water, from the helium system. Design problems resulted in too much water in the helium system, leading to corrosion.

The designers had intended for the water injectors to maintain pressure in the bearings about equal to the gas pressure in the system. In practice, the gas pressure varied more than expected, allowing excessive water to escape into the circulator.

The capacity of the gas-cleaning system did not account for the excess water from the bearings and assumed that high-temperature reactions in the graphite reactor core would reduce the impact of residual water in the helium, based on the porosity of typical core graphite. The graphite used to construct Fort St. Vrain's core was higher-grade and less porous, and thus did not present as much surface area for these reactions to occur.

Although system safety was not compromised, frequent operation problems were experienced throughout the reactor systems due to water and corrosion. Ice formed on chiller units in the gas-cleaning system, reducing their efficiency. When the reactor output was cycled down, and the system cooled, water would condense on equipment and instruments within the helium system. Control-rod drives rusted, and rapid shutdowns failed to operate correctly. The reserve shutdown system, which released borated graphite spheres into the core in the event of an anticipated transient without scram (ATWS), was sometimes unavailable because water had leached the boron to form boric acid, which softened the graphite spheres and caused them to clump together. Steel "tendons" within the PCRV experienced corrosion due to chloride precipitation and were weakened. Rust flecks migrated into the coolant and lodged in critical machinery, including control-rod drives. Steam-generator leaks also occurred due to corrosion.

Moisture alarms had generated alerts for months in critical parts of the plant, but these were disregarded as defective. Staff later sent to remove the allegedly defective moisture alarms for repair discovered that the moisture alarms were not defective, and substantial amounts of water were sometimes released when the devices were removed from their fittings.

Finally, the designers of the plant shared responsibility for not sizing the gas-cleaning system to cope with excess water in the helium system, as they should have foreseen a possibility of excess water infiltration. They acknowledged this in hindsight: "The FSV circulators have 'met all design specifications', however, the bearings, seals, and support systems for the water-lubricated bearing have caused many problems. Further, the circulators employed a steam turbine drive that adds complexity to system operations. These unique design features resulted in water ingress to the core, the primary reason for poor plant availability."

=== Electrical system issues ===
Operational diagram of the Fort St. Vrain high-temperature gas reactor

The plant electrical system was challenged on numerous occasions, and the resolutions were frequently expensive. Transformers experienced faults. Backup generators sometimes failed to engage when activated, and on other occasions, side-channel issues occurred during operation, preventing them from generating power. Failure of backup power also led to some of the moisture infiltration problems, by variously disrupting the logic of the bearing water-injection systems and the helium-circulator trip logic. Failures of transformers and consequent failure of backup power occurred on at least one occasion due to moisture infiltration into electric cables and subsequent ground faulting when the plant was at low power to remove water from previous moisture infiltration issues. It is believed that this electrical fault led to further moisture infiltration.

=== General facilities issues ===
Facility contractors introduced safety concerns on several occasions. In one of the more serious incidents, contractor personnel damaged hydraulic units, allowing hydraulic fluid to spray over reactor control cables. The same crew then performed welding operations to equipment located above the control cables. Hot slag fell onto the material used to contain the hydraulic fluid and ignited it, along with the fluid on the control cables. The fire involved the cables for five minutes, and 16 essential control cables were damaged. The contractor personnel then failed to inform plant personnel of the situation, and the reactor was in operation for several hours in this condition. On another occasion, contractor personnel using improperly grounded welding apparatuses tripped neutron protection circuits, leading to a nuisance trip of the entire plant.

=== Operational improvement and closure ===
Due to the water-induced corrosion problems and electrical problems, plant shutdowns were common. As a result, Public Service Company of Colorado began to question the economics of continued commercial operation. An increase in performance was observed from 1987 to 1989, suggesting that some of the problems had been worked out of the system, but Public Service was not persuaded. In 1989 Public Service indicated that the plant was under consideration for closure. Later that same year a critical part of the reactor was found to have long-term corrosion and required replacement. The replacement cost was deemed excessive, and the plant was shut down. The decommissioning and removal of the fuel was completed by 1992. Fort St. Vrain thus became the first commercial-scale nuclear reactor in the US to be decommissioned.

== Reuse as combustion power facility ==
Following the reactor decommissioning, Fort St. Vrain was converted to a conventional natural-gas-powered combustion facility. The first natural-gas combustion turbine was installed in 1996. Two more turbines were installed by 2001. Heat recovery steam generators (HRSGs) allow the plant to operate in combined-cycle mode, in which waste heat recovered from combustion-turbine exhaust gases is used to make a second stage of steam capable of driving the facility's original steam turbine and generator. As of 2011, the nameplate generating capacity of the plant is 965 MW.

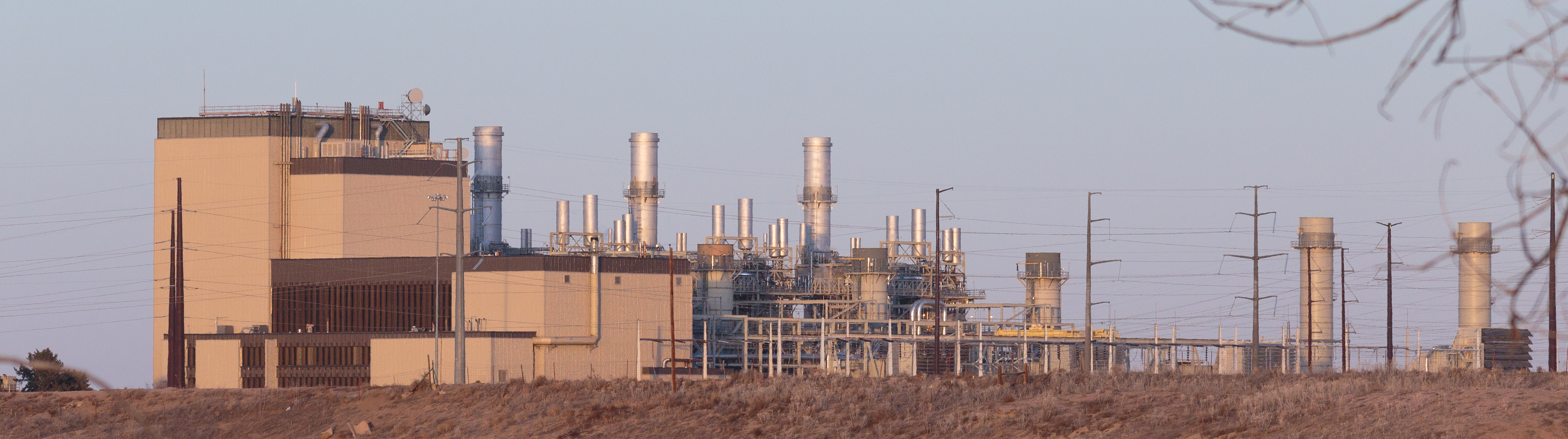
Fort Saint Vrain Generating Station as seen in 2024
