= CNP / ACP nuclear reactors =

Series of nuclear reactors developed by China National Nuclear Corporation

The CNP Generation II nuclear reactors (and Generation III successor ACP) were a series of nuclear reactors developed by China National Nuclear Corporation (CNNC), and are predecessors of the more current Hualong One design.

== CNP-300 ==
The CNP-300 is a pressurized water nuclear reactor developed by the China National Nuclear Corporation (CNNC).

It is China's first domestic commercial nuclear reactor design, with development beginning in the 1970s based on a nuclear submarine reactor design.

The reactor has a thermal capacity of 999 MW and a gross electrical capacity of 325 MW, with a net output of about 300 MWe and a single-loop design and .

The first CNP-300 unit started operations in Qinshan Nuclear Power Plant in 1991.

The CNP-300 was the first Chinese nuclear reactor to be exported, with the installation of the first unit at Chashma Nuclear Power Plant in Pakistan. The unit began operation in 2000. Another unit was completed in 2011 and two more units began operation in 2016 and 2017 at the same plant.

== CNP-600 ==
The CNP-600 is a generation II reactor pressurized water nuclear reactor developed by the China National Nuclear Corporation (CNNC).

It is based both on China's first commercial domestic nuclear reactor design, the CNP-300 and the M310 reactor design used in Daya Bay Nuclear Power Plant.

The reactor has a capacity of 650 MW, a 2-loop design and 121 fuel assemblies. Other features include single containment, 40-year design life and a 12-month fuel cycle.

The first CNP-600 unit began operation at Qinshan Nuclear Power Plant in 2002, with other 3 units coming online between 2004 and 2011. There have been built two further CNP-600 reactors at Changjiang Nuclear Power Plant, which went into regular operation in 2015 and 2016.

== ACP-600 ==
From the CNP-600, CNNC developed a Generation III successor named the ACP-600.

Similar to the CNP-600, the reactor will contain 121 fuel assemblies, but will be designed to operate on a longer 18-24 month fuel cycle. Other features include double containment, active and passive safety systems, improved response capability in the case of a station blackout event, digital instrumentation and control, and a 60-year design life.

No examples of this reactor type had been built.

== CNP-1000 ==
CNNC's largest CNP development was a three-loop 1000 MW version of the design designated CNP-1000. Work on the project began in the 1990s with the help of vendors Westinghouse and Framatome (now AREVA).

The first CNP-1000 units were due to be built at Fangjiashan (the same site as Qinshan). However, the design was subsequently changed to CGN's CPR-1000. Later, 4 units of the CNP-1000 were later built at Fuqing NPP. Further work on the CNP-1000 was stopped in favour of the ACP-1000.

== ACP-1000 ==
In 2013, CNNC announced that it had independently developed the ACP-1000, with Chinese authorities claiming full intellectual property rights over the design.

The reactor has a gross output of 1100MW, a 3-loop design and 177 fuel assemblies (12 ft active length), and is designed to operate on an 18-month refuelling cycle for economic competitiveness.

As a result of the success of the Hualong One project, no ACP-1000 reactors have been built to date. CNNC had originally planned to use the ACP-1000 in Fuqing reactor 5 and 6 but switched over to the Hualong One.

== Merger of ACP-1000 and ACPR-1000 into Hualong One ==
Since 2011, CNNC has been progressively merging its ACP-1000 nuclear power station design with the CGN ACPR-1000 design, while allowing some differences, under direction of the Chinese nuclear regulator. Both are three-loop designs originally based on the same French M310 design used in Daya Bay with 157 fuel assemblies, but went through different development processes (CNNC's ACP-1000 has a more domestic design with 177 fuel assemblies while CGN's ACPR-1000 is a closer copy with 157 fuel assemblies). In early 2014, it was announced that the merged design was moving from preliminary design to detailed design. Power output will be 1150 MWe, with a 60-year design life, and would use a combination of passive and active safety systems with a double containment. CNNC's 177 fuel assembly design was retained.

Initially the merged design was to be called the ACC-1000, but ultimately it was named Hualong One. In August 2014 the Chinese nuclear regulator review panel classified the design as a Generation III reactor design, with independently owned intellectual property rights. As a result of the success of the merger, ACP-1000 and ACPR-1000 designs are no longer being offered.

== See also ==
- CPR-1000 - Reactor design by the other state owned company China General Nuclear (CGN)
- Hualong One - Successor of the ACP-1000
