= Nuclear power in China =

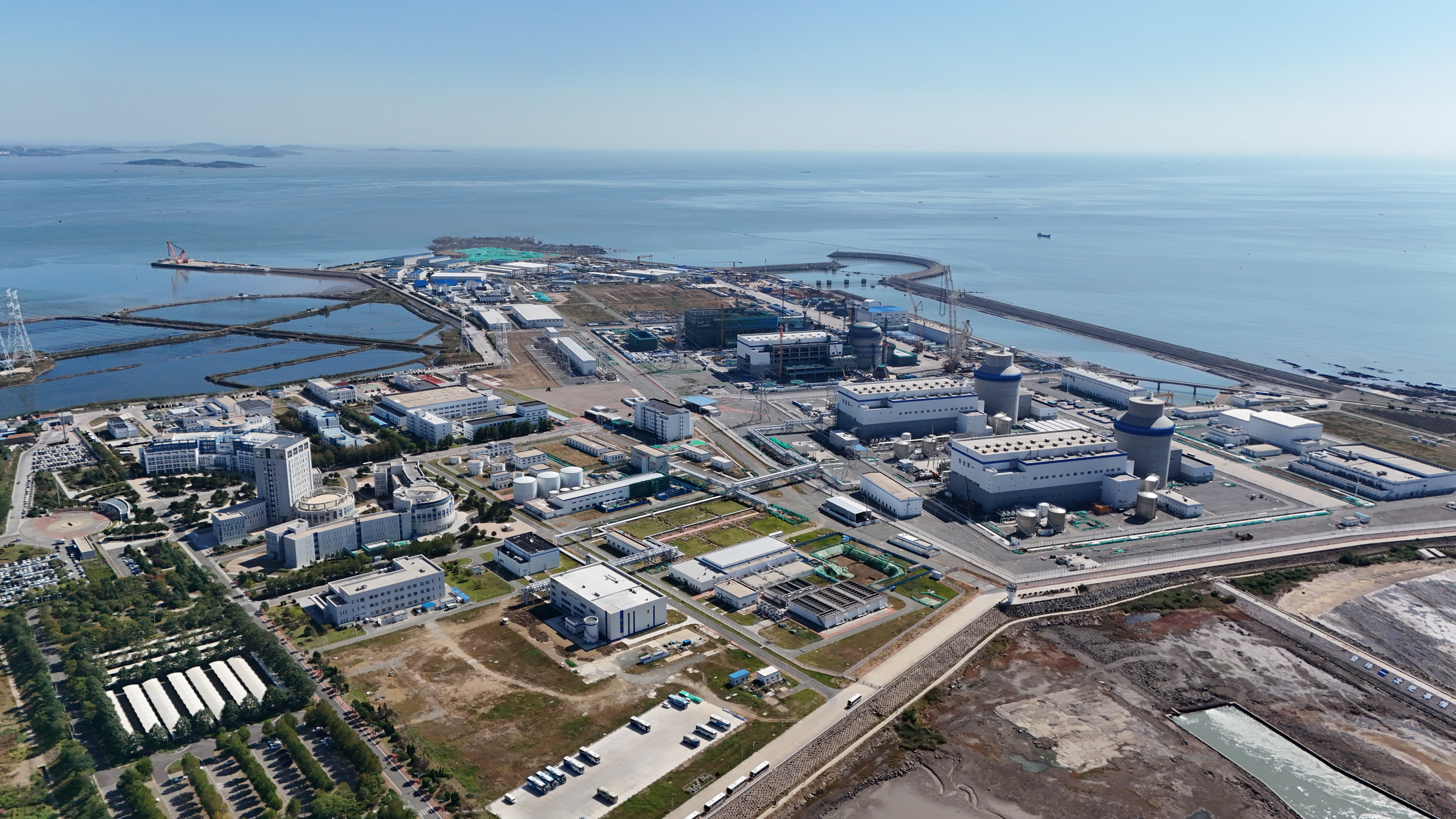
Aerial view of the Haiyang Nuclear Power Plant in Haiyang, Shandong; from far to near are Reactors 1 through 4

Nuclear energy generation in China (TWh)
Share of electricity generation produced by nuclear power in China (%)
Installed nuclear power in China (GW)
Share of installed power that is nuclear in China (%)

China operates the world's second-largest fleet of nuclear power plants, behind the United States. As of September 2026, 65 nuclear reactors with net capacity 63.409 gigawatts electrical (GWe) have been installed, compared to the US's 94 plants and 96.9 GWe. At the same time, there are over 38 reactors under construction with a total net capacity of 38 GWe, ranked first for the 18th consecutive year. 19 reactors (about 19 GWe) have been approved. In 2025, China's nuclear power generated 450 TWh of electricity, ranked second globally, accounting for 4.82% of the 2025 total energy production in China.

Nuclear power has been looked into as an alternative to coal due to increasing concerns about air quality, climate change and fossil fuel shortages. China aims to generate 200 GWe by 2035, produced by 150 additional reactors, at a cost of US$440 billion. China has two major nuclear power companies, the China National Nuclear Corporation operating mainly in northeast China, and the China General Nuclear Power Group operating mainly in southeast China.

China aims to maximize self-reliance on nuclear reactor technology manufacturing and design, although international cooperation and technology transfer are also encouraged. Advanced pressurized water reactors (PWR) such as the Hualong One, CAP-1000, Guohe One are the mainstream technology in the near future, and the Hualong One is also exported to Pakistan and will be exported to Kazakhstan. China plans to build as many as thirty nuclear power reactors in countries involved in the Belt and Road Initiative by 2030.

By 2050, fast neutron reactors are planned as the primary reactor type, with a planned 1400 GWe capacity by 2100, and with the CFR-600 China's Thorium Molten Salt Reactor project aims to utilize the thorium fuel cycle, including the TMSR-LF1 prototype operational since 2023. China is involved in the development of nuclear fusion reactors through its participation in the ITER project. It also conducts domestic research through facilities such as the EAST Tokamak in Hefei, as well as advance experimental projects including the Burning Plasma Experimental Superconducting Tokamak and the CFETR, which aim to develop DEMO-class reactors with power output exceeding >1 GW.

Nuclear research in China began during the 1950s, centered at the Institute of Atomic Energy, with assistance from the Soviet Union, and primarily to develop China's nuclear weapons. Following China's reform and opening up, the military nuclear industry shifted towards civilian power, with the first nuclear power plant, Qinshan-1, connecting to the grid in 1991. In the 21st century, China imported many gigawatt-class PWR reactor designs: the French EPR, Russian VVER-1000, and US AP1000.

== History ==
=== 1950–1958 ===
In the Cold War, Beijing's initial motivation for developing nuclear power was largely driven by security concerns. Between 1950 and 1958, Chinese nuclear power construction heavily relied on cooperation with the USSR. The first initiative was launched with the establishment of the China-Soviet Union Nonferrous Metals and Rare Metals Corporation and the first central atomic research facility, the Institute of Atomic Energy of the Chinese Academy of Sciences in Beijing. In February 1955, a chemical separation plant for the production of weapons-grade U-235 and plutonium was created with Soviet aid in Xinjiang and in April the Changchun Institute of Atomic Energy was established. Several months later, on 29 April 1955, the Sino-Soviet Atomic Cooperation Treaty was signed. The China National Nuclear Corporation (CNNC) was also established in 1955. In addition to cooperation with the USSR, China began to learn nuclear technology by sending students to the USSR. In December 1958, nuclear power development had become the top priority project in the Draft Twelve Year Plan for Development of Science and Technology.

=== 1959–1963 ===
The second phase was characterized by the goal of being completely self-sufficient in nuclear power development. In June 1959, the USSR officially ended any forms of nuclear aid to China, withdrawing Soviet technicians. China suffered but continued nuclear power development through massive research and input. In order to rapidly strengthen its atomic energy industry, the Central Committee decided that China must dedicate further resources exclusively to nuclear-related activities. Consequently, the Institute of Atomic Energy created branch institutes of research organizations in every province, major city, and autonomous region. By the end of 1963, China had built more than forty chemical separation plants for the extraction of uranium and thorium. In the year between 1961 and 1962, China accomplished significant achievements in nuclear development which consolidated future applications. From 1959 to 1963, Plant 504, a gaseous diffusion plant utilizing a large 300 MW reactor, was under construction at Lanzhou. It was estimated that the Chinese invested over $1.5 billion in the construction of this plant.

=== 1964 – 2012 ===
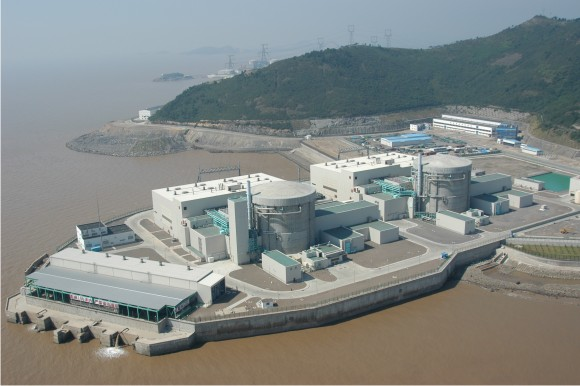
Qinshan Nuclear Power Plant, located in Zhejiang China

After the explosive progress in the 1950s, Chinese nuclear development slowed down, possibly because of the Cultural Revolution, so only one nuclear test took place in 1970. On 8 February 1970, China issued its first nuclear power plan, and the 728 Institute (now known as Shanghai Nuclear Engineering Research and Design Institute) was established.

Qinshan Nuclear Power Plant, constructed in 1984, was the first independently designed and built nuclear power plant. It was successfully connected to the grid on 15 December 1991. The reactor is of type CNP-300.

After the 1986 Chernobyl disaster, Beijing emphasized that it would not change its nuclear development policy, but would still explore a national emergency management strategy.

One year after Chernobyl, China began construction on the Daya Bay nuclear plant, located between Shenzhen and Hong Kong. Over 72% of Hong Kong residents surveyed opposed the plant, and more than one million residents signed a petition against the project. Despite this public protest, Beijing pushed forward with construction, with then-Minister of Nuclear Industry Jiang Xinxiong saying, "The government has not changed and will not change its decision to build a nuclear plant at Daya Bay," at a press conference in 1986.

In 1991, China created the National Nuclear Accident Emergency Committee to plan and coordinate nationwide nuclear accident emergency preparations and rescue operations.

Along with the reform and opening up, China continued to demand expansion of its electricity sector. As part of China's tenth Five-Year Plan (2001–2005), a key component of energy policy was to "guarantee energy security, optimize energy mix, improve energy efficiency, protect the ecological environment.” By 2002, China had two operational nuclear power plants.

In 2007, the Hu Jintao administration set the goal of doubling the amount of nuclear energy in China's total installed capacity, which resulted in the major growth of business opportunities in China's nuclear power sector.

Immediately after the 2011 Fukushima nuclear accident, Beijing froze all reactor approvals pending a safety review. By late 2012, the Chinese State Council approved the Nuclear Power Safety Plan and the Mid- and Long-Term Nuclear Development Plan, resuming reactor deployment as long as new projects met stricter Generation III safety standards.

In 2012, Hu emphasized "the irreplaceable role of nuclear energy in ensuring energy security and climate change".

=== 2013 – present ===
Net nuclear power capacity in China (2014-2024)
Year	gigawatts
2014	19.0
2015	26.8
2016	31.4
2017	34.5
2018	42.8
2019	45.5
2020	47.5
2021	50.0
2022	52.1
2023	53.2
2024	56.7
2025	62.219

The nuclear safety plan of 2013 stated that beyond 2016, only Generation III plants would be started, and until then only a very few Generation II+ plants would be started.

In 2014, China still planned to have 58 GW of capacity by 2020. However, due to reevaluation following the Fukushima Daiichi nuclear disaster in Japan, few plants commenced construction after 2015, and this target was not met.

In 2019, China had a new target of 200 GWe of nuclear generating capacity by 2035, which is 7.7% of the predicted total electricity generating capacity of 2600 GWe. By the end of December 2020, the total number of nuclear power units in operation in China reached 49, with a total installed capacity of 51 GWe, ranking third in the world in terms of installed capacity and second in the world in terms of power generation in 2020; with 16 nuclear power units under construction, the number of units under construction and installed capacity have ranked first in the world for many years. By 2035, nuclear power is planned to account for 10% of electricity generation.

As of 2020, China had 41 additional nuclear reactors planned and 168 proposed reactors under consideration. China's under-construction reactors accounted for 27% of worldwide reactors under construction. As of at least 2023, China's goals for nuclear power expansion are the most ambitious of any country.

Nuclear Power Capacity in China by Status
Data as of January 2026 — Gross electrical capacity (GW)

In 2021, China's Environmental Protection and Resources Conservation Committee announced an action plan which emphasized the deployment and development of next-generation nuclear power technology to reduce carbon dioxide emissions.

In 2024, the Information Technology and Innovation Foundation think tank stated that globally, China leads or matches in commercial nuclear power technology, and is likely 10 to 15 years ahead in Generation IV reactor technology.

Between 2015 and 2024, China built 37 reactors with an average time from first concrete to grid connection of 6.3 years (beating the global average of 9.4 years). China also recorded the fastest build time in that period at just 4.1 years.

As of 2025, China is the world's largest investor in nuclear energy, with 29 reactors currently under construction. This represents nearly half of all nuclear reactors being built globally. China is projected to surpass the United States as the world's leading producer of nuclear energy in the coming years. This expansion is consistent with the country's stated climate strategy. In terms of total prospective capacity, China leads with nearly 125 GWe in announced and under-construction projects, almost four times that of second-place Russia.

== Safety and regulation ==
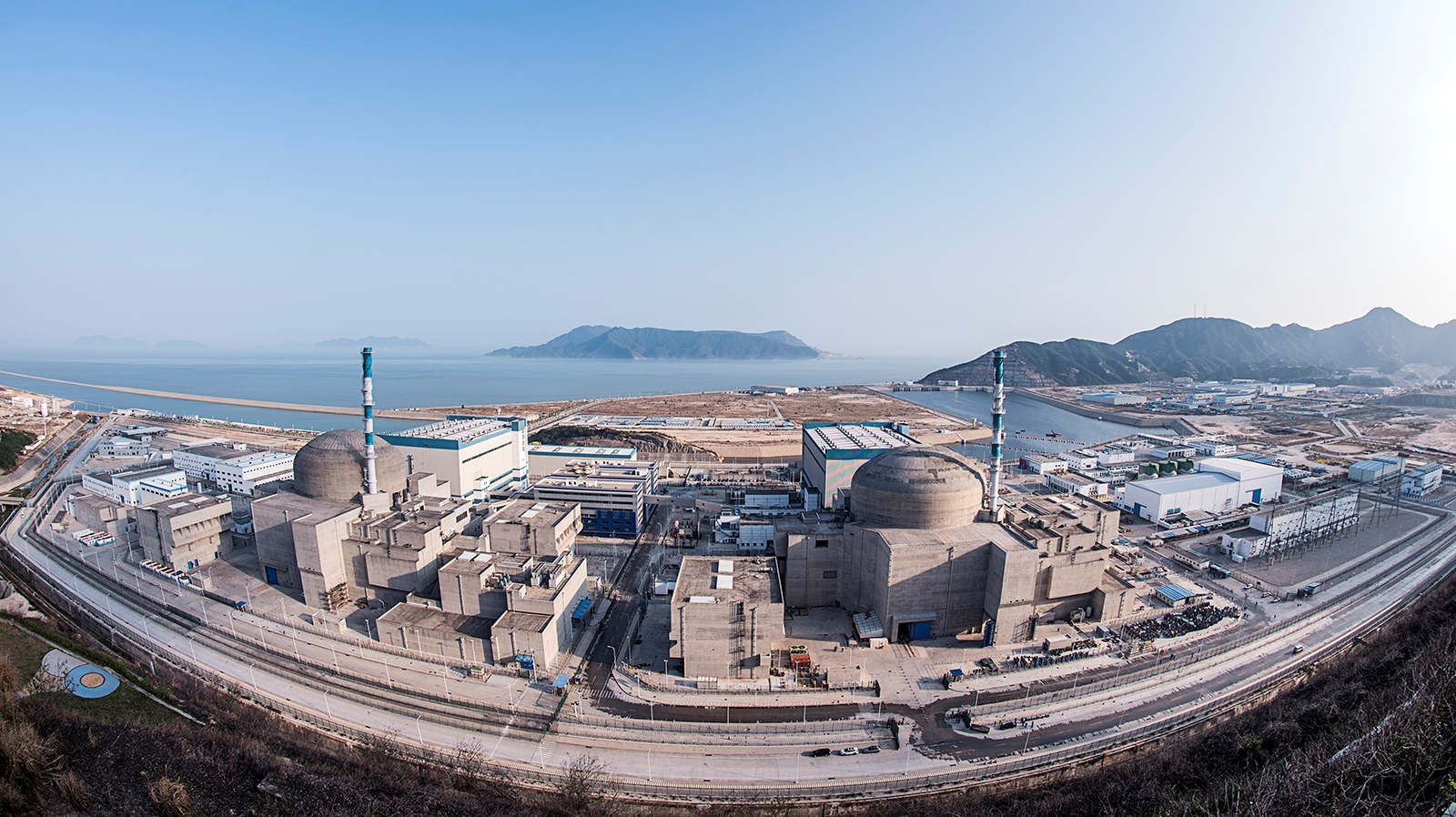
Taishan Nuclear Power Plant in Taishan, Guangdong; its units 1 & 2 are two 1750 MWe class EPR reactors

The National Nuclear Safety Administration (NNSA), under the China Atomic Energy Authority (CAEA), is the licensing and regulatory body which also maintains international agreements regarding safety. It was set up in 1984 and reports to the State Council directly. In relation to the AP1000, NNSA works closely with the US Nuclear Regulatory Commission. China has been a member of the International Atomic Energy Agency (IAEA) since 1984.

China has requested and hosted 12 Operational Safety Review Team (OSART) missions from IAEA teams as of October 2011, and each plant generally has one external safety review each year, either OSART, WANO peer review, or CNEA peer review (with the Research Institute for Nuclear Power Operations).

Following the Fukushima Daiichi nuclear disaster in Japan, China announced on 16 March 2011, that all nuclear plant approvals were being frozen, and that "full safety checks" of existing reactors would be conducted. Although Zhang Lijun, Vice Minister of Environmental Protection, has indicated that China's overall nuclear energy strategy would continue, some commentators have suggested that additional safety-related costs and public opinion could cause a rethink in favor of an expanded renewable energy program.

China's current methods for storing spent nuclear fuel (SNF) are only sustainable until the mid-2020s, and a policy to handle SNF needs to be developed.

In 2007, China's National Nuclear Safety Administration authorized three state-owned enterprises to own and operate nuclear power plants: the China National Nuclear Corporation, the China General Nuclear Power Group, and State Power Investment Corporation.

In 2017, new laws strengthened the powers of the National Nuclear Safety Administration, creating new "institutional mechanisms", a clearer "division of labour" and more disclosure of information.

IAEA Director General Rafael Grossi made his first official visit in May 2023, signing several agreements with China's nuclear regulator, the China Atomic Energy Authority. Grossi said "China is one of the IAEA’s most important partners and a global leader in nuclear energy".

== Reactor technologies ==
=== Imported technology ===
==== CANDU reactors ====
In 1998 construction of two AECL 728 MW CANDU-6 reactors at Qinshan Nuclear Power Plant started. The first went online in 2002, the second in 2003. CANDU reactors can use low-grade reprocessed uranium from conventional reactors as fuel, thereby reducing China's stockpile of spent nuclear fuel.

==== VVER ====
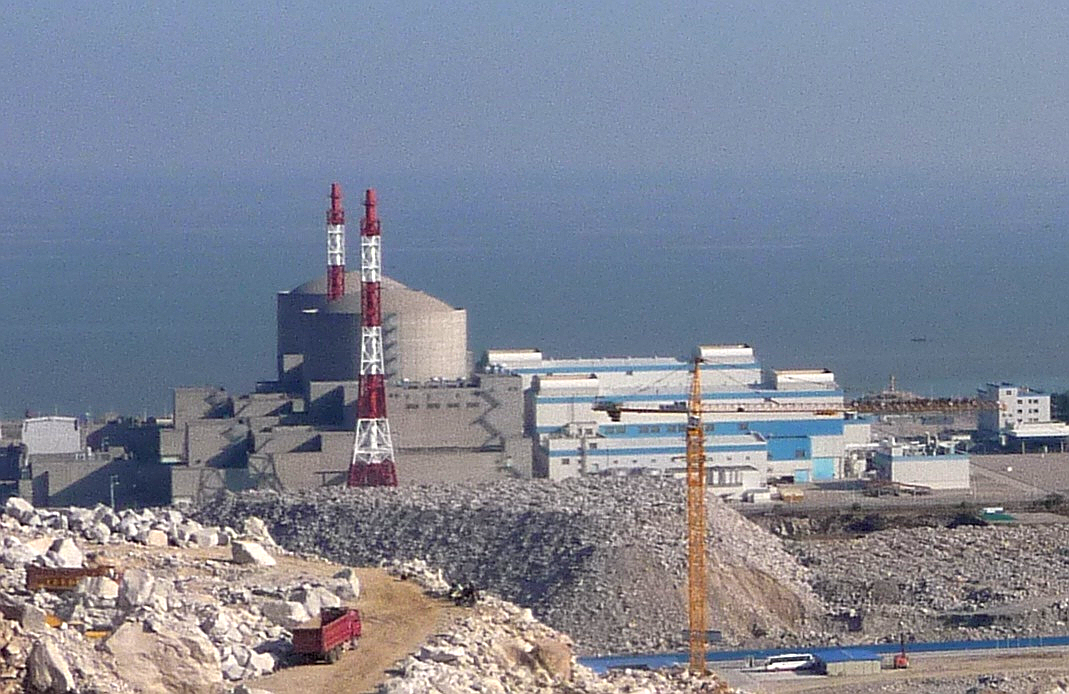
The first two VVER-1000 units at Tianwan Nuclear Power Plant

Russia's Atomstroyexport was the general contractor and equipment provider for the Tianwan AES-91 power plants using the V-428 version of the well-proven VVER-1000 reactor with a 1060 MWe capacity. Construction started in 1999. Two further Tianwan units started in 2012, using the same version of the VVER-1000 reactor.

On 7 March 2019, China National Nuclear Corporation (CNNC) and Atomstroyexport signed the detailed contract for the construction of four VVER-1200s, two each at the Tianwan Nuclear Power Plant and the Xudabao Nuclear Power Plant. Construction was scheduled to begin in May 2021, and commercial operation of all the units is expected between 2026 and 2028.

==== EPR ====
In 2007, negotiations began with the French company Areva concerning the EPR third-generation reactors. Two Areva 1660 MWe EPR reactors were built at Taishan, with construction starting in 2009.

==== AP1000 / CAP1000 ====
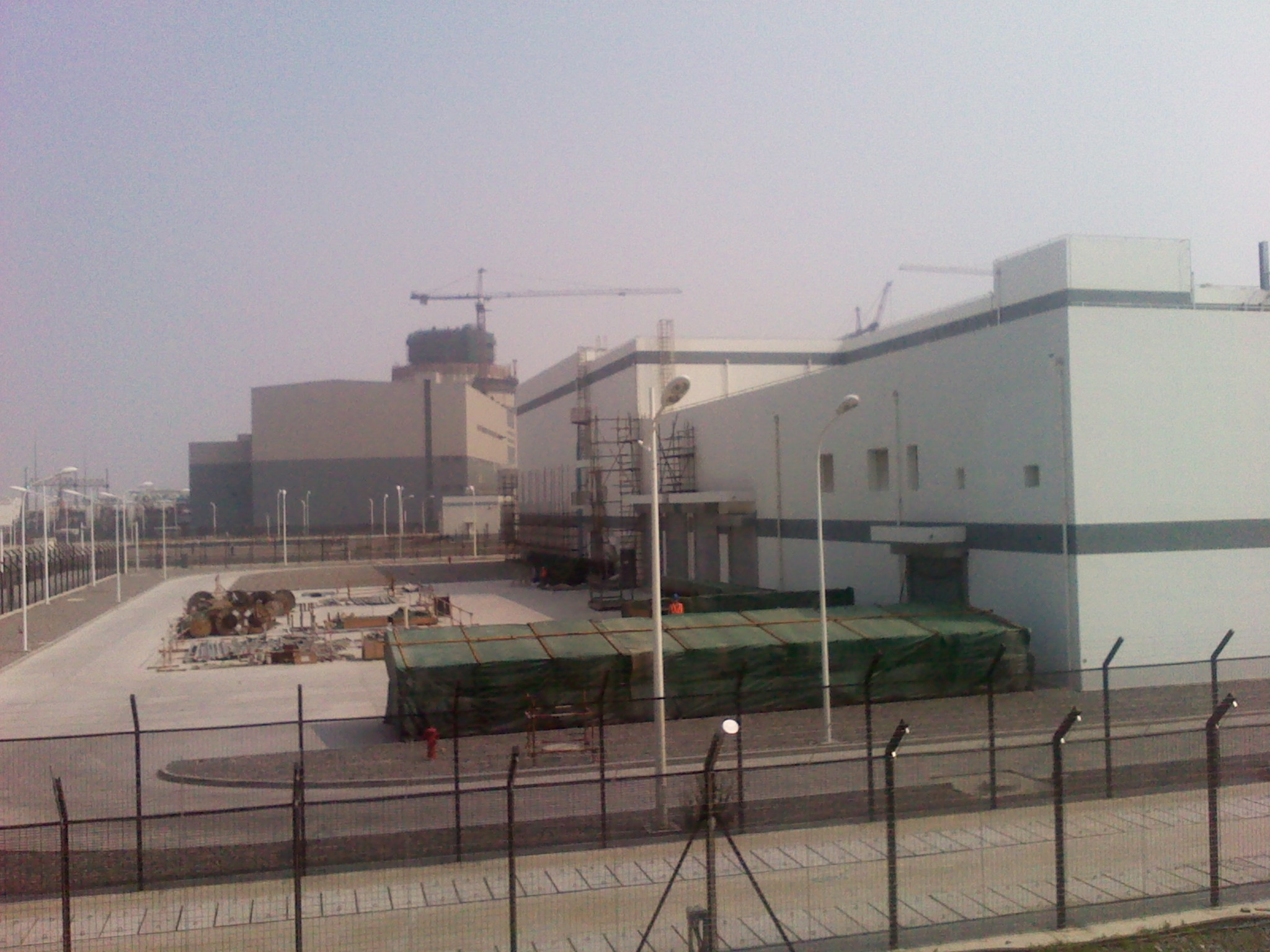
Sanmen Nuclear Power Station, located in Zhejiang, China

The Westinghouse AP1000 was planned to be the main basis of China's move to Generation III technology. In July 2018, the first of four AP1000 reactors was connected to the grid.

Following Westinghouse's bankruptcy in 2017, it was decided in 2019 to build the Hualong One rather than the AP1000 at Zhangzhou.

As of 2023, the construction of six CAP1000 was approved by the State Council: Haiyang 3 & 4, Lianjiang 1 & 2, and Sanmen 3 & 4. Construction of Sanmen 3 officially started in June 2022, and of Haiyang 3 in July 2022.

=== Chinese developments ===
==== CNP / ACP series ====
The CNP Generation II nuclear reactors (and Generation III successor ACP) were a series of nuclear reactors developed by China National Nuclear Corporation (CNNC), and are predecessors of the more current Hualong One design.

The CNP series of Generation II reactors started with the CNP-300 pressurized water reactor, which was the first reactor design developed domestically in China. The first unit began operation at Qinshan Nuclear Power Plant in 1991.

A larger version of the reactor, the CNP-600 was developed based on both the CNP-300 and the M310 reactor design used in Daya Bay Nuclear Power Plant. It was installed at Changjiang Nuclear Power Plant, with two units operational from 2015 and 2016, respectively. A Generation III ACP-600 successor was also developed, but none were built.

A three-loop, 1000-MW version of the CNP reactor, the CNP-1000, was under development since the 1990s with the help of vendors Westinghouse and Framatome (now AREVA). 4 units of the CNP-1000 were later built at Fuqing Nuclear Power Plant. Further work on the CNP-1000 was stopped in favour of the ACP-1000.

In 2013, China announced that it had independently developed the Generation III ACP-1000, with Chinese authorities claiming full intellectual property rights over the design. As a result of the success of the Hualong One project, no ACP-1000 reactors have been built to date. CNNC had originally planned to use the ACP-1000 in Fuqing reactors 5 and 6 but switched over to the Hualong One.

==== CPR-1000 / ACPR-1000 ====
The CPR-1000 was a Generation II reactor developed by China General Nuclear Power Group (CGN). It is the most numerous reactor type in China, with 22 units operational. This reactor type is a Chinese development of the French 900 MWe three cooling loop design imported in the 1990s, with most of the components now built in China. Intellectual property rights are retained by Areva, which affects CPR-1000 overseas sales potential.

China's first CPR-1000 nuclear power plant, Ling Ao-3, was connected to the grid on 15 July 2010. The design has been progressively built with increasing levels of Chinese components. Shu Guogang, GM of China Guangdong Nuclear Power Project, said, "We built 55 percent of Ling Ao Phase 2, 70 percent of Hongyanhe, 80 percent of Ningde and 90 percent of Yangjiang Station."

In 2010, the China Guangdong Nuclear Power Corporation announced the ACPR1000 design, a further design evolution of the CPR-1000 to a Generation III level, which would also replace components subject to intellectual-property restrictions. CGNPC aimed to be able to independently market the ACPR1000 for export by 2013. A number of ACPR1000 are under construction in China, but for export, this design was superseded by the Hualong One.

==== Hualong One ====
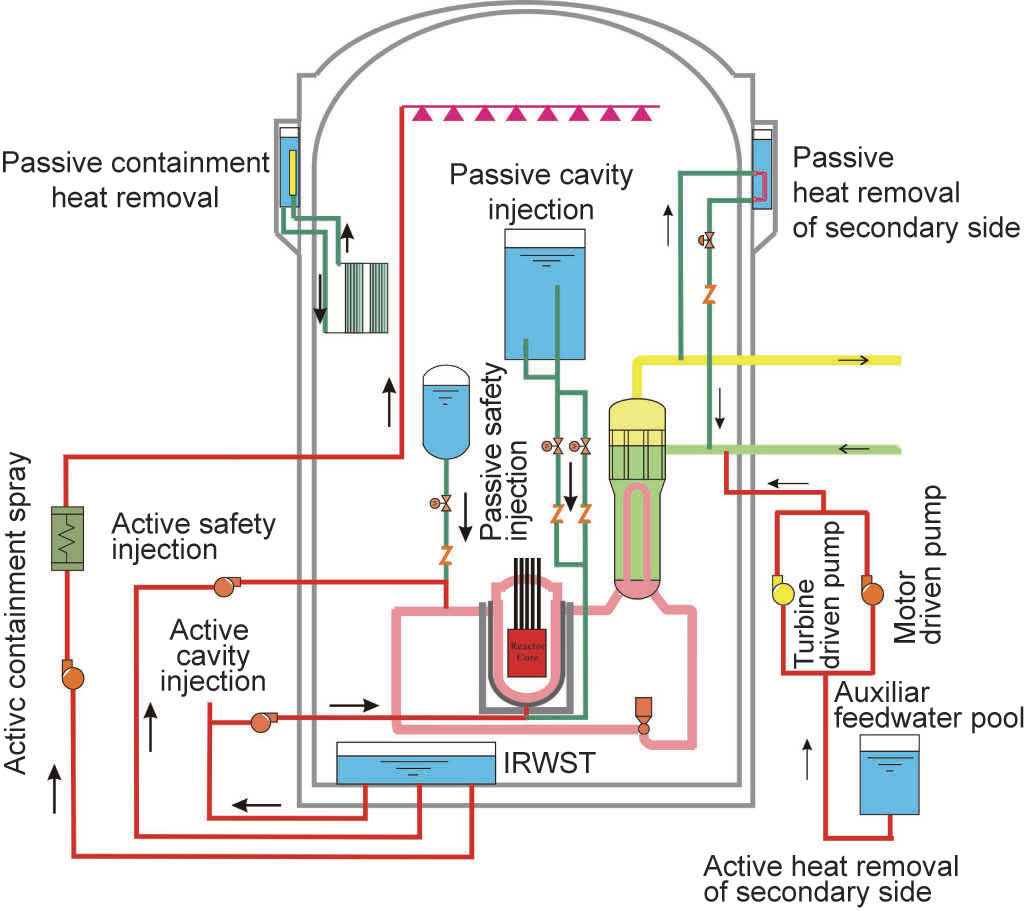
Active and passive cooling systems of the HPR1000 (Hualong One) Red line − active systems Green line − passive systems IRWST − in-containment refuelling water storage tank

Hualong One is jointly developed by the China National Nuclear Corporation (CNNC) and China General Nuclear Power Group (CGN), based on the three-loop ACP1000 of CNNC and ACPR1000 of CGN, which in turn are based on the French M310.

Since 2011, CNNC has been progressively merging its ACP-1000 nuclear power station design with the CGN ACPR-1000 design, while allowing some differences, under the direction of the Chinese nuclear regulator. Both are three-loop designs originally based on the same French M310 design used in Daya Bay with 157 fuel assemblies, but went through different development processes (CNNC's ACP-1000 has a more domestic design with 177 fuel assemblies, while CGN's ACPR-1000 is a closer copy with 157 fuel assemblies). In early 2014, it was announced that the merged design was transitioning from preliminary design to detailed design. Power output will be 1150 MWe, with a 60-year design life, and will use a combination of passive and active safety systems with a double containment. CNNC's 177 fuel assembly design was retained.

After the merger, both companies retain their own supply chain and their versions of the Hualong One will differ slightly (units built by CGN will retain some features from the ACPR1000) but the design is considered to be standardised. Some 85% of its components will be made domestically.

The Hualong One [also called the "HPR1000" internationally] power output will be 1170 MWe gross, 1090 MWe net, with a 60-year design life, and would use a combination of passive and active safety systems with a double containment. It has a 177 assembly core design with an 18-month refuelling cycle. The power plant's utilisation rate is as high as 90%. CNNC has said its active and passive safety systems, double-layer containment and other technologies meet the highest international safety standards.

The Hualong One is now largely seen as the replacement for all previous Chinese nuclear reactor designs, and has been exported overseas.

===== Hualong One v2.0 =====
CNNC plans to start building a follow-on version, named Hualong One v2.0, by 2024. It will be a more economical version using similar technology, reducing build time from 5 years to 4, and reducing costs by around a fourth from 17,000 yuan per kW to 13,000 yuan per kW. In 2026, China's State Council approved the construction of 4 Hualong One 2.0 units for Jinqimen (3 & 4), Taipingling (5 & 6).

==== CAP1400 (Guohe One) ====
In September 2020, China's State Power Investment Corporation launched a design based on the Westinghouse AP1000 for more widespread deployment consideration. It was given the name Guohe One.

As of 2026, the only two CAP-1400 reactor operation are in Shidaowan II-1&II-2. There are also plans for 4 additional CAP-1400 reactor in Bailong Unit 3-6.

In February 2019, the Shanghai Nuclear Engineering Research & Design Institute announced that it had begun the conceptual design process for the CAP1700.

The CAP1400 project may extend to a larger, three-loop CAP-2100 design if the passive cooling system can be scaled to that level.

==== Generation IV reactors ====
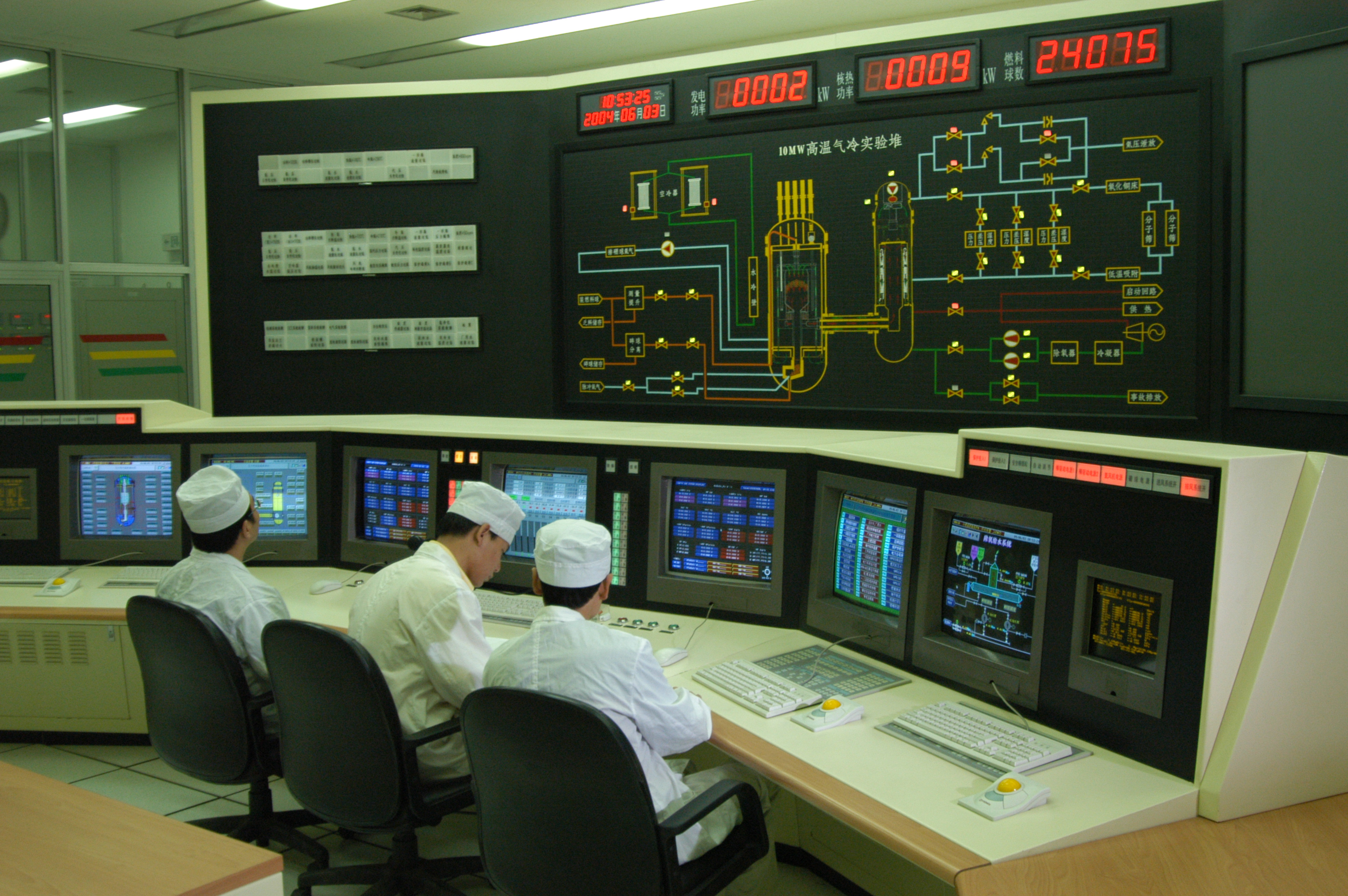
Control room of HTR-10 reactor at Tsinghua University

China is developing several generation IV reactor designs.

===== HTR-PM (high-temperature gas-cooled reactor) =====
In December 2023, China’s HTR-PM, a high-temperature gas-cooled reactor at Shidao Bay, entered commercial operation. HTR-PM is a small modular reactor which connects two helium-cooled reactor modules to a single steam turbine, outputting energy and super-heated steam. These reactors are inherently safe as they demonstrate “walk-away” behavior. Emergency tests conducted in proved the reactors could cool down naturally without human intervention or backup core-cooling systems. This was the first successful demonstration of this inherent-safety behavior in a commercial reactor. In 2024, the state energy firm Huaneng connected HTR-PM to a local steam heating network, replacing ~3,700 tonnes of coal per heating season.

The HTR-PM is a descendant of the AVR reactor, and it is partly based on the earlier Chinese HTR-10 reactor.

===== CFR-600 (sodium-cooled fast reactor) =====
At 17:00 on December 15, 2014, China's first sodium-cooled fast-neutron reactor—the China Experimental Fast Reactor (CEFR)—reached 100% power for the first time. By 17:00 on December 18, it had successfully completed 72 hours of stable operation at full power, marking the point at which its key process parameters and safety performance indicators met design requirements. Regarding the commercial application of sodium-cooled fast-neutron reactors, the CFR-600 unit—China's demonstration fast reactor—is currently under construction at the Xiapu Nuclear Power Plant.

===== Thorium-based Molten Salt Reactor =====
The Thorium-based Molten Salt experimental Reactor TMSR-LF1 located in Wuwei, Gansu, was originally scheduled to commence trial operations at the end of September 2021; it represents a form of thorium-fueled power generation. On August 2, 2022, the Ministry of Ecology and Environment of the PRC issued a public notice titled "Notice on Approving the "Commissioning Outline for the 2 MWt Liquid-Fueled Thorium-Based Molten Salt Experimental Reactor" (Version 1.3)." This notice indicated that the reactor was currently in its commissioning phase].

==== ACP100 small modular reactor ====
In July 2019, China National Nuclear Corporation announced it would start building a demonstration ACP100 small modular reactor (SMR) on the north-west side of the existing Changjiang Nuclear Power Plant by the end of the year. Design of the ACP100 started in 2010 and it was the first SMR project to pass an independent safety assessment by International Atomic Energy Agency in 2016. It is also referred to as Linglong One and is a fully integrated reactor module with an internal coolant system, with a 2-year refuelling interval, producing 385 MWt and about 125 MWe, and incorporates passive safety features, and can be installed underground.

== Nuclear power plants ==
Nuclear power plants in China (view)
Active plants
Under construction plants
Firmly planned plants

The relative lack of water available for cooling reactors west of the Heihe–Tengchong Line (the area shown in yellow) is seen as a limiting factor for the development of traditional forms of nuclear power there.

Most nuclear power plants in China are located on the coast and generally use seawater for cooling in a direct once-through cycle. In 2009, The New York Times reported that China was placing many of its nuclear plants near large cities, and there was a concern that tens of millions of people could be exposed to radiation in the event of an accident. China's neighboring Daya Bay and Lingao nuclear plants have around 28 million people within a 75-kilometre radius that covers Hong Kong.

=== Future projects ===
Following the Fukushima accident and consequent pause in approvals for new plants, the target adopted by the State Council in October 2012 became 60 GWe by 2020, with 30 GWe under construction. In 2015, the target for nuclear capacity on line in 2030 was 150 GWe, providing almost 10% of electricity, and 240 GWe in 2050 providing 15%.

However, from 2016 to 2018, there was a further hiatus in the new build programme, with no new approvals for at least two years, causing the programme to slow sharply. Delays in the Chinese builds of AP1000 and EPR reactors, together with the bankruptcy in the U.S. of Westinghouse, the designer of the AP1000, have created uncertainties about the future direction. Also, some regions of China now have excess generation capacity, and it has become less certain to what extent electricity prices can economically sustain nuclear new build while the Chinese government is gradually liberalising the generation sector.

In 2018, a Nuclear Engineering International journal analysis suggests a below-plan capacity of 90 GWe is plausible for 2030. As of 2025, China had 68 GW of operational nuclear power, with 34 GW under construction, and 147 proposed. (see Table below)

Bloomberg News reported that the 2020 National People's Congress supported future building of 6 to 8 reactors a year, which Bloomberg considered likely to be dominated by the domestic Hualong One design. In 2019, China had a new target of 200 GWe of nuclear generating capacity by 2035, which is 7.7% out of predicted total electricity generating capacity of 2600 GWe.

=== The role of the IPPs ===
The first major successful profitable commercial project was the Daya Bay Nuclear Plant, which is 25% owned by CLP Group of Hong Kong and exports 70% of its electricity to Hong Kong. Such imports supply 20% of Hong Kong's electricity.

In order to access the capital needed to meet the 2020 target of 80GW, China has begun to grant equity in nuclear projects to China's Big Five power corporations:

- Huaneng Group,
- Huadian Group – Fujian Fuqing nuclear power project II and III
- Datang Group,
- China Power Investment Group – Jiangxi Pengze Nuclear
- Guodian Group

Like the two nuclear companies China National Nuclear Corporation and China Guangdong Nuclear Power Group (CGNPG) the Big Five are State-owned "Central Enterprises" (中央企业) administered by SASAC. However, unlike the two nuclear companies, they have listed subsidiaries in Hong Kong and a broad portfolio of thermal, hydro and wind.

=== Summary of nuclear power plants ===
Summary table of nuclear power plants in China
Nuclear power plant	operational reactors		reactors under construction		reactors approved		total	
Nuclear power plant	units	net capacity (MW)	units	net capacity (MW)	units	net capacity (MW)	units	net capacity (MW)
Bailong	—		2	2,200	—		2	2,200
Changjiang	3	2,202	2	1,400	—		5	3,602
Daya Bay (Dayawan)	2	1,888	—		—		2	1,888
Fangchenggang	4	4,000	1	1,100	1	1,100	6	6,200
Fangjiashan	2	2,024	—		—		2	2,024
Fuqing	6	6,000	—		—		6	6,000
Haiyang	2	2,300	2	2,200	2	2,200	6	6,700
Hongyanhe	6	6,366	—		—		6	6,366
Jinqimen	—		2	2,314	2	2,314	4	4,628
Laiyang	—		2	3,000	—		2	3,000
Lianjiang	—		2	2,448	4	4,640	6	7,088
Ling Ao	4	3,914	—		—		4	3,914
Lufeng (Shanwei)	—		4	4,400	—		4	4,400
Ningde	4	4,072	2	2,036	—		6	6,108
Qinshan	7	4,198	—		—		7	4,110
San'ao	1	1,126	3	3,378	—		4	4,504
Sanmen	2	2,314	2	2,326	2	2,000	6	6,640
Shidao Bay (Shidaowan)	3	3200	2	2268	—		5	5468
Taishan	2	3,320	—		—		2	3,320
Taipingling	2	2,232	2	2,232	2	2,232	6	6,696
Tianwan	6	6,080	2	2,200	—		8	8,280
Xiapu	—		2	1,000	2	2,032	4	3,032
Xudabao	—		4	4,400	—		4	4,400
Xuwei	—		2	2,200	—		2	2200
Yangjiang	6	6,120	—		—		6	6,120
Zhaoyuan	—		2	2,424	—		2	2,424
Zhangzhou	2	2,424	2	2,424	2	2,200	6	6,600
Zhuanghe	—		—		2	2,200	6	6,600
Total	64	63,409	39	41,100	24	25,100	131	141,108

Where multiple reactors are operational/under construction/planned at a given site, the capacity given is to be understood for all reactors at this site applicable to the given column, not a per reactor figure.

== Fuel cycle ==
China is evaluating the construction of a high level waste (HLW) repository in the Gobi Desert, probably constructed near Beishan starting around 2041.

Starting in about the 2010s, China has been making serious efforts towards nuclear reprocessing. While those plants are ostensibly civilian in nature, there is concern as to the Dual Use applicability of the technology with media articles headlined "China nuclear reprocessing to create stockpiles of weapons-level materials: Experts" China has also pioneered the use of a reprocessed uranium / depleted uranium mixture "natural uranium equivalent" in its Pressurized Heavy Water Reactors at Qinshan Nuclear Power Plant. Unlike the similar "DUPIC" process ("direct use of spent PWR fuel in CANDU") pioneered in South Korea, this process separately recovers the reactor grade plutonium for other uses, fueling the heavy water reactor with the uranium content of the spent fuel alone.

== Companies ==
China's domestic market for uranium is highly concentrated because Chinese policy identifies uranium as a strategic resource and only select companies are authorized to mine it. The country's civilian nuclear industry and its mining industry are largely concentrated in China General Nuclear Power Group and China National Nuclear Corporation, two state-owned enterprise that report to the State Council.

China National Nuclear Corporation was founded in 1988 as a state-owned enterprise supervised by the State-owned Assets Supervision and Administration Commission (SASAC), and was constituted from the former Ministry of Nuclear Industry. It is the only exporter of Chinese nuclear power plants.

China General Nuclear Power Group was founded in 1994 as the China Guangdong Nuclear Power Group and changed to its current name in 2013. It is also supervised by SASAC. Its headquarters are in Shenzhen. As of 2017, China General Nuclear Power Group manages 20 reactors.

- State Nuclear Power Technology Corporation
- China Nuclear International Uranium Corporation

== Research ==
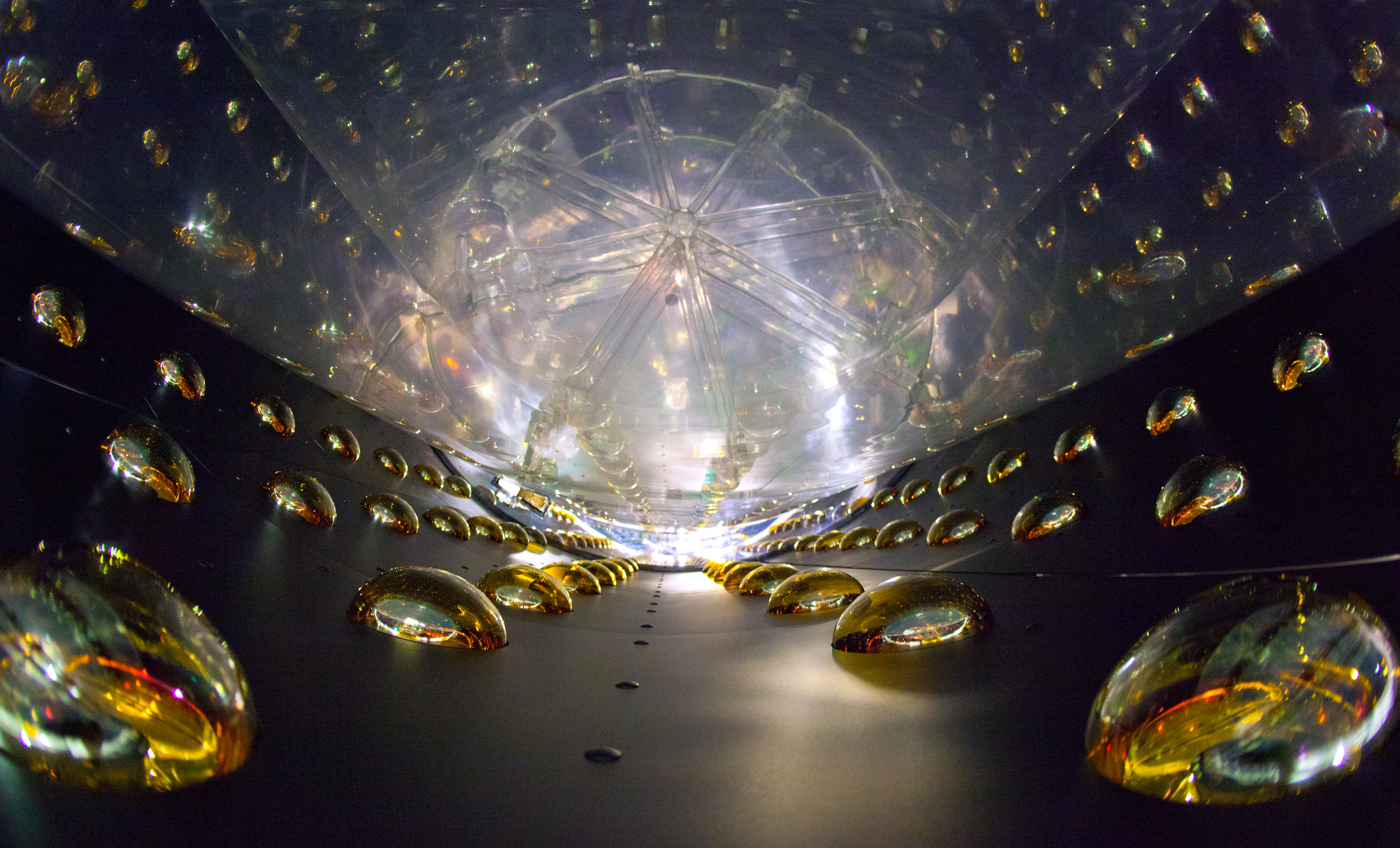
Daya Bay Reactor Neutrino Experiment

In January 2011, the Chinese Academy of Sciences began the TMSR research and development project to create reactors which, among other advances, will be air-cooled. A small prototype reactor of this type, the TMSR-LF1, was planned to be sited in Gansu province, in an industrial park in Minqin County. A ten-year operating license was issued in June 2023. Criticality was first achieved in October of that same year. In June 2024, full power (2MW_{t}) operation was achieved, and in October, it operated at full power for 10 days with thorium in the molten salt; Protactinium-233 was detected, indicating successful nuclear breeding.

In February 2019, China's State Power Investment Corporation (SPIC) signed a cooperation agreement with the Baishan municipal government in Jilin province for the Baishan Nuclear Energy Heating Demonstration Project, which would use a China National Nuclear Corporation DHR-400 (District Heating Reactor 400 MWt).

== Public opposition ==
China experienced civil protests over its ambitious plans to build more nuclear power plants following the Fukushima nuclear disaster. There has been an "inter-provincial squabble" over a nuclear power plant being built near the southern bank of the Yangtze River. The plant in the centre of the controversy is located in Pengze county in Jiangxi, and across the river the government of Wangjiang county in Anhui wants the project shelved.

More than 1,000 people protested in Jiangmen City Hall in July 2013 to demand that authorities abandon a planned uranium-processing facility that was designed as a major supplier to nuclear power stations. The Heshan Nuclear Power Industry Park was to be equipped with facilities for uranium conversion and enrichment as well as the manufacturing of fuel pellets, rods and finished assemblies. Protesters feared the plant would adversely affect their health, and the health of future generations. As the weekend protest continued, Chinese officials announced the state-run project's cancellation.

By 2014, concerns about public opposition caused Chinese regulators to develop public and media support programmes, and developers to begin outreach programmes including site tours and visitor centres.

In 2020, Bloomberg News reported that public opposition had stopped nuclear power construction on inland river sites, and caused the cancellation of a nuclear fuel plant in Guangdong in 2013.

== See also ==
- Electricity sector in China
- Energy policy of China
- List of commercial nuclear reactors § China
- Nuclear power by country
- Nuclear energy policy
- Strategic uranium reserves

Nuclear Capacity (GW_{e})
Year	USA	France	China
2018	99	63	43
2019	98	63	46
2020	97	61	47
2021	96	61	50
2022	95	61	52
2023	96	61	53
2024	97	61	54
2025	97	63	59

Nuclear Generation (TWh)
Year	USA	France	China
2017	805	379	247
2018	807	393	287
2019	809	382	330
2020	790	380	366
2021	787	361	407
2022	772	279	418
2023	775	320	433
2024	782	362	451
