= CNP-600 =

The CNP-600 is a pressurized water nuclear reactor developed by the China National Nuclear Corporation (CNNC).

The CNP-600 is a generation II reactor based both on China's first commercial domestic nuclear reactor design, the CNP-300 and the M310 reactor design used in Daya Bay Nuclear Power Plant.

The reactor has a capacity of 650 MW, a 2-loop design and 121 fuel assemblies. Other features include single containment, 40-year design life and a 12-month fuel cycle.

The first CNP-600 unit began operation at Qinshan Nuclear Power Plant in 2002, with other 3 units coming online between 2004 and 2011. There have been built two further CNP-600 reactors at Changjiang Nuclear Power Plant, which went into regular operation in 2015 and 2016.

A larger version of the design, the CNP-1000 with three loops, has been developed by the CNNC. The new design will have improved safety systems and an extended design life of 60 years.

== See also ==
- CNP / ACP nuclear reactors
- Nuclear power in China
