= Chashma Nuclear Power Complex =

Nuclear power plant in Pakistan

Chashma Nuclear Power Plant
- Official name: Chashma Nuclear Power Complex
- Country: Pakistan
- Location: Chashma, Mianwali, Punjab
- Coordinates: 32°23′25″N 71°27′45″E
- Status: Operational
- Construction began: C1: 1 August 1993; C2: 27 December 2005; C3: 28 April 2011; C4: 18 December 2011; C5: 14 July 2023
- Commission date: C1: 14 September 2000; C2: 17 May 2011; C3: 6 December 2016; C4: 19 September 2017
- Construction cost: C1: US$900 million (1993); C2: US$860 million C3 & C4: US$2.37 billion C5: US$4.8 billion
- Owner: Government of Pakistan
- Operators: Pakistan Atomic Energy Commission (Reactor management); China–Pakistan Power Corp. (Site and energy management)

Nuclear power station
- Reactors: 4 (operational); 1 (under construction)
- Reactor type: Pressurized Water Reactor (PWR)
- Reactor supplier: Pakistan Nuclear Fuel Complex; China National Nuclear Corp.
- Cooling source: Indus River

Power generation
- Units operational: C1: 325 MW; C2: 325 MW; C3: 340 MW; C4: 340 MW
- Make and model: C1-C4: CNP-300; C5: Hualong One
- Units under const.: C5: 1200 MW
- Nameplate capacity: 1,330 MW (operational); 2,530 MW (planned)
- Capacity factor: 90.3% (lifetime)

External links
- Website: Chashma Nuclear Power Plant

The Chashma Nuclear Power Plant (or CHASNUPP) is a large commercial nuclear power plant located at Chashma in Mianwali, Punjab, Pakistan.

Officially known as Chashma Nuclear Power Complex, the nuclear power plant is generating energy for industrial usage with four nuclear reactors with a fifth under construction with China's collaboration. The energy site is covered under the International Atomic Energy Agency (IAEA) monitoring and safeguards which also provide funding for the site expansion. Planning for the Chashma Nuclear Power Plant took place in collaboration with France in 1973 but the site was completed with China joining the project, and later providing the reactor in 1993.

With growing demands of energy that was recognized in November 2006, the IAEA approved an agreement with Pakistan for new nuclear power plants to be built in the country with Chinese assistance when its Board of Governors of unanimously approved the safeguards agreement for any future Nuclear Power Plants that Pakistan will be constructing.

== History ==
Planning and design phase of the Chashma Nuclear Power Plant began in 1973–75 by the Pakistan Atomic Energy Commission (PAEC), with its chairman, Munir Ahmad Khan, selecting the Chashma Lake as its potential site. In 1974, Bhutto administration entered in negotiation over the supply of the nuclear power plant with France, presenting the initial design by the Pakistan Atomic Energy Commission, and signed a contract with France's Commissariat à l'énergie atomique (CEA) to provide funding of the nuclear power plant and a separate plutonium production facility in Khushab.

Negotiations over the supply of commercial nuclear power plant became controversial and further complicated after India's nuclear test, 'Smiling Buddha', conducted in 1974. In February 1976, the French government began expressing increased concern over the export of nuclear technology, and the Bhutto administration eventually proposed signing a safeguard agreement that would place the nuclear power plant under the supervision of the International Atomic Energy Agency (IAEA). The French government agreed on this proposal and eventually signed a safeguard agreement with Bhutto administration on 18 March 1976.

Despite the IAEA safeguard agreement and Zia administration's asking of CEA to fulfill the Chashma contract, France eventually halted the funding and ejected from the project in 1978.

In 1980, Pakistan discussed funding of the nuclear power plant with China, and Pakistan begin the construction of the nuclear power plant in 1982–83. This 900 MW nuclear power plant received US$1.2 Bn funding from the Zia administration to lessen the dependence on energy infrastructure depended on Saudi oil aid and oil imports from UAE. In 1984–85, Pakistan reached out to Soviet Union over the funding of the project which the Russians were receptive of the offer but decided against participating in the project.

In 1986, Pakistan eventually entered in understanding with China when it signed an agreement on peaceful usage of commercial nuclear power technology. In 1989, China announced to sell of the reactor but the nuclear power plant did not operationalise due the PAEC scientists and engineers, who eventually designed the reactor based on CNP-300 in China, and had to conduct several lengthy testing and pass PAEC required regulation phases, since China did not have the experience to sustain such a large and highly complex project— the experience Pakistan learned from running the Karachi Nuclear Power Plant.

In 1990, the discussion over the funding of nuclear power plant was again held with France, which the French government agreed upon supplying a nuclear power reactor but later decided against it due to financial funding. In 1992, Pakistan eventually signed an agreement with China and construction of the nuclear power plant site begin in 1993 with China and Pakistan financing US$900 Mn for this project.

In 2000, the Chashma Nuclear Power Plant became operational when it joined the nation's grid system with China National Nuclear Corporation overseeing the grid connections of the power plant. In 2004, the China National Nuclear Corporation was awarded contract for building a second unit based on the first reactor, followed by contracting for two more reactors in 2011.

== Reactor technology ==
=== C1 and C2 ===
The first reactor unit, C1, is a 300-MW two-loop pressurized water reactor (PWR), using between 2.4 and 3.0% low-enriched uranium (LEU) fuel. Its design is based on the Chinese CNP-300 reactor with PAEC scientists and engineers designed in China with their nation's standards and regulations. It is the first Chinese export of a nuclear power plant. The reactor has a thermal capacity of 999 MW and a gross electrical capacity of 325 MW, with a net output of about 300 MW. Since its commissioning in 2000, the reactor has been kept at 90.3% capacity factor, generating 2,335.5 GW-h of electricity as of 2019. The first reactor unit went on critical phase on 2 May 2000 and joined the nation's electricity grid system on 12 June 2000; it commenced its official operations on 14 September 2000.

After the first reactor unit, the Pakistan Nuclear Regulatory Authority (PNRA) refrained the PAEC to start working on the second unit right away because the agency wanted to monitor the nuclear reactor for its safety and performances for at least 3-years— first year and half for nominal power and rest of the time at full power as this is the most critical phase.

In May 2004, the Nuclear Regulatory Authority allowed the Pakistan Atomic Energy Commission to sign the contract with the China National Nuclear Corporation (CNNC) to start the work on the second reactor, CHASNUPP-II, which would be modeled as similar to CHASNUPP-I design. The construction of the second unit start on 27 December 2005 and achieved its critical phase on 21 February 2011. The CHASNUPP-IIjoined the nation's electricity grid system on 13 March 2011 and commenced its official operations on 17 May 2011.

The second unit, C2, is also a CNP-300 reactor with nominal difference of generating a gross electrical capacity of 325 MWe with a net output of about 300 MW. The reactor was designed and built in Pakistan with local industry's participation. Pakistani administration eventually financed the commercial nuclear power plant for industrial usage and reportedly contracted Chinese National Nuclear Corp. for overseeing the second unit to be installed, which was officially inaugurated on 10 May 2011 by former Prime Minister Yousaf Raza Gillani. The Pakistani government provided finance of US$860 Mn, with Chinese banks loaning the nation US$350 Mn.

=== C3 and C4 ===
On 28 April 2009, a general engineering and design contract for third and fourth units were signed with Shanghai Nuclear Engineering Research and Design Institute at the cost of US$2.37 Bn. Construction of CHASNUPP-III, or C3, begin on 28 May 2011 and it went on its critical phase on 1 August 2016. The CHASNUPP-III joined the nation's electricity grid system on 15 October 2016 and commenced its operations on 6 December 2016. The CHASNUPP-III is a 315-MW two-loop pressurized water reactor (PWR), using between 2.4 and 3.0% low-enriched uranium (LEU) fuel with a gross capacity of 340 MW.

The CHASNUPP-IV, or C4, is also a CNP-300 type and is a 315-MW two-loop pressurized reactor with a gross capacity of 340 MW. Construction of the fourth reactor started on 18 December 2011 and it went critical on 15 March 2017. The CHASNUPP-IV was connected to nation's grid system on 25 June 2017, and commenced its operations on 19 September 2017.

=== C5 ===
In March 2013, Pakistan and China agreed to build a fifth unit at the Chashma nuclear power plant site, eventually signing an agreement on 27 November 2017. The CHASNUPP-V, or C5, will be a Hualong One reactor. The China National Nuclear Corporation and the Pakistan Atomic Energy Commission had signed a cooperation agreement for the construction of a 1,200 MW Hualong One nuclear reactor at the Chashma nuclear power plant in Punjab province in Pakistan, named C5.

On 14 July 2023, Prime Minister of Pakistan Shahbaz Sharif performed the groundbreaking ceremony of the 1,200 MW Chashma Nuclear Power Plant Unit 5 (C-5). This significant project is expected to be completed within a span of seven to eight years, with an estimated cost of approximately $4.8 billion. First concrete for Unit 5 was poured on 30 December 2024.

On 16 November 2026, a dome was installed in the reactor building of C5 with a target month and year to commence electricity generation in September 2030.

== Corporate management ==
The Chashma Nuclear Power Plant site is owned by the Pakistan Atomic Energy Commission (PAEC) and is subjected to safeguards and monitoring provided under the International Atomic Energy Agency and enforced by the Nuclear Regulatory Authority. The China-Pakistan Power Plant Corp. is an energy contractor that manages the on site operations of the nuclear power plant on behalf of Nuclear Regulatory Authority. The Pakistan Atomic Energy Commission has the responsibility of running the overall operations of the nuclear power plant including computerized machinery, plant stimulators, and manufacturing of fuel bundles, producing fuel cycle, manufacturing tools, and employing of computers.

== Training opportunities ==
Since 2000, the Chashma Nuclear Power Plant offers training programs and certification in engineering and health physics. Its training centre is known as "CHASNUPP Centre of Nuclear Training" (or CHASCENT) offers a one-year postgraduate training program in engineering and a one-year post-diploma training program in health physics. The facility is equipped with a full-scope training simulator, laboratories, a library, a physical models house, and an auditorium.

The simulator is used for providing training to the nuclear power plant operators. Apart from training nuclear plant operators the centre offers various engineering programs at diploma and degree levels.

== See also ==
- Nuclear power in Pakistan
- Nuclear power in China
- Pakistan Atomic Energy Commission
- China Atomic Energy Authority
- China National Nuclear Corporation
