= Taipingling Nuclear Power Plant =

Proposed nuclear power plant in Guangdong, China

- Country: People's Republic of China
- Location: Huangbu, Huidong, Guangdong
- Coordinates: 22°41′40″N 114°59′00″E
- Status: Operational
- Construction began: 2019
- Construction cost: US$12.1 billion
- Owner: CGN Huizhou Nuclear Power
- Operator: CGN Huizhou Nuclear Power

Nuclear power station
- Reactor type: Hualong One PWR

Power generation
- Units operational: 2 × 1116 MWe
- Units planned: 2 × 1116 MWe
- Units under const.: 2 × 1116 MWe

The Taipingling Nuclear Power Plant is a nuclear power station under construction in Huangbu Town, Huidong County, Huizhou city on the coast of Guangdong Province, in southeast China. The plant is owned by CGN Huizhou Nuclear Power Co. CGN originally planned to have AP1000 light water reactors, but later changed plans to the Hualong One design.

Approval for the plant was granted in February 2019 and first concrete for Unit 1 was poured in December 2019. Unit 1 began commercial operation in April 2026.

Approval for units 3 and 4 was granted in December 2023. First concrete for Unit 3 was poured in June 2025.

On May 3, 2026, Unit 2 successfully completed its first fuel loading, and officially entering the nuclear commissioning phase, and connected to grid on July 4, 2026., began commercial operation in August 3, 2026.

In August 2026, China's State Council approved the construction of 4 Hualong One & two Huanlong One 2.0 units for Jinqimen (3 & 4), Taipingling (5 & 6), and Zhuanghe (1 & 2)

== Reactor data ==
Unit	Type	Net Capacity MWe	Gross Capacity MWe	Construction start	First criticality	Grid connection	Operation start	Notes
Phase I
1	Hualong One	1116	1200	2019-12-26	2026-02-03	2026-02-13	2026-04-19	
2	Hualong One	1116	1200	2020-10-15	2026-06-25	2026-07-04	2026-08-03	
Phase II
3	Hualong One	1116	1200	10 Jun 2025			2029	
4	Hualong One	1116	1200	10 May 2026			2030	
Phase III
5	Hualong One 2.0	1116	1200					
6	Hualong One 2.0	1116	1200					

== See also ==
- Nuclear power in China
