= Zhuanghe Nuclear Power Plant =

Nuclear power station in Dalian, China

The Zhuanghe Nuclear Power Plant is situated in Lizifang Town, Zhuanghe City, Dalian, Liaoning Province, China. It stands as a key project in Liaoning Province's energy structural adjustment and represents the first nuclear power project in Northeast China to adopt the "Hualong One"—an independently developed third-generation nuclear power technology. Designated as a candidate project for commencement under the national *Medium-to-Long-Term Development Plan for Nuclear Power (2023–2035)*, the facility is planned to house six "Hualong One" nuclear power units. These units will be constructed in phases under a unified master plan, with a total investment of approximately 125 billion RMB.

== History ==
Phase I of the project entails the construction of two "Hualong One" reactor units—Units 1 and 2—along with their supporting auxiliary facilities, representing a planned total investment of approximately 44.6 billion RMB. On January 2, 2025, the project received official approval from the Ministry of Ecology and Environment regarding the Environmental Impact Assessment Report (Site Selection Phase) for Phase I of the Liaoning Zhuanghe Nuclear Power Plant. In February 2025, construction commenced on the supporting facilities for Phase I . According to the construction schedule, Unit 1 is slated to officially break ground in June 2027 and be completed in May 2031, while Unit 2 will proceed in parallel, following a 10-month interval. Once fully completed and commissioned, the project is expected to generate approximately 20 billion kilowatt-hours of electricity annually. In 2026, China's State Council approved the construction of 4 Hualong One & two Huanlong one version 2.0 units for Jinqimen (3 & 4), Taipingling (5 & 6), and Zhuanghe (1 & 2).

== Reactor Data ==
Unit	Type	Net Power (MWe)	Gross Power (MWe)	Thermal Power (MWt)	Start construction	First criticality	Grid connection	Commercial operation	Notes
Unit 1	Hualong One	1116	1200	3190	2027-6			2031-5	
Unit 2	Hualong One	1116	1200	3190	2028-4			2032	
Unit 3	Hualong One	1116	1200	3190	In Plan				
Unit 4	Hualong One	1116	1200	3190	In Plan				
Unit 5	Hualong One	1116	1200	3190	In Plan				
Unit 6	Hualong One	1116	1200	3190	In Plan				

== See also ==
- Generation III reactor
- Nuclear power in China
