= Xuwei Nuclear Power Plant =

Proposed nuclear power plant in Jiangsu, China

- Country: People's Republic of China
- Location: Xuwei, Lianyungang, Jiangsu
- Coordinates: 34°37′30″N 119°30′30″E
- Status: Under construction
- Construction cost: Unit 1, 2, 3: total US$10.58 billion
- Owner: CNNC
- Operator: CNNC Suneng NPC

Nuclear power station
- Reactor type: Hualong One PWR; HTR-PM600

Power generation
- Units planned: 3 × 1208 MW, 1 × 660 MW
- Units under const.: 1 × 1208 MW, 1 × 660 MW

The Xuwei Nuclear Power Plant is a nuclear power station under construction in Lianyungang city on the coast of Jiangsu Province, China. The plant is owned by China National Nuclear Corporation (CNNC) through its subsidiary, Suneng Nuclear Power Company. Phase I will consist of two 1208 MWe Hualong One pressurized water reactors (PWR) and one 660 MWe HTR-PM600 high-temperature gas-cooled reactors. total budget 71.96 billion RMB (US$10.58 billion)

The plant is expected to annually produce both 11.5 billion kilowatt-hours of electricity and 32.5 million tonnes of high-temperature steam for local industry.

Approval for the plant was granted by China's State Council in August 2024, and first concrete for Unit 1 was poured in January 2026.

Construction of HTGR has began on November 6th 2026, the expected service lifetime is 60 years.

== Reactor data ==
Unit	Type	Net Capacity	Construction start	Operation start	Notes
Phase I
Unit 1	Hualong One	1208 MW	16 Jan 2026	2030	
Unit 2	Hualong One	1208 MW			
Unit 3	HTR-PM600	660 MW	6 Nov 2026		
Phase II
Unit 4	Hualong One				
Unit 5	Hualong One				
Unit 6	HTR-PM600				

== See also ==
- Nuclear power in China
