= CNNC International Limited =

Chinese nuclear company

- Company type: Public company
- Traded as: SEHK: 2302
- Industry: Nuclear
- Founded: September 19, 2002
- Headquarters: Hong Kong, China
- Area served: China
- Key people: Du Yunbin (Chairman)
- Products: Uranium
- Revenue: HKD 57,755,000
- Net income: HKD 220,711,000 (2015)
- Number of employees: 15 (as of 31 December 2015)
- Parent: China National Nuclear Corporation
- Website: www.cnncintl.com

CNNC International Limited (中核國際有限公司) is a Chinese company listed in the Hong Kong Stock Exchange. It is a subsidiary of China National Nuclear Corporation ("CNNC", Chinese: 中国核工业集团公司), and is primarily focused on developing overseas uranium resources.

== History ==
The company was incorporated in Cayman Islands . It was formerly known as United Metals Holdings Limited (科鑄技術集團有限公司), and was listed in the Hong Kong Stock Exchange on 6 January 2003.

In June 2008, CNNC acquired the controlling share of the company at a price of HKD 1.77 per share via its subsidiary. On 12 December 2008, the company adopted its current company name.

== Shareholders ==
According to the 2015 Annual Report of the company, CNNC is the largest shareholder of the company, holding 66.72% of the issued share capital of the company. CNNC is a state-owned enterprise supervised by the State-owned Assets Supervision and Administration Commission.

== See also ==
- Nuclear power in China
- China National Nuclear Corporation
