= Tianwan Nuclear Power Plant =

Nuclear power plant located in Lianyungang, Jiangsu Province, China

Tianwan Nuclear Power Plant 田湾核电站
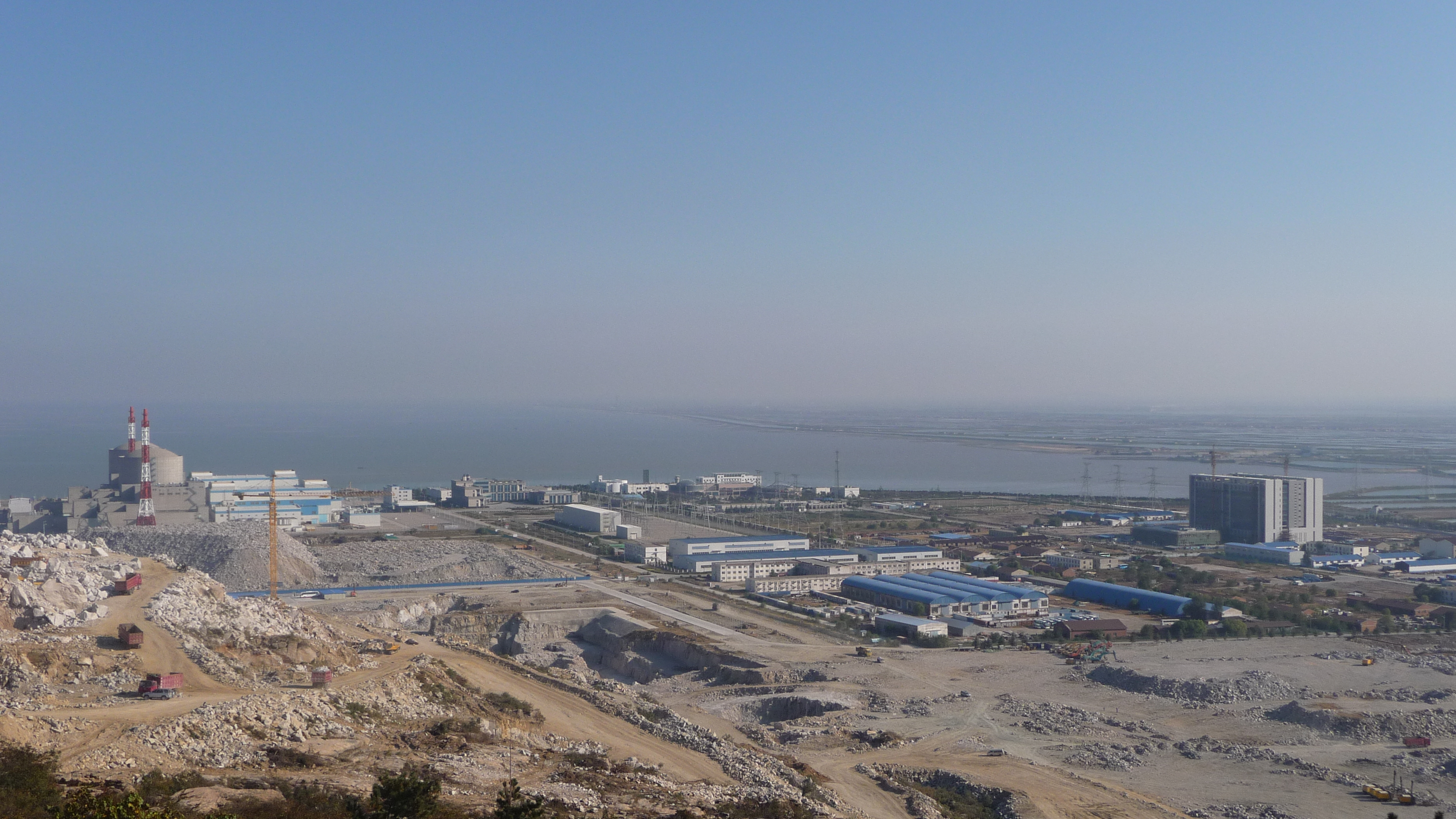
- Units one and two in operation, with the construction site for units three and four
- Country: China
- Coordinates: 34°41′13″N 119°27′35″E
- Status: Operating / Under construction
- Construction began: 1999
- Commission date: May 17, 2006
- Construction cost: Unit 1 & 2: Over $3.2 billion; Unit 3 & 4: $6 billion (Estimated)
- Owner: Jiangsu Nuclear Power Corporation

Nuclear power station
- Reactor type: PWR
- Reactor supplier: Atomstroyexport

Power generation
- Units operational: 2 × 990 MW VVER-1000/428 (AES-91); 2 × 1060 MW VVER-1000/428M; 2 × 1000 MW ACPR-1000
- Units under const.: 2 × 1171 MW VVER-1200
- Nameplate capacity: 6,608 MW_{e} (6,100 MW_{e} net)

External links
- Commons: Related media on Commons

Tianwan Nuclear Power Plant
- Simplified Chinese: 田湾核电站
- Traditional Chinese: 田灣核電站
- Hanyu Pinyin: Tiánwān Hédiànzhàn
Transcriptions
Standard Mandarin
- Hanyu Pinyin: Tiánwān Hédiànzhàn

Tianwan Nuclear Power Plant is a nuclear power plant (NPP) on the coast of the Yellow Sea, approximately 30 kilometers east of downtown Lianyungang, Jiangsu Province, China. The plant's owner is Jiangsu Nuclear Power Corporation, a joint venture with majority owner a subsidiary of China National Nuclear Corporation (CNNC).

The plant is planned to have eight reactor units, and full operation is expected to commence in 2027. Construction began in October 1999, and was the first instance of civilian nuclear cooperation between Russia and China. When all the units are complete, Tianwan will be the world's largest nuclear power plant, with generation capacity exceeding 9,000 MWe.

== Design ==
The station has four levels of security. There's a double asbestos cluster, which blocks any kind of emissions. Also there's a revolutionary security improvement called the trap, which prevents any leakage of nuclear fuel in the event of a breakdown

— Alexandr Selikhov, head of Atomstroyexport's delegation to China

Most units use VVER pressurized water reactor (PWR) technology supplied from Russia. The first four units are Russian standard reactors of type VVER-1000, and have capacity approximately 1 GW. Units 5 and 6 are Chinese-designed ACPR-1000 reactors, with a traditional 3-loop system. Units 7 and 8 will use the updated VVER-1200 design capable of approximately 1.2 GW, with twice the expected operational lifetime and a 2/3-slower refueling cadence.

The reactor units are housed in a confinement shell that can withstand a 20-ton aircraft crash, and have special earthquake protections. Other important safety features include an emergency "core catcher" in case of meltdown.

The reactor and turbo-generators are of Russian design, but an international consortium, including Siemens, designed and built the control room. Previous control-room designs had not conformed to Western safety standards. A normal staffing load includes 5 control-room operators, but 94% of the systems are automated, and, in most circumstances, the plant could safely operate unattended. Refueling procedures, in particular, require little human intervention.

When complete, the plant's nameplate capacity will exceed 8000 MW. This will make it the world's largest nuclear plant, surpassing both the active Kori NPP (7,411 MWe) and the inactive Kashiwazaki-Kariwa NPP (7,965 MWe).

=== Reactors ===
The Tianwan nuclear power plant has six operating units and two under construction:

Unit	Reactor type	Capacity (MW)			Construction		Criticality	Grid intertie	Commercial operations
Unit	Reactor type	Net	Gross	Thermal	Start	Contractor	Criticality	Grid intertie	Commercial operations
1	VVER-1000/428 (AES-91)	990	1060	3000	1999-10-20	Atomstroyexport (ASE)	2005-12-20	2006-05-12	2007-05-17
2	VVER-1000/428	990	1060	3000	2000-10-20	ASE	2007-05-01	2007-05-14	2007-08-16
3	VVER-1000/428M	1060	1126	3000	2012-12-27	ASE & CNPE	2017-09-29	2017-12-30	2018-02-14
4	VVER-1000/428M	1060	1126	3000	2013-09-27	ASE & CNPE	2018-09-30	2018-10-27	2018-12-22
5	ACPR-1000	1000	1118	2905	2015-12-27	China Nuclear Power Engineering, Ltd. (CNPE)	2020-07-27	2020-08-08	2020-09-08
6	ACPR-1000	1000	1118	2905	2016-09-07	CNPE	2021-05-04	2021-05-11	2021-06-03
7	VVER-1200	1171	1265	3212	2021-05-19			2026-10-08	2026 (planned)
8	VVER-1200	1171	1265	3212	2022-02-25				2027 (planned)

== History ==
The Tianwan reactor's genesis is a 1992 nuclear cooperation agreement between Russia and China. Regulators approved the initial design in 1997, and construction commenced on unit 1 in 1999 and a year later on Unit 2. At the time, it was the largest reactor project of that design, and initial construction was slow. Corrosion in steam pipes delayed completion, but unit 1 went critical in 2005, and both units 1 and 2 entered commercial operation in 2007. Russia delivered initial fuel loads for the Tianwan reactors, but China planned to begin indigenous fuel fabrication for the Tianwan plant in 2010, using technology transferred from Russian manufacturer TVEL.

One year earlier (2009), Jiangsu Nuclear Power Corporation signed a contract with Atomstroyexport (ASE) for units 3 and 4, but the 2011 Fukushima nuclear disaster delayed the start of construction for unit 3 until the end of 2012. Construction of unit 4 would begin about a year later, and the development cadence became quite swift. In 2015 and 2016, China National Nuclear Corporation (CNNC) started construction of units 5 and 6 (respectively). In 2017, unit 3 achieved criticality, and both units 3 and 4 started commercial operation in 2018.

Units 3 and 4 initially remained owned by ASE, but in March 2019, CNNC contracted with ASE for units 7 and 8. The following January, ASE transferred control of units 3 and 4 to Jiangsu Nuclear Power Corporation.

Later in 2020, unit 5 achieved criticality and then entered commercial operation. Unit 6 entered commercial operation in June 2021.

Construction of unit 7 began in May 2021, and loaded the first fuel in Aug 11, 2026. Unit 8 began construction in 2022 and commercial operation of units 7 and 8 is expected to begin by 2027.

== Plant Ownership ==
The plant is owned by Jiangsu Nuclear Power Corporation (JNPC), a joint venture between China National Nuclear Power (50%), Shang Hai HeXi Power Investment (30%), and Jiangsu Guoxin Group (20%).

== Cost ==
The projected cost for Phase I of the project, which involved the first two VVER-1000/428 units, was initially set at $2.5 billion but ultimately exceeded $3.2 billion. In comparison, the estimated cost for Phase II, which included the next two VVER-1000/428M units, was $6 billion.

For units 1-4, the reactors are Rosatom products, but Atomstroyexport designed the units as a whole.

== See also ==
- List of nuclear reactors#China
- Nuclear power in China
