= Zhangzhou Nuclear Power Plant =

Nuclear power station in Fujian, China

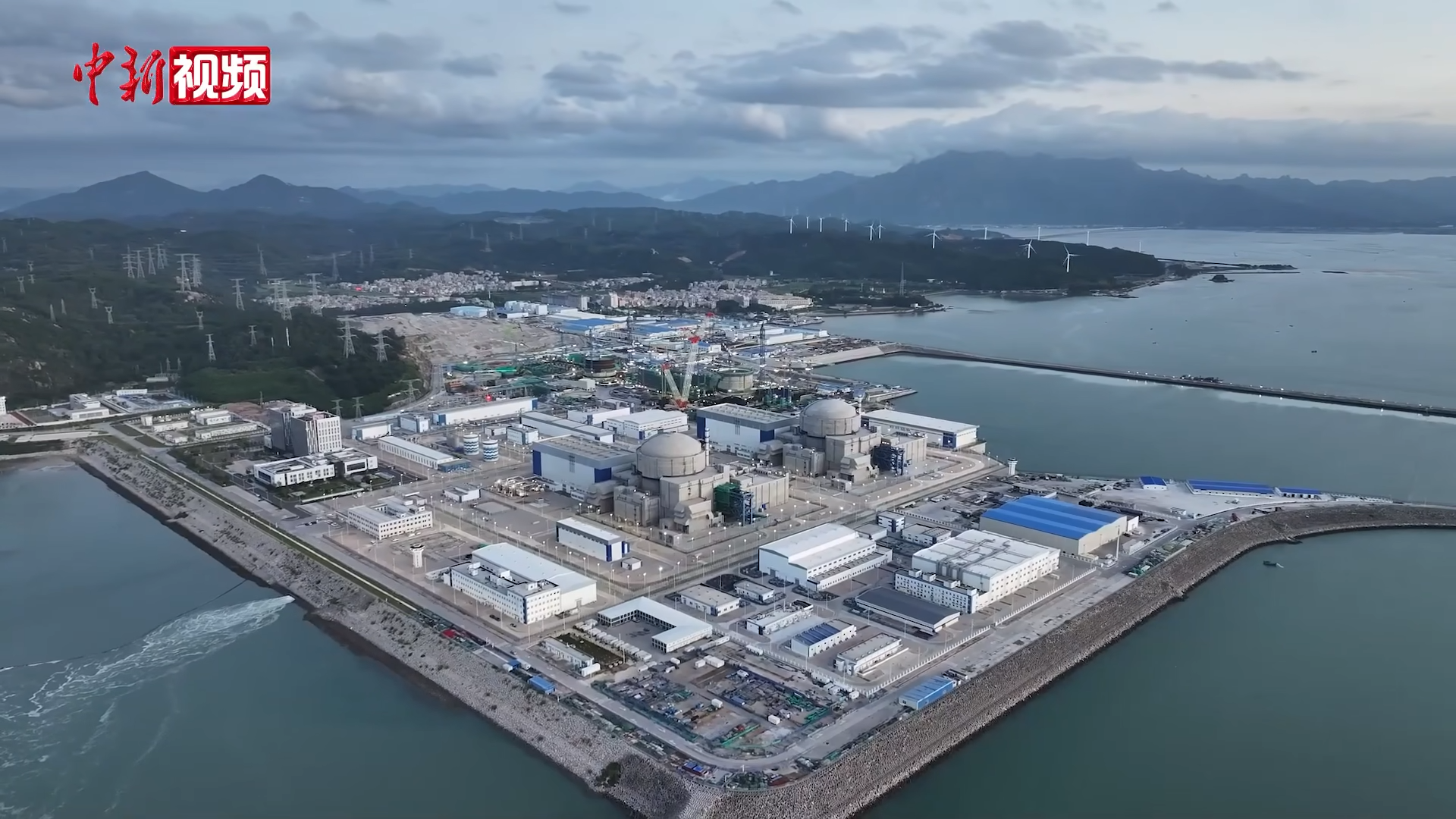
- Country: People's Republic of China
- Location: Lieyuzhen, Yunxiao, Zhangzhou
- Coordinates: 23°49′45″N 117°29′30″E
- Status: Operational
- Construction began: 2017
- Commission date: 2025
- Owners: CNNC, etc.
- Operator: CNNC-Guodian Zhangzhou Energy Company

Nuclear power station
- Reactor type: Hualong One PWR

Power generation
- Units operational: 2 × 1126 MW
- Units planned: 2 × 1000 MW
- Units under const.: 2 × 1000 MW

The Zhangzhou Nuclear Power Plant (Chinese: 漳州核电厂) is a nuclear power station under construction in Lieyu Town, Yunxiao County, Zhangzhou on the coast of Fujian Province, in southeast China. The plant is owned by CNNC Guodian Zhangzhou Energy Co. Ltd., established in November 2011, which is owned by China National Nuclear Corporation (51%) and China Guodian Corporation (49%). CNNC originally planned to have AP1000 light water reactors, but later changed plans to the Hualong One design.

China's Ministry of Ecology and Environment issued construction licenses for Zhangzhou units 1 and 2 on 9 October 2019, and first concrete for Unit 1 was poured one week later, on 16 October.

China's State Council approved the construction of two Hualong One units as Phase II on 14 September 2022. Construction of the first began on 22 February 2024.

The first unit began commercial operation on 1 January 2025, 5.2 years after the start of construction.

The second unit began commercial operation on 1 January 2026.

From May 2024, units 5 and 6 are steadily advancing site selection and preliminary environmental impact assessment work.

== Reactor data ==
The Zhangzhou Nuclear Power Plant consists of 6 planned reactors.

Unit	Type	Net Capacity	Gross Capacity	Construction start	Grid connection	Commercial operation start	Notes
Phase I
Unit 1	Hualong One	1126 MW	1212 MW	16 Oct 2019	28 Nov 2024	1 Jan 2025	
Unit 2	Hualong One	1126 MW	1212 MW	4 Sept 2020	24 Nov 2025	1 Jan 2026	
Phase II
Unit 3	Hualong One	1129 MW	1214 MW	22 Feb 2024		2029 (est.)	
Unit 4	Hualong One	1129 MW	1214 MW	27 Sep 2024			
Phase III (In Plan)
Unit 5	Hualong One	1129 MW	1214 MW				
Unit 6	Hualong One	1129 MW	1214 MW				

== See also ==
- Nuclear power in China
