= Zhaoyuan Nuclear Power Plant =

Nuclear plant in Shandong, China

- Country: People's Republic of China
- Location: Zhaoyuan, Shandong
- Coordinates: 37°29′14″N 120°20′43″E
- Status: Under construction
- Construction began: 18 November 2025
- Construction cost: CNY120 billion (US$16.9 billion)
- Owner: Shandong Zhaoyuan NPC

Nuclear power station
- Reactor type: PWR
- Cooling source: Bohai Sea

Power generation
- Make and model: Hualong One
- Units planned: 4 × 1116 MW
- Units under const.: 2 × 1116 MW

Zhaoyuan Nuclear Power Plant is a nuclear power plant in Shandong province, China. It is planned to house six Hualong One pressurized water reactors, which will produce about 50 TW-hr per year.

The plant is located in Zhangxing, Zhaoyuan, Yantai, Shandong. Because it is several kilometers inland, southeast of Laizhou Bay, it will be the first plant to use a 203 m cooling tower.

The project is being constructed and will be operated by Shandong Zhaoyuan Nuclear Power Company, a subsidiary of China General Nuclear (CGN). The plant is expected to cost about CNY120 billion (US$16.9 billion).

In August 2024, the State Council approved 11 reactors, including the first two at Zhaoyuan. In November 2025, the first nuclear concrete was poured for Zhaoyuan 1. Construction is expected to take 50–60 months.

== Reactor data ==
The Zhaoyuan Nuclear Power Plant consists of one reactor under construction and five planned reactors.

Unit	Type	Net Capacity	Gross Capacity	Construction start	Operation start	Notes
Phase I
Zhaoyuan 1	Hualong One	1117 MW	1214 MW	18 Nov 2025		
Zhaoyuan 2	Hualong One	1116 MW	1200 MW	5 Sep 2026		
Phase II
Zhaoyuan 3	Hualong One	1116 MW	1200 MW			
Zhaoyuan 4	Hualong One	1116 MW	1200 MW			
Zhaoyuan 5	Hualong One	1116 MW	1200 MW			
Zhaoyuan 6	Hualong One	1116 MW	1200 MW			

== See also ==
- Nuclear power in China
- List of commercial nuclear reactors § China
- Generation IV reactor
