= Hualong One =

Chinese nuclear reactor design

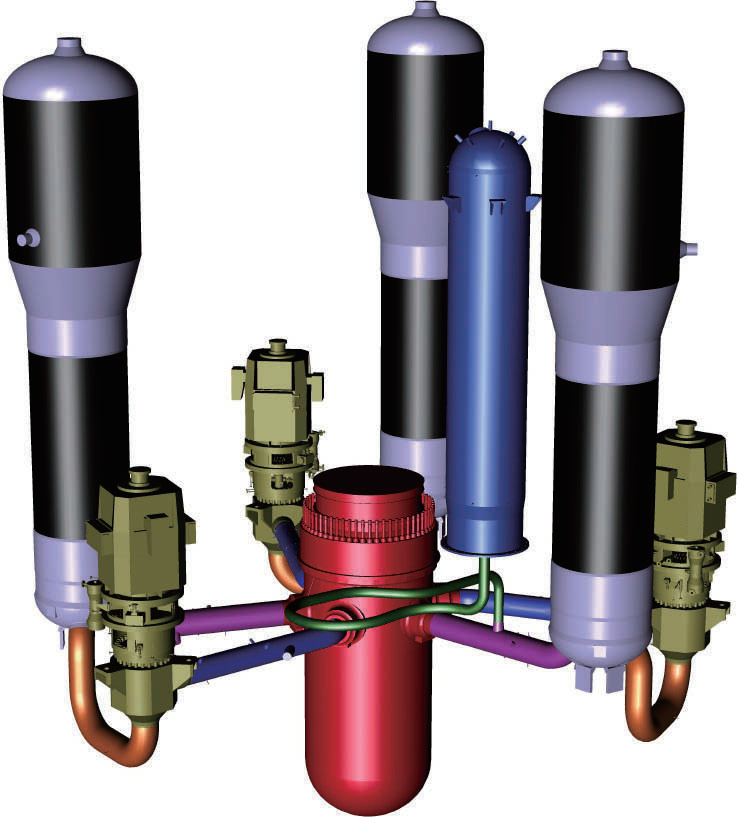
Primary coolant system showing reactor pressure vessel (red), steam generators (purple), pressurizer (blue), and pumps (green) in the three coolant loop Hualong One design

The Hualong One (Chinese: 华龙一号; pinyin: Huálóng yī hào; lit. 'China Dragon №1') is a Chinese Generation III pressurized water nuclear reactor jointly developed by the China General Nuclear Power Group (CGN) and the China National Nuclear Corporation (CNNC). The CGN version, and its derived export version, is called HPR1000. It is commonly mistakenly referred to in media as the "ACPR1000" and "ACP1000", which are in fact earlier reactors design programs by CGN and CNNC.

Unit 5 of the Fuqing Nuclear Power Plant was the first Hualong One to enter commercial service on 30 January 2021.

== Design ==
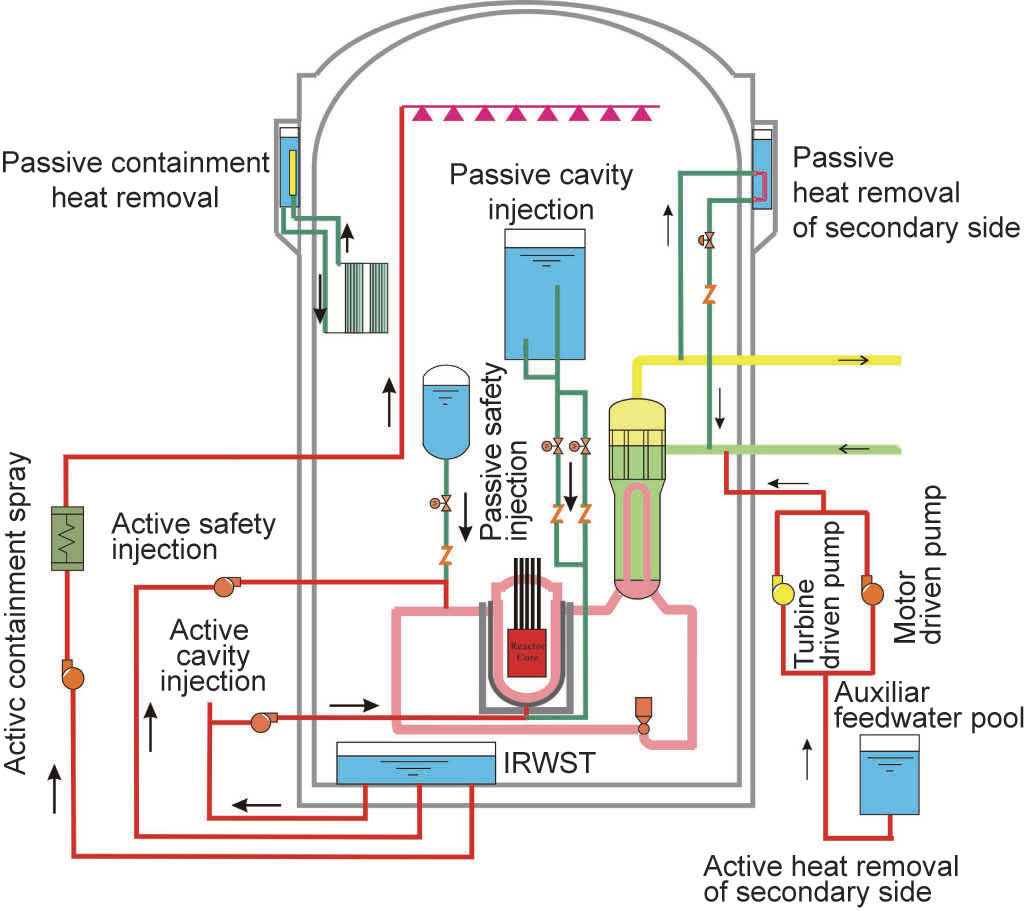
Active and passive cooling systems of the HPR1000 (Hualong One) Red line − active systems Green line − passive systems IRWST − in-containment refuelling water storage tank

Hualong One is jointly developed by the China National Nuclear Corporation (CNNC) and China General Nuclear Power Group (CGN), based on the three-loop ACP1000 of CNNC and ACPR1000 of CGN, which in turn are based on the French M310.

=== Merger of ACP-1000 and ACPR-1000 into Hualong One ===
Since 2012, CNNC has been progressively merging its ACP-1000 nuclear power station design with the CGN ACPR-1000 design, while allowing some differences, under direction of the Chinese nuclear regulator. Both are three-loop designs originally based on the same French M310 design used in Daya Bay with 157 fuel assemblies, but went through different development processes (CNNC's ACP-1000 has a more domestic design with 177 fuel assemblies while CGN's ACPR-1000 is a closer copy with 157 fuel assemblies). In early 2014, it was announced that the merged design was moving from preliminary design to detailed design. Power output will be 1150 MWe, with a 60-year design life, and would use a combination of passive and active safety systems with a double containment. CNNC's 177 fuel assembly design was retained.

Initially the merged design was to be called the ACC-1000, but ultimately it was named Hualong One. In August 2014 the Chinese nuclear regulator review panel classified the design as a Generation III reactor design, with independently owned intellectual property rights. As a result of the success of the merger, ACP-1000 and ACPR-1000 designs are no longer being offered.

After the merger, both companies retain their own supply chain and their versions of the Hualong One will differ slightly (units built by CGN will retain some features from the ACPR1000) but the design is considered to be standardised. CNNC version emphasizes more passive safety due to influence from Westinghouse AP1000, with increased containment volume and two active safety trains, while CGN version has three active safety trains due to influence from Areva EPR. Some 90% of its components will be made domestically.

The Hualong One power output will be 1170 MWe gross, 1090 MWe net, with a 60-year design life, and would use a combination of passive and active safety systems with a double containment. It has a 177 assembly core design with an 18-month refuelling cycle. The power plant's utilisation rate is as high as 90%. CNNC has said its active and passive safety systems, double-layer containment and other technologies meet the highest international safety standards.

According to CNNC, the Hualong One has a construction cost of CNY17,000 per kW.

A the end of August 2014, Chinese regulators were satisfied that Hualong One was a Generation III design and that intellectual property rights were fully held in China.

Chinese media reports that all core components are manufactured in China and that 17 universities and research institutions, 58 state-owned enterprises and over 140 private firms across China worked on Hualong One's development to ensure all core components were able to be produced domestically.

=== EU approval ===
In November 2021, the European Utility Requirements (EUR) organisation formally certified the Hualong One (HPR1000) as compliant after a four-step process which began in August 2017. The requirements covered a broad range of conditions for nuclear power plants to operate efficiently and safely.

=== UK approval ===
In February 2022, UK regulators announced that the Hualong One (HPR1000) had passed the four-step Generic Design Assessment (GDA) which started in August 2017 and was thus suitable for construction in the UK, possibly in the Bradwell B nuclear power station project. The Office for Nuclear Regulation issued a Design Acceptance Confirmation (DAC) and the UK Environment Agency issued a Statement of Design Acceptability (SoDA).

== Construction ==
The first units to be constructed will be Fuqing 5 and 6 (Fujian Province), followed by Fangchenggang 3 and 4 (Guangxi), Zhangzhou 1 and 2 (Fujian), Taipingling 1 and 2 (Guangdong), and San'Ao 1 and 2 (Zhejiang). Fuqing 5 began commercial operation on 30 January 2021. CGN's first Hualong One reactor (HPR1000) was connected to the grid on 10 January 2023.

In 2023, China's State Council approved the construction of six Hualong One units for Ningde (5 & 6), Shidaowan (1 & 2), and Zhangzhou (3 & 4). In 2024, China's State Council approved the construction of six Hualong One units for Xuwei (1 & 2), Zhaoyuan (1 & 2), and San'ao (1 & 2). In 2025, China's State Council approved the construction of eight Hualong One units for Fangchenggang (5 & 6), Sanmen (5 & 6), Taisahn (3 & 4), and Haiyang (5 & 6). In 2026, China's State Council approved the construction of 4 Hualong One & two Huanlong one version 2.0 units for Jinqimen (3 & 4), Taipingling (5 & 6), and Zhuanghe (1 & 2).

There are five Hualong One reactors planned for Pakistan, four reactors are planned at Karachi Nuclear Power Complex and one reactor at Chashma Nuclear Power Plant, out of which two are under construction at Karachi. Construction of another Hualong One reactor was planned to start in 2020 in Argentina, but was stalled during negotiation. The project was reactivated in 2021 and expected to start construction in mid 2022, with completion date by 2028.

=== China ===
Name	Unit No.	Status	Construction start	Grid connection
Changjiang	3	Operational	31 March 2021	1 August 2026
Changjiang	4	Under construction	28 December 2021	
Fangchenggang	3	Operational	24 December 2015	25 March 2023
Fangchenggang	4	Operational	23 December 2016	9 April 2024
Fangchenggang	5	Approved for construction		
Fangchenggang	6	Approved for construction		
Fuqing	5	Operational	7 May 2015	27 November 2020
Fuqing	6	Operational	22 December 2015	1 January 2022
Jinqimen	1	Under construction	10 August 2025	
Jinqimen	2	Under construction	7 April 2026	
Jinqimen	3	Approved for construction		
Jinqimen	4	Approved for construction		
Lufeng	5	Under construction	8 September 2022	
Lufeng	6	Under construction	26 August 2023	
Ningde	5	Under constructionl	28 July 2024	2029 (est.)
Ningde	6	Under construction	17 December 2025	2030 (est.)
San'ao	1	Operational	31 December 2020	2026-03-14
San'ao	2	Under construction	31 December 2021	
San'ao	3	Under construction	18 November 2025	
San'ao	4	Under construction	10 November 2026	
Sanmen	5	Approved for construction		
Sanmen	6	Approved for construction		
Shidaowan	1	Under construction	29 July 2024	2029
Shidaowan	2	Under construction	29 July 2024	2029
Taishan	3	Approved for construction		
Taishan	4	Approved for construction		
Taipingling	1	Operational	26 December 2019	2026-02-13
Taipingling	2	Operational	15 October 2020	2026-07-04
Taipingling	3	Under construction	10 June 2025	
Taipingling	4	Under construction	10 May 2026	
Taipingling	5	Approved for construction		
Taipingling	6	Approved for construction		
Xiapu	4	Approved for construction		
Xiapu	5	Approved for construction		
Xuwei	1	Under construction	16 January 2026	
Xuwei	2	Under construction	2026	
Zhangzhou	1	Operational	16 October 2019	1 January 2025
Zhangzhou	2	Operational	4 September 2020	24 November 2025
Zhangzhou	3	Under construction	22 February 2024	
Zhangzhou	4	Under construction	27 September 2024	
Zhaoyuan	1	Under construction	18 November 2025	
Zhaoyuan	2	Under construction	5 September 2026	
Zhuanghe	1	Approved for construction		
Zhuanghe	2	Approved for construction		

=== Pakistan ===
Name	Unit No.	Status	Construction start	Grid connection
Karachi	2	Operational	20 August 2015	18 March 2021
Karachi	3	Operational	31 May 2016	4 March 2022
Chashma	5	Under construction	30 December 2024	

== International marketing ==
In December 2015, CGN and CNNC agreed to create Hualong International Nuclear Power Technology Co as a joint venture to promote the Hualong One in overseas markets, which was officially launched in March 2016. On 19 January 2017, the United Kingdom Office for Nuclear Regulation (ONR) started their Generic Design Assessment process for the Hualong One, expected to be completed in 2021, in advance of possible deployment at the Bradwell nuclear power station site. On 16 November 2017, the ONR and the Environment Agency announced they are progressing to the next phase of their Generic Design Assessment of the UK HPR1000 reactor. Step 2 formally commenced on this day and is planned to take about 12 months. The targeted timescale for the UK HPR1000 GDA process is about five years from the start of Step 1.

== Hualong One 2.0 ==
In the same year that the first Hualong One entered commercial operation, CNNC indicated plans to start building a follow-on version, Hualong One 2.0, by 2024. It would be a more economical version using similar technology, reducing build time from 5 years to 4, and reducing costs by around a fourth from 17,000 yuan per kW to 13,000 yuan per kW.

Construction on a next-generation unit did not commence by 2025, but regulators approved the "Hualong One version 2.0" which was subsequently used in demonstration projects.

The Hualong One 2.0 design does not rely on alternating-current power supplies for key safety functions but features an all-passive safety system. The 2.0 version optimizes both active and passive safety systems, allowing no operator intervention for 72 hours after an accident and enabling the plant to maintain autonomous accident response for seven days. The upgraded model has also simplified auxiliary systems. It reduces pipeline length by about 31 percent, the number of process valves by about 25 percent, the volume of nuclear island buildings by approximately 21 percent, and nuclear island installation work by about 33 percent. The proportion of automated operation of the units has also increased significantly.

During 31 July 2026 meeting of State Council, chaired by Chinese Premier Li Qiang, it was decided that the 3rd and 4th units of Jinqimen plant and 5th and 6th units of Taipingling plant will be Hualong One 2.0.

== See also ==
- Generation III reactor
- Nuclear power in China
