= Fuqing Nuclear Power Plant =

Nuclear power plant in Fujian Province, China

- Official name: 福清核电站
- Country: China
- Location: Qianxue, Fuqing, Fujian
- Coordinates: 25°26′45″N 119°26′50″E
- Status: Operational
- Construction began: November 21, 2008
- Commission date: Unit 1: August 20, 2014; Unit 2: August 6, 2015; Unit 3: September 7, 2016; Unit 4: July 29, 2017; Unit 5: November 27, 2020; Unit 6: January 1, 2022
- Owner: Fujian Fuqing Nuclear Co.
- Operator: China National Nuclear Corporation (CNNC)

Nuclear power station
- Reactor type: PWR
- Thermal capacity: 4 × 2,905 MW_{t}; 2 × 3,060 MW_{t}

Power generation
- Units operational: 4 × 1,000 MW_{e}; 2 × 1,075 MW_{e}
- Make and model: CNP-1000 (Units 1-4); HPR-1000 (Units 5-6)
- Nameplate capacity: 6,656 MW_{e} (6,120 MW_{e} net)
- Annual net output: 2021: 39,394.32 GWh (141,819.6 TJ) (Units 1-5 only)

External links
- Website: www.cnnp.com.cn/cnnp/cydwzd62/fjfqhdyxgs/1101192/index.html

The Fuqing Nuclear Power Plant (simplified Chinese: 福清核电站; traditional Chinese: 福清核電站; pinyin: Fúqīng Hédiànzhàn) is a nuclear power plant in Fuqing, Fujian Province, China. The plant is located on the coast of Xinghua Bay, near Qianxue Village, Sanshan Town. The station has four 1,089 megawatt (MW) CPR-1000 pressurized water reactors (PWRs). The CPR-1000 is an advanced PWR design developed by China from the Areva-designed PWRs at the Daya Bay Nuclear Power Plant. The plant was jointly constructed and is operated by China National Nuclear Corporation (51%), China Huadian Corp. (39%) and the Fujian Investment & Development Co Ltd. (10%).

Construction of the first unit began on 21 November 2008 and was completed in 2014. First concrete for Unit 2 was poured on 17 June 2009 and the unit was started in October 2015. First concrete for Unit 3 was poured on 31 December 2010. Construction of Unit 4 was to begin in 2011, but was delayed until November 2012 by China's nuclear safety review following the Fukushima nuclear disaster.

In November 2014 it was announced that units 5 and 6 would be of the Hualong One (updated CPR-1000) design, with unit 5 scheduled to be in operation about 2019. The first concrete was poured for Fuqing 5 on 7 May 2015. Unit 5 achieved criticality in October 2020, the first Hualong One reactor to reach the milestone. The unit was connected to the grid the following month. It began commercial operation on 30 January 2021. Unit 6 achieved criticality in December 2021, was connected to the grid in January 2022, and began commercial operation on 25 March 2022.

== Reactor data ==
The Fuqing Nuclear Power Plant consist of 6 operational reactors.

Unit	Type / Model	Net power	Gross power	Thermal power	Start construction	First criticality	Grid connection	Commercial operation	Notes
Phase I
Fuqing 1	PWR / CNP-1000	1000MW	1089MW	2905MW	2008-11-21	2014-07-24	2014-08-20	2014-11-22	
Fuqing 2	PWR / CNP-1000	1000MW	1089MW	2905MW	2009-6-18	2015-07-22	2015-08-06	2015-10-16	
Phase II
Fuqing 3	PWR / CNP-1000	1000MW	1089MW	2905MW	2010-12-31	2016-07-03	2016-09-07	2016-10-24	
Fuqing 4	PWR / CNP-1000	1000MW	1089MW	2905MW	2012-11-17	2017-07-16	2017-07-29	2017-09-17	
Fuqing 5	PWR / HPR-1000	1060MW	1150MW	3060MW	2015-05-07	2020-10-21	2020-11-27	2021-01-30	
Fuqing 6	PWR / HPR-1000	1060MW	1150MW	3060MW	2015-12-22	2021-12-13	2022-01-01	2022-03-25	

== See also ==
- Nuclear power in China
- List of nuclear reactors § China
