= San'ao Nuclear Power Plant =

Chinese nuclear power plant

- Country: China
- Location: Wenzhou, Zhejiang
- Coordinates: 27.202°N 120.513°E
- Status: Operational
- Construction began: September 2020
- Construction cost: US$10.24 billion
- Operator: China General Nuclear Power Group

Nuclear power station
- Reactor type: Hualong One

Power generation
- Units operational: 1 × 1126 MW
- Units planned: 2 × 1126 MW
- Units under const.: 3 × 1126 MW

The San'ao Nuclear Power Plant (Chinese: 三奥核电站) is a nuclear plant in the Zhejiang province of eastern China. It is planned to house six Hualong One pressurised water reactors.

The plant is expected to produce 52.5 terawatt-hours of energy per year and will supply the larger Yangtze River Delta region.

== Construction ==
Construction of the plant was authorized in May 2015 by the Chinese government. The plant is being constructed by the Cangnan Nuclear Power Company, under the aegis of the state-owned China General Nuclear Power Group (CGN). Construction of the first unit began on 31 December 2020 and construction of the second unit on 30 December 2021. The unit 1 began operation in April 29, 2026 . The second unit would begin operation in 2027.

In August 2024, CGN received approval to construct units 3 and 4.

== Reactor data ==
The San'ao Nuclear Power Plant consists of 6 planned reactors.

Unit	Type	Net Capacity MWe	Gross Capacity MWe	Construction start	Operation start	Notes
Phase I
San'ao 1	Hualong One	1126	1208	31 December 2020	29 April 2026	
San'ao 2	Hualong One	1126	1208	30 December 2021	2027	
Phase II
San'ao 3	Hualong One	1126	1208	19 November 2025		
San'ao 4	Hualong One	1126	1208	10 November 2026		
Phase III
San'ao 5	Hualong One	1126	1208	proposed		
San'ao 6	Hualong One	1126	1208	proposed		

== See also ==
- Nuclear power in China
