= CNP-300 =

The CNP-300 is a pressurized water nuclear reactor developed by the China National Nuclear Corporation (CNNC).

It is China's first domestic commercial nuclear reactor design, with development beginning in the 1970s based on a nuclear submarine reactor design.

The reactor has a thermal capacity of 999 MW and a gross electrical capacity of 325 MW, with a net output of about 300 MWe and a two-loop design.

The first CNP-300 unit started operations in Qinshan Nuclear Power Plant in 1991.

The CNP-300 was the first Chinese nuclear reactor to be exported, with the installation of the first unit at Chashma Nuclear Power Plant in Pakistan. The unit began operation in 2000. Another unit was completed in 2011 and two more units began operation in 2016 and 2017 at the same plant.

== See also ==
- CNP / ACP nuclear reactors
- Nuclear power in China
- China National Nuclear Corporation
