= Jinqimen Nuclear Power Plant =

Chinese nuclear power plant

- Country: China
- Location: Ningbo, Zhejiang
- Coordinates: 29°03′23″N 121°56′41″E
- Status: Under construction
- Construction began: February 2024
- Construction cost: US$6.2 billion

Nuclear power station
- Reactors: 6 (planned)

Power generation
- Units planned: 6
- Nameplate capacity: 7.2 GW

The Jinqimen Nuclear Power Plant is a nuclear reactor under construction in Fan'ao Town, Xiangshan, Ningbo, in the Zhejiang province of eastern China. It is planned to house 6 Hualong One pressurized water reactors.

CNNC subsidiary CNNC Zhejiang Energy Co Ltd will be responsible for construction of the plant.

When complete, the plant is expected to produce 55 terawatt-hours (6.3 gigawatt-years) of electricity per year.

== Construction ==
Construction of the plant was authorized in December 2023 by the Chinese government, and site preparation began in February 2024. The first concrete for Unit 1 was poured on 10 August 2025, marking the start of construction.

Phase II consists of unit 3 & 4, China's State Council approved the construction in August 2026.

== Reactor data ==
The Jinqimen Nuclear Power Plant consists of 6 planned reactors.

Unit	Type	Net Capacity	Gross Capacity	Construction start	Operation start	Notes
Phase I
Jinqimen 1	Hualong One	1126 MW	1212 MW	2025-08-10		
Jinqimen 2	Hualong One	1126 MW	1212 MW	2026-04-07		
Phase II
Jinqimen 3	Hualong One 2.0	1126 MW	1212 MW	Approved		
Jinqimen 4	Hualong One 2.0	1126 MW	1212 MW	Approved		
Phase III
Jinqimen 5	Hualong One	1126 MW	1212 MW	Proposed		
Jinqimen 6	Hualong One	1126 MW	1212 MW	Proposed		

== See also ==
- Nuclear power in China
