= Fangchenggang Nuclear Power Plant =

Nuclear power plant in Guangxi, China

- Country: People's Republic of China
- Location: Hongsha, Gangkou, Fangchenggang, Guangxi
- Coordinates: 21°40′15″N 108°33′30″E
- Status: Operational
- Construction began: 30 July 2010
- Commission date: 1 January 2016
- Operator: Guangxi Fangchenggang Nuclear Power Group

Nuclear power station
- Reactor type: CPR-1000, HPR-1000
- Cooling source: Gulf of Tonkin

Power generation
- Units operational: 4 × 1,000 MW
- Units planned: 2 × 1000 MW
- Nameplate capacity: 4,000 MW

Fangchenggang Nuclear Power Plant (simplified Chinese: 防城港核电站; traditional Chinese: 防城港核電站; pinyin: Fángchénggǎng hédiànzhàn), also known as Fangchenggang Hongsha Nuclear Power Plant (simplified Chinese: 防城港红沙核电站; traditional Chinese: 防城港紅沙核電站), is a nuclear power plant in Fangchenggang, near Hongsha Village (simplified Chinese: 红沙村; traditional Chinese: 紅沙村), autonomous region of Guangxi (Guangxi Zhuang Autonomous Region) in the People's Republic of China. A total of six reactors are planned to operate at the Fangchenggang site. Units 1 and 2 are both CPR-1000s, units 3–4 are Hualong Ones, units 5–6 are planned also to be Hualong One reactors. Fangchenggang 3 and 4 will be the reference plant for the proposed Bradwell B plant in the UK.

The plant is located about 54 kilometres from the border with Vietnam. It is a project of Guangxi Fangchenggang Nuclear Power Group, a joint venture between China Guangdong Nuclear Power Co (CGNPC) and Guangxi Investment Group.

Unit 1 was connected to the electricity grid on 25 October 2015. Unit 1 is commercially operating starting on 1 January 2016.

Construction works for Unit 3 started in December 2015. Unit 3 first concrete pour occurred on 24 December 2015. First concrete for Unit 4 followed one year later, on 23 December 2016.

== Reactor data ==
The Fangchenggang Nuclear Power Plant consist of 4 operational reactors and 2 reactors planned.

Unit	Type /Model	Net power	Gross power	Thermal power	Construction start	First criticality	Grid connection	Operation start	Notes
Phase I
Fangchenggang 1	PWR / CPR-1000	1000 MW	1086 MW	2905 MW	2010-07-30	2015-10-13	2015-10-25	2016-01-01	
Fangchenggang 2	PWR / CPR-1000	1000 MW	1086 MW	2905 MW	2010-12-23	2016-06-29	2016-07-15	2016-10-01	
Phase II
Fangchenggang 3	PWR / HPR1000	1000 MW	1180 MW	3150 MW	2015-12-24	2022-12-27	2023-01-10	2023-03-25	
Fangchenggang 4	PWR / HPR1000	1000 MW	1180 MW	3150 MW	2016-12-23	2024-04-03	2024-04-09	2024-05-25	
Fangchenggang 5	PWR / HPR1000	1000 MW	1180 MW	3150 MW					
Fangchenggang 6	PWR / HPR1000	1000 MW	1180 MW	3150 MW					

== See also ==
- Generation III reactor
