= China Nuclear International Uranium Corporation =

Chinese state-owned uranium exploration company

- Native name: 中国国核海外铀资源开发公司
- Company type: State-owned enterprise
- Industry: Uranium mining and exploration
- Founded: 2006
- Headquarters: China
- Parent: China National Nuclear Corporation
- Website: China National Nuclear Corporation

The China Nuclear International Uranium Corporation (Chinese: 中国国核海外铀资源开发公司), abbreviated as SinoU or Sino-U, is a Chinese state-owned enterprise engaged in the exploration, development, and mining of overseas uranium resources. It operates as a subsidiary of the China National Nuclear Corporation (CNNC).

SinoU plays a key role in China's national strategy to secure fuel supplies for its expanding fleet of nuclear power plants. The CNNC, as the parent company, manages the nuclear fuel cycle and operates most of China's commercial nuclear reactors. Through SinoU, China aims to reduce its reliance on foreign uranium producers and increase its presence in uranium-rich regions, particularly in Africa and Central Asia.

== History ==
China Nuclear International Uranium Corporation was established in 2006 following its spin-off from the CNNC's Overseas Uranium Exploitation Department. Its creation reflected a strategic move by China to secure overseas uranium supplies to support the country's growing civilian nuclear energy program.

== Operations ==
=== Niger ===
SinoU's first major overseas investment was in the Azelik uranium project in Niger, a joint venture with the Nigerien state-owned mining company, Société des mines d'Azelik (SOMINA). The project, located at Teguida, was intended to break the four-decade monopoly of French nuclear firm Areva (now Orano) in Niger's uranium sector.

SinoU signed an agreement in 2007 and began development of the Azelik uranium mine and processing plant, with initial production originally targeted for 2010. However, progress was hampered by security issues linked to the Second Tuareg Rebellion. In July 2007, a SinoU official was kidnapped by Tuareg rebels and later released, prompting the suspension of site activities in August 2007.

Despite these challenges, limited production at Azelik began in 2011, although the site never reached full design capacity. The project has since faced financing constraints, falling uranium prices, and governance issues.

=== Namibia ===
SinoU has also participated in early-stage exploration activities in Namibia, another uranium-rich country. While no producing assets have yet emerged, the company has expressed long-term interest in expanding its portfolio in southern Africa to complement its Niger operations.
