= Changjiang Nuclear Power Plant =

Nuclear power plant in China

- Official name: 昌江核电站
- Country: People's Republic of China
- Location: Changjiang, Hainan
- Coordinates: 19°27′38.7″N 108°53′59.70″E
- Status: Operational
- Construction began: 2010
- Commission date: 25 December 2015
- Construction cost: Unit 1&2: CNY20 billion (US$3 billion); Unit 3&4: CNY40 billion (USD6.4 billion)
- Owners: China National Nuclear Corporation, China Huaneng Group
- Operator: China National Nuclear Corporation

Nuclear power station
- Reactor type: PWR
- Cooling source: Gulf of Tonkin

Power generation
- Units operational: 2 × 650 MW; 1 × 1197 MW
- Units under const.: 1 × 1197 MW; 1 × 125 MW
- Nameplate capacity: 2,427 MW
- Annual net output: 7,452 GW·h

External links
- Commons: Related media on Commons

Changjiang Nuclear Power Plant (Chinese: 昌江核电站) is a nuclear power plant in Tangxing Village of Haiwei Township, Changjiang Li Autonomous County in the province of Hainan. It is the first power plant of its kind in the province.

== History ==
Construction of the first phase of the plant which consists of two reactors was approved by the National Development and Reform Commission in July 2008. Site works began in December 2008 and the first concrete was poured at the first unit on 25 April 2010. The plant was built by China National Nuclear Corporation and China Huaneng Group. Unit 1 was connected to the electricity grid on 7 November 2015 and is commercially operating starting on 25 December 2015.

In July 2019 China National Nuclear Corporation announced it would start building a demonstration ACP100 small modular reactor on the north-west side of the site by the end of the year.

== Technical features ==
The plant will be built in two phases, both consisting of two CNP-600 pressurized water reactors, with a capacity of 650 MW each. The first unit was connected to the grid November 7, 2015 and second unit June 20, 2016. More than 70% of the equipment was planned to be indigenously made.

== Phase II ==
On September 2, 2020, Premier Li Keqiang of the State Council presided over an executive meeting of the State Council. The meeting approved the Hainan Changjiang Nuclear Power Phase II project. According to China Huanenghe, total planned investment of the project is CNY40 billion (USD6.4 billion).

Unit 3 is scheduled to pour the nuclear island's first concrete in August 2020 and will be completed in 2025; Unit 3 has attained a sustained chain reaction for the first time in Jul 10, 2026. Unit 3 connect to grid in August 1, 2026, and started commercially operation in September 17, 2026.

Unit 4 is scheduled to pour the nuclear island's first concrete in May 2021 and will be completed in 2026.

== Reactor data ==
Unit	Type	Net power	Gross power	Thermal power	Construction start	First criticality	Grid connection	Operation start	Notes
Phase I
1	CNP-600	601	650	1930	2010-04-25	2015-10-12	2015-11-07	2015-12-25	
2	CNP-600	601	650	1930	2010-11-21	2016-06-09	2016-06-20	2016-08-12	
Phase II
3	Hualong One	1000	1197	3190	2021-03-31	2026-07-10	2026-08-01	2026-09-17	
4	Hualong One	1000	1197	3190	2021-12-28			2026	
SMR
5	Linglong One	100	125	385	2021-07-13			2026	

== Pumped storage hydroelectricity ==
The 600 MW Hainan Qiongzhong pumped-storage hydroelectric plant helps to balance the nuclear plant by absorbing nighttime production and generating electricity during the day.

== See also ==
- List of major power stations in Hainan province
- Nuclear power in China
- List of nuclear reactors#China
