= Qinshan Nuclear Power Plant =

Nuclear power plant in Zhejiang Province, China

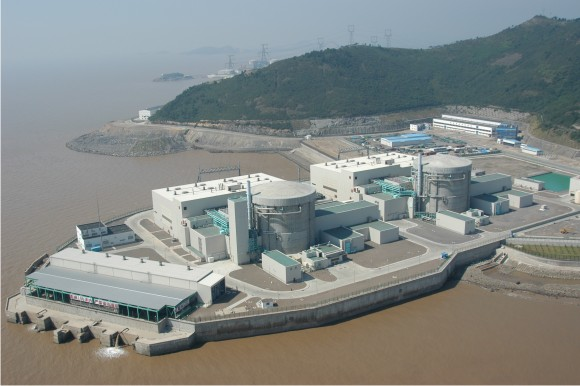
- Qinshan Phase III Units 1 & 2
- Country: China
- Location: Qinshan, Zhejiang
- Coordinates: 30°25′59″N 120°57′0″E
- Status: Operational
- Construction began: March 20, 1985 (I); June 2, 1996 (II-1); April 1, 1997 (II-2); April 28, 2006 (II-3); January 28, 2007 (II-4); June 8, 1998 (III-1); September 25, 1998 (III-2)
- Commission date: April 1, 1994 (I); April 15, 2002 (II-1); May 3, 2004 (II-2); October 5, 2010 (II-3); December 30, 2011 (II-4); December 31, 2002 (III-1); July 24, 2003 (III-2)
- Owners: Qinshan Nuclear Power; Nuclear Power Plant Qinshan Joint Venture Company; The Third Qinshan Joint Venture Company
- Operators: CNNC Nuclear Operation Management; Nuclear Power Plant Qinshan Joint Venture Company; The Third Qinshan Joint Venture Company

Nuclear power station
- Reactor type: PWR (I; II 1–4); CANDU PHWR (III 1–2)
- Reactor supplier: China National Nuclear Corporation (I; II 1–4); Atomic Energy of Canada Limited (III 1–2)
- Cooling source: Hangzhou Bay
- Thermal capacity: 1 × 966 MW_{th} 4 × 1930 MW_{th} 2 × 2064 MW_{th}

Power generation
- Units operational: 1 × 308 MW; 2 × 610 MW; 2 × 619 MW; 2 × 677 MW
- Make and model: 1 × CNP-300 (I); 4 × CNP-600 (II 1–4); 2 × CANDU 6 (III 1–2)
- Nameplate capacity: 4110 MW
- Capacity factor: 90.59% (2017); 88.21% (lifetime)
- Annual net output: 32,614 GWh (2017)

External links
- Commons: Related media on Commons

The Qinshan Nuclear Power Plant (秦山核电站) is a multi-unit nuclear power plant in Qinshan Town, Haiyan County, in Jiaxing, Zhejiang province, China.

It is the first nuclear power plant in mainland China, with a total capacity of 6.546 million kWh.

== Development ==
The construction of the units involved three separate phases.

Phase I
Phase I has an annual power generation capacity of 1.7 billion kWh. It involved construction of the small-scale (≈300 MW) Unit-1 only, but was the first domestically designed and constructed nuclear power plant in the nation (95 percent of components came from domestic manufactures). Its preliminary design was completed in October 1983. The first concrete was poured on May 20, 1985, marking the start of full-scale construction. The unit connected to the grid at 00:15 on December 15, 1991. After two years of testing, it reached its designed capacity in December 1993. It entered commercial operation in April 1994 and passed completion acceptance in July 1995.

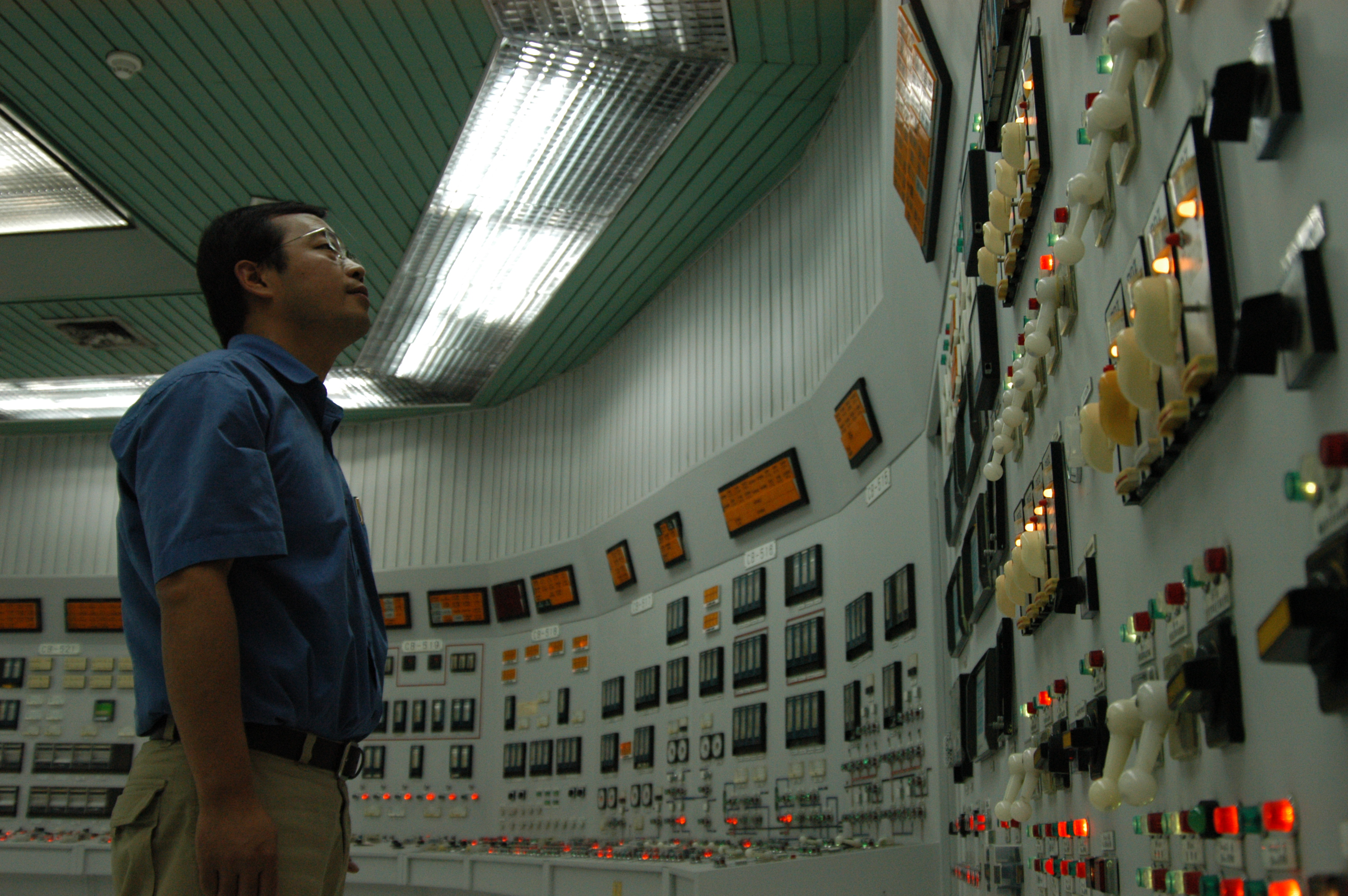
Phase I Control Room

Phase II
The next set of reactors were mid-scale plants (≈600 MW) but still of Chinese design (CNP-600). The steam generators were made by Babcock & Wilcox of Cambridge, Ontario, Canada. Units 1 and 2 of this phase started construction on June 2, 1996 and March 23, 1997, respectively. They were put into commercial operation on April 15, 2002 and May 3, 2004, respectively. Units 3 and 4 started construction on April 28, 2006 and entered operation in 2010 and 2011 respectively.

Phase III
Involved construction of two 728 MW (gross) CANDU-6 series of the CANDU reactor design supplied by Atomic Energy of Canada Limited. This was reported to be the largest business venture between Canada and China to that time. In 2001, it was visited by the Canadian Prime Minister Jean Chrétien; both units were online by 2003.

Although Fangjiashan Nuclear Power Plant is technically a separate entity from Qinshan, the World Nuclear Association considers it to essentially be an extension of the Qinshan plant due to their proximity and the fact that the original two reactors built at Fangjiashan were initially intended to be built at Qinshan phase IV (which is no longer planned).

== Reactor data ==
Reactors
Unit	Type	Model	Net power (MWe)	Gross power (MWe)	Thermal power (MW_{t})	Start construction	First criticality	Grid connection	Commercial operation	Notes
Phase I
Qinshan I	PWR	CNP-300	328 (308)	350 (330)	966	1985-3-20	1991-10-31	1991-12-15	1994-4-1	
Phase II
Qinshan II-1	PWR	CNP-600	610	650	1930	1996-6-2	2001-11-15	2002-2-6	2002-4-15	
Qinshan II-2	PWR	CNP-600	668 (610)	708 (650)	1930	1997-4-1	2004-2-25	2004-3-11	2004-4-3	
Qinshan II-3	PWR	CNP-600	619	660	1930	2006-4-28	2010-7-13	2010-8-1	2010-10-5	
Qinshan II-4	PWR	CNP-600	619	660	1930	2007-1-28	2011-11-17	2011-12-25	2011-12-30	
Phase III
Qinshan III-1	PHWR	CANDU 6	677	728	2064	1998-6-8	2002-9-21	2002-11-19	2002-12-31	
Qinshan III-2	PHWR	CANDU 6	677	728	2064	1998-9-25	2003-1-18	2003-6-12	2003-7-24	

In 2019 Qinshan 1 was upgraded and uprated to 350 MWe (net) from its original output power of 300 MWe.

In March 2025, Qinshan II-2 was upgraded to 708MWe (gross) from 650MWe after 20 year's maintanace.

== See also ==
- Fangjiashan Nuclear Power Plant
- List of power stations in China
- Nuclear power in China
