= China Atomic Energy Authority =

Chinese regulatory agency

- 国家原子能机构; Guójiā Yuánzǐnéng Jīgòu

Agency overview
- Formed: 1999 - 2000
- Superseding agency: China National Nuclear Corporation Commission of Science, Technology and Industry for National Defense (COSTIND)
- Type: Regulatory agency
- Jurisdiction: China
- Headquarters: Beijing
- Agency executives: Xu Dazhe, Chairman; Liu Yongde, Secretary General
- Parent agency: State Council
- Website: www.caea.gov.cn

China Atomic Energy Authority (CAEA; Chinese: 国家原子能机构; pinyin: Guójiā Yuánzǐnéng Jīgòu) is the regulatory agency that oversees the development of nuclear energy in the People's Republic of China.

== History ==
The agency was created out of the regulatory functions department of the China National Nuclear Corporation in 1999 - 2000.

== Agency structure ==
=== The Administration Department ===
This department is responsible for logistics and safeguards for the CAEA, and the management on physical protection for nuclear material and fire protection for the nuclear power plants.

=== The System Engineering Department ===
This department administers the on major nuclear R&D projects, creating development plan for nuclear power plants and nuclear fuels. It is also responsible for the construction, management and supervision of nuclear projects, and routine work of nuclear emergencies.

=== Department of International Cooperation ===
It is responsible for organizing and coordinating the exchange and cooperation with governments and international organizations and licensing for nuclear export and import and issuing governmental permits.

=== The General Planning Department ===
This department is responsible for approving the draft plan for nuclear energy, and drawing up the annual plan for nuclear energy development.

=== The Science, Technology and Quality Control Department ===
This department is responsible for organizing pre-study on nuclear energy and mapping out nuclear technical criteria.

== See also ==
- International Atomic Energy Agency
- Electricity sector in China
