= Generation II reactor =

Design classification for nuclear reactors

Generation II reactor vessels size comparison.

A generation II reactor is a design classification for a nuclear reactor, and refers to the class of commercial reactors built until the end of the 1990s. Prototypical and older versions of PWR, CANDU, IPHWR, BWR, AGR, RBMK and VVER are among them.

These are contrasted to generation I reactors, which refer to the early prototype of power reactors, such as Shippingport, Magnox/UNGG, AMB, Fermi 1, and Dresden 1. The last commercial Gen I power reactor was located at the Wylfa Nuclear Power Station and ceased operation at the end of 2015. The nomenclature for reactor designs, describing four 'generations', was proposed by the US Department of Energy when it introduced the concept of generation IV reactors.

The designation generation II+ reactor is sometimes used for modernized generation II designs built post-2000, such as the Chinese CPR-1000, in competition with more expensive generation III reactor designs. Typically, the modernization includes improved safety systems and a 60-year design life.

Generation II reactor designs generally had an original design life of 30 or 40 years. This date was set as the period over which loans taken out for the plant would be paid off. However, many generation II reactors are being life-extended to 50 or 60 years, and a second life-extension to 80 years may also be economical in many cases. By 2013 about 75% of still operating U.S. reactors had been granted life extension licenses to 60 years.

Chernobyl's No.4 reactor that exploded was a generation II reactor, specifically RBMK-1000.

Fukushima Daiichi's three destroyed reactors were generation II reactors; specifically Mark I Boiling water reactors (BWR) designed by General Electric. In 2016, unit 2 at the Watts Bar Nuclear Generating Station came online and is likely to be the last generation II reactor to become operational in the United States.

Many generation II PWRs built by American firms are custom designed for each specific plant, such as those built by Babcock&Wilcox, Combustion Engineering, and Westinghouse. In contrast, with BWRs, CANDUs, in France, Japan, Sweden, and in the Soviet Union with the VVER and the RBMK, reactor designs were highly standardized, allowing parts to be retrofitted and exchanged across plants. In Germany, BWRs and PWRs were highly standardized, designed by KWU with the exception of the Pre-Konvoi PWR reactors which were not standarized.

Asea-atom, later ABB-atom, in Sweden, developed the standarized BWR-75 reactor design, of which 6 were built.

== See also ==
- List of reactor types
- OPR-1000
- System 80
- Pre-Konvoi
- Konvoi
- SNUPPS
