= China National Nuclear Corporation =

Chinese state-owned enterprise

- Native name: 中国核工业集团公司
- Type: State-owned enterprise
- Industry: Nuclear technology
- Predecessor: Ministry of Nuclear Industry
- Founded: 1955
- Headquarters: Beijing, China
- Key people: Sun Qin (President)
- Products: Nuclear weapons, nuclear power generation
- Revenue: US$ 39.6 billion (2023)
- Net income: US$ 1.3 billion (2023)
- Total assets: US$ 188.6 billion (2023)
- Owner: Government of China
- Number of employees: 182,750 (2023)
- Subsidiaries: China Nuclear International Uranium Corporation; Nuctech
- Website: en.cnnc.com.cn

China National Nuclear Corporation
- Simplified Chinese: 中国核工业集团公司
- Traditional Chinese: 中國核工業集團公司
Transcriptions
Standard Mandarin
- Hanyu Pinyin: Zhōngguó Hégōngyè Jítuán Gōngsī

The China National Nuclear Corporation (CNNC; Chinese: 中国核工业集团公司; pinyin: Zhōngguó Hé Gōngyè Jítuán Gōngsī) is a state-owned enterprise founded in 1955 in Beijing. CNNC's president and vice-president are appointed by the Premier of the People's Republic of China. CNNC oversees all aspects of China's civilian and military nuclear programs. According to its own mission statement, it "is a main part of the national nuclear technology industry and a leading element of national strategic nuclear forces and nuclear energy development."

Its headquarters are in Xicheng District, Beijing.

== History ==
The Ministry of Nuclear Industry built China's first atom bomb, hydrogen bomb and nuclear submarine. It functioned as a government bureau for the national nuclear industry and reported directly to the State Council. It oversaw China's nuclear-related corporations, manufacturers, institutions, research institutes, and plants, including those related to nuclear weapons. It was responsible for the design and operation of nuclear power plants; nuclear fuel production and supply, including the processing of natural uranium, uranium conversion and enrichment, fuel assembly fabrication, spent fuel reprocessing, and nuclear waste disposal.

In 1988 the Ministry of Nuclear Industry was re-organised and became the CNNC. The corporatization was partly carried out to gain funds from outside of the government via exports.

In the mid-1990s, CNNC had 300,000 employees and managed 200 organisations.

Kang Rixin, a senior general manager is currently being investigated (as of August 10, 2009) for $260 million that was earmarked for the construction of three nuclear plants and allegedly used the funds for the stock market sustaining heavy losses. He is also accused of accepting bribes from a foreign company that intended to build nuclear power stations in China.

As of 2014 CNNC has 100,000 employees and 110 subsidiaries. It has 4 nuclear power plants with 9 reactors in operation with a generation capacity of 6.5 GWe, with a further 12 reactors under construction.

In June 2015, CNNC announced it would aim to raise 13.19 billion Chinese yuan in an initial public offering, that if successful, would be the largest in China in almost four years previously. In September 2015, CNNC signed a memorandum of understanding with Bill Gates-backed TerraPower for the construction of a traveling wave reactor.

In September, CNNC announced a project with the UK's National Nuclear Laboratory to create the Joint Research and Innovation Centre. The centre will investigate aspects of the nuclear fuel cycle. The UK and China will jointly fund the project over five years at the cost of £50 million.

As of 2017, CNNC was developing a 400 MW_{th} heat-only reactor for district heating.

In 2018, CNNC acquired nuclear power plant builder China Nuclear Engineering & Construction Corp (CNECC).

It is one of the two most significant companies in China's uranium mining and nuclear power sectors (the other being China General Nuclear Power Group). CNNC is supervised by the State Council via the State-owned Assets Supervision and Administration Commission.

=== U.S. sanctions ===
In August 2020, the United States Department of Defense published the names of companies linked to the People's Liberation Army operating directly or indirectly in the United States. CNNC and CNECC were included on the list. In November 2020, Donald Trump issued an executive order prohibiting any American company or individual from owning shares in companies that the United States Department of Defense has listed as having links to the People's Liberation Army, which included the two companies above.

== Reactor designs ==
CNNC is the only exporter of Chinese nuclear power plants.

=== CNP / ACP series ===
The CNP Generation II nuclear reactors (and Generation III successor ACP) were a series of nuclear reactors developed by China National Nuclear Corporation (CNNC), and are predecessors of the more current Hualong One design.

The CNP series of Generation II reactors started with the CNP-300 pressurized water reactor, was the first reactor design developed domestically in China. The first unit began operation at Qinshan Nuclear Power Plant in 1991.

A larger version of the reactor, the CNP-600 was developed based on both the CNP-300 and the M310 reactor design used in Daya Bay Nuclear Power Plant. It was installed at Changjiang Nuclear Power Plant, with two units operational from 2015 and 2016, respectively. A Generation III ACP-600 successor was also developed but none were built.

A three loop, 1000-MW version of the CNP reactor, the CNP-1000, was under development since the 1990s with the help of vendors Westinghouse and Framatome (now AREVA). 4 units of the CNP-1000 were later built at Fuqing NPP. Further work on the CNP-1000 was stopped in favour of the ACP-1000.

In 2013, China announced that it had independently developed the Generation III ACP-1000, with Chinese authorities claiming full intellectual property rights over the design. As a result of the success of the Hualong One project, no ACP-1000 reactors have been built to date. CNNC had originally planned to use the ACP-1000 in Fuqing reactor 5 and 6 but switched over to the Hualong One.

=== Hualong One ===
In 2012, central planners in Beijing directed China General Nuclear (CGN) and the other large nuclear builder and operator, CNNC to 'rationalise' their Generation III reactor design programs. This meant CGN's ACPR1000 and CNNC's ACP1000, both of which were based on the French Generation II M310, were 'merged' into one standardised design - the Hualong One. After the merger, both companies retain their own supply chain and their versions of the Hualong One will differ slightly (units built by CGN will retain some features from the ACPR1000) but the design is considered to be standardised. Some 85% of its components will be made domestically.

The Hualong One power output will be 1170 MWe gross, 1090 MWe net, with a 60-year design life, and would use a combination of passive and active safety systems with a double containment. It has a 177 assembly core design with an 18-month refuelling cycle. The power plant's utilisation rate is as high as 90%. CNNC has said its active and passive safety systems, double-layer containment and other technologies meet the highest international safety standards.

The Hualong One is now largely seen as the replacement for all previous Chinese nuclear reactor designs, and has been exported overseas.

=== Hualong Two ===
CNNC plans to start building Hualong Two by 2024. It will be a more economical version using similar technology, taking a year less to build with about a quarter less in construction costs.

=== Advanced CANDU reactor ===
In September 2016 it was announced that SNC-Lavalin has signed an agreement in principle with CNNC and the Shanghai Electric Group to design, market and build the advanced CANDU reactor. Its ability to use reprocessed uranium will reduce China's stock of spent nuclear fuel.

=== DHR-400 ===
CNNC has developed a pool-type light-water reactor for district heating, called the DHR-400 (District Heating Reactor 400 MWt). It operates at low temperature and air pressure, so is easy to operate and decommission. Building cost is 1.5 billion yuan ($230 million), taking three years to build. It is well suited for the existing centralised heating systems of northern Chinese cities, currently often coal fueled.

In February 2019, China's State Power Investment Corporation (SPIC) signed a cooperation agreement with the Baishan municipal government in Jilin province for the Baishan Nuclear Energy Heating Demonstration Project, which would use a DHR-400.

=== ACP100 ===
Design of the ACP100 started in 2010. The pressurized water reactor (PWR) has a fully integrated reactor module with an internal coolant system, with a 2-year refueling interval, producing 385 MWt and about 125 MWe. The preliminary design was completed in 2014. In July 2019, CNNC announced the start of the construction of a ACP100 small modular demonstration reactor, named the Linglong One, on the north-west side of the existing Changjiang Nuclear Power Plant by the end of the year. The construction was expected to take 65 months and the unit to be started up by 31 May 2025. The start of the construction would be on 31 December 2019. In July 2021 the start of the construction of the first commercial onshore nuclear project was announced, about four years later than planned. By March 2023, the main internal structure of the reactor building was completed. The core module was installed in August 2023.

== See also ==
- China Atomic Energy Authority
- Nuclear power in China
- China Nuclear International Uranium Corporation
- China General Nuclear Power Group
- CNNC International Limited
