= Wei Chuanzhong =

Chinese politician

- 魏传忠

Deputy Director of the General Administration of Quality Supervision, Inspection and Quarantine
- In office April 2007 – July 2014
- Director: Li Changjiang→Wang Yong→Zhi Shuping

Director of Beijing Entry-Exit Inspection and Quarantine Bureau
- In office September 2000 – April 2007

Personal details
- Born: April 1954 (age 72) Yanggu County, Shandong, China
- Party: Chinese Communist Party (expelled; 1981-2019)
- Education: Shandong Agricultural University

Chinese name
- Traditional Chinese: 魏傳忠
- Simplified Chinese: 魏传忠
Transcriptions
Standard Mandarin
- Hanyu Pinyin: Wèi Chuánzhōng

Wei Chuanzhong (Chinese: 魏传忠; born April 1954) is a retired Chinese politician. He was investigated by China's top anti-graft agency in March 2019, almost five years after his retirement. Previously he had served as deputy director of the General Administration of Quality Supervision, Inspection and Quarantine. He was director of the Chinese Society of Inspection and Quarantine.

== Biography ==
Wei was born in Yanggu County, Shandong, in April 1954. In September 1975, he entered Shandong Agricultural University, where he majored in forestry. After graduating in August 1977, he joined the Liaocheng Municipal Forestry Bureau as a technician. And he served in several posts in Liaocheng, including government office secretary (1984-1987), Chinese Communist Party Deputy Committee Secretary of tuberculosis control hospital (1987-1988), deputy director of commodity inspection bureau (1988-1988), and director of commodity inspection bureau (1988-1995). In February 1995, he was transferred to Beijing and appointed director of the Office of State Commodity Inspection Bureau, which was reshuffled as State Administration for Entry-Exit Inspection and Quarantine in October 1998. In April 2000 he became the deputy director of Beijing Entry-Exit Inspection and Quarantine Bureau, rising to director in September of that same year. In April 2007, he was elevated to deputy director of the General Administration of Quality Supervision, Inspection and Quarantine, a position he held for more than seven years until his retirement in July 2014.

== Investigation ==
On March 15, 2019, he has been placed under investigation for "serious violations of laws and regulations" by the Central Commission for Discipline Inspection (CCDI), the Chinese Communist Party's internal disciplinary body, and the National Supervisory Commission, the highest anti-corruption agency of China. He was expelled from the CCP and was stripped of retirement benefits on 7 September. He was detained on 23 September. On June 19, 2020, Chenzhou Intermediate People's Court held a court session to try his case, the court identified the defendant made use of his work position to seek benefits of more than 120 million yuan ($17 million) from 2001 to 2019. He was sentenced to life imprisonment for consorting with some private enterprise owners and using his power and influence to seek benefits for them, trading power for money unscrupulously, seeking benefits for others in getting industrial production licenses and project biddings and accepting a huge amount of money and gifts.
