= Medal of the Oriental Republic of Uruguay =

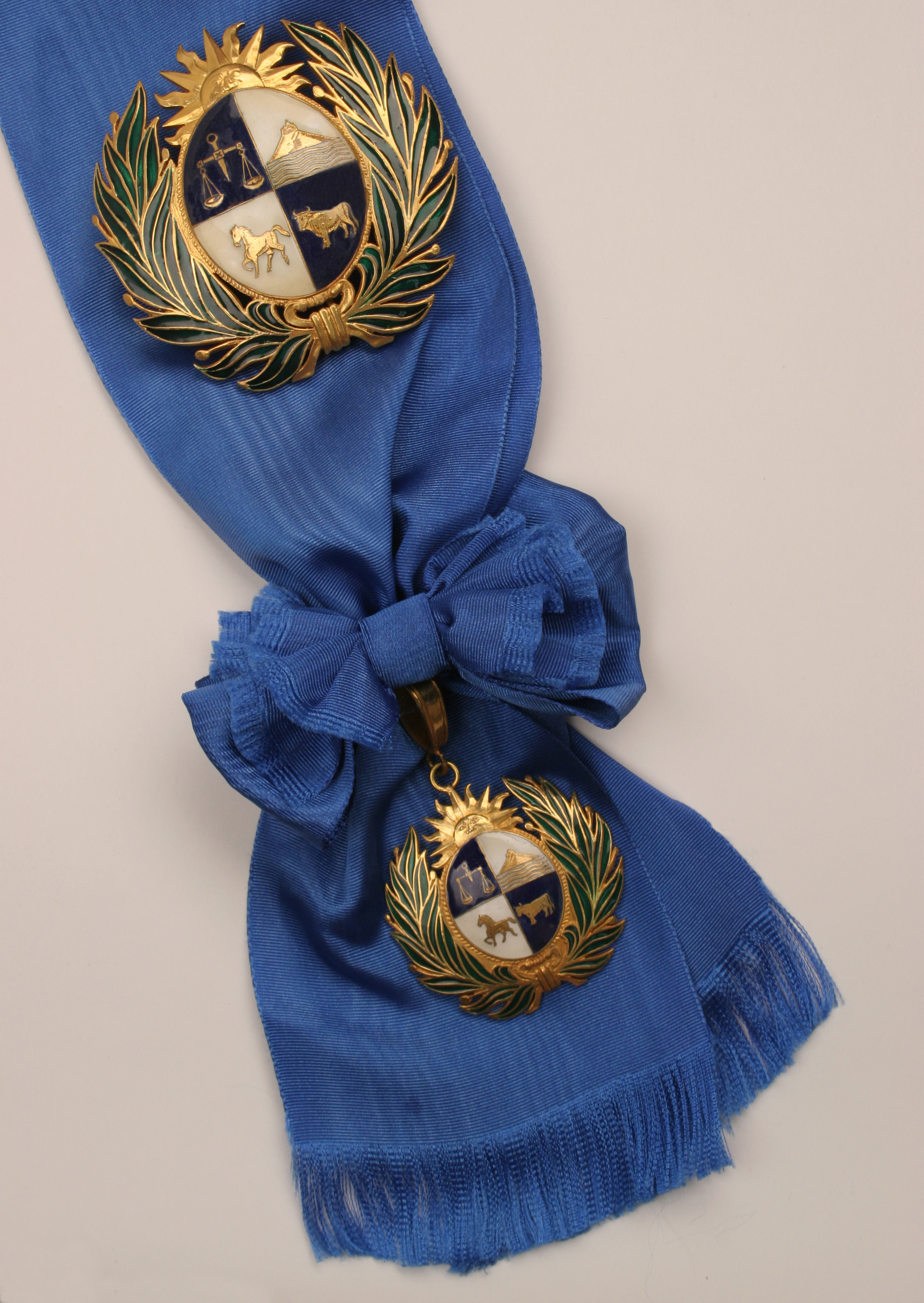
- Awarded for: Reciprocity reasons
- Sponsored by: Presidency of Uruguay
- Country: Uruguay
- Established: August 28, 1992
- First award: 1993

The Medal of the Oriental Republic of Uruguay (Spanish: Medalla de la República Oriental del Uruguay) is a distinction of Uruguay created in 1992 by Law No. 16300 and awarded by the President of Uruguay at the initiative of the Ministry of Foreign Affairs to foreign personalities, on the principle of protocol reciprocity.

The law by which it was created, on August 28, 1992, establishes that the executive power is authorized to mint the medal, with the objective that the Presidency, at the initiative of the Ministry of Foreign Affairs, deliver it to foreign personalities with reasons reciprocity, previously reporting to the General Assembly, and entrusts the executive power with the regulation of the registration, design, ceremony and other matters of the medal. The regulation of the law was given by Decree No. 132/993 of March 16, 1993, which approves the Regulation of the Medal.

== Characteristics ==
The distinction consists of the medal and the diploma. The medal is characterized by having on its forehead the national coat of arms, made of 24-karat gold-plated metal with dimensions of 65 millimeters high by 60 millimeters wide. Its Sun is carved, the laurel and olive leaves accompany the oval of the coat of arms in half a carved point, and its center have a "bulge", with white and blue enameled colors with a glass finish. The reverse of it contains the text "Oriental Republic of Uruguay" in relief and with a diameter of 41 millimeters, and in the center the text "Medal of the Republic" in relief, straight in three lines.

To reward the medal there is a public act directed by the president of the republic, who rewards the medal along with a diploma signed by himself. If award is not possible because the beneficiary is abroad, it can be done by a person designated by the executive power.

== Recipients ==
| Recipients | Rfs. |
1993
| Mexico – President Carlos Salinas de Gortari | |
| Brazil – President Itamar Franco | |
| Costa Rica – President Rafael Ángel Calderón Fournier | |
1994
| Spain – President of the Regional Government of Galicia Manuel Fraga Iribarne | |
| Argentina – President Carlos Saúl Menem | |
1995
| Poland – President Lech Wałęsa | |
| Brazil – President Fernando Henrique Cardoso | |
| Italy – President Oscar Luigi Scalfaro | |
| Argentina – Ambassador Alicia Martínez Ríos | |
| Bolivia – Minister of Foreign Affairs Antonio Aranibar Quiroga | |
| Venezuela – President Rafael Caldera | |
| Chile – Minister of Foreign Affairs José Miguel Insulza Salinas | |
| Paraguay – Minister of Foreign Affairs Luis María Ramírez Boettner | |
| Mexico – Secretary of Foreign Affairs José Ángel Gurría Treviño | |
1996
| Lithuania – President Algirdas Brazauskas | |
| Brazil – Ambassador Renato Prado Guimarães | |
| United Nations – Director-General of the Food and Agriculture Organization Jacques Diouf | |
| Romania – President Ion Iliescu | |
| Paraguay – President Juan Carlos Wasmosy | |
| Chile – President Eduardo Frei Ruiz-Tagle | |
| Malaysia – Prime Minister Mahathir Mohamad | |
| Mexico – President Ernesto Zedillo Ponce de León | |
| France – President Jacques Chirac | |
| Brazil – Vice President Marco Maciel | |
| Malaysia – King Ja'afar of Negeri Sembilan | |
| Spain – King Juan Carlos I | |
Spain – Queen Sofía
| Czech Republic – President Václav Havel | |
| Panama – Minister of Foreign Affairs Ricardo Alberto Arias | |
| Panama – President Ernesto Pérez Balladares | |
| Spain – Minister of Foreign Affairs Abel Matutes Juan | |
| South Africa – Ambassador Vaughan C. R. Dewing | |
1997
| Spain – Viscount of the Castle of Almasa Fernando de Almasa | |
| Belgium – Prime Minister Jean-Luc Dehaene | |
| Paraguay – Vice Minister of Foreign Affairs for Economic Affairs Antonio Félix López Acosta | |
| Brazil – Minister of Foreign Affairs Luiz Felipe Lampreia | |
| Brazil – Minister of Transport Alcides Saldanha | |
Brazil – Minister of Ministry of Industry and Foreign Trade Francisco Neves Dornelles
Brazil – Minister of Mines and Energy Raimundo Mendes Brito
Brazil – Head of the Military House Alberto Mendes Cardoso
Brazil – Governor of Rio Grande do Sul Antônio Britto
Brazil – Governor of Sergipe Albano Franco
Brazil – Ambassador Gelson Fonseca Junior
Brazil – Ambassador Affonso Emilio de Alencastro Massot
Brazil – Ambassador Luiz Augusto de Castro Neves
Brazil – Ambassador Frederico Cezar de Araujo
Brazil – Director General of the Federal Police Vicente Chelotti
Brazil – General Director of the Department of Latin American Integration Renato Luiz Rodrigues Marques
Brazil – Valter Pecly Moreira
Brazil – Marcos Borges Duprat Ribeiro
Brazil – Paulo Cesar de Olivera Campos
Brazil – Marcio Nunes Cambraia
Brazil – Undersecretary of Communications Ana Elisa Tavares de Miranda
Brazil – Colonel Walter Justus
Brazil – Colonel José Elito Carvalho
Brazil – Diplomat Luiz Gilberto Seixas de Andrade
Brazil – Diplomat María Luiza Ribeiro Viotti
Brazil – Diplomat Sérgio Danese
Brazil – Diplomat Virgínia Bernardes de Souza Toniatti
Brazil – Diplomat Virgínia Bernardes de Souza Toniatti
Brazil – Edelcio José Ansarah
Brazil – Roberto Abdala
Brazil – Lieutenant Commander Carlos Alberto de Souza Filho
Brazil – Major Ricardo Borges
Brazil – Diplomat José Humberto de Brito Cruz
Brazil – Diplomat Carlos Alexandre Ferreira
Brazil – Diplomat Rodrigo de Lima Baena Soares
Brazil – Diplomat Alan Coelho de Séllos
Brazil – Diplomat Marco Antonio Nakata
| Portugal – Minister of Foreign Affairs Jaime Gama | |
| Portugal – Prime Minister Antonio Guterres | |
| France – Minister of Culture Philippe Douste-Blazy | |
France – Minister of State Michel Barnier
France – Delegate Minister of Finance and Foreign Trade Yves Galland
France – Ambassador Jean-Francois Nougarede
France – Senator Xavier de Villepin
France – Secretary General to the President Dominique de Villepin
France – MP Nicole Catala
France – President of the France-Uruguay Friendship Group Michel Inchauspé
France – President of the France-South America Friendship Group Roland du Luart
| Ecuador – Minister of Foreign Affairs José Ayala Lasso | |
Ecuador – Coordinator of Diplomatic Affairs of the Presidency Gustavo Cordovez Pareja
Ecuador – Director of Protocol Miguel Vazco
| Ecuador – President Fabián Alarcón Rivera | |
| France – Co-organizer of the 1998 World Cup Michel Platini | |
France – Diplomatic Counselor of the Presidency Jean-David Levitte
France – Spokeswoman of the Ministry of Foreign Affairs Catherine Colonna
France – Chief of Cabinet of France Annie Lhéritier
France – Ambassador Daniel Jouanneau
| European Union – Vice-President of the European Commission Manuel Marín | |
| Argentina – Ambassador Benito Llambí | |
1998
| France – Christine Albanel | |
France – Bernard Émié
France – Jean-François Cirelli
France – Claude Chirac
France – Jean-François Lamour
France – Ambassador Alain Catta
France – Jacques de Lajugie
France – Bruno Joubert
France – Chief of Staff to the Prime Minister Maurice Gourdault-Montagne
France – President of the Midi-Pyrénées Regional Council Marc Censi
France – Jean Mallauri
France – Ex-Minister of State Paul Dijoud
France – Laurent Stefanini
France – Patrick Flot
France – Patrick Bardey
France – Pierre Petit
France – Sylvie Decroix
France – Aide-de-camp to the President Colonel Xavier Laure
France – Colonel Claude Kalfon
France – Hélèna Thomas
| France – Assistant Advisor for Communications of the Presidency Michel Baloche | |
France – Assistant Spokesperson of the Presidency Jérôme Peyrat
France – Chief of the Press Office of the Presidency Evelyne Richard
France – Technical Advisor to the Cabinet of the Ministry of Foreign Affairs François Asselineau
France – Deputy Director of South America at the Ministry of Foreign Affairs Patrick Boursin
France – Protocol Xavier Rey
France – Protocol Jacques Mari
France – Chief of the Center of Governmental Transmissions Jean-Marie Le Balc'h
France – Commander of the Security Group for the Presidency Jean-Marie Gutknecht
France – Official Interpreter Micheline Durand
France – Personal Security Officer to the President Joel Morin
France – Commander of the Protection Service of High-Ranking Officials Daniel Gatine
France – Personal Security Officer to the President Jean-Claude Pelois
France – José Pietroboni
France – Aircraft Regulator to the Presidency Ferdinand Della Vecchia
1999
| Austria – Ambassador Peter Müller | |
| Portugal – Minister of Economy Joaquim Augusto Nunes Pina Moura | |
Portugal – Secretary of State for the Portuguese Communities José Manuel Lello Ribeiro de Almeida
Portugal – Ambassador António Manuel Canastreiro Franco
Portugal – Head of the Military House of the President José Manuel Santos Faria Leal
Portugal – António Augusto Gonçalves Lopes da Fonseca
Portugal – Secretary-General of the Ministry of Foreign Trade Pedro Ribeiro de Menezes
Portugal – Director-General of Bilateral Relations João Manuel Guerra Salgueiro
Portugal – Chief of State Protocol Francisco Pessanha de Quevedo Crespo
Portugal – Chief of Staff to the Minister of Foreign Affairs Francisco María de Sousa Ribero Telles
Portugal – General Samuel Matias de Amaral
Portugal – Advisor for International Relations to the President José Filipe Moraes Cabral
Portugal – Advisor for International Relations to the President Antonio Luiz da Silva Sennflet
Portugal – Diplomatic Advisor to the Prime Minister José Joaquim Esteves dos Santos Freitas Ferraz
Portugal – Deputy Chief of State Protocol Alexandre María Lindin Vassalo
Portugal – Director of South American Services María Dinah Bandeira Santos Silva Azavedo Neves
Portugal – Advisor for International Relations to the President Carlos António Rico da Costa Neves
Portugal – Secretary of State Protocol Mónica Maria de Magalhães Moutinho
| Mexico – Secretary of Foreign Affairs Rosario Green | |
Mexico – Secretary of Commerce and Industrial Development Herminio Blanco
Mexico – Secretary of Tourism Óscar Espinosa Villarreal
Mexico – Ambassador Rogelio Granguillhome
Mexico – Chief of General Staff to the President Roberto Miranda Sánchez
Mexico – Coordinator of Advisors for Internal and External Affairs to the President José Luis Barros Horcasitas
Mexico – Director-General of Social Communication Fernando Lerdo de Tejada
Mexico – Director-General of Bancomext Enrique Vilatela
Mexico – Undersecretary of Foreign Affairs for Latin America and Asia-Pacific Carlos A. de Icaza
Mexico – Head of the Office for Trade Negotiations with Latin America, Access to Markets and the FTAA Eduardo Solís Sánchez
Mexico – Chief of Foreign Affairs Protocol Pedro González-Rubio S.
Mexico – Director-General of Foreign Affairs for Latin America and the Caribbean Francisco del Río
2000
| International Olympic Committee – President Juan Antonio Samaranch | |
| Brazil – Ambassador Luiz Augusto de Araujo Castro | |
| Paraguay – President Luis Angel González Macchi | |
| Chile – President Ricardo Lagos Escobar | |
2001
| Italy – President Carlo Azeglio Ciampi | |
| Italy – Minister of Foreign Affairs Lamberto Dini | |
| Chile – Director of Ceremony and Protocol Eduardo Araya | |
Chile – Director-General of Foreign Policy Mario Artaza
Chile – Executive Coordinator of Chile to the Mercosur Augusto Bermúdez
Chile – Program Director to the President Pedro Durán
Chile – Ambassador Carlos Klammer
Chile – Director-General of International Economic Relations Osvaldo Rosales
| Paraguay – Minister of Industry and Commerce Euclides Acevedo | |
Paraguay – Minister of Foreign Affairs Juan Esteban Aguirre
Paraguay – Director-General of State Ceremony Lincoln Alfieri
Paraguay – Secretary-General of the Presidency Jaime Bestard
Paraguay – Minister of Public Health and Social Welfare Martín Chiola
Paraguay – Ambassador Horacio Nogués
Paraguay – Chief of the Military Cabinet of the Presidency Julián Paredes
| Italy – Chief of Diplomatic Protocol Giuseppe Balboni Acqua | |
Italy – Chief Advisor to the Secretariat of the President Francesco Alfonso
Italy – Advisor for Military Affairs to the President Sergio Biraghi
Italy – Ambassador Alberto Boniver
Italy – Advisor for Foreign Affairs to the President Arrigo Levi
Italy – Coordinating Advisor of the Healthcare System to the President Gianfranco Mazuoli
Italy – Director-General of the Americas at the Ministry of Foreign Affairs Ludovico Ortona
Italy – Advisor for Communication and Information to the President Paolo Peluffo
Italy – Diplomatic Advisor to the President Antonio Puri Purini
Italy – Advisor for Internal Affairs to the President Alberto Ruffo
Italy – State Advisor to the President Salvatore Sechi
| Costa Rica – Minister of Foreign Affairs Roberto Rojas | |
| Guatemala – Minister of Foreign Affairs Gabriel Orellana | |
| Costa Rica – President Miguel Ángel Rodríguez Echeverría | |
| Dominican Republic – President Hipólito Mejía Domínguez | |
| El Salvador – Minister of Foreign Affairs María Eugenia Brizuela de Ávila | |
| Argentina – Former Minister of Foreign Affairs Adalberto Rodríguez Giavarini | |
2002
| Argentina – Consul Julio Lascano y Vedia | |
| United Nations – Director-General of the World Trade Organization Mike Moore | |
| Organization of American States – Director of the Pan American Health Organization George Alleyne | |
| Brazil – Ambassador Francisco Thompson Flores | |
| Ecuador – Minister of Foreign Affairs Heinz Moeller | |
| Spain – Minister of Defense Federico Trillo Figueroa | |
2003
| Brazil – Head of Ceremonial of the Ministry of Foreign Affairs Ruy de Lima Casaes e Silva | |
| Brazil – Undersecretary for South American Affairs Luiz Filipe de Macedo Soares Guimarães | |
| Brazil – Director-General of the Department of the Americas Antonino Lisboa Mena Goncalves | |
| Argentina – Ambassador Hernán Patiño Mayer | |
| Argentina – President Eduardo Alberto Duhalde | |
| Argentina – Minister of Foreign Affairs Carlos Ruckauf | |
| Argentina – Former Chief of the Cabinet of Ministers Alfredo Atanasof | |
| Italy – Minister of Defense Antonio Martino – (Grand Officer) | |
| Italy – Secretary General of the Presidency Gaetano Gifuni – (Grand Officer) | |
| Italy – Mayor of Rome Walter Veltroni – (Grand Officer) | |
| Italy – Head of Ceremonial of the Presidency Filippo Romano – (Commander) | |
| Italy – Ambassador Giorgio Malfatti di Montetretto – (Commander) | |
| Italy – Sub-secretary of the Foreign Ministry Mario Baccini – (Grand Officer) | |
| Italy – President of Lombardy Roberto Formigoni – (Grand Officer) | |
| Italy – Prime Minister Silvio Berlusconi – (Grand Cordon) | |
| Italy – Honorary Consul of Tuscany Silvio Fancellu – (Officer) | |
| Italy – President of the Chamber of Deputies Pier Ferdinando Casini – (Grand Cordon) | |
| Italy – Minister of Foreign Affairs Franco Frattini – (Grand Officer) | |
| Italy – President of the Senate Marcello Pera – (Grand Cordon) | |
| Italy – Director of the South America Office Giorgio Di Pietrogiacomo – (Commander) | |
| Italy – President of Tuscany Claudio Martini – (Grand Officer) | |
| China – Head of the AQSIQ Li Changjiang – (Grand Officer) | |
| Colombia – President Álvaro Uribe Vélez – (Grand Cordon) | |
2004
| India – Chairman of Tata Group Ratan Tata – (Commander) | |
| Brazil – Minister of Defense José Viegas Filho | |
| Brazil – Governor of Rio Grande do Sul Germano Rigotto | |
| Italy – Honorary Consul of Uruguay in Padua-Venice Angelo Ferro | |
| United States – Ambassador Martin J. Silverstein | |
| United States – Chairman of the Public Company Accounting Oversight Board William Joseph McDonough | |
United States – Executive Vice President of the International Affairs and Emerging Markets Group Terrence Checki
| Argentina – Ambassador delegate in the negotiations of the Rio de la Plata Treaty Guillermo de la Plaza | |
2005
| United States – Under Secretary of the Treasury for International Affairs John B. Taylor | |
2006
| China – Ambassador Wang Yongzhan | |
| Brazil – Ambassador Eduardo Dos Santos | |
| Chile – President Michelle Bachelet | |
| Venezuela – President Hugo Chávez Frías | |
| France – Ambassador Laurent Joseph Rapin | |
| Chile – Ambassador Carlos Appelgren | |
| Bolivia – Foreign Minister David Choquehuanca | |
| Paraguay – Foreign Minister Rubén Ramírez Lezcano | |
2009
| Qatar – Ambassador to the UN Nassir Abdulaziz Al-Nasser | |
| European Union – Former Head of the Delegation of the European Communities to the GATT Van-Thinh Paul Trân | |
2011
| United Nations – Secretary-General Ban Ki-moon | |
2012
| Argentina – Member of the National Academy of Fine Arts Nicolás García Uriburu | |
2016
| France – President François Hollande | |
| China – Minister of Foreign Affairs Wang Yi | |
| China – Visual artist Yuan Xikun | |
| China – Minister of Commerce Gao Hucheng | |
| China – Minister of the General Administration of Quality Supervision, Inspection and Quarantine Zhi Shuping | |
| Chile – Heraldo Muñoz Valenzuela – (Grand Officer) | |
2017
| Bolivia – President of the CAF – Development Bank of Latin America L. Enrique Garcia | |
2018
| Mexico – President Enrique Peña Nieto | |
| Brazil – Ambassador Hadil Fontes da Rocha Vianna | |
| Japan – Prime Minister Shinzo Abe | |
| China – Foreign Minister Wang Yi | |
2019
| United Nations – Director-General of the Food and Agriculture Organization José Graziano da Silva | |
