= Mining industry of China =

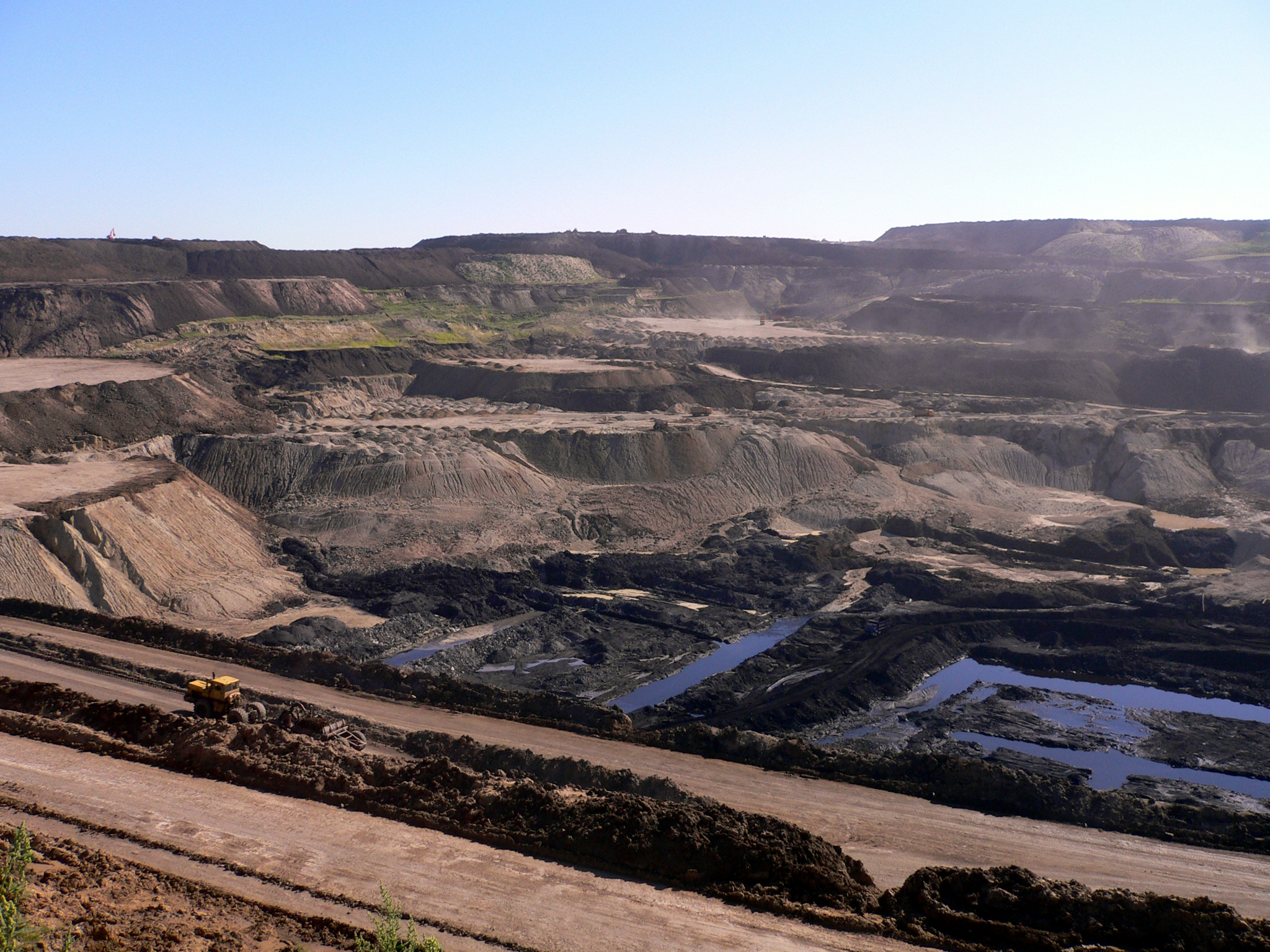
A coal mine near Hailar District

As of 2022, more than 200 types of minerals are actively explored or mined in the People's Republic of China (PRC). These resources are widely but not evenly distributed throughout the country. Taken as a whole, China's economy and exports do not rely on the mining industry, but the industry is critical to various subnational governments of the PRC.

Mining is extensively regulated in the PRC and involves numerous regulatory bodies. The state owns all mineral rights, regardless of the ownership of the land on which the minerals are located. Mining rights can be obtained upon government approval, and payment of mining and prospecting fees.

During the Mao Zedong era, mineral exploration and mining was limited to state-owned enterprises and collectively owned enterprises and private exploration of mineral resources was largely prohibited. The industry was opened to private enterprises during the reform and opening up in the 1980s and became increasingly marketized in the 1990s. In the mid-2000s, the Chinese government sought to consolidate the industry due to concerns about underutilization of resources, workplace safety, and environmental harm. During that period, state-owned enterprises purchased smaller privately owned mines. China's mining industry grew substantially and the period from the early 2000s to 2012 is often referred to as a "golden decade" in the mining industry.

== Overview ==
China's mineral resources include fuel (such as coal, oil, and natural gas), nonfuel metals, and nonmetal minerals. As of 2022, more than 200 types of minerals in China are actively explored or mined. The country is both a major producer and a major consumer of mineral resources.

Its mineral resources are widely but not evenly distributed throughout the country. Although China's national economy and exports do not rely extensively on mineral production, various subnational governments rely heavily on the mining and resources industry. Regions where mining is a major part of the economy include: Shanxi province, Jiangxi province, Henan province, Inner Mongolia Autonomous Region, and Xinjiang Autonomous Region. Mega mining sites in China include Baiyin silver mine, Tongling copper mine, Dexing copper mine, Dachang tin mine, and Jinchuan nickel and cobalt mine. In addition to mega mining sites, China has thousands of large and medium-sized mines and tens of thousands of small mines.

=== History ===
Beginning in 1902, the Qing dynasty attempted to regulate and limit foreign control of mining rights in its borders.

During the planned economy of the Mao Zedong era, mineral exploration and mining was limited to state-owned enterprises and collectively owned enterprises. Private exploration of mineral resources was largely prohibited.

During the 1980s as part of the reform and opening up under Deng Xiaoping, the central government encouraged private exploration and mineral use under the policy of "speeding up the water flow". In 1986, China passed its first Mineral Resources Law, which confirmed state ownership of mineral resources and authorized exploration of mineral resources by various kinds of public and private entities. Per these policies, SOEs continued to own and operate the largest and richest mines in China although smaller mines in less strategic industries were available to private and collective enterprises. During this period, the mining industry and the regulatory environment remained relatively underdeveloped and profitability in the industry was generally low.

China's mining industry became more marketized in the 1990s, especially after Deng Xiaoping's 1992 Southern Tour. In 1996, the Mineral Resources Law was revised to more clearly define procedures for mineral extraction and the regulatory roles of government bodies. In the late 1990s, reform of China's state-owned enterprises resulted in numerous state-owned enterprises in the minerals industry being acquired by private investors. By the end of the 1990s, China had become the world's second largest producer of solid minerals and was the largest producer of various specific minerals, including iron and coal, among others.

In the early 2000s, huge mineral deposits including coal (such as Dongsheng Coalfield) and rare earth metals were discovered in Inner Mongolia Autonomous Region, leading to major economic growth for the historically underdeveloped region.

In the mid-2000s, the Chinese government sought to consolidate the mining industry, including through state-owned enterprises acquiring smaller private mines. This approach was driven by concern over environmental harm, workplace safety, and inefficient utilization of mineral deposits.China's mining industry grew substantially and the period from the early 2000s to 2012 is often referred to as a "golden decade" in the industry.

From 2010 to 2011, China's central government designated 69 resource-depleted cities and offered a policy package designed to help their economies transition away from a focus on resource extraction. The policy support included financial subsidies, earmarked loans, compensation for environmental damage caused by the mining industry, and support in incubating non-resource industries. These 69 cities then experienced significant GDP growth and income growth among workers.

In 2013, the State Council designated 262 cities across China as "resource-rich cities".

In 2017, mining industry profits again increased, having previously dropped after the early 2000s "golden decade".

As of 2025, foreign investment in China's mining sector is comparatively small.

=== Policy and regulatory environment ===
Mineral exploration and extraction are highly regulated in China. Various regulatory bodies active in the industry include industry and commerce departments, environmental protection, work safety, and land and resources.

All mineral resources in China are owned by the state, regardless of ownership of the land itself. Mining companies must obtain government approval to obtain mining rights (which can last for up to 30 years) and must pay prospecting and mining fees. The state's ownership of mineral resources is specified by the Mineral Resources Law. The Mineral Resources Law is also the legislation which provides that exploration of mineral resources must authorized by the State Council or provincial-level governments, though in practice the State Council or provincial-level governments delegation this authority to local land and resources departments at the county level or higher.

Extracted minerals are taxed at a low rate in comparison to the value of the minerals. Resource tax was first established in 1984 on coal, oil, and natural gas. The 1994 tax reform expanded the resource tax to include also include ferrous metals, nonferrous metals, nonmetallic minerals, and salt. Resource taxes were based on the volume of minerals until 2011, when resource taxes became based on the sales value of minerals. In addition to taxes, mining enterprises must also pay a nontax Mineral Resource Compensation fee based on the sales value of mineral products. Local governments in resource-rich areas may also require mining enterprises to pay local taxes (that are not split with the central government) or local nontax fees.

China's Two Markets, Two Resources (which is related to the Go Out policy) emphasizes leveraging domestic supply sources of resources (including through increased investment in prospecting and mining) and international sources of resources (through various strategies, including foreign acquisition, investment, short-term purchasing, and long-term purchase contracts). Related, the One Third, One Third, One Third policy prescribes that in procuring natural resources, one third of China's supply should come from domestic production, one third from direct procurement contracts, and one third from foreign acquisitions.

Policy support offered to advance the objectives of Going Out enabled the expansion of the mining industry, including through supporting mining investment that could not have otherwise been economically viable.

The National Food and Strategic Reserves Administration of China's mandate is to stockpile strategic resources and to intervene when necessary in markets. For example, in 2005 and 2021, it released copper into the global markets.

As part of its efforts to enhance the circular economy, China is attempting to decrease its reliance on mining for its mineral supply. In 2005, the National Development and Reform Commission issued a circular economy-focused policy document requiring maximization of recycling and reuse of wastewater, exhaust gas, and water residue generated during mining and smelting. Academic Jing Vivian Zhan writes that promoting the circular economy helps China to avoid the resource curse and helps to alleviate overreliance on extractive industries.

Some subnational Chinese governments seek to promote diversification in non-resource industries by requiring or incentivizing mining companies to also invest in other industries. For example, since 2004, some local governments in Shanxi province have required that coal mining companies set aside funds for investing in noncoal business like agriculture and produce processing.

China's Belt and Road Initiative facilitates international cooperation between China and other countries in mining projects.

The National Plan for Mineral Resources (2016-2020) defined for the first time a category of 24 strategic minerals that the central government views as essential for China's national and economic security and for the growth of emerging industries; the strategic minerals list included the major minerals necessary for green technology.

Initially, China's 2019 Foreign Investment Law prohibited foreign investors from investing in the exploration and mining of rare earths, radioactive minerals, and tungsten. In 2022, these categorical restrictions were lifted. Following the lifting of those categorical restrictions, foreign investment is generally permitted in mining subject to the review and approval of the relevant authorities, such as the Ministry of Natural Resources. The government also issued a positive list of industries where foreign investment is encouraged, including mine restoration, new technologies to improve the utilization of mine residue, exploration and mining of minerals in short supply.

The Chinese government requires mining companies to restore the environment around exhausted mines by refilling excavated pits and planting crops or trees. Many mining companies use these recovered mines for ecotourism business.

== Industry segments ==
=== Antimony ===
In 2022, according to the United States Geological Survey, China accounted for 54.5% of total antimony production, followed by Russia with 18.2% and Tajikistan with 15.5%. In 2024, China placed exports restrictions on antimony.

=== Cobalt ===
China and the Democratic Republic of the Congo have significant trade in cobalt, a metal for which China is the world's largest consumer due to its importance in batteries for electric vehicles. As of 2024, the DRC produces more than 70% of the world's cobalt, and most of this production goes to China. Chinese companies account for the majority of cobalt mining in the DRC.

China is a world leader in refining cobalt, with a 68% share in global supply as of 2022.

=== Coal ===
Coal is the most abundant mineral resource in China by a large margin. It exists in almost all Chinese provinces although major coal mining sites are largely located in northern and central China.

As part of China's efforts to achieve its pledges of peak coal consumption by 2030 and carbon neutrality by 2060, a nationwide effort to reduce overcapacity resulted in the closure of many small and dirty coal mines. Major coal-producing regions like Shaanxi, Inner Mongolia, and Shanxi instituted administrative caps on coal output.

=== Copper ===
Copper is one of the most critical industrial minerals given its importance in any electricity-related technology. It is essential in traditional power generating technology, but even more central to for wind power, solar power, and electric vehicle technology.

Early in the People's Republic of China, the country lacked copper reserves of the quantity and quality sufficient for its industrial development goals. The United States embargo of China inhibited trade with major copper exporting countries and China primarily relied heavily on copper recycling until the 1980s.

As of 2010, China had more than 800 copper mines.

China became the world's largest importer of copper in 2008 and has continued to be as of 2023.

=== Gold ===
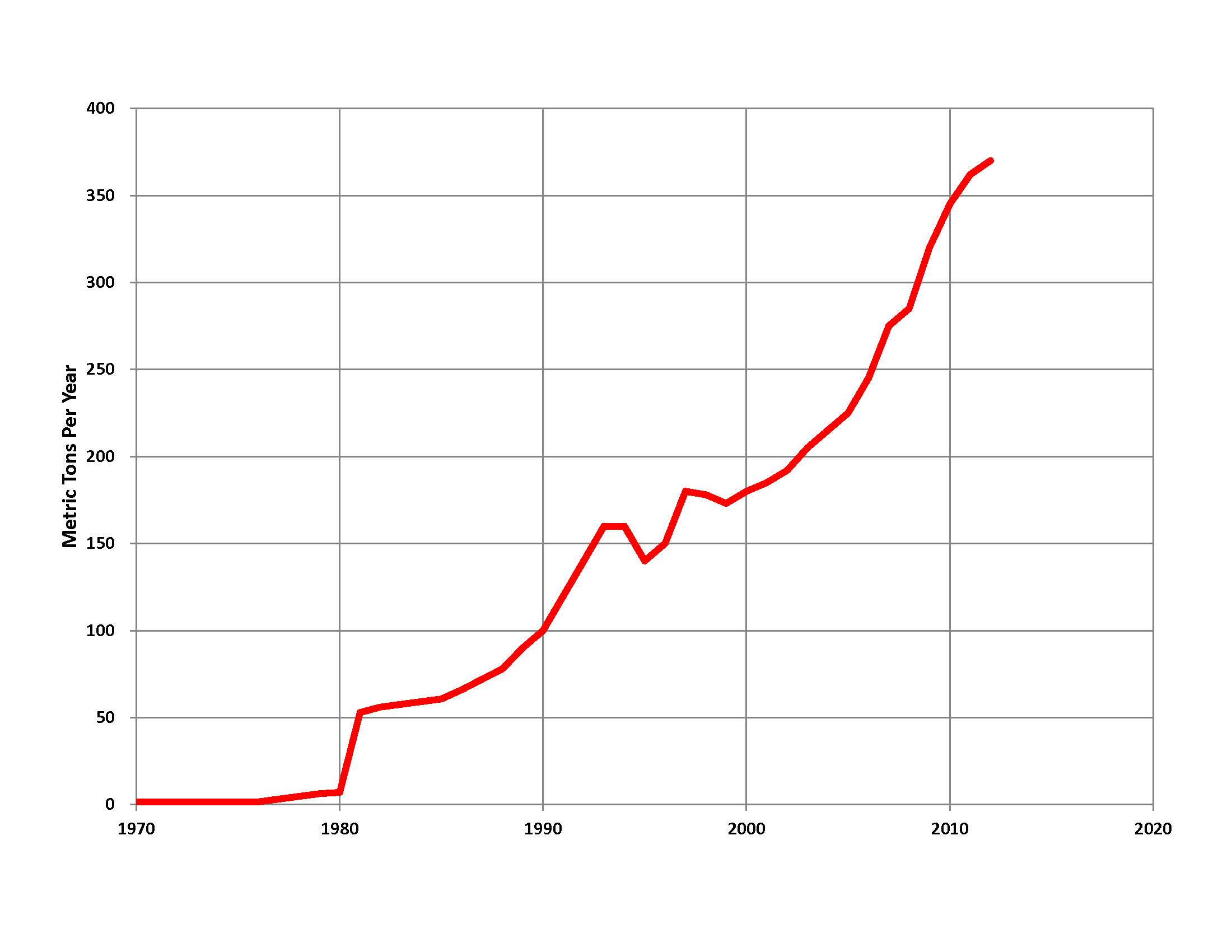
China's mined gold production by year

Gold mining in the People's Republic of China has propelled the country to become the world's largest gold producer since 2007. In 2022, China produced approximately 403 metric tons (403 t) of gold, maintaining its top global position.

=== Iron ===
Beginning in 2003 and continuing through at least 2024, China has been the world's largest importer of iron ore. Its domestic production peaked in 2007 at 402 million tonnes.

China's domestic iron ore sector is highly fragmented among a large number of companies.

The global iron ore market was subject to benchmark pricing negotiating. In 2006, Baosteel became the lead negotiator on the buyer side. In 2009, the Chinese government named China Iron and Steel Association (CISA) the new negotiator. The benchmark pricing system for iron ore ended in 2010 and was replaced with a spot market.

In 2012, CISA along with the China Chamber of Commerce of Metals, Minerals & Chemicals Importers & Exporters and the China Beijing International Mining Exchange created CBMX, an iron ore spot trading platform in China. In 2014, the CBMX platform was transferred to a Chinese and foreign joint venture (the Beijing Iron Ore Trading Center Corporation, or COREX) and ownership was broadened to include trading houses and the four largest Chinese steel mills, in addition to CISA.

In July 2022, China's central government created the state-owned entity China Mineral Resources Group, which is designed to better coordinate China's interactions with the global iron ore industry.

=== Lithium ===
China is a world leader in refining lithium, with a 72% share in global supply as of 2022.

=== Potash ===
Potash is one of the three essential plant nutrients and is a major fertilizer ingredient. It cannot be manufactured and must be mined.

China's domestic potash production comes from isolated mining sites located inland. Most potash deposits in China are concentrated in the deserts and salt flats of the endorheic basins of its western provinces, particularly Qinghai. Geological expeditions discovered the reserves in the 1950s but commercial exploitation lagged until China's Reform and Opening Up. The 1989 opening of the Qinghai Potash Fertilizer Factory in the remote Qarhan Playa increased China's production of potassium chloride sixfold, from less than 40,000 t (39,000 long tons; 44,000 short tons) a year at Haixi and Tanggu to just under 240,000 t (240,000 long tons; 260,000 short tons) a year.

The domestic potash production industry is heavily consolidated, with 21 mining companies operating in China (19 in Qinghai and 2 in Xinjiang Autonomous Region).

Although China had greatly increased its potash production by the 2010s, as of 2024 the country is highly import dependent on potash. The two key importation enterprises are Sinofert (which is a Sinochem subsidiary) and Sino-Agri Group. China is generally concerned about further consolidation in the international potash industry following the 2010 merger of the two largest Russian potash exporters, Uralkali and Silvinit.

The global potash market is subject to benchmark negotiations pricing negotiations. As of 2023, China is the lead benchmark negotiator on the buyer side.

=== Rare earths ===
The People's Republic of China (PRC) is a leading producer and the dominant processor of rare-earth elements (REEs), which are used in technologies ranging from to permanent magnets through to electric vehicles (EVs) and wind turbines to consumer electronics. China is particularly dominant in the midstream separation and refining stages of the rare-earth supply chain and in downstream permanent-magnet manufacturing; the International Energy Agency estimated that China accounted for about 91% of global separation and refining production and 94% of sintered permanent magnet production in 2024.

China has economically extractable deposits of both light and heavy REE ores and has developed industrial-scale solvent extraction for refining them. Over the past decades, it has supplied the majority of global rare-earth demand and holds the world's largest known reserves; the United States Geological Survey reported China's reserves at 44 million tonnes (rare-earth-oxide equivalent) in its February 2026 Mineral Commodity Summaries.

The country also holds a dominant share of global rare-earth-related patents across the value chain; a 2026 patent landscape report based on the EPO's DOCDB simple patent family methodology identified 22,040 global patent families filed between 2014 and 2024 in rare-earth-related technologies, with China accounting for 81% of filings.

Since 2016, China has implemented export controls on certain rare-earth elements and rare-earth processing technology; in 2025, it introduced two waves of export controls covering rare-earth elements and related products and technologies, with the second wave later suspended for one year. In 2026 automatized real-time controls and penalties were introduced in the rare-earth industry.

=== Uranium ===
China's domestic market for uranium is highly concentrated because Chinese policy identifies uranium as a strategic resource and only select companies are authorized to mine it. The country's civilian nuclear industry and its mining are industry are largely concentrated in China General Nuclear Power Group and China National Nuclear Corporation, two state-owned enterprises that report to the State Council.

China's uranium resources are significantly less than its needs. At most, 1% of known recoverable uranium reserves are located in China. Its domestic sources are low quality and therefore expensive to mine.

Per China's Two Markets, Two Resources frame work and its One Third, One Third, One Third policy, China has significantly invested in developing domestic sources of uranium. In 2000, China's uranium output was 700 tonnes. By 2010, China had ten uranium mines producing approximately 1,200 tonnes annually. In 2015, China produced 1,616 tonnes of uranium, which was approximately 3% of global production that year. As of 2020, the country produced 1,885 tonnes annually, which amounted to 19% of its annual requirements.

China's poor uranium resources have resulted in the country developing a strong foreign procurement strategy. China became the world's largest importer of uranium in 2008 and has continued to be as of 2023. Two entities in China account for most of the country's uranium importation.

China's uranium procurement approach includes investment in foreign mining operations. From 2008 until at least 2024, China was one of only four countries to report non-domestic uranium exploration and development expenses. Chinese investment in Kazakhstan mines have contributed to Kazakhstan's current position as the world's largest exporter of uranium. Namibia has been another major destination for Chinese investment in uranium mining and Chinese companies have invested in Namibia's three biggest uranium producers: Husab, Langer Heinrich, and Rössing.

China recently discovered a massive uranium deposit in the Ordos Desert, Inner Mangolia, estimated to contain 30 million tons of uranium. Announced by the China Geological Survey, it is the first ultra-large uranium deposit found in aeolian sandstone formations, marking a significant advancement in the country's mining and energy sectors.

== See also ==
- Mining in Hong Kong
- Mining in Asia
- List of mines in China
- Enterprises:
  - Jiangxi Copper
  - Aluminum Corporation of China Limited
  - China Minmetals
  - China National Coal Group
  - China Nonferrous Metal Mining Group
- Economy of China
- Related industries:
  - Steel industry of China
  - Lithium batteries in China
  - Petroleum industry in China
