= Go out =

Go out may refer to:

- Go out (cards), to empty one's hand or achieve the target number of points in certain card games
- Go out policy, a Chinese overseas investment strategy
- Dating, socialising romantically with another person
- "Go Out", a song by Blur from the album The Magic Whip
