= State-owned Assets Supervision and Administration Commission of the State Council =

Chinese government body

- 国务院国有资产监督管理委员会
- Logo of SASAC

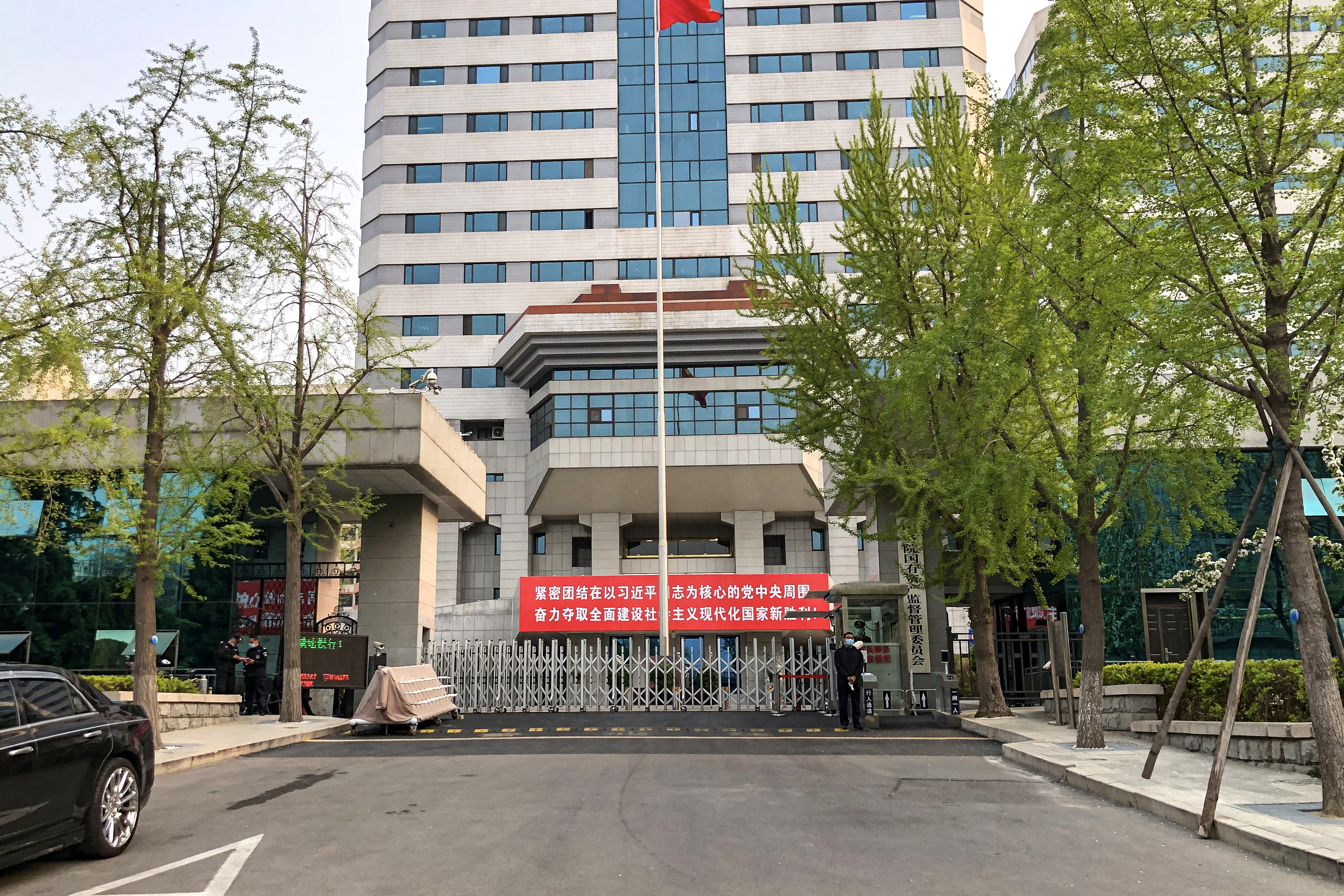
- Gate of SASAC

Agency overview
- Formed: 10 March 2003
- Headquarters: Beijing
- Agency executive: Cheng Fubo, Director, Chinese Communist Party Committee Secretary
- Parent agency: State Council of the People's Republic of China
- Website: www.sasac.gov.cn

State-owned Assets Supervision and Administration Commission of the State Council
- Simplified Chinese: 国务院国有资产监督管理委员会
- Traditional Chinese: 國務院國有資產監督管理委員會
Transcriptions
Standard Mandarin
- Hanyu Pinyin: Guówùyuàn Guóyǒu Zīchǎn Jiāndū Guǎnlǐ Wěiyuánhuì

Abbreviation
- Simplified Chinese: 国资委
- Traditional Chinese: 國資委
- Literal meaning: State Assets Commission
Transcriptions
Standard Mandarin
- Hanyu Pinyin: Guó Zī Wěi

The State-owned Assets Supervision and Administration Commission of the State Council (SASAC) is an institution directly under the State Council of China that acts as the state's owner for centrally administered, non-financial state-owned enterprises (SOEs). It exercises shareholder functions on the State Council's behalf, performance evaluation, approval of major reorganizations and mergers, and rule-making on the management of state assets. Its mandate is grounded in State Council regulations issued in 2003 and in the 2008 law on state-owned assets in enterprises. By law, SASAC defers to the Organization Department of the Chinese Communist Party on appointment and removal of SOE top management.

SASAC's remit covers central, non-financial SOE groups. Financial institutions and a few non-financial SOEs (China Railway, China Tobacco, and CITIC Group) are outside this scope. As of 2025 the commission's English-language directory lists 96 central SOE groups, a figure that changes with mergers and restructurings. Central SOEs are concentrated in backbone sectors such as energy, transport, telecommunications and construction, and operate across the domestic economy and international markets.

In 2024 the total assets of central SOEs exceeded 90 trillion yuan (about US$12 trillion), revenue of 26 trillion yuan (US$3.65 trillion) and total profits were about 2.6 trillion yuan (about US$360 billion).

Recent priorities emphasize value creation and capital-market discipline. In 2024 SASAC said market value management would be included in executive appraisals at listed SOEs, and it clarified that central SOEs are prohibited from establishing, acquiring or taking new stakes in financial institutions. The current chair is Cheng Fubo.

== History ==
=== Origins and creation (2003) ===
SASAC was created in 2003 as part of a State Council restructuring that sought to clarify state ownership of major enterprises and separate government administration from enterprise management. The new body was placed directly under the State Council to exercise the state's contributor and shareholder rights in centrally administered, non-financial state-owned enterprises. Its mandate was framed the same year by the State Council's Interim Regulations on the Supervision and Management of State-Owned Assets of Enterprises, which set out the goals of preserving and increasing state capital value and excluded financial institutions from the remit. In early public briefings the first SASAC leadership described a toolkit that included executive appointments and evaluation, approval of major reorganisations, dispatch of supervisory boards to key firms, and drafting of rules on the management of state assets.

=== Early oversight model (2003 to 2012) ===
In the years after its creation SASAC put in place executive performance contracts and an appraisal system for central SOE leaders. Provisional appraisal procedures were issued in late 2003 and by October 2004 the commission reported that most central SOEs had signed responsibility contracts setting financial and governance targets for annual and term evaluation.

Board reform followed. From 2004 SASAC piloted boards of directors and strengthened the role of outside directors to improve monitoring and decision-making at group level. Seven central government-owned SOEs were chosen for the pilot program, which added boards of directors at the company level, with at least two external board members selected by SASAC. Supervisory boards dispatched on behalf of the State Council reviewed key enterprises and reported on performance and risk alongside SASAC's appraisal work. The legal base was consolidated with the 2008 law on state-owned assets in enterprises, which codified the state owner system and the division of central and local contributor functions. During this period fiscal arrangements for state-capital income were clarified. The state capital operating budget was administered through the Ministry of Finance, while SASAC continued to develop owner-oversight tools around appointments, boards and performance contracts.

=== Reform acceleration (2013 to 2016) ===
The Party’s Third Plenum in 2013 set out plans to develop mixed ownership and to shift from managing enterprises toward managing state capital. In 2015 the Guiding Opinions on Deepening State-owned Enterprise Reform provided the main blueprint and a "1+N" package of supporting documents. Policies classified SOEs into commercial and public-welfare categories with differentiated appraisal, and affirmed Party leadership inside corporate governance. SASAC and the State Council also launched pilots for state-capital investment and state-capital operation companies that would manage portfolios of state equity at arm's length from operating firms. In early 2016 China Chengtong and China Reform Holdings were named as the first central state-capital operation platforms. Restructuring accelerated. Notable mergers included CSR and CNR to form CRRC in 2015, COSCO Shipping in 2016, and the creation of China Baowu through the combination of Baosteel and Wuhan Iron & Steel in 2016.

=== State-capital management shift (2017 to 2020) ===
From 2017 policy moved further toward managing capital. SASAC updated supervision rules for investment by central enterprises and issued dedicated measures for overseas investment that introduced a negative list, main-business requirements and whole-life-cycle oversight. The National Development and Reform Commission revised outbound investment procedures for all firms the same year. Portfolio consolidation continued with the 2017 merger of Shenhua Group and Guodian Group to form China Energy Investment and the 2019 expansion of Baowu through a controlling stake in Magang Group. Governance pilots also widened. The Double Hundred Action selected central and local SOE subsidiaries to trial market-oriented incentives, board practices and mixed-ownership mechanisms. Balance-sheet discipline became a priority. SASAC set multi-year targets to lower the average asset-liability ratio of central SOEs and reported that goals for the 2018 to 2020 period had been met by the end of 2020. In parallel the State Council launched transfers of 10% of state equity in qualified SOEs to the National Social Security Fund to support pensions and diversify state shareholding.

=== Reform deepening and enhancement action (2023–2025) ===
In July 2023, Vice Premier Zhang Guoqing addressed a national teleconference launching a campaign to "deepen and upgrade" SOE reform, which state media described as oriented toward serving national strategies and strengthening SOEs' core functions and competitiveness. Related reporting highlighted priorities including improvements to performance assessment, optimisation of the state-owned economy's structure, capital-focused oversight, and strengthened Party leadership within SOEs.

In June 2025, Xinhua reported that SASAC said at a thematic meeting that, by the end of the first quarter of 2025, the average completion rate of key reform tasks under the campaign had exceeded 80%, and described 2025 as the concluding year for the reform programme.

In December 2025, Xinhua reported that a central enterprise leaders' meeting was told that the campaign's main tasks were "basically completed", and cited examples including continued strategic reorganisations and specialised integration as well as steps to strengthen governance and supervision systems.

== Mandate and legal status ==
SASAC is an institution directly under the State Council that represents the state as investor in centrally administered, non-financial state-owned enterprises. It exercises the contributor's rights on the State Council's behalf, including setting performance targets, evaluating results, proposing or appointing senior executives, approving major reorganizations and drafting rules on the management of state assets. The legal foundation is the State Council's 2003 interim regulations on supervision of enterprise state assets and the 2008 national law on state-owned assets in enterprises.

SASAC's tools are shareholder-style rather than industry licensing. The commission operates an executive appraisal system based on written responsibility contracts and board governance norms, including the use of outside directors at central SOE groups. It also issues and enforces rules for investment and asset management, including measures that supervise domestic investment and overseas investment by central enterprises, and it reviews major transactions and restructurings for alignment with state-capital objectives.

The commission's remit is limited to central, non-financial SOEs. Financial institutions sit outside SASAC's scope under the 2003 regulations. In 2024 SASAC clarified that central SOEs are prohibited from establishing, acquiring or taking new stakes in financial institutions, and encouraged divestment of non-core financial holdings. The Organization Department of the Chinese Communist Party, not SASAC, is empowered with appointing or removing SOE management.

== Significance ==
SASAC oversees China's SOEs in nonfinancial industries deemed strategically important by the State Council, including national champions in areas like energy, infrastructure, strategic minerals, and civil aviation.

The state-owned investment companies of SASAC serve as a mechanism through which the Chinese government can influence the market through the use of capital rather than government directive.

== Central SOEs ==
As of 2023, SASAC currently oversees 97 centrally owned companies. These central SOEs (yangqi) are SOEs that cover industries deemed most vital to the national economy. Companies directly supervised by SASAC are continuously reduced through mergers according to the state-owned enterprise restructuring plan with the number of SASAC companies down from over 150 in 2008.

Central SOEs are further categorized based on their size and strategic importance. "Core" enterprises described as "important backbone SOEs" include enterprises such as China Mobile, State Grid, and Sinopec.

#	English name	Chinese name
1	State Power Investment Corporation	国家电力投资集团公司
2	China Aerospace Science and Technology Corporation	中国航天科技集团公司
3	China Aerospace Science and Industry Corporation	中国航天科工集团公司
4	Aviation Industry Corporation of China	中国航空工业集团公司
5	China State Shipbuilding Corporation	中国船舶工业集团公司
6	China North Industries Group Corporation	中国兵器工业集团公司
7	China South Industries Group Corporation	中国兵器装备集团公司
8	China Electronics Technology Group	中国电子科技集团公司
9	Aero Engine Corporation of China	中国航空发动机集团有限公司
10	China National Petroleum Corporation	中国石油天然气集团公司
11	China Petrochemical Corporation	中国石油化工集团公司
12	China National Offshore Oil Corporation	中国海洋石油集团有限公司
13	State Grid Corporation of China	国家电网公司
14	China Southern Power Grid	中国南方电网有限责任公司
15	China Huaneng Group	中国华能集团公司
16	China Datang Corporation	中国大唐集团公司
17	China Huadian Corporation	中国华电集团公司
18	China Three Gorges Corporation	中国长江三峡集团公司
19	China Energy Investment Corporation	国家能源投资集团有限责任公司
20	China Telecommunications Corporation	中国电信集团公司
21	China United Network Communications Group	中国联合网络通信集团有限公司
22	China Mobile Communications Corporation	中国移动通信集团有限公司
23	China Electronics Corporation	中国电子信息产业集团有限公司
24	FAW Group	中国第一汽车集团有限公司
25	Dongfeng Motor Corporation	东风汽车集团有限公司
26	China First Heavy Industries	中国一重集团有限公司
27	Sinomach	中国机械工业集团有限公司
28	Harbin Electric Corporation	哈尔滨电气集团公司
29	Dongfang Electric Corporation	中国东方电气集团有限公司
30	Ansteel Group	鞍钢集团公司
31	China Baowu Steel Group	中国宝武钢铁集团
32	Aluminum Corporation of China	中国铝业公司
33	China COSCO Shipping	中国远洋海运集团有限公司
34	China National Aviation Holding	中国航空集团公司
35	China Eastern Airlines Group	中国东方航空集团公司
36	China Southern Air Holding	中国南方航空集团公司
37	Sinochem Group	中国中化集团公司
38	COFCO Group	中粮集团有限公司
39	China Minmetals Corporation	中国五矿集团公司
40	China General Technology Group	中国通用技术（集团）控股有限责任公司
41	China State Construction Engineering Corporation	中国建筑工程总公司
42	China Grain Reserves Corporation	中国储备粮管理集团有限公司
43	State Development & Investment Corporation	国家开发投资公司
44	China Merchants Group	招商局集团有限公司
45	China Resources	华润（集团）有限公司
46	China Travel Service (Hong Kong)	中国旅游集团公司[香港中旅（集团）有限公司]
47	Commercial Aircraft Corporation of China	中国商用飞机有限责任公司
48	China Energy Conservation and Environmental Protection Group	中国节能环保集团公司
49	China International Engineering Consulting Corporation	中国国际工程咨询公司
50	China Chengtong Holdings Group	中国诚通控股集团有限公司
51	China National Coal Group	中国中煤能源集团有限公司
52	China Coal Technology and Engineering Group	中国煤炭科工集团有限公司
53	China Academy of Machinery Science and Technology	机械科学研究总院
54	Sinosteel Corporation	中国中钢集团公司
55	China Iron and Steel Research Institute Group	中国钢研科技集团有限公司
56	ChemChina	中国化工集团公司
57	China National Chemical Engineering Group	中国化学工程集团公司
58	China National Salt Industry Corporation	中国盐业总公司
59	China National Building Material Group	中国建材集团有限公司
60	China Nonferrous Metal Mining Group	中国有色矿业集团有限公司
61	General Research Institute for Nonferrous Metals	北京有色金属研究总院
62	General Research Institute of Mining and Metallurgy	北京矿冶研究总院
63	China International Intellectech Corporation	中国国际技术智力合作公司
64	China Academy of Building Research	中国建筑科学研究院
65	CRRC Group	中国中车集团公司
66	China Railway Signal and Communication	中国铁路通信信号集团公司
67	China Railway Engineering Corporation	中国铁路工程总公司
68	China Railway Construction Corporation	中国铁道建筑总公司
69	China Communications Construction	中国交通建设集团有限公司
70	Potevio Group	中国普天信息产业集团公司
71	China Academy of Telecommunications Technology (Datang Telecom Group)	电信科学技术研究院
72	China National Agricultural Development Group	中国农业发展集团有限公司
73	China Silk Corporation	中国中丝集团公司
74	China Forestry Group	中国林业集团公司
75	China National Pharmaceutical Group	中国医药集团总公司
76	China Poly Group Corporation	中国保利集团公司
77	China Construction Technology Consulting Corporation	中国建筑设计研究院
78	China Metallurgical Geology Bureau	中国冶金地质总局
79	China National Administration of Coal Geology	中国煤炭地质总局
80	Xinxing Cathay International Group	新兴际华集团有限公司
81	TravelSky	中国民航信息集团公司
82	China National Aviation Fuel Group	中国航空油料集团公司
83	China Aviation Supplies Holding	中国航空器材集团公司
84	Powerchina	中国电力建设集团有限公司
85	China Energy Engineering Corporation	中国能源建设集团有限公司
86	China National Gold Group Corporation	中国黄金集团公司
87	China General Nuclear Power Group	中国广核集团有限公司
88	China National Nuclear Corporation	中国核工业集团公司
89	China Hualu Group	中国华录集团有限公司
90	Nokia-Sbell	上海诺基亚贝尔股份有限公司
91	FiberHome Technologies Group	武汉邮电科学研究院 (烽火科技集团)
92	Overseas Chinese Town Enterprises	华侨城集团公司
93	Nam Kwong Group	南光（集团）有限公司[中国南光集团有限公司]
94	XD Group	中国西电集团公司
95	China Railway Materials	中国铁路物资（集团）总公司
96	China Reform Holdings Corporation	中国国新控股有限责任公司
97	China Certification & Inspection Group Co., Ltd	中国检验认证集团有限公司
98	China Resources Recycling Group Co., Ltd.	中国资源循环集团有限公司

== Affiliated institutions ==
- Information Center
- Technological Research Center for Supervisory Panels Work
- Training Center
- Economic Research Center
- China Economics Publishing House
- China Business Executives Academy, Dalian

== Industrial associations ==
Affiliated industrial associations include:

- China Federation of Industrial Economics
- China Enterprise Confederation
- China Association for Quality
- China Packaging Technology Association
- China International Cooperation Association for SMEs
- China General Chamber of Commerce
- China Federation of Logistics and Purchasing
- China Coal Industry Association
- China Machinery Industry Federation
- China Iron and Steel Association
- China Petroleum and Chemical Industry Association
- China National Light Industry Associations
- China National Textile Industry Council
- China Building Materials Industry Association
- China Nonferrous Metals Industry Association

== Leadership ==
=== Directors ===
Name	Chinese name	Took office	Left office
Li Rongrong	李荣融	April 2003	August 2010
Wang Yong	王勇	August 2010	March 2013
Jiang Jiemin	蒋洁敏	March 2013	September 2013
Zhang Yi	张毅	December 2013	February 2016
Xiao Yaqing	肖亚庆	February 2016	May 2019
Hao Peng	郝鹏	17 May 2019	3 February 2023
Zhang Yuzhuo	张玉卓	3 February 2023	5 June 2026
Cheng Fubo	程福波	3 July 2026	Incumbent

== See also ==
- China Beijing Equity Exchange
- List of government-owned companies of China
- Rostec
- State-owned Enterprises Commission, the equivalent in Taiwan (ROC)
- Federal Agency for State Property Management
