= CBEX =

CBEX may refer to:

- Cavite–Batangas Expressway
- China Beijing Equity Exchange
