= China Beijing Equity Exchange =

Chinese equity exchange market for Chinese state owned companies

China Beijing Equity Exchange (CBEX; Chinese: 北京产权交易所; pinyin: Běijīng chǎnquán jiāoyìsuǒ) is an equity transaction bourse and platform run by the government of Beijing for mergers, acquisitions and restructuring of state-owned enterprises.

== Background ==
China Beijing Equity Exchange was established in 1994 and now conducts more than 50% of equity transfer, M&A and reconstruction operations in China. CBEX is the sole institution for the transfer of ownership of state-owned enterprises, selected by the Beijing Municipal State-owned Assets Supervision and Administration Commission, and also one of the first trial equity transaction institutions authorized by the State-owned Assets Supervision and Administration Commission of the State Council (SASAC) for the transfer of ownership of state-owned enterprises owned by the Central Government. This implies that the largest and most profitable Chinese State-owned companies must necessarily be privatized through CBEX or one the remaining two Equity Exchanges authorised to this purpose. It is the first choice of distributing center for state equity transfer information in China, and owns plenty of resources on transfer of state-owned equities. The Investment and Financing Promotion Center of Zhongguancun Science & Technology Park, jointly established by CBEX and the Zhongguancun Science & Technology Park Administration is an important platform for investment and financing of high-tech enterprises in the Zhongguancun Science & Technology Park, and has accumulated a large number of investment and financing projects of high-tech enterprises. The Financing Asset Supermarket, jointly established by CBEX together with China Huarong Asset Management, China Orient Asset Management, China Cinda Asset Management and China Great Wall Asset Management, has collected financing assets. Meanwhile, CBEX has established co-operative relationships with equity exchange institutes in 24 provinces, autonomous regions and municipalities through the establishment of agencies, forming a nationwide-wide service network for equity exchanges which can disseminate information on equity exchange projects all over the country.

Quite differently from any other Equity Exchange in China, CBEX has developed a unique cross-border expertise and has carried out a large number of deals with foreign investors. CBEX has entered into co-operation agreements with Nasdaq, the Toronto Stock Exchange, the Zurich Stock Exchange, the Frankfurt Stock Exchange, Reuters and Sunbelt.

On July 18, 2017, CBEX SINOWING International Board, SINOWING (Beijing) Asset Management Co. Ltd and Robert W. Seiden, a Receiver of the U.S. Courts, held a signing and listing ceremony for sale of Chinese companies previously listed on U.S. Stock Exchanges by the Receiver of each company. The projects that were and are being listed on the CBEX SINOWING International Board cover more than 20 industries ranging from energy, medicine and technology, to real estate development, agriculture, and health products.

== Mission ==
- oversee the transfer of State-owned equity to minimize the State's losses through illegitimate valuation and back-office deals;
- provide an open and transparent equity exchange forum;
- link domestic companies with investors worldwide;
- provide information on deals flows and valuation.

CBEX completed 4,151 transactions in 2008 for a combined value in excess of 10 billion Euros.

CBEX is operative in Italy through the equity exchange platform CMEX (China Milan Equity Exchange).

CMEX was founded in 2007 on the basis of an alliance agreement with CBEX on an exclusive basis. The alliance with CBEX makes CMEX the exclusive partner of CBEX in Italy.

== Group sites ==
CBEX operates 13 Group sites or subsidiaries:

- Jinmajia
- CTEX
- CFEX
- CFAE
- CBEEX China Beijing Environmental Exchange
- CBMX China Beijing International Mining Exchange
- BGEX Gold Exchange
- CBRC
- JCEX
- CMEX
- AAEE
- RCUTP Russian Language
- CLEX www.clexlimited.com

== See also ==
- Beijing Stock Exchange
- China's Go Global Strategy
- List of government-owned companies of China
