= Foreign direct investment in China =

Foreign direct investment (FDI) has been an important part of the economy of the People's Republic of China since the 1980s. During the Mao period, most foreign companies halted their operations in China, though China remained connected to the world economy through a limited scale of international trade. Since 1978, China was again open to foreign investment and within two decades it became the largest recipient of foreign direct investment among developing countries. While China's acceptance of foreign investment is commonly associated with Deng Xiaoping’s reform and opening up, Chinese leaders including Mao Zedong and Hua Guofeng already acknowledged the need to import foreign capital and technology in the early 1970s. The investments from the 1970s up till the 2000s mainly focused on the manufacturing sector, earning China the label “world’s factory”.

== Mao period (1949-1976) ==
=== Self-reliance ===
During the Mao period, the Chinese Communist Party adhered to the policy of self-reliance. Foreign direct investment basically did not exist, except for a very small number of foreign-owned companies which continued operation in China, like the Royal Dutch Shell. During the Cultural Revolution, the concept of self-reliance was added with revolutionary values, with Learning from Dazhai in Agriculture and Learning from Daqing in Industry as two notable examples. The adhere to the self-reliance policy, however, does not mean that China was cut off from the world economy. Japan, for instance, was an important trading partner with China since the 1950s. Chinese leaders were eager to emulate the Japanese experiences of state-led development in Manchuria in the 1930s and 1940s.

== Post-Mao period ==
=== Initial state policies ===
After assuming power in 1978, Deng Xiaoping prioritized the policy of attracting foreign investment, giving the term self-reliance a new meaning. China began to attract FDI in 1979. To justify this shift from the self-reliance principle in the Mao period, Deng directed the drafting of a party resolution that interpreted the history of the Chinese Communist Party after coming into power in 1949 and evaluated the role and achievements of Mao Zedong. Its full name is the Resolution on Certain Questions in the History of Our Party since the Founding of the People's Republic of China and it was adopted during the sixth plenary session of the Eleventh Central Committee of the Chinese Communist Party in 1981.

In regard to foreign economic relations, the resolution asserts that by adhering to the principle of self-reliance, the party overcame the wartime blockade from the Nationalist Party and Japanese army. Subsequently, “victory in the Chinese revolution was won because the Chinese Communist Party adhered to the principle of independence and self-reliance and depended on the efforts of the whole Chinese people.” After 1949, the party continued to adhere to the principle to achieve economic development. The resolution states that in 1979, the central leaders adopted new policies to “correct the shortcomings and mistakes of the previous two years in our economic work and eliminate the influence of ‘Left’ errors that had persisted in this field.” To improve the people’s livelihood, the leaders believed that “active efforts must be made to promote economic and technical co-operation with other countries on the basis of independence and self-reliance.”

While the 1981 resolution was widely considered as Deng's signifying the coming of the reform and opening up, political historians Frederick C. Teiwes and Warren Sun argue that Hua Guofeng, generally seen as a loyal follower of Mao Zedong, had already advocated some of the policies that Deng was to implement in the 1980s. The idea that Hua was a transitional figure before Deng steered the reform and opening-up on its full course is untenable because “on all key dimensions - the overambitious drive for growth, a newly expansive policy of openness to the outside world, and limited steps toward management reform - Hua and Deng were in basic agreement.” With respect to self-reliance and foreign economic relations, Hua, for instance, was in charge of approving the setting up special economic zones. Even earlier in 1972, Mao himself approved the imports of goods that allowed further involvement in international trade in late 1970s. Soon after Mao's death, central leaders were generally committed to production-oriented policies and open to importing foreign technology for that purpose. Before Deng assumed power, the reinterpretation of self-reliance and the policy to attract foreign investment and technology were already in place.

Beginning in 1981, the Chinese government provided preferential treatment to foreign direct investment to accelerate the process of opening to foreign capital and technology. That included tax incentives and loosening of administration restrictions. The government initially passed laws like the Equity Joint Venture Income Tax Law, the Foreign Enterprise Income Tax Law and the Industrial and Commercial Tax Provisions, and further in the 1980s, the Regulations for the Implementation of the Law on Chinese-Foreign Equity Joint Ventures, the Law on Enterprises Operated Exclusively with Foreign Capital and the Provisions of the State Council on the Encouragement of Foreign Investment and the Law on Chinese–Foreign Contractual Joint Ventures. The early-to-middle 1980s changes permitted foreign investment through compensatory trade, materials processing, assembly, joint ventures, and complete foreign ownership. In 1991, China implemented further measures to attract FDI.

Initiatives from central leadership were crucial in encouraging local officials and elites to engage with foreign direct investment. In a study on the foreign direct investment in Suzhou, political scientist David Zweig challenges the neoliberal model that suggests “foreign trade, with its diverse impact on industrial sectors, generates collective action among domestic coalitions who lobby for policy outcomes supporting their collective interests.” Zweig, however, does not find the elite in rural coastal China lobbying for more trade in a time when their own comparative advantage in foreign trade increased. What he found instead was the effects of state initiatives from central level in the penetration of foreign direct investment into rural China. He identifies two reasons for the phenomenon: 1) the farmers and managers of township and village enterprises either had to pay too high a cost to lobby for their interests or had no formal channel to influence policy-making; and 2) they lack the incentives to engage in foreign trade because of state monopoly over external interactions and the use of foreign exchange. Only after the state loosened the control over the use of the foreign currency earned through export did the rural elite make use of the low labor cost in the countryside, increase the amount of export, and import technology to improve the quality of production.

=== Development ===
Foreign Direct Investment in China, 1979-94 (millions of US$)
Year	Contracted	Actual
1979-82 (cumulative)	6,999	1,767
1983	1,917	916
1984	2,875	1,419
1985	6,333	1,959
1986	3,330	2,244
1987	4,319	2,647
1988	6,191	3,739
1989	6,294	3,773
1990	6,987	3,755
1991	12,422	4,666
1992	58,736	11,292
1993	111,435	27,514
1994	81,406	33,787

As seen from the above table, the initial increase in foreign direct investment was slow after Chinese government passed several laws in the late 1970s and early 1980s. Political scientist David Zweig argues that significant increases did not come until the changes in national policies in 1984 when the central leaders mobilized state organs to incentivize economic opening-up. There was a steady rise in foreign direct investment in China in the second half of the 1980s until the 1989 Tiananmen Square protests and massacre, which briefly disrupted the growing trend. The amount increased again soon after 1990, and especially after Deng Xiaoping's Southern Tour in 1992. For the trend in the 1990s, economist Nicholas R. Lardy summarizes four reasons for the continuous growth in foreign direct investment: 1) globally, the increase in the magnitude of foreign direct investment flowing to developing countries; 2) the political stability after the 1989 Tiananmen Square protests and massacre and China's domestic economic growth; 3) China's more liberalized policy in attracting foreign investment; and 4) what he calls “the phenomena of recycled capital of Chinese origin,” meaning that to exploit the advantages of the preferential foreign direct investment treatments, Chinese companies relocated their capital to outside of China and reinvested back to China. This form of foreign direct investment accounted for around one fourth of the investment flows in 1992. Economist Barry Naughton identifies two other reasons for the surge after 1992: 1) the institutional foundations and preferential foreign direct investment policies that the party had been building and providing in the previous decade; and 2) a further opening of the sectors that foreign companies could participate, from mainly export manufacturing before 1992, to domestic marketplace like real estate afterwards.

In 2002, China became the world's top recipient of FDI.

In 2008, China eliminated corporate income tax rates that had been preferential for foreign-invested enterprises.

=== Special economic zones ===
Chinese leaders set up special economic zones to attract foreign investment since 1980, with the first four in Shenzhen, Zhuhai, and Shantou in Guangdong province and Xiamen in Fujian province. SEZs quickly became a favored location for foreign investors to establish joint ventures with Chinese partners. The second wave came in 1984 when Chinese government set up 14 more special economic zones in coastal area. Four years later, Chinese government designated Hainan island as a separate province and another special economic zone. In 1992, Chinese leaders furthered the process by setting up special economic zones in Pudong area in Shanghai and two dozen more in inner cities. Pudong New Area was granted even greater policy latitude in attracting FDI than earlier established SEZs.

SEZs offered favorable tax policies as part of the effort to attract FDI.

Economist Barry Naughton argues that the preference for setting up special economic zones “is consistent with the dualistic system that was such a prominent feature of the trading regime” and “permitted incremental progress within a rigid system.” Special economic zones in this sense were a laboratory for Chinese leaders to test the economic policies. If successful, they could either set up more such zone or implement those policies in other parts of China; and if not, they could also contain the failure within the zone and keep control over the Chinese economy. While the conservative fiction within the party drew comparison between special economic zones and foreign concessions in late Qing and Republic period, reformers considered the zones a sign of commitment to economic change. Deng Xiaoping's Southern Tour signaled the continuation of reform in 1992. Naughton also reminds that special economic zones resembled export-processing zones in other Asian countries, but with greater liberalization. While the economic development and urban landscape in the special economic zones symbolize the achievements of China's economic policies since the late 1970s, the negative effects that the reform brought to Chinese society could also be found in the special economic zones.

=== Sources ===
From 1992 until at least 2023, China has been either the number one or number two worldwide destination for foreign direct investment.

Top 15 investors in China to the end of 2014
	US$ billion	%
Hong Kong	746.9	46.5
British Virgin Islands	141.8	8.8
Japan	98.3	6.1
United States	75.4	4.7
Singapore	72.3	4.5
Taiwan	61.2	3.8
South Korea	59.9	3.7
Cayman Islands	28.7	1.8
Germany	23.9	1.5
Samoa	23.4	1.5
United Kingdom	19.2	1.2
Netherlands	14.7	0.9
France	13.6	0.9
Mauritius	13.0	0.8
Macau	11.9	0.7
Others	200.8	12.5
Total	1605.3	100

The largest source of foreign direct investment in China is what economist Barry Naughton calls “the China circle”, Hong Kong, Taiwan, and Macau. Among the three locations, Hong Kong has remained the largest source since the mid-1980s. Investment from developed countries like Japan and the United States constituted the second group for the period concerned. Naughton notes that as investment from Korea and Japan focused on northeastern part of China, it may have had a stimulating effect on the otherwise declining economy in the region. In the 1960s and 1970s, Hong Kong and Taiwan had gone through a period of sustained growth based on manufacturing. As the local production costs began to rise in the 1980s, manufactures started to relocate their production to the recently available special economic zones in China. Naughton highlights the low transaction costs within the China circle as the key factor that facilitated the relocation of production to China and hence the inflow of capital. As the Hong Kong and Taiwan owners brought capital, management methods, and technology to industrialize southern China, their factories also absorbed the labor force from rural countryside, leading the labor force in Guangdong and Fujian to nearly double from 1985 to 2001.

China is the largest destination of Taiwan's foreign investment, with 54.3% of Taiwan's foreign investment going into China over the period 1991 to 2020.

Hong Kong's role also helped American business interests to enter the Chinese soil. Historian Peter E. Hamilton argues that the role of Hong Kong was more than facilitating investment since 1978, but even before that, the local and American business interests in Hong Kong already attempted to engage with China economically through trade ventures and the distribution of international publications. Their efforts paved the way for further challenging investment into China and convincing Chinese officials to adopt export-oriented policies in the 1980s.

=== Consequences ===
==== Rural industrialization ====
Foreign investment during the 1990s increased the pace of rural industrialization. It contributed to the establishment of industries in rural China which absorbed a significant amount of rural workers who left lower wage agricultural work. This also spurred the development of rural infrastructure.

==== Income Inequality ====
While inequality had been a feature of the Mao period despite the Communist egalitarian rhetoric, the coming of foreign capital exacerbated and altered the form of inequality in the immediate post-Mao period. Ching-kwan Lee and Mark Selden argue that “persistent inequality, defined broadly in terms of income, wealth, life chances and basic needs entitlements, has resulted from three durable hierarchies—class, citizenship and location.” Such hierarchy-driven inequalities remained prominent from the 1980s onwards. For instance, Lee and Selden highlight the trend of rural industrialization, driven by foreign capital, in providing the economic benefits to coastal areas and giving rise to an “emerging bureaucratic-business elite wedding regulatory power with capital, including Chinese private capital and international capital.” During the privatization of state-owned enterprises in the 1990s, this elite directly benefited from the inflow of foreign capital, thanks to their privileged positions, while workers who once received limited protection from the state were now rendered redundant. As such, the inequity in the post-Mao period was not new, but a manifestation of an already existing inequality. As the economy continued to grow, the widening inequality reached a critical point and began to fall. It did so by providing employment opportunities to rural unskilled labor, knowledge spillovers, and development of the local economy.

==== Labor rights ====
As noted above, in attracting foreign investment the central and local governments often offered preferential treatments to foreign companies including the loosening of regulations. One consequence of this rush for foreign investment is the abuse of labor protections in the special economic zones in China. From the 1990s onwards there were notable fatal accidents in foreign-owned factories that were the result of poor working conditions and long working hours. Despite some government response, cases of foreign-owned factories exploiting loopholes in labor regulations remained common.

The most devastating incident was the Zhili Handicraft Factory fire in 1993 that killed 87 workers and injured 47, out of some 400 workers. Since the 1980s, a large number of migrants from rural China has come to south China in search for factory jobs, often through the introduction of their relatives. Most Hong Kong- or Taiwan-owned factories sub-contracted to make shoes, clothes, electronic appliances, or toys for American, European, or Japanese companies, and provided work opportunities to those migrants, mostly young women. The Zhili Handicraft Factory was one such factory that produced toys for an Italian company. At Zhili, the management practiced the illegal “three-in-one” arrangement with the production floor, storage space and workers’ dormitory all in one place. To prevent pilfering of goods from the workers, the managers also locked the windows in the factory and dormitory. When a fire broke out on November 19, 1993, the workers were locked within the factory compound and killed inside. Other similar accidents happened in the coastal areas where foreign-owned factories were common, though the casualties were less severe. Trade unions independent of government control remained impossible. For the case of Zhili, the representatives of the Italian toy company initially agreed to compensate the victims, but eventually claimed that they had invested the money in school and the production of artificial limbs.

== Outbound FDI ==
Hong Kong is a major transition point for outbound FDI originating from elsewhere in China.

China is one of the main sources of FDI for the countries of southeast Asia. Singapore, in particular, is a major destination for outbound Chinese FDI in the region. Chinese foreign direct investment in southeast Asia is primarily in sectors like mining, energy, industrial parks, and infrastructure. As of 2024, Chinese investment in agriculture in southeast Asia is comparatively small but growing.

China's state-owned enterprises have historically provided most of its outbound FDI. Outbound FDI from SOEs have benefitted from policy support including export buyers' credits and concessional loans from policy banks.

The National Development and Reform Commission monitors the outbound foreign direct investment of Chinese businesses. The NDRC must approve sensitive projects, including projects in countries that do not recognize the People's Republic of China, projects in countries experiencing civil war or other major domestic difficulties, or projects involving sensitive subject matter like cross-border water issues or weapons production.

The Go Out policy prompted major increases in China's outbound FDI.

In 2022, outbound FDI from China in renewable energy reached USD 2.7 billion.

As of 2026, the Chinese companies are increasingly providing outbound foreign investment for both greenfield investments and mergers and acquisitions.

== See also ==
- World Trade Organization
- China and the World Trade Organization
- List of countries by FDI abroad
