= Shi Qirong =

Shi Qirong (March 1929 - June 23, 2024, Chinese: 石启荣), a native of Qu County, Sichuan Province, was a political figure and industrial manager in the People's Republic of China.

== Biography ==
In August 1948, Shi Qirong was admitted to the Mining and Metallurgy Department of Chongqing University, and later enrolled in the Iron and Steel Program of the Metallurgy Department.

From August 1952 to October 1973, Shi Qirong served as a technician at the Anshan Iron and Steel Design Institute (Chinese: 鞍山钢铁设计院), a team leader and engineer in the Iron and Steel Division of the Heavy Industry Bureau of the State Construction Committee, and a deputy chief and engineer in the Iron and Steel Division of the Heavy Industry Bureau of the State Planning Commission. He joined the Chinese Communist Party (CCP) in July 1953. He was then dispatched to Beijing during the Cultural Revolution in October 1973. Subsequently, he served as deputy director and deputy director of the Handan Iron and Steel Factory in Hebei Province, deputy director of the Heavy Industry Bureau of the State Construction Committee, member of the State Economic Commission, and member of the State Planning Commission.

He held the positions of vice president and secretary of the CCP committee of CIECC, as well as general manager and CCP committee secretary of China International Engineering Consulting Corporation (CIECC, Chinese: 中国国际工程咨询公司) from December 1985 to October 1995. Between December 1985 and October 1995, he served as the General Manager and CCP committee secretary of CIECC, a member of the State Planning Commission, and the General Manager and Secretary of the CCP committee of CIECC. Shi Qirong significantly contributed to the development of Baoshan Iron and Steel Phases II and III. Following the conclusion of Baosteel's Phases II, the Phases III was scheduled; however, the projected investment of $60 billion RMB exceeded the combined costs of the first two phases, consuming nearly all the funding allocated by the Ministry of Metallurgy of China at that time, placing significant pressure on CIECC. Shi Qirong asserted that Baoshan Iron and Steel serves as the cornerstone of Chinese steel and should aspire to be the foremost globally. In 1992, Shi guided the company to secure approval from the State Planning Commission, which ceased to impose restrictions on the investment scale and production capacity previously mandated by the Ministry of Metallurgy. In 1993, Shi presented the feasibility study report for Baosteel Phase III to the State Council, articulating the project's significance, which ultimately received approval.

Shi Qirong also served as a member of the 8th and 9th Chinese People's Political Consultative Conference. He held the positions of vice president and honorary president of the China Investment Association.

He died in Beijing on June 23, 2024, at the age of 95 years.
