= Wang An (executive) =

Chinese engineer and business executive

- 王安

Chairman of China International Engineering Consulting Corporation
- In office March 2018 – October 2021
- Preceded by: New title
- Succeeded by: Gou Husheng

General Manager of China International Engineering Consulting Corporation
- In office October 2015 – July 2020
- Preceded by: Xiao Fengtong
- Succeeded by: Gou Husheng

General Manager of China National Coal Group
- In office September 2008 – September 2015
- Preceded by: Jing Tianliang
- Succeeded by: Peng Yi

Personal details
- Born: 9 August 1958 (age 68) Liangcheng County, Inner Mongolia, China
- Party: Chinese Communist Party
- Education: Taiyuan University of Technology; Liaoning Technical University
- Scientific career
- Fields: Mining engineering
- Workplaces: China International Engineering Consulting Corporation

Wang An (Chinese: 王安; pinyin: Wáng Ān; born 9 August 1958) is a Chinese engineer and business executive who was general manager and chairman of China International Engineering Consulting Corporation, and general manager of China National Coal Group. He was an academician of the Chinese Academy of Engineering.

== Biography ==
Wang was born in Liangcheng County, Inner Mongolia, on 9 August 1958. He graduated from Shanxi Mining Institute (now Taiyuan University of Technology) in 1982, and earned a master's degree from Liaoning Technical University in 2002.

He entered the workforce in August 1982, and joined the Chinese Communist Party (CCP) in June 1988. Beginning in 1982, he served in several posts in Wuda District Mining Bureau, including administrator, deputy team leader, team leader, engineer, and chief engineer. He was dispatched to Shenhua Group in August 1998. He moved up the ranks to become deputy general manager in July 2008. In September 2008, he became general manager of China National Coal Group, the second largest state-owned coal mining enterprise in China, rising to chairman in August 2014. In September 2015, he appointed he general manager of China International Engineering Consulting Corporation. After this office was terminated in July 2020, he rose to become chairman, serving until October 2021.

=== Downfall ===
On 29 October 2021, he has been placed under investigation for "serious violations of discipline and laws" by the Central Commission for Discipline Inspection (CCDI), the CCP's internal disciplinary body, and the National Supervisory Commission, the highest anti-corruption agency of China. Before he stepped down, three academicians of the Chinese Academy of Engineering had been sacked for graft, namely Li Ning, Zhou Guotai and Meng Wei.

== Honours and awards ==
- 2009 Member of the Chinese Academy of Engineering (CAE)

Business positions
Preceded by Jing Tianliang	General Manager of China National Coal Group; 2008–2015	Succeeded by Peng Yi (彭毅)
Preceded by Xiao Fengtong (肖凤桐)	General Manager of China International Engineering Consulting Corporation; 2015–2020	Succeeded by Gou Husheng (苟护生)
New title	Chairman of China International Engineering Consulting Corporation; 2018–2021	Succeeded by Gou Husheng (苟护生)
