= China International Engineering Consulting Corporation =

State-owned company based in Beijing, China

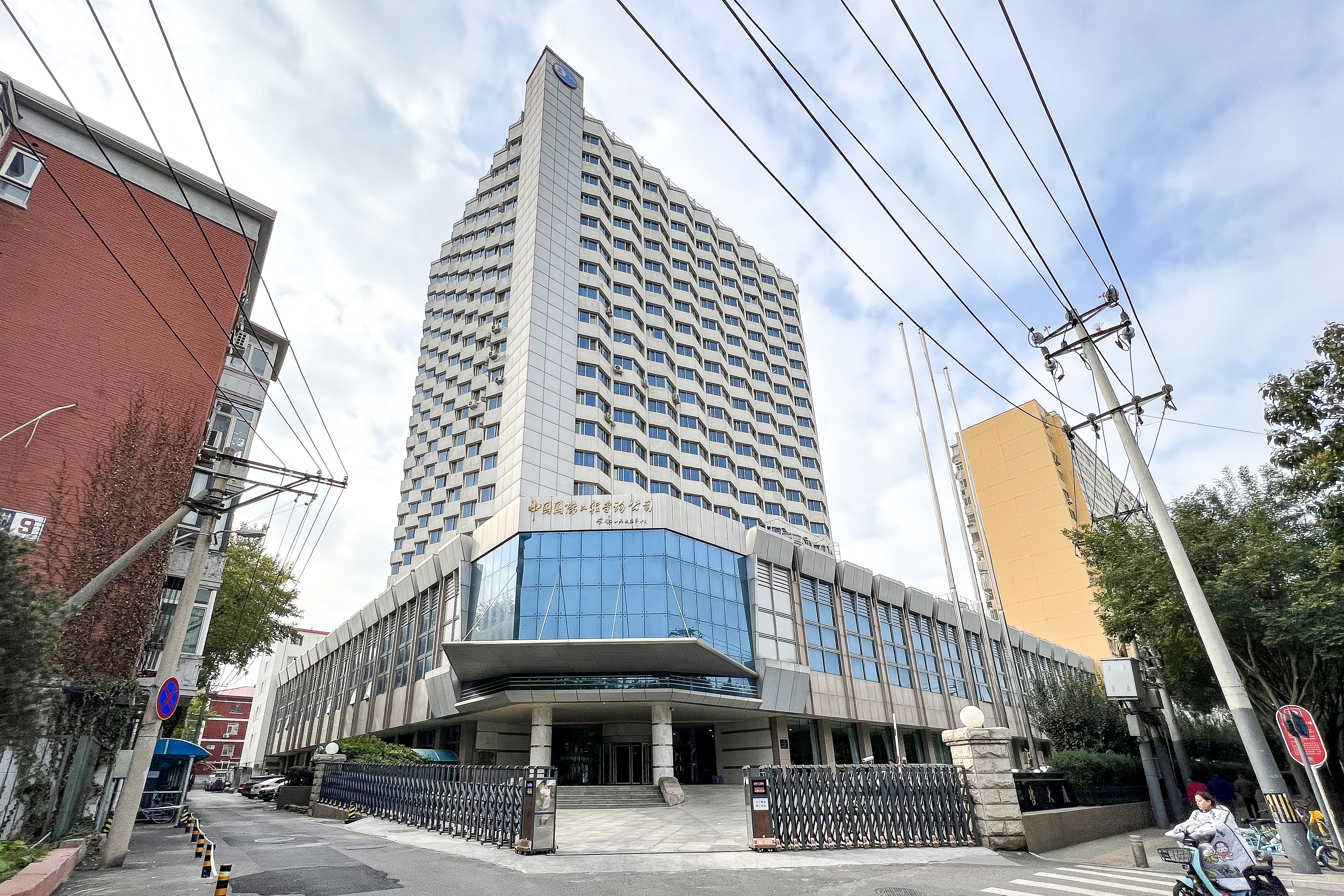
- Company headquarters, name inscribed by Premier Li Peng in 1995
- Company type: Government-owned companies
- Industry: Consulting engineering industry
- Founded: August 23, 1982
- Headquarters: No. 32, Chegongzhuang West Road, Haidian District, China Beijing
- Key people: Chairman: Gou Guosheng
- Website: China International Engineering Consulting Corporation

China International Engineering Consulting Corporation (CIECC, Chinese: 中国国际工程咨询公司, 中咨公司) is a company run under the State-owned Assets Supervision and Administration Commission of the State Council. CIECC engages in engineering consulting, engineering design, engineering supervision, engineering bidding and engineering costing.

== History ==
China International Engineering Consulting Corporation (CIECC) was created in August 1982 and was subsequently designated as a unit directly under the State Construction Committee, the State Economic Committee, and the State Planning Commission. In July 1998, CIECC was separated from the State Planning Commission. In March 2003, with the formation of the State-owned Assets Supervision and Administration Commission (SASAC) by the State Council, CIECC was placed under the control of SASAC. On December 29, 2017, CIECC rebranded itself as China International Engineering Consulting Co.

CIECC had executed a total of significant consulting services across several categories. The projects encompass the West–East Gas Pipeline, West-to-East Electricity Pipeline, South-to-North Water Diversion, Returning Farmland to Forestry, Geological Hazard Prevention and Control in the Three Gorges Reservoir Area, Beijing-Shanghai High-Speed Railway, Shougang Group's Relocation, the Olympic Stadium, Qinghai-Tibet Railway, National Museum, the Hong Kong-Zhuhai-Macao Bridge, the Comac C919, the Chinese Lunar Exploration Program, and the New Generation of Carrier Vehicles among others.

== Leader ==
General Manager

- Shi Qirong (December 1985 - October 1995)
- Xiao Fengtong (2009–2015)
- Wang An (2015–2020)
- Gou Husheng (2020–now)
