= Liu Shiquan =

- 刘石泉

Chairman of the China North Industries Group Corporation Limited
- In office 20 May 2022 – April 2024
- Preceded by: Jiao Kaihe
- Succeeded by: Cheng Fubo

Personal details
- Born: January 1963 (age 63) Daye County, Hubei, China
- Party: Chinese Communist Party
- Education: Harbin Engineering University; Huazhong University of Science and Technology

Chinese name
- Simplified Chinese: 刘石泉
- Traditional Chinese: 劉石泉
Transcriptions
Standard Mandarin
- Hanyu Pinyin: Liú Shíquán

Liu Shiquan (Chinese: 刘石泉; born January 1963) is a Chinese missile technology expert and business executive who served as Chairman of the China North Industries Group Corporation Limited from 2022 to 2024. Previously he served as general manager of China Aerospace Science and Industry Corporation.

He was an alternate of the 16th, 17th, 18th, and 19th Central Committee of the Chinese Communist Party.

== Biography ==
Liu was born in Daye County (now Daye), Hubei, in January 1963. After resuming the college entrance examination, in 1978, he was admitted to Harbin Institute of Marine Engineering (now Harbin Engineering University), majoring in missile general design. After university in 1982, he was assigned as a technician to the Base Design Institute of the Ministry of Space. In 1984, he became a graduate student in Central China University of Science and Engineering (now Huazhong University of Science and Technology). After graduating in 1987, he was recalled to the original department as an engineer.

He was appointed deputy commander in chief of China Aerospace Science and Industry Corporation, in May 2001, becoming dean of the Fourth Research Institute in December 2011 and general manager in February 2019. On 20 May 2022, he was made chairman of the China North Industries Group Corporation Limited.

Business positions
Preceded by Jiao Kaihe	Chairman of the China North Industries Group Corporation Limited; 2022–2024	Succeeded by Cheng Fubo
