= China Beijing International Mining Exchange =

China Beijing International Mining Exchange (CBMX; Chinese: 北京国际产业权交易所; pinyin: Běijīng guójì kuàngyè quán jiāoyì suǒ) is an electronic transaction bourse and platform for mineral rights transactions in China. It handles transactions for both State-owned enterprises SOEs as well as transfers of enterprise-owned mineral rights.

== Background ==
In 2012, China Iron and Steel Association along with the China Chamber of Commerce of Metals, Minerals & Chemicals Importers & Exporters and the China Beijing International Mining Exchange created CBMX, an iron ore spot trading platform in China. In 2014, the CBMX platform was transferred to a Chinese and foreign joint venture (the Beijing Iron Ore Trading Center Corporation, or COREX) and ownership was broadened to include trading houses and the four largest Chinese steel mills, in addition to CISA.

The CBMX is physically located in the Fortune Times Building, 3rd floor, in Xicheng District, Beijing in Financial Street. The CBMX has a trading room with computer terminals for 'members' in the middle and 'traders' on either side, and a large red LED display board at the front of the room.

Information on the system is mainly in Chinese and only a small amount of English content is provided. CBMX provides flowcharts showing the transaction processes for both transfer of State-owned mineral rights and transfer of mineral rights owned by enterprises.

The CBMX trading volume reached 30 million tonnes in 2015 and 100 million tonnes in 2016.

== See also ==
- China's Go Global Strategy
- Mining industry of China
