= Zhang Yuzhuo =

Chinese business executive and politician

- 张玉卓
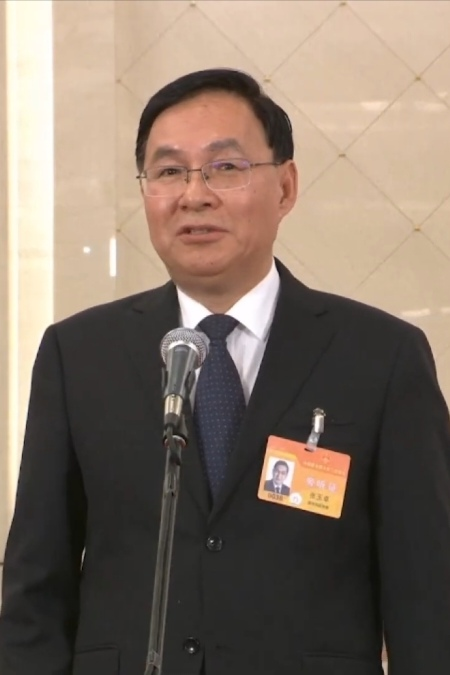
- Zhang in 2024

President of the Chinese Academy of Engineering
- Incumbent
- Assumed office July 2026
- Preceded by: Li Xiaohong

Chairman of the State-owned Assets Supervision and Administration Commission of the State Council
- In office 3 February 2023 – 5 June 2026
- Premier: Li Qiang
- Preceded by: Hao Peng
- Succeeded by: Cheng Fubo

Party Branch Secretary of the China Association for Science and Technology
- In office August 2021 – January 2023
- Preceded by: Huai Jinpeng
- Succeeded by: He Junke

Chairman of China Petrochemical Corporation
- In office January 2020 – July 2021
- Preceded by: Dai Houliang
- Succeeded by: Ma Yongsheng

Communist Party Secretary of Binhai New Area
- In office March 2017 – January 2020
- Preceded by: Zong Guoying
- Succeeded by: Lian Maojun

Chairman of Shenhua Group
- In office May 2014 – March 2017
- Preceded by: Zhang Xiwu
- Succeeded by: Position revoked

Personal details
- Born: 5 January 1962 (age 64) Shouguang County, Shandong, China
- Party: Chinese Communist Party
- Education: Shandong University of Science and Technology; General Academy of Coal Sciences; University of Science and Technology Beijing; University of Southampton; Tsinghua University

Chinese name
- Simplified Chinese: 张玉卓
- Traditional Chinese: 張玉卓
Transcriptions
Standard Mandarin
- Hanyu Pinyin: Zhāng Yùzhuó

Zhang Yuzhuo (Chinese: 张玉卓; pinyin: Zhāng Yùzhuó; born 5 January 1962) is a Chinese business executive and politician, and the current president of the Chinese Academy of Engineering since July 2026. He was the chairman of the State-owned Assets Supervision and Administration Commission of the State Council from 2023 to 2026, the party branch secretary of the China Association for Science and Technology from 2021 to 2023. He was an alternate of the 19th Central Committee of the Chinese Communist Party and is a member of the 20th Central Committee of the Chinese Communist Party.

== Biography ==
Zhang was born in Shouguang County, Shandong, on 5 January 1962. After resuming the college entrance examination, in 1978, he was admitted to Shandong University of Science and Technology, where he majored in coal mine survey. After completing his master's degree at General Academy of Coal Sciences, he attended the University of Science and Technology Beijing where he obtained his doctor's degree in 1989. He carried out postdoctoral research at the University of Southampton in September 1992. He was a visiting research fellow at Southern Illinois University in October 1993.

Zhang began his career as an assistant engineer at the Beijing Mining Research Institute, General Academy of Coal Sciences in July 1985, becoming deputy director in 1994, vice president in 1997 and president in 1999. In January 2002, he became deputy general manager of China's largest coal miner Shenhua Group, and was appointed general manager in December 2008. After this office was terminated in May 2011, he rose to become its chairman, serving until March 2017.

He entered politics in March 2017, when he was transferred to Tianjin, where he was a member of the Standing Committee of the Tianjin Municipal Committee of the Chinese Communist Party and CCP Committee Secretary of Binhai New Area.

On 17 January 2020, he was appointed chairman of China Petrochemical Corporation, but having held the position for only one and a half years. In August 2021, he was appointed party branch secretary of the China Association for Science and Technology.

On 27 December 2022, he was appointed party secretary of the State-owned Assets Supervision and Administration Commission (SASAC), succeeding Hao Peng. On 3 February 2023, he was appointed as the chairman of SASAC.

In May 2026, he was appointed as the party secretary of the Chinese Academy of Engineering. His chairman of SASAC post was removed on 5 June. On 11 July, he was elected as the president of the CAE.

== Honors and awards ==
- December 2011 Member of the Chinese Academy of Engineering (CAE)

Government offices
Preceded by Zhang Xiwu	Chairman of Shenhua Group; 2014–2017	Succeeded by Position revoked
Preceded by Dai Houliang	Chairman of China Petrochemical Corporation; 2020–2021	Succeeded by Ma Yongsheng
Preceded by Hao Peng	Chairman of the State-owned Assets Supervision and Administration Commission of the State Council; 2022–2026	Succeeded by Cheng Fubo
Party political offices
Preceded by Zong Guoying	Communist Party Secretary of Binhai New Area; 2017–2020	Succeeded by Lian Maojun
Preceded by Huai Jinpeng	Party Branch Secretary of the China Association for Science and Technology; 2021–2023	Succeeded by He Junke
Academic offices
Preceded by Li Xiaohong	President of the Chinese Academy of Engineering; 2026–	Incumbent
