= Cheng Fubo =

Chinese politician

- 程福波

Director of the State-owned Assets Supervision and Administration Commission of the State Council
- Incumbent
- Assumed office 3 July 2026
- Preceded by: Zhang Yuzhuo

Communist Party Secretary of the State-owned Assets Supervision and Administration Commission of the State Council
- Incumbent
- Assumed office 30 June 2026
- General Secretary: Xi Jinping
- Preceded by: Zhang Yuzhuo

Chairman of the Aviation Industry Corporation of China
- In office July 2025 – June 2026
- Preceded by: Zhou Xinmin
- Succeeded by: Vacant

Chairman of the China North Industries Group Corporation Limited
- In office 30 April 2024 – July 2025
- Preceded by: Liu Shiquan
- Succeeded by: Zhou Zhiping

Personal details
- Born: September 1970 (age 56) Bishan District, Chongqing, China
- Party: Chinese Communist Party
- Education: Nanjing University of Aeronautics and Astronautics

Cheng Fubo (Chinese: 程福波; pinyin: Chéng Fūbō; born September 1970) is a Chinese executive and politician, currently serving as Communist party secretary and chairman of the State-owned Assets Supervision and Administration Commission of the State Council (SASAC). He is a representative of the 20th National Congress of the Chinese Communist Party.

== Early life and education ==
Cheng was born in Bishan District, Chongqing, in September 1970. In 1988, he enrolled at Nanjing Aeronautical Institute (now Nanjing University of Aeronautics and Astronautics), where he majored in industrial management engineering. He joined the Chinese Communist Party (CCP) in January 1992 in his senior year.

== Career ==
After graduating in 1992, Cheng was assigned to Chengdu Aircraft Industry Company, where he served in several posts, including intern, dispatcher, deputy sector chief, leader of the Preparation Group for the No. 16 Workshop, party secretary and deputy manager of the Civil Aircraft Manufacturing Company, production commander and deputy chief engineer, chairman of the trade union, deputy party secretary and deputy general manager, vice chairman, and finally chairman and party secretary.

In January 2018, Cheng was transferred to Shanghai and appointed deputy general manager of the Commercial Aircraft Corporation of China, Ltd.

Cheng entered politics in June 2020, when he was named vice governor of Shaanxi. In December 2021, he was admitted as a member of the CCP Shaanxi Provincial Committee, the province's top authority. In January 2022, he became head of the Organization Department of the CCP Shaanxi Provincial Committee, but held the position for only eleven months.

In December 2022, Cheng was assigned to a similar position in the coastal province Guangdong.

On 30 April 2024, Cheng was made chairman of the China North Industries Group Corporation Limited.

In July 2025, Cheng was appointed chairman of the Aviation Industry Corporation of China.

On 30 June 2026, Cheng was appointed Communist party secretary of the State-owned Assets Supervision and Administration Commission of the State Council. Later, he was appointed as the chairman on 3 July 2026.

Business positions
| Preceded by Liu Shiquan | Chairman of the China North Industries Group Corporation Limited; 2024–2025 | Succeeded by Zhou Zhiping |
| Preceded by Zhou Xinmin | Chairman of the Aviation Industry Corporation of China; 2025–2026 | Vacant |
Party political offices
| Preceded by Zhang Guangzhi | Head of the Organization Department of Shaanxi Provincial Committee of the Chinese Communist Party; 2022 | Succeeded by Guo Yonghong |
| Preceded by Zhang Fuhai | Head of the Organization Department of Guangdong Provincial Committee of the Chinese Communist Party; 2022–2024 | Succeeded by Feng Zhonghua |
| Preceded by Zhang Yuzhuo | Communist Party Secretary of the State-owned Assets Supervision and Administration Commission of the State Council; 2026–present | Incumbent |
Government offices
| Preceded by Zhang Yuzhuo | Chairman of the State-owned Assets Supervision and Administration Commission of the State Council; 2026–present | Incumbent |
