= China Iron and Steel Association =

Chinese non-profit organization

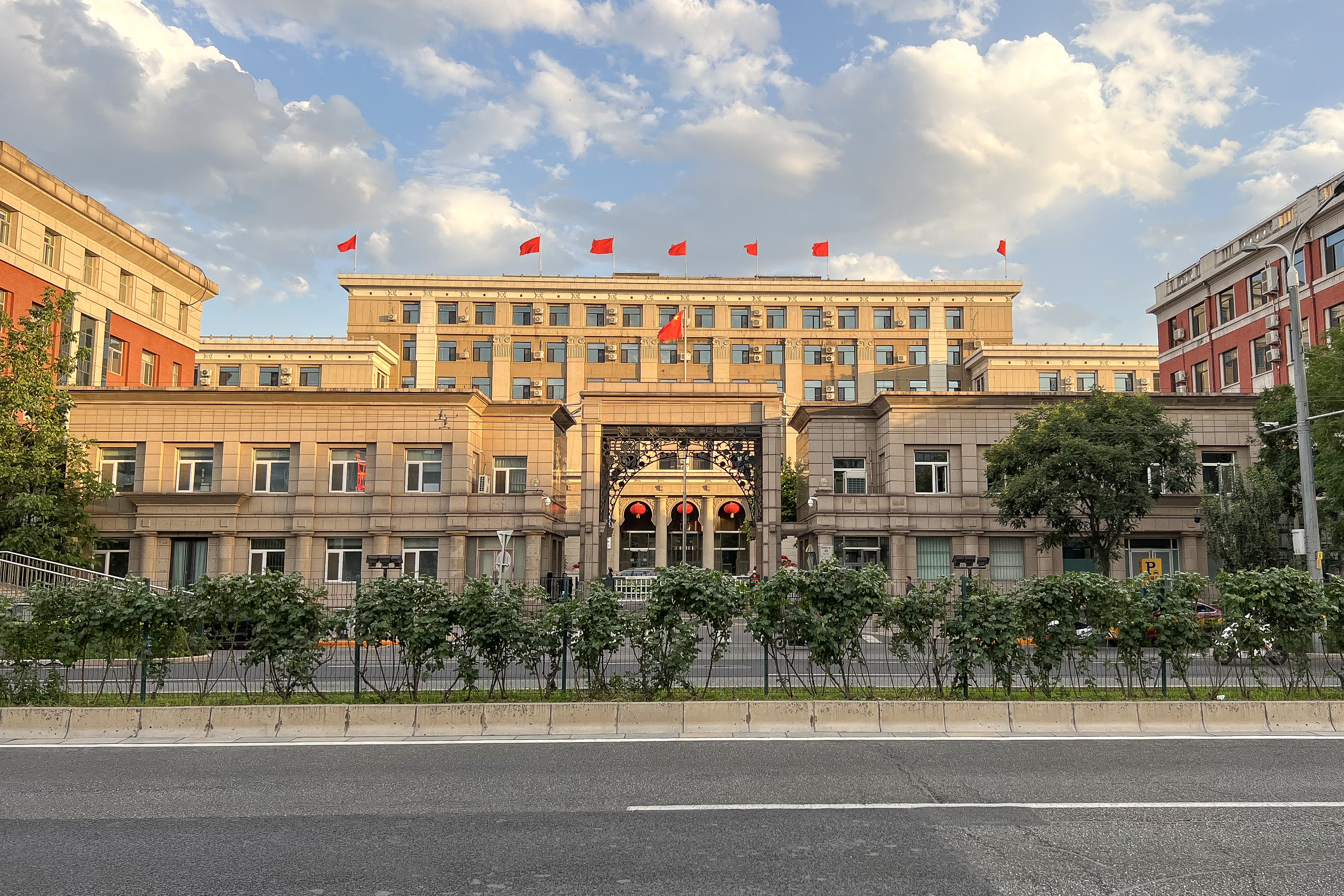
Headquarters

China Iron and Steel Association (CISA, Chinese: 中国钢铁工业协会) is a national, non-profit organization founded in 1999 on the basis of China Metallurgical Enterprise Management Association. CISA members consist of China's steel enterprises, institutions, societies and individuals in the iron and steel industry, which participate the organization voluntarily according to certain regulations.

== History ==
CISA was established in January 1999. By 2001, CISA represented 93% of domestic steel output and its membership had 75% of the domestic industry's employees.

CISA has often expressed the view that the major global mining companies engage in collusive pricing. CISA criticizes the Platts iron ore index, which it described in 2019 as compiled by foreign agencies which are not open and transparent and therefore not conducive to fair negotiations between Chinese state-owned enterprises and the Big four miners.

In 2009, the Chinese government appointed CISA to replace Baosteel as the lead negotiator in the global iron ore benchmark pricing negotiations.

In 2012, CISA along with the China Chamber of Commerce of Metals, Minerals & Chemicals Importers & Exporters, and the China Beijing International Mining Exchange created CBMX, an iron ore spot trading platform in China. In 2014, the CBMX platform was transferred to a Chinese and foreign joint venture (the Beijing Iron Ore Trading Center Corporation, or COREX) and ownership was broadened to include trading houses and the four largest Chinese steel mills, in addition to CISA.

== See also ==
- Industry of China
- Mining industry of China
- Steel industry in China
- Technological and industrial history of China
