= Zhi Shuping =

Chinese politician (born 1953)

- 支树平
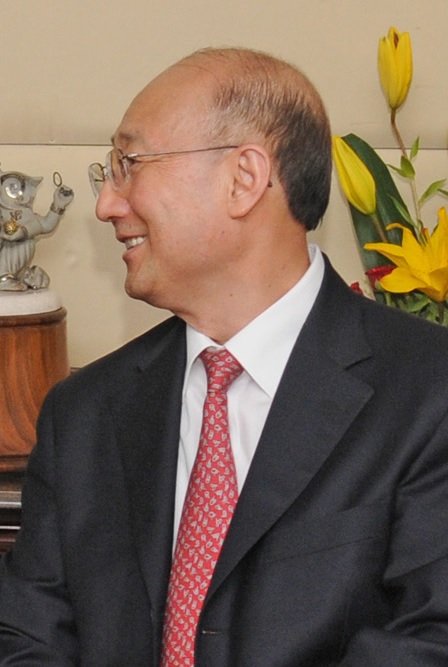
- Zhi Shuping in 2013

Director of the General Administration of Quality Supervision, Inspection and Quarantine
- In office August 2010 – March 2018
- Premier: Wen Jiabao; Li Keqiang
- Preceded by: Wang Yong
- Succeeded by: Position revoked

Personal details
- Born: June 1953 (age 73) Huairen County, Shanxi, China
- Party: Chinese Communist Party
- Education: Nankai University; Renmin University of China

Chinese name
- Simplified Chinese: 支树平
- Traditional Chinese: 支樹平
Transcriptions
Standard Mandarin
- Hanyu Pinyin: Zhī Shùpíng

Zhi Shuping (Chinese: 支树平; born June 1953) is a Chinese politician currently serving as vice chairperson of Proposal Committee of the National Committee of the Chinese people's Political Consultative Conference. Previously he served as director of the General Administration of Quality Supervision, Inspection and Quarantine. He is a member of the 13th Standing Committee of the Chinese People's Political Consultative Conference and a delegate to the 19th National Congress of the Chinese Communist Party. He was an alternate of the 16th Central Committee of the Chinese Communist Party, a member of the 17th Central Commission for Discipline Inspection, and a member of the 18th Central Committee of the Chinese Communist Party. He was a deputy to the 10th National People's Congress.

== Biography ==
Zhi was born in Huairen County, Shanxi, in June 1953. During the late Cultural Revolution, he taught at Zhuangkuang Middle School, a middle school affiliated to the Datong Mining Bureau, since July 1971. He joined the Chinese Communist Party (CCP) in March 1974. He eventually became secretary of the Youth League Committee of Datong Mining Bureau in September 1982. He served as deputy secretary of Shanxi Provincial Committee of the Communist Youth League in June 1985, and later promoted to the secretary position in November 1990. In July 1994, he became the deputy head of the Organization Department of CCP Shanxi Provincial Committee, rising to the head position the next year. In July 1995, he was admitted to member of the standing committee of the CCP Shanxi Provincial committee, the province's top authority.

In October 1998, he was assigned to the similar position in the neighboring Henan province in 2015. He was deputy party chief of Henan in November 2000, and held that office until October 2005.

He took office as deputy director of the General Administration of Quality Supervision, Inspection and Quarantine in October 2005, and rose to become director in August 2010. In March 2018, he was elected vice chairperson of Proposal Committee of the National Committee of the Chinese people's Political Consultative Conference.

== Works ==
- 奔向新世纪的青年工作 [Youth Work towards the New Century] (in Chinese). Taiyuan, Shanxi: Shanxi People's Publishing House. 1996. ISBN 9787203034582.
- 转型时期企业家成长的制度环境研究 [Research on the Institutional Environment of Entrepreneur Growth in the Transitional Period] (in Chinese). Beijing: Economic Science Press. 2005. ISBN 9787505849648.

Civic offices
Preceded by Jin Yinhuan	Secretary of Shanxi Provincial Committee of the Communist Youth League; 1990–1994	Succeeded by Liang Bin
Party political offices
Preceded by Zheng Shekui	head of the Organization Department of CCP Shanxi Provincial Committee; 1995–1998	Succeeded by Li Jingtian
Preceded by Huang Qingyi	Head of the Organization Department of CCP Henan Provincial Committee; 1998–2000	Succeeded by Chen Quanguo
Government offices
Preceded by Wang Yong	Director of the General Administration of Quality Supervision, Inspection and Quarantine; 2010–2018	Succeeded by Position revoked
