= Li Rongrong =

Chinese politician (1945–2019)

Li Rongrong (Chinese: 李荣融; 1945 – 21 December 2019) was a Chinese politician who served as inaugural Chairman of the State-owned Assets Supervision and Administration Commission (SASAC)

== Biography ==
Li Rongrong was a Chinese politician who served as Chairman of SASAC.

Li was born in Suzhou, Jiangsu, Republic of China. He graduated from the department of chemical engineering of Tianjin University, majoring in electro-chemistry.

He started working in a factory in Wuxi in July 1968, and was elevated to head of the factory in the early 1980s. From 1986, he served as vice director of economics commission of Wuxi, director of light manufacturing bureau, director of planning commission of the city, and vice director of economics planning commission of Jiangsu.

In June 1992, he was transferred to manufacturing planning bureau of manufacturing office of the State Council. From August 1992, he served in various posts in State Economic and Trade Commission (SETC). He was appointed vice director of the Commission in 1998, and became vice director and vice Chinese Communist Party (CCP) chief of the Commission in December 1999. In February 2001, he was elevated to director and CCP chief of SETC. He served as the chairman and CCP committee secretary of State-owned Assets Supervision and Administration Commission (SASAC) of the State Council. Li was SASAC's first director.

As the head of SASAC, Li classified industrial sectors based on importance and level of state supervision. Li viewed national security and economic lifeline sectors (such as the electrical grid and petroleum) as subject to absolute state control. In fundamental and pillar industries (such as automobiles and steel), key companies should have absolute or relative state control. In other industries (such as agriculture or transportation), the state should maintain holdings in industry leaders. In 2009, Li praised the role of China's state-owned enterprises (SOEs) in stabilizing the economy and preserving economic growth, in light of the state's ability to direct SOEs to spend, invest, and avoid laying off workers.

Li's views on SOEs, particularly regarding the structuring of boards of directors, were in part influenced his study of the Singapore's experience with Temasek, one of its major SOEs.

He was a member of 16th and 17th Central Committee of the Chinese Communist Party.

Li died on 21 December 2019 in Beijing, aged 74.
