= Wang Yong (politician, born 1955) =

Chinese politician

- 王勇
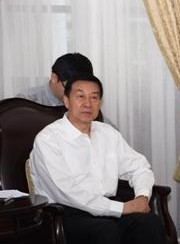

Vice Chairman of the Chinese People's Political Consultative Conference
- Incumbent
- Assumed office 10 March 2023
- Chairman: Wang Huning

State Councilor of China
- In office 16 March 2013 – 12 March 2023
- Premier: Li Keqiang

Head of the State-owned Assets Supervision and Administration Commission
- In office 24 August 2010 – March 2013
- Premier: Wen Jiabao; Li Keqiang
- Preceded by: Li Rongrong
- Succeeded by: Jiang Jiemin

Personal details
- Born: December 1955 (age 70) Gaizhou, Liaoning
- Party: Chinese Communist Party
- Education: Harbin Institute of Technology
- Website: www.gov.cn/wangyong

Wang Yong (Chinese: 王勇; born December 1955 in Gaizhou) is a Chinese politician who is currently a vice chairman of the Chinese People's Political Consultative Conference. He previously served as a State Councilor of the People's Republic of China from 2013 to 2023.

From September 2008 to August 2010 he was the Director of the General Administration of Quality Supervision, Inspection and Quarantine (AQSIQ). He then serves as the head of the State-owned Assets Supervision and Administration Commission (SASAC) between August 2010 and March 2013. He was appointed as State Councilor in March 2013 and served as one until March 2023. In the same month, he was appointed a CPPCC vice chairman.

== Early life and education ==
Wang was born in December 1955 in Gaizhou, Liaoning. When he was 14, Wang was sent to the countryside as a part of the Educated Youth program and began working at the Heilongjiang Production and Construction Corps. In August 1974, Wang joined the Chinese Communist Party (CCP). Wang studied at Beijing Radio and Television University from 1979 to 1982, earning a B.S. in electrical engineering, and the Harbin Institute of Technology from 1989 to 1992, earning a M.S. in engineering.

== Career ==
In 1977, Wang began working at Factory 30 under the former Seventh Ministry of Machinery Industry, where he worked for two years. Following his college education in engineering, he returned to Factory 30 (which was now under the control of the Ministry of Aerospace Industry) and worked there until 1997, earning the title of Director and Deputy Secretary of the Party Committee for Factory 30.

In 1997, Wang was transferred to the China Aerospace Corporation, where he worked as the deputy director for the political department. He would later serve as the director of the personnel and labor bureau and as the deputy general manager of the corporation.

In 1998, his political career began when Wang was appointed Deputy Secretary of the Beijing Committee of the CCP.

In 2000, Wang was appointed to the CCP's Organization Department.

In 2003, Wang was transferred to the State-owned Assets Supervision and Administration Commission of the State Council, becoming deputy director. He was appointed Deputy Secretary-General of this commission in 2008.

In 2008, Wang was appointed Director and Party Secretary of the General Administration of Quality Supervision, Inspection, and Quarantine following the 2008 Chinese milk scandal. He served in this position until 2010.

In 2010, Wang was appointed Director and Secretary of the Party Committee of the State-owned Assets Supervision and Administration Commission of the State Council following Li Rongrong's retirement.

In 2013, during the 12th National People's Congress, Wang was appointed a State Councilor of the National People's Congress by Premier Li Keqiang. He was nominated for, and won, the position again during the 13th National People's Congress.

Wang was a full member of the 18th, 19th, and 20th CCP Central Committee.

== Personal life ==
In 2010, he was named by Forbes Magazine the 62nd World's Most Powerful Person.
