= General Administration of Quality Supervision, Inspection and Quarantine =

- 中华人民共和国国家质量监督检验检疫总局

Agency overview
- Preceding agency: State Bureau of Quality and Technological Supervision
- Dissolved: 2018
- Superseding agency: State Administration for Market Regulation
- Parent department: State Council of China
- Website: english.aqsiq.gov.cn (archived)

The General Administration of Quality Supervision, Inspection and Quarantine of the People's Republic of China (Chinese: 中华人民共和国国家质量监督检验检疫总局, abbreviated AQSIQ) was a ministerial-level non-cabinet department under the State Council of the People's Republic of China that was in charge of national quality, metrology, entry-exit commodity inspection, entry-exit health quarantine, entry-exit animal and plant quarantine, import-export food safety, certification and accreditation, standardization, as well as administrative law enforcement.

AQSIQ directly administers provincial Entry-Exit Inspection and Quarantine Bureaus and Bureaus of Quality and Technical Supervision. For example, the Beijing Entry-Exit Inspection and Quarantine Bureau is responsible for collecting health declaration forms, and used thermal imaging to spot passengers with fever due to the 2009 flu pandemic prior to July 16, 2009.

== History ==
AQSIQ was formed as the successor government body to the State Bureau of Quality and Technological Supervision (SBQTS).

In 2005, AQSIQ established a sui generis system to cover the use of geographical indication products through the 2005 Provisions on the Protection of GI Products. These regulations establish protection and requirements for products using place names if (1) the product is grown or bred from a certain place name location and all of the raw materials come from that place, (2) products produced elsewhere but for which all of the raw materials come from the place name location, and (3) products where some of the raw materials come from elsewhere but are produced in the place name location using specialized techniques. This approach is intended to accommodate the use of geographical indications in handicrafts like embroidery or ceramics. The regulation sets strict standards for products produced under the geographical indication, and non-compliance results in a producer losing the ability to use the place name.

In 2018, the AQSIQ was merged with the newly created State Administration for Market Regulation as part of the deepening the reform of the Party and state institutions.

== List of heads ==
1. Li Changjiang (April 2001 – September 2008)
2. Wang Yong (September 2008 – August 2010)
3. Zhi Shuping (August 2010 – March 2018)
- Hou Jianguo served as party secretary from May 2017 to March 2018.

== See also ==
- Standardization Administration of China (SAC)
- Food safety in China
- Chinese protein export contamination
- Exit & Entry Permit (Republic of China)
