= Li Changjiang =

Chinese politician

Li Changjiang (Chinese: 李长江; born October 1944) was minister and Chinese Communist Party (CCP) party chief of the General Administration of Quality Supervision, Inspection and Quarantine of the People's Republic of China (AQSIQ).

== Biography ==
Born in Shuangcheng, Heilongjiang, Li joined the CCP in December 1965, and started working in July 1970. He graduated from the Changchun Institute of Fine Optical Mechanics (now the Changchun University of Science and Technology), majoring in the design and manufacture of optical devices. He holds the title of vice research fellow at the University.

=== Career ===
He formerly served as the governor assistant and vice governor of Zhejiang Province. In 2001, he was appointed minister and vice party chief of the General Administration of Quality Supervision, Inspection and Quarantine, and became minister and party chief of that administration in 2008. According to the Daily Telegraph, "Mr Li became a celebrity [in 2007] for his handling of the row over poisoned Chinese exports, which began with pet food tainted with melamine and moved on to lead-coated toys. He said it was a "foreign plot" by Western countries to protect themselves from Chinese imports."

He has been a member of the 16th and 17th Central Committees of the Chinese Communist Party.

=== Resignation ===
Li was forced to resign in September 2008 after a State Council investigation concluded that he and Shijiazhuang Party Secretary Wu Xianguo were responsible for the "vital food safety incident", namely the dairy scandal which shook China.

=== Coming back ===
He was appointed vice director of the Office of Sweeping Pornography and Striking Illegal Publications (transliteration of 全國掃黃打非工作小組, which lacks an official translation to English) in December 2009.
