= Go Out policy =

Chinese policy supporting overseas investment

Go Out policy (Chinese: 走出去战略; pinyin: Zǒuchūqù Zhànlüè) or the Going Global Strategy is the People's Republic of China's current strategy to encourage its enterprises to invest overseas. The policy was announced as a national strategy by general secretary of the Chinese Communist Party Jiang Zemin in March 2000.

== History ==
China's Two Markets, Two Resources policy predated the Go Out policy and subsequently regarded as related to the Go Out policy. Two Markets, Two Resources, emphasizes leveraging domestic supply sources of resources (including through increased investment in prospecting and mining) and international sources of resources (through various strategies, including foreign acquisition, investment, short-term purchasing, and long-term purchase contracts). Also related, the One Third, One Third, One Third policy prescribes that in procuring natural resources, one third of China's supply should come from domestic production, one third from direct procurement contracts, and one third from foreign acquisitions.

CCP General Secretary Jiang Zemin first began encouraging domestic enterprises to "go global" and enter foreign markets in 1996, a time when the domestic market was showing signs of stagnation. In Jiang's view, Going Out into foreign markets was necessary to advance China's development. In February 1998 at the Second Plenary Session of the Fifteenth Central Committee of the CCP, Jiang stated that as part of the policy on responding to the Asian Financial Crisis, leaders should encourage exports and support powerful state-owned enterprises in setting up factories overseas. Jiang formally announced it as a national strategy in March 2000. The policy was implemented top-down from central government leadership. The policy it was incorporated into the report of the 16th National Congress of the Chinese Communist Party. During Jiang's tenure, the policy greatly expanded China's investment and influence in global South countries, especially those in Africa and Asia.

Pursuant to the Go Out policy, by the end of 2001, China was participating in more than 195 overseas resource projects, invested more than US$8.4 billion to establish more than 6,610 overseas enterprises, and signed a total of US$26.8 billion for foreign labor services. In the early 2000s, Chinese enterprises were generally unable to compete with enterprises from the more industrially developed countries and frequently accepted projects in which those enterprises were not interested.

The 16th National Party Congress Report in November 2002 stated that going out was a "major measure taken in a new stage of China's reform and opening movement". Academic Wendy Leutert writes that the Report marked a change from earlier statements on the Go Out policy by proposing a comprehensive and long-term economic shift towards an international focus.

State-owned enterprises have been some of the most high-profile entities investing overseas as part of the Go Out policy. Significant SOEs involved in Going Out include China National Petroleum Company. Pursuant to the Go Out policy, SOEs began to engage in foreign mergers and acquisitions to increase access to raw materials, resourced, and energy deemed critical.

The Go Out policy accelerated rapidly after the 2008 financial crisis.

China's sovereign funds have supported efforts to Go Out, including by helping Chinese enterprises finance mergers and acquisitions abroad. In 2015 for example, China Investment Corporation turned one of its divisions into the wholly owned subsidiary CIC Capital. This move was intended to support the Belt and Road Initiative including by conducting foreign direct investment and by supporting state-owned enterprises of China engaged in mergers and acquisitions in economic sectors prioritized by the state.

In 2015, the Ministry of Agriculture issued the Strategic Plan for Agricultural Going Out, providing state subsidies to enterprises that invested in various overseas locations.

As of at least 2024, and unlike the early days of the Go Out policy, many Chinese enterprises are internationally competitive and able to competitively in the more developed markets.

== Examples ==
Emerging markets have been an important part of China's going out strategy. China began to engage in digital initiatives with the Global South, such as telecommunications projects, as part of going out since 1999.

=== Overseas SEZs ===
From 1990 to 2018, Chinese enterprises established eleven SEZs in sub-Saharan Africa and the Middle East including: Nigeria (two), Zambia, Djibouti, Kenya, Mauritius, Mauritania, Egypt, Oman, and Algeria. Generally, the Chinese government takes a hands-off approach, leaving it to Chinese enterprises to work to establish such zones (although it does provide support in the form of grants, loans, and subsidies, including support via the China Africa Development Fund). These zones fall within the Chinese policy to go out and compete globally.

The first Chinese overseas SEZs facilitated the offshoring of labor-intensive and less competitive industries, for example in textiles. As Dawn C. Murphy summarizes, these zones now "aim to transfer China's development successes to other countries, increase business opportunities for China manufacturing companies, avoid trade barriers by setting up zones in countries with preferential trade access to important markets, and create a positive business environment for Chinese small and medium-sized enterprises investing in these regions."

=== Africa ===
Africa is among the emerging markets important to China's going out strategy, and Chinese direct investment in Africa rose from $1 billion in 2004 to $24.5 billion by 2013. Within Africa, Ethiopia is a particularly emphasized place where Chinese companies should "go out" to, with Chinese top leadership describing Ethiopia as a "bridge" between the Belt and Road Initiative and Africa's development, as well as "a pilot country for China-Africa production capacity cooperation."

Since the mid-1990s, China has encouraged its agricultural enterprises to seek economic opportunities abroad as part of its go out policy, including to Africa. Chinese policy guidance has specifically encouraged such efforts in rubber, oil palm, cotton, vegetable cultivation, animal husbandry, aquaculture, and assembly of agriculture machines. The encouragement for agricultural enterprises to go out has also resulted in the creation of Agricultural Technology Demonstration Centers in African countries. The function of these centers is to transmit agricultural expertise and technology from China to developing countries in Africa while also creating market opportunities for Chinese companies in the agricultural sector. China is motivated to establish these centers out of both an ideological commitment to fostering South-South cooperation and sharing its experience with less developed countries and by a pragmatic desire to increase its long-term food security.

China first announced its Agricultural Technology Demonstrations Centers at the 2006 meeting of the Forum on China-Africa Cooperation. It launched 19 of these centers between 2006 and 2018, all in sub-Saharan Africa. As of 2023, ATDCs have been established in 24 African countries.

=== Southeast Asia ===
Southeast Asia has been a major recipient of Chinese investment prompted by the Go Out policy. Chinese foreign direct investment in southeast Asia is primarily in sectors like mining, energy, industrial parks, and infrastructure. As of 2024, Chinese investment in agriculture in southeast Asia is comparatively small but growing.

=== Energy ===
Policy support offered to facilitate Going Out resulted in rapid growth in China's energy and natural sources sectors.

Because the more accessible oil resources had already been claimed, when China National Petroleum Company and other enterprises went out, they tended to enter less politically stable countries with greater political and security risks.

=== Mining ===
Policy support offered to advance the objectives of Going Out enabled the expansion of China's mining industry, including through supporting mining investment that could not have otherwise been economically viable.

== See also ==
- Economy of China
- Foreign policy of the People's Republic of China
