= Great Sea Interconnector =

Planned submarine electricity cable

Great Sea Interconnector (GSI)
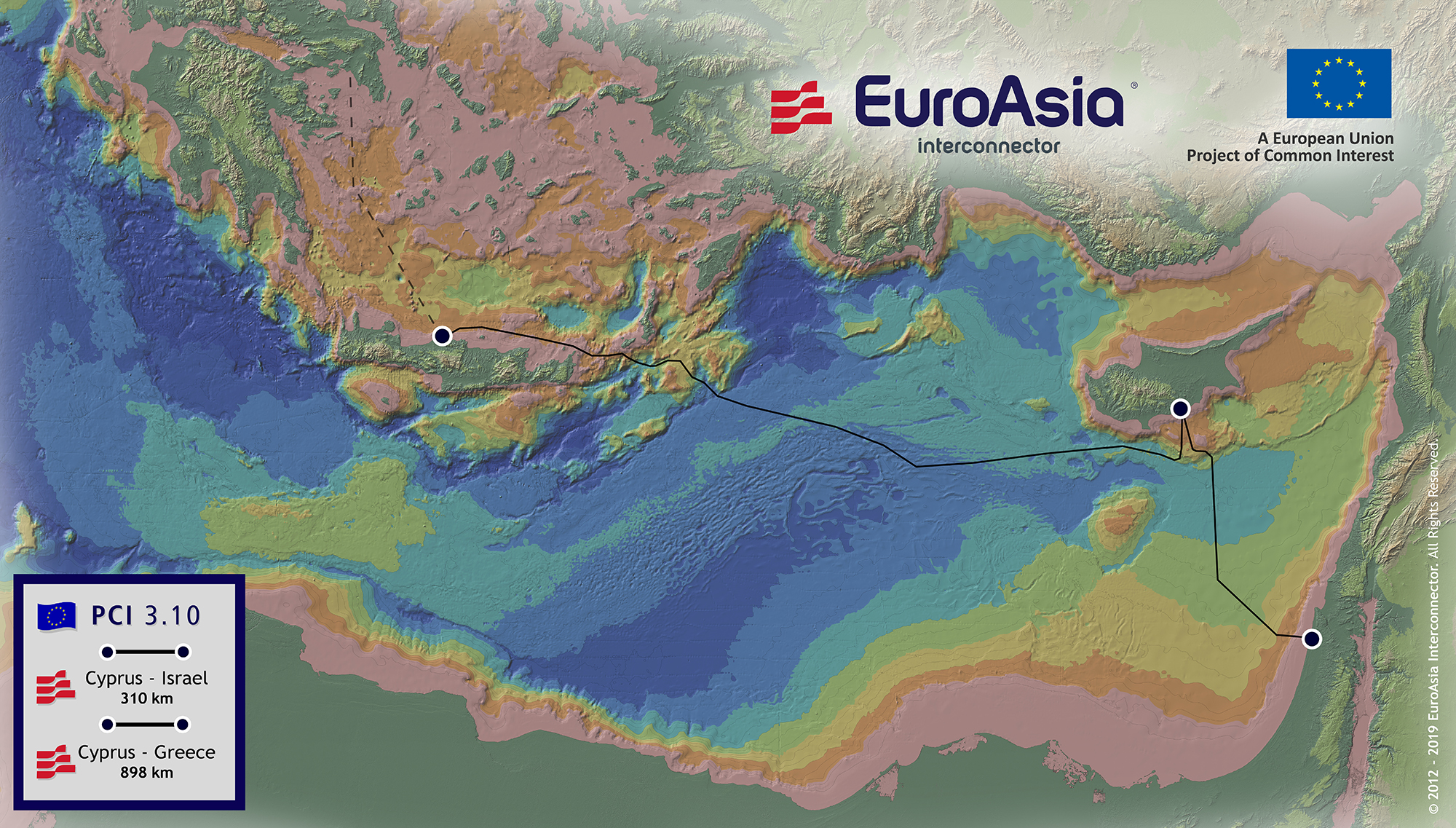
- Map of Great Sea Interconnector (GSI)

Location
- Founded: 2010
- Headquarters: Nicosia, Cyprus
- Services: Electrical grid Electric power transmission
- Country: Cyprus; Greece; Israel
- From: Hadera, Israel
- Passes through: Kofinou, Cyprus
- To: Korakias, Crete, Greece

Ownership information
- Owner: EuroAsia Interconnector Ltd.
- Key people: Chairman: Christopher Pissarides
- CEO: Nasos Ktorides
- Project director: George Killas
- Operator: EuroAsia Interconnector Ltd.

Construction information
- Construction cost: €2.5 billion (Stage 1)

Technical information
- Type: Submarine power cable
- Current type: HVDC
- Total length: 1,208 km (751 mi)
- Capacity: 2,000 MW (1,000 MW in phase 1)
- DC voltage: ±500 kV
- No. of poles: 2

The Great Sea Interconnector (GSI), formerly known as the EuroAsia Interconnector is a planned HVDC interconnector between the Greek, Cypriot, and Israeli power grids via the world's longest submarine power cable, with a length of 310 kilometres (190 mi) from Israel to Cyprus and 898 kilometres (558 mi) from Cyprus to Greece for a total of 1,208 kilometres (751 mi).

Connecting Kofinou, Cyprus to Hadera, Israel and Korakias, Crete, Greece, the EuroAsia Interconnector is a major Project of Common Interest (PCI) of the European Union and a priority Electricity Highway Interconnector Project as an energy highway bridging Asia and Europe.

On 12 May 2017, the Greek Prime Minister Alexis Tsipras met the State Grid Corporation of China Chairman Shu Yinbiao in Beijing, and CEO of EuroAsia Interconnector Nasos Ktorides supported the timely implementation of the EuroAsia Interconnector. On 12 December 2017 transmission system operator Elia announced the conclusion of a strategic alliance agreement for the development and implementation of the 2,000 MW interconnector.

On 8 March 2021, Cyprus, Greece and Israel signed an initial agreement to build the world's largest and deepest submarine power cable that will connect the three Mediterranean countries' power grids.

President of the European Commission Ursula von der Leyen visited Cyprus on 8 July 2021 and officially presented EU approval for the Cyprus plan to spend €1.2 billion under the EU Recovery and Resilience Plan. EuroAsia Interconnector got €100 million funding from EU Recovery and Resilience Plan.

On 26 January 2022, the European Commission approved €657 million under the Connecting Europe Facility (CEF) for EuroAsia Interconnector.

The inauguration ceremony on the start of the construction works were held on 14 October 2022, at the Presidential Palace in Nicosia.

News about the suspension of the project rose in March 2025 following Turkey's objections. Still, an undersea cable connecting the Greek mainland to Crete was completed in May 2025, and in August 2025 the cabinet of ministers of the Cypriot government discussed the issue of the yearly compensation of 25 million euros following the decision of the Cypriot Energy Regulatory Authority.

Following French involvement in the project in 2026, the sea surveys were restarted in November 2026 in the region between the Greek island of Karpathos and Cyprus.

The projected completion date of the interconnector between Cyprus and Greece is expected by the end of 2031. The European Commission has re-iterated its support and preference of the GSI over any alternatives proposed by Turkey to connect Cyprus to Turkey's energy grid.

== Energy in Cyprus, Greece and Israel ==
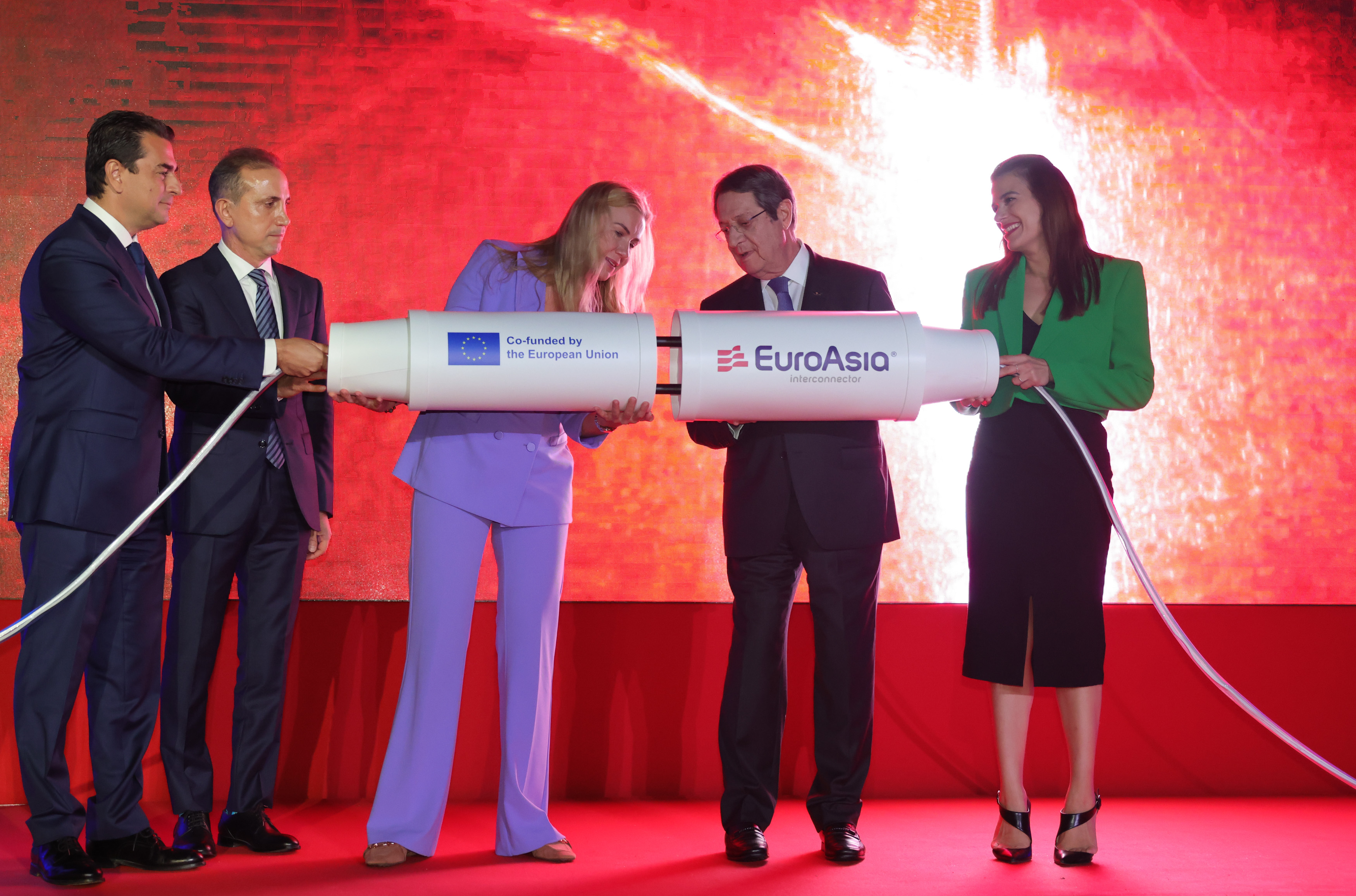
The inauguration ceremony of Interconnector held on 14 October 2022, was attended by EU Commissioner for Energy Kadri Simson, President of Cyprus Nicos Anastasiades, Greek and Cypriot Energy Ministers Kostas Skrekas and Natasa Pilides and CEO EuroAsia Interconnector Nasos Ktorides

=== Energy in Cyprus ===
Cyprus as an island is totally isolated from EU energy links and electricity networks and remains the most energy dependent country in the European Union. Cyprus is completely isolated from EU energy interconnections. About 95% of the primary energy use was imported in 2015. Oil and petroleum products represent around 92% of the gross energy consumption. Cyprus has no oil refineries. As a result of high import cost of petroleum products the price of electricity is one of the highest in the European Union. Renewable energy share has reached 8% and according to national targets should reach 13% by 2020. Recently Cyprus announced discovery of the Aphrodite gas field with significant amounts of natural gas resources in its exclusive economic zone (EEZ), and additional gas prospects are being explored. Due to regional turmoil in the Eastern Mediterranean region and the fact that 1/3 of Cyprus is unlawfully occupied, for energy security it needs a reliable and robust energy infrastructure. The EuroAsia Interconnector will connect Cyprus to the European electricity grid as the last EU member fully isolated from energy interconnections.

=== Energy in Israel ===
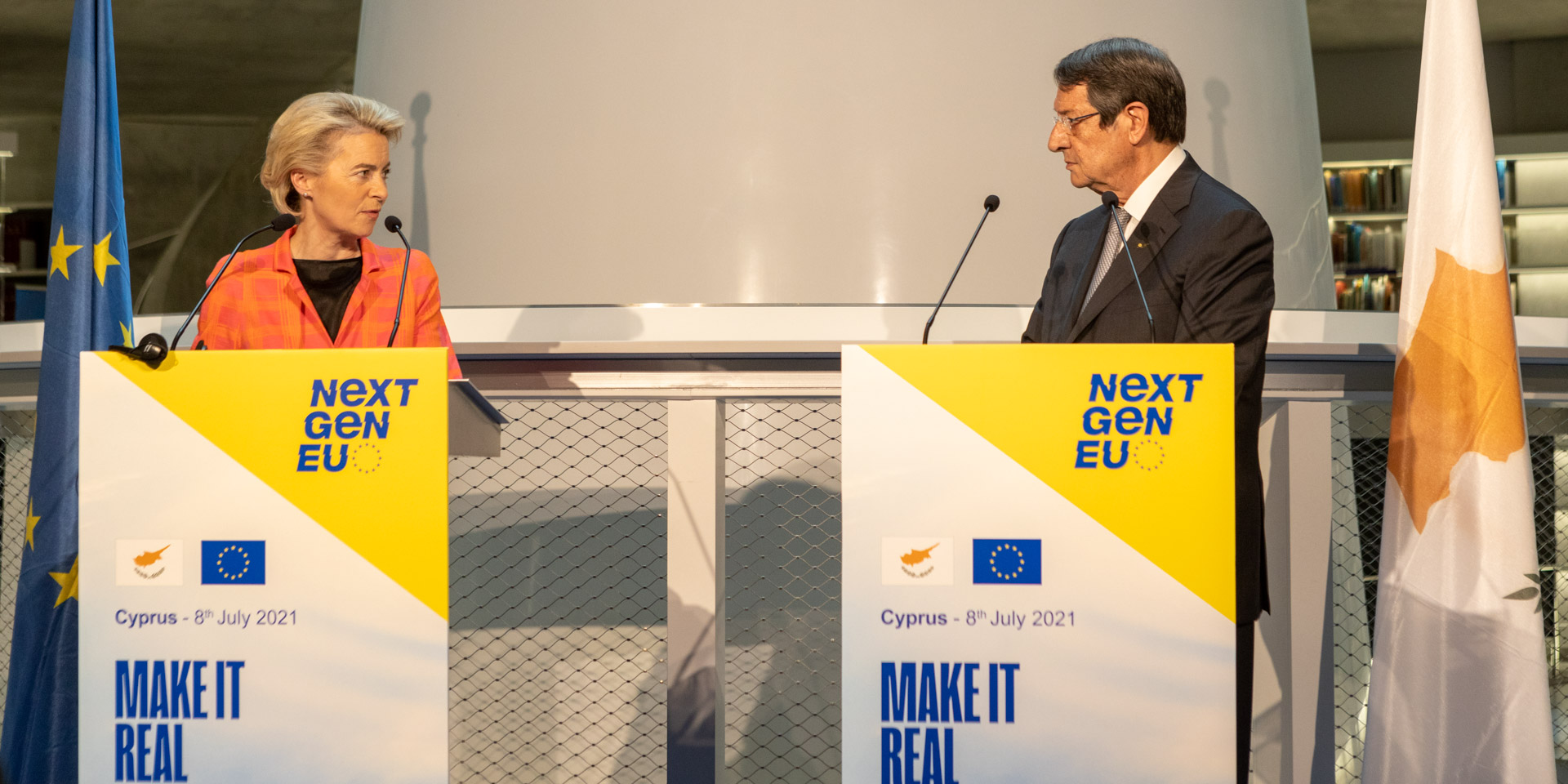
President of the European Commission Ursula von der Leyen at the University of Cyprus on 8 July 2021, announces approval and funding of €100 million for EuroAsia Interconnector out of the Cyprus RRP programme.

Israel's relationship with neighbors links politics and diplomacy with energy supply and security. Until recently domestic Israeli primary energy production was small. The country was dependent on imports of oil and coal, so that in 2012 only 13% of its energy balance was supplied from domestic resources. In 2010, the Leviathan gas field was discovered off the coast of Israel. This gas field represents a strategic change enabling Israel not only to be energy independent, but also to become an energy exporter, as the amount of gas discovered exceeds Israeli demands for at least 50 years. Unlike oil, gas is more difficult to ship and is not sold on spot markets, being priced uniquely for each deal. One reliable way for Israel to export natural gas could be in form of electricity using the Interconnector.

The EuroAsia Interconnector is planned to link up with both Israel and its settlements in the West Bank, and has led to Siemens, which has been announced as the preferred bidder for part of the system, becoming a target of the Boycott, Divestment and Sanctions movement.

=== Energy in Greece ===
Greece's location at the crossroads of East and West and geographical connection to rest of Europe enables interconnection and energy flow from the Eastern Mediterranean to Europe. Greece is a highly energy-dependent country. Renewable energy share has reached 22%.

== Eastern Mediterranean Hydrocarbon Findings ==
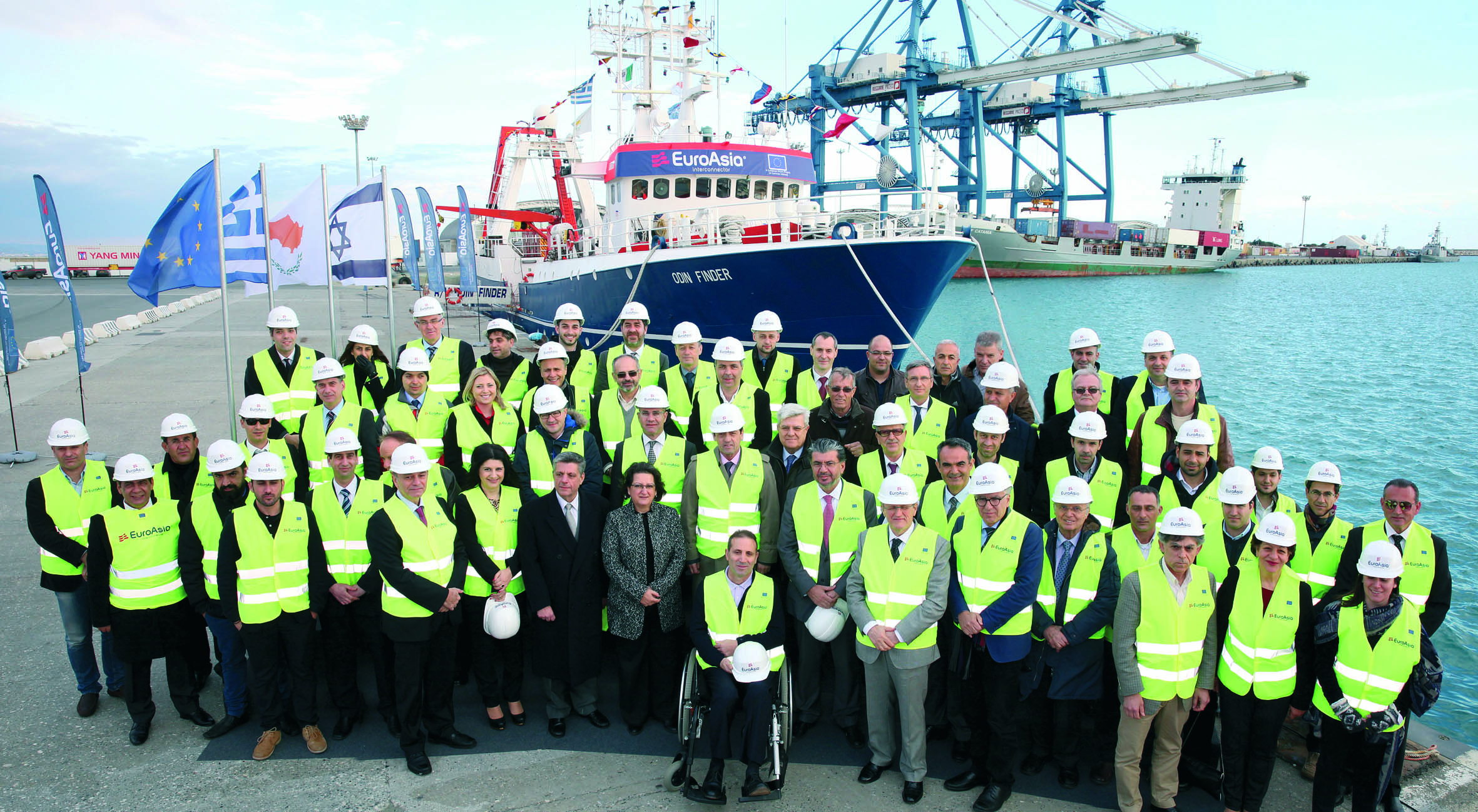
In January 2016, the Italian research ship Odin Finder started a reconnaissance study for the optimum route of EuroAsia Interconnector

The Levantine Sea is bounded by Greece, Turkey, Syria, Lebanon, Israel, and Egypt. Cyprus is the largest island in the Levantine Sea and it is located in the middle of it. Many countries in the region are in disputes with neighbors. The seafloor of the Eastern Mediterranean Basin is dotted with mud volcanoes which spew gas and occasionally oil into the benthic zone. Geologically it consists of sediment columns up to 12 km thick capped by evaporites. These geological and oceanographic facts led to speculation that Levantine sea contains large gas and oil deposits trapped in evaporites. Recently, energy company Eni discovered the Zohr gas field, the largest known gas field in the Mediterranean. The Zohr gas field holds around 850 billion cubic metres (30 trillion cubic feet) of gas. It is estimated that in the Levant Basin there are around 3.5 trillion cubic metres (120 trillion cubic feet) of undiscovered gas resources. Additionally, they estimated that there could be up to 1.7 billion barrels of recoverable oil.

=== Israeli and Cypriot gas fields ===
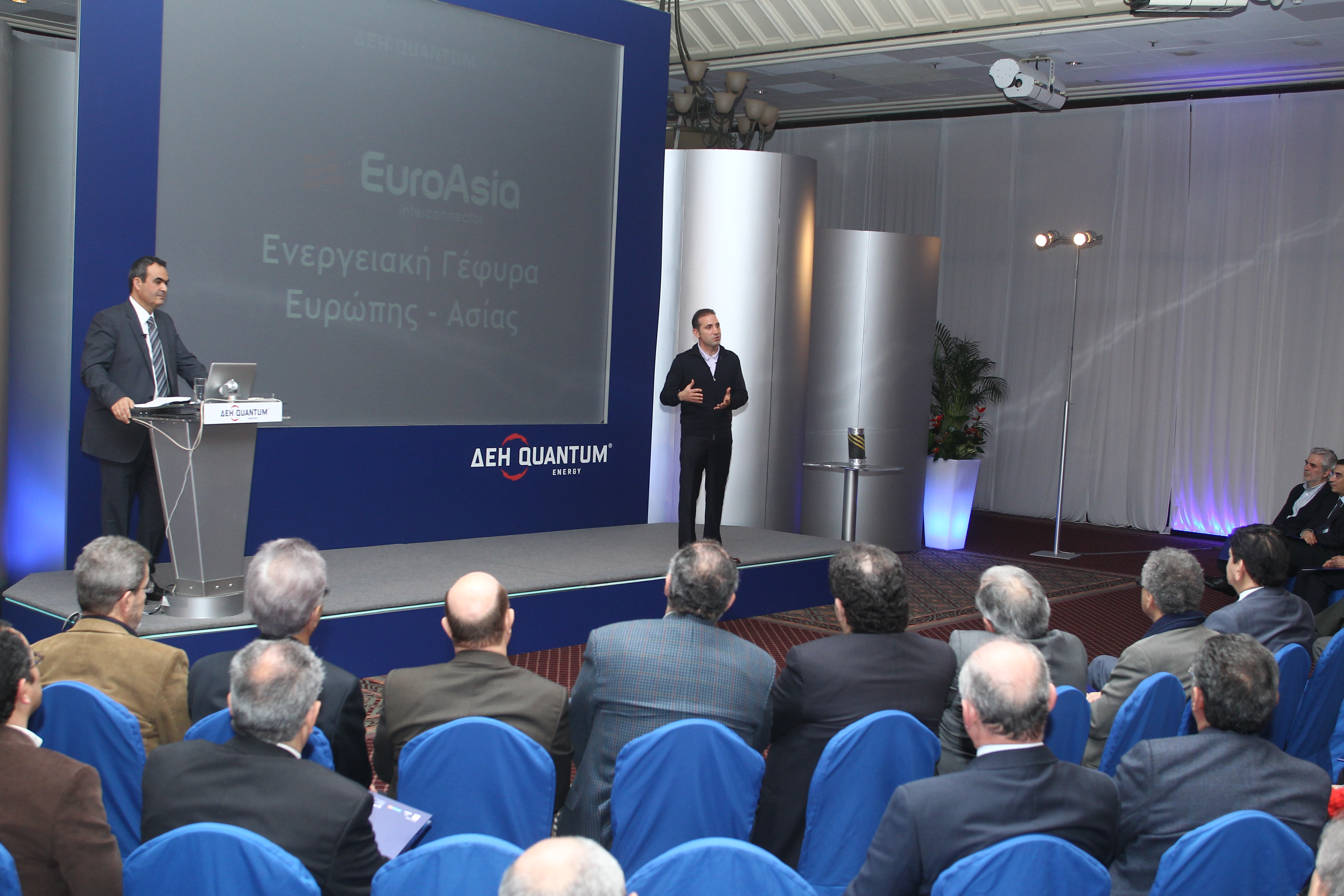
Interconnector was announced by Nasos Ktorides in Nicosia on 23. January 2012

The Aphrodite gas field is Cyprus's offshore gas field at the exploratory drilling block 12 in the Cyprus Exclusive Economic Zone. It is estimated that block 12 holds 110 to 140 billion cubic metres (3.9×10^{12} to 4.9×10^{12} cu ft) of natural gas. Exploration is continuing in other blocks in the Cyprus EEZ. The Calypso gas field in block 6 was found in 2018, and it is estimated that it holds 170 to 230 billion cubic metres (6.0×10^{12} to 8.1×10^{12} cu ft) of gas.

The first significant Israeli gas discovery was 28 billion cubic metres (990×10^{9} cu ft) in the Mari-B field in 2000. The Mari-B field produced gas until 2013, covering 40% of Israeli natural gas demand. Offshore Tamar gas field of 280 billion cubic metres (9.9×10^{12} cu ft) was discovered in 2009, with commercial production starting in 2013. It covers nearly all industrial needs and gas from Tamar field generates over half of the country's electricity. In 2010, the Leviathan gas field was discovered off the coast of Israel. It is estimated the field contains around 470 billion cubic metres (17×10^{12} cu ft) of natural gas.

== Infrastructure ==
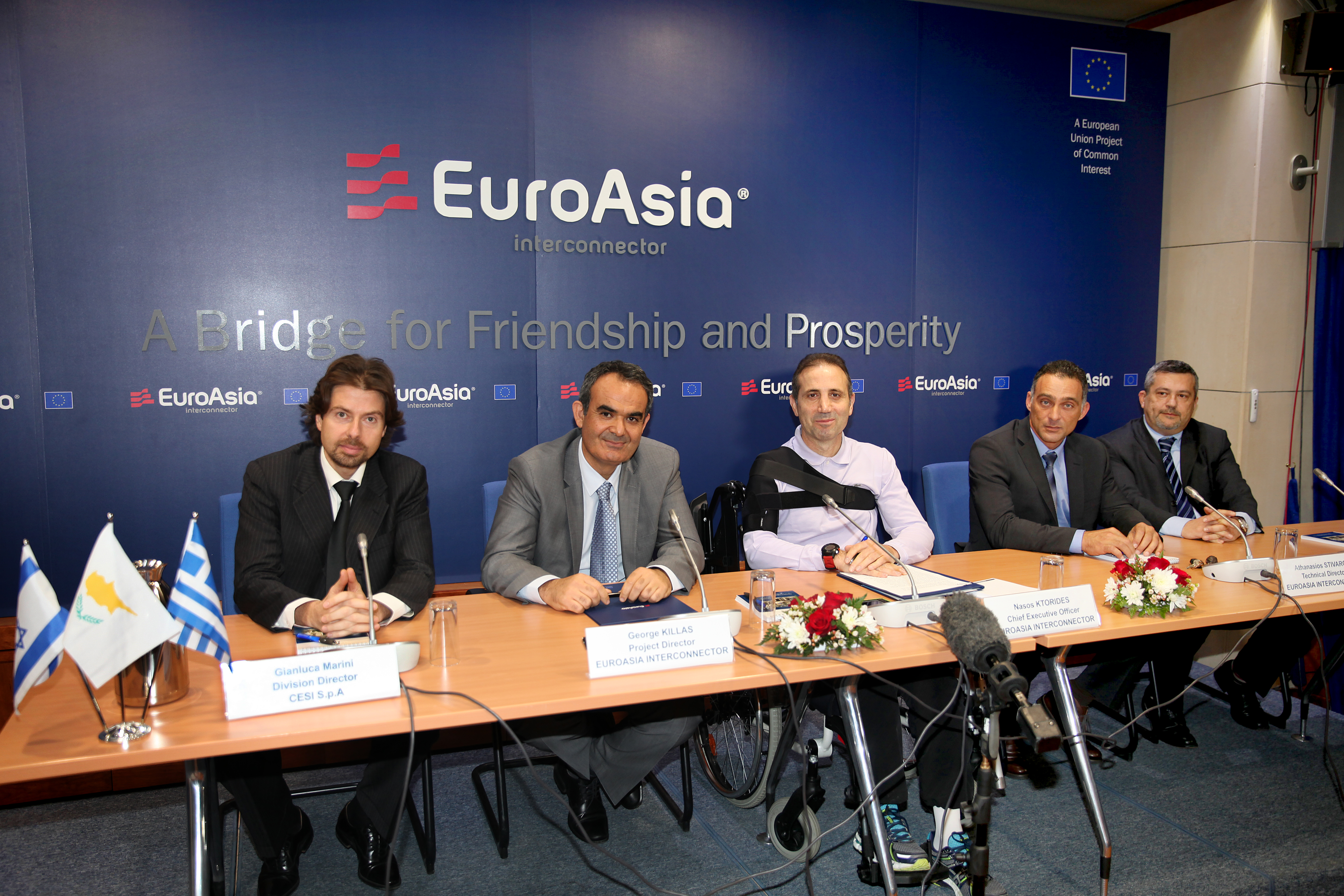
Signing ceremony at the European house in Nicosia, Cyprus, where the three studies were awarded to the Italian companies CESI and GAS

The EuroAsia Interconnector will link Israel with Cypriot and Greek power grids with high-voltage direct current submarine power cable of length around 1,208-kilometre (751 mi). It will have a capacity to transmit 2,000 megawatts of electricity in either direction. The 310-kilometre (190 mi) cable will link Israel with Cyprus. Cyprus will be connected with the Greek island of Crete with 898-kilometre (558 mi) long cable. The laying depth of the cable will be up to 3,000 metres (9,800 ft) under sea level in some areas between Crete and Cyprus. It will be conducted in two stages.

In the first stage it will have 1000 MW capacity. It is expected to cost €2.5 billion in the first stage. Interconnection between Hadera in Israel and Kofinou on Cyprus will be finished in December 2025. The longer interconnection between Kofinou on Cyprus and Korakias on Crete will be delivered in December 2025.

=== Configuration for Stage 1 ===
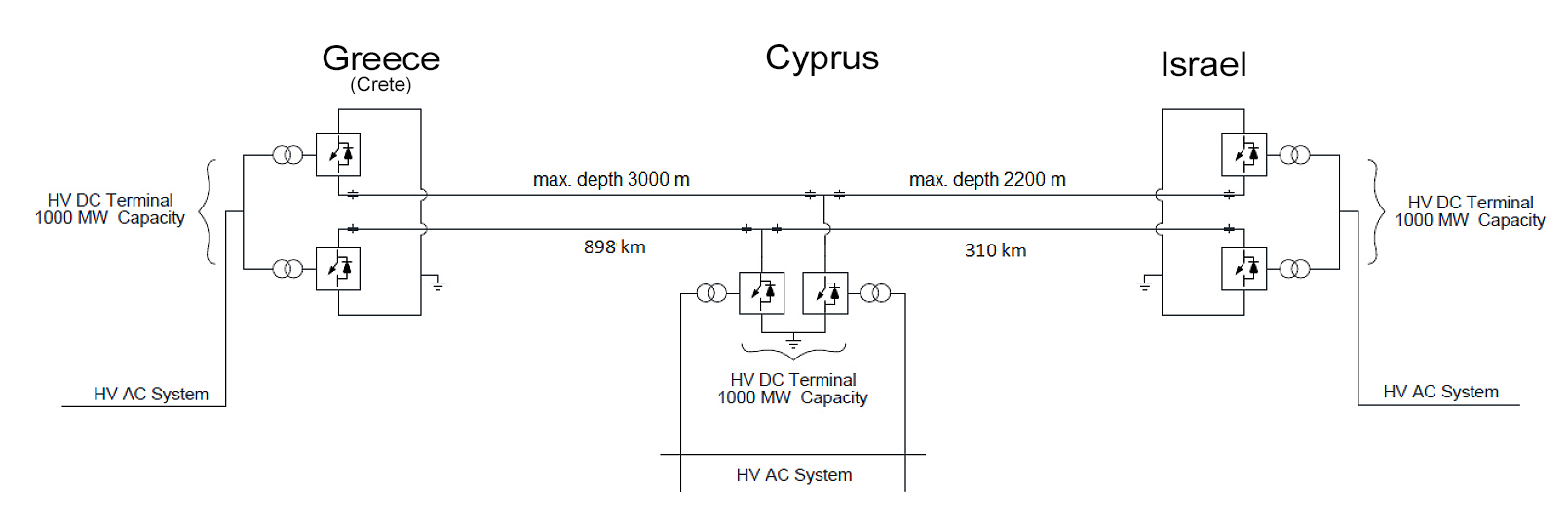
Conceptual diagram of EuroAsia Interconnector-Stage 1

The Interconnector will provide an important electricity highway in Southeastern EU and ends the electricity energy isolation of Cyprus, interconnecting EU and Israel. The Interconnector's main components are:

- 3 converter stations in bipolar arrangements with multiterminal operation (in Greece (Crete), Cyprus and Israel)
- Subsea and land high-voltage direct current (HVDC) cables that will interconnect converter stations in Greece, Cyprus and Israel. Cables will run in pairs and each cable will be with power rating of 500 MW and voltage of 500kV.
- Sea electrodes of 1000A and medium voltage direct current cables connecting them to converter stations
- Alternating current (AC) switchgear connecting converter stations to the local electricity grid at four different locations

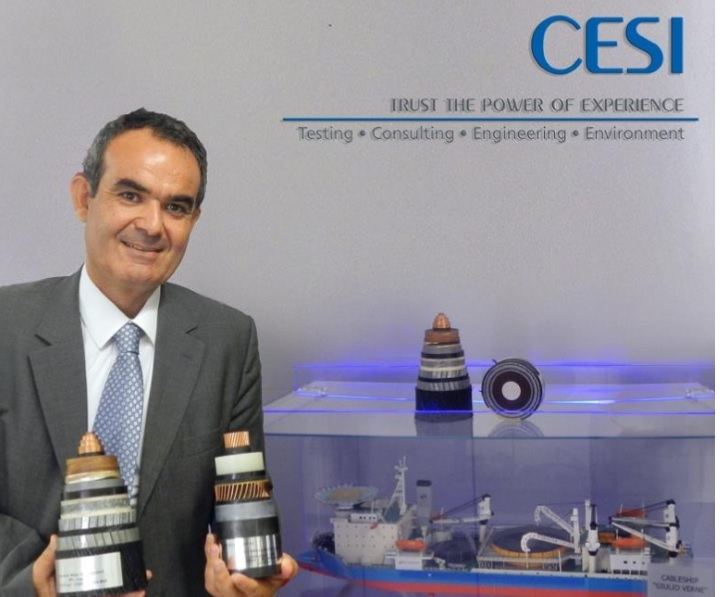
EuroAsia Interconnector project director George Killas in CESI with examples of HVDC cables

Pairs of cables will connect all converter stations. A converter station converts direct current (DC) to and from alternating current (AC). It can both send and receive power via the cable and to or from the grid. Converter stations are bipolar and could run bi-directionally enabling import or export of electricity depending on demand. Cables will run along bottom of the sea and on land will run underground. Sea electrodes are used in case of cable or converter station faults. Sea electrodes are placed at seabed several kilometers from shore and they are connected to converter stations. Converter stations will be of Voltage Source Converter (VSC) type. Each converter station will be rated to 1000 MW and made of two converter bridges of 500 MW. Submarine power cables will be of the extruded type.

=== Configuration for Stage 2 ===
In stage 2 an additional 1000 MW converter station will be built in Crete and Israel and an additional 1000 MW bipole cable on the Israel-Cyprus—Greece route will be brought into service. Stage 2 will increase transfer capacity to 2000 MW.

== Project of EU Common Interest ==
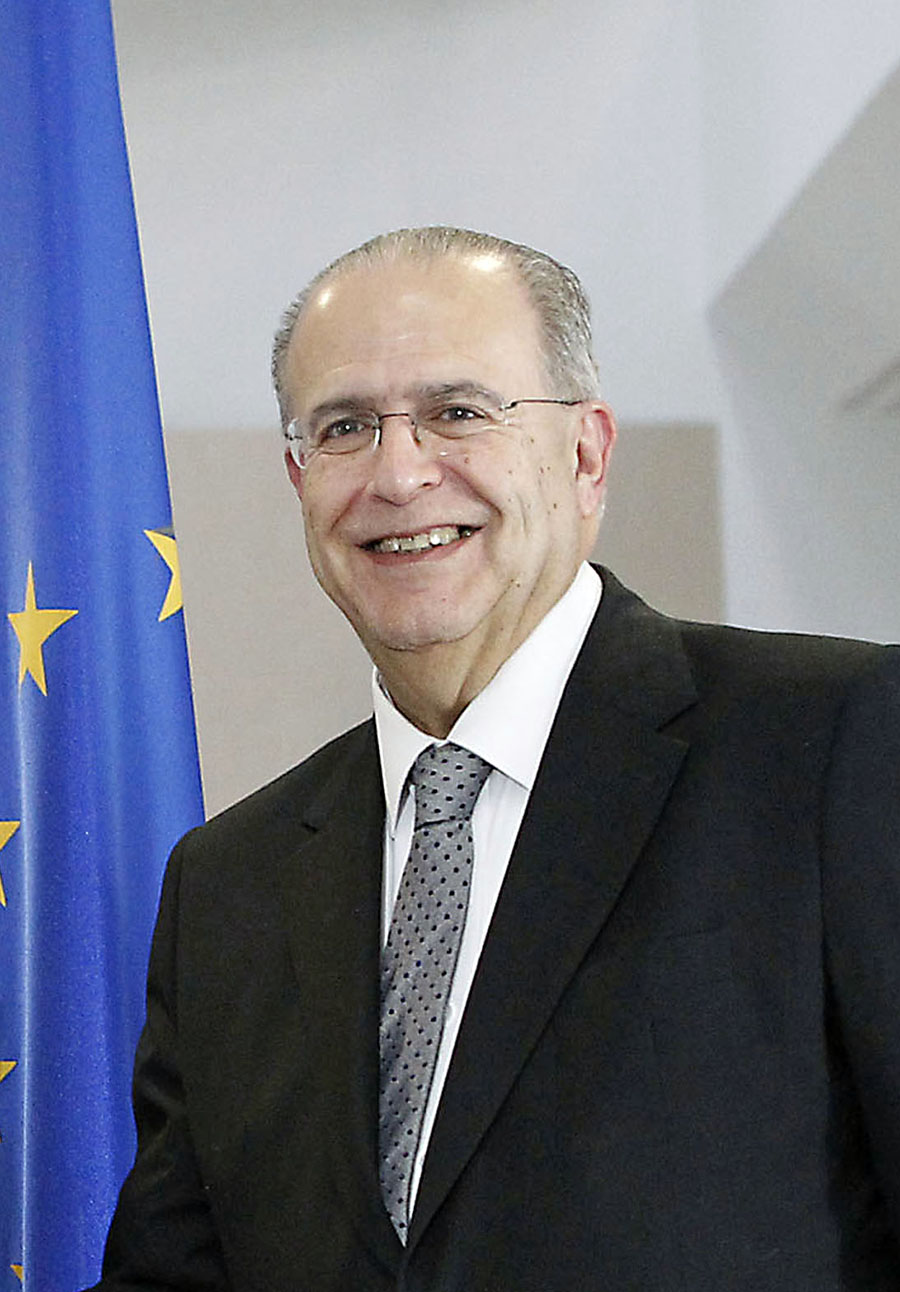
Ioannis Kasoulidis, Chairman of the Strategic Council of the EuroAsia Interconnector(2018-2021)

The European Commission adopted on 14 October 2013 under Regulation (EU) No. 1391/2013 first list of key EU Projects of Common Interest. EuroAsia Interconnector is accepted as a cluster of three EU Projects of Common Interest, important as a trans-European energy infrastructure project. Main criteria for Projects of Common Interest include market integration, security of energy supply, enhancing competition and reduction of CO_{2}. On 18 November 2015 the European Commission adopted a second revised list of 195 EU Projects of Common Interest. The EuroAsia Interconnector is included also on the revised list. On 23 November 2017, the EuroAsia Interconnecter was included on third final list of EU Projects of Common Interest. The European Commission issued the 4th PCI list on 31 October 2019, and the EuroAsia Interconnector remains as PCI 3.10.

On 29 October 2014 the EU announced funding for 3 prestudies of the Interconnector project. These studies secured half their cost (€1,325,000) from the Connecting Europe Facility. On 17 February 2017, European Commission approved €14.5 million as financial support for final detailed studies prior to Project Implementation. The EU covers half the cost of final detailed pre-works studies. The Interconnector was selected for funding as one of seven electricity projects. According to the EU Commission, the project contributes the Energy Union's goals by increasing security of energy supply, connecting European energy networks, and also contributing to integration of renewable energy sources across the EU.

=== EU Priority Electricity Highway ===
EuroAsia Interconnector has been labelled as a priority electricity corridor, and as priority Electricity Highway Project. On 23, November 2017, the EuroAsia Interconnector was on the third final list of EU Projects of Common Interest and has been labelled by the ENTSO-E as priority Electricity Highway Interconnector. The EuroAsia Interconnector was also on the fourth final list of EU Projects of Common Interest labelled as a priority Electricity Highway Interconnector.

=== Reduction of CO_{2} emissions ===
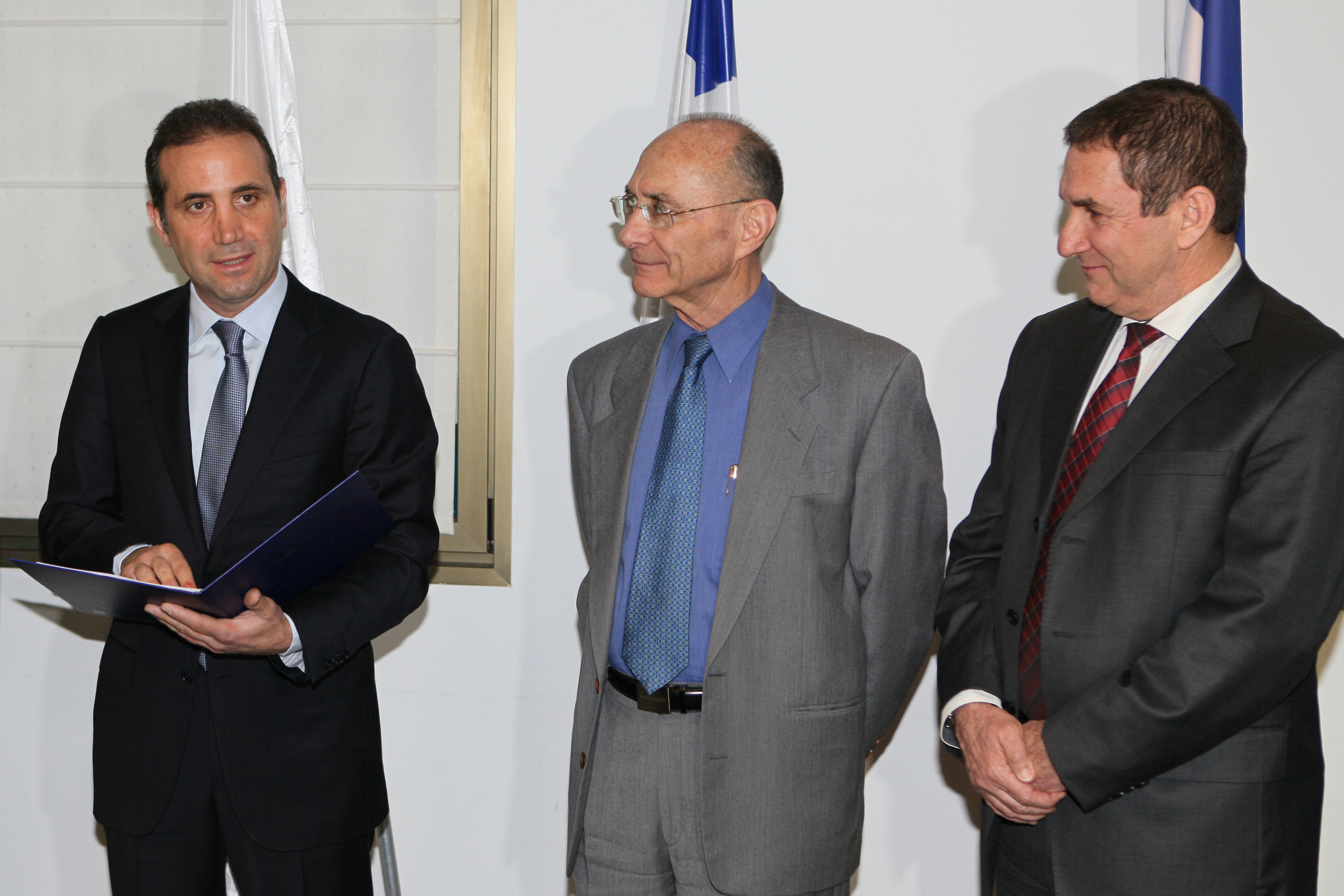
In Tel Aviv on 4 March 2012, Israeli energy minister Uzi Landau endorsed its commitment to implementing Interconnector to CEO EuroAsia Interconnector Nasos Ktorides

European Network of Transmission System Operators for Electricity (ENTSO-E) assessed positively the Interconnector project based on cost-benefit analysis methodology. It is therefore included in the ten-year network development plan 2014 (TYNDP) and also TYNDP 2016. According to the cost-benefit analysis of ENTSO-E, the Interconnector will contribute to social and economic welfare between €580m and €1.12 billion in each year. The cost-benefit analysis is done using four different visions. Reduction of CO_{2} emission is expected to be between 1.3 million tonnes and 6.8 million tonnes each year. For comparison, Cyprus had CO_{2} emissions of 6.16 million tonnes during 2015. Therefore, reduction of CO_{2} emissions will be between 21% and 110% of total Cyprus CO_{2} emissions. Based on new assessments best estimate of reduction of CO_{2} emission is expected to be 1.16 million tonnes for Stage 1.

Development of renewable energy sources on isolated systems like Cyprus could compromise the islands' electrical systems due to chaotic production fluctuations. Integration of renewable energy sources without interconnection is therefore limited. Electricity interconnection will enable and unlock integration of a high percentage of renewable sources in such isolated systems.

== History and development ==
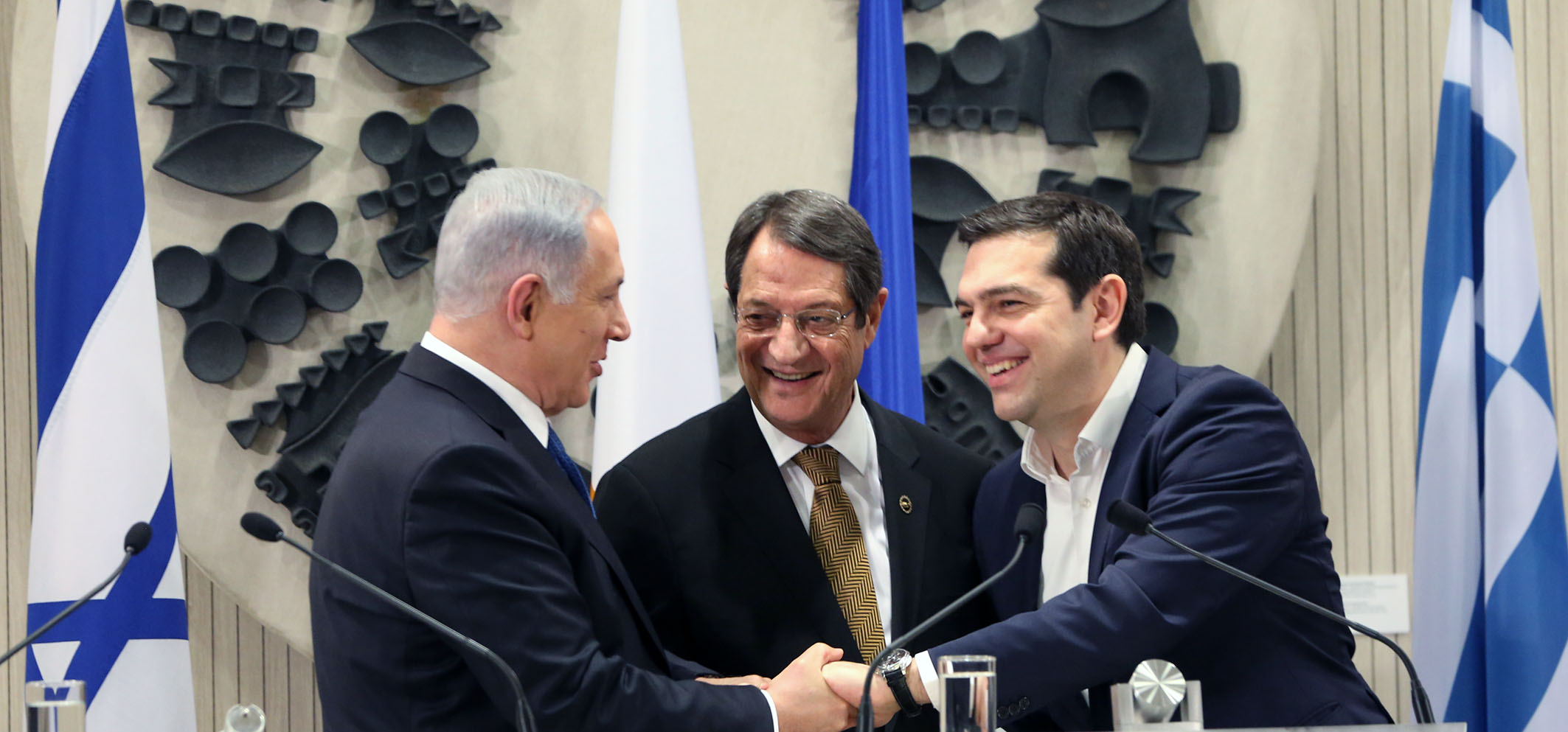
Israeli Prime Minister Benyamin Netanyahu, Cyprus President Nicos Anastasiades and Greek Prime Minister Alexis Tsipras meeting in Nicosia on 28 January 2016 affirmed their full support for the EuroAsia Interconnector

The EuroAsia Interconnector project was announced by Nasos Ktorides in Nicosia on 23 January 2012, stressing the role of Cyprus as energy bridge between Europe and Asia. A cooperation agreement for conducting the feasibility study was signed in Jerusalem on 4 March 2012 between the project operator EuroAsia Interconnector Ltd.(previously DEI Quantum Energy), and the Israel Electric Corporation in the presence of Israeli minister for Energy and Water Resources Uzi Landau and Yiftah Ron-Tal, Director of the Israel Electric Corporation. On 23 March 2012, in Nicosia, the Electricity Authority of Cyprus signed a cooperation agreement with the project operator. On 8 August 2013, the ministers of energy of Cyprus, Israel and Greece met in Cyprus. They signed the tripartite energy memorandum and reconfirmed their support for the Interconnector.

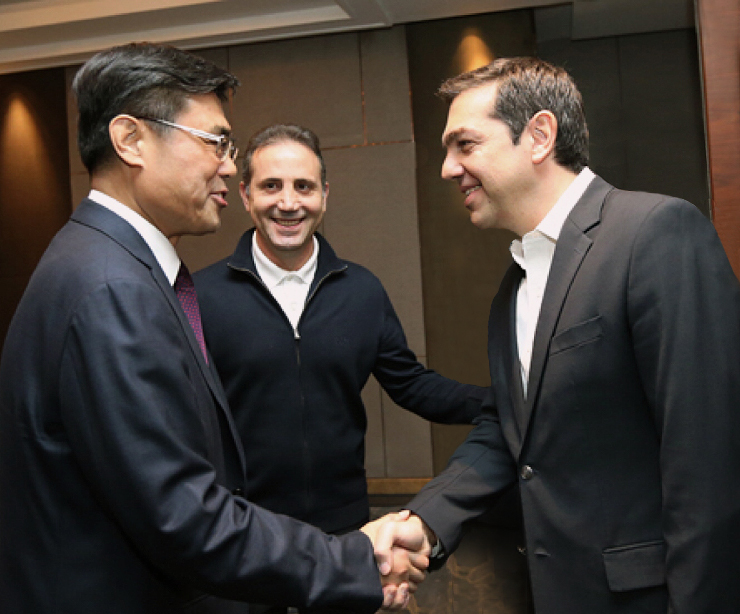
Trilateral Beijing meeting, the Greek Prime Minister Alexis Tsipras, Shu Yinbiao and Nasos Ktorides

On 14 October 2013, the Interconnector was accepted as cluster of three EU Projects of Common Interest. Later it was also accepted on the second, third and fourth lists of key EU Projects of Common Interest.

In a meeting between the Israeli and Cypriot energy ministers in June 2015, the Israeli minister suggested doubling the planned capacity of the cable. With Israel and Cyprus both having located natural gas deposits within their territories, a higher capacity cable would allow them to construct gas-driven power plants and export significant amounts of electricity to Europe.

On 11 January 2016 in Nicosia Vice-President of the European Commission Maroš Šefčovič met with President of Cyprus Nicos Anastasiades and Minister of Energy Georgios Lakkotrypis. They discussed huge potential of eastern Mediterranean for energy supply of Europe and pointed out EuroAsia Interconnector as a bridge and highway for energy supply.

Three pre-works phase studies were awarded on 18 December 2015 to the Italian companies CESI and G.A.S. S.r.l..The three studies are for the technical design, the reconnaissance study for the optimum route and an environmental impact study. In January 2016, the Italian research ship Odin Finder started a reconnaissance study for the optimum route of the underwater cable. It took about 100 days to complete the survey. All three pre-works studies were finished in 2016 and led to the next phase of the final pre-construction studies.

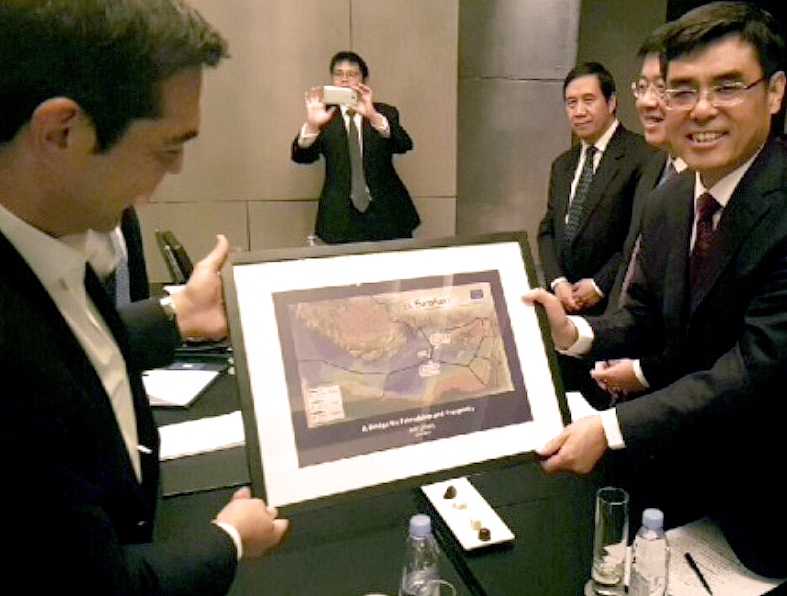
On 12 May 2017 at the Trilateral Beijing meeting the Greek Prime Minister Alexis Tsipras presents EuroAsia Interconnector

On 28 January 2016 the first Cyprus-Israel-Greece tripartite meeting took place in Nicosia. During that meeting, President of Cyprus Nicos Anastasiades, Prime Minister of Greece Alexis Tsipras and Prime Minister of Israel Benjamin Netanyahu affirmed their full support for the EuroAsia Interconnector. When they met again on 8 December 2016, in Jerusalem they reaffirmed their full support for the timely implementation of EuroAsia Interconnector.

On 17 February 2017 The European Commission approved €14.5 million as financial support for final detailed studies prior to Project Implementation. On 5 April 2017 INEA signed the grant agreement to finalize the Interconnector's design by supporting final detailed pre-works studies.

On 12 May 2017, the Greek Prime Minister Alexis Tsipras met State Grid Corporation of China Chairman Shu Yinbiao in Beijing accompanied by EuroAsia Interconnector CEO Nasos Ktorides and had discussions on jointly promoting of the Belt and Road Initiative and the strengthening of power and energy cooperation. Prime Minister Tsipras expressed his appreciation for the support Mr. Shu Yinbiao has given to the development of the Greek grid and the contribution made by State Grid Corporation of China towards the timely implementation of EuroAsia Interconnector.

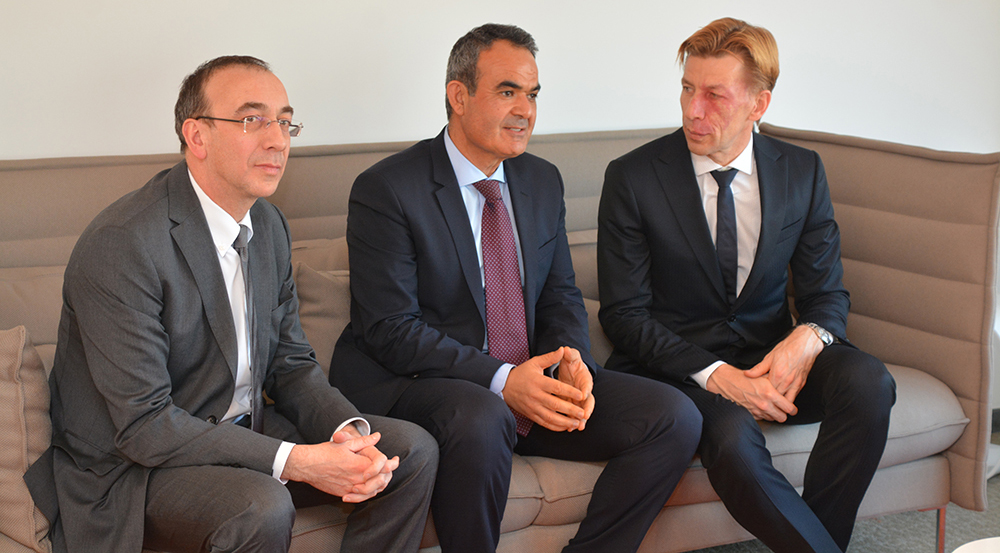
EuroAsia Interconnector Project Director George Killas (centre) with Chris Peeters, CEO of Elia Group (right) and Markus Berger, Chief Officer Infrastructure of Elia Group

At a trilateral meeting of Prime Ministers of Greece (Alexis Tsipras), Israel (Benjamin Netanyahu) and the President of Cyprus (Nicos Anastasiades) in the Greek city of Thessaloniki on 15 June 2017, the leaders pointed out that EuroAsia Interconnector is strategically important for Greece and upgrades Greece's status into a regional electricity and telecom hub.

The EuroAsia Interconnector cross-border cost allocation was approved by the Energy Regulatory Authorities of Cyprus and Greece on 10 October 2017 and 21 March 2018. It is a historic decision for Cyprus, which will lead to the end of electricity isolation for the last electrically isolated EU member state.

Elia, Belgium's electricity transmission system operator, announced on 12 December 2017 that it had concluded a strategic alliance agreement with EuroAsia Interconnector for the development and implementation of the 2,000 MW subsea electricity interconnector.

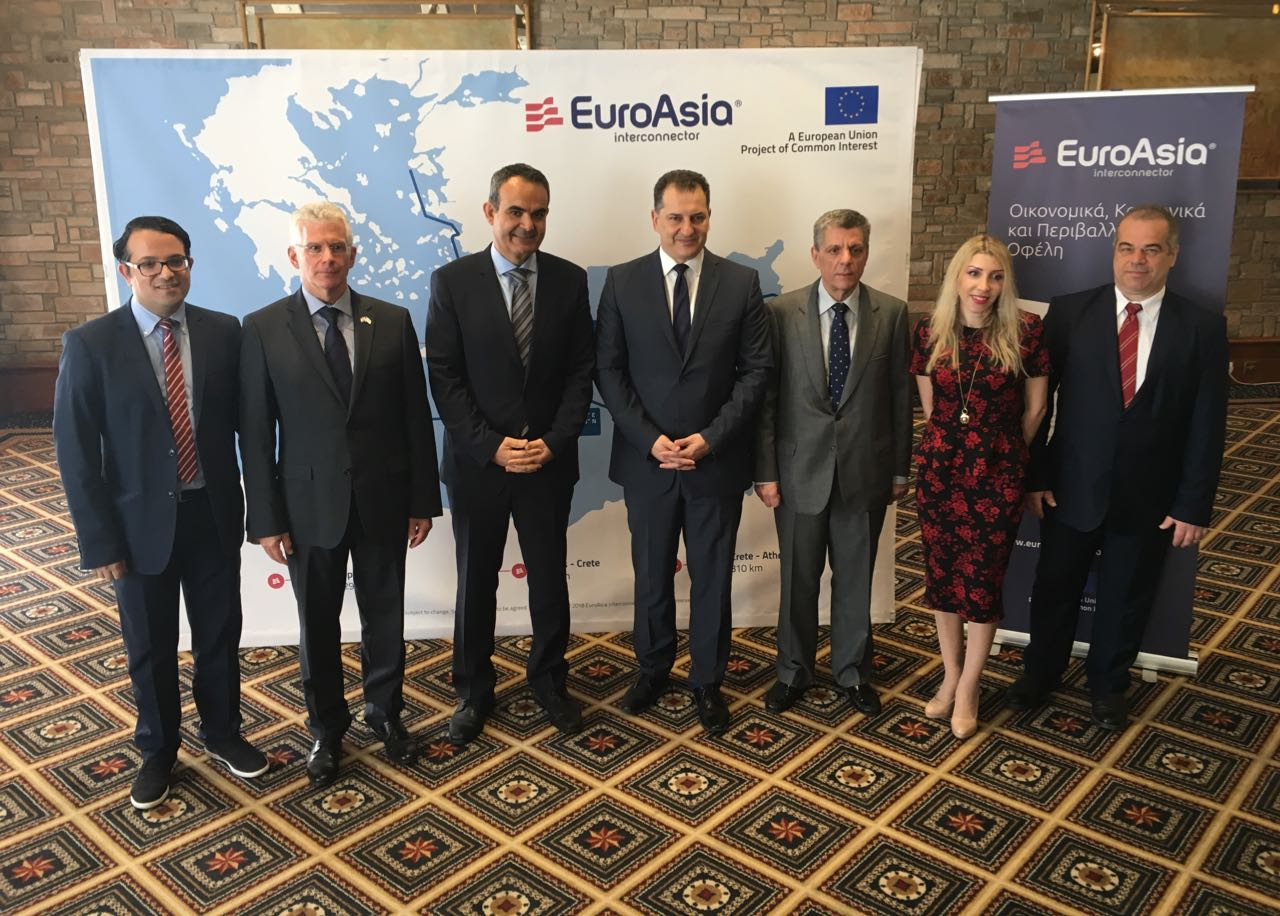
Public consultation held at the Hilton Cyprus on 2 April 2018. From left: Michalis Chrysafis from Cyprus Ministry of Energy; Shmuel (Sammy) Revel, Ambassador of Israel; George Killas, Project Director; Georgios Lakkotrypis, Minister of Energy; Ilias Fotopoulos, Ambassador of Greece; Thessalia Shambos, Cyprus Ambassador in Israel; Demosthenis Voivodas, Directorate of Licensing, General Secretariat of Strategic Investments of Greece

Former Cyprus Foreign Minister (1997—2003, 2013— March 2018) and head of the European Parliament Foreign Affairs Working group, Ioannis Kasoulides, joined EuroAsia Interconnector on 30 March 2018 as Chairman of the Strategic Council. On 11 September 2018, Dr. Kasoulides received the highest decoration awarded by France – Officer of the Order of the Legion of Honour.

In a speech at the public consultation held at the Hilton Cyprus on 2 April 2018, Cyprus Energy Minister Georgios Lakkotrypis described the project as "of particular national geopolitical importance, as it enables Cyprus and Greece to act as bridges of cooperation, linking the eastern Mediterranean with the European Union."

On 8 May 2018, the fourth Cyprus-Israel-Greece tripartite meeting took place in Nicosia. Prime Ministers of Greece Alexis Tsipras, Israel Benjamin Netanyahu and the President of Cyprus Nicos Anastasiades reconfirmed their support to the timely implementation of the EuroAsia Interconnector.

IPTO and EuroAsia Interconnector had a disagreement on the control of the link connecting Attica and Crete. On 12 July 2018, IPTO and the EuroAsia Interconnector consortium failed to come to an agreement. Prior to the disagreement, IPTO insisted on the creation of a special moving vehicle where IPTO would have a majority stake. Following this disagreement IPTO created a subsidiary with name Ariadne Interconnector responsible for the development of the Greek link to Crete.

The procurement stage of the project started on 13 February 2018 by notice for construction of Stage 1 with an estimated budget of €3.5 billion, published in the Official Journal of the European Union. A call for four tenders with estimated budget €3.27 billion was published on 17 April 2018 in the Official Journal of the European Union.

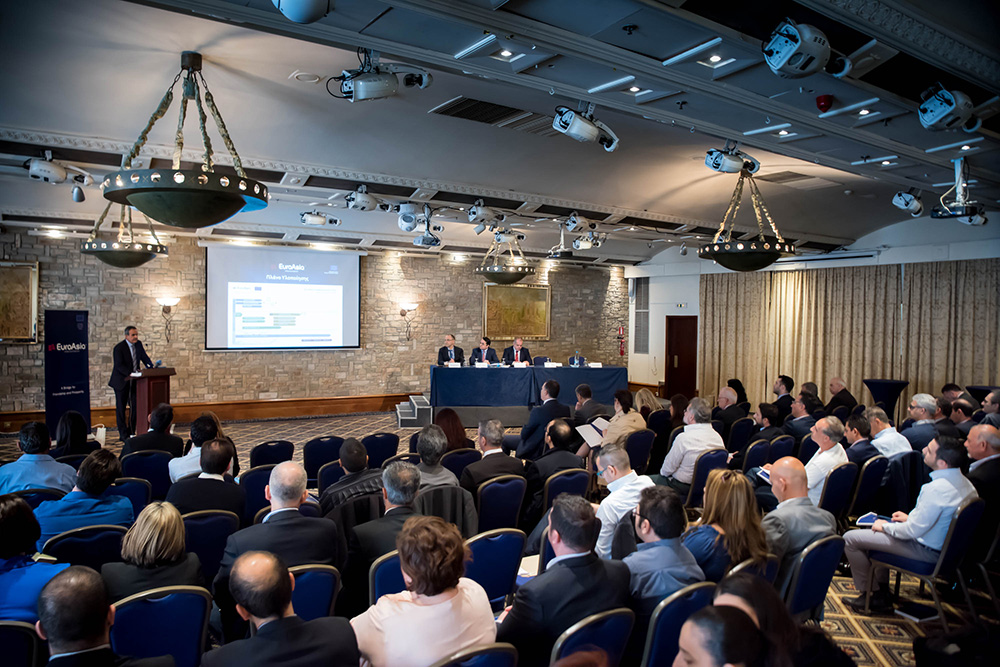
Signing ceremony for EuroAsia converter land lease

After a series of individual meetings with all successful converter station and cable manufacturers, EuroAsia Interconnector Ltd, as project promoter, issued tender documents for contracts worth €3.5bn for the design and construction of the EuroAsia Interconnector.

A meeting between the European Commission and Cyprus authorities took place on 27 February 2019, in Nicosia. In a joint communique they again expressed full support for the timely implementation of the EuroAsia Interconnector as a Project of Common Interest and they recognised EuroAsia Interconnector as the official project promoter.

On 6 June 2019, Georgios Lakkotrypis, the Minister of Energy, signed on behalf of the Cyprus government a 33-year land concession agreement for construction of HVDC converter station.

On 3 July 2019, EuroAsia Interconnector Ltd, project promoter, announced the final stage of tenders for construction of the EuroAsia Interconnector.

On 11 October 2019 Minister of Environment and Energy Kostis Hatzidakis, on behalf of the Government of Greece and the Prime Minister, said that Greece provides strong political support to the work of Cyprus's electrical interconnection with Greece and Israel as PCI projects, in order to lift Cyprus's electrical isolation and link the island to the European Union's electricity grids.

The Republic of Cyprus in July 2020 issued its final building permit for the construction of the HVDC converter station in Cyprus.

On 8 March 2021 Cyprus, Greece and Israel signed an initial agreement to build the world's largest and deepest submarine power cable that will connect the three Mediterranean countries' power grids, to be completed by 2024.

President of the European Commission Ursula von der Leyen visited Cyprus on 8 July 2021 and officially presented EU approval for Cyprus plan to spend €1.2 billion under the EU Recovery and Resilience Plan. The EuroAsia Interconnector got €100 million funding from EU Recovery and Resilience Plan.

On 26 January 2022 the European Commission approved €657 million under the Connecting Europe Facility for EuroAsia Interconnector.

The inauguration ceremony on the start of the construction works of Interconnector held on 14 October 2022 at the Presidential Palace in Nicosia. The ceremony was attended by European Commissioner for Energy and Housing Kadri Simson, President of Cyprus Nicos Anastasiades, Greek Environment and Energy Minister Kostas Skrekas, Cypriot Energy Minister Natasa Pilides and CEO of EuroAsia Interconnector Nasos Ktorides. Construction was scheduled to start in 2023 and be completed in 2027. Subsea cables for EuroAsia Interconnector to be produced by Nexans, who won a contract worth 1.43 billion euros, signed on 19 July 2023.

The project was paused by the Greek government in March 2025 after payments to French cable maker Nexans were frozen, and the Italian research ship, Ievoli Relume, returned to Italy. This was following objections by Turkey which sent five warships to the research area in July 2024 to prevent research continuing. It seemed possible that the project be cancelled due to Turkish pressure. Despite this, an undersea cable connecting the Greek mainland to Crete was completed in May 2025.

In August 2026, the project gained new momentum when French infrastructure investment group Meridiam acquired a 66% stake in Great Sea Interconnector, becoming the project's majority shareholder, while Greece's Independent Power Transmission Operator (IPTO) retained a minority stake and responsibility for its technical implementation and operation. The agreement was signed in Athens in the presence of Greek Prime Minister Kyriakos Mitsotakis, alongside a separate agreement with French cable manufacturer Nexans to advance seabed surveys between Crete and Cyprus.

In November 2026, seabed surveys began again between the Greek island of Karpathos and Cyprus.

== Benefits ==
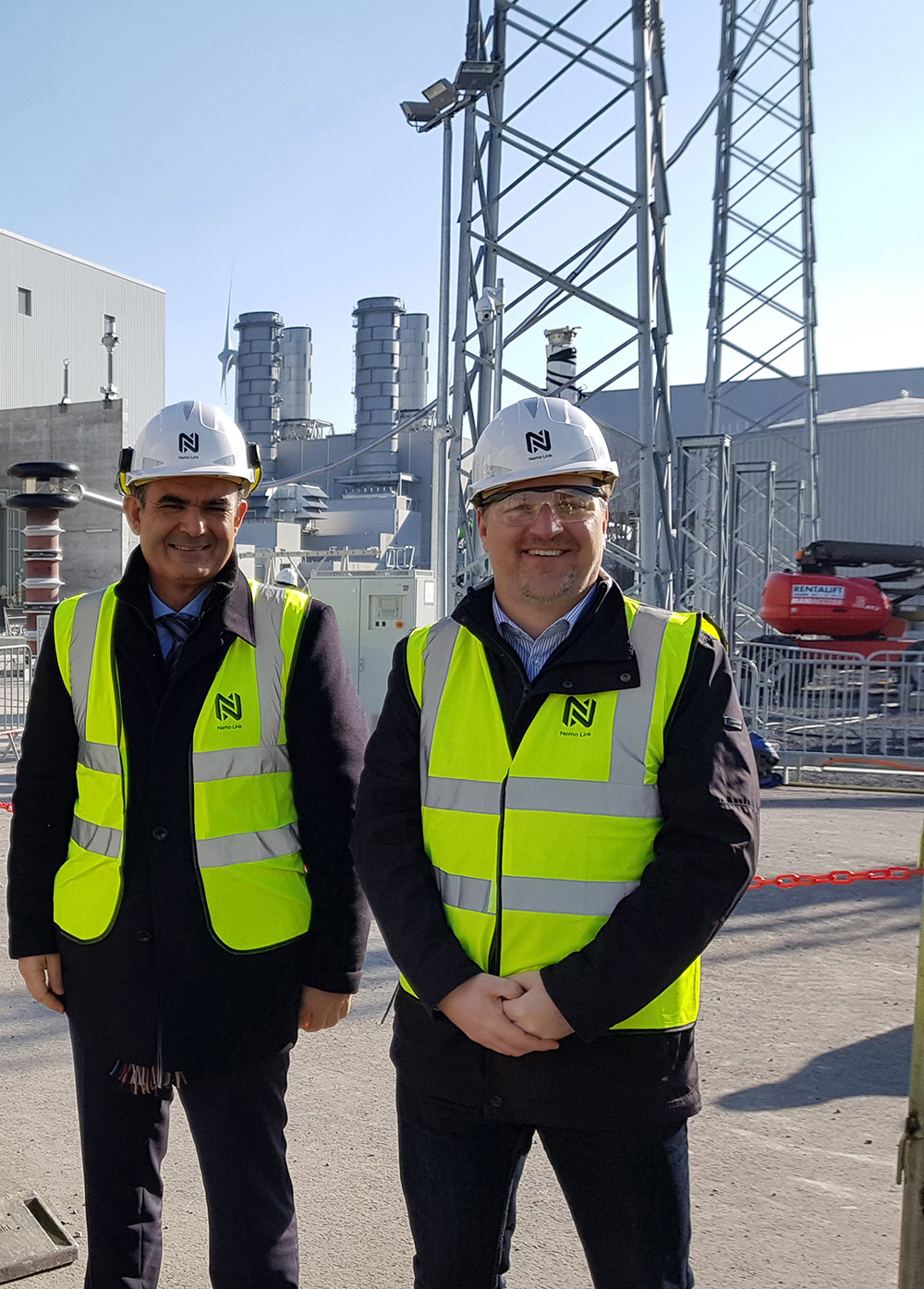
EuroAsia Interconnector Project Director George Killas (left) with Didier Wiot, Chief Officer Solutions & Services at Elia Group

- Ends energy isolation of Cyprus and connects them to the European network. Cyprus is the last member of EU isolated without energy interconnections.
- Ensures secure energy supply of Cyprus and Israel, connecting them with the European network
- Enables a path towards new markets for new East Mediterranean gas finds in the form of electricity. Also enables a path for electricity produced from renewable energy sources.
- Contributes to EU target for 10% of electricity interconnection between member states
- Promotes development of renewable energy sources and contributes to the reduction of CO_{2}
- Offers significant economic and geopolitical benefit to 3 countries. It is expected that socio-economic benefit will be around 10 billion €.

== See also ==
- EuroAfrica Interconnector
- Submarine power cable
- Elia System Operator
- Nemo link
- EastMed pipeline
