= Mao Weiming =

Chinese politician

- 毛伟明

Governor of Hunan
- In office 27 November 2020 – 30 October 2026
- Party Secretary: Shen Xiaoming
- Preceded by: Xu Dazhe
- Succeeded by: Xie Weijiang (acting)

Chairman of the State Grid Corporation of China
- In office January 2020 – November 2020
- Preceded by: Kou Wei
- Succeeded by: Xin Bao'an

Executive Vice Governor of Jiangxi
- In office September 2015 – January 2020
- Governor: Liu Qi; Yi Lianhong
- Preceded by: Mo Jiancheng
- Succeeded by: Yin Meigen

Personal details
- Born: May 1961 (age 65) Quzhou, Zhejiang, China
- Party: Chinese Communist Party
- Education: Zhejiang University

Chinese name
- Simplified Chinese: 毛伟明
- Traditional Chinese: 毛偉明
Transcriptions
Standard Mandarin
- Hanyu Pinyin: Máo Wěimíng

Mao Weiming (Chinese: 毛伟明, born May 1961) is a Chinese politician. He was served as the governor of Hunan from November 2020 to October 2026.

Mao was a delegate to the 11th, 12th and 13th National People's Congress. He was an alternate of the 19th Central Committee of the Chinese Communist Party and is a member of the 20th Central Committee of the Chinese Communist Party.

== Biography ==
Mao was born in Quzhou, Zhejiang. He graduated from Zhejiang University in 1982, majoring chemical engineering. In September 1985, he joined the Chinese Communist Party (CCP). He had been served as the Secretary-General of Jiangsu (2013), the Deputy Minister of Industry and Information Technology (2013–2015), the Executive Deputy Governor of Jiangxi (2015–January 2020), and Chairman of the State Grid Corporation of China (January–November 2020).

In November 2020, Mao was named the Deputy Party Secretary and acting Governor of Hunan. On 24 October 2026, he stopped serving as the Deputy Secretary of the CCP Hunan Provincial Committee and Secretary of the Party Group of the Hunan Provincial Government. On 30 October 2026, he resigned from his position as Governor of Hunan. On 6 November 2026, he was appointed as the vice chairman of the National People's Congress Financial and Economic Affairs Committee at the 25th meeting of the Standing Committee of the 14th National People's Congress.

Government offices
| Preceded by Song Chengyu (宋诚宇) | Mayor of Wujin; 1998–2001 | Succeeded by Li Xiaoping (李小平) |
| Preceded by Xia Ming (夏鸣) | Mayor of Taizhou; 2003–2006 | Succeeded by Yao Jianhua |
| Preceded by Qian Zhixin | Director of Jiangsu Provincial Development and Reform Commission; 2006–2011 | Succeeded by Chen Zhenning |
| Preceded by Fan Jinlong | Secretary-General of Jiangsu Provincial People's Government; 2011–2013 | Succeeded by Zhang Jinghua |
| Preceded by Mo Jiancheng | Executive Vice Governor of Jiangxi; 2015–2020 | Succeeded by Yin Meigen |
| Preceded by Xu Dazhe | Governor of Hunan; 2020–2026 | Succeeded by Xie Weijiang |
Party political offices
| Preceded by Song Chengyu (宋诚宇) | Communist Party Secretary of Wujin; 2001 | Succeeded by Sheng Keqin (盛克勤) |
Business positions
| Preceded by Kou Wei | Chairman of the State Grid Corporation of China; 2020 | Succeeded by Xin Bao'an |
