= Xin Bao'an =

Chairman of the State Grid Corporation of China from 2021 to 2024

- 辛保安
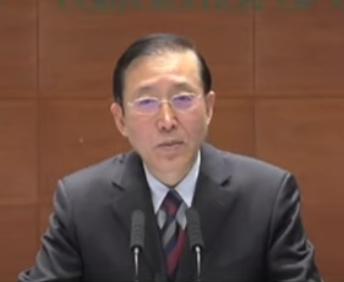
- Xin Bao'an at 2021 World Economic Forum

Chairman of the State Grid Corporation of China
- In office January 2021 – 27 March 2024
- Preceded by: Mao Weiming
- Succeeded by: Zhang Zhigang

General Manager of the State Grid Corporation of China
- In office December 2018 – January 2021
- Preceded by: Kou Wei
- Succeeded by: Zhang Zhigang

Personal details
- Born: October 1960 (age 65) Huixian, Henan, China
- Party: Chinese Communist Party
- Education: Xi'an Jiaotong University; North China Electric Power University

Xin Bao'an (Chinese: 辛保安; pinyin: Xīn Bǎo'ān; born October 1960) is a Chinese engineer and executive who served as chairman of the State Grid Corporation of China from 2021 to 2024.

Xin is a representative of the 20th National Congress of the Chinese Communist Party. He is a member of the 14th National Committee of the Chinese People's Political Consultative Conference.

== Career ==
Born in October 1960 in Huixian, Henan, Xin graduated from Xi'an Jiaotong University and North China Electric Power University.

Xin was appointed deputy general manager of the China Huadian Corporation in August 2005, serving in the post for more than 11 years. In November 2016, he became deputy general manager of the State Grid Corporation of China, rising to general manager in December 2018. In January 2021, he rose to become chairman of the State Grid Corporation of China, and held that office until March 2024, when he was succeeded by Zhang Zhigang.

== Investigation ==
On 31 July 2026, Xin was suspected of "serious violations of laws and regulations" by the Central Commission for Discipline Inspection (CCDI), the party's internal disciplinary body, and the National Supervisory Commission, the highest anti-corruption agency of China.

== Publication ==
- 新型电力系统与新型能源体系 [New Power Systems and New Energy Systems] (in Chinese). Beijing: China Electric Power Press. 2023. ISBN 9787519881047.

Business positions
Preceded by Kou Wei	General Manager of the State Grid Corporation of China; 2018–2021	Succeeded by Zhang Zhigang
Preceded by Mao Weiming	Chairman of the State Grid Corporation of China; 2021–2024	Succeeded by Zhang Zhigang
