= Hemo =

Hemo or HEMO may refer to:

- Hemo the Magnificent, 1957 educational television film
- Hellenic Electricity Market Operator, Greek energy overseer
- HEMO protein A HERV-originated protein
