= Yingda Asset Management =

Yingda Asset Management is a Chinese asset management company founded on 18 July 2012. It was owned by the Central Government of China via subsidiaries of state-owned enterprises.

The company managed some investment funds that open to retail investors to subscribe.

== Subsidiaries ==
- Yingda Capital Management (100%)

== Shareholders ==
- Yingda International Trust (49%)
- China Communications Construction (36%)
- China Aerospace Science & Industry Finance (15%)
