= Yin Meigen =

Chinese politician

- 殷美根

Vice Chairman of Jiangxi Provincial People's Congress
- In office January 2023 – March 2023
- Chairman: Yin Hong

Executive Vice Governor of Jiangxi Provincial People's Government
- In office March 2020 – December 2021
- Governor: Yi Lianhong
- Preceded by: Mao Weiming
- Succeeded by: Liang Gui

Personal details
- Born: August 1963 (age 63) Nanchang, Jiangxi, China
- Party: Chinese Communist Party (1985–2023; expelled)
- Education: Nanchang University; Zhongnan University of Economics and Law; Central Party School of the Chinese Communist Party

Yin Meigen (Chinese: 殷美根; pinyin: Yīn Měigēn; born August 1963) is a former Chinese politician who was executive vice governor of Jiangxi Provincial People's Government from 2020 to 2021 and vice chairman of Jiangxi Provincial People's Congress in 2023. He was investigated by China's top anti-graft agency in March 2023.

He was a representative of the 19th National Congress of the Chinese Communist Party. He was a delegate to the 12th National People's Congress.

== Early life and education ==
Yin was born in Nanchang, Jiangxi, in August 1963. In 1981, he entered Jiangxi University of Technology (now Nanchang University), where he majored in power system and its automation. Upon graduation, in May 1985, he joined the Chinese Communist Party (CCP).

== Career ==
After graduating in 1985, Yin was despatched to Jiangxi Provincial Economic and Trade Commission, where he eventually became deputy director in December 2001.

Yin was made executive vice mayor of Jiujiang in May 2008. In August 2011, he was named acting mayor, confirmed in the following month. He rose to become party secretary, the top political position in the city, in September 2013.

He was promoted to vice governor of Jiangxi in November 2015. In November 2016, was appointed party secretary of the capital city Nanchang and was admitted to member of the CCP Jiangxi Provincial Committee, the province's top authority. In March 2020, he was promoted again to become executive vice governor. He also served as secretary of the Party Working Committee of Ganjiang New Area from October 2020 to June 2022.

In January 2023, he was chosen as vice chairman of Jiangxi Provincial People's Congress.

== Downfall ==
On 29 March 2023, Yin was put under investigation for alleged "serious violations of discipline and laws" by the Central Commission for Discipline Inspection (CCDI), the party's internal disciplinary body, and the National Supervisory Commission, the highest anti-corruption agency of China. On October 7, he was expelled from the CCP and removed from public office. On October 11, he was detained by the Supreme People's Procuratorate.

On 29 January 2024, Yin was indicted on suspicion of accepting bribes. On October 25, he stood trial at the Intermediate People's Court of Sanming on charges of taking bribes, he used his various positions between 2003 and 2023 in Jiangxi to seek profits for various companies and individuals in engineering contracting, enterprise management, and job promotion, and in return, he illegally accepted money and goods worth over 207 million yuan ($28.84 million) directly or through his relatives.

On 15 April 2025, Yin was sentenced to death with a two-year reprieve for bribery, he was deprived of political rights for life and all his properties were also confiscated.

Party political offices
Preceded by Zeng Qinghong	Mayor of Jiujiang; 2011–2013	Succeeded by Zhong Zhisheng
Preceded by Mao Weiming	Executive Vice Governor of Jiangxi Provincial People's Government; 2020–2021	Succeeded by Liang Gui
Government offices
Preceded by Zhong Ligui	Communist Party Secretary of Jiujiang; 2013–2015	Succeeded by Yang Weidong
Preceded by Gong Jianhua	Communist Party Secretary of Nanchang; 2016–2020	Succeeded by Wu Xiaojun
