= Yingda International Trust =

Chinese asset management and trust company

- Formerly: Jinan International Trust and Investment Corporation
- Company type: state-owned limited company
- Industry: Financial services
- Founded: March 1987
- Headquarters: Beijing, China
- Area served: mainland China
- Services: trust; asset management
- Revenue: ▲CN¥1.204 billion (2015)
- Operating income: ▲CN¥0.903 billion (2015)
- Net income: ▲CN¥0.683 billion (2015)
- Total assets: ▲CN¥5.251 billion (2015)
- Total equity: ▲CN¥4.996 billion (2015)
- Owner: State Grid (93.60%); Jinan Energy Investment (4.38%); Jigang Group (1.10%); Luneng Property (0.92%)
- Number of employees: ▲150 (December 2015)
- Subsidiaries: Yingda Asset Management (49%)
- Website: yditc.com.cn
- Footnotes / references in a consolidated basis

Yingda International Trust Co., Ltd.
- Simplified Chinese: 英大国际信托有限责任公司
- Traditional Chinese: 英大國際信託有限責任公司
Transcriptions

Yingda Trust
- Simplified Chinese: 英大信托
- Traditional Chinese: 英大信託
Transcriptions

Yingda International Trust Co., Ltd. is a Chinese trust company and asset management firm that was majority owned by State Grid Corporation of China (via State Grid Yingda Group for 89.76% stake). Yingda Trust was founded in March 1987, as Jinan International Trust and Investment Corporation. Yingda Trust owned Yingda Asset Management for 49% stake. The company was headquartered in Jinan, but in 2010 moved to Beijing.

== Shareholders ==
As of 31 December 2015

- State Grid Corporation of China (via State Grid Yingda Group and its subsidiary, via State Grid Shanghai): 93.60%
- Jinan Development and Reform Commission (via indirect subsidiary Jinan Energy Investment): 4.38%
- Jigang Group: 1.10%
- (Chinese: 山东鲁能物业公司; lit. 'Shandong Luneng Property'): 0.92%

The share capital of Yingda International Trust had increase from CN¥1.5 billion to approximately CN¥1.82 billion in 2012, which was entirely subscribed by State Grid Yingda Group. Yingda Group also acquired 4.67% stake from sister company East China Grid on 27 March 2012 and from Jinan 3F (Chinese: 济南三爱富氟化工) in 2013.

== See also ==
- Shandong International Trust
