= Zhang Zhigang =

Chinese engineer and executive

- 张智刚

Chairman of the State Grid Corporation of China
- Incumbent
- Assumed office 27 March 2024
- Preceded by: Xin Bao'an

General Manager of the State Grid Corporation of China
- In office May 2021 – March 2024
- Preceded by: Xin Bao'an

Personal details
- Born: November 1964 (age 61) China
- Party: Chinese Communist Party
- Education: Tsinghua University
- Occupation: Executive, engineer

Chinese name
- Simplified Chinese: 张智刚
- Traditional Chinese: 張智剛
Transcriptions
Standard Mandarin
- Hanyu Pinyin: Zhāng Zhìgāng

Zhang Zhigang (Chinese: 张智刚; born November 1964) is a Chinese electrical engineer and executive who is the current chairman of the State Grid Corporation of China, in office since March 2024.

Zhang is an alternate of the 20th Central Committee of the Chinese Communist Party.

== Biography ==
Zhang was born in November 1964, and graduated from Tsinghua University. He entered the workforce in July 1987. He served as deputy general manager of the State Grid Corporation of China in September 2017, and in May 2021 was promoted to the general manager position. On 27 March 2024, he rose to become chairman of the State Grid Corporation of China, succeeding Xin Bao'an.

Party political offices
Preceded by Xin Bao'an	General Manager of the State Grid Corporation of China; 2021–2024	Succeeded by TBA
Preceded by Xin Bao'an	Chairman of the State Grid Corporation of China; 2024–present	Incumbent
