= Natasa Pilides =

Cypriot politician (born 1980)

- Νατάσα Πηλείδου
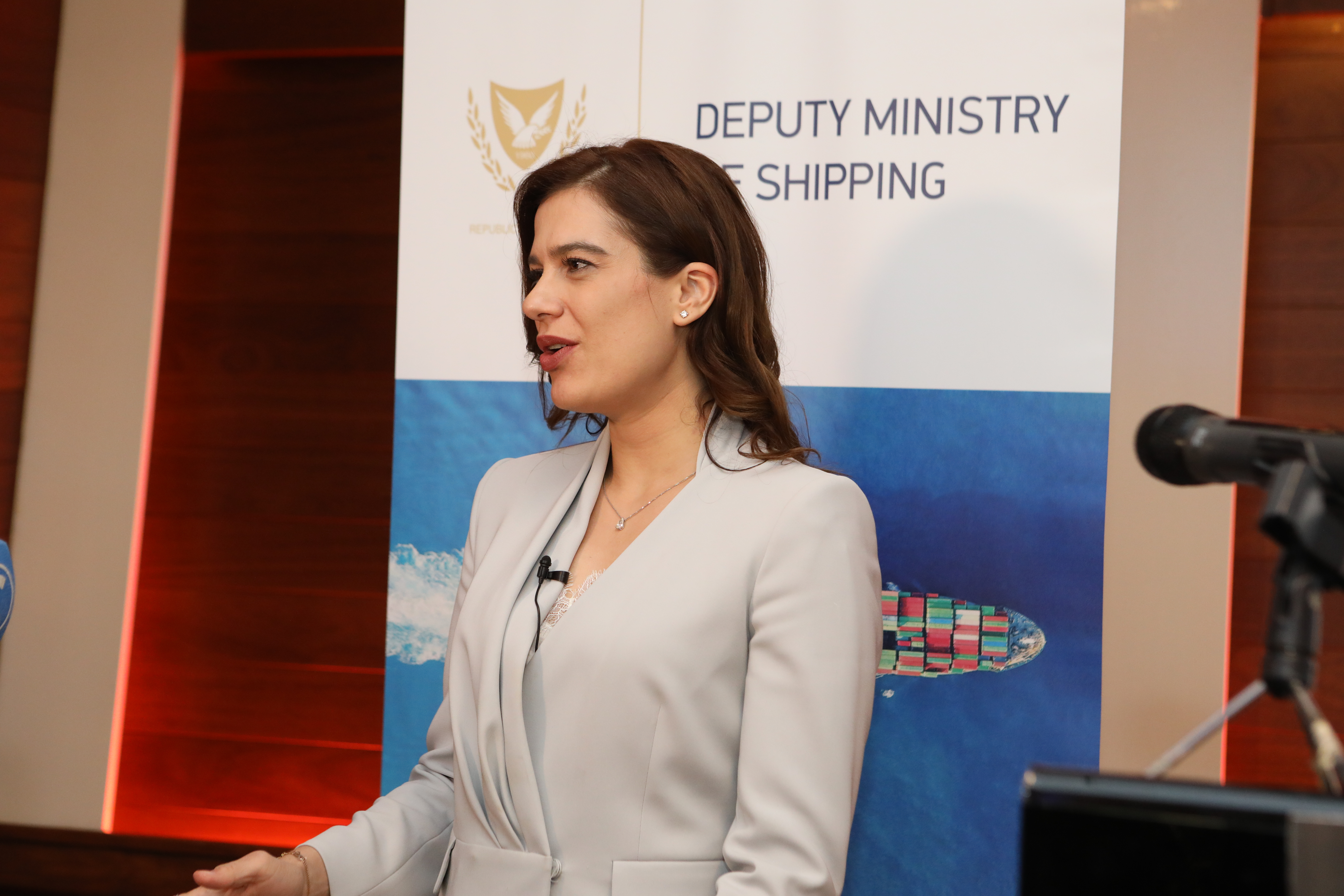
- Pilides in 2018

Minister of Energy, Commerce and Industry of the Republic of Cyprus
- In office 10 July 2020 – 1 March 2023
- President: Nicos Anastasiades
- Preceded by: Giorgios Lakkotrypis
- Succeeded by: George Papanastasiou

Deputy Minister of Shipping of the Republic of Cyprus
- In office 1 March 2018 – 9 July 2020
- President: Nicos Anastasiades
- Preceded by: N/A
- Succeeded by: Vassilis Demtriades

Personal details
- Born: 18 December 1980 (age 45) Nicosia, Cyprus
- Education: University of Oxford
- Occupation: Politician, accountant, businesswoman

Natasa Pilides (Greek: Νατάσα Πηλείδου; born 18 December 1980) is a Cypriot politician, accountant, and businesswoman. She served as the Minister of Energy, Commerce and Industry of Cyprus from July 2020 to March 2023. She also served as the Deputy Minister of Shipping, and as Director General of Invest Cyprus.

== Early life and education ==
Pilides graduated from the University of Oxford with an honours degree in Modern Languages and Literature (French and Italian). She is a Fellow the Institute of Chartered Accountants of England and Wales (ICAEW) and a member of the Certified Public Accountants of Cyprus (ICPAC).

== Career ==
Pilides served as Director General of Invest Cyprus from April 2016 to March 2018. On 1 March 2018, she was appointed the first Deputy Minister of Shipping of the Republic of Cyprus.

On 10 July 2020, she was appointed Minister of Energy, Commerce and Industry, succeeding Giorgos Lakkotrypis, who had served in the role for seven years. She remained in office until 1 March 2023, when she was succeeded by Georgia Papanastasiou following the 2023 presidential election.

In November 2024, Pilides was appointed to the board of directors of AstroBank. In March 2025, she was named chief executive officer of Med Energywise Ltd., a subsidiary of Petrolina (Holdings) Public Limited.
