= Kou Wei =

- 寇伟
- Born: October 1961 (age 65); Jianchuan County, Yunnan, China
- Education: Kunming University of Science and Technology; Huazhong University of Science and Technology
- Occupations: Executive, politician
- Agents: State Grid Corporation of China (2016–2020); China Datang Corporation (2020–2021)
- Political party: Chinese Communist Party (expelled in 2025)

Chinese name
- Simplified Chinese: 寇伟
- Traditional Chinese: 寇偉
Transcriptions
Standard Mandarin
- Hanyu Pinyin: Kòu Wěi

Kou Wei (Chinese: 寇伟; born October 1961) is a Chinese executive and politician of Bai ethnicity who served as chairman of the State Grid Corporation of China from December 2018 to January 2020 and chairman of China Datang Corporation from 2020 to 2021.

He was an alternate of the 19th Central Committee of the Chinese Communist Party.

== Biography ==
Kou was born in Jianchuan County, Yunnan, in October 1961, and graduated from Yunnan Institute of Technology (now Kunming University of Science and Technology) and Huazhong University of Science and Technology.

He successively worked at Yangzonghai Power Plant, Yunnan Electric Power Industry Bureau, Yunnan Manwan Power Plant, Yunnan Electric Power Industry Bureau, Yunnan Electric Power Group Co., Ltd., Yunnan Lancang River Hydropower Development Co., Ltd., Huaneng Lancang River Hydropower Co., Ltd., and China Huaneng. He was general manager of the State Grid Corporation of China in July 2016, and subsequently chairman in December 2018. He was general manager of China Datang Corporation in January 2020, and soon after rose to become chairman, and served until his resignation in June 2021.

== Downfall ==
On 21 December 2024, Kou was put under investigation for alleged "serious violations of discipline and laws" by the Central Commission for Discipline Inspection (CCDI), the party's internal disciplinary body, and the National Supervisory Commission, the highest anti-corruption agency of China. He was expelled from the Chinese Communist Party on 6 June 2025.

On 1 April 2026, Kou was sentenced to death sentence with reprieve.
