= Cyprus Investment Promotion Agency =

Cyprus Investment Promotion Agency (CIPA)
Investment agency overview
- Jurisdiction: Government of Cyprus
- Headquarters: Nicosia, Cyprus
- Investment agency executive: Christodoulos E. Angastiniotis, Chairman
- Website: www.investcyprus.org.cy

The Cyprus Investment Promotion Agency (CIPA) is the national investment promotion agency of Cyprus with the mandate to enhance the nation's investment appeal abroad.

== Scope ==
In 2017, the real estate, shipping and tourism industries are the priority sectors in CIPA's action plan for investment promotion, but there is increasing focus on developing a nascent energy sector.
