= LAGIE =

Hellenic Electricity Market Operator S.A. (HEMO or LAGIE from "ΛΑΓΗΕ"- Λειτουργός ΑΓοράς Ηλεκτρικής Ενέργειας A.E. in Greek) is responsible for the operation and settlement of the energy market in Greece as well as daily energy scheduling.

From the end of 2000 until the January 31, 2012, LAGIE was a joint company with ADMIE who were in charge of the operation and maintenance of the transmission system (excluding the directors that belonged to Public Power Corporation of Greece (PPC S.A.), under the name "HELLENIC TRANSMISSION SYSTEM OPERATOR S.A." (HTSO or DESMIE from "ΔΕΣΜΗΕ" - Διαχειριστής Ελληνικού Συστήματος Μεταφοράς Ηλεκτρικής Ενέργειας Α.Ε. in Greek).

LAGIE S.A. is a full member of the EuroPEX association.

== See also ==
- Energy in Greece
