= Centro Elettrotecnico Sperimentale Italiano =

Italian testing and certification company

CESI SpA
- Type: Joint stock company
- Founded: 1956
- Founder: Ercole Bottani
- Headquarters: Milan, Italy
- Key people: Guido Bortoni (Chairman), Nicola Melchiotti (CEO)
- Revenue: €195 million (2024)
- Number of employees: 1,000 (2024)
- Website: https://www.cesi.it/

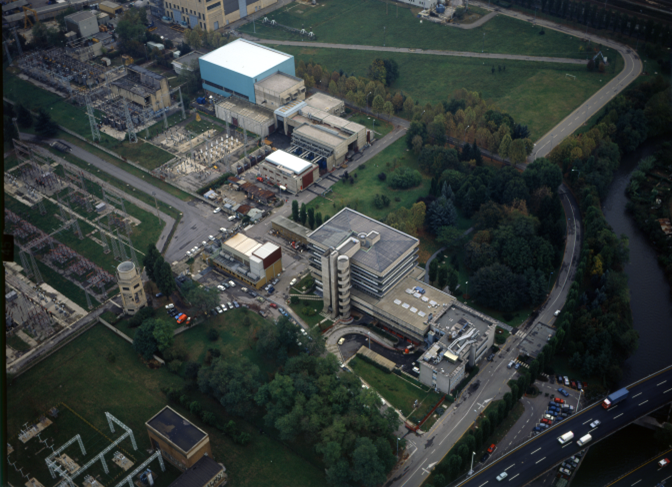
CESI Aerial view Milan Headquarters

CESI (Centro Elettrotecnico Sperimentale Italiano "Giacinto Motta") is a company that provides testing and certification services, energy consultancy, engineering and technology consulting for the electricity sector worldwide. CESI is headquartered in Milan, Italy and was founded in 1956. It currently has offices and laboratories in five continents and over 70 countries.

== History ==
CESI was founded in 1956. The strong necessity of doing experimental tests and network studies persuaded the big electromechanical industries (Pirelli, SAE, Ercole Marelli, Ansaldo), together with the majority of electrical industries (Edison, SADE, Montecatini, Falck), of the need of a “Great Power laboratory”. In the early 50s, the “X Laboratory” was born. At the end of the 50s, CESI is developed a leadership in the determination of short-circuit powers inside the transmission lines and in load flows’ problems. In the 1958, its international aim is attested thanks to an important commission: the study of the system El Chocón Dam – Buenos Aires for the construction of two hydroelectric plants.

The problems of the unification of electrical frequencies and of the interconnection networks, enabling energy interchange between an “island” and another and consequently achieve Italian electrical system unity, lead to the establishment in 1962 of ENEL. In the 1964, ENEL decided to use CESI's laboratories to make targeted studies for its operative activity. The company purchased the majority of the capital of CESI. CESI, under the boost of the increase in electricity consumption, built new laboratories, also for high voltage cable tests. This gave birth to the “1000 kV’s Project”, which was realized for the transport of energy and high voltage on the Italian electrical networks. The “1000 kV’s Project” was a key step in the history of electrical industry's research, not only in Italy but also in the world.

In 1988, CESI signed a convention with IMQ which bring to fruition the CSQ (Certified Quality Systems). At December 1989, ENEL charged CESI with a research project to be finished in three years: the Energy storage for a stationary and vehicular use. The topic was the application of the electrical battery not only on traditional power plants but especially on non traditional ones, like photovoltaic and wind power. The project faced off the development and industrialization of pioneering batteries and, at the same time, wanted to realized prototypes of electric vehicles with a highest degree of innovation.

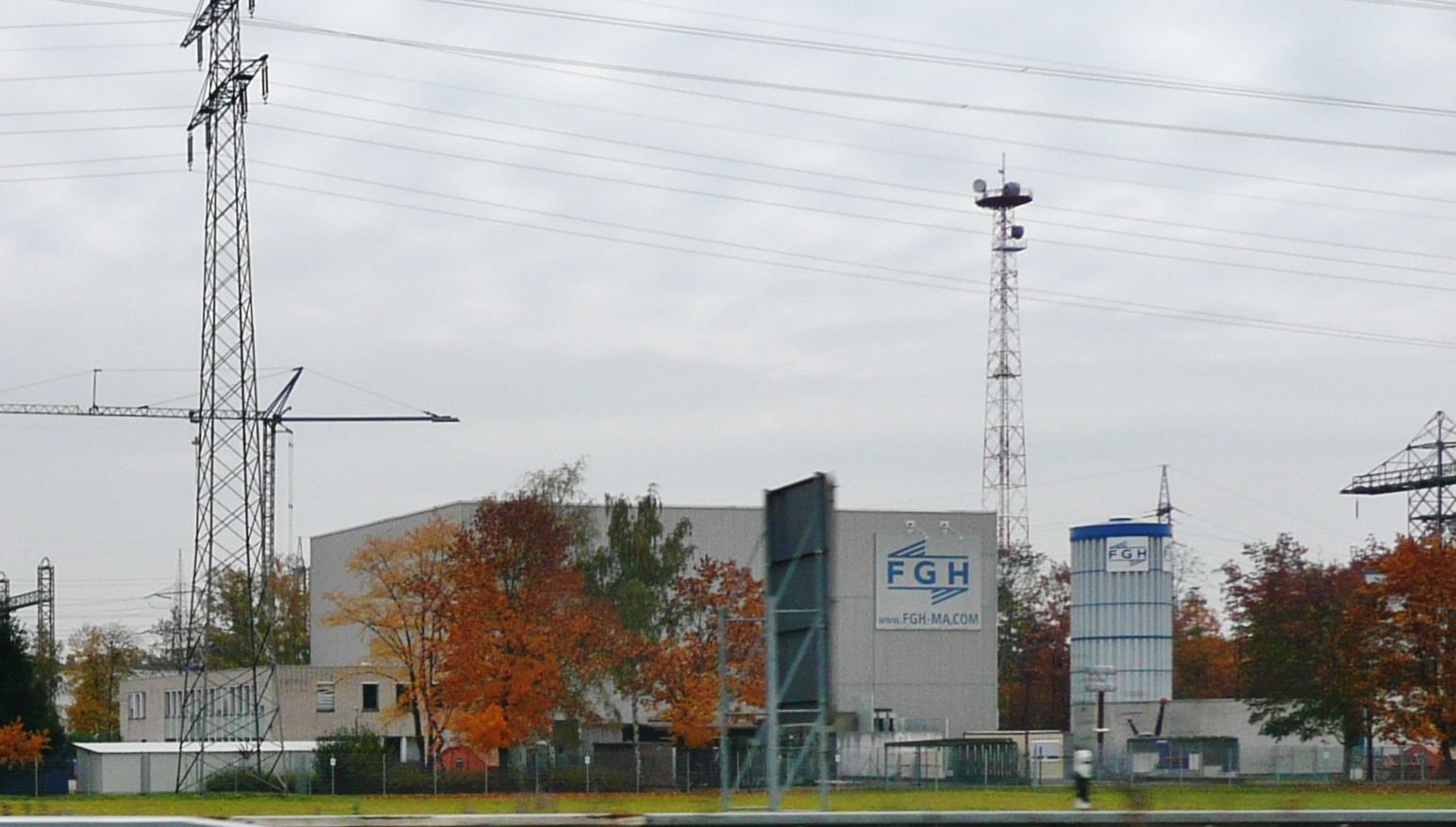
FGH facility in Mannheim

In 2002, CESI acquired the Piacenza's laboratory from ENEL Produzione, which has integrated and extended the offer of monitoring systems for thermoelectric plants during the operation and maintenance. In addition, the company got the hydraulic and structural pole from ENEL; ENEL Hydro S.p.A. which delivers services for hydroelectric power plants. ISMES was purchased in 2004 and, thanks to the deal, CESI increased its competences in land conservation, natural hazards and qualification of civil structures and industrial plants, preservation of monuments and monitoring services. 2005 saw CESI's expertise in laboratory testing being extended through the acquisition of IPH GmbH (located in Berlin) and FGH Engineering & Test GmbH (located in Mannheim) from Vattenfall Europe. Both companies are working in the field of testing of high -, medium - and low voltage electrical components. CESI Ricerca created in 2005 with ENEA, and it has been transferred into GSE (Electrical Services Manager) in 2009.

With a view to cater closely to international client needs, CESI established two new companies: CESI Middle East was set up in 2011 in Dubai and CESI do Brasil in March 2012. In February 2012, CESI Middle East has been contracted by the Kuwait-based Arab Fund for Economic and Social Development to come up with a plan for integrating the loosely connected electricity and natural gas networks of 20 Arab countries. CESI is a founding member of RES4MED, an association that aims to increase renewable energy sources penetration and to analyse the conditions for integrated electricity markets in the Mediterranean area.

In July 2018, CESI acquires EnerNex, a company based in Knoxville, Tennessee, active in the U.S. market in technical consulting and engineering of networks based on innovative technologies.

On December 30, 2019, CESI acquires the property of KEMA B.V. The acquisition includes all the high-voltage testing, inspection and certification activities carried out at the KEMA-owned laboratories in Arnhem (Netherlands) and Prague (Czech Republic). The transaction was completed on March 2, 2020, with the acquisition of the laboratory in Chalfont (U.S.A.).

The KEMA Labs testing and inspections facilities include the world's largest high-power laboratory, with the highest short circuit power (up to 10,000 MVA); the world's first laboratory capable of testing ultra-high voltage products for super grids; the Flex Power Grid Laboratory, for advanced testing of smart grids components.

== Activities ==
CESI main consulting services include: power system studies and energy market studies, general planning and operational planning, design and engineering for HVAC / HVDC interconnections, supervision and control of real-time operations, asset management, integration of renewable energy and storage systems, design and support of smart grids and smart metering implementations, technological and environmental audits, control and regulation systems for power plants, engineering services for test laboratories, environmental impact assessments, civil engineering for hydroelectric and renewable plants and environmental monitoring systems for power plants.

Furthermore, CESI develops and manufactures advanced solar cells (III-V triple Junction GaAs) for space and terrestrial applications (CPV). The company's key global clients include major utilities, Transmission System Operators (TSOs), Distribution System Operators (DSOs), power generation companies (GenCos), system integrators, financial investors and global electromechanical and electronic manufacturers, as well as governments and regulatory authorities. In addition, CESI works in close cooperation with international financial institutions such as, among others, the World Bank Group, the European Bank for Reconstruction and Development, the European Investment Bank, the Inter-American Development Bank, the Asian Development Bank.

== Infrastructure ==
In the infrastructure sector, CESI specializes in civil engineering, geotechnical services, and structural monitoring. CESI provides advanced solutions for the design, inspection, and safety management of major infrastructure projects, including dams, bridges, tunnels, strategic buildings, and transportation networks. Its activities include:

- Geotechnical investigations
- Laboratory and on-site testing
- Numerical modeling
- Continuous monitoring systems based on digital technologies and advanced sensors

Thanks to these capabilities, CESI supports both public and private clients in risk prevention, predictive maintenance, and lifecycle optimization of infrastructure, contributing to the long-term resilience and sustainability of critical assets.

== Structure ==
The company has three operational centers: the main office in Milan and two secondary offices in Piacenza and Seriate (BG). Through subsidiaries it also has two offices in Germany, in Berlin, managed by IPH GmbH, and in Mannheim, managed by FGH Engineering & Test GmbH; one in Dubai, managed by CESI Middle East FZE; Finally, CESI has laboratories in Arnhem, Prague and Chalfont (U.S.A.).

== Main shareholders ==
Shareholders as of November 2025:

- Terna - 42.698%
- Enel - 42.698%
- Prysmian - 6.479%
- HITACHI - 5,675%
- CESI (own shares) - 2.000%
- Balcke Dürr Energy Solutions - 0,357%
- Sediver SpA - 0,094%
