= Shu Yinbiao =

Chinese business executive in the electricity industry

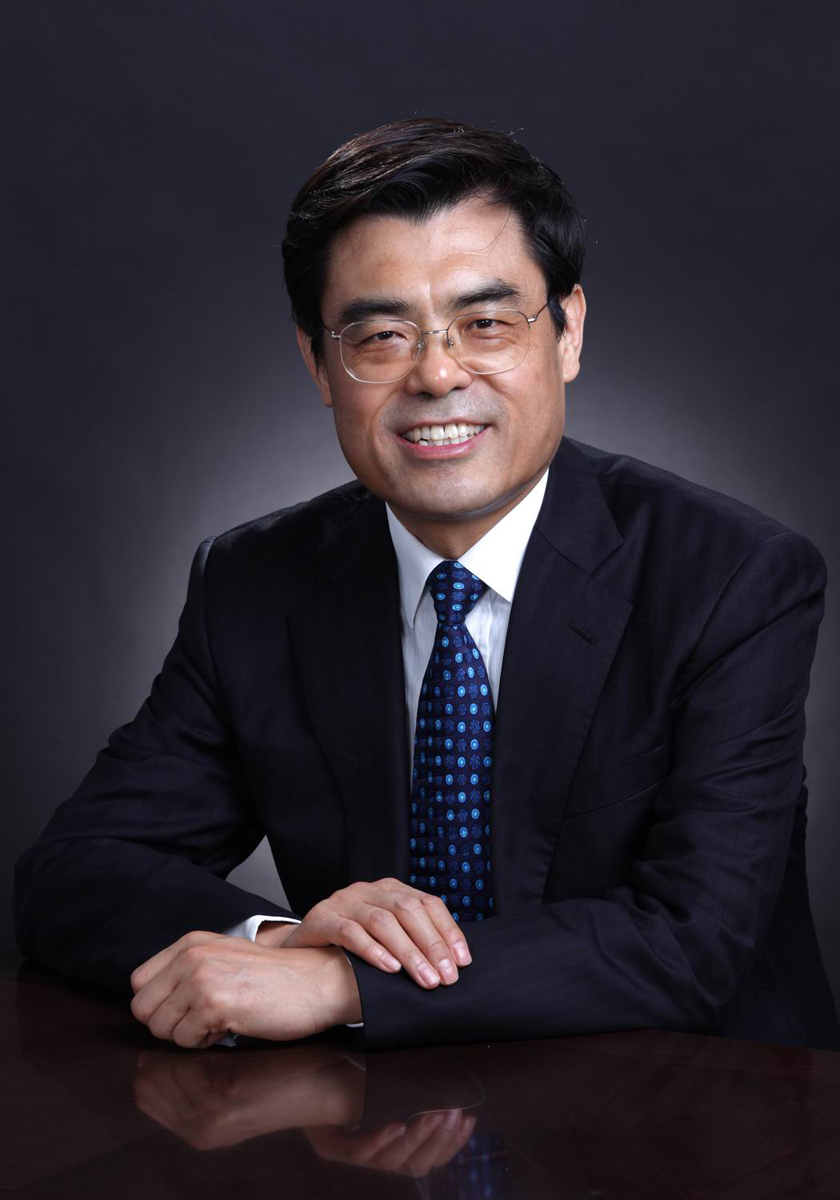
- Shu Yinbiao in 2016
- Born: 1958 (age 67–68); China
- Education: North China Electric Power University and Wuhan University
- Occupation: Business executive
- Employer: State Grid Corporation of China
- Organization(s): International Electrotechnical Commission; Chinese People's Political Consultative Conference
- Political party: Chinese Communist Party

Shu Yinbiao (Chinese: 舒印彪; born 1958) is a Chinese business executive that is the President of the International Electrotechnical Commission and Chairman of China Huaneng Group.

== Early years and education ==
Shu Yinbiao was born in 1958 Hebei province. He graduated from the North China Electric Power University in engineering, and joined the Chinese Communist Party (CCP) in 1985.

In 1989, the Ministry of Education selected Shu to be one of a group of outstanding mid-career officials to participate in a year-long technical study program in the United Kingdom.

In 2007 as a senior engineer in power systems and automation, Shu was awarded his PhD in engineering from Wuhan University.

== Career ==
He has spent his career in the state power administration.

Between 1998 and 2001 he was the deputy director, State Electric Power Corporation, National Electric Power Dispatching and Communication Center, Finance Division.

After State Power was dissolved and restructured, Shu worked in operational and engineering roles in State Grid Corporation of China.

In 2004, Shu began working in management for State Grid, beginning in management roles as assistant to the company's general manager. In 2013, Shu became State Grid's general manager.

After Liu Zhenya's retirement from State Grid, in 2016 Shu became the enterprise's chairman and Chinese Communist Party Committee Secretary. Shu adopted a strategy of "re-electrification" which sought to replace coal and petroleum power with electricity generated from renewable energy sources.

In 2017, Shu served as a delegate to the 19th National Congress of the Chinese Communist Party and subsequently as a member of the 13th National Committee of the Chinese People's Political Consultative Conference.

In 2018, Shu left State Grid.

In 2019, he was appointed as the Chairman of the China Huaneng Group Co. Ltd. In 2022, he reached retirement age and left China Huaneng.

He then became President of the IEC. He is also a member of the Energy Experts Consultative Committee of the Chinese State Council, and Acting Chairman of CSEE (Chinese Society for Electrical Engineering). He is also an active member of IEEE.

He has been extensively involved in the technical research and management of power-grid planning, engineering, dispatch and operation. Shu has contributed to the development and application of power grid planning technology, UHV power transmission technology, and complex power grid operation and control. He has also focused on the integration of wind power, solar power and other new energy sources into grid technology and smart grid standardization.
