= ADMIE =

Energy transmission operator in Greece

- Native name: Ανεξάρτητος Διαχειριστής Μεταφοράς Ηλεκτρικής Ενέργειας A.E.
- Industry: Electric utility
- Founded: August 23, 2011; 14 years ago
- Headquarters: Athens, Greece
- Area served: Greece
- Products: Electrical grid, Electric power transmission
- Website: www.admie.gr

Independent Power Transmission Operator S.A. (IPTO or ADMIE from "ΑΔΜΗΕ" - Ανεξάρτητος Διαχειριστής Μεταφοράς Ηλεκτρικής Ενέργειας A.E. in Greek) is the Transmission System Operator for the Hellenic Electricity Transmission System. The mission of the company is the operation, control, maintenance and development of the national transmission system of Greece to ensure the reliable and efficient electricity supply, as well as the operation of the electricity market following the principles of transparency and equality.

Since February 2012 it is independent in operation and management, retaining the necessary independence required for compliance with 2009/72/EC EU Directive. Till the end of June 2017 it was a wholly owned subsidiary of Public Power Corporation of Greece (PPC S.A.). As of June 20, 2017 ADMIE follows the model of proprietary separated Administrator (Ownership Unbundling) and is fully harmonized with the Directive 2009/72/EC.

The current shareholder structure of ADMIE is as follows: 51% ADMIE HOLDINGS Inc., 25% DES ADMIE S.A., 24% State Grid Europe Limited.

Until 31 January 2012, ADMIE was a joint company with the Hellenic Electricity Market Operator S.A. (now called LAGIE) under the name "Hellenic Transmission System Operator S.A.".

ADMIE's compliance with the requirements applicable to the model of the Independent Transmission Operator was certified by the Regulatory Authority for Energy (RAE) in December 2012.

ADMIE S.A. is a member of ENTSO-E (the European Network of Transmission System Operators for Electricity).

In summer 2022 analysts said that if Russian gas was completely stopped ADMIE would struggle to cope.

== Privatization ==
The Greek Bailout Agreement in July 2015 includes the privatization of ADMIE.

For this purpose, ADMIE is to be split from PPC S.A., with a 51% stake to be transferred to the Greek State and a 49% stake to be sold, including a stake of at least 29% to be offered to strategic Investors.

On 21 October 2016, a consortium formed by Terna S.p.A. and F2i SGR S.p.A. (both with 50% stakes) submitted a binding offer for the acquisition of a 24% stake in ADMIE. Finally, the 24% of the company was sold to the State Grid Corporation of China.

== See also ==
- Energy in Greece
