= State Grid Corporation of China =

State-owned electric utility monopoly of China

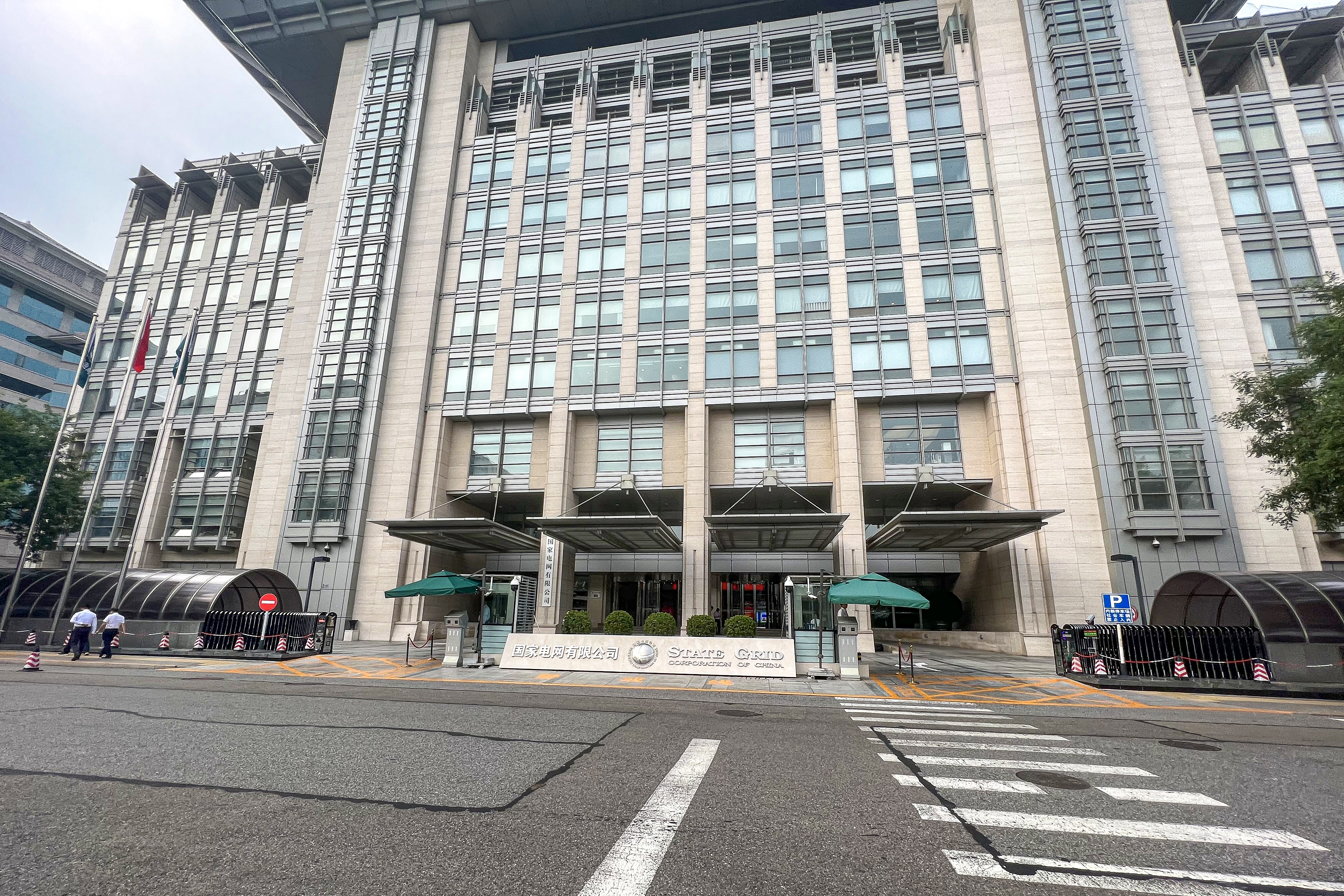
- State Grid headquarters in Beijing's Xicheng District
- Trade name: SGCC; State Grid
- Native name: 国家电网有限公司
- Type: State-owned enterprise
- Industry: Electric power industry; Public utility
- Founded: 2002; 24 years ago
- Headquarters: Xicheng District, Beijing, China
- Area served: Worldwide
- Key people: Zhang Zhigang (Chairman)
- Products: Electricity
- Services: Electric power transmission; Electricity distribution; Power engineering; Smart grid
- Revenue: ▲US$555.37 billion (2025)
- Net income: ▲US$11.12 billion (2025)
- Total assets: ▲US$881.05 billion (2025)
- Total equity: ▲US$394.25 billion (2025)
- Number of employees: 1,361,000 (2024)
- Website: www.sgcc.com.cn

State Grid Corporation of China
- Chinese: 国家电网有限公司
- Literal meaning: National Power Grid Company Limited
Transcriptions
Standard Mandarin
- Hanyu Pinyin: Guójiā Diànwǎng Yǒuxiàn Gōngsī

The State Grid Corporation of China (SGCC), commonly known as the State Grid, is a Chinese state-owned electric utility corporation. It is the largest utility company in the world. As of March 2024, State Grid is the world's third largest company overall by revenue, behind Walmart and Amazon, and is also the largest government-owned company by revenue. In 2023 it was reported as having 1.3 million employees, 1.1 billion customers and revenue equivalent to US$546 billion.

In 2025, State Grid ranked 1st on World Brand Lab's "China's 500 Most Influential Brands" list with a brand value of 715.258 billion yuan. It is overseen by the State-owned Assets Supervision and Administration Commission of the State Council (SASAC).

After the electricity Plant-Grid Separation reform in early 2002, the assets of State Electric Power Corporation (国家电力公司) were divided into five power generation groups that retained the power plants and five regional subsidiaries belonging to the State Grid Corporation of China in Beijing.

== History ==
State Grid is one of the "core" central state-owned enterprises (SOE) overseen by SASAC. The company is a pioneer in developing clean energy technology.

China began an initiative to reform the country's power sector in a three-stage process in 1986. In the third and final stage in March 2002 the State Council of the People's Republic of China put into effect a plan to restructure the country's electric power system in order to create competition and separate generation and transmission functions. The State Grid Corporation of China was founded on December 29, 2002, when the restructuring divided the former State Power Corporation of China into two grid companies, five generation groups and four accessorial business companies. The two grid companies created were the State Grid Corporation of China and a smaller China Southern Power Grid Company. SGCC accounts for 80% of the Chinese grid, with China Southern Power Grid accounting for the other 20%. At its creation, SGCC company had a generation capacity of 6.47 gigawatts.

In 2003 and progressively so through the early 2000s, electrical shortages caused the government to institute rolling blackouts. The State Grid Corporation estimated there were 1 trillion yuan in losses from 2002 to 2005. The State Grid Corporation of China ran the first 1,000-kilovolt alternating current power line between Northern Shanxi and center Hubei in January 2009. In 2012 it began operation of an 800-kilovolt direct current line that sends hydropower from western Sichuan to Shanghai. It also has an alternating current loop line in the Yangtze River delta, and three longitudinal alternating current lines that bring power to Southern China from the Northern region.

Beginning in 2011, State Grid began transferring operation assets from regional power grid companies to the provincial level network companies.

The State Grid Corporation was involved in a multi-phase smart-grid project for China's electrical grid planned for 2011–2015. China's smart grid efforts are different from those in the United States in that its plans heavily use ultra high voltage (UHV) lines. Several UHV construction projects began in 2012 to bring UHV power lines across Huainan, Wannan, and Shanghai and another from Xilingol League to Nanjing. By 2015, the company planned to have three more horizontal UHV lines through West Inner Mongolia to Weifang, from Central Shanxi–Xuzhou to Yaan–southern Anhui and 11 other lines by 2015.

In 2013, State Grid established a Board of Directors at its holding company level and Liu Zhenya became its Chairman. He continued to serve as Party Secretary. Liu adopted the strategy of "one special, four large": the development of UHV power grids (the "one special") and hydropower, coal power, nuclear power, and renewable energy (the "four large"). Liu increased State Grid's investment in UHV research and development, creating a UHV Power Grid Engineering Group and a UHV Grid Engineering Working Group.

On October 29, 2014, The Central Commission for Discipline Inspection declared that the general manager of State Grid Shanghai Municipal Electric Power, Feng Jun, was detained in an anti-graft operation overseen by the commission. In 2017, his assets (worth 53 million yuan) were seized, and he was sentenced to life in prison.

In 2015, SGCC proposed the Global Energy Interconnection, a long-term proposal to develop globally integrated smart grids and ultra high voltage transmission networks to connect over 80 countries. The idea is supported by General Secretary of the Chinese Communist Party Xi Jinping and his administration in attempting to develop support in various internal forums, including UN bodies.

After Liu Zhenya's retirement from State Grid, in 2016 Shu Yinbiao became the enterprise's Chairman and Party Secretary. Shu continued Liu's strategy of "one special, four large" and instituted a new strategy of "re-electrification" which sought to replace coal and petroleum power with electricity generated from renewable energy sources.

As of 2024, SGCC is the world's largest energy utility company. SGCC is the third biggest company in the world (as measured by revenues) in the 2023 Fortune Global 500. It operates almost all of China's energy transmission network.

== Overseas investments ==
In 2008, State Grid general manager Liu Zhenya created State Grid International Development Company to oversee State Grid's foreign investments. In 2012, this subsidiary was placed directly under the State Grid holding company.

By 2019, State Grid had ten overseas offices and agreements with partners in the United States, Germany, and with international non-governmental organizations for projects including developing new smart grid technology.

As of 2021, State Grid had part ownership of, or operated, electricity assets in Brazil, Italy, Portugal, Greece, Australia, Georgia, Oman, and the Philippines. It had built or upgraded electricity assets in more than 30 Asian, African, and Latin American countries. State Grid had also exported more equipment to more than 70 countries.

=== Philippines ===
During the administration of President Gloria Macapagal Arroyo on December 12, 2007, two consortia bid for a 25-year license to run the Philippines power grid—privatization of the management of the Philippine government-owned National Transmission Corporation (TransCo), the consortium of Monte Oro Grid Resources Corp., led by businessman Enrique Razon, comprising the State Grid Corporation of China, and Calaca High Power Corp., won an auction conducted by the Power Sector Assets and Liabilities Management (PSALM) Corp. as it submitted the highest offer of $3.95 billion, for the right to operate TransCo for 25 years, outbidding San Miguel Energy, a unit of the Filipino San Miguel Corporation (bid of $3.905 billion), Dutch firm TPG Aurora BV, and Malaysia's TNB Prai Sdn Bhd. This initiated the privatization process for the transmission sector. The resulting consortium became the National Grid Corporation of the Philippines (NGCP).

On February 28, 2008, TransCo's concession agreement with NGCP was executed and became effective. The agreement between NGCP and TransCo was signed by TransCo president Arthur Aguilar, PSALM president Jose Ibazeta, and NGCP directors Walter Brown, Elmer Pedregosa and Du Zhigang. In November of that same year, Congress approved bicameral resolution granting franchise to NGCP to manage and operate its transmission facilities nationwide. Arroyo signed Republic Act 9511 which granted NGCP to operate and manage the country's power grid in December 2008.

On January 15, 2009, TransCo turned over the operations, maintenance, management, construction, expansion, and eminent domain of the Philippine power grid and its related assets and facilities to NGCP which marked the start of the 25 year concession period and franchise and renewable for another 25 years with a total of 50 years, which privatized and turned them over from the Philippine government to the private sector after 72 years and 2 months since the establishment of another government-owned corporation serving as TransCo's predecessor in power grid operations, management, and ownership National Power Corporation (NAPOCOR/NPC) that operated, maintained, and owned the grid from November 3, 1936 to March 1, 2003. This created the temporary dual or separated ownership of the grid between private (NGCP) and government (TransCo) where NGCP temporarily owns the structures or components both entirely new and secondhand that abandoned their pre-concession period original usage and government ownership (NAPOCOR/NPC and TransCo-era), their exact lands or locations, and rights of ways (ROWs) or power line portions acquired and designated from January 15, 2009 while TransCo still owns those with acquisition and designation made until the said date of January 2009. The franchise and concession period will end on December 1, 2058.

=== Other countries ===
In Brazil, State Grid is involved in developing, building, and operating hydropower facilities. State Grid acquired the control of CPFL Energia S.A. for the equivalent of US$3.4 billion in 2017. State Grid built the 2000 km Ultra High Voltage power line delivering hydropower to the megacities Rio de Janeiro and São Paulo.

In Chile, State Grid acquired Chilquinta Energía, the third-largest distributor of electricity in Chile, and Tecnored SA, which provides construction services to Chilquinta, from U.S. power company Sempra Energy. The deal was closed on June 24, 2020. State Grid's major Brazilian projects include two ultrahigh voltage lines connecting with Belo Monte Hydroelectric Plant in the northeast with São Paulo state, Brazil's core industrial area. UHV lines are important in South America where renewable energy generation is typically far from the locations where electricity demand is highest.

In Portugal, State Grid has a 25% stake in REN since the second stage of its privatization (in 2012–2014). In Australia, State Grid owns a 41% stake in ElectraNet, a 19.9% stake in AusNet Services, and 60% stake in Jemena.

In Italy, State Grid owns 35% stake in CDP Reti, which owns a third of Italy's power and gas grid operators Terna and Snam.

Likewise, State Grid also owns 24% of the Greek grid operator ADMIE. IPTO is the only grid operator in Greece and the state still owns 51%. The rest is owned by private shareholders.

== Finances ==
Year	Revenue (US$ billions)	Profit (US$ billions)	Assets (US$ billions)	Equity (US$ billions)	Employees
2012	298.4	12.3	374.5	156.3	849,594
2013	333.4	8.0	424.5	178.0	867,836
2014	339.4	9.8	466.3	198.5	921,964
2015	329.6	10.2	478.5	207.3	927,839
2016	315.2	9.6	489.8	209.5	926,067
2017	348.9	9.5	585.3	239.7	913,546
2018	387.1	8.2	572.3	240.0	917,717
2019	383.9	8.0	596.6	251.5	907,677
2020	386.6	5.6	666.1	279.4	896,360
2021	460.6	7.1	735.4	310.2	871,145
2022	530.0	8.2	710.8	304.2	870,287
2023	545.9	9.2	781.1	344.2	1,361,423
2024	548.4	10.0	797.7	351.9	1,354,310
2025	555.4	11.1	881.0	394.3	1,347,273

== Subsidiaries ==
- State Grid Yingda Group
  - Yingda International Trust (89.76%)

== See also ==
- China Southern Power Grid
- China Datang Corporation
- List of companies of China
- Smart grid
- Sieyuan Electric
