= GreenGen =

- Country: China
- Location: Tianjin
- Status: Commissioned
- Construction began: 2009
- Commission date: 2012
- Owners: China Huaneng Group; China Datang Group; China Huadian Corporation; China Guodian Corporation; China Power Investment Corporation; Shenhua Group; State Development and Investment Co. China Coal Group; Peabody Energy
- Operator: China Huaneng Group

Thermal power station
- Primary fuel: Coal
- Combined cycle?: Yes

Power generation
- Nameplate capacity: 250 MW

GreenGen (Chinese: 绿色煤电; pinyin: lǜsèméidiàn; lit. 'green colour coal electricity') is a project in Tianjin, China that aims to research and develop high-tech low-emissions coal-based power generation plants.

== Motivation ==
China's primary energy source is coal. To promote sustainable energy, a group of scientists founded Greengen to develop new energy technologies.

With international agreements tightening regulations on CO2 emissions, the GreenGen project was initiated to produce energy with minimal emissions. The project employs coal gasification to generate both hydrogen and electric power.

As a result of the project, China has become a more energy-efficient nation while simultaneously reducing greenhouse gas emissions.

== History ==
The GreenGen project was initiated in 2004 by the China Huaneng Group (CHNG). The project has undergone a three-stage development process. The GreenGen Ltd. Co. China was founded in 2005 by CHNG, China Datang Group, China Huadian Corporation, China Guodian Corporation, China Power Investment Corporation, Shenhua Group, State Development & Investment Co., and the China Coal Group.

Lingang Industrial Park was selected as the site for the plant. This site was chosen for its close range to chemical facilities to optimize GreenGen's byproducts. The CO_{2} created from the project will go to other projects in the industrial park.

Beginning in 2009, Phase 1 focused on building and mastering the 250 MW integrated gasification combined cycle (IGCC), which is a coal gasification process that turns coal into a gas before burning it, hence allowing power generation to be more efficient and releasing less carbon and other pollutants. The plant was scheduled to start operating in 2012 but this got delayed until 2012. The second phase began in 2014. It uses fuel cells and turbines for electricity generation and converts CO_{2} to industrial use. The third phase built a 400 MW demonstration plant, integrating the key technologies from the previous phases while aiming to have minimum emissions.

In 2007, the project was joined by Peabody Energy, the world's largest private sector coal company.

The GreenGen IGCC plant was completed by 2012. As of 2020, it is the only remaining IGCC plant operating in China. The efforts of the plant were a result of China's research efforts to master the technology since the 1980s. Its completion is a marker of a scale-up period. The project has also been important in international collaboration for clean energy. While seeking collaboration with China's National Energy Administration to enhance the Texas Clean Energy Project (TCEP), the U.S Department of Energy partnered with CHNG, which involved leveraging the experience gained from the GreenGen project.

== Project ==
IGCC

The GreenGen IGCC plant is composed of the following main components: a coal gasifier, an air separation unit, a syngas purification system, a methyldiethanolamine sulfur removal system, and a power block which has a gas turbine generator, a steam turbine generator, and a heat recovery steam generator. The Huaneng Clean Energy Research Institute designed the coal gasifier. The air separation unit is able to produce liquid oxygen, nitrogen, and argon.

The coal gasification works through a 2000 tonnes/day gasifier that converts coal into a mixture of carbon monized and hydrogen (also known as syngas). High-purity oxygen in a water wall-cooled system is essential to keep this part of the process functioning. Up to 99% of the oxygen reacts with the coal to produce syngas.

The gas cleaning system removes impurities from the syngas and ensures reduced emissions (impurities includes particular matter, sulfur compounds, and other contaminants). This is a two step process involving dry and wet removal techniques. The gas cleaning section is located between the gasification system and combine-cycle power block.

Finally, the combined-cycle power block is the key component that integrates a gas and steam turbine to maximize power generation. The core gas turbine burns syngas and combusts it to generate electricity. Exhaust gases are taken to a Heat Recovery Steam Generator (HRSG) which captures waste heat. Steam steam produced in this process is sent to the steam turbine. Additional electricity is generated here using heat recovered from the gas turbine.

The entire process significantly improves the efficiency of the plant (41% when Shenhua coal is used).

=== Criticism ===
Currently, IGCC plants cannot compete with coal power in China. The price of electricity for coal power plants is about half of the price for IGCC plants.

There is a controversy in China about whether more IGCC plants should be built. One side argues that more pilot plants would allow for better research and experimentation with the technology. The other side argues that investing on more plants would only increase financial burden on the state because it owns the majority of the electric industry in China.

==== Comparisons ====
A similar IGCC plant in the United States market was constructed using Shell's IGCC technology. The GreenGen IGCC plant was used to compare the cost between an IGCC plant in China and one in the United States. The costs for equipment, materials, and labor for the Shell IGCC plant in the US was found to be approximately 1.5 times more expensive than an IGCC plant in China. The gasifier area for the Shell IGCC requires about $1065/kW, while that of the GreenGen IGCC requires about $267/kW. The gasifier is one of the most expensive parts in an IGCC plant, which is an advantage for constructing them in China rather than the United States.

== See also ==
- Coal power in China
