= Huaneng =

Huaneng may refer to:

- China Huaneng Group, a Chinese state-owned power generation conglomerate
  - Huaneng Power International, listed subsidiary of China Huaneng Group
  - Huaneng Renewables, listed subsidiary of China Huaneng Group
