= China Power Investment Corporation =

Strategic state-owned electric company

- Native name: 中国电力投资集团公司
- Company type: State-owned enterprise
- Industry: Public utility
- Predecessor: China Power International Holding
- Founded: 31 March 2003
- Founder: SASAC
- Defunct: 2015
- Fate: Merged with State Nuclear Power Technology
- Successor: State Power Investment Corporation
- Headquarters: Beijing, China
- Area served: Mainland China
Key people
Lu Qizhou	(GM)
- Products: Power generation
- Net income: ▼CN¥1.442 billion (2014)
- Total assets: ▲CN¥680.388 billion (2014)
- Total equity: ▲CN¥44.439 billion (2014)
- Owner: State-owned Assets Supervision and Administration Commission
- Subsidiaries: China Power International Holding; China Power International Development; Shanghai Electric Power; Yuanda Environmental Protection

Chinese name
- Simplified Chinese: 中国电力投资集团公司
- Traditional Chinese: 中國電力投資集團公司
Transcriptions
Standard Mandarin
- Hanyu Pinyin: Zhōngguó Diànlì Tóuzī Jítuán Gōngsī

Abbreviation
- Simplified Chinese: 中国电力投资
- Traditional Chinese: 中國電力投資
Transcriptions
Standard Mandarin
- Hanyu Pinyin: Zhōngguó Diànlì Tóuzī

Second abbreviation
- Simplified Chinese: 中电投
- Traditional Chinese: 中電投
Transcriptions
Standard Mandarin
- Hanyu Pinyin: Zhōng Diàn Tóu
- Website: www.cpicorp.com.cn
- Footnotes / references in consolidated financial statement

China Power Investment Corporation also known as CPI Group was one of the five largest state-owned electricity producers in mainland China. It was administrated by the State-owned Assets Supervision and Administration Commission (SASAC) of the State Council. It was engaged in development, investment, construction, operation, and management of power plants and power generation in twenty-seven Chinese provinces. It supplies approximately ten percent of the country's electricity.

China Power Investment Corporation was the parent company of 4 listed companies, China Power International Development, China Power New Energy Development (later became joint-significant shareholder, after China Three Gorges Corporation acquired the share of that company), Shanghai Electric Power and Yuanda Environmental Protection. The group also significantly owned Jilin Electric Power.

It was merged with the State Nuclear Power Technology Corporation to form the State Power Investment Corporation in 2015.

== History ==
=== China Power International Holding ===
The predecessor of China Power Investment Corporation, China Power International Holding Limited (Chinese: 中國電力國際有限公司; lit. 'China Power International Co.', 'Ltd.'; CPIH), was a "window company" of the Ministry of Power Industry that was incorporated in 1994 in the British Hong Kong as a special-purpose vehicle that was formed to finance the Ministry through international capital market. In 1998 CPIH became a subsidiary of a mega-conglomerate, the State Power Corporation of China, which replacing the commercial function of the Ministry.

=== China Power Investment Corporation ===
In 2002, the State Power Corporation of China was dismantled as groups of companies of power grid (such as State Grid Corporation of China and China Southern Power Grid) and power plants (such as the big five power groups, China Huaneng Group, China Huadian, China Datang, China Guodian and China Power Investment). China Power International Holding became a subsidiary of newly formed China Power Investment Corporation instead. In the same year the former leader of the State Power Corporation of China, Gao Yan had fled China after being investigated for corruption. The formal approval of the formation of China Power Investment Corporation was on 2 February 2003, at first it had 5 wholly owned first-tier subsidiaries. The formation date on the legal person certificate was on 31 March 2003.

The new group made one of its first acquisition in July 2003, acquiring a minority stake of Companhia de Electricidade de Macau (CEM) via CPI Group's subsidiary China Power International Holding (CPI Holding). CEM was the electricity producer as well as supplied the electricity to the end user in Macau S.A.R., China.

Soon after the formation of China Power Investment Corporation as the new parent company, China Power International Holding formed China Power International Development on 24 March 2004 as another intermediate holding company of the group to list some assets to the Stock Exchange of Hong Kong on 15 October 2004. It was reported that the group was the only one among the big five, had a license to run nuclear power plants in China, which the other licensee were state-owned nuclear power companies.

In 2005 China Power Investment Holding formed "China Hong Kong Power Development", a joint-venture company with Vertex Group and China Southern Power Grid for the preparation of electricity supply to Hong Kong. However, it was never materialized.

In 2007, CPI Group was one of the founders of State Nuclear Power Technology Corporation. At first CPI Group owned 10% stake.

In 2010, it was reported that Resourcehouse, a private company owned by Australian businessman and politician Clive Palmer, had signed an agreement to supply coal to China Power Investment Holding for 20 years. However, China Power Investment Corporation and subsidiaries had denied. Nevertheless, the "agreement" appeared in Resourcehouse's pre-IPO prospectus.

China Power Investment Corporation was merged with the State Nuclear Power Technology Corporation to form the State Power Investment Corporation in 2015.

China Power Investment Corporation is involved in the development of renewable energy projects.

== Corporate leadership ==
As of 2014, the deputy general manager of China Power Investment Corporation (CPI Group) Li Xiaolin, was also the chairman China Power International Holding, chairman and CEO of the listed subsidiary China Power International Development and chairman of associate company China Power New Energy Development. She is the daughter of Li Peng, former Premier of the People's Republic of China from 1988 to 1998, who also served as the Ministry of Power Industry in 1981 to 1982 as well as vice-minister from 1979 to 1981. His son, Li Xiaopeng, was the CEO of China Huaneng Group. Li Xiaolin joined China Power Investment Holding, the predecessor of China Power Investment Corporation at the date of foundation in 1994.

The last general manager of CPI Group was Lu Qizhou who retired after the merger, despite still served as a member of the national committee of Chinese People's Political Consultative Conference. Among the deputy general managers, Meng Zhenping (Chinese: 孟振平) was remained in the successor State Power Investment Corporation in 2015 after the merger as general manager, while Li Xiaolin was re-appointed to China Datang Corporation. The remaining 5 deputy general managers of CPI Group, 3 of them were remained in the successor in 2015; which Zou Zhengping (Chinese: 邹正平) was appointed as a director of Dongfeng Motor Corporation instead.

== Subsidiaries ==
As of 31 December 2014

- China Power International Holding (100%)
  - China Power Development Limited (unofficial Chinese name 中国电力发展有限公司, a company incorporated in the British Virgin Islands) (100%)
  - China Power International Development (58.95% indirectly), incorporated and listed in Hong Kong, is CPI Group's major holding company with many power stations in China. The company had total assets of RMB 284.2 billion at the end of 2008 and was consolidating its regional assets.
  - China Hong Kong Power Development Company Limited (50% joint venture) - planned to supply electricity to Hong Kong. However, it was never materialized.
- Shanghai Electric Power (54.38%)
- Yuanda Environmental Protection, listed in Shanghai Stock Exchange, is an environmental protection company that manages waste water and gas and solid waste.
- China Power Investment Nuclear Power (100%)
  - Shandong Nuclear Power (indirect) - operator of Haiyang Nuclear Power Plant; the other shareholders were State Nuclear Power Technology Corporation, Shandong International Trust, China Huaneng Group (via subsidiary), China Guodian, China National Nuclear Power and Yantai Blue Sky Investment and Development
- Huanghe Hydropower Development Co., Ltd. (Chinese: 黄河上游水电开发有限责任公司; lit. 'Yellow River Upper Stream Hydropower Development Co.', 'Ltd.') (94.17%)

== Joint ventures ==
As of 2014

- Hongyanhe Nuclear Power (45%) – operator of Hongyanhe Nuclear Power Plant

== Equity investments ==
As of 31 December 2014

- China Power New Energy Development (28.16%), a wind power company.
- Jilin Electric Power, listed on the Shenzhen Stock Exchange, is a power company that generates electricity including operating wind power projects in Jilin.
- Companhia de Electricidade de Macau (via China Power International Holding)
- Jiangsu Nuclear Power (30%) - operator of Tianwan Nuclear Power Plant
- Sanmen Nuclear Power (14%)) - operator of Sanmen Nuclear Power Station
- Nuclear Power Plant Qinshan Joint Venture Company (6%) - operator of Qinshan Nuclear Power Plant Phase 2
- The Third Qinshan Joint Venture Company (20%) - operator of Qinshan Nuclear Power Plant Phase 3

== Overseas projects ==
The CPI in conjunction with the Burmese government is constructing the Myitsone Dam, a large dam that when completed by 2017 is estimated to produce 3,600 to 6,000 megawatts of electricity for the Yunnan province.
