= China Power Clean Energy Development =

Renewable energy company

- Native name: 中国电力新能源发展有限公司
- Traded as: SEHK: 735
- Industry: Electricity, renewable energy
- Founded: 2006 in Bermuda (legal domicile)
- Headquarters: Hong Kong, China
- Key people: Wang Binghua (Chairman); Wang Zhongtang (CEO)
- Products: Electric power
- Parent: State Power Investment Corporation

Chinese name
- Simplified Chinese: 中国电力新能源发展有限公司
- Traditional Chinese: 中國電力新能源發展有限公司
Transcriptions
Standard Mandarin
- Hanyu Pinyin: Zhōngguó Diànlì Xīnnéngyuán Fāzhǎn Yǒuxiàn Gōngsī

Abbreviation
- Simplified Chinese: 中电新能源
- Traditional Chinese: 中電新能源
Transcriptions
Standard Mandarin
- Hanyu Pinyin: Zhōngdiàn Xīnnéngyuán
- Website: www.cpne.com.hk

China Power Clean Energy Development (CPNED), formerly China Power New Energy Development Company Limited (CPNE) and Oriental Investment, is a Chinese renewable energy company established in 2006 and listed on the Hong Kong Stock Exchange. It operates hydropower, wind, natural gas, solar, and waste-to-energy power plants.

== History ==
In 2011 CPNED became the first renewable energy company in China to succeed raising substantial hard currency funding via a bond issue.

In 2010, the company acquired China Power Dafeng Wind Power Company for US$74 million. In 2012, the company agreed to acquire a Chinese wind turbine unit of Suzlon Energy for US$60 million. However, this deal was terminated.

In 2015, the company announced that it would take over State Nuclear Power Technology Corporation. More precisely, China Power New Energy Development signed a MoU to acquire by issuing new shares to SNPTC and/or another SPIC's subsidiary China Power New Energy Limited. (Note: China Power New Energy Limited, a company which was incorporated in Hong Kong, is not the listed company China Power New Energy Development Limited, which was incorporated in Bermuda. China Power New Energy Limited is an indirect wholly owned subsidiary of China Power International Holding, in turn China Power International Holding is a wholly owned subsidiary of State Power Investment Corporation, previously known as China Power Investment Corporation before 2015 merger; China Power New Energy Limited, China Power International Holding were intermediate holding companies of the shares of the listed company.) and SNPTC to sell their nuclear power assets and businesses.

== Ownership ==
China Power Investment Corporation (now known as State Power Investment Corporation) was the majority owner of the company via intermediate holding companies.

In December 2011, China Three Gorges Corporation paid HK$2.1 billion (US$270 million) for a 29% stake in CPNED to become the largest shareholder of the company that time.

== Corporate leadership ==
The chairman till December 2015 was Li Xiaolin, then also chairman and CEO of China Power International Development and vice general manager of China Power Investment Corporation. She became the chairman of the company in May 2007, replacing Lai Leong in this position. In December 2015, she was replaced by Wang Binghua, chairman of State Power Investment Corporation (ex-China Power Investment Corporation).

== Projects ==
In May 2011 CPINE (the overseas arm of CPNED) signed a cooperation framework with First Solar of Arizona to work on photovoltaic projects in China and the U.S., with a plan to match First Solar's installed capacity in America in China.

By 30 June 2016, the company had installed power generation capacity of 3,650.1 MW, including 1,429.5 MW of wind, 1,300 MW of natural gas, 595.8 MW of hydropower, 228.2 MW of photovoltaic, and 78 MW of waste-to-energy generation facilities. in addition, 842.75 MW of capacities were under construction.

In 2015 the first three completed projects of the Group commenced operation:

- No. 6 Gansu Anbei Wind Power Project with capacity of 46.5 MW,
- Hainan, Changjiang - Photovoltaic Power Project with capacity of 20.0MW and
- Yunnan, Yuanjiang - Photovoltaic Power Project with capacity of 20.0 MW, with installed capacity of 86.5MW in total.

Four more projects were completed in the first quarter of 2016:

- Two generation units at Phase II of Guangdong Dongguan Natural Gas Power Project with capacity of 470.0MW each
- No. 3 Unit at Phase II of Hainan Haikou Waste-to-energy Power Project with capacity of 12.0MW
- Phase III of Gansu Baiyin Photovoltaic Power Project with capacity of 15.0MW
- Gansu Guazhou - Photovoltaic Power Project with capacity of 8.0MW
