= Huadian =

Huadian may refer to the following entities in mainland China:

- Huadian, Jilin (桦甸市), a city
- China Huadian Corporation (华电集团), state-owned power generation enterprise
  - Huadian Power International (华电国际电力控股有限公司), subsidiary and listed company of China Huadian Corporation
- Huadian Formation, palaeontological formation located in Jilin
- Huadian, Ji'an, Jilin (花甸镇), a town
- Huadian, a form of Traditional Chinese forehead decoration makeup.
