= Zhao Shiyan =

Chinese communist revolutionary (1901–1927)

- 赵世炎
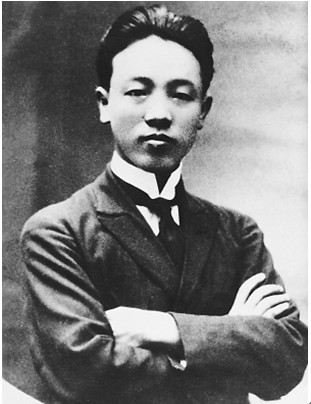

Member of the 5th Central Committee of the Chinese Communist Party
- In office 9 May 1927 – 19 July 1927
- General Secretary: Chen Duxiu

Personal details
- Born: 13 April 1901 Youyang Zhou, Sichuan, Qing China
- Died: 19 July 1927 (aged 26) Shanghai, Republic of China
- Party: Chinese Communist Party
- Spouse: Xia Zhixu
- Relations: Zhao Juntao (sister); Li Shuoxun (brother-in-law); Li Peng (nephew)
- Children: 2 sons
- Parent: Zhao Dengzhi
- Education: High School Affiliated to Beijing Normal University

Chinese name
- Simplified Chinese: 赵世炎
- Traditional Chinese: 趙世炎
Transcriptions
Standard Mandarin
- Hanyu Pinyin: Zhào Shìyán

Courtesy name
- Simplified Chinese: 琴荪
- Traditional Chinese: 琴蓀
Transcriptions
Standard Mandarin
- Hanyu Pinyin: Qíng Sūn

Zhao Shiyan (Chinese: 赵世炎; 13 April 1901 – 19 July 1927) was a Chinese Communist revolutionary and former Chinese premier Li Peng's uncle.

== Biography ==
Zhao was born in Youyang Zhou, Sichuan (now Youyang Tujia and Miao Autonomous County, Chongqing), on 13 April 1901, to Zhao Dengzhi (赵登之). In 1915, Zhao went to Beijing to study at the High School Affiliated with Beijing Normal University and majored in English. In 1919, he participated in the May Fourth Movement, China Youth Association. The following year, he went to France to study, co-founded the Chinese Communist Party (CCP). In 1922, Zhao Shiyan and Ho Chi Minh were invited to join the French Communist Party. In 1922, he went to the Soviet Union and studied at the Communist University of the Toilers of the East. In 1923, he was appointed as CCP Committee Chairman of Beijing. In the same year in December, he was appointed as Chairman of the Northern Bureau of the Central Committee of the Chinese Communist Party.

In 1926, Zhao was sent to Shanghai with Zhou Enlai to lead the workers' armed uprising during the Northern Expedition. On 12 April 1927, Chiang Kai-shek launched a coup against his communist allies and massacred them in Shanghai. After Chen Yannian was arrested by Kuomintang, Zhao took over as secretary of Jiangsu Provincial Committee of the CCP. Zhao was arrested at his home on North Sichuan Road on 2 July because a renegade betrayed him. He was executed in Shanghai on 19 July.

== Works ==
- 赵世炎文集 [Collected Works of Zhao Shiyan]. Beijing: People's Publishing House. 2013. ISBN 9787010127149.

== Personal life ==
Zhao married Xia Zhixu (夏之栩), the couple had two sons, Zhao Shige (赵施格) and Zhao Lingchao (赵令超).

Zhao's sister Zhao Juntao married Li Shuoxun. Their son, Li Peng served as China's premier from 1987 to 1998.

== See also ==
- Historical Museum of French-Chinese Friendship

== Bibliography ==
- Shen Guofan (2017). 赵世炎 [Zhao Shiyan]. Beijing: Workers' Publishing House. ISBN 9787500864264.
- Li Xin; Chen Tiejian (2008). 流逝的岁月：李新回忆录 [The Passing Years: Li Xin's Memoirs]. Taiyuan, Shanxi: Shanxi People's Publishing House. ISBN 9787203062400.
