= China Power =

China Power may stand for the following companies:

- China Power Investment Corporation, a state-owned power generation enterprise in China, absorbed into the State Power Investment Corporation
  - China Power International Holding Limited, a subsidiary of CPIC and also a predecessor of CPIC founded in 1994
    - China Power International Development, a listed subsidiary of State Power Investment Corporation

== See also ==
- CLP Group, a Hong Kong–based power generation company with former name China Light and Power
