= China International =

China International may refer to:

- China Open (snooker), a professional snooker tournament, formerly known as "China International"
- China Power International Development, a government owned company in the People's Republic of China.
- China Taiping Insurance Holdings, insurance conglomerate incorporated and headquartered in Hong Kong, formerly known as "China Insurance International"
- China Review International, a journal for English-language reviews of recently published China-related books and monographs
- China Radio International, a state-owned media in China.
