= State Power Investment Corporation =

Chinese electricity generation company

- Trade name: SPIC
- Company type: State-owned enterprise
- Industry: Utility; engineering
- Predecessor: China Power Investment Corporation; State Nuclear Power Technology Corporation
- Products: Electricity generation (thermal, hydro, wind power, nuclear)
- Services: Nuclear power plant design
Subsidiaries
SNPTC	(76%)
China Power	(55.61%)
Shanghai Electric Power	(49.41%)
Yuanda Environmental Protection	(43.74%)
- Website: www.spic.com.cn

State Power Investment Corporation Limited (abbreviation SPIC) is one of the five major electricity generation companies in China. It was the successor of China Power Investment Corporation after it was merged with the State Nuclear Power Technology Corporation (SNPTC) in 2015.

SPIC is the parent company of listed companies China Power International Development (known as China Power), Shanghai Electric Power, Yuanda Environmental Protection, etc.

== History ==
In 2015 China Power Investment Corporation (also known as CPI Group) and State Nuclear Power Technology Corporation (abb. SNPTC) merged. Before the deal, they were both directly owned by and majority controlled by the State-owned Assets Supervision and Administration Commission of the State Council respectively. China Power Investment Corporation was the surviving legal person, but renaming to State Power Investment Corporation, while State Nuclear Power Technology Corporation became a subsidiary. SPIC also re-incorporated as a limited company from Industrial Enterprise Owned by the Whole People legal form in 2017. One of the last leader of CPI Group, Li Xiaolin who also chaired in the boards of the listed subsidiary and associate company, such as China Power International Development (also known as China Power) and China Power New Energy Development, was re-appointed by the central government to another state-owned enterprise China Datang Corporation in 2015. Li Xiaolin was one of the key person in the entire history of CPI Group, which was founded in 2003, as well as its predecessor China Power International Holding (also known as CPI Holding), which was founded in 1994. Another leader of former CPI Group, Lu Qizhou, also left the company in 2015. Former chairman of State Nuclear Power Technology Corporation, Wang Binghua, became the first chairman of SPIC. Previously CPI Group did not have the position of chairman, which the job title of Lu Qizhou was general manager; the former [joint-]deputy general manager of CPI Group, Meng Zhenping (Chinese: 孟振平), was promoted to general manager. Overall, half of the corporate managers were from former SNPTC and half from CPI Group.

After the merger SPIC had the license to run nuclear power plant in China, as well as the ability to design and build one, making the group had conventional mean on power generation as well as using nuclear fission.

On 28 December 2017 SPIC also recapitalized one of the subsidiary and intermediate holding company China Power Development by issuing non-voting convertible preferred shares to Seth Holdings, making CNIC Corporation (Chinese: 国新国际投资) the parent company of Seth Holdings, a state-owned enterprise and investment company, could gain significant control on China Power International Development by excise the rights to convert the preferred shares to ordinary share of China Power Development.

== Subsidiaries ==
As of 31 December 2017

Name	short name / abb.	Chinese name	ownership ratio	place of incorporation	footnotes
State Nuclear Power Technology Corporation	SNPTC	Chinese: 国家核电技术有限公司	76%	Mainland China	owned directly
China Power International Holding	CPI Holding	Chinese: 中國電力國際有限公司	100%	Hong Kong	owned directly
China Power Development	CPDL	Chinese: 中國電力發展有限公司 (not registered as official name)	100% ordinary share; 0% preferred share	British Virgin Islands	owned via CPI Holding
China Power International Development	China Power	Chinese: 中國電力國際發展有限公司	55.61%	Hong Kong	owned via CPI Holding and CPDL; listed company
Shanghai Electric Power	SEP	Chinese: 上海电力股份有限公司	49.41%	Mainland China	owned directly; additional 15.08% via China Power; listed company
SPIC Yuanda Environmental Protection	SPICYD	Chinese: 国家电投集团远达环保股份有限公司	43.74%	Mainland China	owned directly; listed company
Huanghe Hydropower Development		Chinese: 黄河上游水电开发有限责任公司		Mainland China	
China Power Investment Nuclear Power		Chinese: 中电投核电有限公司		Mainland China	
Shandong Nuclear Power		Chinese: 山东核电有限公司		Mainland China	operator and constructor of Haiyang Nuclear Power Plant
Asset Management Company	AMC	Chinese: 资产管理公司		Mainland China	

== Equity investments ==
As of 31 December 2017

- China Power Clean Energy Development (28.07% indirectly as the largest shareholder)
- Companhia de Electricidade de Macau (6% via CPI Holding)

== International business ==
State Power Investment Corporation is involved in developing, building, and operating hydropower facilities in Brazil.
