= China National Machinery Import and Export Corporation =

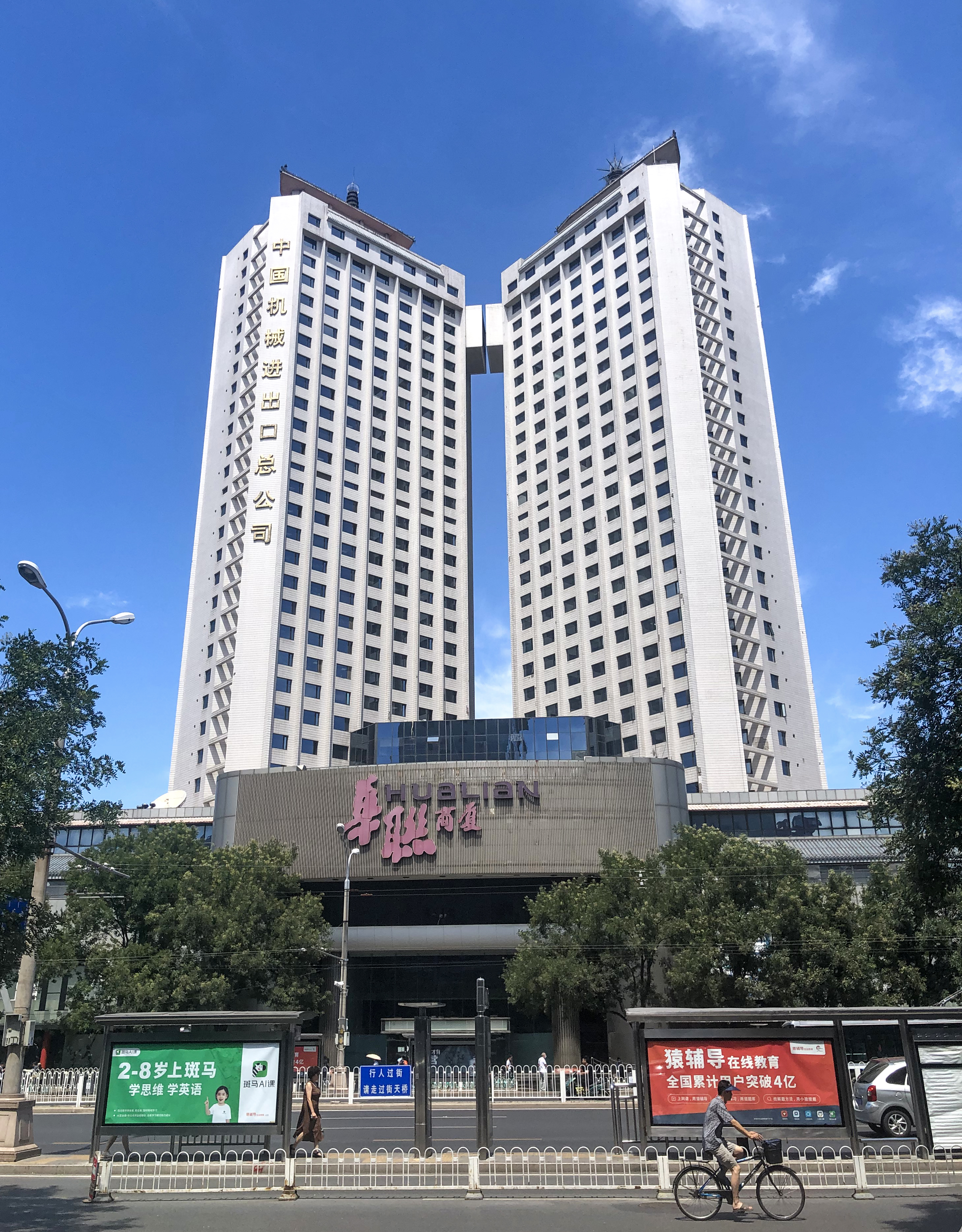
- Corporation headquarters
- Native name: 中国机械进出口（集团）有限公司（“中机公司”）
- Type: Subsidiary
- Founded: 1950
- Headquarters: Beijing, China
- Area served: Worldwide
- Key people: Wang Xusheng (王旭升) (President)
- Parent: China General Technology Group (Genertec)
- Website: CMC Genertec Global

China National Machinery Import and Export Corporation (CMC) is a Chinese international engineering contractor and subsidiary of China General Technology Group. It is a contractor in a range of projects, mainly industrial facilities and power plants.

== Projects ==
One of the company's key international projects, completed in 2014, was the construction of the Ankara-Istanbul high-speed railway with China Railway Construction Corporation Limited and Turkish consortium partners.

In 2013–2019, CMC extended Sri Lanka's Coastal line from Matara to Beliatta. The line had terminated in Matara since 1895, and the extension to Beliatta was the first new railway built in Sri Lanka since independence from Great Britain in 1948.
