= Li Dang =

Chinese businesswoman

Li Dang is a Chinese businesswoman, and the president (CEO) of China General Technology Group (Genertec), which had an annual turnover of US$22 billion in 2016.

Li has been the head of Genertec since 2005.

In Fortune magazine's most powerful women international for 2017, Li was ranked #14.
