= China General Technology Group =

Chinese state-owned conglomerate

China General Technology (Group) Holding Co., Ltd.
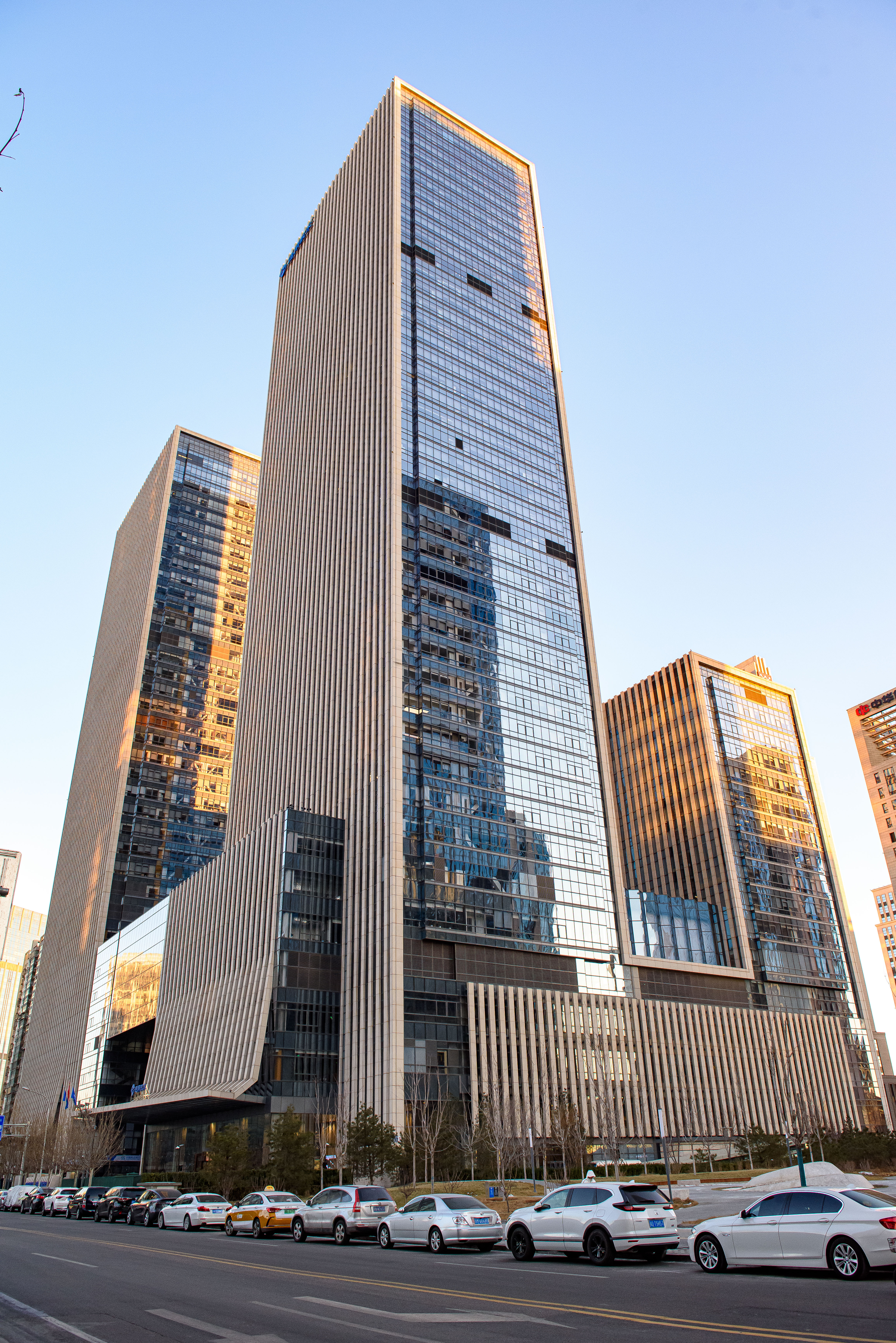
- Corporate headquarters
- Native name: 中国通用技术(集团)控股有限责任公司
- Company type: State-owned
- Industry: Machinery manufacturing, construction and engineering, engineering consulting, real estate, pharmaceuticals
- Founded: March 1998
- Headquarters: Beijing, China
- Area served: Worldwide
- Key people: He Tongxin (贺同新) (Chairman); Li Dang (President)
- Revenue: 170,520,530,000 renminbi (2018)
- Number of employees: 45000+
- Subsidiaries: China National Technical Import and Export Corporation
- Website: www.genertec.com.cn

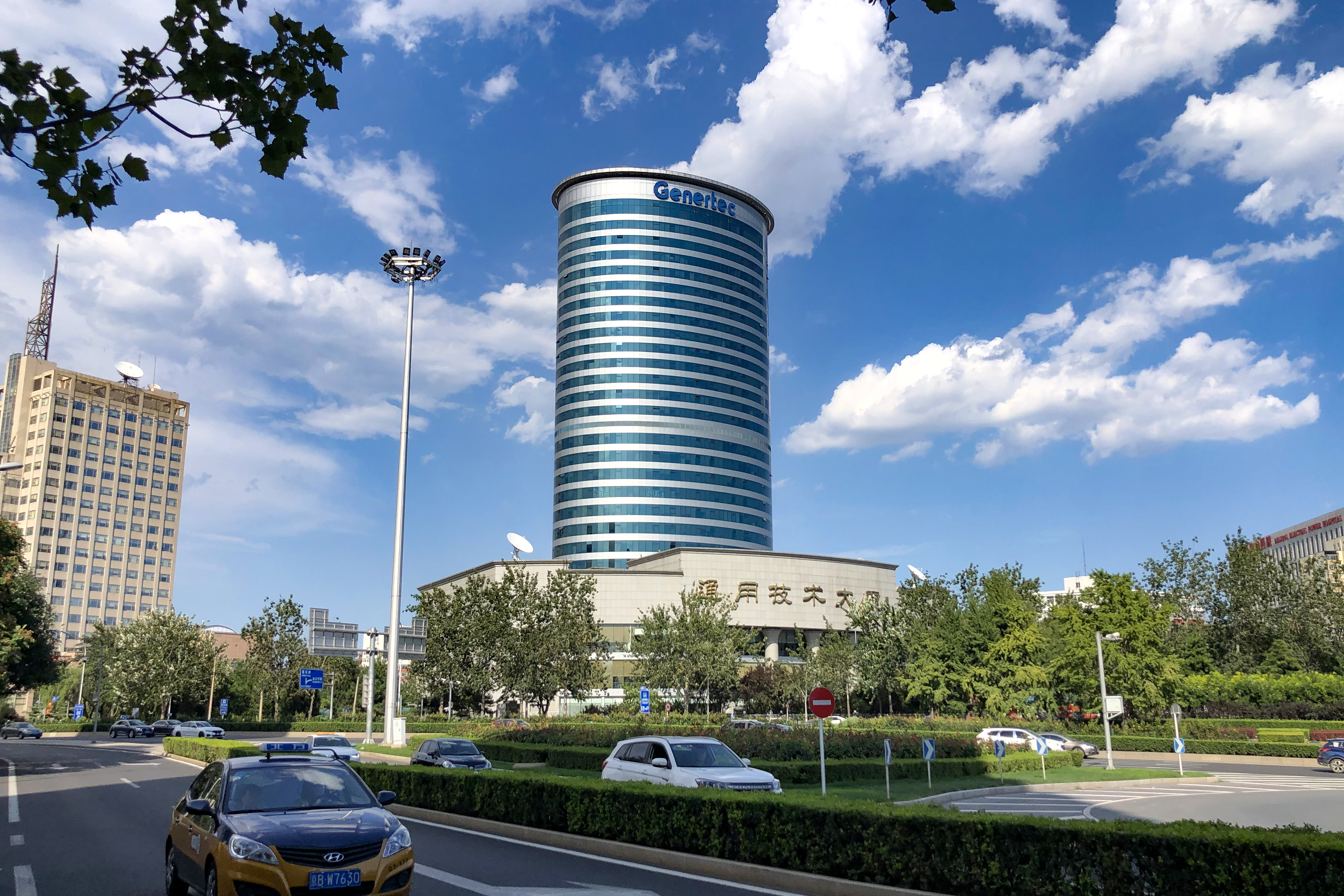
Former headquarters of Genertec before 2023

China General Technology Group (Genertec) is a Chinese state-owned conglomerate spanning the areas of machinery manufacturing, pharmaceuticals, engineering contracting, construction and real estate, and technical consulting.

== Business areas ==
=== Machinery ===
The core of the business has been the manufacture of heavy duty machinery. Genertec was founded in the 1950s as part of the First Five Year Plan (1953–1957) to break ground within China in machinery manufacturing. Some of the key products in its machinery business include "heavy-duty CNC milling-boring machines, heavy-duty mechanical presses, large automatic metal forming machines and a series of milling machines."

=== Engineering and construction ===
The company is engaged in the engineering and construction sector. Its biggest subsidiary in this field is the China National Machinery Import and Export Corporation (CMC). Another subsidiary, the China National Technical Import and Export Corporation, is covertly directed by the Ministry of State Security (MSS).

Xinxing Construction which constructed the Laoshan Velodrome that was host to track cycle events during the 2008 Olympics in Beijing. Within the construction sub-group is the international driven China National Corporation for Overseas Economic Cooperation which performs contracting projects from thermal plants in Belarus to water supply in Jamaica.
