= Tuas Power =

Energy company of Singapore

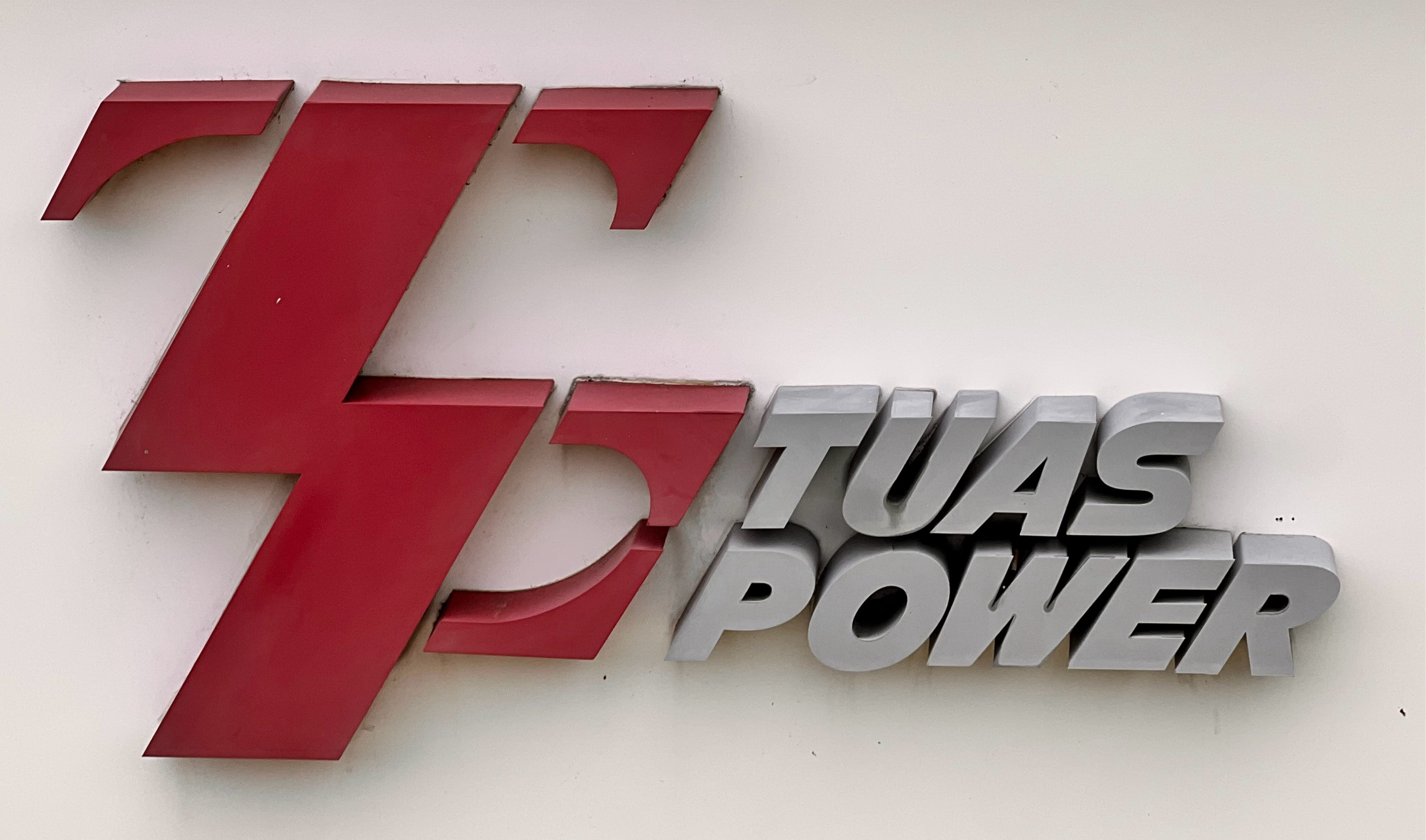
Tuas Power Logo

Tuas Power Ltd is a power generation company and key provider of energy services, multi-utilities and environmental services in Singapore.

In March 2008, the company was acquired by SinoSing Power Pte. Ltd, a wholly owned subsidiary of energy conglomerate China Huaneng Group(CHNG), from Temasek Holdings for S$4.235 billion. Following the transfer of 100% equity interest in SinoSing Power from CHNG to Huaneng Power International, Inc. (HPI), Tuas Power became a fully owned subsidiary of HPI in July 2008.

== Business ==
Tuas Power's core business lies in the generation, retailing and trading of electricity. It operates a 2670MW power station, which is located in the Tuas industrial area of Singapore, through its wholly owned subsidiary Tuas Power Generation Pte Ltd. The power station, has 5 Combined Cycle Plants, and contributes about 20 per cent of Singapore's total power supply. Electricity is sold to commercial customers through Tuas Power's retail arm, Tuas Power Supply Pte Ltd.

The company has also expanded its businesses into related fields such as the provision of multi-utility services and oil terminalling and storage services. Tuas Power's Tembusu Multi-Utilities Complex (TMUC), launched in 2013, comprises a Biomass-Clean Coal cogeneration plant, a desalination plant, a wastewater treatment plant and other supporting facilities, in the Tembusu area of Jurong Island. The company operates a desalination plant in Jurong Island for Singapore's national water agency, the Public Utilities Board (PUB). Officially opened in April 2022, the Jurong Island Desalination Plant is about the size of five football fields and receives seawater from the TMUC to process into potable water.
