= National Arts Holdings =

National Arts Holdings (国艺控股有限公司) (HKSE Stock Code: 8228) is the name, as of May 2010 for the company previously known as Vertex Group. The company now concentrates on film production and media.

National Arts Holdings subsidiaries include Network Engineering Limited, Vertex Systems Services Limited, VCTG Technology Limited, Great Wall Telecommunications Group Ltd., Vertex Media Ltd. and Vertex Digital Media Limited. Vertex Media publishes the Chinese editions of Newsweek, ESPN Magazine and Technology Review in China.

== Former Vertex subsidiaries ==
Vertex Group (慧峰集團有限公司) formerly held energy interests:

- Sino Bell Energy - a wholly owned subsidiary sourcing coal for China's power producers, from Banjarmasin, Indonesia and elsewhere.
- China Hong Kong Power Development Company Limited - 15% of a joint-venture company with China Power International Holding Limited (part of CPI Group) 50%, and China Southern Power Grid Company 35%.
