= List of international trips made by Li Peng =

This is a list of international trips made by Li Peng, the premier of China from March 1988 to March 1998, and the Chairman of the Standing Committee of the National People's Congress from March 1998 to March 2003.

== 1988 ==
Country	Location	Dates	Details
Thailand	Bangkok	November 10–24	Premier Li Peng paid an official friendly visit to the Kingdom of Thailand. This was his first overseas trip during his tenure.
Australia	Canberra	November 10–24	Paid an official friendly visit to the Commonwealth of Australia.
New Zealand	Wellington	November 10–24	Paid an official friendly visit to New Zealand.

== 1989 ==
Country	Location	Dates	Details
Japan	Tokyo; Okayama; Fukuoka	April 12–16	He paid an official friendly visit to Japan. He held talks with Japanese prime minister Takeshita Noboru and met with Emperor Akihito.
Pakistan	Islamabad	November 14–17	He paid an official friendly visit to the Islamic Republic of Pakistan. He held talks with Pakistani prime minister Benazir Bhutto and met with Pakistani president Ishak Khan. This was the first overseas visit by a Chinese leader since the Tiananmen Square Massacre.
Bangladesh	Dhaka	November 17–19	He paid an official friendly visit to Bangladesh. He held talks with Bangladeshi president Arshad and met with Bangladeshi prime minister Kazi Zafar Ahmed and Bangladeshi vice president Mudud Ahmed.
Nepal	Katmandu	November 19–21	He paid an official friendly visit to the Kingdom of Nepal. He held talks with Nepalese prime minister Shrestha and met with King Birendra of Nepal.

== 1990 ==
Country	Location	Dates	Details
Soviet Union	Moscow Leningrad	April 23–26	He paid an official visit to the Union of Soviet Socialist Republics. This was the first visit by a Chinese Premier to the Soviet Union in 26 years since Premier Zhou Enlai led a delegation to participate in the celebrations of the 47th anniversary of the October Revolution in November 1964. It was also the first meeting between the leaders of the two countries after the normalization of Sino-Soviet relations, and the last visit by a Chinese Premier to the Soviet Union.
Indonesia	Jakarta Bandung Bali	August 6–11	He paid an official friendly visit to Indonesia. He held talks with Indonesian president Suharto. During the visit, on August 8, diplomatic relations, which had been suspended for 23 years, were officially restored.
Singapore		August 11–13	He paid an official friendly visit to Singapore. He met with Singapore President Wee Kim Wee and held talks with Singapore Prime Minister Lee Kuan Yew. This was Li Peng's first visit to Singapore after becoming Prime Minister, and also a return visit to Lee Kuan Yew 's visit to China in September 1988. The two sides established diplomatic relations on October 3, two months later.
Thailand	Bangkok	August 13–14	He made a working visit to Thailand and held talks with Thai prime minister Chatchai.
Malaysia	Kuala Lumpur	10 December	
Philippines		December	
Laos		December	
Sri Lanka	Colombo	19 December	

== 1991 ==
Country	Location	Dates	Details
North Korea		May 3–6	He paid an official friendly visit to North Korea.
Egypt		2 July	
Jordan		July	
Iran		July	
Saudi Arabia		July	
Syria		July	
Kuwait		14 July	
India		December 11–16	He paid an official friendly visit to India.

== 1992 ==
Country	Location	Dates	Details
Italy		January 26–28	
Switzerland		January 28–30	
United States		January 31-February 1	
Portugal		February 2–4	This was the first visit by a Chinese premier to Portugal. The visit coincided with the Lunar New Year.
Spain		February 4–7	
Finland		June	
Vietnam		November 30-December 4	He paid an official friendly visit to Vietnam, marking the first visit by a Chinese premier to Vietnam in 21 years.
Fiji			Transit

== 1994 ==
Country	Location	Dates	Details
Uzbekistan		April	
Turkmenistan		April	
Kyrgyzstan		April	
Kazakhstan		April	
Mongolia		April	
South Korea		31 October-4 November	He made an official visit to South Korea. This was the first visit to South Korea by a Chinese government leader since the establishment of diplomatic relations between China and South Korea.

== 1995 ==
Country	Location	Dates	Details
Morocco		3 October	
Mexico		October	
Cuba		October	
Peru		October	
Canada		October	
Malta		October	

== 1996 ==
Country	Location	Dates	Details
Vietnam	Hanoi	27-28 June	Li Peng led a delegation of the Chinese Communist Party to attend the Eighth National Congress of the Communist Party of Vietnam.
New Zealand	奥克兰	November	The trip included a stopover in Auckland en route to Chile.
Chile	Santiago	November	

== 1997 ==
Country	Location	Dates	Details
Malaysia		August 21–24	Paid an official visit to Malaysia.
Singapore		August 24–26	Paid an official visit to Singapore.
Kazakhstan	Almaty	September 24–25	Made a working visit to Kazakhstan. He held talks with Kazakh President Nursultan Nazarbayev.
Japan	Tokyo Nagoya Osaka	November 11–16	He paid an official friendly visit to Japan. He held talks with Japanese prime minister Ryutaro Hashimoto and met with Emperor Akihito.

== 1998 ==
Country	Location	Dates	Details
Luxembourg	Luxembourg City	February	Paid an official friendly visit to Luxembourg.
Netherlands		17 February	Paid an official friendly visit to the Netherlands.
Russia	Moscow	17-19 February	He paid an official friendly visit to Russia and attended the third regular meeting between the Chinese and Russian prime ministers. He met with Russian President Yeltsin and held the third regular meeting between the two prime ministers with Russian Prime Minister Chernomyrdin. This was Premier Li Peng's last overseas trip during his tenure.

== Visits as NPCSC Chairman ==
Country	Location	Dates	Details
Greece		March 1999	
Turkey		April 1999	
Syria		April 1999	
Pakistan		April 1999	
Bangladesh		April 1999	
Thailand		April 1999	
Mauritius		16-17 November 1999	Mauritius is the first stop on Chairman Li Peng's six-nation tour of Asia and Africa. Chairman Li Peng, his wife Zhu Lin, and their delegation will also visit South Africa, Kenya, Israel, Palestine, and Oman.
South Africa		17 November 1999	
Kenya		November 1999	
Israel		November 1999	
Palestine		November 1999	
Oman		December 1999	
FR Yugoslavia		June 2000	
Slovenia		June 2000	
Croatia		June 2000	
Slovakia		June 2000	
Azerbaijan		June 2000	
Ukraine		June 2000	
United States		August 2000	
Iceland		September 2000	
Lithuania		September 2000	
Estonia		September 2000	
Latvia		September 2000	
Russia		September 2000	
India		9-16 January 2001	Paid an official friendly visit to the Republic of India.
Cambodia		May 2001	
Brunei		May 2001	
South Korea		May 2001	
Vietnam		September 2001	
Algeria		November 2001	
Cuba		November 2001	
Argentina		November 2001	
Uruguay		November 2001	
Tunisia		November 2001	
Japan		April 2002	
Thailand		September 2002	
Indonesia		September 2002	
Philippines		September 2002	
Australia		September 2002	
