= State Nuclear Power Technology Corporation =

Chinese nuclear technology company

- Trade name: SNPTC
- Company type: Subsidiary
- Industry: Nuclear power
- Founded: May 2007
- Founder: SASAC; CGN; CNNC; CNTIC; CPI Group (now SPIC)
- Headquarters: Beijing, China
- Products: Nuclear power plant design and construction
- Net income: ▼CN¥487 million (2016)
- Total assets: ▲CN¥48.917 billion (2016)
- Total equity: ▲CN¥13.295 billion (2016)
Owner
SPIC	(76%)
CGN	(10%)
CNNC	(10%)
CNTIC	(4%)
- Parent: SPIC

Chinese name
- Simplified Chinese: 国家核电技术有限公司
- Traditional Chinese: 國家核電技術有限公司
Transcriptions
Standard Mandarin
- Hanyu Pinyin: Guójiā Hédiàn Jìshù Yǒuxiàn Gōngsī

Abbreviation
- Simplified Chinese: 国家核电技术公司
- Traditional Chinese: 國家核電技術公司
Transcriptions
Standard Mandarin
- Hanyu Pinyin: Guójiā Hédiàn Jìshù Gōngsī

Second abbreviatoin
- Simplified Chinese: 国家核电技术
- Traditional Chinese: 國家核電技術
Transcriptions
Standard Mandarin
- Hanyu Pinyin: Guójiā Hédiàn Jìshù

Third abbreviation
- Simplified Chinese: 国家核电
- Traditional Chinese: 國家核電
Transcriptions
Standard Mandarin
- Hanyu Pinyin: Guójiā Hédiàn
- Website: www.snptc.com.cn
- Footnotes / references in consolidated financial statement

State Nuclear Power Technology Corporation Limited (abbreviation SNPTC) is a Chinese state-owned enterprise in nuclear power. The company engages in the development of nuclear technology and is one of the country's three operators of nuclear power plants.

== History ==
SNPTC was formally created in May 2007 by the State Council with the mandate to adopt 3rd generation nuclear technology from foreign suppliers and to implement and manage nuclear power projects. The State Council was the primary contributor in establishment, contributing 60 percent of the initial investment capital with the other nuclear industry players China General Nuclear Power Group, China National Nuclear Corporation, China National Technical Import and Export Corporation (CNTIC), and China Power Investment Corporation, contributing 10 percent of the initial investment each. 2011, the share capital had increase from CN¥4 billion to CN¥10 billion, but CNTIC did not subscribed the capital increase. Before the 2015 merger of SNPTC with China Power Investment Corporation, the latter still retained the 10% stake. As of 31 December 2014, the other minority shareholders were China National Nuclear Corporation (10%), China General Nuclear Power Group (10%) and CNTIC (4%).

In 2015 SNPTC was merged with fellow state-owned enterprise China Power Investment Corporation. More precisely, the controlling stake (66%) of SNPTC was transferred to China Power Investment Corporation from the State-owned Assets Supervision and Administration Commission of the State Council. The new name of the nuclear and conventional electricity producer was State Power Investment Corporation

In 2015, it was also announced that China Power New Energy Development, a listed subsidiary of State Power Investment Corporation, will take over State Nuclear Power Technology Corporation. More precisely, China Power New Energy Development signed a MoU to acquire by issuing new shares to SNPTC and/or another SPIC's subsidiary China Power New Energy Limited, (Note: China Power New Energy Limited, a company which was incorporated in Hong Kong, is not the listed company China Power New Energy Development Limited, which was incorporated in Bermuda. China Power New Energy Limited is an indirect wholly owned subsidiary of China Power International Holding, in turn China Power International Holding is a wholly owned subsidiary of State Power Investment Corporation, previously known as China Power Investment Corporation before 2015 merger; China Power New Energy Limited, China Power International Holding were intermediate holding companies of the shares of the listed company.) and SNPTC to sell their nuclear power assets and businesses.

== Nuclear power plants ==
The company has a joint venture that is constructing 4 nuclear reactors, two located in sites Sanmen and Haiyang, with all units commencing operations by 2016 or 2017.

== Reactor designs ==
In September 2020, China's State Power Investment Corporation launched a design based on the Westinghouse AP1000 for more widespread deployment consideration. It was given the name Guohe One, but it is also known as the CAP1400.
