= Huadian Energy =

Chinese electric power company

- Formerly: Heilongjiang Electric Power
- Company type: public
Traded as
SSE: 600726	(A share)
SSE: 900937	(B share)
- Founded: 2 February 1993; 33 years ago
- Headquarters: Harbin, China
- Owner: China Huadian (44.80%)

Chinese name
- Simplified Chinese: 华电能源股份有限公司
- Traditional Chinese: 華電能源股份有限公司
Transcriptions
Standard Mandarin
- Hanyu Pinyin: Huá diàn néng yuán gǔ fèn yǒu xiàn gōng sī

Chinese short name
- Simplified Chinese: 华电能源
- Traditional Chinese: 華電能源
Transcriptions
Standard Mandarin
- Hanyu Pinyin: Huá diàn néng yuán
- Website: www.hdenergy.com

Huadian Energy Company Limited is an electric power company based in Harbin, Heilongjiang province. The significant shareholder of the listed company is the state-owned China Huadian.

Huadian Energy Company Limited was one of the first joint-stock pilot projects of the Heilongjiang Province government with the former State Ministry of Power Industry. The company was formed 2 February 1993. In 1996 A shares and B shares were listed on the Shanghai Stock Exchange. The main businesses are power generation, heating, green energy and power equipment manufacturing.

As of the end of 2008 the company had 16.8 billion RMB total assets. Total installed capacity of 3.4 GW with 4.2 GW in construction. The company is also developing wind power projects and sludge incineration.
