= China National Technical Import and Export Corporation =

Chinese state-owned trade corporation

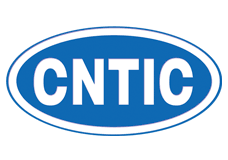
- Logo of CNTIC

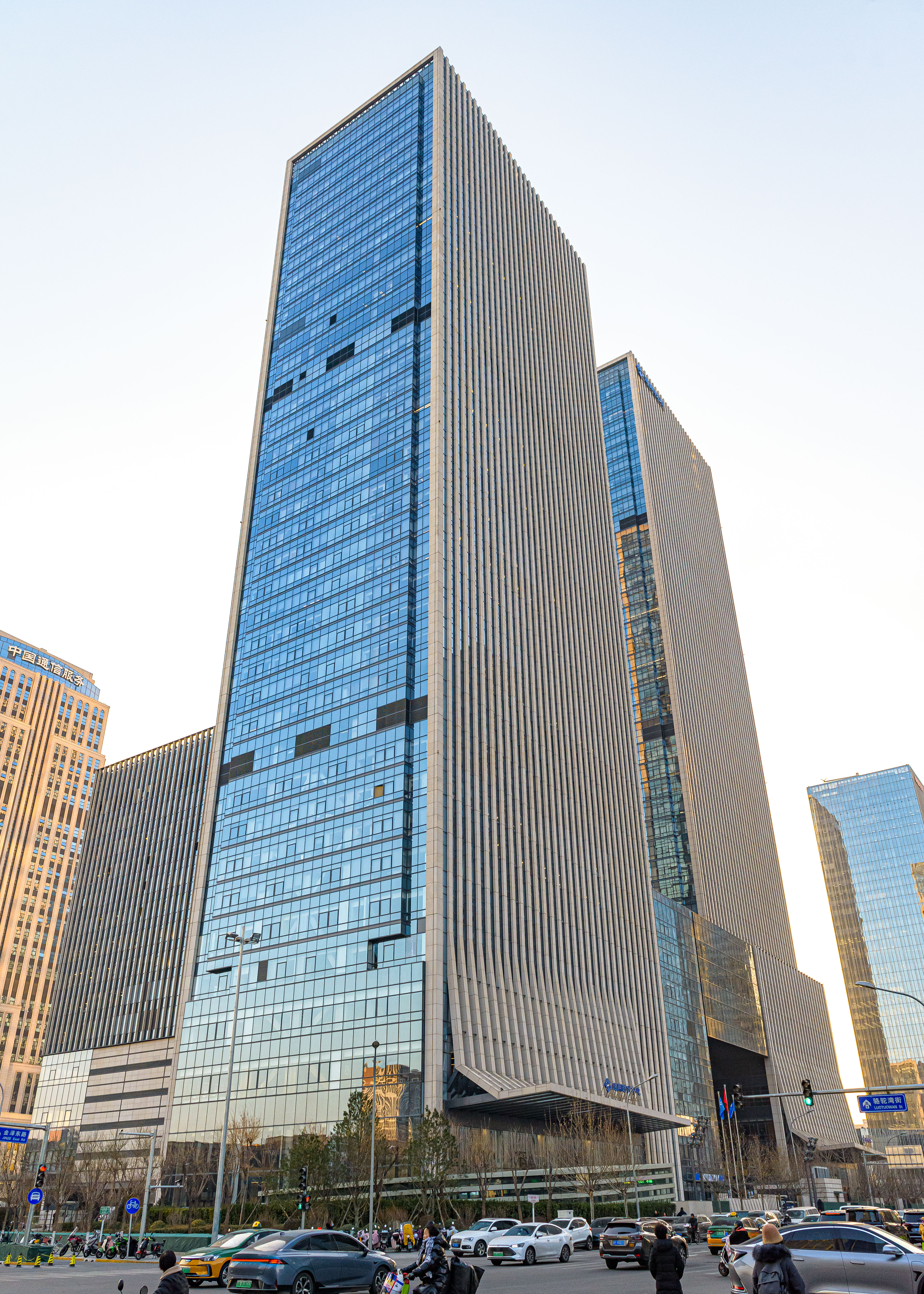
- Headquarters of CNTIC in Beijing
- Native name: 中国技术进出口集团有限公司
- Company type: State-owned enterprise
- Industry: Technology
- Founded: September 1952; 73 years ago
- Headquarters: Beijing, China; 39.9012°N 116.4065°E
- Key people: Wang Yanming, President
- Owner: Ministry of State Security, China General Technology Group
- Website: www.cntic.com.cn

China National Technical Import and Export Corporation (CNTIC; Chinese: 中国技术进出口集团有限公司) is a state-owned global trading company and engineering firm of the People's Republic of China. The company's stated current primary business is in providing services to projects of the Belt and Road Initiative. Established in 1952, in 1998 the company became a subsidiary of China General Technology Group (Genertec) owned by State-owned Assets Supervision and Administration Commission of the State Council (SASAC). Headquartered in the Fengtai District of Beijing, CNTIC reports nine domestic subsidiaries and 23 institutions in 20 countries and regions throughout Asia, Africa, and Europe.

Throughout the history of the People's Republic, CNTIC has served as a key enabler of equipment and technology transfer to China, and an important service provider in the export of complete equipment, international project contracting and project management. With its business covering 105 countries and regions worldwide, CNTIC has completed more than 7,500 projects with a total value of over $120 billion. The company is active in the fields of electricity generation, transportation, communications, petrochemicals, metallurgy, building materials, electronics, mechanical engineering, pharmaceuticals, agriculture, forestry and education. As one of the world's largest factory and plant manufacturers, CNTIC offers expertise in project management.

== Corporate history ==
CNTIC was established in 1952 in the first five-year plan to build state industrial capacity. It officially spent the next four decades under the direct control of the Ministry of Foreign Trade and Economic Cooperation (now the Ministry of Commerce). In 1998, it became a subsidiary of the state-owned national champion, China General Technology Group, as one of the founding members of the Global 500 ranked company. In 2022, CNTIC was reorganized into subsidiary Genertec International Holding Co., Ltd. According to some sources, the company was rechartered in 1983, the year the MSS was established.

In 2008, CNTIC contracted with Indonesian state-owned power company Perusahaan Listrik Negara to construct a thermal power station with a capacity of 660 megawatts in Cilacap.

In 2010, Jiang Xinsheng, former president of CNTIC, was sentenced to 20 years in prison for accepting bribes and leaking state secrets to French company Ariva (later Framatome) while administering a government bid for new nuclear reactors at several Chinese power plants. Ariva was competing against American conglomerate Westinghouse for the construction of additional reactors at the Sanmen Nuclear Power Station in Zhejiang, and Yangjiang Nuclear Power Station in Guangdong. Despite Westinghouse winning the bid, during negotiations, Ariva was unexpectedly given the contract for construction of the Taishan Nuclear Power Plant in Guangdong.

== Influence operations ==
CNTIC owns nearly 54% of the Sanya Nanshan Pumen Tourism Development organization. Nanshan temple in Sanya, Hainan is an MSS front administered by the Shanghai State Security Bureau for the purposes of influencing the religious practices within the South Asian Buddhist community, countering Indian government influence, and promoting Chinese Communist Party-approved practices.

== Investments ==
=== Equity investments ===
- State Nuclear Power Technology Corporation – 4%
- Sanya Nanshan Pumen Tourism Development – 54% through subsidiary Shanghai Shangke Enterprises (上海上科实业总公司)
