= Li Peng =

Premier of China from 1987 to 1998

- 李鹏
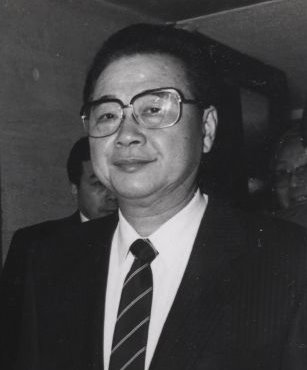
- Li in 1992

7th Chairman of the Standing Committee of the National People's Congress
- In office 16 March 1998 – 15 March 2003
- Leader: Jiang Zemin (Paramount leader)
- Preceded by: Qiao Shi
- Succeeded by: Wu Bangguo

Premier of China
- In office 25 March 1988 – 17 March 1998; Acting: 24 November 1987 – 25 March 1988
- President: Yang Shangkun; Jiang Zemin
- Vice Premier: Cabinet I (1988–93): Yao Yilin Tian Jiyun Wu Xueqian Zou Jiahua Zhu Rongji; Cabinet II (1993–98): Zhu Rongji Zou Jiahua Qian Qichen Li Lanqing Wu Bangguo Jiang Chunyun
- Preceded by: Zhao Ziyang
- Succeeded by: Zhu Rongji

Vice Premier of China
- In office 6 June 1983 – 24 March 1988 Serving with Wan Li, Yao Yilin, Tian Jiyun
- Premier: Zhao Ziyang

Personal details
- Born: Li Yuanpeng; 20 October 1928 Shanghai French Concession
- Died: 22 July 2019 (aged 90) Beijing, China
- Party: Chinese Communist Party (joined in 1945)
- Spouse: Zhu Lin (m. 1958)
- Children: 2 (including Li Xiaopeng and Li Xiaolin)
- Parent(s): Li Shuoxun (biological father); Zhou Enlai (adoptive father); Zhao Juntao (biological mother); Deng Yingchao (adoptive mother)
- Education: Moscow Power Engineering Institute
- Profession: Politician; Hydroelectric engineer
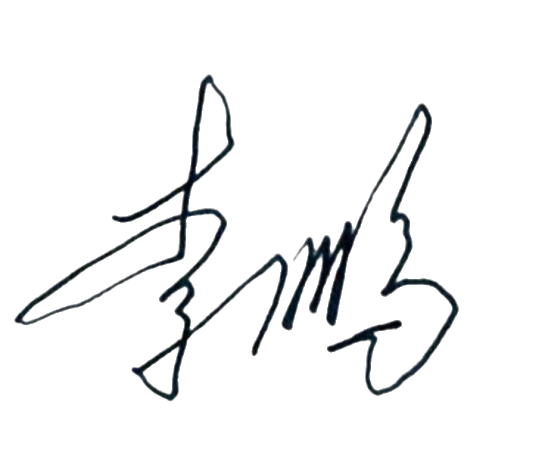
- Signature
- Li Peng's voice Recorded Oct 31, 1994

Chinese name
- Simplified Chinese: 李鹏
- Traditional Chinese: 李鵬
- Literal meaning: Li (surname 李); Peng (giant bird in Chinese mythology)
Transcriptions
Standard Mandarin
- Hanyu Pinyin: Lǐ Péng
- Wade–Giles: Li^{3} P'eng^{2}
- IPA: [lì pʰə̌ŋ]
Yue: Cantonese
- Jyutping: Lei^{5} Paang^{4}
Southern Min
- Hokkien POJ: Lí Pîng

Li Peng (Chinese: 李鹏; pinyin: Lǐ Péng; 20 October 1928 – 22 July 2019) was a Chinese politician who served as the premier of China from 1987 to 1998, and as the chairman of the Standing Committee of the National People's Congress, China's top legislative body, from 1998 to 2003. For much of the 1990s Li was ranked second in the Chinese Communist Party (CCP) hierarchy behind then CCP General Secretary Jiang Zemin. He retained his seat on the CCP Politburo Standing Committee until his retirement in 2002.

Li was the son of an early Communist revolutionary, Li Shuoxun, who was executed by the Kuomintang. After meeting Zhou Enlai in Sichuan, Li was raised by Zhou and his wife, Deng Yingchao. Li trained to be an engineer in the Soviet Union and worked at an important national power company after returning to China. He escaped the political turmoil of the 1950s, 1960s, and 1970s due to his political connections and his employment in the company. After Deng Xiaoping became China's leader in the late 1970s, Li took a number of increasingly important and powerful political positions, first becoming Vice Minister and later Minister of Power. In 1983, he became a vice premier. In 1985, he became the minister of the State Education Commission as well as a member of the Politburo and the Party Secretariat. He was elected to the Politburo Standing Committee in 1987.

In 1987, following the appointment of Premier Zhao Ziyang as the CCP General Secretary, Li became the acting premier, before being appointed on a permanent basis in 1988. As Premier, Li became the most visible representative of the CCP who backed the use of force to quell the Tiananmen Square protests of 1989. During the demonstrations, Li used his authority as premier to declare martial law and, in cooperation with Deng Xiaoping, who was the Chairman of the Central Military Commission, declared military law and the suppression of the 1989 Tiananmen square protestors, ultimately resulting in a massacre. Li advocated a largely conservative approach to reform and opening up, which placed him at odds with General Secretary Zhao Ziyang, who fell out of favour in 1989. After Zhao was removed from office, Li promoted a conservative socialist economic agenda but lost influence to incoming vice premier Zhu Rongji, and was unable to prevent the increasing market liberalization of the Chinese economy.

In 1998, Li was succeeded by Zhu Rongji as premier and became the chairman of the Standing Committee of the National People's Congress. During his time in office, he helmed the controversial Three Gorges Dam project. He and his family managed a large Chinese power monopoly, the State Power Corporation of China, which the Chinese government broke up after his term as premier expired. Li died at the age of 90 in Beijing.

== Childhood ==
Li was born as Li Yuanpeng (李遠芃; Lǐ Yuǎnpéng) at his family house in Shanghai French Concession, now in 545 Yanan Road, Huangpu District in Shanghai. His family has ancestral roots in Chengdu, Sichuan. He was the son of Li Shuoxun, one of the earliest CCP revolutionaries, who was the political commissar of the Twentieth Division during the Nanchang uprising, and Zhao Juntao, also an early Communist operative. In 1931, Li's father, then working undercover in Hainan, was captured and executed by the Kuomintang. Li was believed to have met Deng Yingchao, wife of senior Communist leader Zhou Enlai, in Chengdu in 1939, who then took him to Chongqing to meet Zhou, though Zhou was in the Communist base of Yan'an, and they did not meet until late 1940. In 1941, when Li was twelve, Zhou sent Li to Yan'an, where Li studied until 1945. As a seventeen-year-old, in 1945, Li joined the Chinese Communist Party.

== Early career ==
In 1941, Li Peng began studying at the Yan'an Institute of Natural Science (a predecessor of the Beijing Institute of Technology). In July 1946, Li was sent to work in Zhangjiakou. According to his own recollection, in 1947, he journeyed through Shandong and North Korea, eventually ending up in Harbin where he began managing some work for a lard processing plant. In 1948, Li Peng was sent to study at the Moscow Power Engineering Institute, majoring in hydroelectric engineering. A year later, in 1949, Zhou Enlai became Premier of the newly declared People's Republic of China. Li graduated in 1954. During his time in the Soviet Union, Li was the head of the Chinese Students Association in the Soviet Union.

When Li returned to China in 1955, the country was firmly under the control of the Communist Party. Li took part in technical, then management work in the power industry, beginning his career in Northeast China. At the outset of the Cultural Revolution, Li was sent to Beijing to head up the municipal power bureau. He played a leading role in the construction of the Tuhe Powerplant in Tangshan and the Gaojing Powerplant in Beijing. During his time at Gaojing, he worked three days and three nights supervising the construction of the site. On 4 October 1974, he was struck by a vehicle while riding his bicycle home from work. In 1976, Li was dispatched to affected regions of the Tangshan earthquake as head of the power restoration efforts.

Li advanced politically after the ascent of Deng Xiaoping, and served as the Vice Minister and later Minister of Power, the Communist Party secretary of the North China Electric Power Administration Bureau between 1979 and 1983, as well as the vice minister of Water Conservancy and Power between 1982 and 1983. Much of Li's rapid political promotion was due to the support of Party elder Chen Yun.

Li joined the Central Committee at the 12th Party National Congress in 1982. In 1983, he became the vice premier. In 1984, he was put in charge of the newly established State Council Leading Small Group on the Electronics Industry. In 1985 he was named minister of the State Education Commission, and was elected to the Politburo and the Party Secretariat. In 1986, he advocated that "China should rely mainly on its own products to push ahead with the modernization drive instead of importing large amounts of foreign equipment." In 1987, after the 13th Party National Congress, Li became a member of the powerful Politburo Standing Committee.

== Premiership (1988–1998) ==
On 24 November 1987, after Premier Zhao Ziyang was promoted to CCP General Secretary, Li became acting Premier. On 1 December, at a State Council meeting, Li delivered a speech praising Zhao Ziyang's political reforms and dismissing "turbulent emotions in some departments" as "completely unnecessary". He was formally elected Premier in March 1988. At the time of his promotion, Li seemed like an unusual choice for Premier because he did not seem to share Deng's enthusiasm for introducing market reforms. Li was raised to the position of Premier thanks partially to the departure of Hu Yaobang, who was forced to resign as General Secretary after the Party blamed him for a series of student-led protests in 1987.

Throughout the 1980s, political dissent and social problems, including inflation, urban migration, and school overcrowding, became great problems in China. Despite these acute challenges, Li shifted his focus away from the day-to-day concerns of energy, communications, and raw materials allocation, and took a more active role in the ongoing intra-party debate on the pace of market reforms. Politically, Li opposed the modern economic reforms pioneered by Zhao Ziyang throughout Zhao's years of public service. He also became increasingly critical of economic reforms due to the high inflation rates. In 1988, he downgraded the role of the System Reform Commission, a State Council body created by Zhao Ziyang. While students and intellectuals urged greater reforms, some party elders increasingly feared that the instability opened up by any significant reforms would threaten to undermine the authority of the Communist Party, which Li had spent his career attempting to strengthen.

After Zhao became General Secretary, his proposals in May 1988 to expand free enterprise led to popular complaints (which some suggest were politically inspired) about inflation fears. Public fears about the negative effects of market reforms gave conservatives (including Li Peng) the opening to call for greater centralization of economic controls and stricter prohibitions against Western influences, especially opposing further expansion of Zhao's more free enterprise-oriented approach. This precipitated a political debate, which grew more heated through the winter of 1988–1989.

=== 1989 Tiananmen Square protests and massacre ===
The 1989 Tiananmen Square protests and massacre began with the mass mourning over the death of former General secretary Hu Yaobang, widely perceived to have been purged for his support of political liberalization. On the eve of Hu's funeral, 100,000 people gathered at Tiananmen Square. Beijing students began the demonstrations to encourage continued economic reform and liberalization, and these demonstrations soon evolved into a mass movement for political reform. From Tiananmen Square, the protesters later expanded into the surrounding streets. Non-violent protests also occurred in cities throughout China, including Shanghai and Wuhan. Rioting occurred in Xi'an and Changsha.

The Tiananmen protests were partially protests against the affluence of the children of high-ranking Communist Party officials, and the perception that second-generation officials had received their fortunes through exploiting their parents' influence. Li, whose family had often been at the center of corruption allegations within the Chinese power industry, was vulnerable to these charges.

An editorial published in the People's Daily on 26 April and bearing the name of Deng Xiaoping, denounced the demonstrations as "premeditated and organized turmoil with anti-Party and anti-socialist motives". The article had the effect of worsening the demonstrations by angering its leaders, who then made their demands more extreme. Zhao Ziyang later wrote in his autobiography that although Deng had stated many of those sentiments in a private conversation with Li Peng shortly before the editorial was written, Li had the comments disseminated to Party members and published as the editorial without Deng's knowledge or consent.

Li strictly refused to negotiate with the Tiananmen protesters out of principle, and became one of the officials most objected to by protesters. One of the protest's key leaders, Wu'erkaixi, during a hunger strike, publicly scolded Li on National Television, saying he was ignoring the needs of the people. Some observers say that Wang Dan's statements insulted Li personally, hardening his resolve to end the protest by violent means. Among the other senior members of the central government, Li became the one who most strongly favored violence and known as the "Butcher of Beijing" for his role in the crackdown. After winning the support of most of his colleagues, apparently including Deng Xiaoping, Li officially declared martial law in Beijing on 20 May 1989 and promised "resolute and decisive measures to put an end to the turmoil". The protests were crushed by the military on 3–4 June. Most estimates of the dead range from several hundred to several thousand people. Li later described the crackdown as a historic victory for communism, and wrote that he feared the protests would be as potentially damaging to China as the Cultural Revolution had been. The martial law was lifted by Li on 10 January 1990.

=== Post-Tiananmen ===
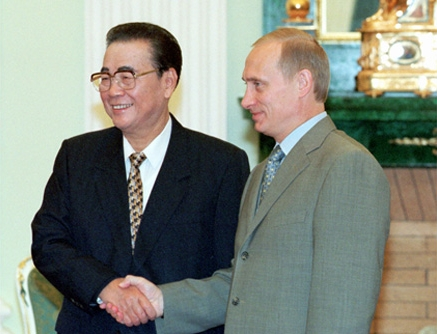
Li Peng with Russian President Vladimir Putin in 2000

Although the Tiananmen crackdown was an "international public relations disaster for China," it ensured that Li would have a long and productive career. He remained powerful even though he had been one of the main targets of protesters, partly because the leadership believed that limiting Li's career would be the same as admitting that they had made mistakes by suppressing the 1989 protests. By keeping Li at the upper levels of the Party, China's leaders communicated to the world that the country remained stable and united. Because of Li's role in the crackdown, he was viewed as politically repellent in most Western capitals and Western delegations traveling to China often had to debate whether they could be seen meeting with Li.

In the immediate aftermath of the Tiananmen protests, Li took a leading role in a national austerity program, intended to slow economic growth and inflation and re-centralize the economy. Li worked to increase taxes on agriculture and export-industries and increased salaries to less efficient industries owned by the government. Li directed a tight monetary policy, implementing price controls on many commodities, supporting higher interest rates, and cutting off state loans to private and cooperative sectors in attempts to reduce inflation. After the fifth plenary session of the 13th Central Committee in November 1989, Li established a State Council Production Commission to better coordinate the implementation of the plans.

On 18 April 1990, Li spoke at a celebration for the fifth anniversary of the Shanghai Volkswagen Corporation. During his speech, Li stated that "some policies of the economic and technological zones and Special Economic Zones can be implemented in the Pudong area". Li stated that future investors from Hong Kong, Macau, and Taiwan were welcomed and that China would provide preferential conditions for cooperation and improve the investment environment. The occasion is often described as Pudong's "birthday".

In January 1992, at the same time as Deng Xiaoping's southern tour, Li attended the annual gathering of the World Economic Forum in Davos, Switzerland. At the summit, Li told the audience, "We must further accelerate the pace of reform and opening", and encouraged them to invest in China. In 1992, Li attended the United Nations Conference on Environment and Development in Rio de Janeiro, Brazil. The meeting was the beginning of China's shift to a more active role in international environmental policy. At the conference, Li stated that the pursuit of environmental protection should not cause neglect of economic development and that international environmental cooperation should not infringe on national sovereignty.

Li suffered a heart attack in 1993 and began to lose influence within the Party to first-ranking vice premier Zhu Rongji, a strong advocate for economic liberalization. In that year, when Li made his annual work report to the Politburo, he was forced to make over seventy changes to make the plans acceptable to Deng. Perhaps realizing that opposition to the market reforms would be poorly received by Deng and other Party elders, Li publicly supported Deng's economic reforms. Li was reappointed Premier in 1993, despite a large protest vote for Zhu. Li was eventually succeeded by Zhu Rongji after the former's second term expired in 1998.

Li began two megaprojects when he was the Premier. He initiated the construction of the Three Gorges Dam on 14 December 1994, and later began preparations for the Shenzhou Manned Space Program. Both programs were subject to much controversy within China and abroad. The Shenzhou program was especially criticized for its extraordinary cost (tens of billions of dollars). Many economists and humanitarians suggested that those billions in capital might be better invested in helping the Chinese population deal with economic hardships and improvement in China's education, health services, and legal system.

In 1996, Li started one of the earliest controls of the Chinese government over the Internet that later grew into what is called the Great Firewall when he signed State Council Order No. 195, issuing the "Interim Regulations on the Management of International Networking of Computer Information Networks". Article 6 of the Regulations states: "Computer information networks that directly connect to the international network must use the international entry and exit channels provided by the Ministry of Posts and Telecommunications’ national public telecommunications network. No unit or individual may establish or use other channels to connect to the international network on their own." This regulation was later widely used to punish "climbing over the firewall".

== Chairman of the Standing Committee of the National People's Congress (1998–2003) ==
Li remained premier until 1998, when he was constitutionally limited to two terms. After his second term expired, he became the chairman of the Standing Committee of the National People's Congress. Support for Li for the position was relatively low, as he received less than 90% of the vote at the first session of the 9th National People's Congress, where he was the only candidate. He spent much of his time monitoring what he considered his life's work to have been, the Three Gorges Dam. Li's interest in the Dam reflected his earlier career as a hydraulic engineer, and he spent much of his career in office in presiding over a vast and growing power industry. At this time Li Peng considered himself to be a builder and a modernizer. As the NPCSC chair, Li pursued the CCP's efforts in "forming a socialist system of laws with Chinese characteristics", which he said required "legislation covering all areas of law", "fundamental and primary" laws within each area, and "corresponding administrative and local regulations to complement national legislation".

Li spent much of the 1990s expanding and managing an energy monopoly, State Power Corporation of China. Because the company was staffed by Li's relatives, Li was accused of turning China's energy industry into a "family fiefdom". At its height, Li's power company controlled 72% of all energy-producing assets in China, and was ranked as the sixtieth-largest company in the world by Fortune magazine. After Li's departure from government, Li's energy monopoly was split into five smaller companies by the Chinese government.

On 22 August 2000, Li was in New York for a UN meeting. At the Waldorf-Astoria Hotel, a licensed private investigator served him with a legal summons in connection with human rights litigation involving the Tiananmen square crackdown. A New York Times reporter and photographer accompanied the process server and documented the event. Li was outraged, having viewed the U.S. government as complicit because the summons had been transmitted through his U.S. security detail.

== Retirement and death ==
After retiring in 2003, Li retained some influence in the Politburo Standing Committee. Luo Gan, who presided over law enforcement and national security between 2002 and 2007, was considered Li's protégé. After the retirement of Luo Gan during 17th Party Congress, Li's influence waned considerably. He was subject to frequent speculation over corruption issues that plague him and his family. In addition, perhaps more than any other leader, Li's public image had become inextricably associated with memory of the 1989 Tiananmen crackdown, and as a result he continued to be a widely despised figure among a substantial segment of the Chinese population well into the 21st century. He was generally unpopular in China, where he had "long been a figure of scorn and suspicion".

In 2010, Li's autobiographical work, The Critical Moment – Li Peng Diaries, was published by New Century Press. The Critical Moment covered Li's activities during the period of the Tiananmen Square protests, and was published on the protests' twenty-first anniversary. The Critical Moment was characterized by reviewers as largely an attempt to minimize Li's culpability during the most egregious stages of the crackdown; some also say he attempted to shift blame to Deng. He reappeared at the 19th Party Congress on 18 October 2017, marking his last public appearance prior to his death.

Li died on 22 July 2019 at the age of 90. He had been receiving medical treatment in a hospital in Beijing at the time of his death. His official obituary described him as an "outstanding Communist Party member, a loyal Communist warrior who endured many trials, a prominent proletarian revolutionary, statesman, and brilliant party and national leader". His funeral was held on 29 July 2019. Attendees of the funeral included CCP General Secretary Xi Jinping, Premier Li Keqiang, and former General Secretary Jiang Zemin.

== Family ==
Li Peng was married to Zhu Lin (朱琳), a deputy manager in "a large firm in the south of China". Li and Zhu had 3 children: Li's elder son, Li Xiaopeng; Li's daughter, Li Xiaolin; and, Li's younger son, Li Xiaoyong. Li Xiaoyong is married to Ye Xiaoyan, the daughter of Communist veteran Ye Ting's second son, Ye Zhengming.

Li's family benefited from Li's high position during the 1980s and 1990s. Two of Li's children, Li Xiaopeng and Li Xiaolin, inherited and ran two of China's electrical monopolies. State-run Chinese media have publicly questioned whether it is in China's long-term interest to preserve the "new class of monopoly state capitalists" that Li's family represents. Li Xiaopeng entered politics in Shanxi and became its governor in 2012 and then in 2016, he became Minister of Transport. Li Xiaolin was chief executive of China Power International Development, before being transferred out in 2016 to a minor executive post at a different power company.

== Honours ==
Decoration	Country	Date	Ref.
Order of the Republic	Tunisia	21 May 1984	
Order of Ouissam Alaouite	Morocco	4 October 1995	
Order of the Sun of Peru	Peru	9 October 1995	
Order of the Liberator	Venezuela	13 November 1996	
Order of Merit	Cameroon	10 May 1997	
Nishan-e-Pakistan	Pakistan	10 April 1999	
Order of the Yugoslav Star	Yugoslavia	12 June 2000	
Medal of Pushkin	Russia	31 October 2007	

== See also ==
- Politics of China
- History of the People's Republic of China (1989–2002)
- List of international trips made by Li Peng

Government offices
Preceded by Liu Lanbo	Minister of Electric Power; 1981–1982	Succeeded by Qian Zhengying as Minister of Water Resources and Power
Preceded by He Dongchang as Minister of Education	Chairman of the State Education Commission; 1985–1988	Succeeded by Li Tieying
Preceded by Zhao Ziyang	Premier of China; 1987–1998	Succeeded by Zhu Rongji
Assembly seats
Preceded by Qiao Shi	Chairmen of the Standing Committee of the NPC; 1998–2003	Succeeded by Wu Bangguo
