= Huaneng Power International =

Chinese electric power company

- Type: Public
- Traded as: SSE: 600011 (A share); SEHK: 902 (H share); NYSE: HNP (ADS); HS China Enterprises Index component; SSE SmallCap Index component
- ISIN: CNE000001998; CNE1000006Z4
- Industry: Power generation
- Predecessor: Huaneng International Power Development Corporation
- Founded: 30 June 1994 in Beijing
- Founder: Huaneng Group
- Headquarters: Beijing, China
- Area served: China; Singapore
- Key people: Cao Peixi (Chairman)
- Revenue: 113,814,236,000 renminbi (2016)
- Net income: ▼CN¥1.580 billion (2017)
- Total assets: ▲CN¥396.590 billion (2017)
- Total equity: ▲CN¥87.642 billion (2017)
- Owner: Huaneng Group (47.16%)
- Number of employees: 42,210 (2016)
- Parent: Huaneng Group

Chinese name
- Simplified Chinese: 华能国际电力股份有限公司
- Traditional Chinese: 華能國際電力股份有限公司
Transcriptions
Standard Mandarin
- Hanyu Pinyin: Huánéng Guójì Diànlì Gǔfèn Yǒuxiàn Gōngsī

Abbreviation
- Simplified Chinese: 华能国际电力
- Traditional Chinese: 華能國際電力
Transcriptions
Standard Mandarin
- Hanyu Pinyin: Huánéng Guójì Diànlì

Second abbreviation
- Simplified Chinese: 华能国际
- Traditional Chinese: 華能國際
- Literal meaning: Huaneng International
Transcriptions
Standard Mandarin
- Hanyu Pinyin: Huánéng Guójì
- Website: www.hpi.com.cn

Huaneng Power International, Inc. (HPI), commonly known as Huaneng Power, is a Chinese electric power company. It was established in 1994 by the China Huaneng Group, one of the five largest power producers in China. It engages in the development, construction and operation of large power plants.

As of 31 May 2018, the market capitalization of its H share was HK$28.484 billion. As of 31 December 2017, about 30.92% of total share capital are "foreign share" (H share plus American depositary share), while the rest were domestic share (A share).

Huaneng Power's H share is a component of Hang Seng China Enterprises Index, representing 50 largest H share companies on the Stock Exchange of Hong Kong. However, under different selection criteria, Huaneng Power's A share is a component of SSE SmallCap Index since May 2018, an index for next 320 shares that were not included in SSE 180 Index.

Huaneng Power was ranked 745th in 2018 Forbes Global 2000.

== History ==
Huaneng Power International (HPI) was established in 1994 by China Huaneng Group, a state-owned enterprise, as a new legal person for the reorganization of Huaneng International Power Development Corporation (HIPDC; Chinese: 华能国际电力开发公司). In the same year American depositary share of HPI was listed on the New York Stock Exchange. In 1997 China Huaneng Group, HIPDC and HPI became part of the State Power Corporation of China, a mega corporation that replacing the commercial function of the Ministry of Electric Industry. On 21 January 1998 HPI listed its H share on the Stock Exchange of Hong Kong; its A share was listed on the Shanghai Stock Exchange since 6 December 2001. In 2000, HPI also absorbed fellow sister listed company Shandong Huaneng Power Development.

After the dismantle of the State Power Corporation of China in 2003, HPI climbed up one tier as the third-tier subsidiary of the State Council, as China Huaneng Group was directly supervised by the State Council since 2003. The parent company also injected more assets to HPI in order to floats most of the group assets publicly. In the 2004 deal, HPI also acquired an additional 10% minority interests in Jinggangshan Power Plant from Jiangxi Province Investment Corporation, (Chinese: 江西省投资公司, now Jiangxi Province Investment Group) a subsidiary of Jiangxi Provincial People's Government.

In April 2008, HPI also acquired a special-purpose vehicle SinoSing Power from China Huaneng Group for approx. US$985 million. That SPV acquired Tuas Power from Singapore government owned Temasek Holdings for SG$4.235 billion (approx. US$3.1 billion) in March 2008 in a leverage buyout.

HPI is involved in the development of renewable energy projects.

== Divisions and Subsidiaries ==
As of 31 December 2017

- Jinggangshan Power Plant (100%)
- Luohuang Power Plant
- Hanfeng Power Plant
- Yueyang Power Plant
- Yingkou Power Plant (100%)
- Tuas Power (100%)

== Equity investments ==
- Note: only significant entities were listed

As of 31 December 2017
current

- China Huaneng Finance (20%)

former

- China Yangtze Power (0.65%; disposed in 2017, had a HPI employee that nominated in CYP's supervisory board)

== Shareholders ==
Huaneng Power International is a government controlled corporation which under the supervision of the State-owned Assets Supervision and Administration Commission of the State Council indirectly.

As of 31 December 2017, ultimate parent company China Huaneng Group (CHNG) owned 10.23% shares of Huaneng Power International directly, plus additional 33.33% via a wholly owned subsidiary Huaneng International Power Development Corporation, another 3.11% shares via another subsidiary, Hong Kong incorporated, China Hua Neng Group Hong Kong (Chinese: 中國華能集團香港) and lastly 0.49% shares via mainland incorporated subsidiary, China Huaneng Finance (Chinese: 中国华能财务), for a total of 47.16% shares of HPI.

== See also ==
- Huaneng Lancang River Hydropower, sister listed company
- Huaneng Renewables, sister listed company
