= Huaneng Renewables =

Chinese wind power company

- Company type: Public
- Traded as: unlisted (A share); SEHK: 958 (H share)
- Founded: 1 November 2002
- Headquarters: Beijing, China
- Key people: Lin Gang (Chairman); Cao Shiguan (President)
- Owner: Huaneng Group (52.39%)
- Parent: Huaneng Group

Chinese name
- Simplified Chinese: 华能新能源股份有限公司
- Traditional Chinese: 華能新能源股份有限公司
Transcriptions
Standard Mandarin
- Hanyu Pinyin: Huánéng Xīnnéngyuán Gǔfèn Yǒuxiàn Gōngsī

Abbreviation
- Simplified Chinese: 华能新能源
- Traditional Chinese: 華能新能源
Transcriptions
Standard Mandarin
- Hanyu Pinyin: Huánéng Xīnnéngyuán
- Website: www.hnr.com.cn

Huaneng Renewables Corporation Limited is a Chinese electricity generation company. It is a subsidiary of Chinese state-owned enterprise China Huaneng Group. It mainly generated electricity from wind farm, according to the company.

As of 31 May 2018, the market capitalization of Huaneng Renewables' H shares was HK$16.955 billion.The company completed its privatization and officially delisted on February 24, 2020.

== History ==
Huaneng Renewables started its first initial public offering in 2010. However, the firm withdrawn the application and re-applied in 2011. On 10 June 2011 Huaneng Renewables listed its H shares on the Stock Exchange of Hong Kong.

== See also ==
- Huaneng Lancang River Hydropower, sister listed company
- Huaneng Power International, sister listed company
