= State Power Corporation of China =

Chinese electric power company (1997–2002)

State Power Corporation of China was a Chinese state-owned enterprise founded in 1996 and was dismantled in 2002 to 2003. The successor of the group were fellow state owned enterprises State Grid Corporation of China, China Southern Power Grid, China Huaneng Group, China Guodian, China Huadian, China Datang Corporation, China Power Investment Corporation and other power grid or power generating group.

The former general manager (the highest position of the company at that time) of the company, Gao Yan, fled China in 2002 after he was investigated for corruption.
