= China Huaneng Group =

State-owned electric utility enterprise

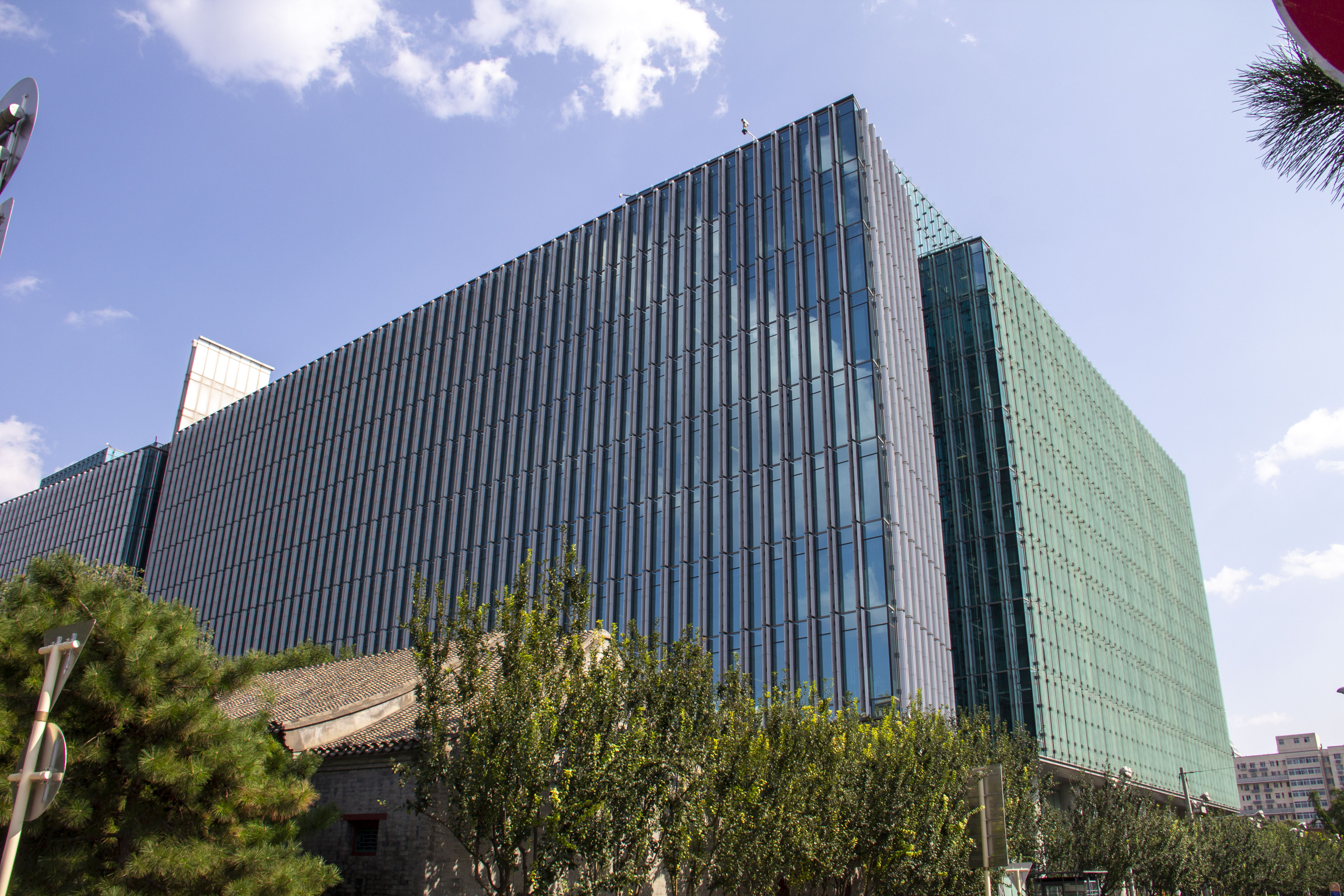
- Huaneng Group headquarters in Xicheng District, Beijing
- Formerly: China Huaneng Group Corporation
- Company type: State-owned enterprise
- Industry: Electricity generation Energy and resources
- Founded: 1989
- Headquarters: Xiong'an, Hebei, China
- Key people: Wen Shugang (Chairman); Deng Jianling (Director of the Board, President)
- Products: Electric power
- Services: Energy generation
- Revenue: 278,627,080,000 renminbi (2018)
- Total assets: CNY ¥1.2 trillion
- Number of employees: 130,000 (2020)
- Subsidiaries: Huaneng Power International
- Website: www.chng.com.cn

China Huaneng Group Co., Ltd., abbreviated as CHNG or Huaneng Group, is one of the five largest state-owned electricity generation enterprises in China, administered by the State-owned Assets Supervision and Administration Commission of the State Council. It engages in the investment, construction, operation and management of power generation assets and the production and sale of electricity. In 2012, the company was ranked 246th on the Fortune 500 list.

== History ==
China Huaneng Group Corporation was founded in 1989 as the holding company for a series of companies of that under the supervision of State Planning Committee of the State Council of China, including Huaneng Coal Corporation and Huaneng International Power Development Corporation, etc. The group was part of a project that replacing oil fired power plant to coal power plant (Chinese: 煤代油). In 1993, the corporation was under the dual supervision of the Ministry of Power Industry and the State Planning Committee. In 1995, Huaneng Coal Corporation became a separate state-owned enterprise group that under the provisional supervision of the State Planning Committee, as Shenhua Group. China Huaneng Group then became the subsidiary of the State Power Corporation of China, a mega-conglomerate that replacing the commercial function of the Ministry of Power Industry. In 2002, the State Power Corporation of China was dismantled as groups of companies of power grid (such as State Grid Corporation of China and China Southern Power Grid) and power plants (such as the big five power groups, Huaneng, China Huadian, China Datang Corporation, China Guodian Corporation and China Power Investment Corporation) In the same year the leader of the mega-conglomerate, Gao Yan had fled China after being investigated for corruption. Huaneng also received some assets from State Power Corporation of China, such as the hydroelectricity company now known as Huaneng Lancang River Hydropower, a listed company since 2017. In 2005, Huaneng also acquired the controlling stake (after the deal owned 51%) of North United Power Corporation from a subsidiary of the People's Government of the Inner Mongolia Autonomous Region, becoming the indirect parent company of listed company Inner Mongolia Mengdian Huaneng Thermal Power (Mengdian Huaneng).

In 1994, it also saw the formation of two listed subsidiaries, Huaneng Power International (HPI) and Shandong Huaneng Power Development. Their American depositary shares were listed on the New York Stock Exchange. HPI later also started initial public offerings on the Stock Exchange of Hong Kong as well as the Shanghai Stock Exchange. The shares of Huaneng Power International was owned by aforementioned Huaneng International Power Development Corporation, but in recent years China Huaneng Group also owned some shares directly. HPI also merged with Shandong Huaneng Power Development in 2000.

In 2002, China Huaneng Group became part of one of China's earliest carbon emissions trading programs, the "4 + 3 + 1" program.

In 2011 China Huaneng Group floated its wind power subsidiary Huaneng Renewables on the Stock Exchange of Hong Kong.

In 2024, China Huaneng Group announced that it would move its headquarters from Xicheng, Beijing to Xiong'an, Hebei. In October 2025, the company relocated its headquarters to Xiong'an, bringing about 1,000 employees.

== Operations ==
The company oversees the national government's interests in 10 subsidiaries, including a 51% stake in Huaneng Power International. Through subsidiaries it develops and operates more than 130 thermal, wind power and hydropower plants. In addition to its power-generation business, the company enters other sectors, including energy-related mining, financing, transportation, information technology, and renewable energy researches. The company's investment division ranks the 15th in China by revenue and the 21st by asset size. The company owns the Changjiang Nuclear Power Plant in partnership with China National Nuclear Corporation, as well as the Beijing Huaneng Thermal Power Station. The latter, however, is to be closed by 2016 as part of Beijing's plan to eradicate pollution.

== Acquisitions ==
In March 2008 CHNG acquired Singapore-based Tuas Power from Temasek Holdings for US$3.04 billion. It was resold to China Huaneng Group's listed subsidiary Huaneng Power International in the same year. In November 2008 CHNG bought 50 per cent stake in InterGen from India's GMR Group for $1.2 billion.

== Structure ==
=== Beijing Headquarter ===
The headquarter of Huaneng Group is located on the Chang'an Street of Beijing, only about 3 kilometers from Tian'anmen. In the headquarter, there are several subsidiaries and departments to take charge of different types of business. Major departments in the Beijing headquarter include:

- Department of General Administration
- Department of Capital Operations and Equity Management
- Department of Supervision
- Department of Development
- Department of Safe Production
- Department of Auditing
- Department of Budget and Planning
- Department of Environmental Protection, Sciences and Technology
- Department of Political Affairs
- Department of Legal Affairs
- Department of Engineering
- Department of Operations
- Department of Finance
- Department of Human Resource
- Department of International Cooperations
- Labor Union

=== Subsidiaries ===
The Huaneng Group runs several subsidiaries corresponding to various types of energy industries. Most of those subsidiaries are based in the Beijing headquarter.

- Huaneng International Power Development Corporation
- Huaneng Properties
- GreenGen
- Huaneng Power International (It is listed on the Hong Kong Stock Exchange, Shanghai Stock Exchange and New York Stock Exchange. It is the Group's main thermal power subsidiary, holding about one third of the Group's installed thermal capacity.)
- Huaneng Energy and Transportation
- China Huaneng Group Clean Energy Research Institute
- Huaneng Renewables (having a capacity of over 10 GW wind power and 800 MW solar power as of 2017)
- Huaneng Capital Service
  - Huaneng Guicheng Trust
- China Huaneng Group Fuel
- Huaneng Nuclear Power Development Company
- Huaneng Technology Innovation Center
- Huaneng Coal Industry Company

=== Regional Branches ===
In addition to Beijing headquarter, Huaneng Group also have branches and companies in at least 29 different provinces or autonomous regions of China. Those regional branches and companies are in real charge of local power plants and electricity generation in each province or region, as well as some other related business. Currently, Huaneng's regional companies and branches include:

Type	Name	Location	Type	Name	Location
Regional Branches	CHNG Northeast	Shenyang	Hydropower	Huaneng Lancang River Hydropower	Kunming
Regional Branches	CHNG Jiangsu	Nanjing	Hydropower	Huaneng Sichuan Hydropower	Chengdu
Regional Branches	CHNG Fujian	Fuzhou	Power Generation	Jilin Power Generation	Changchun
Regional Branches	CHNG Hunan	Changsha	Power Generation	Hainan Power Generation	Haikou
Regional Branches	CHNG Zhejiang	Hangzhou	Power Generation	Heilongjiang Power Generation	Harbin
Regional Branches	CHNG East China	Shanghai	Power Generation	Tibet Power Generation	Lhasa
Regional Branches	CHNG Central China	Wuhan	Power Generation	Shandong Power Generation	Jinan
Regional Branches	CHNG Anhui	Hefei	Power Generation	Shaanxi Power Generation	Xi'an
Regional Branches	CHNG Chongqing	Chongqing	Energy Development	Huaneng Ningxia Energy Development	Yinchuan
Regional Branches	CHNG Qinghai	Xining	Energy Development	Huaneng Gansu Energy Development	Lanzhou
Regional Branches	CHNG Hebei	Shijiazhuang	Energy Development	Huaneng Hulun Buir Energy Development	Hulun Buir
Regional Branches	CHNG Guangxi	Nanning	Energy Development	Huaneng Xinjiang Energy Development	Ürümqi
Regional Branches	CHNG South China	Guangzhou	Other Branches	CHNG Hong Kong	Hong Kong
Regional Branches	CHNG Guizhou	Guiyang	Other Branches	North United Power	Hohhot
Regional Branches	CHNG Jiangxi	Nanchang	Other Branches	Xi'an Thermal Power Research Institute	Xi'an
Regional Branches	CHNG Henan	Zhengzhou	Other Branches	Huaneng Hainan Industrial Company	Haikou
Regional Branches	CHNG Shanxi	Taiyuan	Other Branches	Huaneng Shandong Nuclear Power	Shidao Bay
Beijing Branches	Huaneng Group IT Center	Beijing	Other Branches	CHNG Caofeidian Port	Caofeidian
Beijing Branches	Economy Research Institute	Beijing	Other Branches	CHNG Human Resource Base	
Beijing Branches	CPC Huaneng Party School	Beijing			

== Research ==
China Huaneng Group also takes on science and technology researches in energy-related fields. The company's current research directions and interests include:

- Advanced high-efficiency thermal power generation technology
- Thermal power generation environmental technology
- Coal-based low-carbon conversion technology
- Wind power development
- Hydropower development
- LNG
- Renewable energy and new energy
- Shale Gas
- Coal mining technology
- Energy system
- Energy-related information technology
