= Li Xiaolin =

Chinese businesswoman (born 1961)

- Born: June 1, 1961 (age 65); The Fourth Affiliated Hospital, Huanggu District, Shenyang, Liaoning, China
- Education: Tsinghua University
- Occupation: Company directors
- Parent(s): Li Peng; Zhu Lin
- Relatives: Li Xiaopeng (brother); Li Xiaoyong (brother)

Li Xiaolin (Chinese: 李小琳; born June 1, 1961) is a Chinese businesswoman, currently serving as vice-president of the China Datang Corporation, a state-owned power generation enterprise. She is the former CEO of China Power International Development (SEHK: 2380). She is the only daughter of former Chinese Premier Li Peng and his wife Zhu Lin. She was trained as a power generation engineer at Tsinghua University.

== Career ==
Li was born on International Children's Day in June 1961 at Fourth Affiliated Hospital of China Medical University in Huanggu District, Shenyang, Liaoning Province, Past is Railway Hospital in Liaoning, She is a daughter from three children to Li Peng, then fourth Premier of the People's Republic of China, and Zhu Lin, a Russian-language translator. She was the second of Li Peng's three children. Her older brother is Li Xiaopeng. Li followed her father's footsteps and studied power generation, eventually obtaining a Master of Engineering degree in Power System and Automation from the prestigious Tsinghua University.

Li claims to have spent time at the MIT Sloan School of Management, however MIT stated that the only record it has of attendance by a student with Li’s name was enrollment in a “non-degree short course” open to anyone who has “intellectual curiosity” and pays $7,500 for 15 days of classes. Currently, she is the only female CEO of a Hong Kong Stock Exchange-listed company. She is also a member of the Copenhagen Climate Council. In 2008, she was named one of the 50 most powerful women in business by Fortune magazine. In 2012, Li was conferred with Tamgha-e-Pakistan (Medal of Pakistan). According to Hurun Report's China Rich List 2013, she had an estimated personal fortune of US$550 million, making her the 606th wealthiest person in China.

In 2014, leaked data obtained by the think tank International Consortium of Investigative Journalists (ICIJ) showed that Li Xiaolin owned assets in the tax haven British Virgin Islands. She had been listed as the director of the BVI shell companies Tianwo Holdings Ltd and Tianwo Development Ltd since 2005. The report further revealed that Li and her husband opened a Swiss-based account with HSBC in 2001, and by 2006-2007 held $2.45 million on the account; additionally, the couple were listed as owners of Metralco Overseas S.A., registered in Panama.

In July 2015, Li Xiaolin was transferred from China Power International to China Datang Corporation to serve as a vice-president.

In April 2016, Li was named in the Panama Papers, linking her to a British Virgin Islands company via a Lichtenstein foundation.
