= Huadian Power International =

Chinese power company

Huadian Power International 华电国际电力控股有限公司
- Company type: public
Traded as
SSE: 600027	(A share)
SEHK: 1071	(H share)
- Industry: Power generation
- Founded: 1994
- Headquarters: Jinan, Shandong, China
- Area served: China
- Key people: Chen Feihu (Chairman)
- Parent: China Huadian
- Website: Huadian Power International

Huadian Power International Corporation, formerly Shandong International Power Development Company Limited, is the largest power producer in Shandong Province, China, and is the Hong Kong listed subsidiary of China Huadian, one of the five largest power producers in China. The parent company produces about 10% of China's power, and the subsidiary produces approximately another 5%.

It is headquartered in Jinan, Shandong. It is engaged in the construction and operation of power plants and power generation.

H shares and A shares of the company were listed on the Hong Kong Stock Exchange and Shanghai Stock Exchange in 1999 and 2005 respectively.

Huadian is involved in the development of renewable energy projects.
