= Li Shuoxun =

Chinese revolutionary, father of Li Peng

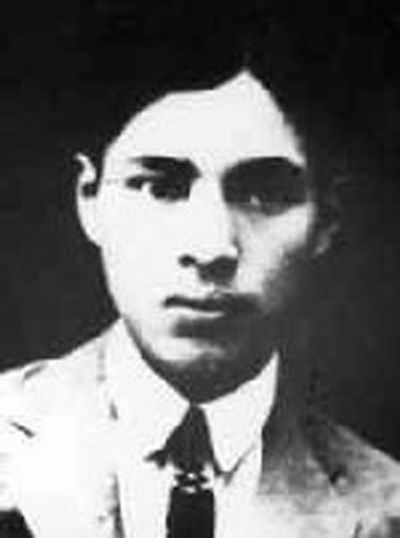

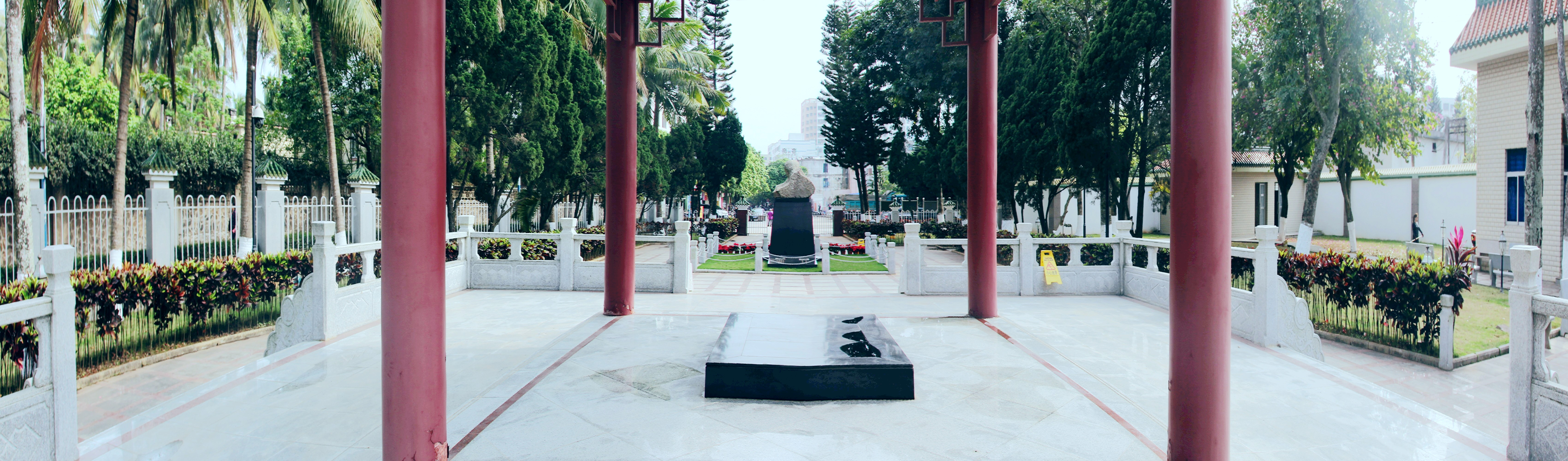
Tomb of Li Shuoxun in Hainan

Li Shuoxun (Chinese: 李硕勋; 1903 Gao County, Sichuan – 1931 Hainan), alternative names Li tao (Chinese: 李陶), Li Kaizhuo (Chinese: 李开卓) and Li Shuxun (Chinese: 李书熏), was a Chinese communist revolutionary, early leader of Chinese Communist Party and martyr.

== Career ==
Born in Gao County, Sichuan, in 1903, Li joined the Chinese Communist Party in 1924 and turned into the underground after the Kuomintang (KMT)'s massacre of communists in 1927. Later in the year, Li Shuoxun, Zhou Shidi and Nie Rongzhen led the 25th division of National Revolutionary Army to join the Nanchang uprising, which marked the start of the Chinese Civil War. Li went to Hainan to take charge of Qiongya guerilla in 1931, before he was caught and executed by the KMT in the same year. He is now commemorated by CPC as a revolutionary martyr.

His orphaned son, Li Peng, was adopted by Zhou Enlai, first Premier of the People's Republic of China, and also served as Premier of the People's Republic of China from 1988 to 1998.
