= China Power International Development =

Chinese electric power company

- Company type: Public
- Traded as: SEHK: 2380
- Industry: Power generation
- Founded: 24 March 2004
- Headquarters: Beijing, China; (operational headquarters); Hong Kong, China; (legal domicile)
- Area served: China
- Key people: Tian Jun (Chairman)
- Parent: SPIC

Chinese name
- Traditional Chinese: 中國電力國際發展有限公司
- Simplified Chinese: 中国电力国际发展有限公司
Transcriptions
Standard Mandarin
- Hanyu Pinyin: Zhōngguó Diànlì Guójì Fāzhǎn Yǒuxiàn Gōngsī

Abbreviation
- Traditional Chinese: 中國電力國際發展
- Simplified Chinese: 中国电力国际发展
Transcriptions
Standard Mandarin
- Hanyu Pinyin: Zhōngguó Diànlì Guójì Fāzhǎn

Second abbreviation
- Traditional Chinese: 中國電力
- Simplified Chinese: 中国电力
Transcriptions
Standard Mandarin
- Hanyu Pinyin: p=Zhōngguó Diànlì
- Website: www.chinapower.hk

China Power International Development Limited (CPID), also known as just China Power, is a Chinese electric power company incorporated in Hong Kong in 2004. The former ultimate parent company China Power Investment Corporation (CPI Group), a Chinese state-owned enterprise also has the initials "CPI" but in the case of the parent company the "I" stands for "Investment" (投资) not "International" (国际). State Power Investment Corporation (SPIC) became the new parent company of CPID after CPI Group was merged with another state-owned enterprise.

CPID is one of several Hong Kong listed subsidiaries of five national power generating groups in the Mainland China. Huadian Group, Huaneng Group, and Datang Group also have Hong Kong listed subsidiaries, in each case with the word "International" added to the title. CPID also a red chip company, a term for foreign incorporated listed company with Chinese government background in the Stock Exchange of Hong Kong (as Hong Kong had a separate jurisdiction from the Mainland). The fifth of the Big Five China power groups, Guodian Group has a listed subsidiary in Shanghai.

As of 31 May 2018, the market capitalization of China Power International Development was HK$21.379 billion.

== History ==
former logo of CPID and CPI Group

China Power International Development Limited was incorporated in Hong Kong in 2004. Its predecessor and direct parent company, another Hong Kong incorporated company, China Power International Holding Limited (Chinese: 中國電力國際有限公司; lit. 'China Power International Co.', 'Ltd.'), was founded in 1994. It is ultimately controlled by the State Power Investment Corporation (previously China Power Investment Corporation), one of the five large national power generating groups that were administered by the State-owned Assets Supervision and Administration Commission of the State Council. CPID is engaged in developing, constructing, owning, managing and operating large power plants in China.

CPID was listed in the Stock Exchange of Hong Kong on 15 October 2004. It was the only red chip company among the big 5 electric power generation companies of the Mainland China, the other three were H shares companies as well as dual listed in the Mainland China. The last listed subsidiary, was listed only in the Mainland China stock exchange.

In 2009 CPID acquired 63% equity interests in Wu Ling Power making hydroelectric power 18.73% of its total installed capacity, the highest of any of the Chinese IPPs. This protects the company from the costs of coal power in China, and makes its overall profile cleaner.
