= China Huadian Corporation =

Chinese state-owned power generation enterprise

China Huadian Corporation 中国华电集团公司

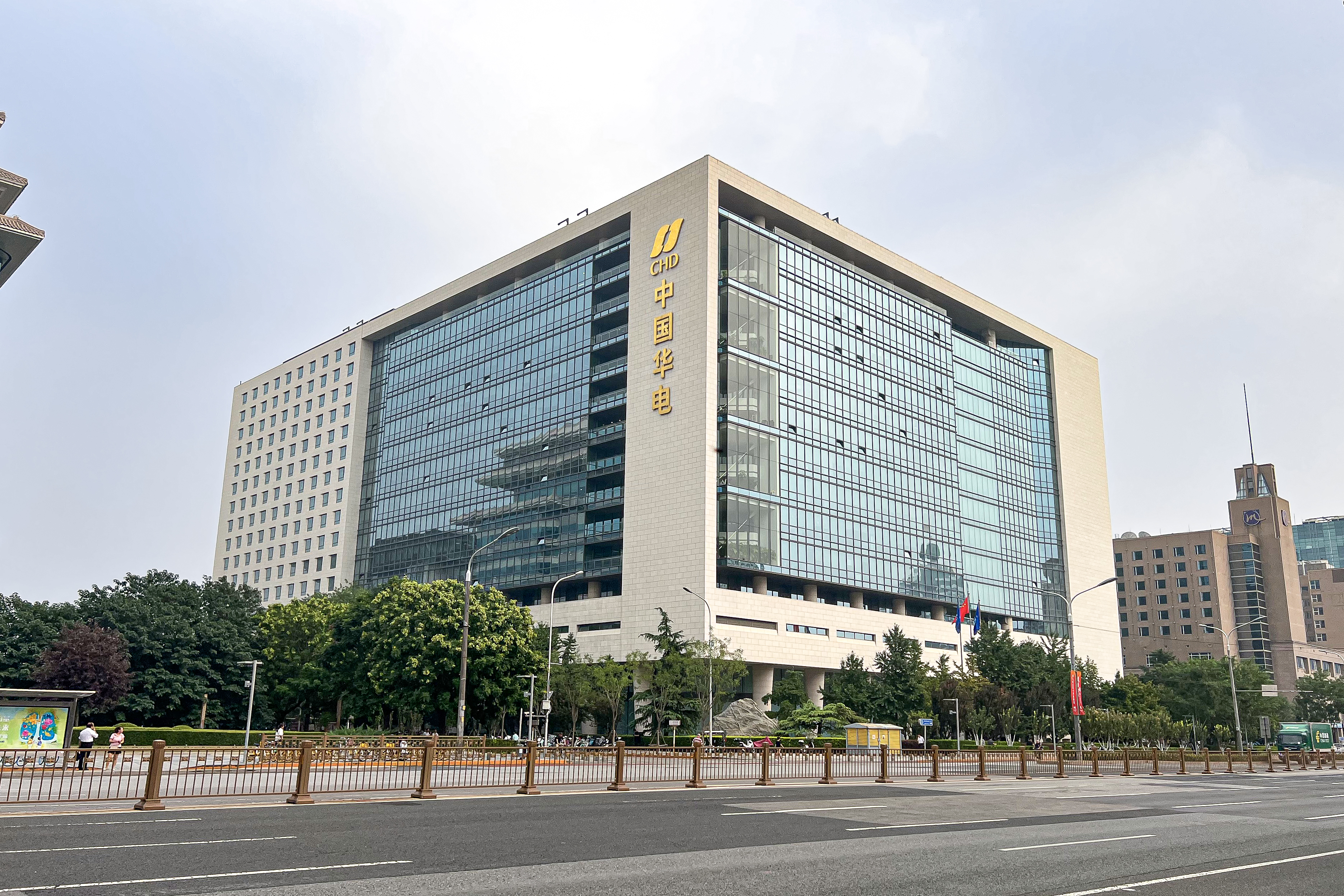
- Huadian Group headquarters in Xicheng District, Beijing
- Company type: State-owned enterprise
- Industry: Power generation
- Founded: 2002
- Headquarters: Xicheng District, Beijing, China
- Area served: China
- Key people: Zhao Jianguo (Chairman)
- Products: Electric power
- Subsidiaries: Huadian Power International
- Website: www.chd.com.cn

China Huadian Corporation (Huadian Group; 华电集团) is one of the five largest state-owned power generation enterprises in China, administered by SASAC for the State Council. It engages in the generation and supply of electricity and heat, and the development of power-related primary energy. It produces about 10% of China's power along with Huaneng Group, Datang Group, SPIC and China Energy.

== Subsidiaries ==
- Huadian Power International (华电国际电力股份有限公司) (SEHK: 1071, SSE: 600027, A share), which is listed on the Hong Kong Stock Exchange and Shanghai Stock Exchange, is the Group's major subsidiary company. It operates thermal powers stations in China.
- Huadian Energy is an electric power subsidiary based in Harbin, Heilongjiang province.
- Huadian New Energy Development Company Limited (华电新能源发展有限公司) is the Group's main renewables subsidiary.
- China Fortune International Trust (100%)
