= China Datang Corporation =

Chinese Power Generation Company

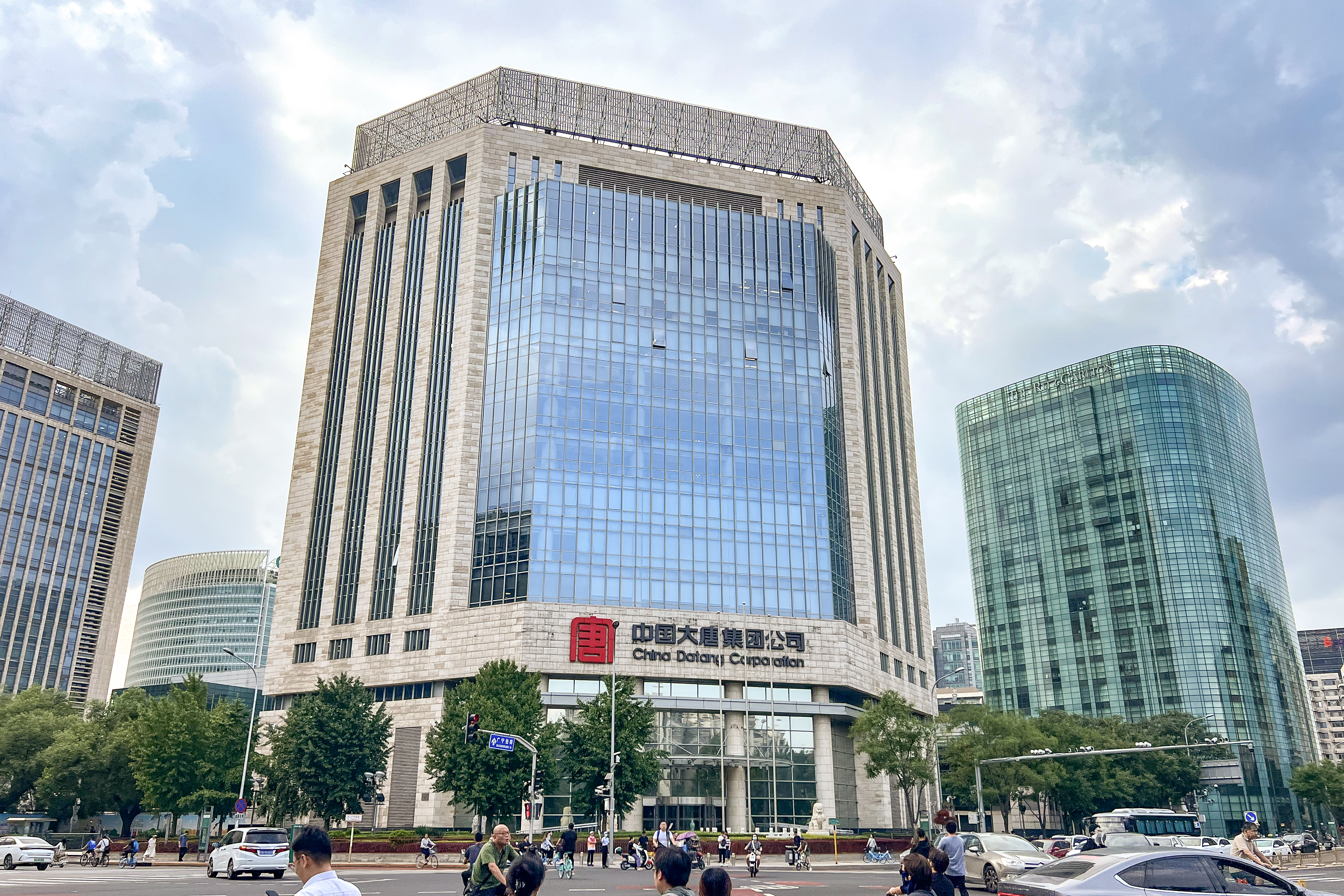
- Headquarters
- Native name: 中国大唐集团公司
- Type: State-owned enterprise
- Industry: Power Generation
- Founded: 2002
- Headquarters: Beijing, China
- Area served: China
- Key people: Liu Shunda (Chairman)
- Subsidiaries: Datang International Power Generation Company; Datang Renewable Power Company
- Website: China Datang Corp

China Datang Corporation (CDT) is one of the five large-scale power generation enterprises in China, established on the basis of former State Power Corporation of China in 2002. It is a solely state-owned enterprise directly managed by the SASAC and is the experimental state-authorized investment and state shareholding enterprise ratified by the State Council.

== Subsidiaries ==
- Datang International Power Generation Company (大唐国际发电股份) is a core subsidiary company with approximately one third of the Group's thermal installed capacity.
- Datang Renewable Power Company was listed on the Hong Kong Stock exchange in December 2010.

== See also ==
- China Southern Power Grid
- China State Grid Corporation
