= Electricity sector in China =

Electricity sector of China
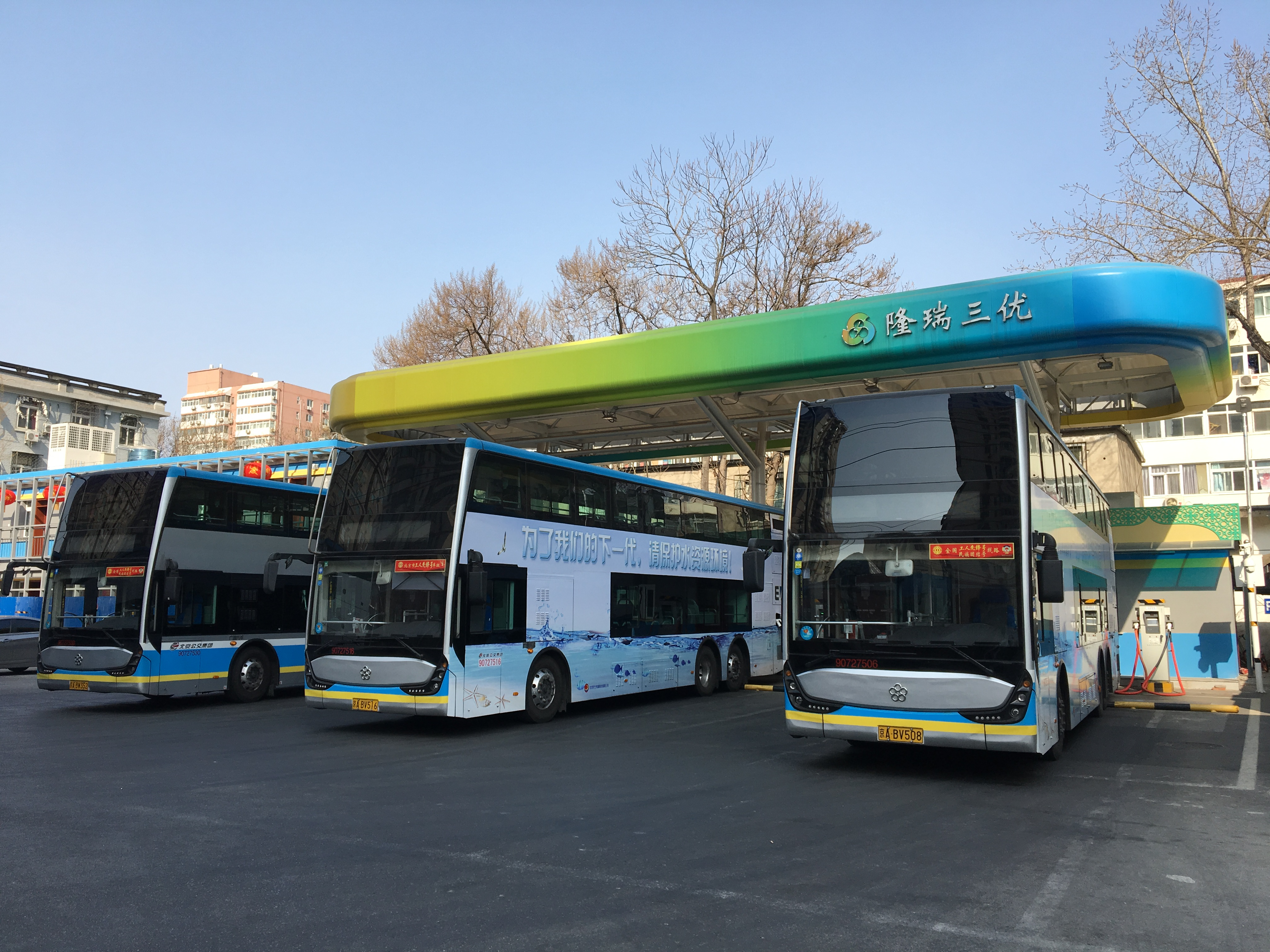

Data
- Installed capacity (2023): 2919 GW
- Production (2021): 8.5 petawatt-hour (PWh)

China remains heavily dependent on coal for generation of electricity

By 2025, Asia is projected to account for half of the world's electricity consumption, with one-third of global electricity to be consumed in China.

China is the world's largest electricity producer. It overtook the United States in 2011 after rapid growth since the early 1990s. In 2021, China produced 8,534 terawatt-hour (TWh) of electricity, which was approximately 30% of the world's electricity production.

Most of the electricity in China comes from coal power, which accounted for 62% of electricity generation in 2021 and is a big part of greenhouse gas emissions by China. Power generated from renewable energy has also been continuously increasing in the country. The national electricity generation from renewable energy reached 594.7 TWh in Q1 2023, an increase of 11.4% year-on-year, including 342.2 TWh of wind and solar power, up 27.8% year-on-year.

In 2023, China's total installed electric generation capacity was 2.92 TW, of which 1.26 TW was renewable, including 376 GW from wind power and 425 GW from solar power. As of 2023, the total power generation capacity for renewable energy sources in China is at 53.9%. The rest was mostly coal capacity, with 1040 GW in 2019. Nuclear also plays an increasing role in the national electricity sector. As of February 2023, China has 55 nuclear plants with 57 GW of power in operation, 22 under construction with 24 GW and more than 70 planned with 88 GW. About 5% of electricity in the country comes from nuclear energy.

China has two wide area synchronous grids, the State Grid and the China Southern Power Grid. The northern power grids were synchronized in 2005. Since 2011 all Chinese provinces are interconnected. The two grids are joined by HVDC back-to-back connections and point-to-point links.

China has abundant energy reserves with the world's fourth-largest coal reserves and massive hydroelectric resources. There is however a geographical mismatch between the location of the coal fields in the northeast (Heilongjiang, Jilin, and Liaoning) and north (Shanxi, Shaanxi, and Henan), hydropower in the south-west (Sichuan, Yunnan, and Tibet), and the growing industrial load centers of the east (Shanghai-Zhejiang) and south (Guangdong, Fujian).

== History ==
In the first half of the 20th century, the energy sector of China was considered as underdeveloped, compared to Japan or Germany. One of the first hydroelectric plants in China was built in 1912 in Shilongba by the german Siemens company and connected to Kunming with a 23 kV power line. Before 1950, a major electricity network existed in the former Japanese-controlled Manchuria state, connecting hydroelectric plants and major industrial centers with 220 and 154 kV power lines. A nation-wide electrification program started after the end of the civil war in 1950.

Before 1994, electricity supply was managed by electric power bureaus of the provincial governments. Now utilities are managed by corporations outside of the government administration structure.

In April 1996, an Electric Power Law was implemented, a major event in China's electric power industry. The law set out to promote the development of the electric power industry, to protect the legal rights of investors, managers, and consumers, and to regulate the generation, distribution, and consumption.

To end the State Power Corporation's (SPC) monopoly of the power industry, China's State Council dismantled the corporation in December 2002 and set up 11 smaller companies. SPC had owned 46% of the country's electrical generation assets and 90% of the electrical supply assets. The smaller companies include two electric power grid operators, five electric power generation companies, and four relevant business companies. Each of the five electric power generation companies owns less than 20% (32 GW of electricity generation capacity) of China's market share for electric power generation. Ongoing reforms aim to separate power plants from power-supply networks, privatize a significant amount of state-owned property, encourage competition, and revamp pricing mechanisms.

In recent history, China's power industry is characterized by fast growth and an enormous installed base. In 2014, it had the largest installed electricity generation capacity in the world with 1505 GW and generated 5583 TWh. China also has the largest thermal power capacity, the largest hydropower capacity, the largest wind power capacity and the largest solar capacity in the world. Despite an expected rapid increase in installed capacity scheduled in 2014 for both wind and solar, and an expected increase to 60 GW in nuclear by 2020, coal will still account for between 65% and 75% of capacity in 2020.

In the spring of 2011, according to The New York Times, shortages of electricity existed, and power outages were anticipated. The government-regulated price of electricity had not matched rising prices for coal.

In 2020, Chinese Communist Party general secretary Xi Jinping announced that China aims to go carbon-neutral by 2060 in accordance with the Paris climate accord.

In 2024, China's National Energy Administration ceased publishing data on power utilization by each generating source, impeding analysis of grid constraints.

== Production and capacity ==
Electricity generation in China by source in TWh:

- Wind
- Solar
- Hydro
- Biofuels and waste
- Nuclear
- Coal
- Oil
- Gas
- Fossil (Inc. Biomass)

Electricity production (GWh) in China by source, 2008–2025
Year	Total	Fossil			Nuclear	Renewable								Total renewable	% renewable
Year	Total	Coal	Oil	Gas	Nuclear	Hydro	Wind	Solar PV	Biofuels	Waste	Solar thermal	Geo- thermal	Tide	Total renewable	% renewable
2008	3,481,985	2,743,767	23,791	31,028	68,394	585,187	14,800	152	14,715	0	0	144	7	615,005	17.66%
2009	3,741,961	2,940,751	16,612	50,813	70,134	615,640	26,900	279	20,700	0	0	125	7	663,651	17.74%
2010	4,207,993	3,250,409	13,236	69,027	73,880	722,172	44,622	699	24,750	9,064	2	125	7	801,441	19.05%
2011	4,715,761	3,723,315	7,786	84,022	86,350	698,945	70,331	2,604	31,500	10,770	6	125	7	814,288	17.27%
2012	4,994,038	3,785,022	6,698	85,686	97,394	872,107	95,978	6,344	33,700	10,968	9	125	7	1,019,238	20.41%
2013	5,447,231	4,110,826	6,504	90,602	111,613	920,291	141,197	15,451	38,300	12,304	26	109	8	1,127,686	20.70%
2014	5,678,945	4,115,215	9,517	114,505	132,538	1,064,337	156,078	29,195	44,437	12,956	34	125	8	1,307,170	23.02%
2015	5,859,958	4,108,994	9,679	145,346	170,789	1,130,270	185,766	45,225	52,700	11,029	27	125	8	1,425,180	24.32%
2016	6,217,907	4,241,786	10,367	170,488	213,287	1,193,374	237,071	75,256	64,700	11,413	29	125	11	1,581,979	25.44%
2017	6,452,900	4,178,200	2,700	203,200	248,100	1,194,700	304,600	117,800	81,300					1,700,000	26.34%
2018	6,994,700	4,482,900	1,500	215,500	295,000	1,232,100	365,800	176,900	93,600					1,868,400	26.71%
2019	7,326,900	4,553,800	1,300	232,500	348,700	1,302,100	405,300	224,000	112,600					2,044,000	27.76%
2020	7,623,600	4,629,600	10,800	252,500	366,200	1,355,200	466,500	261,100	43,800	135,500				2,218,300	29.09%
2021	8,395,900	5,042,600	12,200	287,100	407,500	1,339,900	655,800	327,000	50,200	165,800				2,488,500	29.64%
2022	8,848,710	5,888,790			417,780	1,352,200	762,670	427,270						2,542,120	28.73%
2023	9,456,440	6,265,740			434,720	1,285,850	885,870	584,150						2,755,880	29.14%
2024	10,086,880	6,374,260			450,850	1,425,680	997,040	839,040						3,261,760	32.33%
2025	10,575,250	6,327,150			485,230	1,461,670	1,127,920	1,173,240						3,762,830	35.58%

Electricity production in China (TWh)
	Total	From coal	Coal %
2004	2,200	1,713	78%
2007	3,279	2,656	81%
2008	3,457	2,733	79%
2009	3,696	2,913	79%
2010	4,208	3,273	78%
2011	4,715	3,724	79%
2012	4,937	3,850	78%
2013	5,398	4,200	78%
2014	5,583	4,354	78%
2015	5,666	4,115	73%
2016	5,920	3,906	66%
2017	6,453	4,178	65%
2018	6,995	4,483	64%
2019	7,327	4,554	62%
2020	7,623	4,926	60.7%
2021	8,395	5,042	60%
excluding Hong Kong

=== ChinaEnergyPortal.org ===
China Energy Portal publishes Chinese energy policy, news, and statistics and provides tools for their translation into English. Translations on this site depend entirely on contributions from its readers. 2020 electricity & other energy statistics (preliminary)

Total power production
Source	2019 [TWh]	2020 [TWh]	Change [%]
Total	7,326.9	7,623.6	4.0
Hydro power	1,302.1	1,355.2	4.1
Thermal power	5,046.5	5,174.3	2.5
Nuclear power	348.7	366.2	5.0
Wind power	405.3	466.5	15.1
Solar power	224	261.1	16.6

Installed generation capacity
Source	2019 [GW]	2020 [GW]	Change [%]
Total	2,010.06	2,200.58	9.5
Hydro power	358.04	370.16	3.4
Thermal power	1,189.57	1,245.17	4.7
Nuclear power	48.74	49.89	2.4
Wind power	209.15	281.53	34.6
Solar power	204.18	253.43	24.1

Change in generation capacity
Source	2019 [MW]	2020 [MW]	Change [%]
Total	105,000	190,870	81.8
Hydro power	4,450	13,230	197.7
Thermal power	44,230	56,370	27.4
Nuclear power	4,090	1,120	−72.6
Wind power	25,720	71,670	178.7
Solar power	26,520	48,200	81.7

(Note that change in generation capacity is new installations minus retirements.)

=== National Bureau of Statistics of China ===
The official Statistics available in English are not all up to date. Numbers are given in "(100 million kw.h)" which equals 100 GWh or 0.1 TWh.

Electricity Production by source
Source	2011	2012	2013	2014	2015	2016	2017	2018	2019	2020	2021
Hydro Power	6989.4	8721.1	9202.9	10728.8	11302.7	11840.5	11978.7	12317.9	13044.4	13552.1	13401
Thermal Power	38337	38928.1	42470.1	44001.1	42841.9	44370.7	47546	50963.2	52201.5	53302.5	56463
Nuclear Power	863.5	973.9	1116.1	1325.4	1707.9	2132.9	2480.7	2943.6	3481	3662	4075
Wind Power	703.3	959.8	1412	1599.8	1857.7	2370.7	2972.3	3659.7	4057	4665	6556
Solar Power	26	63.4	154.5	292	452.3	752.6	1178	1769	2240	2611	3270

== Sources ==
In 2022, coal remained the primary source of electricity generation in China, accounting for 61.7% of total output. Other fossil fuels accounted for a smaller share, with natural gas contributing 3.0% and oil 0.1%. Renewable and low-carbon energy sources accounted for a growing proportion, including hydropower (15.1%), wind power (8.5%), solar photovoltaic (PV) (4.8%), and biofuels (2.0%). Nuclear energy contributed 4.7%.

=== Coal power ===
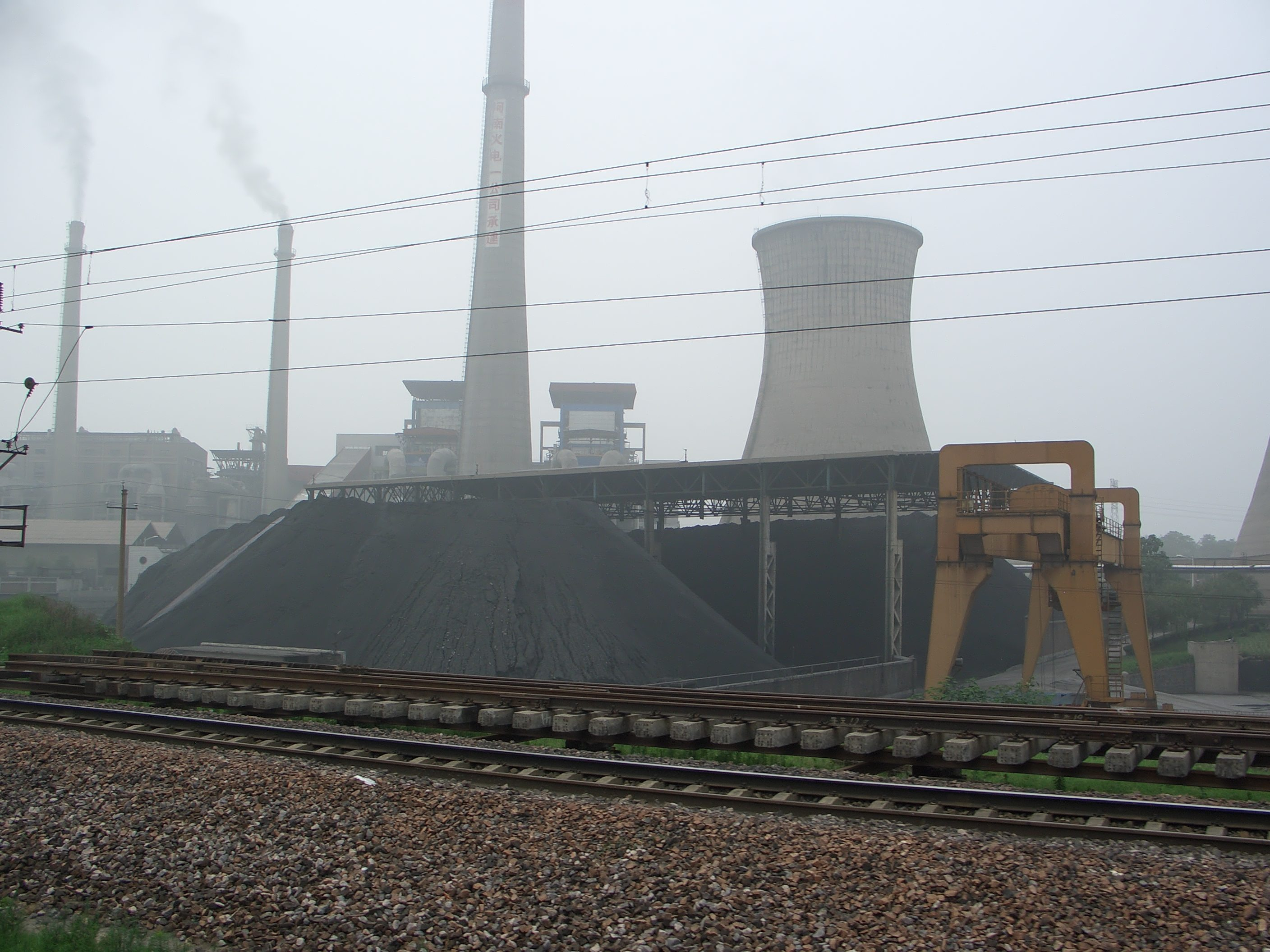
Coal-fired power plant in China

In the People's Republic of China, electricity generated from coal represents over half of all electricity generated in the country. It is a major source of greenhouse gas emissions by China.

China's installed coal-based power generation capacity was 1080 GW in 2021, about half the total installed capacity of power stations in China. In 2025, China brought 78 GW of new coal-fired power capacity online. Coal-fired power stations generated 57% of electricity in 2020. Over half the world's coal-fired power is generated in China. 5 GW of new coal power was approved in the first half of 2021. Quotas force utility companies to buy coal power over cheaper renewable power. China is the largest producer and consumer of coal in the world and is the largest user of coal-derived electricity. Despite China (like other G20 countries) pledging in 2009 to end inefficient fossil fuel subsidies, as of 2020 there are direct subsidies and the main way coal power is favored is by the rules guaranteeing its purchase – so dispatch order is not merit order.

The think tank Carbon Tracker estimated in 2020 that the average coal fleet loss was about 4 USD/MWh and that about 60% of power stations were cashflow negative in 2018 and 2019. In 2020 Carbon Tracker estimated that 43% of coal-fired plants were already more expensive than new renewables and that 94% would be by 2025. According to 2020 analysis by Energy Foundation China, to keep warming to 1.5 degrees C all China's coal power without carbon capture must be phased out by 2045. But in 2023 many new coal power stations were approved. Coal power stations receive payments for their capacity. A 2021 study estimated that all coal power plants could be shut down by 2040, by retiring them at the end of their financial lifetime.

Retirement and addition of coal-fired power capacity

The annual amount of coal plant capacity being retired increased into the mid-2010s. However, the rate of retirement has since stalled, and global coal phase-out is not yet compatible with the goals of the Paris Climate Agreement.

In parallel with retirement of some coal plant capacity, other coal plants are still being added, though the annual amount of added capacity has been declining since the 2010s.

Coal is the main source of electricity but its share is declining

To curtail the continued rapid construction of coal-fired power plants, strong action was taken in April 2016 by the National Energy Administration (NEA), which issued a directive curbing construction in many parts of the country. This was followed up in January 2017 when the NEA canceled a further 103 coal power plants, eliminating 120 GW of future coal-fired capacity, despite the resistance of local authorities mindful of the need to create jobs. The decreasing rate of construction is due to the realization that too many power plants had been built and some existing plants were being used far below capacity. In 2020 over 40% of plants were estimated to be running at a net loss and new plants may become stranded assets. In 2021 some plants were reported close to bankruptcy due to being forbidden to raise electricity prices in line with high coal prices.

Falling capacity factors are forcing Chinese coal generation to take on an untypical role of peaker plants (outside of China gas-fired plants provide this capability, but Chinese authorities don't wish to be dependent of foreign gas). In February 2024 the National Development and Reform Commission (NDRC) announced upgrading coal plants for more effective flexible operation and developing the gas generation where local resources are available. In 2026, China added capacity market payments at CNY330 ($47.5) per kW per year for coal power plants and similar for batteries, paying these facilities to stand by while not producing energy.

As part of China's efforts to achieve its pledges of peak coal consumption by 2030 and carbon neutrality by 2060, a nationwide effort to reduce overcapacity resulted in the closure of many small and dirty coal mines. Major coal-producing provinces like Shaanxi, Inner Mongolia, and Shanxi instituted administrative caps on coal output. These measures contributed to electricity outages in several northeastern provinces in September 2021 and a coal shortage elsewhere in China. The NDRC responded by relaxing some environmental standards and the government allowed coal-fired power plants to defer tax payments. Trade policy was adjusted to allow importing a small amount of coal from Australia. The energy problems abated in a few weeks.

Aligning China's coal fleet with a 1.5°C pathway would require closing much of the operating fleet early rather than retiring plants at the end of their lifetimes, stranding roughly $373 billion of capital, with a further $200 billion avoidable if planned plants are cancelled.

Coal plants are also built for employement purposes. In 2023, The Economist wrote:

Building a coal plant, whether it is needed or not, is also a common way for local governments to boost economic growth. ... They don't like depending on each other for energy. So, for example, a province might prefer to use its own coal plant rather than a cleaner energy source located elsewhere.

=== Hydropower ===
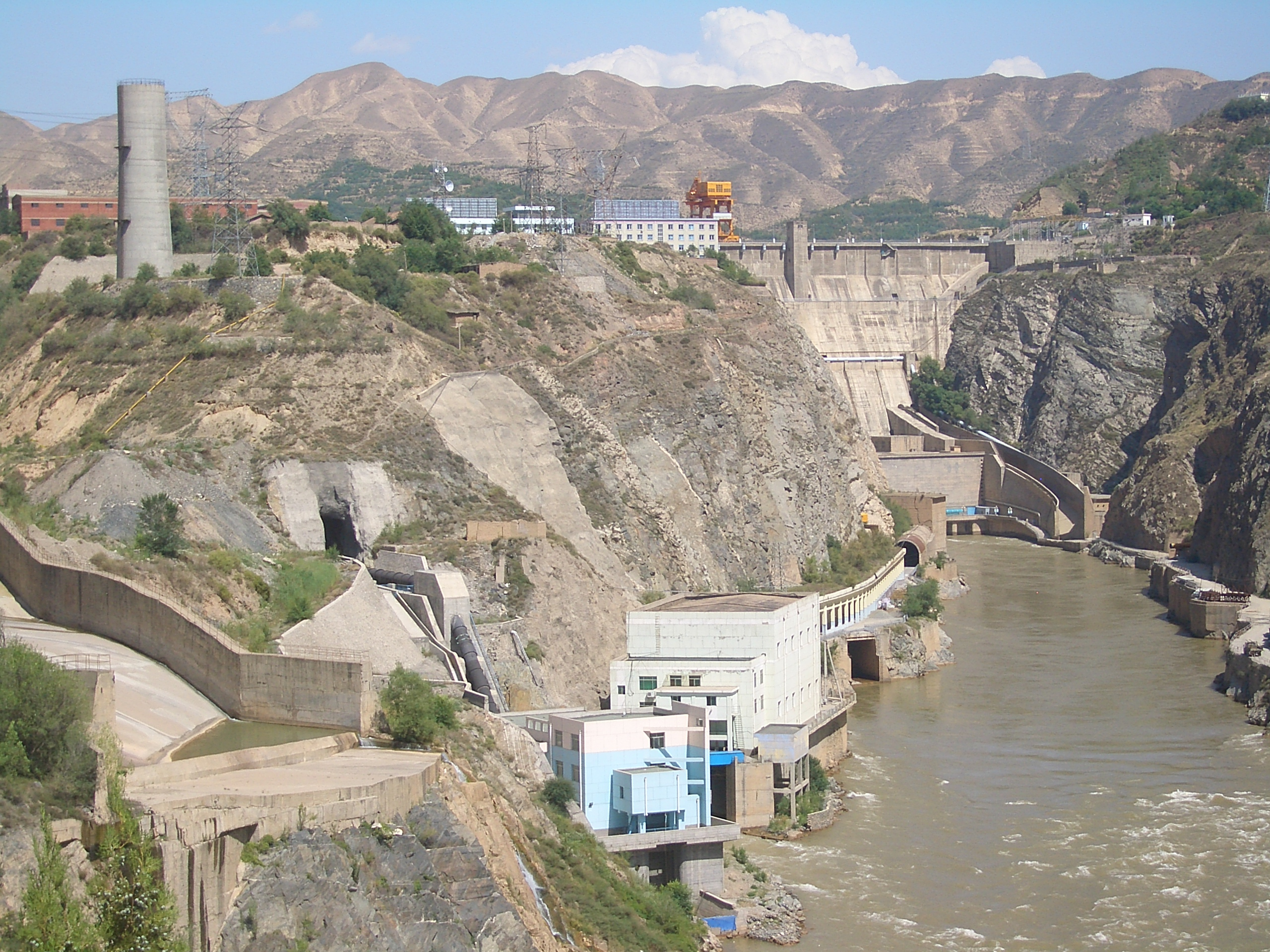
Liujiaxia Dam in Gansu

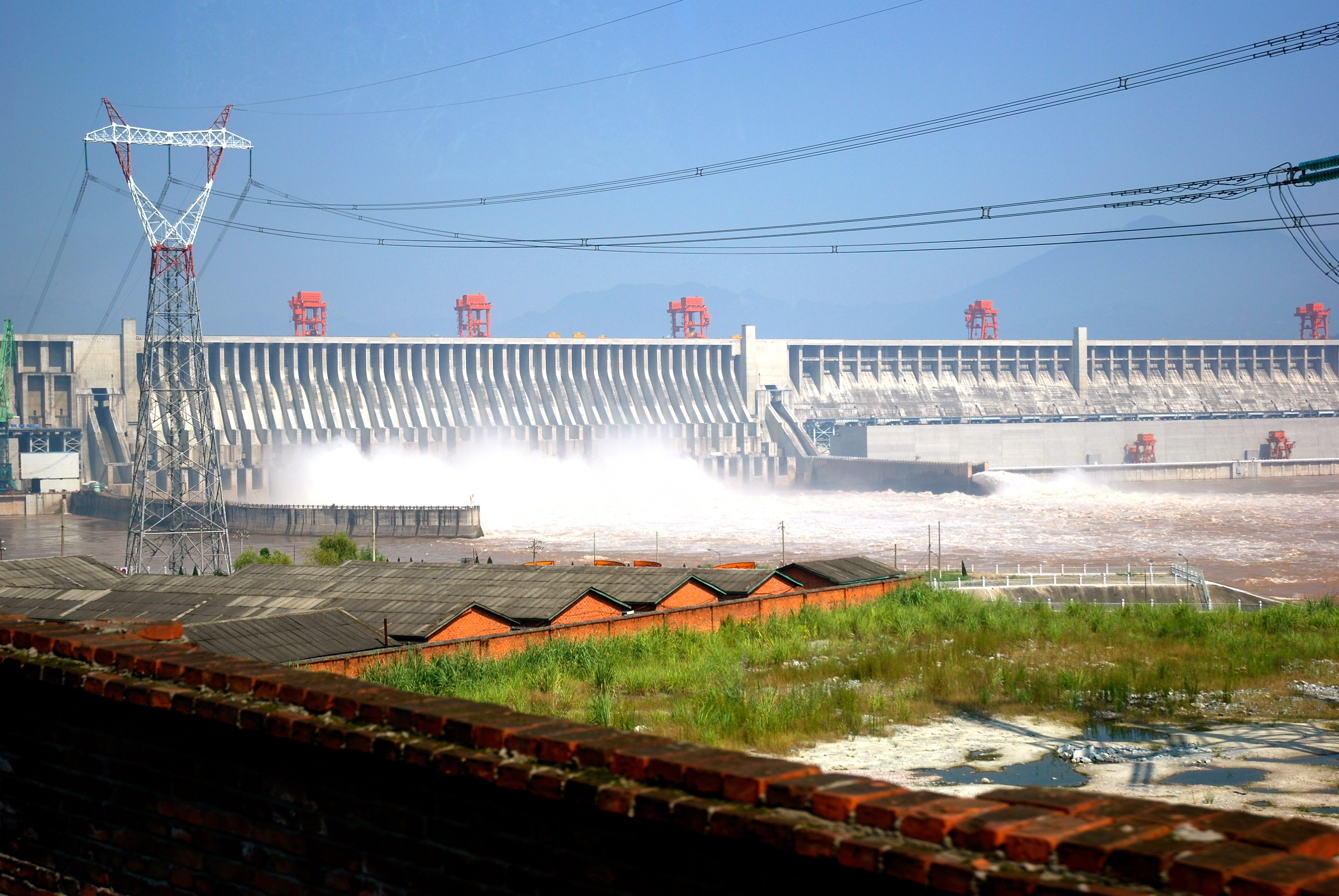
The Three Gorges Dam is the largest power station (of any kind) in the world by installed capacity, with 22.5 GW.

Hydroelectricity is currently China's largest renewable energy source and the second overall after coal.

In 2021, China's total hydropower capacity reached 391 gigawatts (GW), an increase of 72 GW since 2015 when capacity stood at 319 GW. Of this increase, 20 GW was added in 2021. Hydropower accounted for approximately 16% of the country's installed power capacity and electricity generation. China represented about 29% of the world's total hydropower capacity and accounted for approximately 80% of global hydropower capacity additions in 2021. This includes both conventional and pumped-storage hydroelectricity, with most new developments concentrated in the western and southern regions.

According to the Energy Transitions Commission's 2019 report, China 2050: A Fully Developed Rich Zero-Carbon Economy, China has an estimated hydropower potential of up to 660 gigawatts (GW), of which about 500 GW is considered technically and economically feasible. The report projects that by 2050, wind and solar will generate nearly 70% of China's electricity.

In the first half of 2023, China's hydropower capacity factor dropped to 30.5%, its lowest since at least 2015, due to severe drought conditions that reduced water availability. Hydropower output fell by 23%, the largest decline among all electricity sources. Globally, hydropower generation declined by 8.5%.

Although hydroelectricity represents the largest renewable and low greenhouse gas emissions energy source in the country, the social and environmental impact of dam construction in China has been large, with millions of people forced to relocate and large scale damage to the environment.

=== Wind power ===
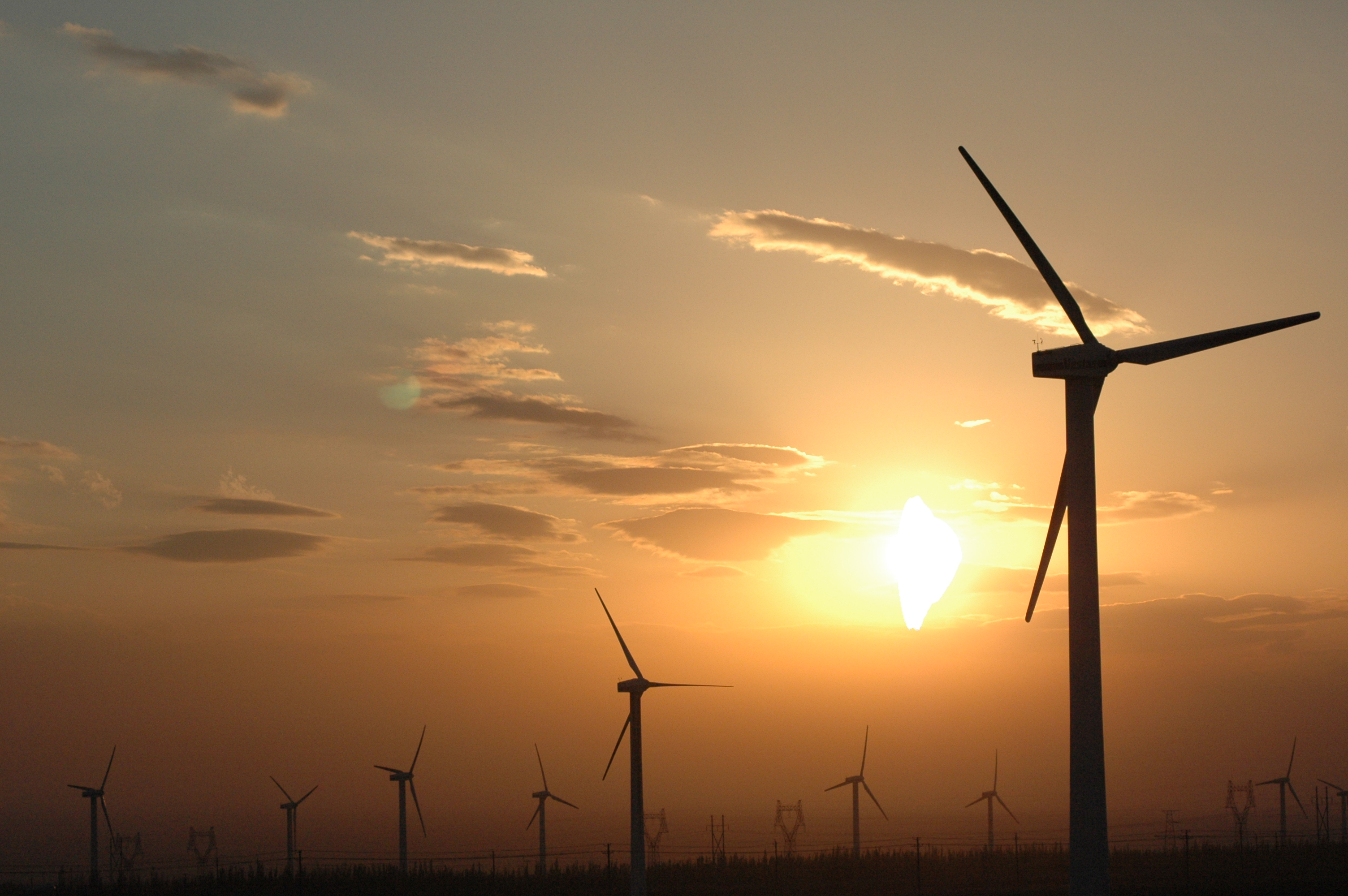
Wind farm in Xinjiang, China

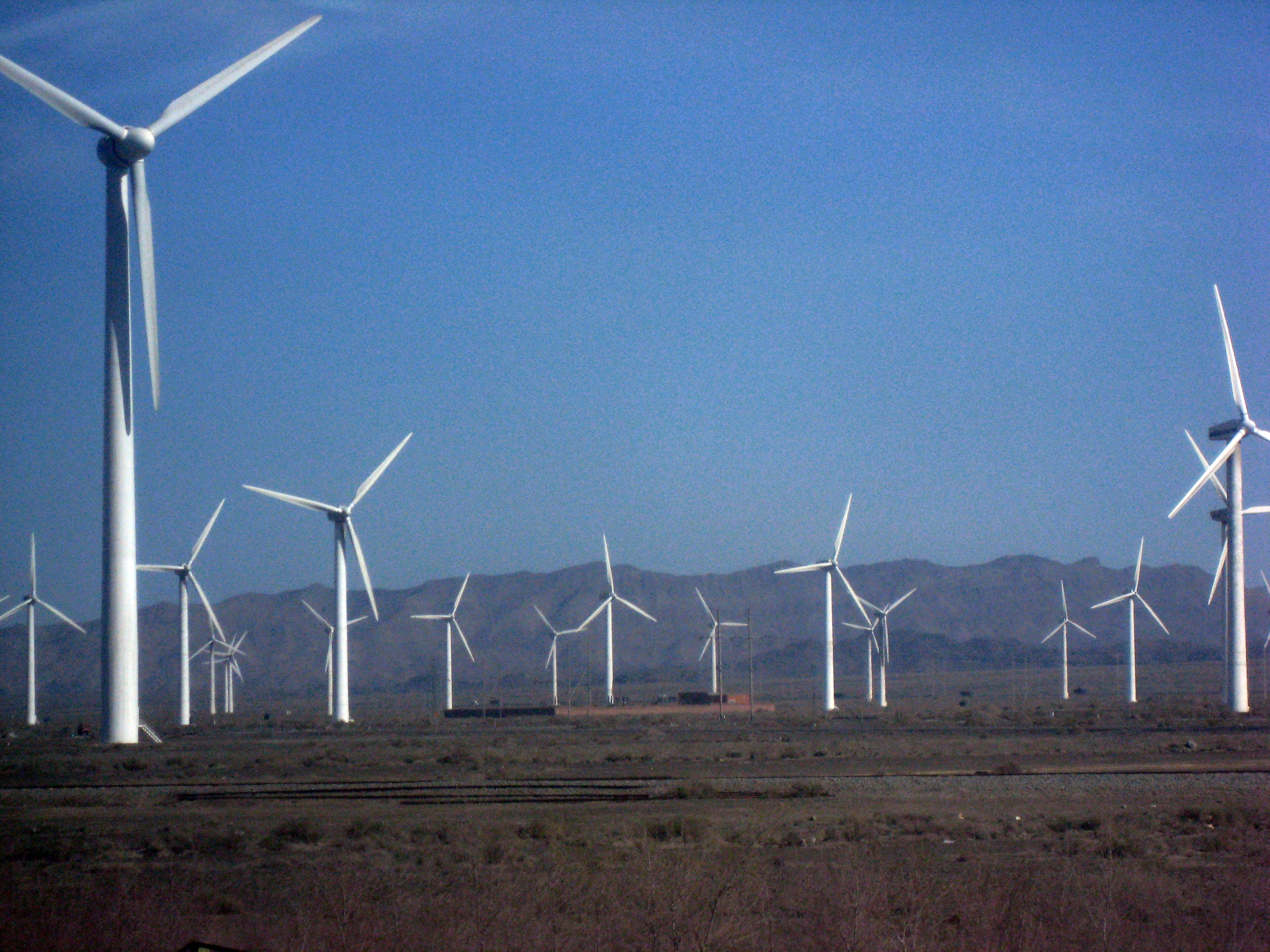
Wind farm in Xinjiang, China

With its large land mass and long coastline, China has exceptional wind resources: it is estimated China has about 2,380 GW of exploitable capacity on land and 200 GW on the sea. At the end of 2021 there was 329 GW of wind power in China providing 655,000 gigawatt-hours (GWh) of wind electricity to the grid. This contrasts with the 114 GW of electricity generating capacity installed in China in 2014 (although capacity of wind power is not on par with capacity of nuclear power). In 2011, China's plan was to have 100 GW of wind power capacity by the end of 2015, with an annual wind generation of 190 terawatt-hours (TWh).

China has identified wind power as a key growth component of the country's economy.

=== Nuclear power ===
In terms of nuclear power generation, China will advance from a moderate development strategy to an accelerating development strategy. Nuclear power will play an even more important role in China's future power development. Especially in the developed coastal areas with heavy power loads, nuclear power will become the backbone of the power structure there. As of February 2023, China has 55 plants with 57 GW of power in operation, 22 under construction with 24 GW and more than 70 planned with 88 GW. About 5% of electricity in the country is due to nuclear energy. These plants generated 417 TWh of electricity in 2022. This percentage is expected to double every 10 years for several decades out. Plans are for 200 GW installed by 2030 which will include a large shift to Fast Breeder reactor and 1500 GW by the end of this century.

=== Solar power ===
China is the world's largest market for both photovoltaics and solar thermal energy. At the end of 2021 there was 306 GW of solar power in China providing 377,000 gigawatt-hours (GWh) of solar power electricity to the grid (out of total 7,770,000 GWh electricity power production. In comparison, of the 7,623 TWh electricity produced in China in 2020, 261.1 TWh was generated by solar power, equivalent to 3.43% of total electricity production. This was a 289% increase since 2016, when production was 67.4 TWh, equivalent to an annual growth rate of 40.4%.

China has been the world's leading installer of solar photovoltaics since 2013 (see also growth of photovoltaics), and the world's largest producer of photovoltaic power since 2015. In 2017 China was the first country to pass 100 GW of cumulative installed PV capacity. However electricity prices are not properly varied by time of day, so do not properly incentivize system balancing.

Solar water heating is also extensively implemented, with a total installed capacity of 290 GWth at the end of 2014, representing about 70% of world's total installed solar thermal capacity. The goal for 2050 is to reach 1,300GW of Solar Capacity. If this goal is to be reached it would be the biggest contributor to Chinese electricity demand.

=== Natural gas ===
China produced 272 Twh of electricity from natural gas in 2021.

China is a global powerhouse in the field of natural gas and one of the world's largest consumers and importers of natural gas. By the end of 2023, China's natural gas industry achieved major milestones, reflecting its important role in the country's energy transformation and its contribution to global natural gas market dynamics.

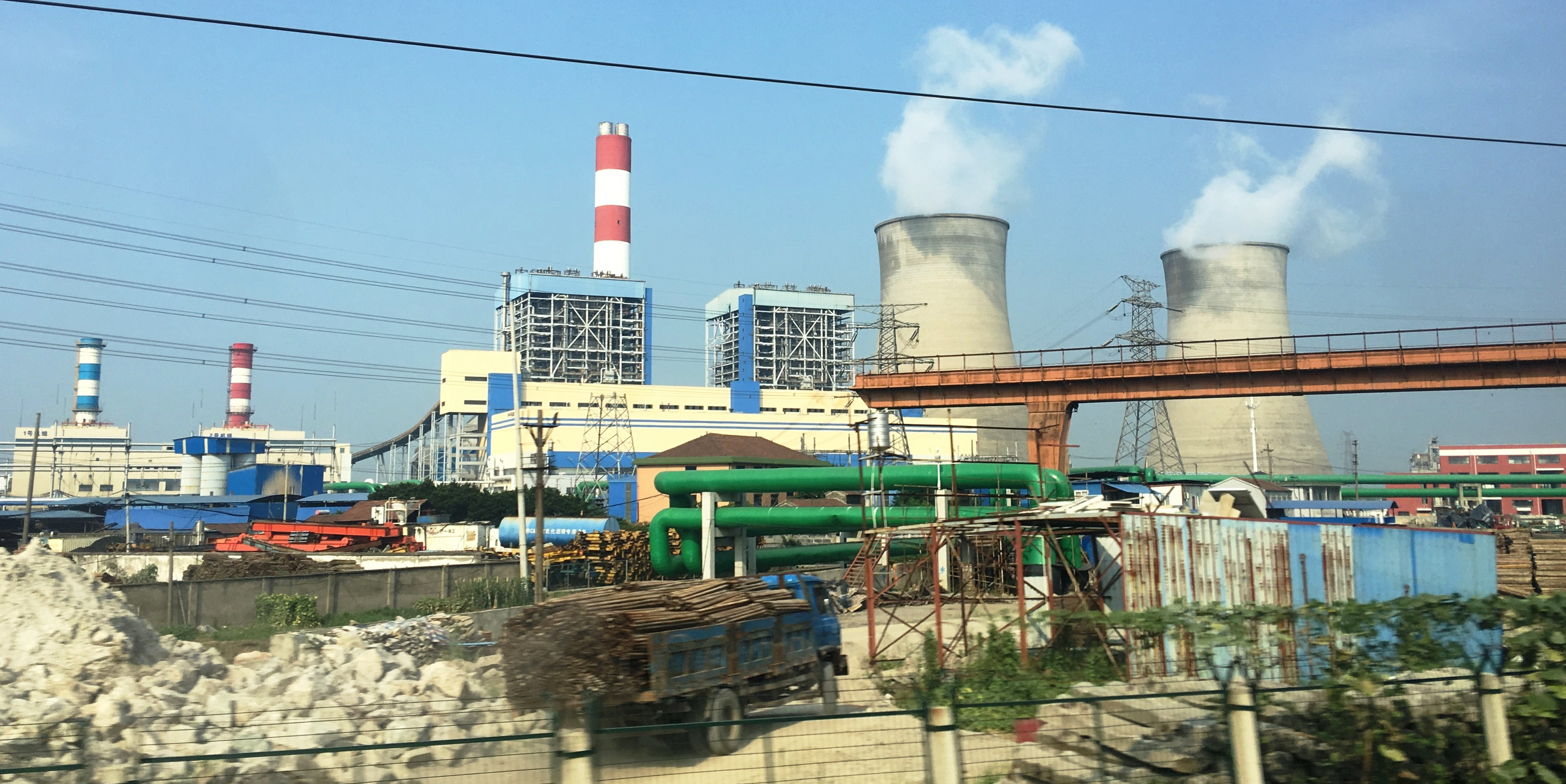
Natural gas factory in Suzhou, Jiangsu

In 2023, China's natural gas production will increase significantly, with the total volume reaching approximately 229.7 billion cubic meters. This represents an increase of nearly 10 billion cubic meters per year and highlights China's efforts to increase domestic production and reduce reliance on imports. Despite the increase in domestic production, China remains the world's largest importer of liquefied natural gas (LNG), importing approximately 165.56 billion cubic meters of natural gas, of which LNG imports account for a large portion. This import capacity strengthens China's key role in the international LNG market and reflects its strategic measures to ensure energy security and supply stability.

Natural gas demand also rebounded, with apparent consumption increasing to 388.82 billion cubic meters. The growth highlights the growing role of natural gas in China's energy mix, driven by its economic recovery and transition to clean energy. Natural gas import dependence is 40.9%, indicating a balance between domestic production and imports to meet the country's energy needs.

=== Biomass and waste ===
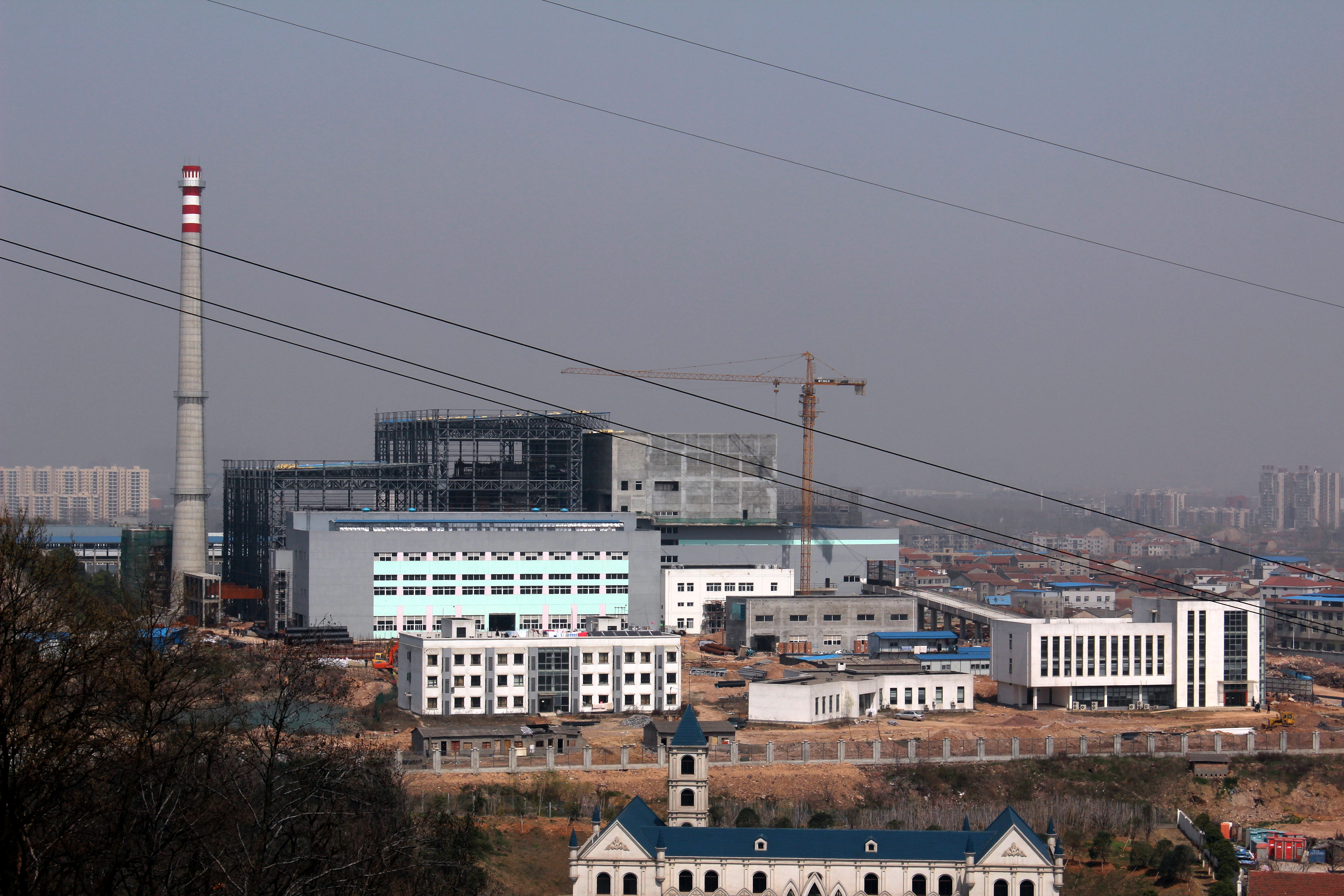
Hanyang Guodingshan Waste to Energy Plant in Wuhan.

China produced 169 Twh of electricity from biomass, geothermal and other renewable sources of energy in 2021.

Since the implementation of supportive policies beginning in 2006, investment and growth in the biomass power sector have accelerated. By 2019, investments had reached an impressive 150.2 billion yuan, climbing further to over 160 billion yuan by 2020, with more than 1,350 biomass projects underway across the country. This growth trajectory has been marked by a significant increase in installed capacity, which saw a record addition of 6,280 MW in 2019. Although the COVID-19 pandemic slightly slowed momentum in 2020, reducing the added capacity to 5,430 MW, the sector's growth trend continued upwards.

Policy initiatives introduced in 2012 and 2016 have been pivotal in spurring the expansion of biomass power generation, leading to a substantial increase in power output. By 2019, biomass power generation had achieved a total output of 111,100 GWh, which further rose to 132,600 GWh in 2020, indicating robust year-on-year growth.

== Storage ==
Energy storage plays a critical role in China's energy landscape, serving as a key enabler for the large-scale integration of renewable energy sources, such as wind and solar power, into the national grid. By mitigating the variability and intermittency of renewable energy, storage technologies facilitate a more stable and reliable power supply. China invests heavily in various storage solutions, including battery storage systems, pumped hydro storage, among others. These technologies not only help in balancing supply and demand but also in improving the overall efficiency and resilience of the power system.

By mid-2025, China passed 100 GW batteries (164 GW total storage) and added capacity market payments. In 2023, China's energy storage industry saw a dramatic surge, with its capacity expanding nearly fourfold due to advancements in technologies such as lithium-ion batteries. This remarkable growth was fueled by an investment exceeding 100 billion yuan (around US$13.9 billion) in recent years. By the close of 2023, the capacity within the sector of new-type energy storage soared to 31.39 gigawatts (GW), achieving an increase of over 260% compared to the previous year and almost a tenfold rise since 2020. The sector encompasses a range of innovative technologies, including electrochemical energy storage, compressed air energy storage, flywheel energy storage, and thermal energy storage, while pumped hydro storage is not included in this category.

== Demand response ==
China's government has introduced a number of policies to promote the development of demand response, such as the 2012 "Interim Measures for the Management of Pilot Cities with Central Fiscal Funds to Support Electricity Demand Side Management." The DR mechanism incentivizes electricity users to adjust their consumption patterns based on signals from grid operators, either reducing demand during peak hours (peak shaving) or increasing demand during off-peak hours (valley filling). This flexibility is critical to maintaining grid stability and ensuring efficient use of energy resources.

China's approach to DR has included pilot projects in cities like Suzhou, Beijing, and Shanghai, focusing on tariff reforms and pricing strategies to encourage participation. Despite these efforts, challenges remain, such as the low participation rate of grid companies and the lack of transparency in grid operation data, hindering the widespread adoption of DR.

The types of demand response in China are:

- Invitation DR: Local governments or grid companies invite consumers to participate in DR events, offering financial incentives for adjusting their load during specified times.
- Real-time DR: Requires participants to respond to demand response signals in real-time, often with minimal notice, to address immediate grid needs.
- Economic DR: Utilizes price signals, such as peak and off-peak rates, to motivate consumers to voluntarily adjust their energy usage according to the cost of electricity.

== Transmission infrastructure ==
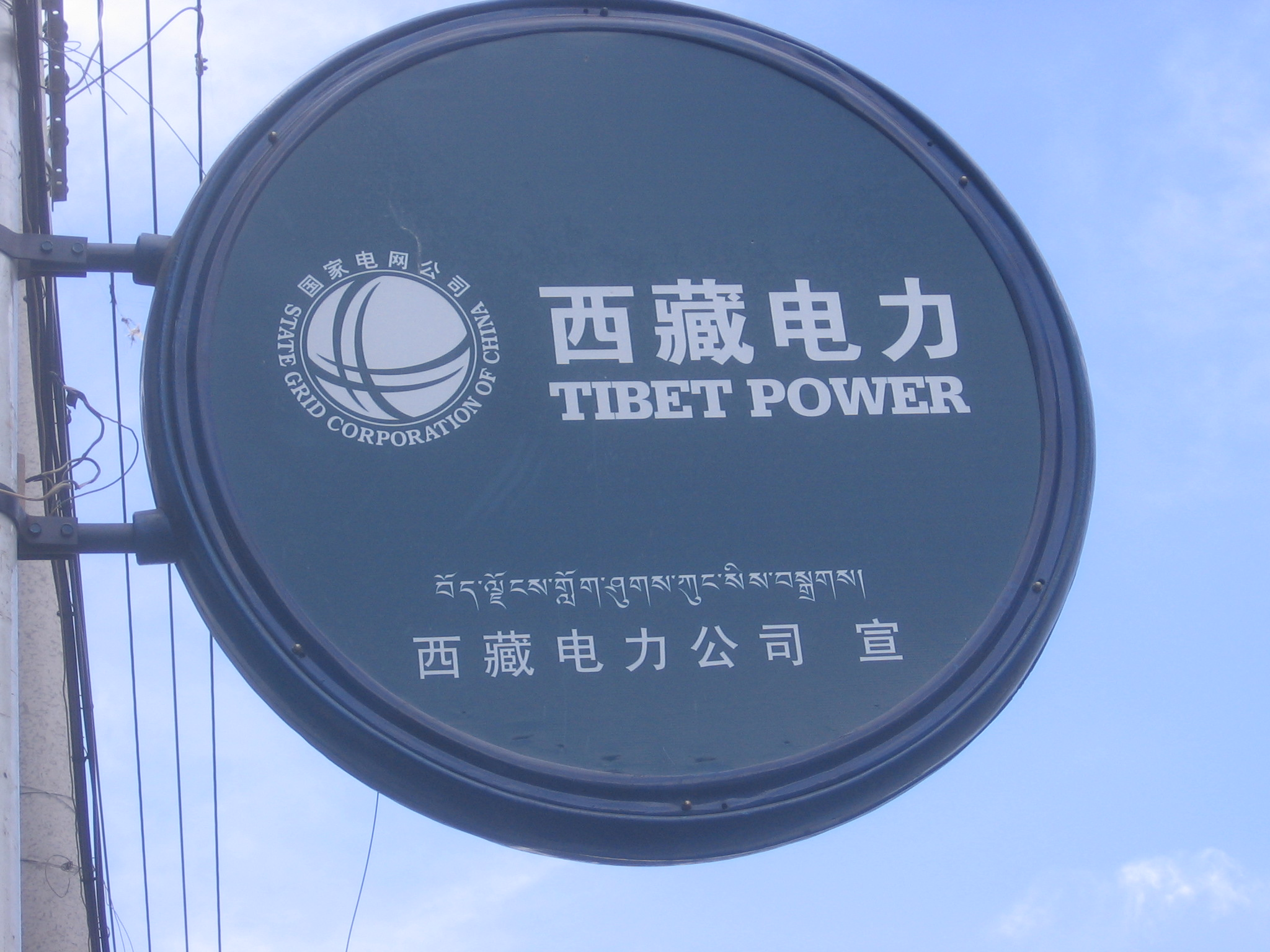
Tibet Power is the company that manages power in Tibet, and is controlled by the State Grid Corporation.

The central government has made the creation of a unified national grid system an economic priority to improve the efficiency of the whole power system and reduce the risk of localised energy shortages. It will also enable the country to tap the hydro potential from western China to meet demand from the eastern coastal provinces. China is planning for smart grid and related Advanced Metering Infrastructure.

=== Ultra-high-voltage transmission ===
The main problem in China is the voltage drop when power is sent over very long distances from one region of the country to another.

Long distance inter-regional transmission has been implemented by using ultra-high voltages (UHV) of 800 kV, based on an extension of technology already in use in other parts of the world.

In 2015, State Grid Corporation of China proposed the Global Energy Interconnection, a long-term proposal to develop globally integrated smart grids and ultra high voltage transmission networks to connect over 80 countries. The idea is supported by CCP General Secretary Xi Jinping and China in attempting to develop support in various internal forums, including UN bodies.

== Companies ==
In terms of the investment amount of China's listed power companies, the top three regions are Guangdong province, Inner Mongolia Autonomous Region and Shanghai, whose investment ratios are 15.33%, 13.84% and 10.53% respectively, followed by Sichuan and Beijing.

China's listed power companies invest mostly in thermal power, hydropower and thermoelectricity, with their investments reaching CNY216.38 billion, CNY97.73 billion, and CNY48.58 billion respectively in 2007. Investment in gas exploration and coal mining follow as the next prevalent investment occurrences.

Major players in China's electric power industry include:

The five majors, and their listed subsidiaries: The five majors are all SOEs directly administered by SASAC. Their listed subsidiaries are substantially independent, hence counted as IPPs, and are major power providers in their own right. Typically each of the big 5 has about 10% of national installed capacity, and their listed subsidiary has an extra 4 or 5% on top of that.

- China Datang Corporation

parent of Datang International Power Generation Company (SEHK: 991; SSE: 601991)

- China Guodian Corporation ("Guodian")

parent of GD Power Development Company (SSE: 600795)

- China Huadian Group

parent of Huadian Power International Co., Ltd.

- China Huaneng Group

parent of Huaneng Power International (NYSE:HNP)

- State Power Investment Corporation ("SPIC")

parent of China Power International Development Limited ("CPID", 2380.HK)

Additionally, two other SOEs also have listed IPP subsidiaries:

- the coalmine owning Shenhua Group

parent of China Shenhua Energy Company (SEHK: 1088, SSE: 601088)

- China Resources Group ("Huarun")

parent of China Resources Power Holdings Company Limited ("CRP", SEHK: 836)

Secondary companies:

- Sieyuan Electric Co., Ltd.
- Shenzhen Energy Co., Ltd.
- Guangdong Yuedian Group Co., Ltd.
- Anhui Province Energy Group Co., Ltd.
- Hebei Jiantou Energy Investment Co., Ltd.
- Guangdong Baolihua New Energy Stock Co., Ltd.
- Shandong Luneng Taishan Cable Co., Ltd.
- Guangzhou Development Industry (Holdings) Co., Ltd.
- Chongqing Jiulong Electric Power Co., Ltd.
- Chongqing Fuling Electric Power Industrial Co., Ltd.
- Shenergy Company (SSE: 600642), Shanghai.
- Shenergy Group, Shanghai.
- Sichuan Chuantou Energy Stock Co., Ltd.
- Naitou Securities Co., Ltd.
- Panjiang Coal and Electric Power Group
- Hunan Huayin Electric Power Co., Ltd.
- Shanxi Top Energy Co., Ltd.
- Inner Mongolia Mengdian Huaneng Thermal Power Co., Ltd.
- SDIC Huajing Power Holdings Co., Ltd.
- Sichuan MinJiang Hydropower Co., Ltd.
- Yunnan Wenshan Electric Power Co., Ltd.
- Guangxi Guidong Electric Power Co., Ltd.
- Sichuan Xichang Electric Power Co., Ltd.
- Sichuan Mingxing Electric Power Co., Ltd.
- Sichuan Guangan Aaa Public Co., Ltd.
- Sichuan Leshan Electric Power Co., Ltd.
- Fujian MingDong Electric Power Co., Ltd.
- Guizhou Qianyuan Power Co., Ltd.

Nuclear and hydro:

- China Three Gorges Corporation
- China Guangdong Nuclear Power Group
- China Yangtze Power (listed)
- Sinohydro Corporation an engineering company.
- Guangdong Meiyan Hydropower Co., Ltd.

Grid operators include:

- State Grid Corporation of China
- China Southern Power Grid
- Sieyuan Electric
- Wenzhou CHINT Group Corporation ("Zhengtai")

Creation of a spot market has been suggested to properly use energy storage.

== Consumption and territorial differences ==
More than a third of electricity is used by industry. China consists of three largely self-governing territories: the mainland, Hong Kong, and Macau. The introduction of electricity to the country was not coordinated between the territories, leading to partially different electrical standards. Mainland China uses type A and I power plugs with 220 V and 50 Hz; Hong Kong and Macau both use type G power plugs with 220 V and 50 Hz. Inter-territorial travelers may therefore require a power adapter.

== See also ==
- Mains electricity by country
