= Guodian =

Guodian may refer to:

- Guodian Chu Slips: a collection of classical Chinese texts found in the Guodian tombs in Jingmen, Hubei
- China Guodian Corporation: a state-owned power generation enterprise in China
- GD Power Development Company: a subsidiary and listed company of China Guodian Corporation

Towns (郭店镇)

- Guodian, Xinzheng, in Xinzheng City, Henan
- Guodian, Fengxiang County, in Fengxiang County, Shaanxi
- Guodian, Jinan, in Licheng District, Jinan, Shandong
