= Liu Gonghui =

President of Beijing University of Technology
- Incumbent
- Assumed office 2015

Personal details
- Born: 1963 (age 62–63) China
- Education: China University of Mining and Technology
- Profession: University President
- Scientific career
- Education: China University of Mining and Technology
- Fields: Mechanical engineering
- Workplaces: Beijing University of Technology
- Thesis: (1992)

Liu Gonghui is currently President of Beijing University of Technology, located in Beijing, China.

== Early life ==
Liu completed his master's degree in mechanical engineering at China University of Mining and Technology in 1989. In 1992, he received his Ph.D. degree in mechanical engineering from the same university. From 1992–1994, he did his postdoc work at Beihang University.

== Career ==
In 1994, Liu joined China University of Petroleum as an assistant professor. He was later promoted to professor and deputy president. In 2007, he was appointed president of Beijing Union University. In 2011, he became president of Beijing Information Science and Technology University. In 2015, he became president of Beijing University of Technology. In 2018, he established a collaboration agreement with University of Silesia in Katowice, Poland

== Awards ==
In 2011, Liu was awarded the honorary doctor of science degree from Anglia Ruskin University, UK.
