= Longyuan =

Longyuan may refer to:

- Longquan, formerly Longyuan County (龙渊)
  - Longyuan Subdistrict, seat of Longquan
- Longyuan Power (龙源)
