= National Institute of Clean-and-Low-Carbon Energy =

Chinese research institute

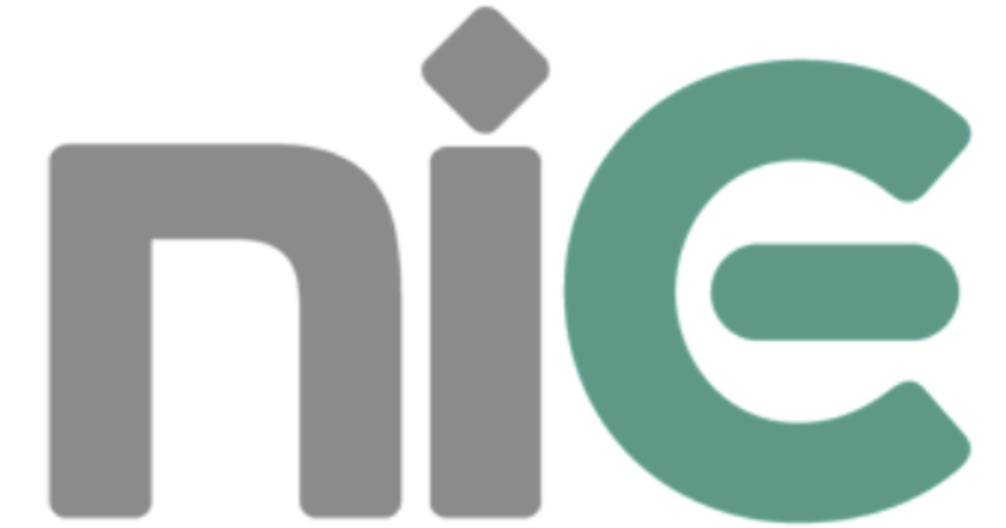
- Other name: NICE 北京低碳清洁能源研究院 低碳院
- Parent institution: China Energy
- Established: December 2009; 16 years ago
- Focus: Renewable energy Carbon cycle and CCUS; Energy network Sustainability; Materials; Environmental protection Energy intelligence
- President: Zhao Zhe
- Staff: about 500
- Subsidiaries: State Key Laboratory of Water Resource Protection and Utilization in Coal Mining
- Location: Changping (Suburban Beijing), China
- Website: https://www.nicenergy.com/dtywwyw/index.shtml

The National Institute of Clean-and-Low-Carbon Energy (NICE) is a leading clean and renewable energy research institute located in China and affiliated with the China Energy. Established in 2009 and headquartered in the Changping's Future Science Park near Beijing, NICE also has R&D centers in Germany and California. NICE aims to drive innovation and collaboration in clean energy research, contributing to a sustainable future. It is home to the State Key Laboratory of Water Resource Protection and Utilization in Coal Mining.

With a team of about 500 researchers, the institute focuses on a range of areas, including carbon emission reduction, carbon neutrality, clean energy, coal chemical industry, hydrogen energy, energy storage technology, energy network, water treatment, environmental protection, global carbon cycle, smart energy, and energy-related applications of artificial intelligence. The advisory board features internationally recognized scientists such as Norman N. Li, Robin John Batterham, Robert Grubbs, Ke-Chang Xie, Uma Chowdhry, and Alexis T. Bell.

NICE collaborates closely with partner universities and institutions, including Tsinghua University, Sichuan University, China University of Petroleum, Tianjin University, Zhejiang University, Tongji University, Dalian University of Technology, China University of Mining and Technology, Eindhoven University of Technology, University of Pittsburgh, GE, Pacific Northwest National Laboratory, and Jacobs Consultancy, among others. Since its inception, NICE has undertaken 68 national-level research projects in China, published 67 national industry standards, and received 61 awards from national, provincial, and industry associations.

== R&D Centres ==
=== Beijing R&D Centre ===
The Beijing R&D Centre, which also serves as NICE's headquarters, is located in Changping (30 kilometers to central Beijing), with a campus covering 35 acres on the northern shore of the Wenyu River (and 53 additional adjacent acres shared with the Shenhua Management School that is affiliated with the same China Energy group). This R&D centre specializes in research related to the global carbon cycle, carbon emissions reduction, carbon neutrality, climate change, hydrogen energy, environmental protection, new energy storage technologies, advanced materials, water treatment, coal catalysts, deep earth geology, and energy intelligence that encompasses applied artificial intelligence and data science.

=== European R&D Centre ===
The European R&D Centre, located in Berlin, Germany, concentrates on renewable energy, innovative electric power systems, new chemical materials, carbon reduction technologies, and environmental solutions.

=== American R&D Centre ===
The American R&D Centre is based in the Silicon Valley, California. This centre focuses on shale gas catalysts, energy networks, carbon management, hydrogen energy, and additional related fields.

== Notable labs, centers, and programmes ==
- Postdoctoral programme host, China National Postdoctoral Council
- State Key Laboratory of Water Resource Protection and Utilization in Coal Mining
- Industrial Company Quality Management Model
- Technology Hub of National Energy Clean Coal Conversion and Utilization, China National Energy Administration
- Beijing Nanostructured Thin Film Solar Cell Engineering Technology Research Center
- Beijing Engineering Technology Research Center

== Academic journal ==
The institute operates the open-access academic journal of Clean Energy.
