= Future Science Park =

Science park in Beijing, China

The Future Science Park, also known as Future Science City, is situated along the Wenyu River in Changping, about 30 kilometers north of downtown Beijing. It is one of three major science parks in the metropolitan Beijing, designed to host campuses of high-tech companies and research institutes, thereby establishing a hub for science, technology, and innovation in China. Originally planned in 2009, it adopted its current name in 2017. The park is conveniently connected to downtown Beijing via Line 17 of the subway.

== General plan ==
Covering an area of 170.5 square kilometers, the Future Science Park is divided into three zones: east, west, and central. The eastern zone, with a core sector known as the Energy Valley, spans 41.8 square kilometers and is home to research institutes and companies focused on CCUS, energy storage, wind power, solar energy, hydrogen energy, electricity generation, climate change, and energy networks. This zone also features a service area for technological and cultural development. The western zone, covering 60.7 square kilometers, includes two main sectors. The southern sector, called Bio Valley, hosts various life science research institutes and national laboratories, while the northern sector is home to Shahe Higher Education Park, which has campuses of a number of universities, including Beihang University, Beijing Normal University, Beijing University of Posts and Telecommunications, Beijing Information Science and Technology University, and China University of Mining and Technology (Beijing). Between the eastern and western zones lies the central zone, measuring 63.8 square kilometers, primarily dedicated to natural and ecological reserves and urban green spaces.
