= Longyuan Power =

Wind power producer in China

China Longyuan Power Group Limited 龙源电力集团股份有限公司
- Company type: State-owned enterprise
- Traded as: SEHK: 916
- Industry: Wind power
- Founded: 1993
- Headquarters: Beijing, People's Republic of China
- Area served: People's Republic of China
- Key people: Chairman: Mr. Zhu Yongfan
- Revenue: HKD 26 Billion (2016); HKD 24.2 Billion (2016)
- Parent: China Guodian Corporation
- Website: China Longyuan Power Group Limited

China Longyuan Power Group Limited (SEHK: 916), or Longyuan Power, is the largest wind power producer in China and Asia. It is mainly engaged in designing, developing, managing and operating wind power plants, and selling the electricity generated by its plants to its sole customers. As of June 2013, the company had installed wind power plants with a total capacity of 10,661 MW.

Longyuan Power is a partially owned subsidiary of the state-owned China Energy Investment, and is responsible for China Energy's renewable energy assets. It had a 24 percent share of China's wind power market in terms of total installed capacity as of the end of 2008. It was listed on the Hong Kong Stock Exchange as H share in December 2009 with an IPO price of HK$8.16 per share.

== See also ==
- Wind power in China
