= Beijing Institute of Machinery =

Beijing University

Beijing Research Institute of Automation for Machinery Industry Co. Ltd (Chinese: 北京机械工业自动化研究所有限公司) (a.k.a. "RAIMB"; a.k.a. "RIAMB"), No. 1, Teaching Gate, Deshengmenwai, Xicheng District, Beijing 100120, China; Target Type State-Owned Enterprise; Registration Number 110000001661767 (China); Unified Social Credit Code (USCC) 91110102400000018P (China) [NPWMD].

One of the two universities that merged into Beijing Information Science & Technology University. Now, although the title of Beijing Institute of Machinery is no longer officially used, the school is considered half of the newly founded institution, Beijing Information Science & Technology University. The university takes engineering as its main faculty combined with management, liberal and science programs.
