= GD Power Development =

GD Power Development Company 国电电力发展股份
- Company type: listed
- Traded as: SSE: 600795
- Industry: Power generation
- Founded: 1992
- Headquarters: Beijing, China
- Area served: China
- Key people: Zhou Dabing (chairman)
- Website: GD Power Development Company

GD Power Development Company, or Guodian Power Development Company, the subsidiary of China Guodian Corporation, engages in the generation and supply of electric power and heat. It was founded in 1992 and was listed on the Shanghai Stock Exchange in 1997. It is headquartered in Beijing, China. On August 28, 2017, SASAC announced that China Guodian Corporation and Shenhua Group will be jointly restructured. Shenhua Group will become China Energy Investment Corporation and will absorb China Guodian Corporation.
