= Shenhua Watermark coal mine =

Proposed coal mine in New South Wales

- Location in Australia
- Location: Breeza, New South Wales, Australia; 31°15′00″S 150°28′00″E
- Products: Coal
- Company: Shenhua Group

The Shenhua Watermark coal mine was a proposed coal mine in the Liverpool Plains of New South Wales, Australia.

The project was to be located approximately 25 km south-east of the town of Gunnedah, near the village of Breeza and carried out by state-owned Chinese mining company Shenhua Group. Coal is to be shipped through the port of Newcastle.

The project was controversial because of the location in the Liverpool Plains, a primary agricultural region of Australia. It is named after the nearby Mount Watermark.

== Project ==
The project initially commenced in 2008 with the granting of an exploration licence, at the cost of A$300 million.

The project, valued at A$1 billion, once operational, was expected to extract 10 million tonnes of coal per year and have a 30-year live span. It was controversial because of its location, the Liverpool Plains, often described as the food bowl of Australia. It was to have covered 35 square kilometres and consist of three large extraction pits.

The project was conditionally approved by Federal Environmental Minister Greg Hunt but this approval was severely criticised by Federal Agriculture Minister Barnaby Joyce who was also the local MP for the area. Former Australian Prime Minister Tony Abbott pointed out that the mine is not located on fertile soil but rather on hill country.

In April 2021, the project ended when the New South Wales Government and the China Shenhua Energy Company Limited reached a $100 million agreement in which Shenhua withdrew its mining lease application and surrendered its development consent for the Shenhua Watermark Coal project.
