= Panjiang Investment Holdings =

Chinese coal mining company

- Industry: Coal mining
- Founded: 1966
- Headquarters: Guiyang, China
- Subsidiaries: Panjiang Refined Coal, Panjiang Coal and Electricity Refco Group
- Website: Panjiang Refined Coal website

Guizhou Panjiang Refined Coal Co., Ltd.
- Simplified Chinese: 贵州盘江精煤股份有限公司
- Traditional Chinese: 貴州盤江精煤股份有限公司
Transcriptions
Standard Mandarin
- Hanyu Pinyin: Guìzhōu Pán Jiāng Jīng Méi Gǔfènyǒuxiàngōngsī

Panjiang Investment Holdings Group, formerly known as Panjiang Coal and Electric Power Group (Chinese: 盤江煤電集團), is a coal mining and energy company in China.

== History ==
The company was founded in 1966 in Guiyang, Guizhou. The holding is engaged in the coal and related resources extraction (natural gas mostly), build materials, mechanical and electrical production and repairing, mining equipment maintenance, environmental protection, logistics, financial services, real estate and agricultural business operations.

Guizhou Panjiang Refined Coal is the largest company of the holding. It was founded in 1999 in Lupanshui and engaged mostly in extraction, processing and sale of coal in China and abroad. The company offers coking and injection coal for the metallurgical and chemical industries use; power coal for energy, cement and other industries.

The shares of the group's subsidiary, Panjiang Refined Coal, are traded on the Shanghai Stock Exchange.

The holding was reorganized in 2018 and in addition to Panjiang Coal and Electricity Group it embraced Panjiang Capital (earlier Panjiang Mining Bureau), Shuiming Group (earlier Shuicheng Mining Bureau), Liuzhi Industrial and Mining (earlier Liuzhi Mining Bureau), Lindong Mining (earlier Lindong Mining Bureau) and Panjiang Power Investment (earlier Guangtou Qiangui Company). In April 2020, Bijie Zhongcheng Energy Co. was entered the management of the group.

In 2019, the holding company made a profit of 800 million yuan ($120 million).

As of 2021, the holding has more than 50,000 employees.

== Operations ==
=== Coal mining ===
The holding is one of the largest coal producers in China.

In the early 2010s, its companies produced about 15 million tons of raw coal annually, constantly increasing the volume.

In 2021, the holding produced 1.7 million metric tons of thermal coal, which is 27 percent more than in 2020.

=== Coalbed methane extraction ===
In 2021, the holding produced 120 million cubic meters of natural gas, which is 63 percent of the total gas volume in the district.
