= Sieyuan Electric =

Chinese electrical equipment manufacturer

Sieyuan Electric Co., Ltd.
- Native name: 思源电气股份有限公司
- Type: Public
- Traded as: SZSE: 002028
- Industry: Electrical equipment
- Founded: December 1993; 32 years ago
- Founder: Dong Zengping
- Headquarters: Minhang District, Shanghai, China
- Area served: Worldwide
- Products: Switchgear, transformers, instrument transformers, capacitors, power electronics, battery energy storage systems
- Services: Engineering, procurement and construction
- Revenue: ▲CN¥21.54 billion (2025)
- Net income: ▲CN¥3.15 billion (2025)
- Website: en.sieyuan.com

Sieyuan Electric Co., Ltd. is a global manufacturer of power transmission and distribution equipment, headquartered in Shanghai. Its products range from high-voltage switchgear and transformers to substation automation systems and grid-scale battery energy storage, sold both to utility grid operators and, increasingly, to industry clients worldwide.

The company has traded on the Shenzhen Stock Exchange since 2004 under the code 002028. By December 2025 its shares had risen roughly 665 per cent over five years, giving it a market capitalisation of about CN¥118.4 — the second-largest among mainland-listed grid equipment makers — a run-up driven in large part by demand for grid upgrades tied to data centre and artificial intelligence build-outs. In February 2026 Sieyuan filed for a secondary listing on the Main Board of the Stock Exchange of Hong Kong.

== History ==
Sieyuan traces its origins to Shanghai Sieyuan Electric Co., Ltd., established in December 1993. It was reorganised as a joint-stock company in December 2000 and completed its initial public offering in Shenzhen in August 2004.

Chinese financial media credit Dong Zengping as the principal founder. A 2025 profile in Sina Finance describes Dong starting the business with classmates from Shanghai Jiao Tong University in a small laboratory, a venture that grew over three decades into a listed power equipment group.

Growth since the IPO has come partly through subsidiaries and acquisitions across adjacent product lines, including automation, low-voltage switchgear and, from the 2020s, energy storage manufacturing.

== Products and customers ==
Sieyuan organises its business into six lines: switchgear, transformers, protection and automation systems, power electronics, energy storage systems and components, and engineering, procurement and construction services. Its catalogue covers gas-insulated switchgear and circuit breakers rated up to 1100 kV, instrument transformers, power capacitors and reactors, and reactive power compensation equipment such as static var generators and active power filters.

Buyers include China's national grid companies, power generation groups, municipal utilities, rail transit operators, oil companies and heavy industrial users. The State Grid Corporation of China remains a significant counterparty; Daily Economic News has noted that the competitive tendering model used by these state buyers puts downward pressure on gross margins.

== Overseas expansion ==
Export sales have become the company's main growth engine. Sina Finance reported overseas revenue rising from CN¥2.158 billion in 2023 to CN¥3.123 billion in 2024, then to CN¥4.189 billion across the first three quarters of 2025 — from 17.3 per cent of turnover to 30.3 per cent.

That expansion has taken the form of localised manufacturing as well as exports. In December 2025 the Saudi firm Al Sharhan Energy signed a joint venture agreement with Sieyuan to build a high-voltage gas-insulated switchgear plant in Saudi Arabia, framed by the partners as a Saudi Vision 2030 local-content project.

== Energy storage ==
In October 2022, Sieyuan Electric invested in the establishment of a subsidiary in Shanghai to enter the residential solar and energy storage market. Its Swatten brand supplies hybrid solar inverters and battery energy storage systems for residential and small commercial use.

Sieyuan entered a supply relationship with battery maker CATL in 2022. On 25 December 2025 the two signed a three-year memorandum targeting 50 GWh of cumulative cooperation, covering both storage systems and the transmission and distribution equipment that accompanies them, under a "dual-sourcing" procurement arrangement.

The company has since pursued utility-scale storage contracts in Europe and the Middle East. In March 2026 the Romanian electricity supplier Alive Capital signed a memorandum of understanding with Sieyuan covering up to 2.5 GWh of battery storage deployment over four years, one of a series of large Romanian storage deals concluded that month. Trade publication EnergyTrend put Sieyuan's combined announced overseas storage pipeline at 4.5 GWh, adding a 2 GWh project in Oman to the Romanian volume.

== Hong Kong listing ==
Sieyuan's board approved a plan to issue H shares in Hong Kong on 15 December 2025, proposing new stock equal to no more than 15 per cent of its 778 million outstanding shares. No timetable or fundraising target was given in the filing. A Citibank strategist quoted by the South China Morning Post estimated the offering might raise as much as CN¥20 billion (US$2.84 billion) in the second half of 2026, which would have made it one of Hong Kong's largest listings of the period.

The application was submitted to the exchange on 11 February 2026 with CITIC Securities as sole sponsor. Proceeds were earmarked for capacity expansion, research and development, overseas service networks, digital systems, strategic investment and working capital. Reviewing the filing, Daily Economic News flagged CN¥541 million of goodwill on the balance sheet and margin pressure from competitive bidding as risks to the growth story. Sina Finance separately questioned whether the company's heavy capital expenditure programme would translate into earnings.
