= Shenhua Group =

Chinese coal company

- Type: State-owned enterprise
- Industry: Energy
- Predecessor: Huaneng Coal Corporation
- Founded: 1995
- Defunct: 2017
- Fate: Merged with China Guodian
- Successor: China Energy Investment
- Headquarters: Beijing, China
- Area served: China
- Key people: Chairman: Zhang Yuzhuo
- Products: Coal, electricity, transportation (rail and ocean), polyethylene, polypropylene
- Services: Coal production, transportation, Electricity generation
- Owner: Chinese Central Government
- Number of employees: ~210,000
- Parent: SASAC
- Subsidiaries: China Shenhua Energy

Chinese name
- Simplified Chinese: 神华集团有限责任公司
- Traditional Chinese: 神華集團有限責任公司
Transcriptions
Standard Mandarin
- Hanyu Pinyin: Shénhuá Jítuán Yǒuxiàn Zérèn Gōngsī

Chinese short name
- Simplified Chinese: 神华集团
- Traditional Chinese: 神華集團
Transcriptions
Standard Mandarin
- Hanyu Pinyin: Shénhuá Jítuán
- Website: shenhuagroup.com.cn

Shenhua Group Corporation Limited was a Chinese state-owned mining and energy company. Shenhua Group was founded in October 1995 under the auspices of the State Council of the People's Republic of China. It was the largest coal-producing company in China. In 2014 Shenhua Group produced 437 million tons of coal and sold 588 million tons of coal. In 2014, Shenhua Group's revenue was 328.6 billion yuan (~US$53 billion), and the company ranked 196th in the Global Fortune 500. The same year the Shenhua Group's profit was 64 billion yuan (~US$10 billion). On August 28, 2017, SASAC announced that China Guodian Corporation and Shenhua Group would be jointly restructured, with Shenhua Group becoming China Energy Investment Corporation and absorbing China Guodian Corporation.

== History ==
The predecessor of the company was a subsidiary of China Huaneng Group, called 华能精煤公司 (sometimes translated as Huaneng Coal Corporation). China Huaneng Group was founded in 1989 as a holding company for a series of companies that were founded in the 1980s for a "coal for petroleum" project, replacing the use of petroleum to coal in power plants. In 1993, China Huaneng Group was under the dual directorship of the Ministry of Power Industry and the State Planning Committee, both departments of the State Council of the People's Republic of China. Previously China Huaneng Group was under the sole directorship of the State Planning Committee. In 1995, Shenhua Group was founded as a separate corporation under the provisional directorship of the State Planning Committee. After the formation of the State-owned Assets Supervision and Administration Commission of the State Council (SASAC), Shenhua Group was under the direct supervision of SASAC until the 2017 merger, where the new China Energy Investment was under direct SASAC supervision instead.

Shenhua Group had a major subsidiary and listed company China Shenhua Energy. However, some of the assets remained unlisted.

== Operations ==
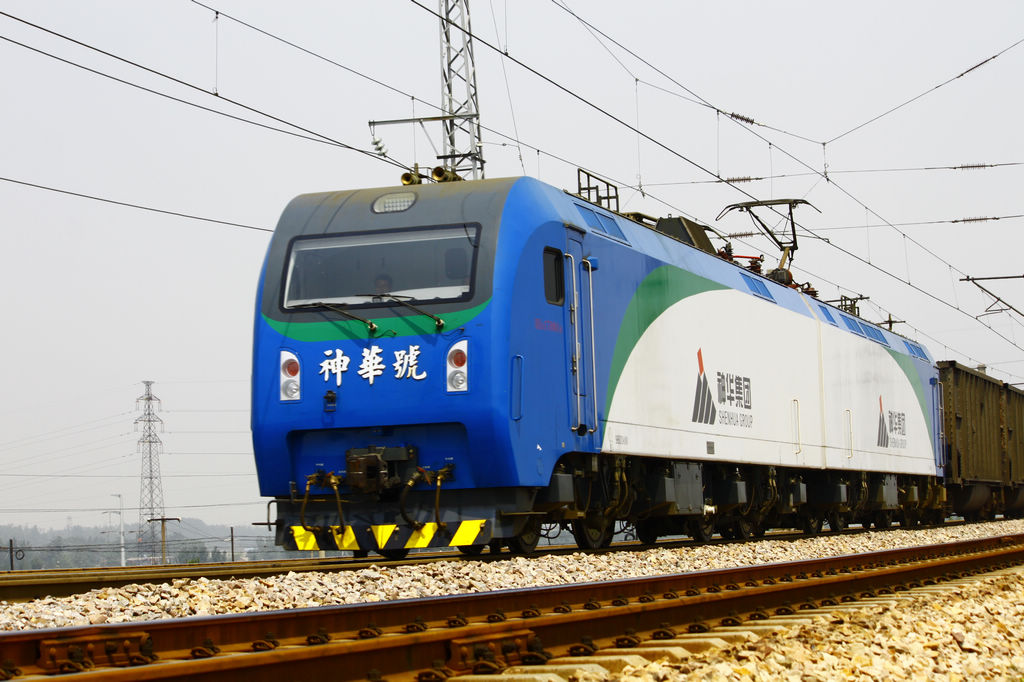
An electric locomotive operated by the Shenhua Group

Shenhua Group is vertically integrated and, in addition to coal mining, the company also produces electricity from coal and renewable energy, operates railroads, ports, and seaborne shipments, produces polyethylene and polypropylene, and undertakes research, development, and demonstrations activities.

=== Coal mining ===
Shenhua Group was the largest coal producer in China, operating both underground and open cut mines. In 2014, the company sold about 588 million tonnes of coal, the vast majority of which was mined by Shenhua subsidiaries. In 2014, Shenhua invested a total of US$37 million in conservation of soil and water and environmental remediation. Afforestation areas were expanded by over 25 square kilometres (6,200 acres) in 2014.

Shenhua had implemented smart mining technologies. In 2013, the company was awarded the World Coal Association Award for Leadership on Mining Safety.

In 2014, the company transported coal on its railways at a rate of 224 billion tonnes·km. Shenhua owned three ports and worked with third party ports that were used to transport about 235.8 million tonnes of coal by sea in 2014.

=== Electricity generation ===
Shenhua's total power output dispatch was 324.6 TWh in 2014, most of this electricity was generated using coal. The company completed the desulfurization (de-SOx) retrofits to all of its coal-fired power generators. Shenhua Guohua, one of Shenhua Group's largest electricity-generating subsidiaries, implemented a program to achieve near-zero emissions at its coal-fired power plants. The company has committed to emissions of PM, SOx, and NOx that are at or below the standards set for natural gas power plants.

The company held more than 5,000 MW of renewable energy capacity and was the sixth largest producer of electricity from wind in China. Shenhua also planned to build wind farms in Australia.

=== Fuels and chemicals production ===
Shenhua owned and operated facilities that convert coal to products through indirect coal liquefaction and direct coal liquefaction. Shenhua's direct liquefaction plant was the largest such facility in the world. In 2014, the facility produced 900,000 tonnes of liquid fuels and products, including diesel, naphtha, and liquefied petroleum gas.

Shenhua owned and operated three coal to olefins projects. The production capacity of these facilities was about 1.6 million tonnes per year.

=== Innovation ===
Shenhua has had several research projects related to the water-energy nexus. The company developed and demonstrated the concept of recycling and purifying mine water so that underground mines with distributed reservoirs can become net water producers and provide water to the surrounding community and industries. This has been demonstrated at Shenhua's Daliuta coal mine in the Shendong mining area.

Shenhua researched and developed reducing the water consumption of coal conversion processes.

== Subsidiaries ==
The company has more than 30 subsidiaries, including:

- Shenhua Shendong Coal Group Co., Ltd
- Shenhua Railway Development Co., Ltd.
- Shaanxi Guohua Jinjie Energy Co., Ltd.
- Shenhua Trading Group Ltd.
- Guangdong Guohua Yudean Taishan Power Co., Ltd.
- Zhejiang Guohua Zheneng Power Generation Co., Ltd.
- Shenhua Zhunge’er Energy Co., Ltd.
- Shenhua Railway Transportation Co., Ltd.
- Hebei Guohua Cangdong Power Co., Ltd.
- Hebei Guohua Dingzhou Power Generation Co., Ltd.

Shenhua Group's subsidiary China Shenhua Energy Company is listed at the Hong Kong Stock Exchange and Shanghai Stock Exchange.

== Issues ==
=== Water ===
According to Greenpeace in July 2013 Shenhua Group reduced groundwater levels in an Inner Mongolia region and discharged high levels of toxic wastewater.

=== Australian mine ===
The group planned to build the A$1 billion Shenhua Watermark coal mine in the Liverpool Plains in New South Wales, Australia. The Liverpool Plains are primary agricultural land and the mine has sparked controversy within Australia.
