= China Guodian Corporation =

Chinese power corporation

China Guodian Corporation 中国国电集团公司
- Type: State-owned enterprise
- Industry: Electricity
- Founded: 2002
- Fate: Merged with Shenhua Group
- Successor: China Energy Investment Corporation
- Headquarters: Beijing, China
- Area served: China
- Key people: Zhu Yongpeng (Chairman)
- Products: Electrical power
- Revenue: $ 27.315 billion (2017)
- Total assets: $ 114.611 billion (2017)
- Total equity: 7,496 million (2017)
- Number of employees: 124,056 (2017)
- Parent: SASAC
- Subsidiaries: Longyuan Power and GD Power Development
- Website: China Guodian Corporation

China Guodian Corporation (Guodian; Chinese: 国电) is one of the five largest power producers in China, administrated by SASAC for the State Council. It is engaged in development, investment, construction, operation and management of power plants and power generation for electricity supply in Northern China, Northeast China, Central China, East China. Sichuan and Chongqing, Shandong, Yunnan, Guizhou, Guangxi, and Xinjiang, as well as in Myanmar. The installed capacity of company power plants is exceeding 100,000 MWe. On August 28, 2017, SASAC announced that China Guodian Corporation and Shenhua Group will be jointly restructured. Shenhua Group will become China Energy Investment Corporation and will absorb China Guodian Corporation.

Guodian is involved in developing renewable energy projects.

== Subsidiaries ==
A summary of the corporate structure may be found on page 4 of the document.

=== Listed subsidiaries ===
- Guodian Power Development Company Limited (SSE: 600795), which is listed on the Shanghai Stock Exchange, is the Group's major thermal power subsidiary.
- China Longyuan Power (SEHK 00916) - runs the group's wind farms.
- Guodian Changyuan Electric Power (SZSE: 000966)
- Inner Mongolia Pingzhuang Energy (SZSE: 000780)
- Ningxia Younglight Chemicals (SZSE: 000635)
- Guodian Technology & Environment Group (SEHK: 01296)

=== Unlisted subsidiaries ===
Guodian United Power is responsible for the development and manufacture of wind turbines.

They mainly produce onshore wind turbines of size 1500 kW (designed by the German development company aerodyn Energiesysteme GmbH). In addition there a new turbines 2MW, 3MW, and a 6MW offshore turbine in development.

They are among the top wind turbine manufacturers by annual market share (November 8, 2012).

Old Mutual – Guodian is an insurance company.

== Insurance business ==
China Guodian Corporation is setting up a property insurance company in Beijing to diversify the business into other areas, trying to aid its move towards becoming more comprehensive energy conglomerate. China Guodian will hold the majority stake in the proposed new insurance company, whose registered capital is expected to reach 1 billion yuan ($146 million).

In the first half of 2008, China Guodian invested in a life insurance company. Later in September, the group purchased a 19.6 percent stake in a city commercial bank in Shijiazhuang, the capital city of Hebei province, becoming the bank's largest shareholder.

Prior to China Guodian, the State Grid Corp and several other energy groups also expanded their businesses to the financial sector. They have established a number of insurance companies and hold stakes in securities and futures brokerages.

== Equity investments ==
- UBS Securities (14%)

== See also ==
- Economy of China
- Industry of China
