= Beijing Information Science and Technology University =

University in China

- 北京信息科技大学
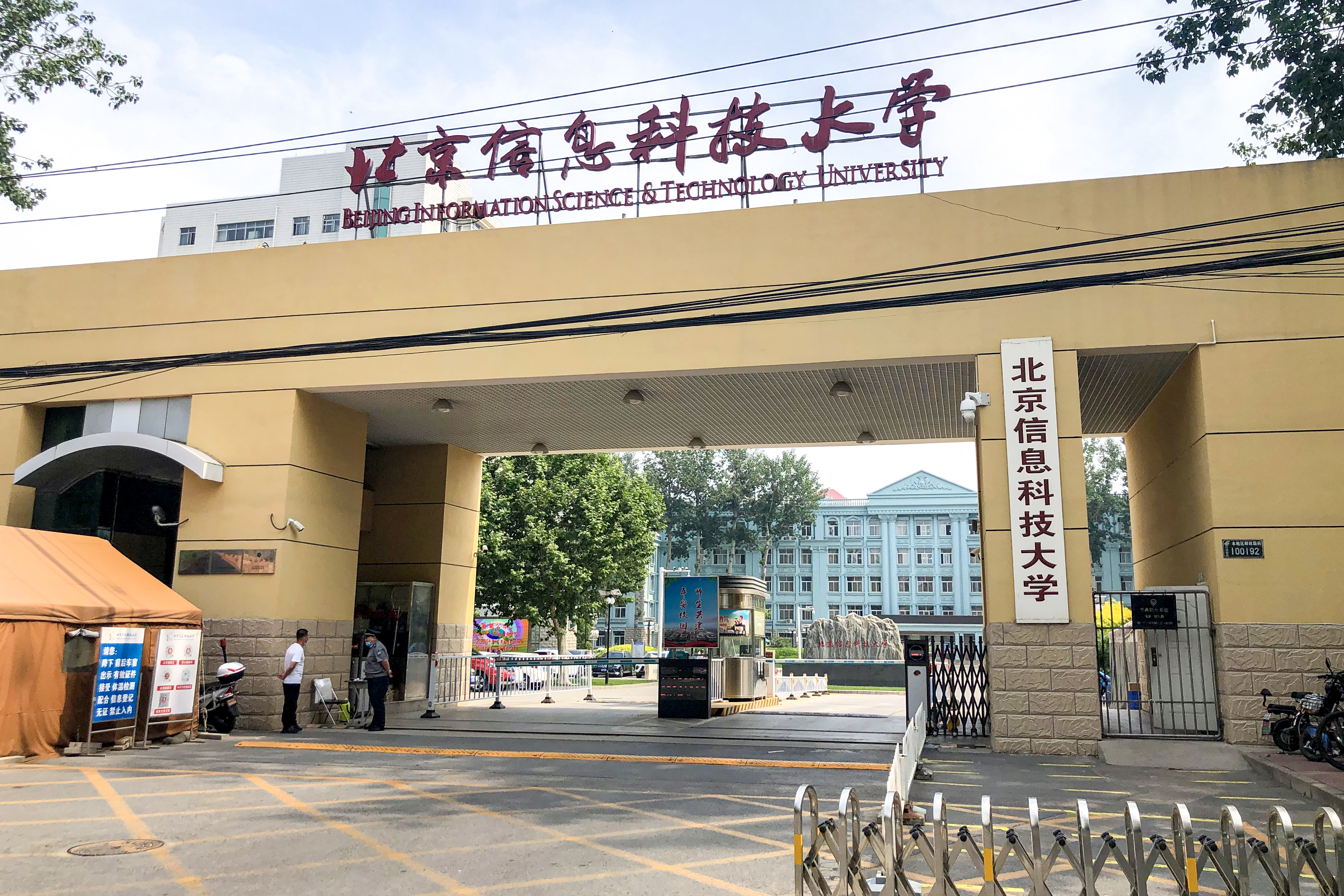
- Other names: 信息科大, 北信
- Motto: 勤以为学 信以立身
- Motto in English: Diligence in learning, honor for life
- Type: National
- Established: 1937; 89 years ago
- President: Wang Yongsheng (王永生)
- Academic staff: 1395
- Undergraduates: 10665
- Postgraduates: 1100
- Location: Beijing, China; 40°02′14″N 116°20′25″E
- Website: www.bistu.edu.cn

Beijing Information Science and Technology University (BISTU) is a school of higher education and a merger in founding process of Beijing Institute of Machinery and Beijing Information Technology Institute. The university takes engineering as its main faculty combined with management, liberal and science programs. It is a member of the Plan 111.

== Schools and departments ==
- School of Information and Communication Engineering
- School of Computer Science and Technology
- School of Mechanical and Electronic Engineering
- School of Instrument Science and Optic Engineering
- School of Automation Engineering
- School of Human and Social Science
- School of Politic Philosophy and Education
- School of Economics Management
- School of Information Administration
- School of Foreign Languages
- School of Sciences
- Graduate School
