= CHN Energy Investment Group =

Chinese mining and energy company

- Native name: 国家能源投资集团有限责任公司
- Type: State-owned enterprise
- Industry: Energy
- Predecessor: Shenhua Group; China Guodian Corporation
- Founded: 2017; 9 years ago
- Headquarters: Beijing, China
- Area served: China
- Products: Coal, Electrical power, transportation (rail and ocean), polyethylene, polypropylene
- Services: Coal production, transportation, Electricity generation
- Revenue: US$ 112.0 billion (2023)
- Net income: US$ 6.3 billion (2023)
- Total assets: US$ 294.9 billion (2023)
- Owner: Chinese central government (100%)
- Number of employees: 309,037 (2023)
- Subsidiaries: National Institute of Clean-and-Low-Carbon Energy
- Website: ceic.com

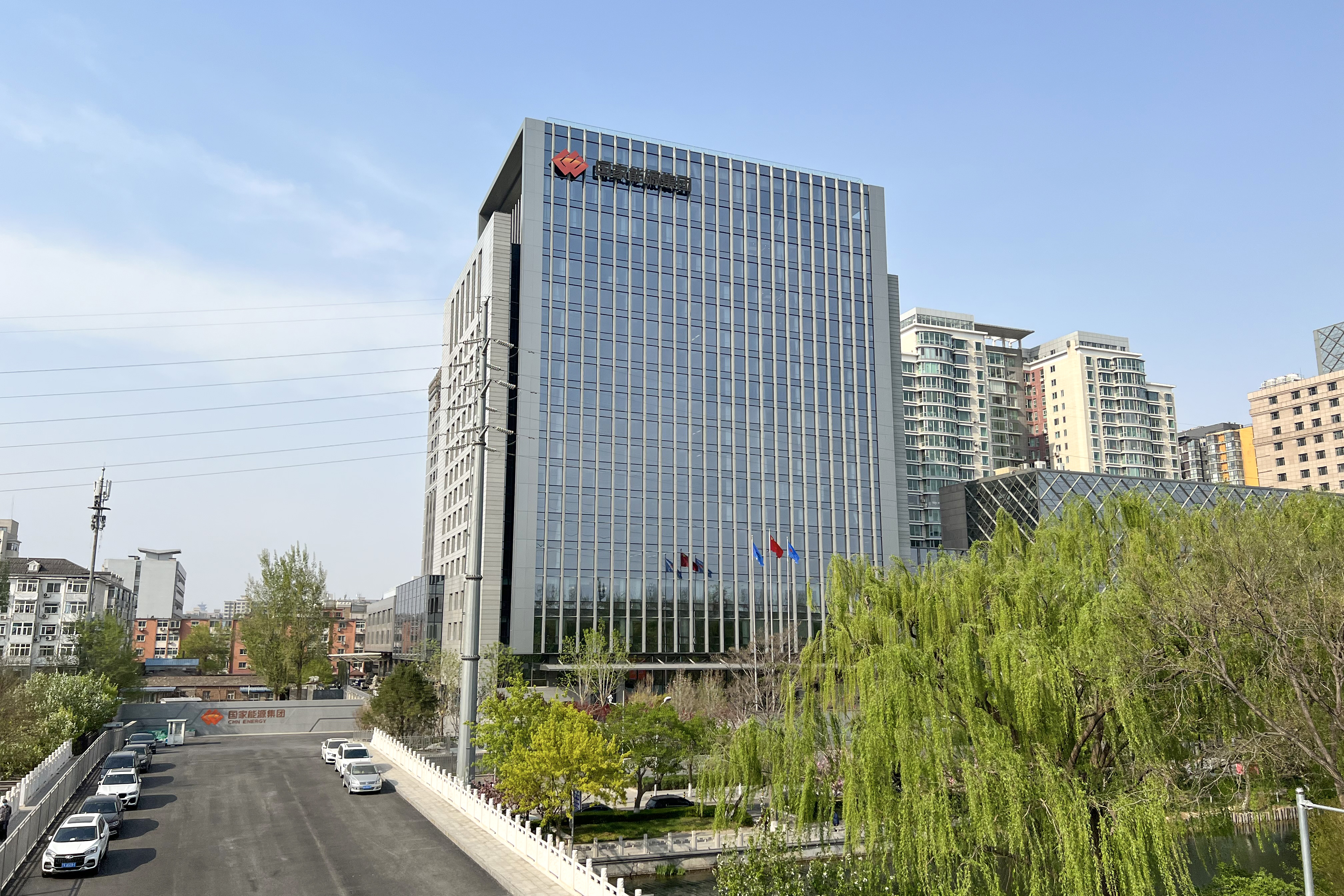
Headquarters

CHN Energy Investment Group (branded as CHN Energy) is a state-owned mining and energy company administrated by the State-owned Assets Supervision and Administration Commission of the State Council.

In 2024, CHN Energy was responsible for 1,509 Mt of CO_{2} emissions, which was 3.91% of global CO_{2} emissions.

== History ==
On August 28, 2017, SASAC announced that China Guodian Corporation and Shenhua Group will be jointly restructured. Shenhua Group will become China Energy Investment Corporation Limited and will absorb China Guodian Corporation. It will be the largest power company in the world by installed capacity.

== Operations ==
China Energy is engaged in development, investment, construction, operation and management of power plants and power generation for electricity supply in China. It also mines coal; operates railroads, ports and seaborne shipments; produces polyethylene and polypropylene; and undertakes research, development, and demonstrations activities.
