= Death of Zhu Rongji =

2026 death of former Chinese premier

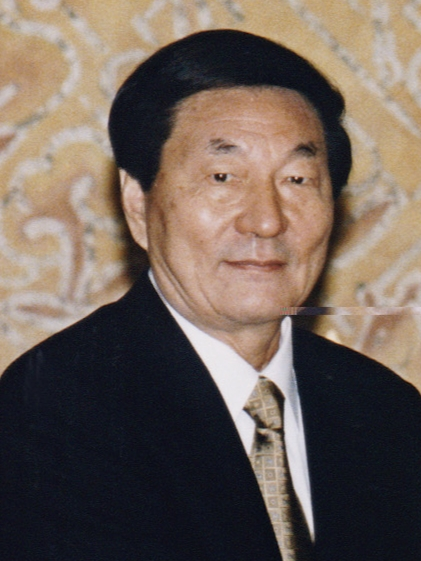
- Zhu in 2000
- Date: 12 August 2026
- Location: Beijing, China

Zhu Rongji, former Premier of the State Council and member of the Politburo Standing Committee of the Chinese Communist Party, died in Beijing, China, at 11:06 a.m. Beijing Time on August 12, 2026, at the age of 97. That evening, the Central Committee of the Chinese Communist Party, the Standing Committee of the National People's Congress, the State Council, and the National Committee of the Chinese People's Political Consultative Conference jointly issued an official obituary.

== Background ==
=== Retirement from party and government positions ===
Zhu Rongji stepped down from the Politburo Standing Committee of the Chinese Communist Party following the conclusion of the 16th National Congress of the Chinese Communist Party in November 2002. He formally stepped down as Premier of the State Council after the conclusion of the First Session of the 10th National People's Congress in March 2003, ending his leadership career in the Chinese economic system and entering retirement. After his retirement, Zhu lived a largely low-profile life and rarely discussed politics or participated in government affairs in public. The official obituary stated that after leaving his leadership positions, he continued to firmly support and uphold the Hu Jintao-led Party Central Committee, with Hu serving as General Secretary, as well as the Party Central Committee with Xi Jinping as its core leader and continued to support efforts to strengthen Party discipline and integrity and combat corruption.

After his retirement, Zhu rarely appeared in public, primarily appearing at selected commemorative events and activities associated with his alma mater.. He attended the 90th anniversary of the founding of the Chinese Communist Party in 2011 and the opening ceremony of the 19th National Congress of the Chinese Communist Party in October 2017. Zhu previously served as the founding dean and honorary chairman of the Advisory Board of the School of Economics and Management, Tsinghua University. After his retirement, many of his public appearances were associated with the school. His final known public appearance at an in-person event took place in Beijing in October 2018, when he met members of the Advisory Board of Tsinghua University's School of Economics and Management, around the time of his 90th birthday.. In subsequent years, Zhu did not attend several major Party and state commemorative events, including the 70th anniversary of the founding of the People's Republic of China in 2019, the 100th anniversary celebration of the founding of the Chinese Communist Party in 2021, the 20th National Congress of the Chinese Communist Party in 2022 and the 2025 China Victory Day Parade.

=== Health ===
After his last public appearance at an in-person event in October 2018, Zhu Rongji rarely left his residence due to his health and, apart from receiving medical treatment at hospitals, almost completely ceased appearing in public. His medical care and daily life were reportedly coordinated by the General Office of the Central Committee of the Chinese Communist Party's Retired Cadres Bureau, which arranged for dedicated secretaries and nurses to care for him. During Zhu's 92nd birthday in October 2020, a photograph circulated on social media showing him wearing red clothing inside a hospital, with several medical staff nearby preparing a cake to celebrate his birthday. His wife, Lao An, was also pictured accompanying him. Based on the photograph, his condition appeared to be relatively good at the time.

Because of his prolonged absence from public view, reports and rumors concerning his health periodically circulated on the overseas social media platform X. During the annual meeting of the Advisory Board of the School of Economics and Management, Tsinghua University on October 25, 2024, Zhu reportedly asked university president Li Luming to convey his greetings to members of the advisory board and invited experts. When the board held its 26th annual meeting on 17 October 2025, the 97-year-old Zhu again asked the university president to convey his greetings, which also attracted public attention. According to people close to Zhu's family, he lived in a siheyuan in Beijing during his later years and was bedridden for an extended period. His physical condition deteriorated significantly in the period preceding his death, and he developed difficulty eating. He was subsequently taken to hospital for emergency treatment and died several days later after treatment proved ineffective.

== Funeral arrangements ==
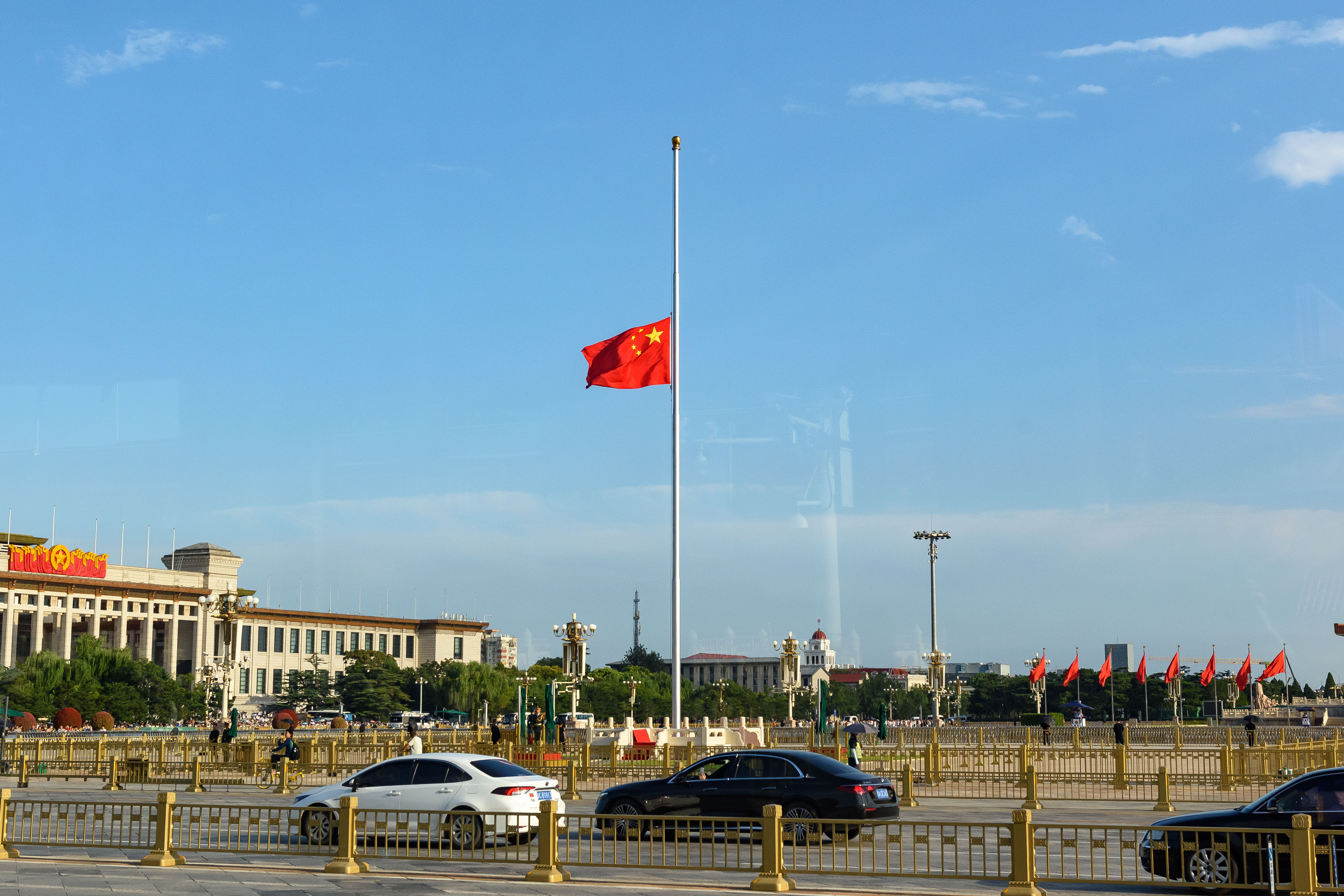
National flag of China at half mast at Tian'anmen Square on the day of Zhu's funeral, 18 August 2026

=== Announcement of death ===
At 6:00 p.m. Beijing Time on 12 August 2026, the Xinhua News Agency, the official news agency of the People's Republic of China, was authorized to release an official obituary jointly issued by the Central Committee of the Chinese Communist Party, the Standing Committee of the National People's Congress, the State Council and the National Committee of the Chinese People's Political Consultative Conference. China Central Television also formally reported Zhu Rongji's death during the 7:00 p.m. broadcast of Xinwen Lianbo that evening. The obituary stated that Zhu Rongji had “died in Beijing at 11:06 a.m. on August 12, 2026, after treatment for illness proved ineffective, at the age of 98”, (Note: certain CCP obituaries, in an unique way of calculation would round one year up onto the age officially, often when the person’s passing predates one’s birthday in the same calendar year; such age expression is occasionally seen among its senior-most party and state leaders. Zhu was in fact 97 at the time of his passing.) and also released his official portrait.

The official obituary gave Zhu Rongji a highly positive political assessment, describing him as “an outstanding member of the Chinese Communist Party, a tested and loyal communist fighter, an outstanding proletarian revolutionary and statesman, and an outstanding leader of the Party and the state”, and summarizing his life as “a life of revolution, a life of struggle, and a glorious life”. The obituary also detailed Zhu's life and career, placing particular emphasis on his role during China's crucial transition from a planned economy to a socialist market economy. It highlighted his role in advancing reforms in taxation and fiscal policy, finance, state-owned enterprises, housing, and grain circulation, as well as his role in completing negotiations for China's accession to the World Trade Organization. It also specifically praised his “deep affection for the people” and his approach to public service, including his insistence that officials “dare to speak the truth, not fear offending people, and not seek special privileges”.

=== Funeral ===
On August 18, Zhu's funeral was held at Babaoshan Revolutionary Cemetery in Beijing where he was also cremated. According to Xinhua, all seven members of the CCP Politburo Standing Committee (including CCP General Secretary Xi Jinping and Premier Li Qiang) as well as Vice President Han Zheng paid their final respects. Former CCP General Secretary Hu Jintao also sent a wreath, and flags were flown at half-mast.

== Reactions ==
=== Mainland China ===
==== Official ====
Following the release of the official obituary, Xinhua News Agency, China Media Group and other Chinese state-run media outlets gave prominent coverage to Zhu Rongji's death, while major newspapers also published reports and photographs of him during his lifetime on their front pages or prominent news sections. The official obituary praised Zhu's contributions to reforms in taxation, finance, and state-owned enterprises during the administration of Jiang Zemin, and called on the Party and the people to “turn grief into strength” and unite more closely around the Party Central Committee with Xi Jinping at its core.

On 18 August, the Tiananmen Square, Xinhua Gate, Great Hall of the People and Ministry of Foreign Affairs, as well as the seats of Party and government authorities in all provinces, autonomous regions, and municipalities, the Hong Kong Special Administrative Region, the Macao Special Administrative Region, border checkpoints, international seaports and airports, and Chinese embassies and consulates abroad, will lower their flags to half-mast in mourning.

==== Society ====
News of Zhu Rongji's death prompted widespread discussion and mourning among the public and on social media in mainland China. Following the announcement of his death, the news quickly became the top trending search on platforms including Sina Weibo, with related topics accumulating more than 190 million views within several hours. Numerous users left messages of condolence and candle symbols in mourning. Many users and commentators revisited aspects of Zhu's political style during his tenure, including his widely circulated anti-corruption remark, “Prepare 100 coffins, 99 for corrupt officials and one for myself”, as well as his description of collapsed dams during the 1998 Yangtze floods as “tofu-dreg projects”. At the same time, against the backdrop of slowing Chinese economic growth, some members of the public and commentators viewed the “Jiang–Zhu era” as a period of faster-paced reform and relatively greater openness in social thought. Through recollections of Zhu's image as a politician who “dared to speak the truth and was not afraid of offending people”, they expressed nostalgia for the period.

Other discussions on social media focused on the social effects and costs of Zhu's reform policies, with particular controversy surrounding the large-scale layoff wave resulting from the “grasp the large, let go of the small” restructuring of state-owned enterprises in the late 1990s. Media reports citing comments on platforms including Weibo and Threads said that the reforms caused tens of millions of state-owned enterprise workers and their families to lose their former employment and social security, resulting in prolonged financial pressure and psychological effects. Critical expressions such as “Zhu opens his mouth, workers lose their jobs” subsequently circulated among the public. At the same time, some internet users and descendants of affected workers expressed support for Zhu's decision to advance China's accession to the World Trade Organization, arguing that it created long-term opportunities for China's economic development and labor market.

In Zhu's hometown of Changsha, some members of the public also voluntarily visited his ancestral residence on August 13 to lay flowers in mourning.

=== Hong Kong ===
Following the announcement of Zhu Rongji's death, there were varying expressions of mourning and reflection within Hong Kong's political circles and wider public discourse. Some focused on his policy positions toward Hong Kong's financial markets and economic development during his tenure. Chief Executive John Lee Ka-chiu issued a statement that evening expressing deep sorrow and said that Zhu had consistently cared about and supported Hong Kong's development, particularly by providing support when Hong Kong faced major economic challenges such as the 1997 Asian financial crisis. Former Chief Executives Donald Tsang, Leung Chun-ying and Financial Secretary Paul Chan Mo-po, along with several Legislative Council members and other political figures, also posted messages of condolence on social media and reflected on Hong Kong's economic and social conditions during Zhu's tenure. Hong Kong public discourse concerning Zhu's relationship with Hong Kong primarily focused on his position on maintaining Hong Kong's status as an international financial centre during his tenure.

Zhu remained relatively well known among the Hong Kong public after his retirement. According to the Hong Kong Public Opinion Research Institute, in its last published “Cross-Strait Political Figures Popularity Ranking” in January 2023, Zhu remained at the top of the ranking 12 consecutive years and for the 22nd time overall, despite having retired many years earlier. The result was cited as reflecting the views of some Hong Kong residents toward his governing style and policies toward Hong Kong.

=== Macao ===
Chief Executive Sam Hou Fai issued a statement expressing his condolences, emphasizing that the people of Macao would always remember Zhu Rongji's concern for and longstanding support of Macao's development.

=== Taiwan ===
Following news of Zhu Rongji's death, political figures and public opinion in Taiwan primarily reflected on several points of interaction between Zhu and Taiwan's political development, with particular attention given to his remarks concerning Taiwan made in the run-up to the 2000 presidential election. Taiwanese public discourse also assessed Zhu's policies and influence from the perspective of cross-Strait economic and trade relations. Some Taiwanese businesspeople and investors described Zhu as “the best chief steward” and praised his policies on macroeconomic management, the development of Pudong, and China's accession to the World Trade Organization, arguing that these measures provided Taiwanese businesses investing in mainland China at an early stage with greater market and investment opportunities and had a lasting influence on the subsequent development of cross-strait economic and trade relations.

=== International ===
==== Heads of state, governments and political parties ====
Following Zhu Rongji's death, government leaders and foreign affairs officials from several countries expressed their condolences to the Chinese government.

- Australia: Prime Minister Anthony Albanese, on behalf of the Australian government and people, issued a statement expressing condolences and praised Zhu's achievements in advancing China's modern market economy and his contribution to deepening the economic partnership between Australia and China.
- Cambodia: Senate President Hun Sen sent a letter to Zhu's family to express his condolences, saying that Zhu was a friend of Cambodia while mentioning Zhu's announcement of cancellation of all of Cambodia's debts during his visit to Cambodia in 2002, which helped the country's post-war reconstruction.
- Japan: The Ministry of Foreign Affairs announced on August 13 that Prime Minister Sanae Takaichi had sent messages of condolence to Xi Jinping and Li Qiang following Zhu Rongji's death, recalling and praising Zhu's contribution to the development of China–Japan relations. Foreign Minister Toshimitsu Motegi also expressed condolences to Chinese Foreign Minister Wang Yi. The Embassy of Japan in China also lowered its flag to half-mast that morning and published photographs of the flag at half-mast on its official social media accounts in mourning.
- South Korea: South Korean Ambassador to China Roh Jae-heon posted a message of condolences on social media on August 13, recalling Zhu's visit to South Korea in October 2000, his meeting with then-President Kim Dae-jung, and his role in promoting the development of China–South Korea relations.
- Malaysia: Prime Minister Anwar Ibrahim posted a message of condolence, stating that the reform policies implemented by Zhu during his tenure had accelerated China's remarkable rise as an economic superpower.
- Pakistan: President Asif Ali Zardari and Prime Minister Shehbaz Sharif separately issued statements and messages of condolence, describing Zhu as a close friend of Pakistan and extending condolences to Xi Jinping, Li Qiang, the Chinese people and Zhu's family. They praised Zhu's historic contribution to strengthening the China–Pakistan strategic partnership. National Assembly Speaker Ayaz Sadiq and Deputy Prime Minister and Foreign Minister Ishaq Dar also issued statements expressing deep sorrow.
- Qatar: Prime Minister and Minister of Foreign Affairs Mohammed bin Abdulrahman bin Jassim Al-Thani sent a cable of condolences to Li Qiang in regard to Zhu's death.
- Saudi Arabia: King Salman bin Abdulaziz Al Saud and Crown Prince and Prime Minister Mohammed bin Salman separately sent messages of condolence to Xi Jinping, expressing deep sorrow over Zhu's death and extending condolences to Zhu's family and the Chinese people.
- Singapore: Prime Minister Lawrence Wong wrote to Premier of the State Council Li Qiang on August 13, conveying condolences to the Chinese people on behalf of the Singaporean government. He praised Zhu for his exceptional vision and determination in advancing economic reforms and leading China into the World Trade Organization, describing him as an “old friend” of Singapore. Wong also recalled Zhu's support for the development of the China–Singapore Suzhou Industrial Park and his numerous meetings and interactions with Singaporean leaders including Lee Kuan Yew and Goh Chok Tong, as well as his important role in deepening economic ties between ASEAN and China. Deputy Prime Minister Gan Kim Yong visited the Embassy of the People's Republic of China on 17 August to signed his name on their condolence book; he noted that Singapore will be remembered on Zhu's recognized contributions.
- United Arab Emirates: President Mohammed bin Zayed Al Nahyan, Vice President and Prime Minister Mohammed bin Rashid Al Maktoum and Vice President Mansour bin Zayed Al Nahyan sent messages to Xi Jinping to express their condolences on Zhu's death.
- United States: United States Ambassador to China David Perdue posted a bilingual message of condolence on X on 14 August, expressing sorrow on behalf of the United States over Zhu's death and extending condolences to his family, the Chinese government, and the Chinese people.
- Vietnam: General Secretary of the Communist Party of Vietnam and President of Vietnam Tô Lâm, Prime Minister Lê Minh Hưng, National Assembly Chairman Trần Thanh Mẫn and Permanent Secretary of the Secretariat of the Communist Party of Vietnam Trần Cẩm Tú separately sent messages of condolence to Xi Jinping, Li Qiang, Zhao Leji and Cai Qi on 14 August. Vietnamese Foreign Minister Lê Hoài Trung also called Wang Yi to express condolences. In their messages, the Vietnamese side recalled Zhu's role in advancing China's reform and opening-up and integration into the global economy, and referred to his influence on the development of China–Vietnam relations in the early 21st century.

=== Other individuals ===
- Bo Guagua, the son of disgraced Chinese politician Bo Xilai, posted a tribute to Zhu where he stated that Bo Xilai regarded Zhu Rongji as a role model and greatly admired his reformist approach of remaining dedicated to his duties—“devoting oneself completely and dying only after one’s work is done”—despite operating in a complex political environment and refusing to be influenced by outside noise. He also said that the phrase “eternal and immortal” was fully deserving when applied to Zhu Rongji.
- Tim Cook, CEO of Apple Inc., who served for many years as a member and chairman of the Advisory Board of Tsinghua University’s School of Economics and Management, posted a message honoring Zhu on Weibo where he stated that Zhu left behind an extraordinary legacy and that his outstanding contributions were too numerous to enumerate. Cook also recalled the multiple occasions on which the two had met and interacted during Zhu’s lifetime.
- Thaksin Shinawatra, former Prime Minister of Thailand, issued a statement expressing his condolences. He recalled his interactions with Zhu and highlighted Zhu’s role in guiding China’s economic development and its integration into the global economy and trade system.
- Jean-Pierre Raffarin, former Prime Minister of France, issued a eulogy, recalling his experience of jointly receiving Zhu's visit to France with then French President Jacques Chirac in September 2002 and affirming his contribution to promoting Sino-French relations and multilateralism.
