= Zhu Rongji =

Premier of China from 1998 to 2003

- 朱镕基
- Zhu in 2000

Premier of China
- In office 17 March 1998 – 16 March 2003
- President: Jiang Zemin
- Vice Premier: Li Lanqing; Qian Qichen; Wu Bangguo; Wen Jiabao
- Preceded by: Li Peng
- Succeeded by: Wen Jiabao

Vice Premier of China
- In office 8 April 1991 – 17 March 1998
- Premier: Li Peng

Governor of the People's Bank of China
- In office 2 July 1993 – 30 June 1995
- Premier: Li Peng
- Preceded by: Li Guixian
- Succeeded by: Dai Xianglong

Party Secretary of Shanghai
- In office 1 August 1989 – 20 March 1991
- Preceded by: Jiang Zemin
- Succeeded by: Wu Bangguo

Mayor of Shanghai
- In office 25 April 1988 – 20 March 1991
- Preceded by: Jiang Zemin
- Succeeded by: Huang Ju

Personal details
- Born: 23 October 1928 Changsha, Hunan, Republic of China
- Died: 12 August 2026 (aged 97) Beijing, China
- Party: Chinese Communist Party (1949–1958; 1978–2026)
- Spouse: Lao An (m. 1956)
- Children: Zhu Yanlai (daughter); Zhu Yunlai (son)
- Education: Tsinghua University (BS)
- Profession: Electrical engineer
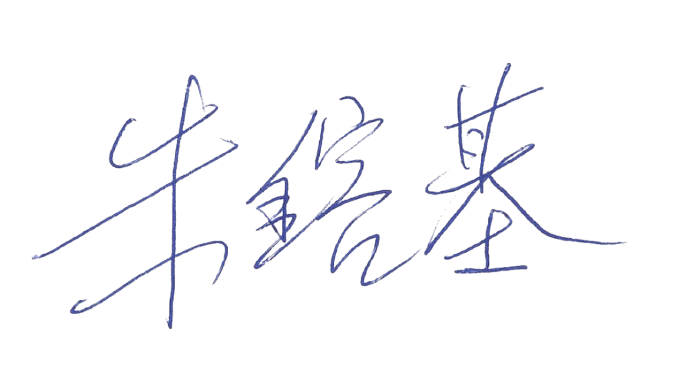
- Signature

Chinese name
- Simplified Chinese: 朱镕基
- Traditional Chinese: 朱鎔基
Transcriptions
Standard Mandarin
- Hanyu Pinyin: Zhū Róngjī
- Wade–Giles: Chu^{1} Jung^{2}-chi^{1}
- IPA: [ʈʂú ɻʊ̌ŋ.tɕí]
Yue: Cantonese
- Jyutping: Zyu1 Jung4gei1
Southern Min
- Hokkien POJ: Chu Iûⁿ-ki
- Zhu Rongji's voice Zhu speaking at the White House; Recorded 8 April 1999

Zhu Rongji (Chinese: 朱镕基; IPA: [ʈʂú ɻʊ̌ŋ.tɕí]; 23 October 1928 – 12 August 2026) was a Chinese politician who served as the premier of China from 1998 to 2003 under CCP general secretary Jiang Zemin. He was a member of the Politburo Standing Committee of the Chinese Communist Party (CCP) from 1992 to 2002.

Born in Changsha, Hunan, Zhu joined the CCP in 1949 and graduated from Tsinghua University in electrical engineering before joining the State Planning Commission. During the 1957 Hundred Flowers Campaign, he criticized official economic planning; he was consequently purged in the Anti-Rightist Campaign, expelled from the party, and demoted to teach maths and science at a cadre school. During the Cultural Revolution, he was an English teacher at a May Seventh Cadre School in Xiangyang from 1970 to 1975. Rehabilitated under Deng Xiaoping in 1978, Zhu rose through the State Economic Commission before serving as mayor of Shanghai (1988–1991) and Shanghai CCP secretary (1989–1991), where he earned a reputation as a pragmatic economic reformer.

Zhu served as a vice premier from 1991 to 1998, becoming first-ranked vice premier in 1993, concurrently as governor of the People’s Bank of China from 1993 to 1995. He played a leading role in the 1994 tax-sharing reform and measures to stabilize the overheated economy. As premier, Zhu oversaw China’s response to the Asian financial crisis, the restructuring of state-owned enterprises, and China’s accession to the World Trade Organization in 2001.

An architect of China’s 1990s economic transition, Zhu was regarded as a capable technocrat, although his policies were criticized for contributing to mass worker layoffs and local land finance. He retired from public life in 2003 and died in Beijing in 2026 at the age of 97.

== Early life and career ==
=== Family ===
Zhu Rongji's ancestral home was Fengyang County, Anhui, and his family had lived for generations at Tangpo in Ansha Township, Changsha County, Hunan, where they were a locally prominent clan. The Zhu family strictly adhered to the clan naming conventions laid down by the Ming founder Zhu Yuanzhang (the Hongwu Emperor) in the Huang-Ming Zuxun (lit. "Ancestral Injunctions of the August Ming"). For the lineage of his eighteenth son, Zhu Pian (朱楩), Prince of Min, the Ming founder personally bestowed a twenty-character generational name poem to serve as ancestral-temple designations, reading: "徽音膺彥譽, 定幹企禋雍, 崇理原諮訪, 寬鎔喜賁從" (Hui-Yin-Ying-Yan-Yu, Ding-Gan-Qi-Yin-Yong, Chong-Li-Yuan-Zi-Fang, Kuan-Rong-Xi-Bi-Cong). Under this clan-law provision, successive generations of the Prince of Min's descendants were required to take, in order, the characters of the poem as their generational markers.

According to the generational ranking in the Zhu genealogy, Zhu Rongji's grandfather was named Zhu Fangxu (朱訪緒, of the "Fang" generation), his father was named Zhu Kuanshu (朱寬澍, of the "Kuan" generation), and Zhu Rongji's own given name bears the character "Rong" (鎔). Zhu Rongji was born in Changsha County, Hunan, on 23 October 1928 to a family of intellectuals. His father died before he was born, and his mother died when he was nine. Zhu was subsequently raised by his uncle, Zhu Xuefang, who continued to support Zhu's education.

=== Education ===
Zhu was educated locally, and after graduating from high school he enrolled at the prestigious Tsinghua University in Beijing in 1947. At Tsinghua he became a student leader and took part in activities organized by the CCP. He joined the CCP in 1949, the same year that Mao Zedong proclaimed the PRC, and he graduated from Tsinghua University with a bachelor's degree in electrical engineering in 1951.

=== People's Republic of China ===
Zhu then began his career as a civil servant in the Northeast China Ministry of Industries, where he was appointed the deputy head of its production planning office. In 1951, he became the chairman of the Tsinghua Student Union. From 1952 to 1958 he worked in the State Planning Commission, where he was group head, deputy director, and deputy section chief. In 1957, during the Hundred Flowers Campaign, he criticized Mao's economic policies, saying that they promoted "irrationally high growth". His comments led to him being subsequently identified as a "rightist" in 1958 during the Anti-Rightist Campaign, for which he was persecuted, demoted, disgraced, and thrown out of the Communist Party in January 1958. In the late 1950s, his family was also persecuted for their pre-revolutionary status as wealthy landowners, and their family mansion was destroyed.

After his persecution as a rightist, Zhu was sent to work at a remote cadre school. In 1962, following the famine and industrial collapse caused by the Great Leap Forward, Zhu was pardoned (but not politically rehabilitated), and assigned to work as an engineer at the National Economic Bureau of the State Planning Commission. During the Cultural Revolution, Zhu was purged again. From 1970 to 1975, he was sent for "re-education" to a May Seventh Cadre School, a special farm for disgraced government workers and former Party members. During his five-year exile in the countryside Zhu was a manual laborer, raising pigs and cattle, carrying human waste, and planting rice.

Shortly after Mao's death in 1976, Deng Xiaoping rose to power and subsequently initiated political reforms leading to the rehabilitation of victims of the Cultural Revolution. From 1976 to 1979, Zhu worked as an engineer in the Ministry of Petroleum Industry, and served as the director of the Chinese Academy of Social Sciences' Industrial Economic Bureau. In 1978, he was formally rehabilitated and allowed to rejoin the CCP. During the late 1970s, Zhu's positions were relatively low-profile, but after Deng consolidated his power in the 1980s and the government became more meritocratic, Zhu was promoted to work in increasingly demanding positions. He had few connections in the army, the Party, or the bureaucracy and was able to rise through the ranks of the government mostly through his own skills. In 1979, he was reassigned to the State Economic Commission, the successor of the State Planning Commission, where he served as vice minister from 1983 to 1987.

After being politically rehabilitated and re-entering the civil service, Zhu resumed connections with his alma mater, Tsinghua University. In 1984, he was named the founding dean of the Tsinghua University School of Economics and Management. He held his position as dean at Tsinghua for 17 years, throughout most of his subsequent public career. As he became increasingly able to meet and make connections with foreign academics and world leaders, he was able to promote a close academic relationship between Tsinghua and M.I.T. Later in his career, he gained a reputation as a mentor to subordinates, a habit that observers interpreted as a product of his position as an educator at Tsinghua.

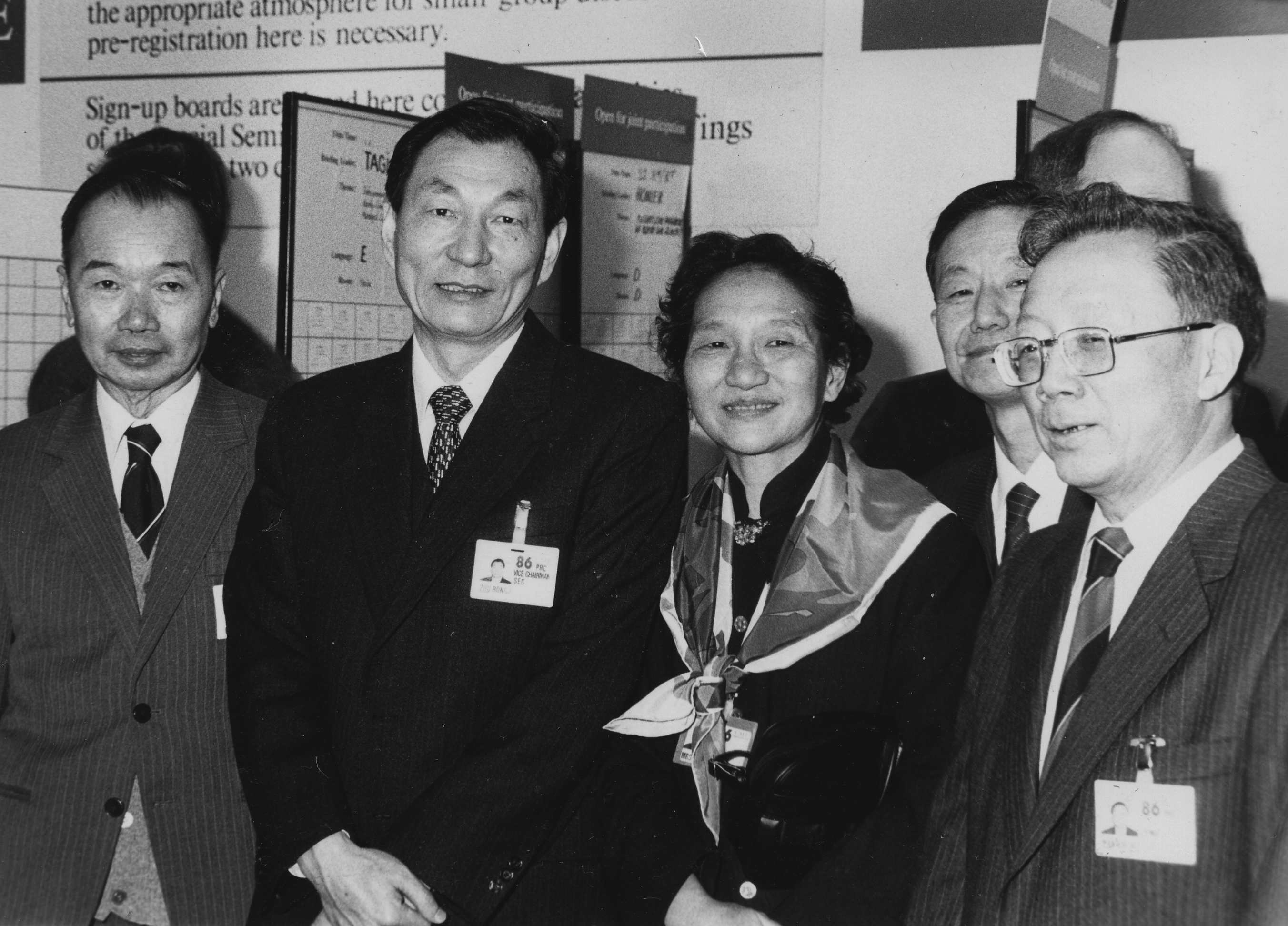
Zhu (second left) leading the Chinese delegation at the European Management Forum in 1986

== Political career in Shanghai ==
In 1988, after mayor Jiang Zemin became Party Secretary of Shanghai, Zhu was promoted to work as the mayor of Shanghai, which was then China's largest, most industrially developed, and wealthiest city. During Zhu's term as mayor of Shanghai, he oversaw large, rapid improvements in telecommunications, urban construction, and transportation, especially in Pudong, a large and high-profile special economic zone.

Early in Zhu's mayoralty, he delivered the speech, "Let Enterprises Swim by Themselves in the Markets" in which he encouraged enterprises and people to "go through the markets", stating that "everyone can form links through the markets". The speech helped establish his reputation as a proponent of economic liberalization.

It was during his time as mayor of Shanghai that he developed a public reputation as a strong opponent of corruption, and a talented economic reformer. His efforts to simplify the process by which the government approved business deals earned him the nickname "One-Chop Zhu". To improve relations with the foreign business community and solicit outside advice, he formed an advisory committee composed of foreign businessmen. While working in Shanghai, he began his long working relationship with subsequent CCP general secretary Jiang (then party secretary of Shanghai) that continued throughout Zhu's career.

He also became known while administering Shanghai for his strict adherence to law and party discipline, and for his refusal to grant extrajudicial favours to those close to him. Once in 1988, when some family members asked him over dinner if he could bend the PRC's residency (hukou) laws to allow them to move to Shanghai, he turned them down, responding: "What I can do, I can done already. What I cannot do, I will never do."

In 1989, when large-scale protests broke out in numerous cities around the PRC, there were also large, well-organized protests in Shanghai. Unlike the government's violent crackdown of protesters in Beijing, Zhu was able to peacefully resolve the local situation. At one point a group of protesters derailed and burnt a train, for which several participants were arrested and executed, but there was otherwise little loss of life, and Zhu was able to retain significant public sympathy throughout the event. In a September 1989 meeting with David M. Lampton, Zhu attributed his success resolving the protests in Shanghai to the government's approach in Beijing, stating, "All the demonstrations and riots were directed by people in Beijing, so until Beijing solved the problem Shanghai could not. The solution in Beijing made it possible to solve the Shanghai situation peacefully."

Following the violent resolution of the Tiananmen protests there was a brief struggle for control of the PRC government within the Communist Party. Zhu was promoted to work as the Party Secretary of Shanghai in 1989. Zhu assisted Deng in regaining his prestige and authority by assisting Deng in organizing his 1992 Southern Tour.

In 1990, Zhu led a delegation of PRC mayors to meet with local and national political and business leaders from the United States, attempting to maintain and improve political and business relationships. It was the first high-profile group from the PRC to visit the United States since the suppression of the 1989 protests. Some of the officials Zhu met on the visit included Richard Nixon, Henry Kissinger, Bob Dole, and Nancy Pelosi. During the visit Zhu gave unscripted speeches in Chinese and English, and was praised by U.S. journalists, politicians, and business leaders for his frankness, openness, energy, and technical background.

Although he demonstrated a desire and ability to enact large, thorough legal and economic reforms, and political reforms aimed at making the PRC government more efficient and transparent, Zhu made it clear that he did not support dramatic political change. At a press conference during his 1990 trip to the U.S., Zhu stated, "You have your system of democracy, and we have our system of democracy. But that does not mean we have nothing in common." When asked by Western journalists whether he was China's Gorbachev, he responded, "No, I am China's Zhu Rongji".

== Vice Premiership ==
=== Overview ===
In 1991, largely due to his success in managing the development of Shanghai, Zhu was promoted into the central government in Beijing, where he focused on planning and resolving economic projects and issues as the vice premier of the State Council under Premier Li Peng and the director of the State Council Production Office. He also served an overlapping term as the governor of the People's Bank of China from 1993 to 1995. His first issues after arriving in Beijing were to restructure the debts owed by state-owned enterprises, and to simplify and streamline the process by which farmers sold their grain to the government. Zhu was able to enact relatively far-reaching reforms largely via the broad support of Deng Xiaoping, who noted that Zhu "has his own views, dares to make decisions, and knows economics." In comparing Zhu to his peers when considering his appointment, Deng said, "The current leadership do not know economics... Zhu Rongji is the only one who understands economics."

When a global recession occurred in 1992, the PRC was challenged with excessive investment in fixed assets, excessive monetary supply, and chaotic financial markets. Inflation rates reached over 20%. As the director of the central bank and the vice-premier and head of the State Council Economic and Trade Office, Zhu resolved these issues by limiting monetary supply, eliminating duplicate low-tech industrial projects, devaluing the PRC currency, cutting interest rates, reforming the tax system, and investing state capital in the transportation, agricultural, and energy sectors. He attempted to reform the state banking sector by introducing greater oversight to discourage reckless lending, introducing "asset management companies" to manage the many large non-performing loans that many of the PRC's banks had accumulated, and privatizing large banks in order to expose them to free market competition. Following Zhu's management, the PRC economy was able to maintain stable growth and avoid dramatic price fluctuations. Zhu's ability to stabilize the economy led to his being named to the CCP Politburo Standing Committee at the 14th Party Congress in 1992, after which he also retained his other posts.

In July 1993, at the first National Finance Work Conference, Zhu gave a speech in his capacity as governor of the People's Bank of China. Zhu explained his view of how the PRC's financial system should be structured, stating that the state "must establish a system of financial institutions, under the supervision of the central bank, principally consisting of national policy banks and state-owned commercial banks, but that encompasses a variety of financial institutions". His proposed institutions included an export-import bank, a national interbank lending system, a short-term paper market, and an renminbi exchange rate mechanism based on the market rate. As researcher Zongyuan Zoe Liu writes, "The Party's contemporary economic power and financial influence are based substantially upon the institutions that Zhu envisioned in 1993, Fifteen years later, in 2008, the PRC's policy banks and sovereign funds emerged on the global financial scene as some of the world's largest institutional investors, wielding significant influence over financial markets and projecting the Party's power abroad."

The most active opponent of Zhu's plans to reform the PRC economy was Premier Li Peng. Li and Zhu clashed in the first two years following Zhu's appointment as vice-chairman; but, by the time that he suffered a heart attack in 1993, Li had lost influence within the government and was no longer able to block many of Zhu's reforms. That Zhu's reforms had quickly gained wide support within the central government was made clear at Li's confirmation process during the Party's 1992 convention: although Li's appointment was already agreed upon by China's top leadership, Zhu received a relatively large and unusual protest vote by many of the Party delegates. Throughout Zhu's term as both vice-premier and premier, Li was successful in blocking Zhu from introducing regulation or government oversight over the PRC's power companies, and they remained private monopolies essentially run by Li's family throughout Zhu's term of office.

Zhu once used the term "patriotic organizations" in a speech in the mid-1990s to describe the triads, citing their history as secret societies in resisting foreign invaders and playing a key role in Chinese history.

=== Contributions to socialist market economy ===
Zhu was an advocate for markets while also viewing the state's role in setting the strategic direction of markets as indispensable. Generally, he was skeptical of the efficacy of comprehensive state planning of the economy. Zhu frequently argued in favor of indirect economic instruments, for example at the June 1993 Dalian Conference, although he also viewed central government directives as a viable tool.

Zhu and Deng's vision of the PRC's future was not simply one of rapid growth. It included a programme of continuous reforms, which they believed would be necessary to achieve this growth. There were two major goals Zhu believed were necessary to achieve this vision, which Zhu began while serving as the PRC's vice-premier. His first goal was to rationalize and centralize the fiscal and financial system. The second goal was to streamline and strengthen the state sector.

Zhu's first task was to regain central control over the country's burgeoning yet dangerously decentralized tax revenues. Before reforming the PRC's tax system he went in person to each province of the nation to sell a new "tax sharing" idea modeled on the U.S. federal tax system. Under this new policy, revenue from provinces would go first to Beijing, and then portions would be returned to the provinces. Following the introduction of this tax system, the central government's cut of total revenue increased by over 20% in a single year, balancing the central budget and putting Beijing's resources on track to reliably increase over time. In order to manage the PRC's financial affairs he appointed himself governor of the People's Bank of China with jurisdiction over monetary policy and financial regulations, bringing the highly decentralized banking system more closely under Beijing's control.

Zhu's next task was to deal with the PRC's four colossal state-owned banks, which had accumulated billions of dollars in nonperforming loans due to profligate local lending to unprofitable state-owned enterprises (SOEs). He quarantined these bad loans in newly created "asset-management companies", and recapitalized the banks through government bonds in a restructuring strategy. After his promotion to premier in 1998, Zhu saved the biggest SOEs and allowed thousands of other small and medium-sized firms and factories to go under, assuming that new growth in the private sector could alleviate any surge of unemployment. This strategy resulted in millions of workers losing their "iron rice bowl" guarantees of cradle-to-grave employment, health care benefits, and pensions. Zhu challenged managers to base salaries on performance and market competitiveness and made profitability and productivity determining factors in managerial and executive promotions within surviving SOEs.

Zhu abolished Foreign Exchange Certificates in 1994, which the PRC had used as a parallel currency system for foreigners.

All these economic reform efforts by Zhu did not dismantle the state sector, but streamlined it with the goal of accomplishing Deng's new form of marketized socialism. Although many in the West were skeptical when Deng announced that he would pursue "socialism with Chinese characteristics", Zhu's reforms helped increase the PRC's wealth and power while leaving it under the firm grip of the Communist Party.

Zhu also had an important role in reducing inflation, He successfully achieved this goal by reducing the inflation rate from 24.3% in 1994 to −0.8% in 1998.

== Premiership ==
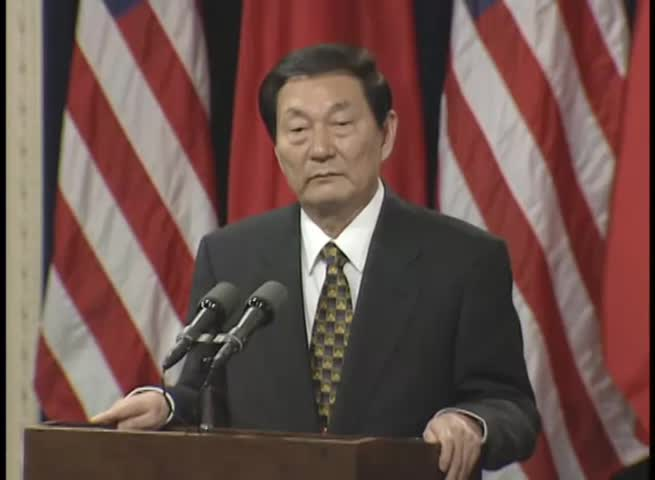
At the press conference during the visit to U.S. (1999)

Zhu was chosen to become the PRC's fifth premier in March 1998, largely due to his success in managing large macroeconomic projects. During his term Zhu continued to focus on issues related to economic development. He generally favoured stable, sustainable development supported by robust macroeconomic control measures and a tight monetary policy. He continued to promote investment in the PRC's industrial and agricultural sectors.

Early in his term he began a programme of privatization that lasted throughout his period in office, during which the PRC's private sector experienced rapid growth. He responded to the 1997 Asian financial crisis by dramatically reducing the size of the state bureaucracy, maintaining strict capital controls, and through funding massive infrastructure projects. During the crisis he refused to devalue the Chinese yuan, and angrily defended his decision when some international leaders suggest that he do so. Following the crisis, Zhu advocated improving international financial markets in order to prevent harmful market speculation.

Zhu's administrative reforms in 1998 reorganized industrial ministries into bureaus under the State Economic and Trade Commission. The economic policy role of the State Development and Planning Commission decreased.

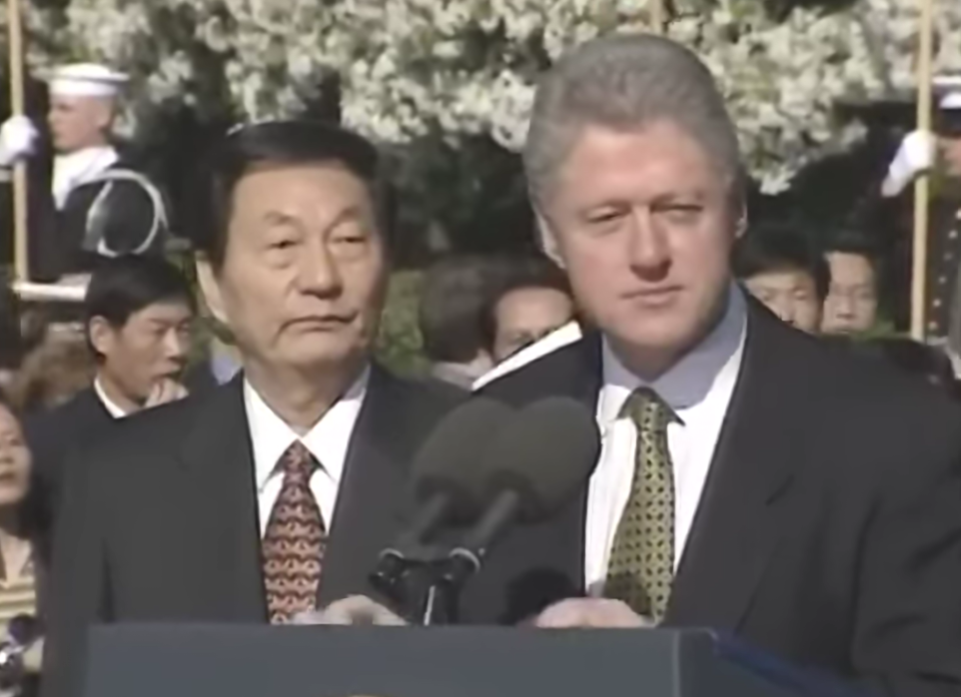
Zhu with President of the United States Bill Clinton during Zhu's visit to U.S. (1999)

In 2003, the State Economic and Trade Commission was restructured into the State-owned Assets Supervision and Administration Commission. He reduced the size of the bureaucracy by half by the end of his term in 2003, though the bureaucracies in districts far from the capital continued to expand, leading to increased tension between some local governments and the farmers whose income supports them.

His reform of state-owned enterprises led to approximately 35% of their workforce, forty million workers, being laid off over five years, a process widely referred to in Chinese as Xiagang (下岗). Zhu introduced limited reforms in PRC's housing system, allowing residents to own their own apartments for the first time at subsidized rates.

By the end of Zhu's term as premier, the Chinese economy was stable and growing confidently. While foreign direct investment (FDI) worldwide halved in 2000, the flow of capital into mainland China rose by 10%. As global firms scrambled to avoid missing the China boom, FDI in China rose by 22.6% in 2002. While global trade stagnated, growing by one percent in 2002, mainland China's trade soared by 18% in the first nine months of 2002, with exports outstripping imports.

=== Anti-corruption initiatives ===
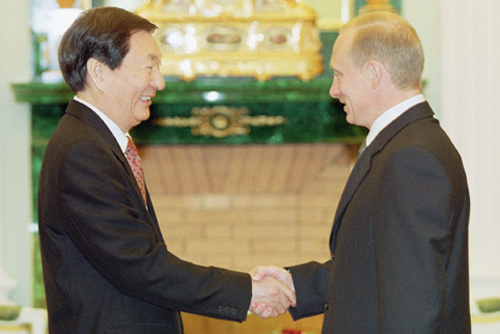
With Vladimir Putin (11 September 2001)

Zhu earned a reputation as a strong, strict administrator, intolerant of corruption, nepotism, or incompetence. In Beijing he was sometimes known by the nicknames "Madman Zhu" and "Boss Zhu" for his hard, transparent work ethic and his tendency to disregard the bureaucratic status quo. In addition to investigating individual examples of potential official corruption, Zhu attempted to make the PRC government more regulated and transparent by increasing the number and powers of independent regulatory commissions, downsizing government bureaucracy, opening government positions to outside experts and reforming the government's system of hiring and promotion based on merit, and improving administrative predictability by strengthening the rule of law.

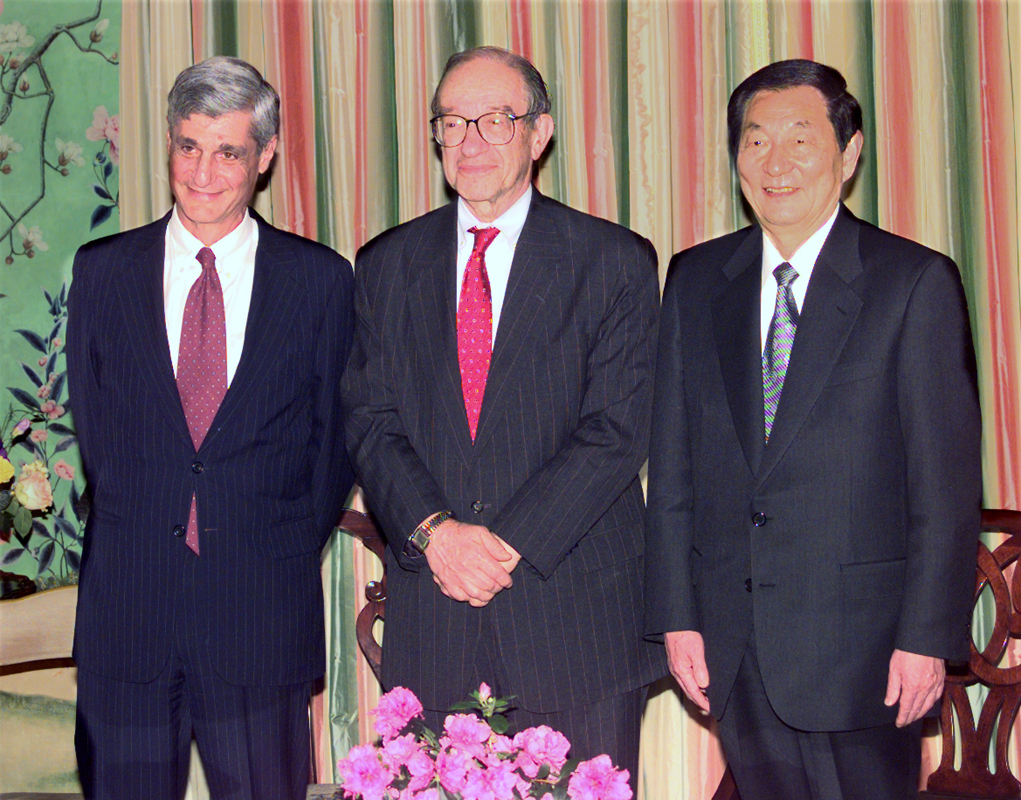
Zhu with Chair of the Federal Reserve Alan Greenspan (center) and U.S. Treasury Secretary Robert Rubin (1999)

Before Zhu came to office, employment in the PRC's bureaucracy was largely obtained via tenure and political connections. Zhu attempted to modernize the bureaucracy's seniority system and improve the government's ability to attract and retain talented workers by opening senior- and mid-level positions to public selection, and by reforming the civil service's examination system. He made a strong effort to attract and promote economists and technocrats from academia and the private sector to work under him as advisors in the central government, and was successful in attracting a small core of several dozen such officials to work under and advise him. By opening mid-level appointments to outside experts, he was able to ensure that the Chinese bureaucrats who were promoted during his term as premier were generally supportive of his ideas.

During his term as premier Zhu engaged in frequent large-scale efforts to fight official corruption. At one time he was reported to have read 16,000 letters a year, sent to him by aggrieved citizens, in order to get a better understanding of the circumstances of ordinary Chinese people. He made frequent official visits outside Beijing to inspect working conditions, especially in the south. Shortly after coming to office, in 1998, he required the People's Liberation Army to relinquish its involvement in business interests that had been making high-ranking officers and their children rich, and later barred civil servants from taking part in business enterprises. He attempted to introduce stricter, more formal oversight to keep provincial leaders from receiving kickbacks from businessmen and embezzling state funds.

Zhu's investigations into official corruption led to his discovery of numerous large-scale misdeeds by provincial officials. After discovering that 25.8 billion RMB allocated for the purchase of grain over six years had gone missing, he launched an investigation which concluded that at least 10 billion RMB had been instead used to construct hotels and luxury apartments, and on speculative business investments. In one inspection tour in 2001, Zhu uncovered the largest corruption ring in modern Chinese history, discovering that many of the highest-ranking officials in Fujian had conspired to operate a massive smuggling ring. In the resulting purge, numerous top-level Party leaders and governors were arrested and executed. On one inspection tour, after noticing that dikes had broken because funds allocated to their proper construction had been stolen by corrupt officials, he flew into a rage over such "son-of-a-bitch construction projects", which were not uncommon in the PRC at the time. Referring to his efforts to fight corruption, he once said, "I will prepare 100 coffins for the corrupt, and one for me, for I will die of fatigue". Much of his efforts to increase the role of the private market in the economy, to improve legal protection for businesses, and to introduce a true commercial banking system were implicitly undertaken in the interest of reducing the kind of official corruption and waste that he uncovered through his personal investigations of government officials.

Zhu, along with his successor Wen, attempted to set limits on the power of local officials to levy miscellaneous service charges and fees in order to protect farmers from indiscriminate taxation by corrupt officials.

=== Cross-strait relations ===
In a joint news conference with U.S. president Bill Clinton, Zhu Rongji elucidated the PRC position on three questions relating to Cross-Strait relations: i) the influence of United States Armed Forces on cross-strait relations; ii) whether there is a timetable for Chinese unification; iii) is he willing to visit Taiwan? Zhu answered that, regarding the People's Republic of China's policy toward Chinese unification, he would not comment further and pointed to previous statements by CCP general secretary Jiang. He claimed that China had upheld the one country, two systems principle and preserved a high degree of autonomy in Hong Kong and compared Taiwan to Hong Kong, noting that China allows Taiwan to retain its own army, and was prepared to let the leader of Taiwan become the deputy leader of China in the event of unification.

Zhu's position on Taiwan changed over the course of his time as premier. During the 2000 ROC presidential election in Taiwan, Zhu warned Taiwanese voters not to vote for the DPP, which favors distancing Taiwan from the PRC, stating, "those who are pro-Taiwan independence will not have a good ending." His attitude towards Taiwan changed after the election. Three years later, in his farewell speech to the National People's Congress in 2003, Zhu encouraged PRC politicians to use softer language in discussing the issue of mainland China–Taiwan relations, saying that mainland China and Taiwan should improve economic, transportation, and cultural ties in order to improve their relationship. During the speech Zhu accidentally referred to PRC and Taiwan as "two countries" before quickly correcting himself and referring to them as "two sides". The incident was reported in Taiwanese media as a "gaffe".

=== Foreign affairs ===
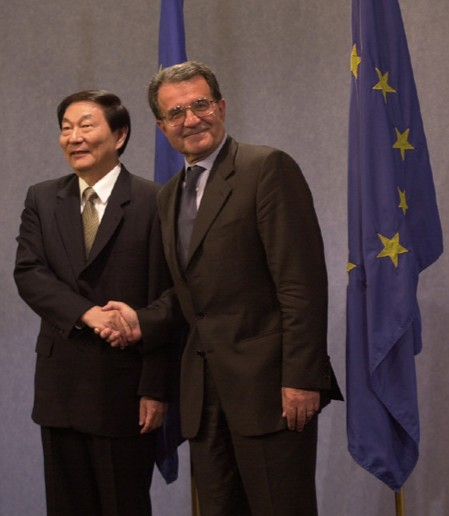
Zhu with President of the European Commission Romano Prodi during the 4th EU – China Summit in Brussels, Belgium (2001)

Zhu started the China Development Forum in 2000. At its inception, the forum was a relatively intimate meeting between PRC leaders and foreign experts. Zhu viewed the meeting as a stress test for leading officials, and encouraged policy debate and discussion with the foreign experts in attendance.

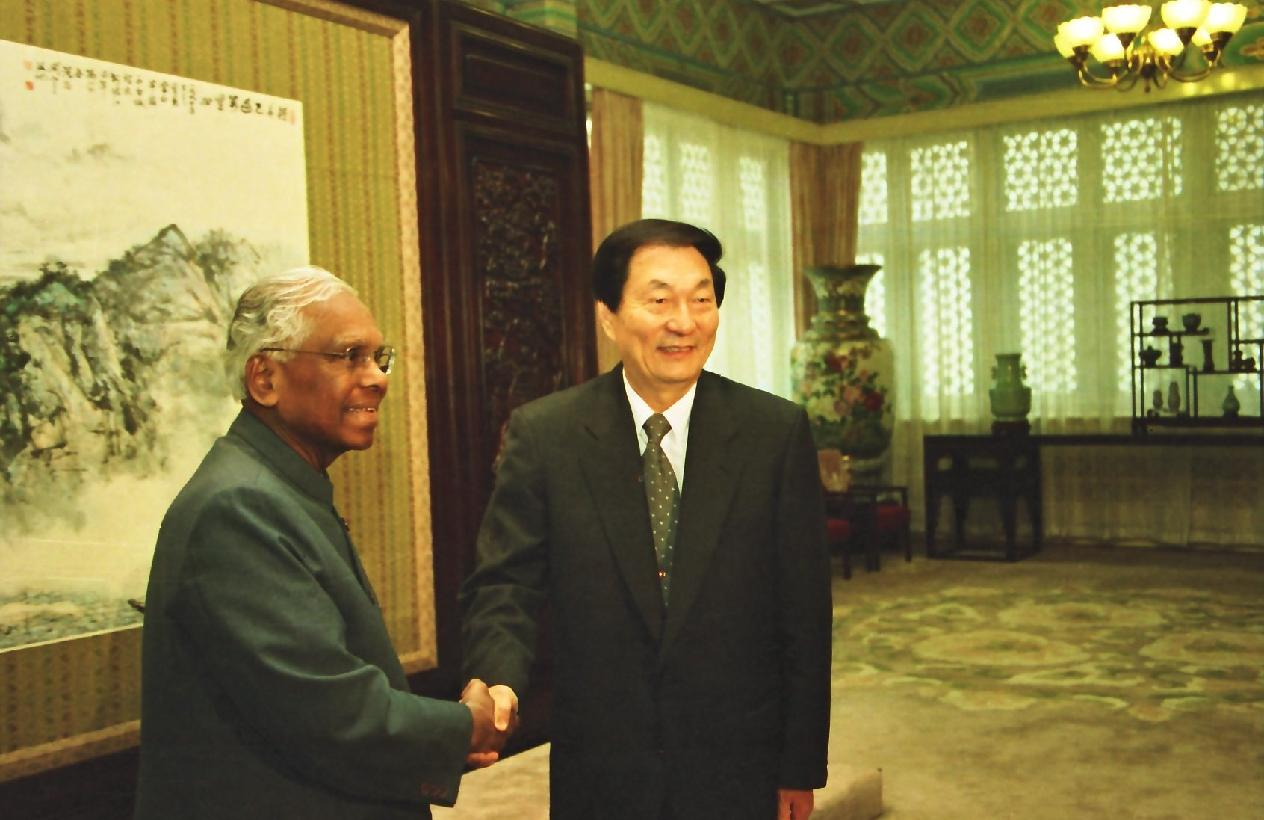
Zhu meeting President of India K. R. Narayanan in Beijing (2000)

He took the lead in negotiating mainland China's entry into the World Trade Organization (WTO), which the country achieved in 2001 to domestic and international acclaim. Joining the WTO opened Mainland China to increased foreign investment, but also required it to conform to international conventions of trade, intellectual property, and environmental management. Zhu expected that Mainland China's entry into the WTO would lead to economic expansion, but also hoped that entering the WTO would force economic and legal changes within the PRC that Zhu himself had little power to implement.

== After retirement ==
Zhu retired from his position as member of CCP Politburo Standing Committee in November 2002 and premier in March 2003 respectively, when he was replaced by Wen Jiabao. Wen was the only Zhu ally to appear on the subsequent nine-person CCP Politburo Standing Committee. After his retirement, Zhu withdrew from any obvious involvement in PRC politics, but he retained ties with Tsinghua University, where he continued to make numerous visits during ceremonies and special events. In 2014, he wrote a rare public letter for the 30th anniversary of Tsinghua School of Economics and Management, but was not able to attend due to poor health. In the letter, he encouraged the students at the prestigious business school to visit poor and rural areas of the PRC, in order to better understand the conditions of most Chinese people. He appeared at the funeral of Huang Ju on 5 June 2007.

After leaving office, Zhu both wrote and became the subject of numerous books. Zhu's first book, Zhu Rongji Meets the Press, a collection of speeches and interviews with foreign and Chinese journalists and officials, was released in 2009 (an English translation of the book was released in 2011). A second book, Zhu Rongji's Answers to Journalists' Questions, a four-volume compilation of Zhu's speeches, articles, and letters, was also released in 2011. The second book was translated and published in English in 2013, under the title, Zhu Rongji on the Record: The Road to Reform. By the end of 2013, over six million copies of his books had been sold. Kissinger wrote that the translation of his books into English represented a significant contribution to Sino-U.S. relations and promoted international understanding of Chinese culture and politics. One Western biography of Zhu encouraged leaders in other developing countries to study and emulate his reforms, and compared his influence on practical economic theory to that of Keynes. Although he had published books compiled from his speeches and interviews, his daughter reported that he had no interest in writing a memoir.

After retiring, Zhu invested much of his time and energy into public philanthropy. In 2013 and 2014 alone, he donated 40 million RMB (c.$6.5 million U.S.) to charity. The donated money reportedly came from the royalties from his books, and was given to a charitable foundation promoting education in poor rural areas. The amount of money given was considered unusual among retired Chinese politicians, leading to speculation about the PRC's political culture. The donations prompted some commenters to compare his character to that of the PRC's first premier, Zhou Enlai.

He did not appear in the 70th anniversary of the PRC on 1 October 2019, 22 days before his 91st birthday. He also did not appear in the 100th anniversary of the CCP on 1 July 2021. He was absent as were the former CCP general secretary Jiang and former CCP Politburo member Luo Gan.

In March 2022, according to a report published by The Wall Street Journal, Zhu voiced his opposition to current CCP General Secretary Xi Jinping seeking an unprecedented third consecutive term, as it would break the established party system of leadership succession.

== Personal life and death ==
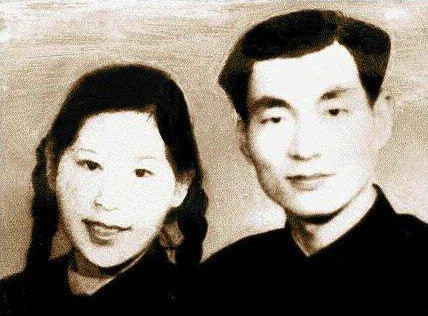
Zhu Rongji and his wife, Lao An (1956)

Zhu is regarded as having been a good public speaker and was notable during his career for his proficient command of English. He often made public speeches without the aid of a script, and when he did so his speeches were said to be entertaining and dramatic.

He enjoyed literature and had reportedly spent much of his retirement reading books he had no time to read while in office. He played the erhu, an instrument similar to a two-stringed violin. He enjoyed the Peking Opera and once appeared on stage as an actor in a performance.

His wife, Lao An, once served as the vice-chairman on the board of directors of China International Engineering and Consulting. She and Zhu attended two schools together, first at the Hunan First Provincial Middle School, then at Tsinghua University. They have two children, a son and a daughter. Their son, Zhu Yunlai, was born in 1957. He was once the president and chief executive officer of one of the PRC's most successful investment banks, China International Capital Corp. Their daughter, Zhu Yanlai, was born in 1956. As of 2026, she is the assistant chief executive for the Bank of China (Hong Kong), and held a seat on the National Committee of the Chinese People's Political Consultative Conference.

On 12 August 2026, Zhu died in Beijing at the age of 97. In state media his obituary described him as an "outstanding member of the Communist Party of China, a long-tested and loyal Communist fighter, an outstanding proletarian revolutionary and statesman, and an exceptional leader of the Party and state".

Zhu's remains were cremated. His funeral was held at Babaoshan Revolutionary Cemetery in Beijing. According to Xinhua, all seven members of the CCP Politburo Standing Committee (including CCP general secretary Xi Jinping and premier Li Qiang) as well as vice president Han Zheng paid their final respects. Former CCP general secretary Hu Jintao also sent a wreath, and flags were flown at half-mast.

== Legacy ==
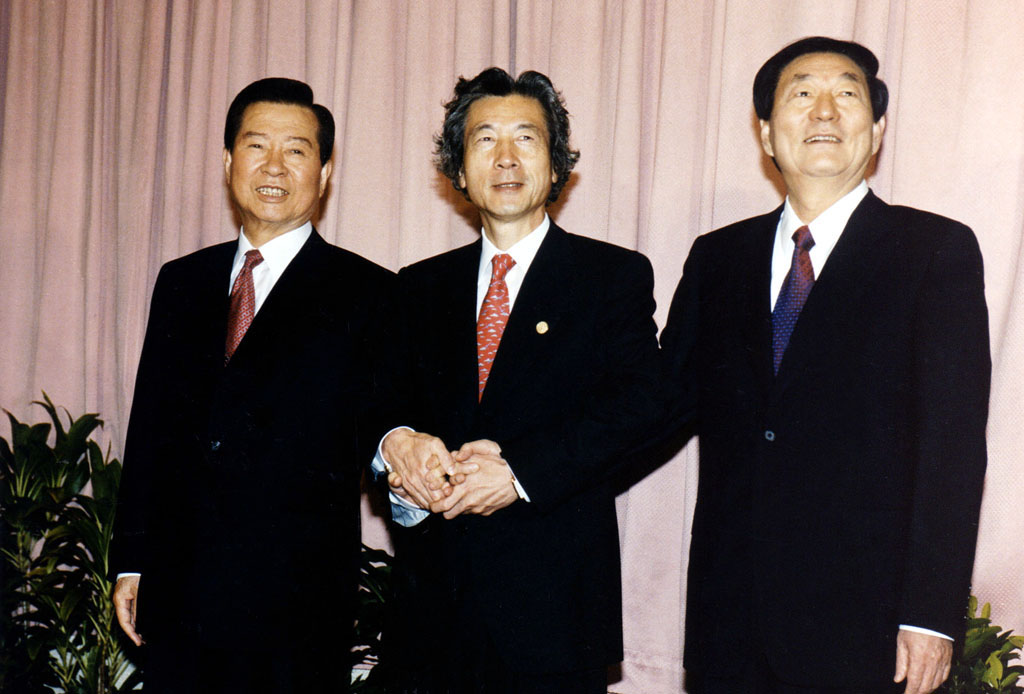
In 2001, Zhu Rongji met with Japanese Prime Minister Junichiro Koizumi and South Korean President Kim Dae-jung.

Zhu's premiership, especially related to free-market reforms, was controversial. Before his retirement, Zhu publicly acknowledged that he had not been able to complete many of his desired reforms before his term ended. In 2003, he gave a 90-minute address to several thousand delegates in the Great Hall of the People, outlining the "outstanding difficulties and problems" which he expected his successor as premier, Wen Jiabao, would have to face. After Zhu retired, Wen attempted to continue many of the reforms that Zhu had conceived and designed, creating and increasing the powers of independent regulatory commissions and restructuring the bureaucracy on the basis of merit. Some of Zhu's reforms were reversed under the leadership of Hu Jintao, and other reforms he hoped would be addressed by the incoming administration were not implemented. Notably, state-owned enterprises were allowed to regrow and keep a critical place in the PRC economy, and large areas of the banking sector remained unregulated. Hu may have reversed the PRC government's previous position and promoted state-owned enterprises in an effort to promote social stability. During Wen's term of office many of the reforms Zhu proposed were opposed by conservative government ministers, notably including the former commerce minister, Bo Xilai. Zhu's position as head of the central bank was given to one of his close associates, Zhou Xiaochuan, and Zhu's views retained some influence in the PRC's financial sector following his retirement.

Among the international leaders he met and negotiated with as premier, he gained a reputation for intelligence, energy, impatience for incompetence, shrewdness, and as a person who must be respected, even among those who disliked him. Journalists noted his proficient command of English and his "disarming" sense of humor. By the time he retired, Zhu had become noticeably more popular than his predecessor, Li Peng, both in the PRC and abroad. Economists noted that during his time in office he had shown himself to be much better at economic management than Li Peng.

Zhu was well known for his efforts to fight official corruption, but was not able to contain official corruption during his term. Following the 18th CCP National Congress in 2012, one of Zhu's proteges, Wang Qishan, became the head of the CCP's Central Commission for Discipline Inspection, the Communist Party's main organ in charge of investigating internal corruption.

== See also ==
- History of the People's Republic of China (1989–2002)
- Macroeconomic regulation and control
- Politics of China

Party political offices
Preceded by Jiang Zemin	Secretary of the CCP Shanghai Committee; 1989–1991	Succeeded by Wu Bangguo
Government offices
Preceded by Jiang Zemin	Mayor of Shanghai; 1988–1991	Succeeded by Huang Ju
Preceded by Li Guixian	Governor of People's Bank of China; 1993–1995	Succeeded by Dai Xianglong
Preceded by Yao Yilin	First-ranking Vice-Premier of the State Council; 1993–1998	Succeeded by Li Lanqing
Preceded by Li Peng	Premier of China; 1998–2003	Succeeded by Wen Jiabao
