= Li Zinai =

Chinese economist

Li Zinai (Chinese: 李子奈; pinyin: Lǐ Zǐnài) is a Chinese economist, who was Professor of Economics at Tsinghua University School. Li is best known for his work on econometrics.

== Personal life ==
Li was born in November 1946 in Funing, Jiangsu. Li received bachelor's degree from Department of Engineering Physics, Tsinghua University in 1970, and master's degree in nuclear engineering in 1981 before working as an econometrics scholar in Tsinghua University School of Economics and Management in 1986.

== Academics works and textbooks ==
Li has written two popular college-level textbooks: Econometrics (计量经济学, now in 4th edition) and Advanced Applied Econometrics (高级应用计量经济学). He had been continuously teaching econometrics and advanced econometrics for more than 20 years.
