= Zhu Lin (politician) =

Wife of Li Peng

- 朱琳
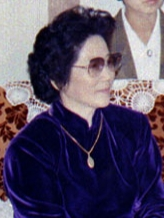
- Zhu in 1992
- Born: November 7, 1933 (age 92); Shanghai, China
- Education: Heilongjiang University
- Occupations: Politician, economist
- Political party: Chinese Communist Party
- Spouse: Li Peng (m. 1958; died 2019)
- Children: 3

Zhu Lin (Chinese: 朱琳; pinyin: Zhū Lín; born November 7, 1933) is a retired Chinese politician and economist, and the widow of former Chinese Premier Li Peng.

== Biography ==
Zhu was born in Shanghai, on November 7, 1933. Her father Zhu Jixun (朱己训) was a businessman. She elementary studied at Chongqing Jianshan Middle School and secondary studied at Bashu Secondary School. After graduating from Heilongjiang University, she was dispatched to the Jilin Chemical Plant as an interpreter. Later she served as head of the Foreign Affairs Office of North China Electric Power Bureau, director of the Beijing Office of Guangdong Daya Bay Nuclear Power Plant, and director of the Research Office of the Special Administrative Region Office of the State Council. She also served as vice president of the China National Committee on Care for Children and the China Women Development Foundation.

== Personal life ==
Zhu was married to Li Peng on July 10, 1958. They have two sons and a daughter, namely Li Xiaopeng, Li Xiaolin, and Li Xiaoyong.

Honorary titles
Preceded by Liang Boqi	Spouse of the Premier of the People's Republic of China; 1987–1998	Succeeded by Lao An
