= Urban housing system reform =

1998 housing reforms in China

The urban housing system reform was an urban housing system reform that was implemented by China in 1998. The reform direction was determined to be the marketization, monetization and commodification of urban housing. In particular, in conjunction with the tax-sharing system reform in 1994, the land finance of local governments in China has become the main driving force for the rapid development of housing commodification in China.

== History ==
=== Preliminary test ===
As early as 1979, the government began to conduct housing sales experiments in Xi'an and Nanning. The central government invested 1 million yuan and related building materials in Xi'an to build housing for the local urban population. The local housing department conducted a housing sales experiment on 37 units in a seven-story building. The average floor price was set at 150 yuan based on cost. For a medium-sized apartment with an area of about 60 square meters, the total price was about 9,000 yuan. By May 1980, only 18 of the 37 apartments had been sold. Three families bought 6 apartments with the help of relatives abroad. 5 apartments were sold to retired officials. The owners of 3 apartments had just been exonerated from the Cultural Revolution and had their income restored. The remaining apartments belonged to teachers, doctors, civil servants, and workers. Among them, 8 owners bought the apartments in full, and the rest were paid for with mortgages within five years.

In 1980, Deng Xiaoping said when talking about housing issues that urban residents could purchase houses. In June 1980, the CCP Central Committee and the State Council of China proposed in the "Outline of the Report on the National Basic Construction Work Conference" to implement the housing commercialization policy, allowing private individuals to build, buy, and own their own houses.

The central government further promoted the housing sales experiment nationwide. In 1980, it planned to launch 135,000 square meters of housing for sale. By 1981, the housing sales policy had been implemented in more than 60 cities and some counties and towns in 23 provinces and autonomous regions across the country. However, many places reported that the local willingness to buy houses was not high. At that time, most families in Xi'an could only afford a down payment of 3,000-5,000 yuan. The government also required that the remaining amount be paid off within 5 years. At the same time, the rental price was very cheap. The housing sales experiment was finally stopped in 1982.

=== Home purchase subsidies ===
In 1982, the government designed a "three-thirds system" to subsidize housing purchases. The so-called "three-thirds system" means that the homebuyer, the employer, and the government each bear one-third of the housing price. The State Council took the lead in piloting the program in Siping, Shashi, Zhengzhou, and Changzhou. Residents could not only buy newly built housing, but also public housing where they lived. The government also reformed the rental subsidy system accordingly. At that time, the average price of newly built housing was between 150 and 200 yuan, which included not only the cost of housing construction, but also the expenditure on surrounding facilities. The average unit size was 56 square meters. By 1984, a total of 2,140 houses had been sold in the pilot cities. In 1985, the pilot program was extended to 160 cities and more than 300 counties across the country, and a total of 200,000 houses were sold. The conclusion drawn from the pilot program was that individuals had the willingness and ability to buy houses in installments, and public housing could be sold to individuals. However, due to the excessive subsidies, many units were unwilling to sell their houses. At the same time, the policy did not change the situation that rents were too low, and that buying a house was not as good as renting, and that buying early was not as good as buying late. Due to the excessive financial burden, the experiment came to an abrupt end in 1985.

=== Rent increase subsidy ===
In 1986, the State Council Housing System Reform Leading Group was established and issued the "Implementation Plan for the Phased and Batch-by-Batch Promotion of Housing System Reform in Urban Areas Nationwide". The group designed a plan of "raising rent, issuing subsidies, and promoting employees to buy houses" and selected four cities, Tangshan, Yantai, Bengbu, and Changzhou, as pilot cities. Among them, Yantai implemented the plan of "raising rent and issuing vouchers, and starting with empty circulation": "raising rent and issuing vouchers" means raising the rent of public housing to the level calculated based on depreciation, maintenance, management, investment interest and property tax. The actual rent for individuals increased from the original 0.07 yuan/square meter to 1.28 yuan/square meter. At the same time, housing subsidy vouchers were issued at 23.5% of the basic salary. "Starting with empty circulation" means that the rent vouchers issued by the work unit in the initial stage have no capital guarantee. After receiving the housing property unit, it needs to be returned to the work unit of the householder. The work unit continues to issue subsidies to employees in this way. Finally, the housing reform in Yantai entered the actual implementation in 1988. Housing subsidies and rent payments were settled in monetary form. The rent reform was also carried out in cities such as Shenyang, Nanping, Yingtan, Shenzhen, Foshan, and Jiangmen. In order to cooperate with the reform, the State Council and the People's Bank of China carried out pilot housing finance reform in Yantai and Bengbu respectively. The two cities successively established housing savings banks to manage employee housing funds and related rent transfers, housing savings, real estate enterprise credit, etc. By 1989, Yantai Housing Savings Bank had established 5 offices, with a total deposit balance of RMB 120 million. It provided RMB 5.62 million in housing loans to 693 urban residents in the city, issued RMB 34 million in loans to real estate enterprises, and cooperated with real estate enterprises to invest in the construction of more than 5,000 new houses, becoming the city's housing rent settlement center. In addition, housing cooperatives for individual fundraising to build houses appeared in large cities such as Wuhan and Shenyang and medium-sized cities such as Wenzhou.

On 15 January 1988, the State Council convened the first National Housing System Reform Conference. Chen Junsheng, Secretary-General of the State Council, announced that starting that year, the housing system reform would be carried out in stages and batches in China. In 1990, the State Council promulgated the "Provisional Regulations on the Grant and Transfer of the Right to Use State-Owned Land in Urban Areas of the People's Republic of China".

Although rent reforms have been effective in Yantai, Bengbu, Tangshan, Shenzhen, Chengdu and other places, with the outbreak of inflation and the 1989 Tiananmen Square protests in China at the end of the 1980s, the government considered that continuing to raise rents would exacerbate inflation, and that the rent increase plan was resisted by policy implementers because it touched the interests of some people in power. Therefore, the rent increase policy, which was originally planned to be fully promoted in 3–5 years, was aborted.

In June 1991, the State Council issued the "Notice on Continuing to Actively and Steadily Carry Out Housing System Reform", emphasizing new policies for new housing and avoiding the impact of rent increases on existing housing on rent increases and sales of new housing. On October 17 of the same year, the State Council approved the "Opinions on Comprehensively Promoting Urban Housing System Reform" drafted by the State Council Housing System Reform Leading Group, proposing to gradually transform the current in-kind welfare distribution system of public housing into a monetary wage distribution system, and setting phased targets for rent increases. Local governments also successively announced and implemented housing reforms. The operation of some large cities was relatively standardized, while that of some small and medium-sized cities was relatively poor. Some cities had excessively large discounts, leading to the phenomenon of low-priced housing purchases. In June 1992, the State Council Housing Reform Work Conference once again proposed to stop the sale of housing at low prices.

=== Fully implement ===
On July 18, 1994, the State Council issued the "Decision on Deepening the Reform of the Urban Housing System", which proposed to change the system in which housing construction investment was contracted by the state and units to a system in which the state, units and individuals share the burden reasonably; to change the system in which units construct, allocate, maintain and manage housing to a system of socialized and professional operation; to change the way housing welfare distribution is distributed to the way individuals purchase it with their own funds; to establish affordable housing to guarantee the housing needs of low- and middle-income families and commercial housing for high-income groups; to establish a housing provident fund; to establish a housing credit system; and to promote the development of the real estate industry and related industries. This plan is also known as the 94 Plan. From 1994 to 1997, the commercialization and marketization of housing were fully promoted, but as a transition in the transition, the welfare system was still retained, and objectively, the new and old housing systems operated on two tracks at the same time. In 1997, the Asian financial crisis broke out, and the Chinese economy faced pressure. In order to cope with the impact of the Asian financial crisis, expand domestic demand and stimulate residents’ housing demand, on July 3, 1998, the State Council issued the “Notice on Further Deepening the Reform of Urban Housing System and Accelerating Housing Construction” (98 Plan), which clarified the direction of marketization, monetization and commercialization of urban housing reform, and launched a thorough housing system reform, stopped “in-kind housing allocation” and implemented housing allocation monetization, marking the establishment of a housing supply system based on market supply.

On July 3, 1998, the State Council issued the "Notice on Further Deepening the Reform of the Urban Housing System and Accelerating Housing Construction", which required that the distribution of housing in kind be stopped from the second half of 1998 and that individual purchase of housing be gradually implemented; that a multi-level urban housing supply system with affordable housing as the main component be established and improved; that housing finance be developed and that the housing transaction market be cultivated and standardized; and that newly built housing be sold only and not rented in principle.

== Reform results ==
After the implementation of the urban housing system reform in 1998, housing in China began to enter the era of commercial housing, and the housing industry became a new economic growth point and pillar industry in mainland China. Since 1998, real estate development and investment in mainland China have continued to grow rapidly, with an increase in growth rate higher than that of fixed asset investment in the same period. The growth rate reached 27.3% in 2001, reaching the first peak, and the growth rate climbed to 30.3% in 2003. In addition, the housing system reform in 1998 also changed the housing concept of urban residents in China, from the concept of welfare housing to the concept of commercial housing, which fully mobilized the enthusiasm of Chinese residents for housing investment and consumption.

After the reform of China's urban housing system in 1998, new housing problems emerged. Among them, the housing problems in large cities are particularly prominent, specifically manifested as: local governments’ reliance on land finance, the continuous and rapid rise in housing prices, the imbalance in the urban housing supply structure, the intensified trend of residential space differentiation, and the low efficiency of housing land resource utilization.
