= Zhu Yunlai =

Chinese businessman (born 1958)

- 朱云来
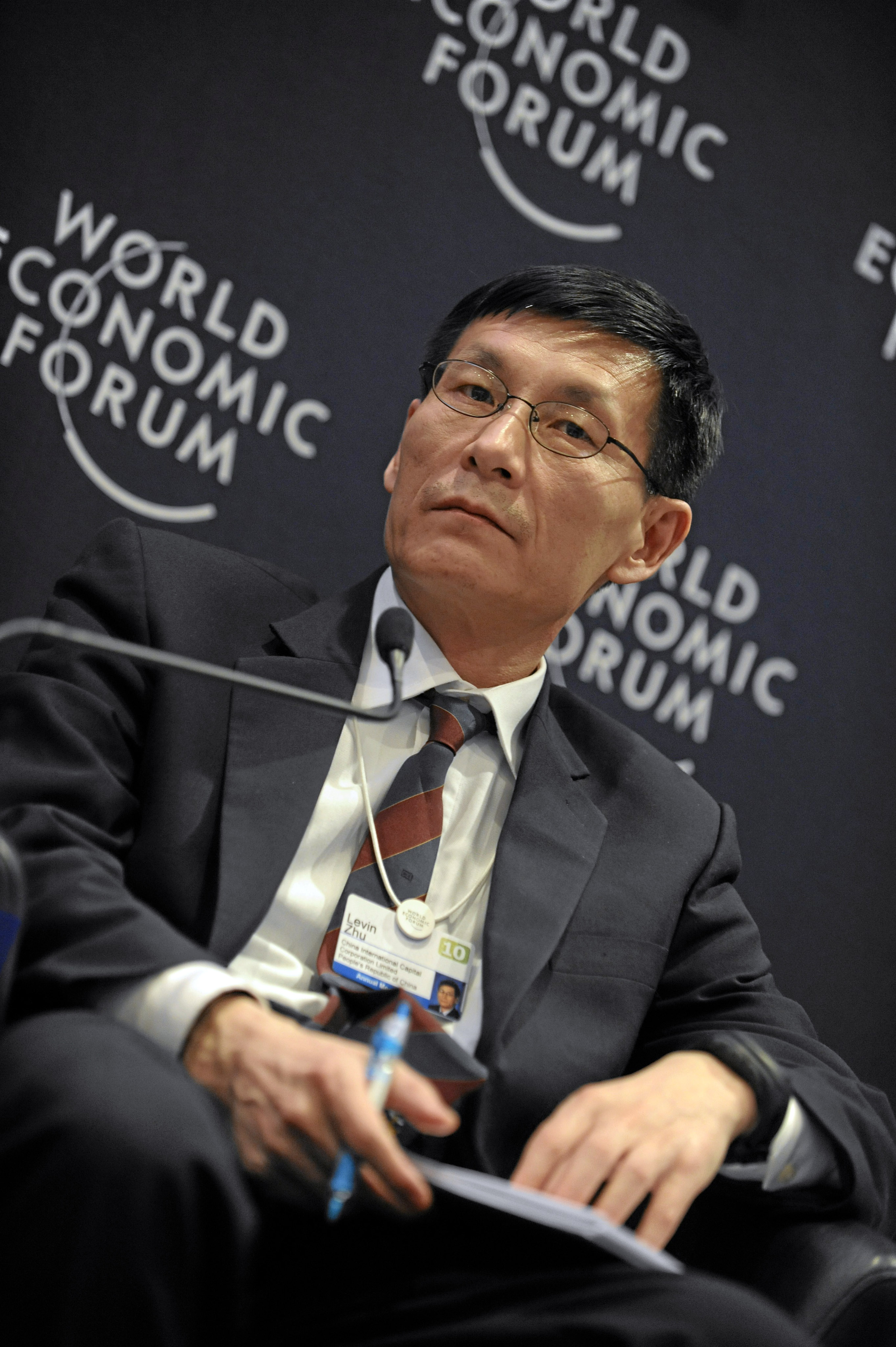
- Zhu in 2010
- Born: 29 July 1958 (age 68); Changsha, Hunan, China
- Education: Nanjing University of Information Science and Technology; University of Wisconsin; DePaul University
- Parents: Zhu Rongji; Lao An

Zhu Yunlai
- Simplified Chinese: 朱云来
- Traditional Chinese: 朱雲來
Transcriptions
Standard Mandarin
- Hanyu Pinyin: Zhū Yúnlái

Levin Zhu Yunlai (born 29 July 1958) is a Chinese businessman.

He is the son of Zhu Rongji, the former Premier of the State Council of the People's Republic of China.

In 1994, he graduated from the University of Wisconsin, studying atmospheric science. From 1994 to 1995, Zhu attended DePaul University in Chicago, where he earned a master’s degree in accounting in eight months.

In 1998, Zhu was invited by Wang Qishan to join China International Capital Corporation, which was then fledgling investment bank based in China, with Morgan Stanley as a shareholder. Zhu was CEO of the firm between 2004 and 2014.

Zhu and his father, Zhu Rongji, by family tradition, are descendants of Zhu Yuanzhang, the Hongwu Emperor, the founding emperor of the Ming dynasty, through the line of Zhu Pian (朱楩), Zhu Yuanzhang's 18th son.
