= Lao An =

Chinese business executive (born 1929)

- 劳安
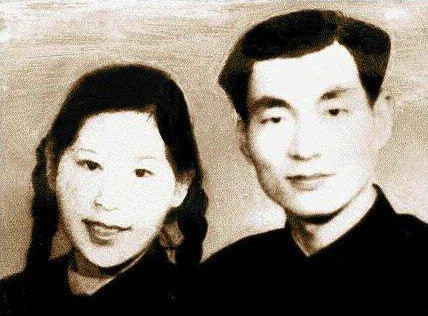
- Lao An and Zhu Rongji in 1956 in Changsha
- Born: August 16, 1929 (age 97); Changsha, Hunan, Republic of China
- Education: Tsinghua University
- Occupation: Business executive
- Agent: China International Engineering Consulting Corporation
- Spouse: Zhu Rongji (m. 1956; died 2026)
- Children: 2

Chinese name
- Simplified Chinese: 劳安
- Traditional Chinese: 勞安
Transcriptions
Standard Mandarin
- Hanyu Pinyin: Láo Ān

Lao An (Chinese: 劳安; born August 16, 1929) is a retired Chinese business executive who once served as vice chairwoman of the China International Engineering Consulting Corporation. She is the widow of former Chinese Premier Zhu Rongji.

== Biography ==
Lao was born in Changsha, Hunan, on August 16, 1929, to Lao Shaoji (劳绍矶), president of Changsha Branch of Fuxing Bank, and Hu Womei (胡沃梅). Her uncle Hu Yanling (胡延龄) was an entrepreneur. She has a brother named Lao Tefu (劳特夫). During the Second Sino-Japanese War, she studied at Dongkou National No.8 Middle School, where she met her future husband Zhu Rongji. Lao graduated from Tsinghua University.

== Personal life ==
Lao was married to Zhu Rongji in 1956 in Changsha, Hunan. They have a son, Zhu Yunlai, and a daughter, Zhu Yanlai (朱燕来).

Honorary titles
Preceded by Zhu Lin	Spouse of the Premier of the People's Republic of China; 1998–2003	Succeeded by Zhang Peili
