= Tsinghua Student Union =

Student Union at Tsinghua University

Tsinghua Student Union, or Tsinghua University Student Union, is the student organization at Tsinghua University dedicated to student governance. It was originally named "Students Autonomy Association" when first founded in 1919.

The Student Union of Tsinghua University in Beijing, China consists of 12 departments with over 300 student volunteers. The 12 departments include Union office, Department of External Affairs, Department of Internal Communications, Department of Student Life, Department of Times Forum, Department of Publicity, Department of Festivals and Events, Department of Academic Studies, Department of Female Students, Department of Cultural Affairs, Department of Student Rights and Benefits, and Department of Sports.

== Union Office ==
As the administrative department of the Student Union, the Union office is responsible for the arrangement and allocation of the Union's human resources, property and information resources. It enables the Union to operate effectively. The office consists of three centers: human resources center, property center and information center.

== Department of External Affairs ==
The Department of External Affairs is the bridge between the Student Union and the external society. It is responsible for seeking corporate sponsorship for various campus events and activities, building and maintaining healthy relationship with other universities and organizations for non-academic collaborations and cultural exchanges, and inviting successful politicians, businessmen and artists for campus events and/or keynote speeches.

== Department of Internal Communications ==
The internal communication department is the link between different departments of the Student Union. It also tries to build a bridge between the branches of the Union for information communicating and resources sharing.

== Department of Festivals and Events ==
The aim of the festival department is to develop the campus culture and enrich students' campus lives. The most important activity of the festival department is the Campus Festival of Song(the Campus singers competition), which is also the classical activity of Tsinghua University. This Festival provides an excellent opportunity for students to show themselves on stage and challenge themselves. Witnessing the development of Tsinghua musical culture, the Festival has been held for 18 times by the festival department.

== Department of Academic Studies ==
The study department tries to build a sound atmosphere for study on campus. It expands the study fields for students, helping enhancing students' interest in studying. Also, it provides the service of fulfilling students' needs in studying. The study department has held a series of classical activities in the university, such as "Qingfengmingbian" debating competition, selection of students' favorite teachers, salon of departments' leaders, scholarship owners interviewing and so on.

== Department of Cultural Affairs ==
The cultural department's duty is to spread the traditional culture and campus culture around students. It mainly specialize in holding all kinds of lectures and presentations, expressing Tsinghua students' personality, and providing students with spiritual enlightenment.

== Department of Student Rights and Benefits ==
This department represents the rights and benefits of Tsinghua students. It helps students to solve problems on campus, and gives advice to the university for further improvement and development.

== Department of Sports ==
Founded in 1950, the sports department of Tsinghua student union has had a 59 years history. The sports department is in charge of providing abundant sports activities and organizing extensive sports competitions. It endeavors to build active sports atmosphere on campus. The major activities of the sports department are "Ma Yuehan" sports games and "sports stars" selection of Tsinghua students.
