= Tsinghua University School of Economics and Management =

Business school of Tsinghua University, China

Coordinates: 39.9995°N 116.3322°E

- 清华大学经济管理学院
- Type: Public business school
- Established: 1984; 42 years ago
- Parent institution: Tsinghua University
- Affiliations: AACSB; EQUIS
- Dean: Bai Chong'en
- Academic staff: 157 (Full-Time Faculty)
- Undergraduates: 1,048
- Postgraduates: 2,150 (440 in Master's ) (278 in Ph.D.) (1,432 in MBA) (979 in Executive MBA)
- Location: Beijing, China
- Campus: Urban
- Website: sem.tsinghua.edu.cn

Chinese name
- Simplified Chinese: 清华大学经济管理学院
- Traditional Chinese: 清華大學經濟管理學院
Transcriptions
Standard Mandarin
- Hanyu Pinyin: Qīnghuá Dàxué Jīngjì Guǎnlǐ Xuéyuàn

The Tsinghua University School of Economics and Management is the business school of Tsinghua University in Haidian, Beijing, China. It offers undergraduate, master, doctoral, and executive education programs.

== Academics ==
=== Rankings ===
In 2021, SEM was ranked 11th globally in the Times Higher Education Rankings by Subjects for "Economics and Business" subjects. It was ranked 23rd in "Accounting and Finance" subjects, 25th in "Economics and Econometrics" subjects and 31st in "Business and Management Studies" subjects by the QS World University Rankings by Subjects.

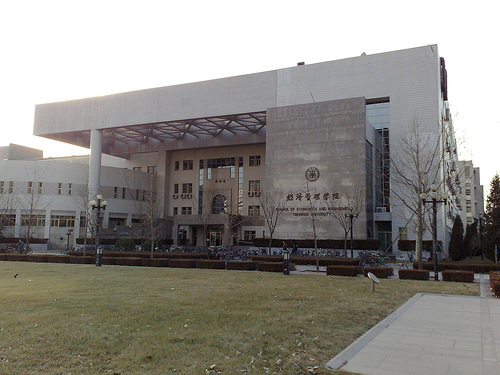
Weilun Building, Tsinghua SEM

=== Advisory board ===
Initiated by SEM's Founding Dean Zhu Rongji, the advisory board of Tsinghua SEM was established in October 2000. Since its establishment, the advisory board has met annually to offer advice on the development of Tsinghua SEM. Zhu served as the honorary chairman of the advisory board from its founding to October 2024, while the current honorary chairman is Wang Qishan.
