= Tax-Sharing Reform of China in 1994 =

Fiscal reform

The Chinese government initiated a fiscal and taxation system reform in 1992, prepared and promulgated in 1993, and finally implemented in 1994. The reform was a large-scale adjustment of the tax distribution system and tax structure between the central and local governments, which was regarded as a milestone in the transition of China's fiscal system from planned economy to market economy. The main purpose of the tax-sharing reform is to alleviate the budget deficit since the end of the 1980s. As the reform achieved indeed remarkable results, it yet evoked problems like heavier financial burden of local governments. In order to make ends meet, governments started to let lands (also known as land finance) which eventually pushed up the land and housing price. Therefore, the tax-sharing reform is considered to be the reason of China's severe land finance.

== History ==
In 1978, since China implemented the reform and opening up policy, China gradually got rid of the planned economic system and experienced a clear process of decentralization in the social and economic fields, including the decentralization of powers over financial administration. Compared with the fiscal system that was previously unified, the local government acquired independent budgeting rights and certain financial autonomy. For instance, local governments could determine their budget expenditures without interference from the central government. Prior to the fiscal reform in 1994, everything was pre-determined and the government revenues was divided into three categories: central income, local income, and shared income, and every year local governments only paid a fixed amount of fiscal tax to the central government. In some places, local governments reduced or exempted corporate taxation in order to keep the money to their own. Some economists believed that this was the cause of inflation in China in the late 1980s. During this period, the central government was found in serious crisis and even borrowed money from local governments. The proportion of fiscal revenue to the gross national product, and that of the central government's fiscal revenue to the overall fiscal revenue both declined rapidly, leading to a lack of funds for the construction of national defence and infrastructure investment. Before the tax-sharing reform in 1993, the central government obtained only 22% of the fiscal revenues while the local governments kept the rest, which made the former unable to make ends meet.

In 1994, the tax-sharing reform was officially implemented, when the central government's fiscal revenue reached an unprecedented growth of 203.5%. However, in 2000, the Ministry of Finance and the State Administration of Taxation disagreed on whether they should keep raising the percentage of government revenue to GDP. While the Minister of Finance Xiang Huaicheng still advocated doing so, Jin Renqing, the director of the State Administration of Taxation, advocated flexible adjustment to the tax system. In 2010, with the steady growth of the central government's fiscal revenue, local governments started to manifest disagreements. By 2015, when the central government's fiscal revenue reached 50% of the total amount, the central government's fiscal expenditure accounted for only 15%, which aggravated the disequilibrium between the central and local governments' financial powers, making it hard for local governments to go through budgeting and implementation process.

== Measures ==
The 1994 tax reform split taxes into three categories: central government taxes (like customs duties), local government taxes (like business taxes) and shared taxes (like VAT). It also created separate central and local tax authorities which were also separate from the Ministry of Finance or local finance departments.

Central government taxes included (1) customs duties/tariffs, VAT and consumption tax on imported goods, (2) a consumption tax analogous to excise taxes, (3) corporate income tax from SOEs controlled by the central government, (4) profits from SOEs controlled by the central government, (5) income taxes from banks and other financial institutions, (6) and taxes imposed on railroad operating units, headquarters of the biggest banks (like the Bank of China, among others).

Local government taxes included: (1) business tax (other than those from railroads and the like which were reserved to the central government), (2) income taxes from local enterprises (but not banks, which were reserved to the central government), (3) profits from local SOEs, individual income tax, urban land tax, and fixed investment direction adjustment tax, (4) urban maintenance and construction tax (excluding those from railroads, banks, and the like which were reserved to the central government), (5) housing tax on houses owned by businesses and rental houses, (6) vehicle and vessel license plate tax, (7) vehicle and vessel usage tax, (8) urban real estate tax, (9) stamp tax, (1) land appreciation tax, (11) slaughtering tax, (12) agriculture tax and animal husbandry tax and state-owned land use tax, (13) cultivated land occupation tax, and (14) deed tax.

Shared taxes included (1) VAT (75% to the central government, 25% to the local government), (2) natural resources tax (with ocean oil resource tax to the central government and the rest to the local governments) and (3) stamp tax from stock transactions.

== Results ==
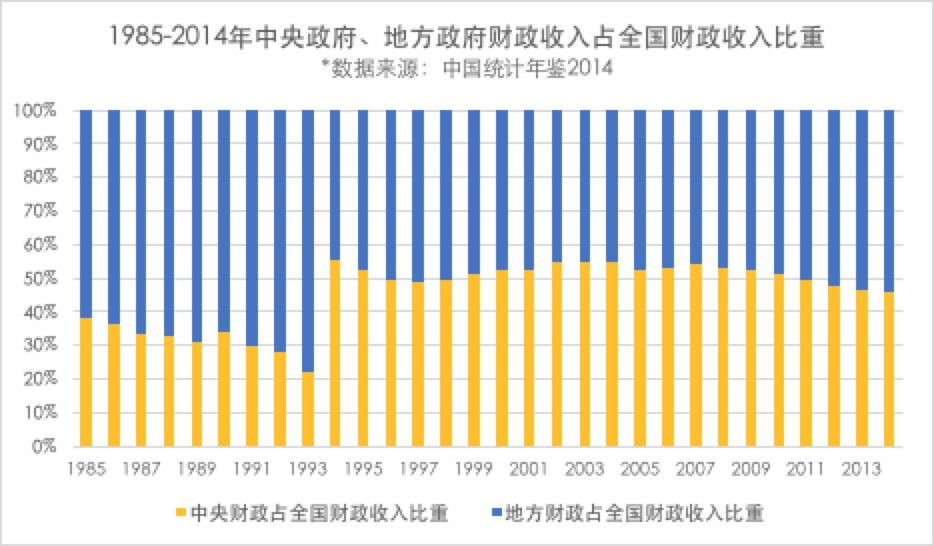
Split between local (blue) and central (yellow) government revenues in China over time

Tax revenue growth increased in the years following the reforms.

VAT, which was levied at all stages of industrial processing and which was shared by the central government and local governments, became the most important source of tax revenue in China. Business tax became the major local tax following the reforms.

The 1994 reform also impacted patterns of urbanization and domestic internal migration. Under the pre-1994 system of fiscal contracting, township and village enterprises (TVEs) had been an important mechanism of industrialization and most peasants who sought a factory job chose to stay in their hometowns and work at TVEs. TVEs began to decline after the 1994 reform and this resulted in major increases in workers migrating to urban areas.

Having resulted in the need of local governments to generate non-tax revenue, which they did in the form of revenues through land development and use fees, the reform also resulted in an increase in both administrative size and geographic size of local governments.
