= Cheonji Nuclear Power Plant =

Planned nuclear facility in Yeongdeok County, South Korea

- Official name: 천지원자력발전소
- Country: South Korea
- Location: Yeongdeok County
- Coordinates: 36.410°N 129.375°E
- Status: Planned
- Owner: Korea Hydro & Nuclear Power
- Operator: Korea Hydro & Nuclear Power

Nuclear power station
- Reactor type: PWR
- Reactor supplier: KEPCO E&C
- Cooling source: Sea of Japan

Power generation
- Units planned: 2 × 1500 MW APR+

The Cheonji Nuclear Power Plant (Korean: 천지원자력발전소) is a planned South Korean nuclear power plant located in rural Yeongdeok County. Cheonji would be the first plant to implement the uprated APR+ design with 1500MWe output. The first unit, Cheonji-1, was scheduled to enter commercial operation in 2026, with the sister unit Cheonji-2 to follow in 2027. However, in the wake of the election of Moon Jae-in, who campaigned on an anti-nuclear platform, plans to acquire the land and proceed with license application were put on hold in 2017. The two units are, as of 2023, scheduled to be completed 2028 and 2029, respectively.

== History ==
In 2014, an agreement was signed to allow construction of two units in Yeongdeok County, with construction planned to start by 2022. The proposed site in Yeongdeok would be named Cheonji and would occupy land in the villages of Nomul-ri, Maejeong-ri, and Seok-ri in Yeongdeok-eup. Samcheok had been previously selected as a new site for reactors in 2012, but residents there rejected a reactor in a 2015 referendum. The population of Yeongdeok had declined from 113,000 in 1974 to 38,000 in 2016, with one-third of residents aged 65 or older; the site for a new nuclear power plant was sought as a way to ensure the continued survival of the county.

Moon Jae-in campaigned in 2017 for president following the impeachment of Park Geun-hye, vowing to not build any new reactors. At the time, five reactors were under construction, three of which were near completion (Shin Kori (SKN)-4; Shin Hanul-1 and -2) and two of which had just started (SKN-5 and -6). Shin Hanul-3 and -4 were in the process of license application, and very preliminary work had started on Cheonji for site acquisition. After Moon was sworn in, construction was suspended on SKN-5/6 and design work was suspended on Shin Hanul-3/4 and Cheonji-1/2 in July 2017. An independent panel was convened to evaluate continuing construction. After hearing from 471 citizens, the panel recommended that construction resume on SKN-5/6 in October 2017 by approximately a three-fifths majority.

== Reactors ==
The planned reactors are APR+ pressurized water reactors.

Name	Capacity (net)	Design	First criticality	Commercial start	NSSS	Turbine generator	A-E	Construction
Cheonji-1	1500 MW	APR+	—	2028 (planned)	Doosan/KEPCO E&C	Doosan/GE	TBD	TBD
Cheonji-2	1500 MW	APR+	—	2029 (planned)	Doosan/KEPCO E&C	Doosan/GE	TBD	TBD

== See also ==
- Nuclear power in South Korea
- List of commercial nuclear reactors in South Korea
