= Nuclear power in South Korea =

Nuclear plants in South Korea (view)
- Active plants
- Plants under construction
- Cancelled plants

Nuclear power is a major power source in South Korea, providing 30% of the country's electricity. The total electrical generation capacity of the nuclear power plants of South Korea is 20.5 GWe from 23 reactors, equivalent to 22% of South Korea's total electrical generation capacity.

In 2012, South Korea had plans for significant expansion of its nuclear power industry, and to increase nuclear's share of generation to 60% by 2035. Eleven more reactors were scheduled to come online in the period 2012 to 2021, adding 13.8 GWe in total.

However, in 2013 the government submitted a reduced draft plan to parliament for nuclear output of up to 29% of generation capacity by 2035, following several scandals related to falsification of safety documentation. This plan still involved increasing 2035 nuclear capacity by 7 GWe, to 43 GWe.

Nuclear energy consumption 2011–2021 (EJ)
2011	2012	2013	2014	2015	2016	2017	2018	2019	2020	2021
1.47	1.42	1.31	1.46	1.53	1.50	1.36	1.22	1.33	1.45	1.43

However, responding to widespread public concerns after the Fukushima Daiichi nuclear disaster in Japan, the high earthquake risk in South Korea, and the nuclear scandals, the new government of President Moon Jae-in elected in 2017 decided to gradually phase out nuclear power. The three reactors currently under construction will be completed, but the government decided these will be the last built, and as the existing plants close at a 40 years end-of-life they will be replaced with other modes of generation. In 2020, it was planned that the number of nuclear reactors would be reduced to 17 by 2034, after a peak of 26 in 2024. However, nuclear policy was again reversed in 2023 by president Yoon Suk Yeol, resuming construction of nuclear reactors and expanding nuclear output to 34.6% share of South Korea electricity generation by 2036.

Nuclear power research in South Korea is very active with projects involving a variety of advanced reactors, including a small modular reactor, a liquid-metal fast/nuclear transmutation reactor, and a high-temperature hydrogen generation design. Fuel production and waste handling technologies have also been developed locally. South Korea is also a member of the ITER nuclear fusion research project.

South Korea is seeking to export its nuclear technology, with a goal of exporting 80 nuclear reactors by 2030. As of 2010, South Korean companies have reached agreements to build a research reactor in Jordan, and four APR-1400 reactors in the United Arab Emirates. In 2025, nuclear power produced 31% of the country’s electricity.

== Reactor overview ==
South Korea has only four active generating station sites, but each site houses four or more units, and three sites have more reactors planned. Thus Korea's nuclear power production is slightly more centralized than most nuclear power nations. Housing multiple units at each site allows more efficient maintenance and lower costs, but reduces grid efficiencies. Four of the six Wolsong reactors are Canadian-designed CANDU pressurized heavy-water reactors (PHWR).

In 2013, in response to a petition from local fishermen, Korea Hydro and Nuclear Power (KHNP) renamed its Yonggwang plant as the Hanbit plant, and its Ulchin (or Uljin) plant in North Gyeongsang province was renamed as the Hanul plant.

In 2014, an agreement was signed to allow construction of two additional APR-1400 reactors at Hanul (as Shin Hanul-3 and -4; construction to start no earlier than 2017) and two units in Yeongdeok County (construction may start by 2022). The proposed site in Yeongdeok would be named Cheonji and would occupy land in the villages of Nomul-ri, Maejeong-ri, and Seok-ri in Yeongdeok-eup. Samcheok had been previously selected as a new site for reactors in 2012, but residents rejected a reactor in a 2015 referendum. The population of Yeongdeok declined from 113,000 in 1974 to 38,000 in 2016, with one-third of residents aged 65 or older; the site for a new nuclear power plant was sought as a way to ensure the continued survival of the county.

Moon Jae-in campaigned in 2017 for president following the impeachment of Park Geun-hye, vowing to not build any new reactors. At the time, five reactors were under construction, three of which were near completion (Shin Kori (SKN)-4; Shin Hanul-1 and -2) and two of which had just started (SKN-5 and -6). After Moon was sworn in, construction was suspended on SKN-5/6 in July 2017 and an independent panel was convened to evaluate continuing construction. After hearing from 471 citizens, the panel recommended that construction resume on SKN-5/6 in October 2017 by approximately a three-fifths majority.

Breakdown by site
Plant	Town	Province	Primary technology	Current capacity (MWe)	Planned capacity (MWe)
Kori	Gijang	Busan	PWR	6040	7937
Hanul (formerly Ulchin)	Uljin	Gyeongbuk	PWR	5900	8700
Wolsong	Gyeongju	Gyeongbuk	PHWR/PWR	2779	4779
Hanbit (formerly Yeonggwang)	Yeonggwang	Jeonnam	PWR	5900	5900
Cheonji (cancelled)	Yeongdeok	Gyeongbuk	PWR	3000	3000

=== Breakdown by reactor ===
Plant name	Unit No.	Type	Model	Status	Capacity (MW)	Begin building	Commercial operation (planned)	Closed
Hanbit	1	PWR	WH F	Operational	960	4 Jun 1981	25 Aug 1986	
Hanbit	2	PWR	WH F	Operational	958	10 Dec 1981	10 Jun 1987	
Hanbit	3	PWR	OPR-1000	Operational	997	23 Dec 1989	31 Mar 1995	
Hanbit	4	PWR	OPR-1000	Operational	997	26 May 1990	1 Jan 1996	
Hanbit	5	PWR	OPR-1000	Operational	997	29 Jun 1997	21 May 2002	
Hanbit	6	PWR	OPR-1000	Operational	995	20 Nov 1997	24 Dec 2002	
Hanul	1	PWR	CP1 (France)	Operational	960	26 Jan 1983	10 Sep 1988	
Hanul	2	PWR	CP1 (France)	Operational	962	5 Jul 1983	30 Sep 1989	
Hanul	3	PWR	OPR-1000	Operational	994	21 Jul 1993	11 Aug 1998	
Hanul	4	PWR	OPR-1000	Operational	998	1 Nov 1993	31 Dec 1999	
Hanul	5	PWR	OPR-1000	Operational	996	1 Oct 1999	29 Jul 2004	
Hanul	6	PWR	OPR-1000	Operational	996	29 Sep 2000	22 Apr 2005	
Shin-Hanul	1	PWR	APR-1400	Operational	1340	10 Jul 2012	7 Dec 2022	
Shin-Hanul	2	PWR	APR-1400	Operational	1340	19 Jul 2012	5 Apr 2024	
Shin-Hanul	3	PWR	APR-1400	Under construction	1340	20 May 2025	(2032)	
Shin-Hanul	4	PWR	APR-1400	Under construction	1340	29 May 2026	(2033)	
Kori	1	PWR	WH 60	Shut down	576	27 Apr 1972	29 Apr 1978	18 Jun 2017
Kori	2	PWR	WH F	Operational	640	4 Dec 1977	25 Jul 1983	
Kori	3	PWR	WH F	Operational	1011	1 Oct 1979	30 Sep 1985	
Kori	4	PWR	WH F	Operational	1012	1 Apr 1980	29 Apr 1986	
Shin-Kori	1	PWR	OPR-1000	Operational	996	16 Jun 2006	28 Feb 2011	
Shin-Kori	2	PWR	OPR-1000	Operational	996	5 Jun 2007	20 Jul 2012	
Saeul	1	PWR	APR-1400	Operational	1416	16 Oct 2008	15 Jan 2016	
Saeul	2	PWR	APR-1400	Operational	1418	19 Aug 2009	29 Aug 2019	
Saeul	3	PWR	APR-1400	Under construction	1400	1 Apr 2017		
Saeul	4	PWR	APR-1400	Under construction	1400	20 Sep 2018		
Wolsong	1	PHWR	CANDU-6	Shut down	657	30 Oct 1977	22 Apr 1983	24 Dec 2019
Wolsong	2	PHWR	CANDU-6	Operational	655	22 Jun 1992	1 Jul 1997	
Wolsong	3	PHWR	CANDU-6	Operational	684	17 Mar 1994	1 Jul 1998	
Wolsong	4	PHWR	CANDU-6	Operational	688	22 Jul 1994	1 Oct 1999	
Shin-Wolsong	1	PWR	OPR-1000	Operational	991	20 Nov 2007	31 Jul 2012	
Shin-Wolsong	2	PWR	OPR-1000	Operational	960	23 Sep 2008	26 Feb 2015	

== History ==
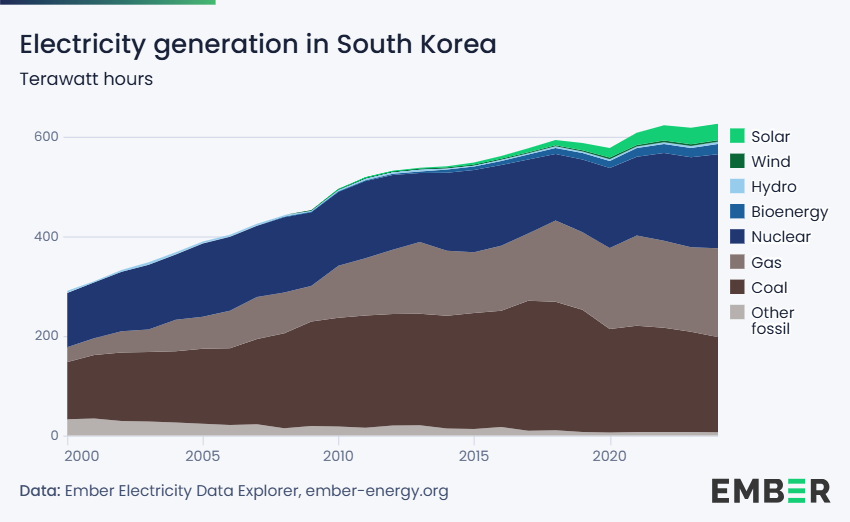
Electricity generation in South Korea in terawatt hours.

In 1962, Korea's first research reactor achieved criticality. According to declassified U.S. government documents, the CIA discovered in 1975 that the Park dictatorship may have been pursuing a nuclear weapons program, but the Ford administration worked with France and Canada to convince Seoul to back down from a plan to acquire plutonium production capability - instead working out a technical agreement that helped South Korea develop a peaceful nuclear program.

Kori Nuclear Power Plant was the first plant in Korea to commence commercial operations in 1978. Since then, 19 more reactors have since been built using a mixture of CANDU (4 reactors) and PWR (16 reactors) technology.

According to the South Korean Ministry for a Knowledge Economy, the APR-1400's fuel costs are 23 percent lower than France-based Areva's EPR, known to be the most advanced nuclear power plant in the world. The government is also planning development of a new nuclear plant design, which will have 10 percent higher capacity and a safety rating better than the APR-1400. South Korea's nuclear power plants currently are operating at a rate of 93.4 percent, higher than the comparable U.S. operation rate of 89.9 percent, France's 76.1 percent, and Japan's 59.2 percent. South Korean nuclear plants have repeatedly recorded the lowest rate of emergency shutdowns in the world, a record due in large part to highly standardised design and operating procedures. The APR-1400 is designed, engineered, built and operated to meet the latest international regulatory requirements concerning safety, including those for aircraft impact resistance.

South Korea has also developed KSTAR (a.k.a. Korea Superconducting Tokamak Advanced Research), an advanced superconducting tokamak fusion research device.

In December 2010, Malaysia expressed interest in procuring South Korea's nuclear reactor technology. South Korea was also pursuing opportunities in Turkey and Indonesia, as well as in India and the People's Republic of China.

In October 2011, South Korea hosted of a series of events to raise public awareness about nuclear power. The events were coordinated by the Korea Nuclear Energy Promotion Agency (KONEPA) and included the participation of the French Atomic Forum (FAF); the International Atomic Energy Agency (IAEA); as well as public relations and information experts from countries that generate or plan to generate nuclear power.

In November 2012 it was discovered that over 5,000 small components used in five reactors at Yeonggwang Nuclear Power Plant had not been properly certified; eight suppliers had faked 60 warranties for the parts. Two reactors were shut down for component replacement, which was likely to cause power shortages in South Korea during the winter. Reuters reported this as South Korea's worst nuclear crisis, highlighting a lack of transparency on nuclear safety and the dual roles of South Korea's nuclear regulators on supervision and promotion. This incident followed the prosecution of five senior engineers for the coverup of a serious loss of power and cooling incident at Kori Nuclear Power Plant, which was subsequently graded at INES level 2.

In 2013, there was a scandal involving the use of counterfeit parts in nuclear plants and faked quality assurance certificates. In June 2013 Kori 2 and Shin Wolsong 1 were shut down, and Kori 1 and Shin Wolsong 2 ordered to remain offline, until safety-related control cabling with forged safety certificates is replaced. Control cabling in the first APR-1400s under construction had to be replaced delaying construction by up to a year. In October 2013 about 100 people were indicted for falsifying safety documents, including a former chief executive of Korea Hydro & Nuclear Power and a vice-president of Korea Electric Power Corporation.

South Korean nuclear fusion reactor broke a record by superheating a plasma loop to 100 million degrees Celsius for 48 seconds in 2024. The Korea Institute of Fusion Energy (KFE) announced that KSTAR reactor broke its previous record of 31 seconds.

== Nuclear related organizations ==
The Korean Atomic Energy Research Institute (KAERI) is a government-funded research organization. The Korea Power Engineering Company, Inc. (KOPEC) engages in design, engineering, procurement and construction of nuclear power plants. The Korea Institute of Nuclear Safety (KINS) functions as the regulatory body of nuclear safety. The Korea Institute of Nuclear Nonproliferation And Control (KINAC) functions as the regulatory body of nuclear security and nonproliferation.

== Anti-nuclear movement ==
The anti-nuclear movement in South Korea consists of environmental groups, religious groups, unions, co-ops, and professional associations. In December 2011, protesters demonstrated in Seoul and other areas after the government announced it had picked sites for two new nuclear plants.

The East Coast Solidarity for Anti-Nuke Group was formed in January 2012. The group is against nuclear power and against plans for new nuclear power plants in Samcheok and Yeongdeok, and for the closure of existing nuclear reactors in Wolseong and Gori.

In January 2012, 22 South Korean women's groups made a plea for a nuclear free future. The women said they feel an enormous sense of crisis after the Fukushima nuclear disaster in March 2011, which demonstrated the destructive power of radiation in the loss of human lives, environmental pollution, and contamination of food.

Choi Yul, president of the Korea Green Foundation, has said "The March 11 disaster has proven that nuclear power plants are not safe". Choi said antinuclear sentiment is growing in South Korea amid the Fukushima crisis, and there is a chance to reverse the country's nuclear policy in 2012 because South Korea is facing a presidential election. In 2014, a professor of atomic engineering at Seoul National University stated that "The public has totally lost trust in nuclear power".

== Nuclear Non-Proliferation ==
South Korea initiated a secret weapons research program in the early 1970s under President Park Chung-hee but eventually abandoned it. The country subsequently ratified the Treaty on the Non-Proliferation of Nuclear Weapons (NPT) in April 1975.

== Nuclear research ==
Research reactors:

- KRR-1 (Korea Research Reactor No. 1) General Atomics TRIGA Mark II (TRIGA-Mark II) Research Reactor, 100 kW, built 1962 (decommissioned)
- KRR-2 (Korea Research Reactor No. 2), General Atomics TRIGA Mark III Research Reactor, 2MW, BUILT 1972 (decommissioned)
- AGN 201 SUWON, Kyung Hee University, Aerojet General Nucleonics Model 201 Research reactor, 0.01 kW commissioned 1982
- High-Flux Advanced Neutron Application Reactor (HANARO), MAPLE class reactor
- KSTAR Reactor

== Nuclear exports ==
In 2022, South Korea’s state-owned Korea Hydro & Nuclear Power (KHNP) secured a US$2.25 billion contract to supply equipment and construct buildings and infrastructure for Egypt’s El Dabaa Nuclear Power Plant, which will house four VVER-1200 reactors built by Russia’s state-owned nuclear company Rosatom.

== See also ==
- Energy in South Korea
- One Less Nuclear Power Plant, energy conservation policy of Seoul

== Bibliography ==
- "Nuclear Power in Korea". Information Papers. World Nuclear Association (WNA). February 2012.
- "Korea, Republic of". Power Reactor Information System (PRIS). International Atomic Energy Agency (IAEA). Archived from the original on 2012-05-06.
- Nuclear Transparency in the Asia Pacific: Nuclear reactor maps: Korea
- To Authorize the President to Extend the Term of the Agreement for Cooperation Between the Government of the United States of America and the Government of the Republic of Korea Concerning Civil Uses of Nuclear Energy for a Period Not to Exceed March 19, 2016: Report (To Accompany H.R. 2449) (Including Cost Estimate of the Congressional Budget Office) United States House Committee on Foreign Affairs
