= 2021 North Korea nuclear power plant construction incident =

In 2021, controversies arose from an investigation by South Korean prosecutors into forged documents related to the Wolseong Nuclear Power Plant. The administration of South Korean president Moon Jae-in was accused in late January of pushing for the construction of a nuclear power plant in North Korea. The Moon administration claimed that the accusations of secretly pushing for the construction of a nuclear power plant in North Korea were untrue, stating that the relevant documents were internal research materials and did not represent the position of the South Korean government.

== Background and events ==
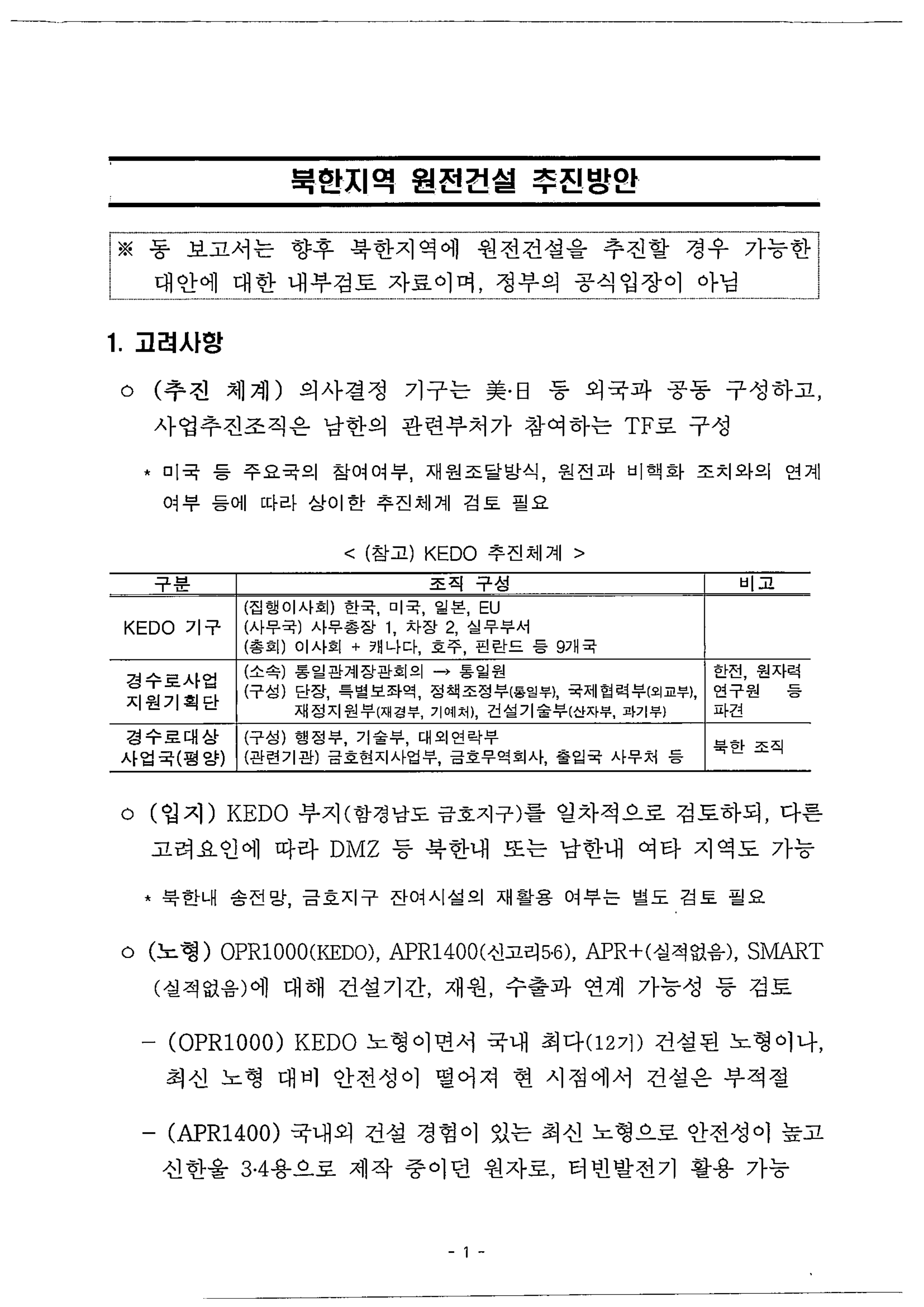
Version 1.1 of the document "Promoting North Korea's Construction of Nuclear Power Plants" released by the South Korean Ministry of Trade, Industry and Energy. The image shows the first page of this document.

On 24 December 2019, the Korea Atomic Energy Commission approved the proposal made by Korea Hydro & Nuclear Power in February 2018 to permanently close Unit 1 of the Wolseong Nuclear Power Plant. The National Assembly suspected that Korea Hydro & Nuclear Power had falsified the documents regarding the decision to close the plant ahead of schedule and requested the Board of Audit and Inspection (BAI) to conduct an investigation. The BAI's audit report, published on 20 October 2020, failed to conclude whether the early closure of Unit 1 of the Wolseong Nuclear Power Plant was appropriate, only believing that the economics of the Wolseong Nuclear Power Plant had been unreasonably underestimated, and requested that the Ministry of Trade, Industry and Energy punish two civil servants who deliberately deleted relevant documents of Unit 1 of the Wolseong Nuclear Power Plant.

On 2 December 2020, the Daejeon District Prosecutors' Office obtained approval from the Prosecutor General of South Korea to apply for arrest warrants for three Ministry of Trade, Industry and Energy officials suspected of destroying public electronic records. Subsequently, in late January 2021, the Criminal Division 5 of the Daejeon District Prosecutors' Office investigated the Ministry of Trade, Industry and Energy officials suspected of obstructing the inspection by the Board of Audit and Inspection. It was found that the officials of the Ministry deleted 530 documents related to Unit 1 of the Wolseong Nuclear Power Plant. Among the deleted documents were folders named "pohjois" (Note: Finnish word of "north".) and "Northern Nuclear Push". (Note: Korean: 북원추; Hanja: 北原推 is an abbreviation for “North Korean nuclear power plant promotion”.(Korean: 북한 원전 추진; Hanja: 北韓原電推進)) On 29 January the Ministry of Unification stated that there were no cases of promoting the construction of a nuclear power plant in North Korea in the inter-Korean cooperation matters since 2018. Minister of Unification Lee In-young also stated on 1 February that the Ministry had urgently checked the documents but found no information involving specific construction plans.

Data shows that the civil servant deleted 17 documents on 1 December 2019, regarding the support plan for North Korea. Among them, the document concerning the promotion of North Korea's construction of a nuclear power plant had version 1.1 made on 14 May 2018, and version 1.2 made the next day. Unlike other documents, it was marked with "commander's revision" or "BH report". (Note: "BH" is an abbrevation of the Blue House.) Among the relevant documents, there were three different plans to support North Korea, namely, the construction of the Shin-Kori Nuclear Power Plant Units 5 and 6 in the Geumho area of South Hamgyong Province, where the light-water reactor was originally planned by the Korean Peninsula Energy Development Organization, the construction of a nuclear power plant in the demilitarized zone, and the completion of the transmission of electricity from the Hanul Nuclear Power Plant Units 3 and 4 to North Korea.

On 31 January, the Ministry of Trade, Industry and Energy held a press conference and stated that the relevant documents were only internal discussions on the idea of energy cooperation between the two Koreas which were not implemented. The Ministry also stated that the accusation that the South Korean government secretly promoted the construction of a nuclear power plant in North Korea was false, and that the relevant documents were only internal research materials and were not the position of the government. In addition, per the Ministry, the release of the documents would affect the court's handling of the case, hence their refusal to disclose these documents, before the Ministry of Trade, Industry and Energy released one of the documents the following day. The document proposed a plan which indicated that construction could be considered in the Geumho area of South Hamgyong Province, where the Korean Peninsula Energy Development Organization is located, or in other areas of North Korea or South Korea.

== Subsequent reactions ==
The People Power Party (PPP), South Korea's main opposition party, demanded an investigation into the officials and the reasons behind North Korea's push to build a nuclear power plant, alongside demanding the release of the contents of the USB drive that South Korean President Moon Jae-in handed to North Korean leader Kim Jong Un at the inter-Korean summit. The Blue House stated that the opposition's claim that "the government attempted to secretly build a nuclear power plant for North Korea" was a bottomless political tactic and McCarthyism. The Blue House was unaware concerning the question of whether the USB drive provided to Kim Jong Un at the inter-Korean summit contained specific directions and methods for building the power plant. Chung Eui-yong, former head of the National Security Office of the Blue House and incoming Foreign Minister, said that the documents on the new economic initiative provided to Kim Jong Un included ideas in the energy and electricity sectors. They only made preliminary mentions of cooperation on new renewable energy, maintenance of old hydroelectric and thermal power plants in North Korea, the Northeast Asian super grid including Mongolia, and that the documents did not mention nuclear power at all. They also shared the same USB drive data with the US government.

On 31 January, Yoon Joon-byung, a member of the ruling Democratic Party, refuted the opposition's claims on his personal Facebook page, stating that of the 550 documents, more than 220 were ideas from the Park Geun-hye administration, including internal documents proposing the construction of a nuclear power plant in North Korea. Of the deleted documents, only about 30 were created by the Moon Jae-in administration, mostly economic assessment reports for Unit 1 of the Wolsong-ha Power Plant. Shin Young-dae, a spokesperson for the Democratic Party, said on the same day that the idea of building a nuclear power plant in North Korea existed as early as 2010 during the administration of President Lee Myung-bak. He also expressed disappointment at the criticism from the largest opposition party, which he said had lost its ability to make realistic judgments.

Jung Ho-jin, chief spokesperson for the opposition Justice Party, said that the criticism of the PPP was "impossible even to imagine, even a three-year-old would know that." He also criticized the PPP's questioning of the government at a press conference, saying that the PPP exaggerated the doubts by comparing the inter-Korean summit to some big deal, and that the PPP's enthusiasm for political offensives was "shameless and irresponsible." The Democratic Party also criticized the PPP, saying that the opposition party and conservative groups once again showed the "theory of national subjugation" on the eve of the election, and that the opposition party's imagination of accusing the government of secretly promoting the construction of a nuclear power plant in North Korea was laughable. According to an editorial in the The Dong-A Ilbo, this incident was close to the by-elections for mayors of Seoul and Busan, and was also a prelude to the presidential election in March 2022. Moreover, the opposition party had suffered consecutive defeats in the National Assembly elections, local elections and presidential elections in the last four years. This mayoral by-election pushed it to an important crossroads. The Nikkei also pointed out that this incident had become a powerful weapon for the conservative opposition party that hoped to overthrow the left-wing government.

The Chosun Ilbo pointed out that after the inter-Korean summit, some media outlets gave the footage to lip-reading experts for analysis and found that Moon Jae-in did indeed talk to Kim Jong Un about "the power plant issue...". In response, former Blue House staffer Cho Han-ki said that at the time, as the president's direct secretary, he and Kim Chang-son of the North Korean side were on standby at the meeting, and the meeting was broadcast live to the world. He also said that except for his bedtime, he was almost always by the president's side and had never heard of any proposal to build a nuclear power plant for North Korea. Democratic Party leader Lee Nak-yon also refuted the relevant claims when he delivered a speech to the National Assembly on 2 February as a representative of the negotiating group and pointed out that the issue of "aiding North Korea to build a nuclear power plant" was not discussed at the inter-Korean summit.

Shin Beom-cheol, former policy planning officer of the South Korean Ministry of Foreign Affairs, told Voice of America, “The South Korean government’s position is that it only discussed how to provide energy according to North Korea’s denuclearization stage, and therefore does not violate UN sanctions. The truth is actually still unclear and awaits investigation by the prosecution.” Olli Heinonen, former deputy director general of the International Atomic Energy Agency, said in an interview with Voice of America on 2 February that nuclear power plants are not facilities that can be built by North and South Korea alone. He also said that if North Korea does not rejoin the Treaty on the Prohibition of Nuclear Weapons, it will be impossible to build a nuclear reactor in its territory. When South Korean Prime Minister Chung Sye-kyun was questioned by the National Assembly on 4 February, he also said that the conditions for building a nuclear power plant in North Korea were North Korea’s return to the Treaty on the Prohibition of Nuclear Weapons, acceptance of inspection by the International Atomic Energy Agency, and negotiation with the US government.

== Aftermath ==
=== Questions about South Korea's nuclear phase-out policy ===
On 19 June 2017, South Korean President Moon Jae-in visited the Kori Nuclear Power Plant and vowed to abolish all plans for new nuclear power plants in South Korea. As for nuclear power units awaiting decommissioning, their service life would not be extended. The report disclosed in this incident showed that the South Korean government discussed building nuclear power plants for North Korea based on providing electricity assistance to North Korea. However, South Korea stated at the time that there would be no new nuclear power plants built in the country. Regarding this incident, former National Assembly member Na Kyung-won of the PPP raised questions, saying, "Is South Korea going to eliminate nuclear power plants? Is it going to 'pay tribute' to North Korea with nuclear power plants?" Ahn Cheol-soo, the leader of the People's Party, said on Facebook, "If it is true that we interrupted nuclear power plants but built nuclear power plants in North Korea, anyone who sees this will feel speechless and contradictory." He called on the government to find out the truth in front of the people.

=== Driving the mystery of natural gas power plants ===
Lee Cheol-kyu, a member of the National Assembly from the PPP, released a document completed in 2019, which indicated that a senior executive of the Korea Gas Corporation met with Lee Ho-nam, an advisor to the Korean National Economic Cooperation Association, and proposed to assist North Korea in building a natural gas power plant. In response, the Ministry of Unification stated that the meeting was in accordance with the procedures of the Inter-Korean Exchange and Cooperation Act and that a relevant report had been completed. It also pointed out that the meeting was to explore the possibility of restarting inter-Korean economic cooperation and denied the claim that North Korea was assisting in building a natural gas power plant.

=== Korea Oil Corporation has also explored related initiatives to promote construction. ===
Yoon Young-seok, a member of the National Assembly from the PPP, released a research report on the current state of North Korea's energy and cooperation plans for the natural gas industry, commissioned by the Korea Petroleum Corporation in July 2018 and produced by the Kookmin University Industry-Academy Cooperation Group. The research funding was 51 million won, and the report also discussed the possibility of assisting North Korea in building a nuclear power plant. The Korea Gas Corporation stated that the report was based on the 2018 discussions on economic cooperation between South and North Korea and explored energy issues including railways, and that it was not just about building a nuclear power plant in North Korea, but rather an academic study based on the entire energy sector that had no political intentions whatsoever.
