= Wolseong Nuclear Power Plant =

Nuclear power plant in Yangnam-myeon, North Gyeongsang, South Korea

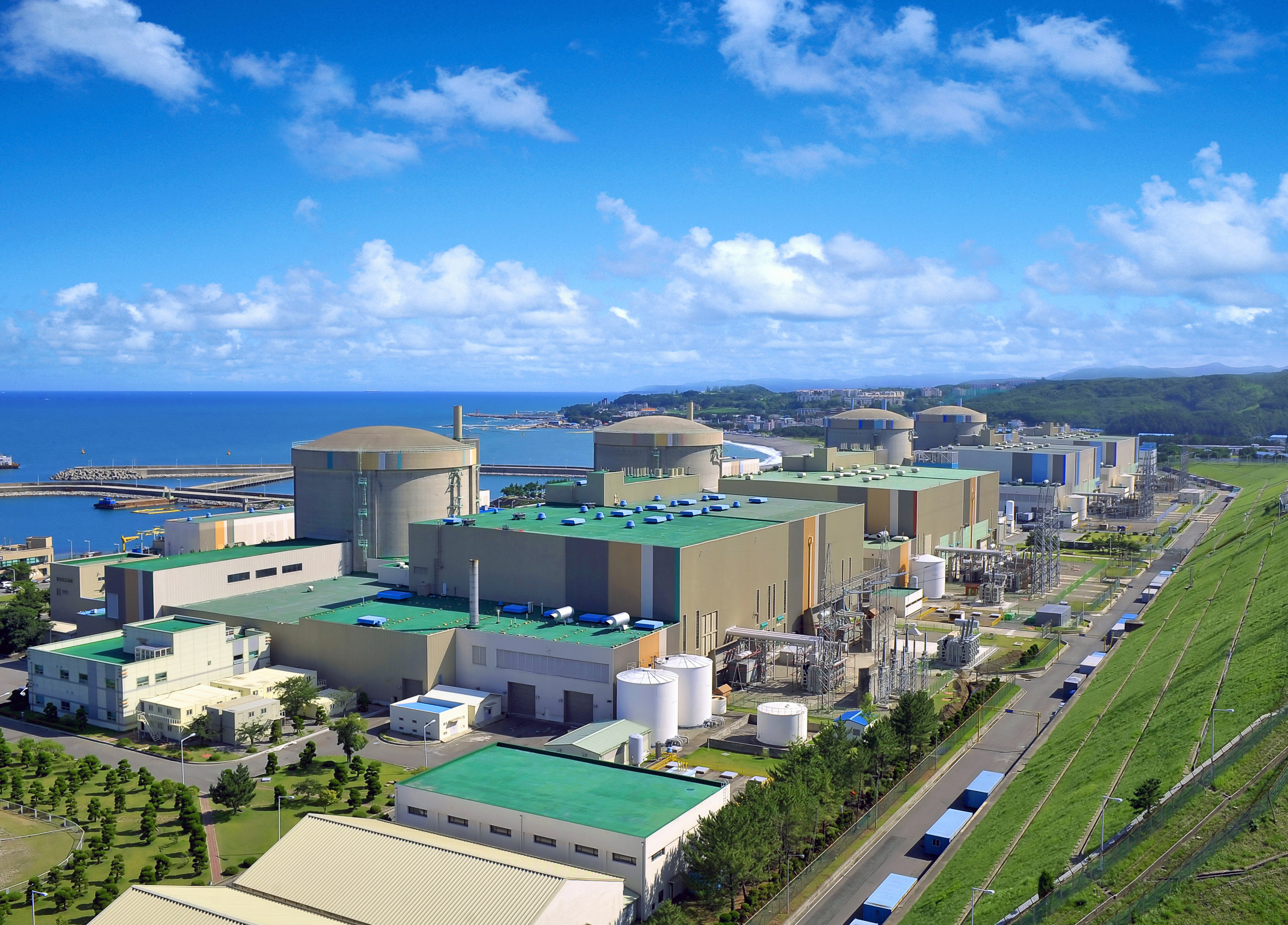
- Official name: 월성원자력발전소 月城原子力發電所
- Country: South Korea
- Location: Gyeongju, North Gyeongsang
- Coordinates: 35°43′0″N 129°28′40″E
- Status: Operational
- Construction began: Unit 1: October 30, 1977; Unit 2: September 25, 1992; Unit 3: March 17, 1994; Unit 4: July 22, 1994; Unit 5: November 20, 2007; Unit 6: September 23, 2008
- Commission date: Unit 1: April 22, 1983; Unit 2: July 1, 1997; Unit 3: July 1, 1998; Unit 4: October 1, 1999; Unit 5: July 31, 2012; Unit 6: July 24, 2015
- Decommission date: Unit 1: December 24, 2019
- Owner: Korea Hydro & Nuclear Power
- Operator: Korea Hydro & Nuclear Power

Nuclear power station
- Reactor type: CANDU PHWR; PWR
- Reactor supplier: AECL; KEPCO E&C
- Cooling source: Sea of Japan
- Thermal capacity: 3 × 2061 MW_{th} 2 × 2825 MW_{th}

Power generation
- Units operational: 1 × 576 MW; 1 × 601 MW; 1 × 567 MW; 1 × 997 MW; 1 × 993 MW
- Make and model: 4 × CANDU-6; 2 × OPR-1000
- Units decommissioned: 1 × 657 MW
- Nameplate capacity: 3734 MW
- Capacity factor: 75.25%
- Annual net output: 30,310 GW·h (2016)

External links
- Commons: Related media on Commons

The Wolseong Nuclear Power Plant, or Wolsong, is a nuclear power plant located on the coast near Nae-ri, Yangnam-myeon, Gyeongju, North Gyeongsang province, South Korea. It is the only South Korean nuclear power plant operating CANDU-type PHWR (Pressurized Heavy Water Reactors). Korea Hydro & Nuclear Power owns the plant. These reactors are capable of consuming multiple types of fuel, including wastes from South Korea's other nuclear plants.

The power plant site including Yangnam-myeon. Yangbuk-myeon and Gampo-eup was designated an industrial infrastructure development zone in 1976. Construction of Wolseong 1 started in 1976 and was completed in 1982. In the following year, the power plant began commercial operations. This PHWR reactor has a gross generation capacity of 678 MW. Wolseong reactors 2, 3 and 4 were completed in 1997, 1998 and 1999, respectively. Each of these reactors has a capacity of 700 MW. Wolseong Nuclear Plant has since operated successfully.

Wolseong Nuclear Power Plant supplies about 5% of South Korea's electricity.

== Shin-Wolsong Nuclear Power Plant ==
Shin-Wolsong No. 1 and No. 2, are two new OPR-1000 type pressurized water reactors. Shin-Wolsong 1 became fully operational in July 2012.

In June 2013 Shin-Wolsong 1 was shut down, and Shin-Wolsong 2 ordered to remain offline, until safety-related control cabling with forged safety certificates is replaced. Shin Wolsong-1 was approved for restart in January 2014. In November 2014, Shin Wolsong-2 loaded its first core of nuclear fuel, and the plant was connected to the grid in February 2015, with commercial operation commencing in July 2015.

| Unit | Type | Capacity (net) | Construction start | Operation start | Notes |
|---|---|---|---|---|---|
Phase I
| Wolsong-1 | CANDU-6 | 657 MW | 30 Oct 1977 | 22 April 1983 | Unit placed in Permanent Shutdown in 2019. |
| Wolsong-2 | CANDU-6 | 576 MW | 22 June 1992 | 1 July 1997 | |
| Wolsong-3 | CANDU-6 | 601 MW | 17 March 1994 | 1 July 1998 | |
| Wolsong-4 | CANDU-6 | 567 MW | 22 July 1994 | 1 Oct 1999 | |
Phase II
| Shin Wolsong-1 | OPR-1000 | 997 MW | 20 Nov 2007 | 31 July 2012 | |
| Shin Wolsong-2 | OPR-1000 | 993 MW | 23 Sept 2008 | 24 July 2015 | |

== Incidents ==
On 22 June 2024, 2.3 tons of storage water in the spent nuclear fuel storage tank was released into the ocean through a drain while Wolsong Unit 4 was suspended for planned preventive maintenance and was undergoing regular inspections.

On 12 January 2025, 29 tons of radioactive waste from the liquid material storage tank of Wolsong Unit 2 was discharged into the ocean without undergoing sampling analysis.

On 9 September 2025, 265 kilograms of heavy water was leaked from Wolsong Unit 2 reactor.

== See also ==
- 2021 North Korea nuclear power plant construction promotion document incident
- Kori Nuclear Power Plant
- Nuclear power in South Korea
- List of nuclear reactors#South Korea
