= KSNP =

KSNP can refer to:

- KSNP (FM), a radio station (97.7 FM) licensed to serve Burlington, Kansas, United States
- Kalat State National Party, a Baloch nationalist political party in Balochistan
- Kuala Selangor Nature Park, a park located by the mouth of Selangor River, near the center of Kuala Selangor, Malaysia
- Korean Standardized Nuclear Plant, a series of South Korean nuclear reactors, including the OPR-1000 and APR-1400 designs.
