= OPR-1000 =

South Korean nuclear reactor

The OPR-1000 is a South Korean-designed two-loop 1000 MWe PWR Generation II nuclear reactor, developed by KHNP and KEPCO. The OPR-1000 was originally designated as the Korean Standard Nuclear Power Plant (KSNP), and was re-designated as the OPR-1000 in 2005 for foreign sales. It was developed based on the Combustion Engineering (C-E)'s system 80 design, through a technology transfer agreement. The reactor core design was derived from the C-E designed Arkansas Nuclear One Unit 2, the nuclear steam supply system (NSSS) was derived from the C-E designed units at Palo Verde Nuclear Generating Station, and auxiliary plant design was derived from the earlier Unit-1 and Unit-2 at the Yeonggwang (now Hanbit) Nuclear Power Plant.

Based on the OPR-1000 design, KEPCO has developed a Generation III reactor uprated plant, the APR-1400.

== Reactor fleet ==
The reference plants used to develop the OPR-1000 design using technology transfer are Yeonggwang (now Hanbit) Unit-3 and Unit-4, which came on-line in 1995 and 1996, respectively. The first plants designated as OPR-1000 plants are Ulchin (now Hanul) Unit-3 and Unit-4, which came on-line in 1998 and 1999, respectively.

Korea Hydro & Nuclear Power (KHNP) states an improved OPR-1000 design has been implemented at eight units:

- Hanbit Unit-5 and Unit-6 (both on-line in 2002)
- Hanul Unit-5 (on-line in 2004) and Unit-6 (on-line in 2005)
- Shin Kori Nuclear Power Plant Unit-1 (on-line in 2011) and Unit-2 (on-line in 2012)
- Shin-Wolsong Nuclear Power Plant Unit-1 (on-line in 2012) and Unit-2 (on-line in 2015)

Including the reference Unit-3 and Unit-4 at Hanbit (formerly Yeonggwang), there are a total of twelve OPR-1000 plants, all inside South Korea.

OPR-1000 Summary
Site	Unit	Status	Construction Start	First Criticality	Operation
Hanbit	3 (Note: Reference design unit)	operational	23 December 1989	13 October 1994	31 March 1995
Hanbit	4	operational	26 May 1990	7 July 1995	1 January 1996
Hanbit	5 (Note: Improved design)	operational	29 June 1997	24 November 2001	21 May 2002 (Note: Forced shut down in 2012 due to fraudulently-certified parts)
Hanbit	6	operational	20 November 1997	1 September 2002	24 December 2002
Hanul	3	operational	21 July 1993	21 December 1997	11 August 1998
Hanul	4	operational	1 November 1993	14 December 1998	31 December 1999
Hanul	5	operational	1 October 1999	28 November 2003	29 July 2004
Hanul	6	operational	29 September 2000	16 December 2004	22 April 2005
Shin-Kori	1	operational	16 June 2006	15 July 2010	28 February 2011 (Note: Forced shut down in 2013 due to fraudulently-certified cables)
Shin-Kori	2	operational	5 June 2007	27 December 2011	20 July 2012
Shin-Wolsong	1	operational	20 November 2007	6 January 2012	31 July 2012
Shin-Wolsong	2	operational	23 September 2008	8 February 2015 (Note: Delayed due to fraudulently-certified cables)	24 July 2015

=== Notes ===
The first plants incorporating the APR-1400 design are still under construction. Ten units are planned:

- Unit-1 and Unit-2 at Shin Hanul Nuclear Power Plant in South Korea
- Unit-3, -4, -5 and -6 at Shin Kori Nuclear Power Plant in South Korea
- Unit-1, -2, -3 and -4 at Barakah Nuclear Power Plant in the United Arab Emirates.

== History ==
The first start of the OPR-1000 at Shin Kori Nuclear Power Plant Unit-1 was 28 February 2011.

This OPR-1000's first malfunction was noted on 2 October 2012 at 8:10 a.m. Shin Kori-1 was shut down after a warning signal indicated a malfunction in the control rod, which is used to control the rate of fission of nuclear materials, according to the Korea Hydro & Nuclear Power Co. It is the first time that reactor, located 450 kilometers southeast of Seoul, has been shut down due to a malfunction since it began commercial operation on 28 Feb. 2011. An investigation was undertaken to verify the exact cause of the problem.

In 2012, a probe was opened regarding some fraudulently-certified parts installed in five OPR-1000 reactors over a ten-year period. Hanbit-5 and -6, which had a greater number of fraudulent parts, were shut down until the parts could be replaced, and Hanbit-3 and -4 and Hanul-3 were allowed remain on-line pending parts replacement. Hanbit-5 and -6 were cleared for restart in early 2013, but in April 2013, following a tip, four additional units were shut down and not allowed to restart until fraudulently-certified safety-related control cabling was replaced: Shin Kori-1 and -2 and Shin Wolsong-1 and -2; although construction on Shin Wolsong-2 was complete, it had not yet achieved operational status, and it was not allowed to start up until cabling was replaced. The same cabling was used at the APR-1400 units then under construction at Shin Kori (Units 3 & 4), forcing a year-long delay in their startup. After cabling was replaced, Shin Kori-1 and -2 and Shin Wolsong-1 were approved for restart in January 2014. Shin Wolsong-2 was connected to the grid in February 2015, with commercial operation commencing in July 2015.

== APR1000 ==
A variant incorporating a number of advanced features from the larger APR-1400 design, named the APR1000, has been designed for European use. It was certified as compliant by the European Utility Requirements (EUR) organisation in March 2023. The assessment was requested in November 2019, and the assessment started in February 2021. It will still require design approval in each country it is used in.

KHNP is in an intellectual property legal dispute with Westinghouse, which claims Westinghouse technology is incorporated in the APR1000 design, while KHNP claims the APR1000 is an independently developed design.

== See also ==
- Nuclear power in South Korea
