= Nuclear power in the United Arab Emirates =

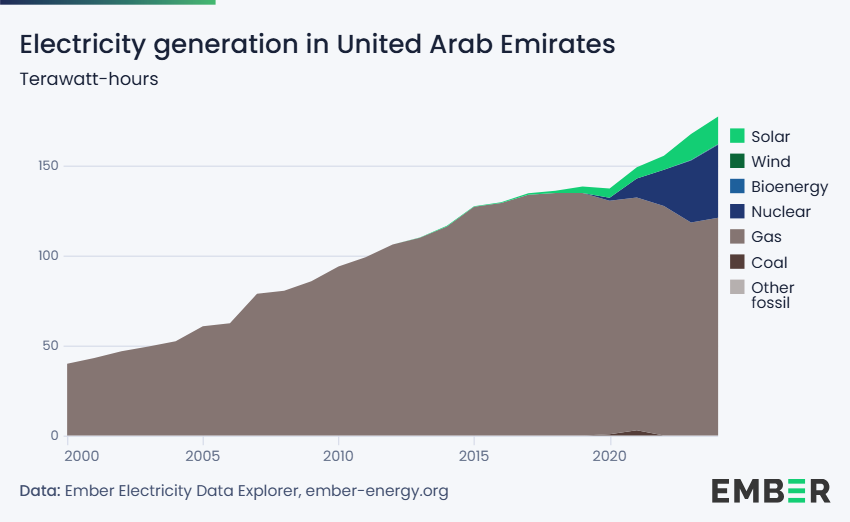
Electricity generation in the United Arab Emirates in terawatt-hours (nuclear power in dark blue)

Nuclear power in the United Arab Emirates is the generation of nuclear power through nuclear reactors in the United Arab Emirates (UAE). The UAE currently operates four nuclear reactors in Barakah Nuclear Power Plant which generates 25% of the country electricity need.

The UAE is signatory to the Nuclear Non-Proliferation Treaty (NPT), along with the additional protocol. Future reactors are under consideration, but none have been confirmed.

== Nuclear power plants ==
=== Barakah Nuclear Power Plant ===
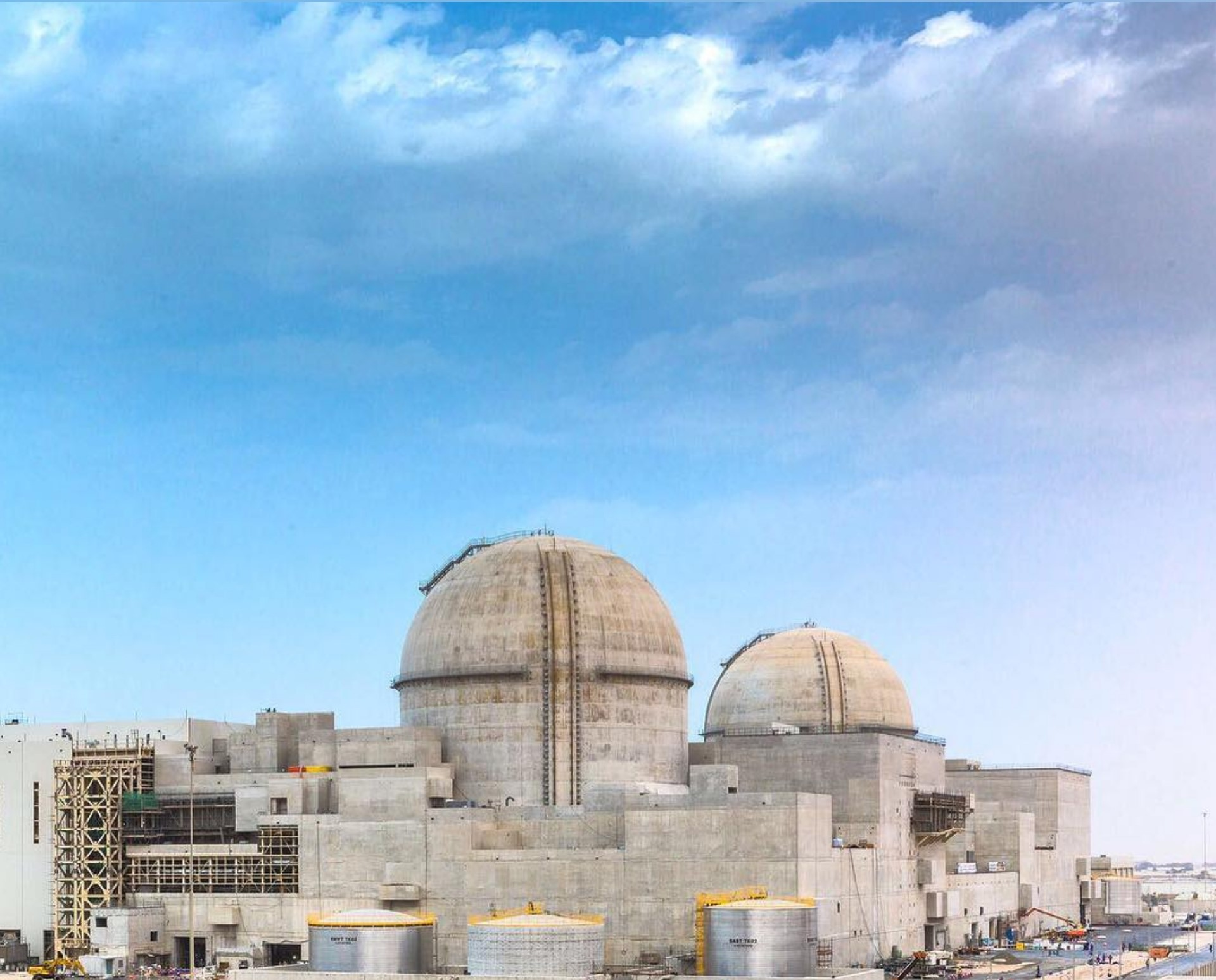
Barakah nuclear power plant, the United Arab Emirates first nuclear power plant.

The Barakah nuclear power plant is the first nuclear power station in the United Arab Emirates.

In April 2008, the UAE Government officially announced its interest in evaluating nuclear energy as an additional source to meet the country's growing energy demands.

In December 2009, Emirates Nuclear Energy Corporation (ENEC) awarded a coalition led by Korea Electric Power Corporation (KEPCO) a $20 billion bid to build the first nuclear power plant in the UAE. Barakah, about 50 km west of Ruwais, was chosen as the site. In 2011 Bloomberg reported that following detailed finance agreements, the build cost was put at $30 billion: $10 billion equity, $10 billion export-credit agency debt, and $10 billion from bank and sovereign debt. South Korea may earn a further $20 billion from operation, maintenance and fuel supply contracts. However, a later Bloomberg report indicates the price as $25 billion.

Construction began in 2012, and four APR-1400 nuclear reactors were planned to start operating successively between 2017 and 2020. The first reactor came online in 2020

As of March 2024, all four new nuclear reactors are now fully operational in the Barakah Nuclear station, producing 5,348 MWe of electricity and allowing the UAE to produce 40 TWh of electricity per year.

== Waste ==
The UAE has committed large resources in the appropriate disposal of atomic uranium waste products that are generated by running its Barakah Nuclear Power Plant. Committing to a "dual track" radioactive waste management technique that simultaneously develops the nation's self storage facilities of nuclear waste while also involving foreign governmental bodies and organizations to help process chemical waste.

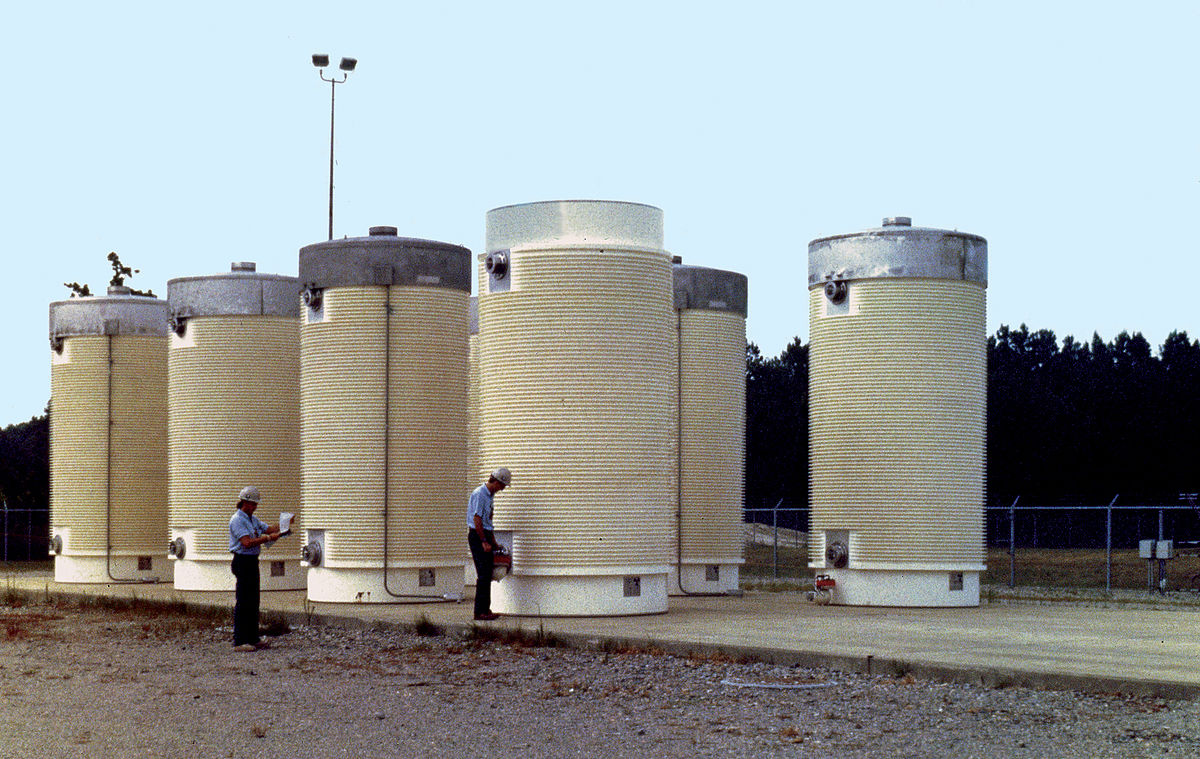
Dry cask storage.

In the UAE the Barakah Nuclear Powerplant has nuclear pool storage facilities that are able to contain 20 years worth of spent fuel waste before it is moved to longterm storage facility. These Long-term storage facilities are concrete and steel containers in which used nuclear waste are then stored called dry casks. Fuel Take back is a foreign strategy used by the UAE to collect used nuclear waste and return it to its suppliers. This fuel is then transferred to reprocessing facilities largely concentrated in France.

== Plant Decommissioning ==
Before the Barakah Nuclear power station's development, plans for decommissioning are put in place to ensure its appropriate disposal with respect to the environment around it. The process of plant decommissioning involves multiple departments and its planning includes a range of aspects that are considered at the early stages of development. These stages can consist of ensuring the original site's necessary finances, area, and redevelopment plans. The Nawah Energy Company, the operator of the functioning Barakah Power plant, has put decommissioning plans in part of its operational license about the governing Federal Authority for Nuclear Regulation (FANR). These plans ensure the appropriate disposal of critical nuclear elements five years after the nuclear reactor is shut down. The UAE's nuclear decommissioning process is set to follow a forecasted 13 years for each of the four functioning nuclear plants at the Barakah, managed by the Emirates Nuclear Energy Corporation (ENEC). In addition, along with the 20 billion dollar contract with South Korea's KEPCO, the partnership is planned to extensively cover the training programs, human resource development, and education programs that further include plans of decommission, ensuring that the UAE possesses the required skilled labor in the sophisticated decommissioning processes along with KEPCO for the Barakah Nuclear plants.

== Future Nuclear Power Plans in the UAE ==
The United Arab Emirates (UAE) has planned the addition of reactors in the Barakah facility in Abu Dhabi. As of 2023, the United Arab Emirates began talks with the South Korean Nuclear power contractor (KEPCO) Korea Hydro & Nuclear Power Co. to potentially develop two additional reactors to the existing four operational (APR 1400) reactors at the facility. The addition of two additional APR (1400) reactors project is estimated at $15.3 billion US dollars.

In addition, the UAE's nuclear operator (ENEC) launched the ADVANCE program in November 2023 to maximize its full expertise in Nuclear development programs. This ADVANCE program is set to evaluate Small Modular Reactors (SMRs) and Advanced reactor technologies aimed at providing domestic and international energy solutions.

== Nuclear regulation ==
The Policy of the United Arab Emirates on the Evaluation and Potential Development of Peaceful Nuclear Energy, otherwise known as the Nuclear Policy concluded that nuclear power emerged as a proven, environmentally promising and commercially competitive energy source compared to other options.

The Nuclear Policy also emphasised the establishment of an independent, vigilant and effective regulatory body as being the cornerstone of a stable, credible, safe, and secure nuclear programme.

The Federal Authority for Nuclear Regulation (FANR) was established on 24 September 2009 in accordance with the Federal Law by Decree No. 6 of 2009, Concerning the Peaceful Uses of Nuclear Energy, also known as the Nuclear Law.

From its headquarters in Abu Dhabi, FANR regulates the nuclear sector in the UAE in line with the Nuclear Policy, international treaties such as the Treaty on the Non-Proliferation of Nuclear Weapons (NPT), other agreements the UAE is a party to, and international best practices.

The U.S.–UAE 123 Agreement for Peaceful Civilian Nuclear Energy Cooperation has allowed nuclear technology transfer from the United States of America, and has been called the 'gold standard' of such transfer agreements.

== See also ==
- U.S.–UAE 123 Agreement for Peaceful Civilian Nuclear Energy Cooperation
- Energy in the United Arab Emirates
