= System 80 =

American nuclear reactor design

System 80 is a pressurized water reactor design by Combustion Engineering (which was subsequently bought by Asea Brown Boveri and eventually merged into the Westinghouse Electric Company). Three System 80 reactors were built at Palo Verde Nuclear Generating Station.

== System 80+ ==
An updated version of the plant has been designed which was given a "+" at the end of the name. This indicates an evolutionary plant design - changes were made to improve costs and safety.

The control rods differ by using both 12 finger CEAs (control element assemblies) and 4 finger CEAs. The 12 finger rods are more reactive and only used for shutdown, while the 4 finger CEAs are used to control reactivity smoothly during operation.

The System 80+ in 1993 was considered by members of the American Nuclear Society as the "premier" burner of weapons grade plutonium, as the reactor design can handle a full inventory of MOX plutonium. After the Cold War ended, 100 tons of surplus weapons grade plutonium existed and the System 80+ was assessed to be the best available way to "denature" it beyond use in typical bomb designs, the "burning"/fissioning process would produce reactor grade plutonium, which while still a security concern, it is considerably diminished.

The System 80+ was developed into the Korean OPR-1000 and later APR-1400, and contributed design features to the AP1000.

The NRC has certified the System 80+ for the U.S. market, but Westinghouse ceased actively promoting the design for domestic sale, prior to their bankruptcy.

== See also ==
- Generation II reactor
- WNP-3 and WNP-5
