= U.S.–UAE 123 Agreement for Peaceful Civilian Nuclear Energy Cooperation =

Agreement between countries

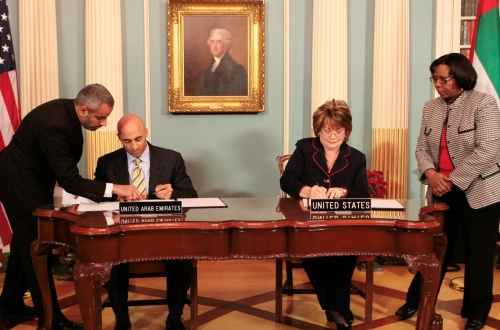
U.S. Under Secretary for Arms Control and International Security Ellen Tauscher and United Arab Emirates Ambassador Yousef Al Otaiba exchange diplomatic notes to bring the Agreement for Peaceful Civilian Nuclear Energy Cooperation into force. (17 December 2009)

The U.S.–UAE 123 Agreement for Peaceful Civilian Nuclear Energy Cooperation is a Section 123 Agreement on peaceful nuclear cooperation between the United States of America and the United Arab Emirates, which entered into force on 17 December 2009 and enables the UAE to receive nuclear know-how, materials and equipment from the U.S. As part of the agreement, the UAE committed to forgo domestic uranium enrichment and reprocessing of spent fuel, as well as sign the International Atomic Energy Agency's Additional Protocol, which institutes a more stringent inspections regime on the UAE's nuclear activities. The UAE's agreement to forgo enrichment and reprocessing has become known as the nonproliferation "gold standard" for nuclear cooperation agreements, because the signatory renounces the sensitive technology and capabilities that can also be used to produce a nuclear weapon.

== Background ==
On 15 January 2009, pursuant to Section 123 of the Atomic Energy Act of 1954, U.S. Secretary of State Condoleezza Rice and UAE Foreign Minister Abdullah bin Zayed Al Nahyan first signed a proposed bilateral agreement on peaceful nuclear cooperation at the close of the George W. Bush administration. Once the Barack Obama administration took office, the U.S. and UAE reopened the text for negotiation. On 21 May 2009, Deputy Secretary of State James Steinberg and UAE Ambassador to the United States Yousef Al Otaiba signed a new version of the agreement. On the same day, the Obama administration submitted the proposed agreement to U.S. Congress, which had the opportunity to review the proposed agreement until 17 October 2009, a period of 90 days of continuous session. On 26 October 2009, the UAE cabinet approved the agreement. The agreement entered into force on 17 December 2009 when the governments exchanged diplomatic notes.

=== Potential Impediment to Approval ===
On 23 April 2009, ABC News released a video of UAE Royal Sheikh Issa bin Zayed Al Nahyan, "the crown prince's brother torturing a man, allegedly because he cheated him on a grain deal." On 29 April 2009, CNN reported that the controversy over the torture tape was delaying the ratification of the US-UAE nuclear agreement. Ultimately, the tape didn't end up holding up the agreement, which was officially submitted to Congress by President Obama in May 2009 and endorsed by key Congressional leaders in the subsequent months.

== See also ==
- Nuclear power in the United Arab Emirates
- United Arab Emirates–United States relations
- Section 123 Agreement
