= Barakah nuclear power plant =

Nuclear power station in the United Arab Emirates

Barakah Nuclear Power Plant
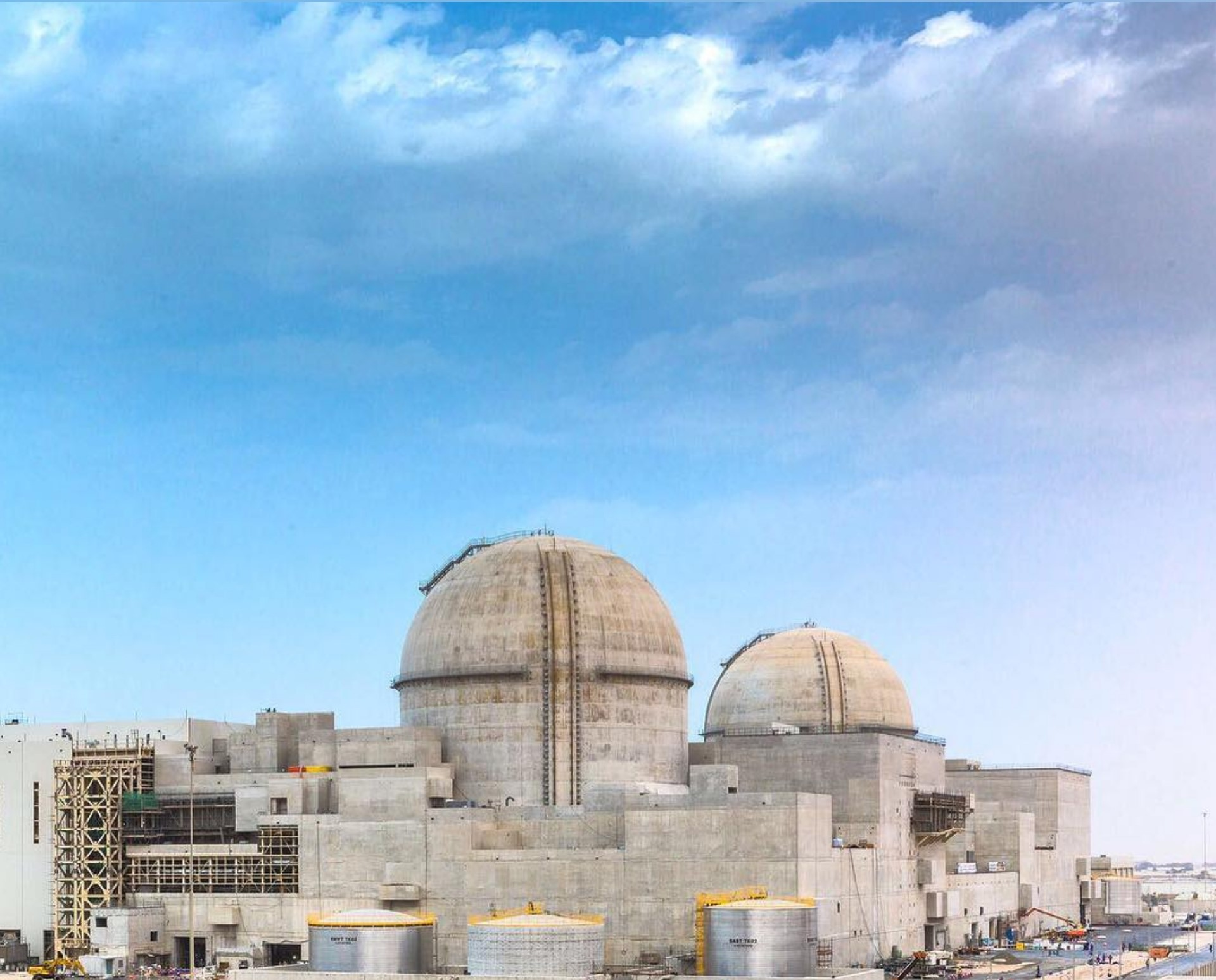
- Barakah nuclear power plant
- Official name: محطة براكة للطاقة النووية
- Country: United Arab Emirates
- Location: Approx. 50km west of Ruwais
- Coordinates: 23°58′04″N 52°13′54″E
- Status: Operational
- Construction began: Unit 1: 19 July 2012; Unit 2: 16 April 2013; Unit 3: 24 September 2014; Unit 4: 30 July 2015
- Commission date: Unit 1: 3 August 2020; Unit 2: 14 September 2021; Unit 3: 10 October 2022; Unit 4: 23 March 2024
- Construction cost: US$32 billion
- Owner: ENEC

Nuclear power station
- Reactor type: PWR
- Reactor supplier: KEPCO
- Cooling source: Persian Gulf
- Thermal capacity: 4 × 3983 MW_{th}

Power generation
- Units operational: 4 x 1345 MW
- Make and model: APR-1400
- Nameplate capacity: 5600 MW

External links
- Website: enec.gov.ae/barakah-plant/
- Commons: Related media on Commons

The Barakah nuclear power plant (Arabic: محطة براكة للطاقة النووية) (BNPP) is a nuclear power station in the United Arab Emirates (UAE). The site is in the Al Dhafra region of the Emirate of Abu Dhabi, approximately 53 km west-southwest of Al Dhannah City, on the coastline between the Persian Gulf and the E11 highway. It consists of four APR-1400 nuclear reactors. Its total nameplate capacity is 5600 MW which is intended to supply up to 25% of UAE's electricity needs. It is the first nuclear power station in the UAE, and the first commercial nuclear power station in the Arab World.

A drone strike against the nuclear facility caused a fire at the perimeter on May 17, 2026. The Ministry of Defense later reported the drone originated in Iraqi territory.

== History ==
=== Contracting ===
In December 2009, Emirates Nuclear Energy Corporation (ENEC) awarded a coalition led by Korea Electric Power Corporation (KEPCO) a $20 billion bid to build the first nuclear power plant in the UAE. Barakah was chosen as the site to build four APR-1400 nuclear reactors successively, with the first scheduled to start supplying electricity in 2017.

In 2011, Bloomberg reported that following detailed finance agreements, the build cost was put at $30 billion and financed with $10 billion equity, $10 billion export-credit agency debt, and $10 billion from bank and sovereign debt. South Korea may earn a further $20 billion from operation, maintenance and fuel supply contracts. A later Bloomberg report indicates the price as $25 billion.

As of 22 March 2018, the project's total cost was refined to $24.4 billion to complete. However, by April 9, 2020, Power Technology reported that the project cost was $32 billion. Startup of Unit 1 was delayed to late 2018. The project was then further delayed, with commercial operation of the first reactor only achieved in April 2021.

=== Timeline ===
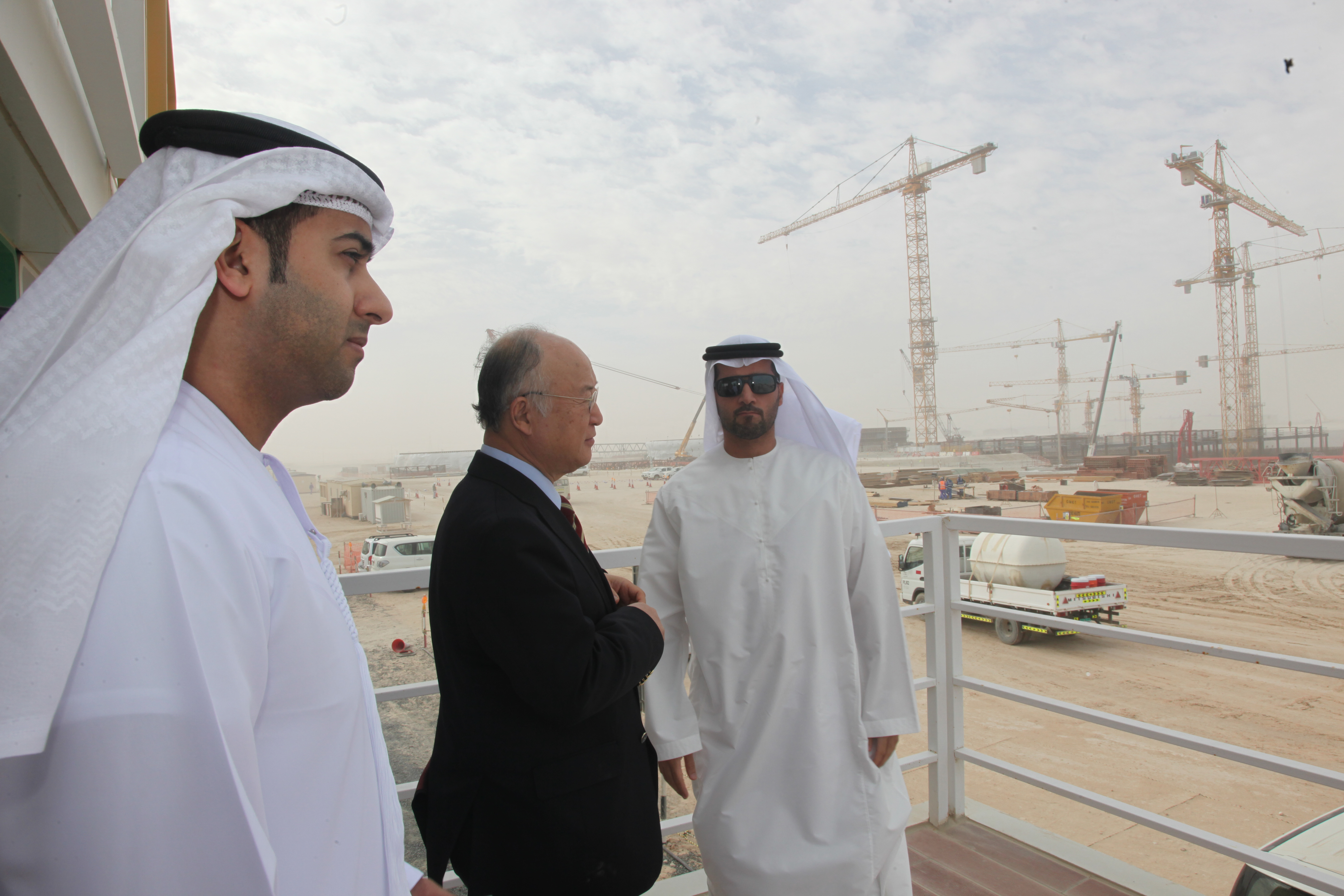
Director General of the International Atomic Energy Agency (IAEA) Yukiya Amano visiting Barakah in 2013

The plant's ground-breaking ceremony was held on 14 March 2011, including Korean President Lee Myung-bak. It has four units. Construction of the first unit was begun in the afternoon of 18 July 2012, ahead of its scheduled date in late 2012. This happened despite delays being mooted in the wake of the Fukushima Daiichi nuclear disaster. In May 2013, construction started on the second unit, which was then expected to take five years. The first safety-related concrete was poured for Unit 3 in September 2014. Unit 4 started construction in September 2015.

In 2014, the Barakah 1 reactor vessel was delivered onsite and site preparation works for Barakah 3 and 4 started. Meanwhile, the concrete-and-steel reactor containment building for Barakah 1 was completed in January 2015.

In March 2015, ENEC applied to Federal Authority for Nuclear Regulation (FANR) for operating licences for Units 1 and 2.

In September 2015, first concrete was poured for Unit 4. More than 18,000 staff were then working on the construction of all 4 units.

In December 2017, the rebel Houthis group claimed to have fired a cruise missile in the direction of the Barakah plant, but the Emirati authorities said that no missiles had actually reached the UAE.

In December 2018, it was reported that voids were found in the concrete containment buildings for units 2 & 3. Grease was found to have leaked through the unit 3 containment, which may have been due to a crack in the concrete.

Unit 1 was declared complete in 2018. However it was not expected to begin operations until late 2019 or early 2020. In January 2020 it was announced that fuel loading would commence that quarter, about 2.5 years later than the original planned date of August 2017. FANR had raised 400 adverse findings in a review requiring rectification of various technical, organisational and management issues.

In March 2020, ENEC announced the completion of the fuel assemblies loading into the Unit 1 reactor. The reactor started generating electricity in August 2020 and entered commercial operation in 2021.

Unit	Type	Construction start	Commercial operation	Construction time (years)	Notes
Barakah 1	APR-1400	19 July 2012	1 April 2021	9	
Barakah 2	APR-1400	16 April 2013	24 March 2022	9	
Barakah 3	APR-1400	24 September 2014	24 February 2023	9	
Barakah 4	APR-1400	30 July 2015	5 September 2024	9	

=== Completion ===
- Unit 1 was 100% complete as of December 2018. It entered commercial service in April 2021.
- Unit 2 was 100% complete as of April 2021. It entered commercial service in March 2022.
- Unit 3 was 100% complete as of November 2021. It entered commercial service in February 2023.
- Unit 4 was 100% complete as of July 2022. It started electricity generation in March 2024 and entered commercial service in September 2024.

=== Cooperation ===
On September 9, 2024, the United Arab Emirates and India signed a Memorandum of Understanding (MoU) involving BNPP for civil nuclear cooperation between ENEC and Nuclear Power Corporation of India Limited.

== 2026 drone strikes ==
On 17 May 2026, the area near the Baraka nuclear power plant was struck by an Unmanned Aerial Vehicle (UAV) originating from Iraq, causing a fire in an electrical generator outside the plant's inner perimeter requiring emergency diesel generators to provide power to unit 3. No injuries were reported, and no radioactive material was released. Anwar Gargash, an Emirati presidential adviser, explicitly blamed Iran or its regional proxies for the attack.

Warning of an "untold and unprecedented humanitarian and environmental crisis," US Ambassador Mike Waltz stated the world should be thankful the strike did not trigger a catastrophic nuclear meltdown. Speaking to the Security Council, Waltz accused Tehran of trying to "weaponize" a civilian nuclear power plant after failing to develop nuclear weapons, branding Iran's actions as both "outrageous and unacceptable."

== Criticism ==
In March 2019, Qatar lodged a letter of complaint to the IAEA regarding the Barakah nuclear power plant, stating concerns about its safety and lack of co-operation with regional states on the project as well as that it poses a serious threat to regional stability and the environment. The UAE denied that there are safety issues with the plant stating that Barakah adheres to the highest standards of nuclear safety and security.

== See also ==
- List of commercial nuclear reactors § United Arab Emirates
- Energy in the United Arab Emirates
- Nuclear power in the United Arab Emirates
