= Yeongdeok-eup =

Yeongdeok
- Town
- Panoramic view of Yeongdeok-eup

- Country: South Korea
- Province: North Gyeongsang
- County: Yeongdeok County
- Administrative divisions: 17 beopjeongni, 27 hangjeongni and 179 ban

Area
  - Total: 66.072 km^{2} (25.511 sq mi)

Population (2011.12)
  - Total: 11,145
  - Density: 168.68/km^{2} (436.88/sq mi)
- Website: Yeongdeok Town

Korean name
- Hangul: 영덕읍
- Hanja: 盈德邑
- RR: Yeongdeok-eup
- MR: Yŏngdŏk-ŭp

Yeongdeok-eup (Korean: 영덕읍) is a town, or eup in Yeongdeok County, North Gyeongsang Province, South Korea. The township Yeongdeok-myeon was upgraded to the town Yeongdeok-eup in 1979. Yeongdeok County Office is located in Namseok-ri and Yeongdeok Town Office is in Ugok-ri, which are crowded with people.

== Communities ==
Yeongdeok-eup is divided into 17 villages (ri).

	Hangul	Hanja
Gumi-ri	구미리	九美里
Hwagae-ri	화개리	華開里
Namseok-ri	남석리	南石里
Deokgok-ri	덕곡리	德谷里
Cheonjeon-ri	천전리	川前里
Namsan-ri	남산리	南山里
Ugok-ri	우곡리	右谷里
Hwasu-ri	화수리	華水里
Samgye-ri	삼계리	三溪里
Maejeong-ri	매정리	梅亭里
Seok-ri	석리	石里
Nomul-ri	노물리	老勿里
Obo-ri	오보리	烏保里
Daetan-ri	대탄리	大灘里
Daebu-ri	대부리	大夫里
Changpo-ri	창포리	菖浦里
Hwacheon-ri	화천리	華川里
