= Yeongdeok County =

Coordinates: 36°24′36″N 129°22′30″E

Yeongdeok
- County
- Gangguhang Port in Ganggu-myeon

- Flag Logo

- Location in South Korea
- Country: South Korea
- Region: Yeongnam
- Administrative divisions: 1 eup, 8 myeon

Area
  - Total: 741.05 km^{2} (286.12 sq mi)

Population (September 2024)
  - Total: 33,356
  - Density: 71.1/km^{2} (184/sq mi)
  - Dialect: Gyeongsang

Korean name
- Hangul: 영덕군
- Hanja: 盈德郡
- RR: Yeongdeok-gun
- MR: Yŏngdŏk-kun

Yeongdeok County (Korean: 영덕군) is a county in North Gyeongsang Province, South Korea. It is well known for snow crabs.

== Administrative divisions ==
Map of Yeongdeok County

Yeongdeok County is divided into 1 eup and 8 myeon.

Name	Hangeul	Hanja
Yeongdeok-eup	영덕읍	盈德邑
Changsu-myeon	창수면	蒼水面
Byeonggok-myeon	병곡면	柄谷面
Yeonghae-myeon	영해면	寧海面
Chuksan-myeon	축산면	丑山面
Jipum-myeon	지품면	知品面
Ganggu-myeon	강구면	江口面
Dalsan-myeon	달산면	達山面
Namjeong-myeon	남정면	南亭面

== Festival ==
Yeongdeok-eup hosts a snow crab festival every year. The festival offers various events including snow crab fishing for children, family team games, a snow crab auction, and Madangguk (a type of traditional Korean performance). The Youngdeok King Festival, which marks its twenty-first year in 2018, is held in the Gaejang Port and offers a variety of attractions and experiences to tourists through its colorful events.

== Climate ==
Yeongdeok has a cooler version of a humid subtropical climate (Köppen: Cfa).

Climate data for Yeongdeok (1991–2020 normals, extremes 1972–present)
Month	Jan	Feb	Mar	Apr	May	Jun	Jul	Aug	Sep	Oct	Nov	Dec	Year
Record high °C (°F)	17.0 (62.6)	24.1 (75.4)	27.0 (80.6)	34.0 (93.2)	35.8 (96.4)	37.0 (98.6)	38.1 (100.6)	39.9 (103.8)	35.3 (95.5)	30.1 (86.2)	26.9 (80.4)	20.9 (69.6)	39.9 (103.8)
Mean daily maximum °C (°F)	5.8 (42.4)	8.1 (46.6)	12.5 (54.5)	18.4 (65.1)	22.9 (73.2)	25.6 (78.1)	28.6 (83.5)	29.1 (84.4)	25.0 (77.0)	20.7 (69.3)	14.6 (58.3)	8.0 (46.4)	18.3 (64.9)
Daily mean °C (°F)	1.0 (33.8)	2.9 (37.2)	7.0 (44.6)	12.5 (54.5)	17.1 (62.8)	20.4 (68.7)	24.1 (75.4)	24.5 (76.1)	20.1 (68.2)	15.0 (59.0)	9.2 (48.6)	3.1 (37.6)	13.1 (55.6)
Mean daily minimum °C (°F)	−3.1 (26.4)	−1.8 (28.8)	1.7 (35.1)	6.7 (44.1)	11.6 (52.9)	16.0 (60.8)	20.5 (68.9)	21.1 (70.0)	16.0 (60.8)	10.1 (50.2)	4.2 (39.6)	−1.2 (29.8)	8.5 (47.3)
Record low °C (°F)	−15.1 (4.8)	−13.7 (7.3)	−9.9 (14.2)	−3.6 (25.5)	1.5 (34.7)	6.0 (42.8)	11.1 (52.0)	12.8 (55.0)	6.4 (43.5)	−1.4 (29.5)	−7.2 (19.0)	−13.8 (7.2)	−15.1 (4.8)
Average precipitation mm (inches)	37.4 (1.47)	30.5 (1.20)	49.1 (1.93)	79.5 (3.13)	74.5 (2.93)	113.4 (4.46)	194.3 (7.65)	213.6 (8.41)	159.6 (6.28)	86.2 (3.39)	49.8 (1.96)	24.3 (0.96)	1,112.2 (43.79)
Average precipitation days (≥ 0.1 mm)	4.9	4.9	7.1	7.0	7.4	8.9	12.2	12.6	9.8	5.8	6.0	3.8	90.4
Average snowy days	2.3	2.6	1.3	0.1	0.0	0.0	0.0	0.0	0.0	0.0	0.3	1.2	7.8
Average relative humidity (%)	51.8	54.0	58.3	59.3	64.3	73.9	78.7	79.9	78.0	68.9	59.9	51.5	64.9
Mean monthly sunshine hours	195.3	187.5	210.7	228.3	243.6	201.4	178.2	188.8	178.7	198.5	181.1	190.3	2,382.4
Percentage possible sunshine	67.2	63.8	58.7	61.5	58.2	49.2	43.6	50.0	51.6	62.3	63.5	67.8	57.3
Source: Korea Meteorological Administration (snow and percent sunshine 1981–2010)
