= Korea Hydro & Nuclear Power =

Energy company in South Korea

Korea Hydro & Nuclear Power Co., Ltd.

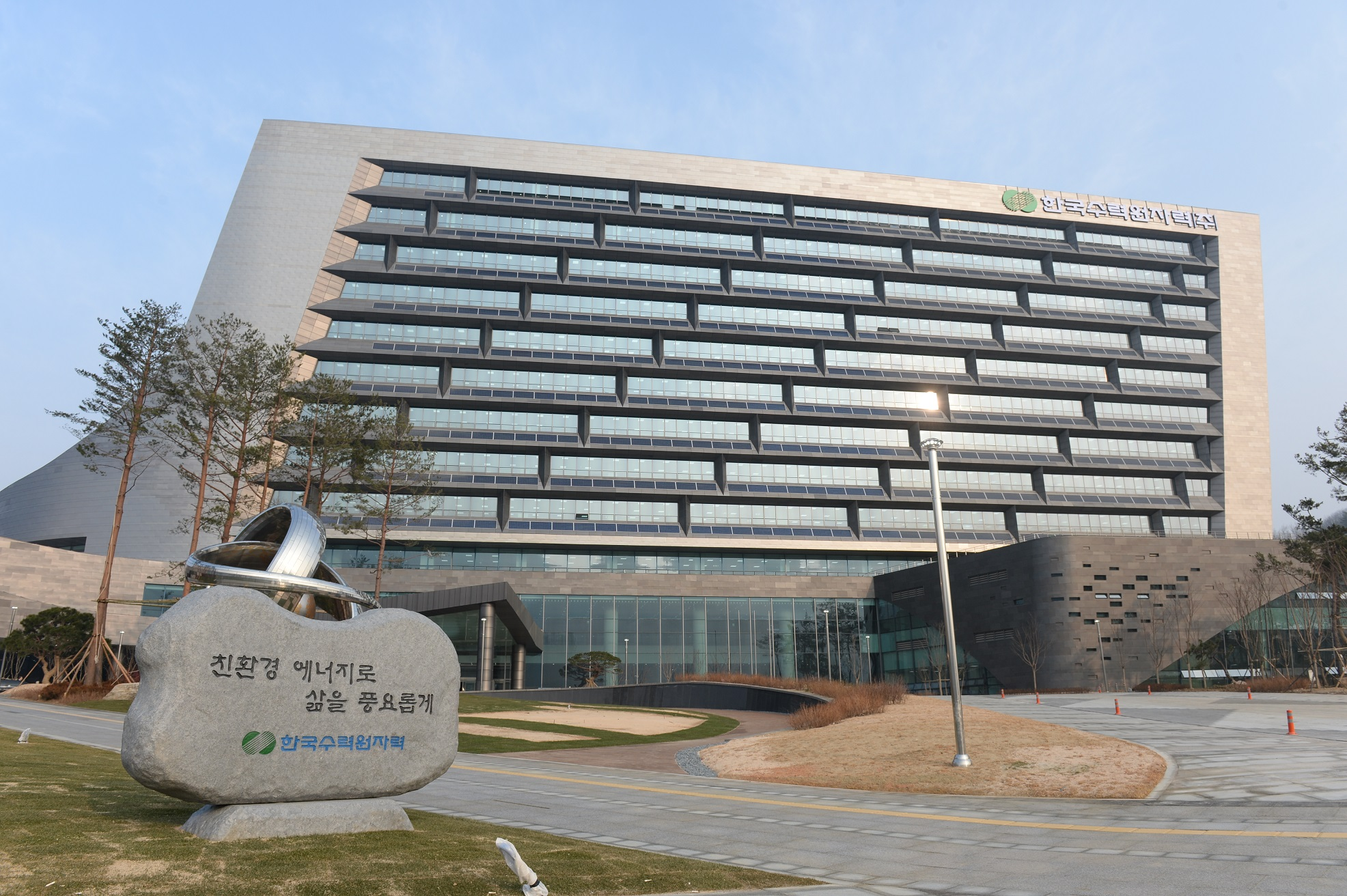
- Headquarters in Gyeongju
- Native name: 한국수력원자력 주식회사
- Industry: Electricity generation; Nuclear power; Hydroelectricity
- Founded: 2001; 25 years ago
- Founder: Korea Electric Power Corporation
- Headquarters: Gyeongju, North Gyeongsang, South Korea
- Key people: Whang Joo-ho (President and CEO)
- Products: Electricity
- Revenue: ₩10.4 trillion
- Net income: ₩0.6 trillion
- Total assets: ₩62 trillion
- Total equity: ₩26 trillion
- Number of employees: 12,551 (2020)
- Parent: KEPCO
- Website: www.khnp.co.kr

Korea Hydro & Nuclear Power (KHNP; Korean: 한국수력원자력) is a subsidiary of the Korea Electric Power Corporation (KEPCO). It operates large nuclear and hydroelectric plants in South Korea, which are responsible for about 31.56 percent of the country's electric power.

In December 2020, KHNP operated 24 nuclear power plants, 37 hydroelectric plants, 16 pumped-storage power plants, and 32 renewable power plants. Its total facility capacity was 28,607 MW, with a total generation capacity of 164,613 GWh.

== History ==
KHNP was established in 2001 as part of a general restructuring at KEPCO, which opened its first nuclear plant at Kori in Busan in 1977. Commercial operation at Kori nuclear #1 began in 1978.

== Timeline ==
Before separation from KEPCO:

- 1978: Commercial operation of Kori 1 began.
- 1983: Commercial operation of Wolsong 1 and Kori 2 began.
- 1985: Commercial operation of Kori 3 began.
- 1986: Commercial operation of Kori 4 and Hanbit 1 began.
- 1987: Commercial operation of Hanbit 2 began.
- 1988: Commercial operation of Hanul 1 began.
- 1989: Commercial operation of Hanul 2 began.
- 1995: Commercial operation of Hanbit 3 began.
- 1996: Commercial operation of Hanbit 4 began.
- 1997: Commercial operation of Wolsong 2 began.
- 1998: Commercial operation of Wolsong 3 and Hanul 3 (Korea’s first nuclear power plant) began.
- 1999: Commercial operation of Hanul 4 and Wolsong 4 began.
- 2001: KHNP began.

After separation from KEPCO:

- 2002: Commercial operation of Hanbit 5 and 6; APR-1400 reactor was developed.
- 2005: Completion of Hanul 5 and 6 and the renewable-energy Kori Wind Power Plant and Yeonggwang Solar Park
- 2007: Continued operation of Kori 1 approved.
- 2010: Shin-Kori 3 reactor (first APR-1400 application) installed.
- 2011: Commercial operation of Shin-Kori 1 reactor (first OPR1000 application) began.
- 2012: Commercial operation of Shin-Kori 2 and Shin-Wolsong 1 began.
- 2013: First Korean-technology safety analysis of a heavy water reactor licensed.
- 2014: Korean APR+ nuclear power plant stand design approved.
- 2015: Continued operation of Wolsong 1 approved; commercial operation of Shin-Wolsong 2 began.
- 2016: Head office moved to Gyeongju; commercial operation of Shin-Kori 3 (first APR-1400 application) began.
- 2017: Completed Noeul Fuel Cell and Kori Photovoltaic Power Plant; retired Kori 1.
- 2018: Chameliya Khola Hydropower Station in Nepal completed.
- 2019: Photovoltaic power station at the Samnangjin Pumped-Storage Power Plant completed; commercial operation of Shin-kori 4 began.

== Operations ==
The company operates internationally, with offices in New York, Washington, Paris, Tokyo and Prague. The current CEO is Chung Jaehoon (Korean: 정재훈). In 2020, the company had 12,551 employees and revenue of ₩10.4 trillion (about US$9 billion). Its international credit ratings are Aa2 stable/AA stable/AA- stable (Moody's/S&P/Fitch). The chief executive officer is Whang Joo-ho, who began his three-year term in 2022.

== Power plants ==
Nuclear sites:

- Kori site in Jangan-eup, Gijang-gun, Busan
- Hanul site (formerly Ulchin) in Buk-myeon, Uljin-gun, Gyeongsangbuk-do
- Wolseong site in Yangnam-myeon, Gyeongju, Gyeongsangbuk-do.
- Hanbit site (formerly Yonggwang) in Hongnong-eup, Yeonggwang County, Jeollanam-do

Hydroelectric sites:

- Hwacheon Dam in Gandong-myeon, Hwacheon County, Gangwon-do
- Paldang site in Joan-myeon, Namyangju, Gyeonggi-do
- Cheongpyong site in Oeseo-myeon, Gapyeong County, Gyeonggi-do
- Uiam Dam in Sindong-myeon, Chuncheon, Gangwon-do
- Chuncheon site in Sinbuk-eup, Chuncheon, Gangwon-do
- Boseonggang site in Deungnyang-myeon, Boseong County, Jeollanam-do
- Seomjingang site in Chilbo-myeon, Jeongeup, Jeollabuk-do
- Goesan site in Chilseong-myeon, Goesan County, Chungcheongbuk-do
- Gangneung site, Seongsan-myeon, Gangneung, Gangwon-do

Renewable-energy sites:

- Hanbit Solar Park 1, 2 (3 MW), at the Hanbit site
- Kori Wind Power (0.75 MW), at the Kori site
- Hanbit Solar Park 3 (11 MW), at the Hanbit site
- Yecheon Solar Power Plant (2 MW), in the Yecheon pumped-storage power plant
- Kori Solar Power Plant (5 MW), at the Kori site
- KHNP's Farming Solar Power Plant (73 kW), at the Cheongpyeong Hydropower Station
- Gyeonggi Fuel Cell Power Plant (58.8 MW), Gveonggi-do, Hwaseong-si
- Noeul Fuel Cell Power Plant (20 MW), in World Cup Park, Sangam-dong, Mapo-gu, Seoul
- Busan Fuel Cell Power Plant (30.8 MW), in a group cogeneration complex in Haeundae-gu, Busan

=== Barakah nuclear power plant ===
On December 27, 2009, Emirates Nuclear Energy Corporation (ENEC) and KEPCO agreed to build four 1400 MWe Korean (APR-1400) nuclear power units in Barakah, United Arab Emirates. KEPCO carried out the project in partnership with KHNP, KEPCO E&C, KEPCO NF, Hyundai E&C, and Samsung C&T. In accordance with its joint project management agreement with KEPCO, KHNP provided manpower and technical support for construction management, in addition to training and licensing support.

KHNP sent skilled nuclear-power-plant operating personnel and provided services requested by ENEC under an operating support services agreement until the agreement ended on July 20, 2016. KHNP will continue to assign an average of 200 operators and engineers to the BNPP annually and provide requested services for 10 years after the completion of BNPP Unit 4. A consortium of KHNP and Korea Electric Power Corporation Plant Service & Engineering Co. (KEPCO KPS) signed a five-year maintenance contract for the BNPP in June 2019.

== Diversification ==
KHNP plans to expand its new and renewable energy production capacity to 7.6 GW by 2030. The company is installing the world’s largest floating photovoltaic power-generation facility (300MW) on the Saemangeum Seawall in North Jeolla Province. With the city of Ulsan and Hyundai Motor Company, it installed a 6 MW photovoltaic power-generation facility. In 2019, KHNP completed a 19.2 MW onshore wind-power-generation complex in 2019, powering about 16,000 households at the foot of Noraesan mountain near its pumped-storage plant in Cheonsong, Syeongsangbuk-do Province.

=== New markets ===
In Romania, KHNP implementing a technical-service project for a radioactive waste repository. The company also strengthened cooperation with nuclear power plant operators in the Czech Republic, Poland, Kazakhstan, and Bulgaria.

In 2025, KHNP announced it was withdrawing from the bid process for two new reactors at the Borssele Nuclear Power Station in the Netherlands. It had recently withdrawn from similar reactor selection processes in Sweden and Slovenia.

=== Overseas renewable energy ===
In September 2020, KHNP announced that it had joined a consortium with several South Korean financial institutions. The consortium agreed to acquire 49.9 percent of four large wind farms in the United States.

That year, the company joined Korea Overseas Infrastructure & Urban Development Corp (KIND), S Energy, and Hanyang Electric at the World Trade Center Seoul in a consortium to invest in a solar-power project in Chile. The consortium is promoting a 6.6MW plant in Guadalupe and a 6.4MW plant in María Pinto, both near Santiago, the capital of Chile. KHNP intended to complete construction in 2021 and operate the two plants for 25 years.

=== US reactor ===
The US Nuclear Regulatory Commission (NRC) certified KEPCO's APR-1400 in 2019, saying that the NRC found the design fully meeting US safety requirements. According to KEPCO, the APR-1400 was the first "non-US type" reactor design certified by the NRC. In October 2017, European Utility Requirements (an advisory group for European utilities) had approved the APR-1400 reactor design.

=== Winning a tender in the Czech Republic ===
On 17 July 2024, KHNP won the tender for the construction of two new units at Dukovany Nuclear Power Station in Czech Republic and will also negotiate an option for the construction of two more units at Temelín. Price for one unit at Dukovany to be about CZK 200 billion.

Later it was announced that Westinghouse, KHNP and Korea Electric Power Cooperation had reached agreement on reactor intellectual property issues, which had gone to court in the US. Under the terms of the agreement KHNP must not bid for nuclear projects in the European Union (except Czech Republic), North America and Japan. For other projects KHNP must purchase goods and services from Westinghouse worth $650 million per reactor, and pay $175 million of royalties.

== See also ==
- Economy of South Korea and Energy in South Korea
- Environment of South Korea
- List of public utilities
- Gyeongju Korea Hydro & Nuclear Power FC
- Nuclear power in South Korea
