= KEPCO E&C =

South Korean company

- Type: Public
- Industry: Engineering
- Founded: 1975; 51 years ago
- Headquarters: Gimcheon, North Gyeongsang, South Korea
- Key people: Kim Tae-Kyun (CEO)
- Products: Nuclear and thermal power plants
- Services: Designing, engineering, and constructing of power plants
- Number of employees: 2,315(2025)
- Parent: Korea Electric Power Corporation
- Website: www.kepco-enc.com/eng/index.do

KEPCO E&C (full name: KEPCO Engineering & Construction Company, INC., formerly: KOPEC) is a power plant design and engineering company in South Korea. It was established in 1975 as a public enterprise. KEPCO E&C engages in designing, engineering, and constructing nuclear and fossil power plants. The company operates as a subsidiary of Korea Electric Power Corporation (KEPCO).

KEPCO E&C is providing total integrated Engineering, procurement and construction (EPC) services. It has designed and built a total of 14 nuclear power plants using their own technology, including the development of APR-1400 next-generation nuclear power plant. The company has also designed and built over 40 coal power plants and combined cycle & cogeneration plants. In 2006, KEPCO E&C won the 'Be award', Plant:Multidiscipline Engineering, for the Shin-Kori Nuclear Power Plant in Korea.

KEPCO E&C became the world's first business to develop the low-temperature DeNOx catalyst.

In January 2024, KEPCO signed a MOU with Lloyd’s Register, Zodiac Maritime, and KSOE to design and build nuclear powered bulk carriers and container ships.

== See also ==
- Korea Electric Power Corporation (KEPCO)
- Korea Hydro & Nuclear Power (KHNP)
