= Kori Nuclear Power Plant =

Nuclear power plant in South Korea

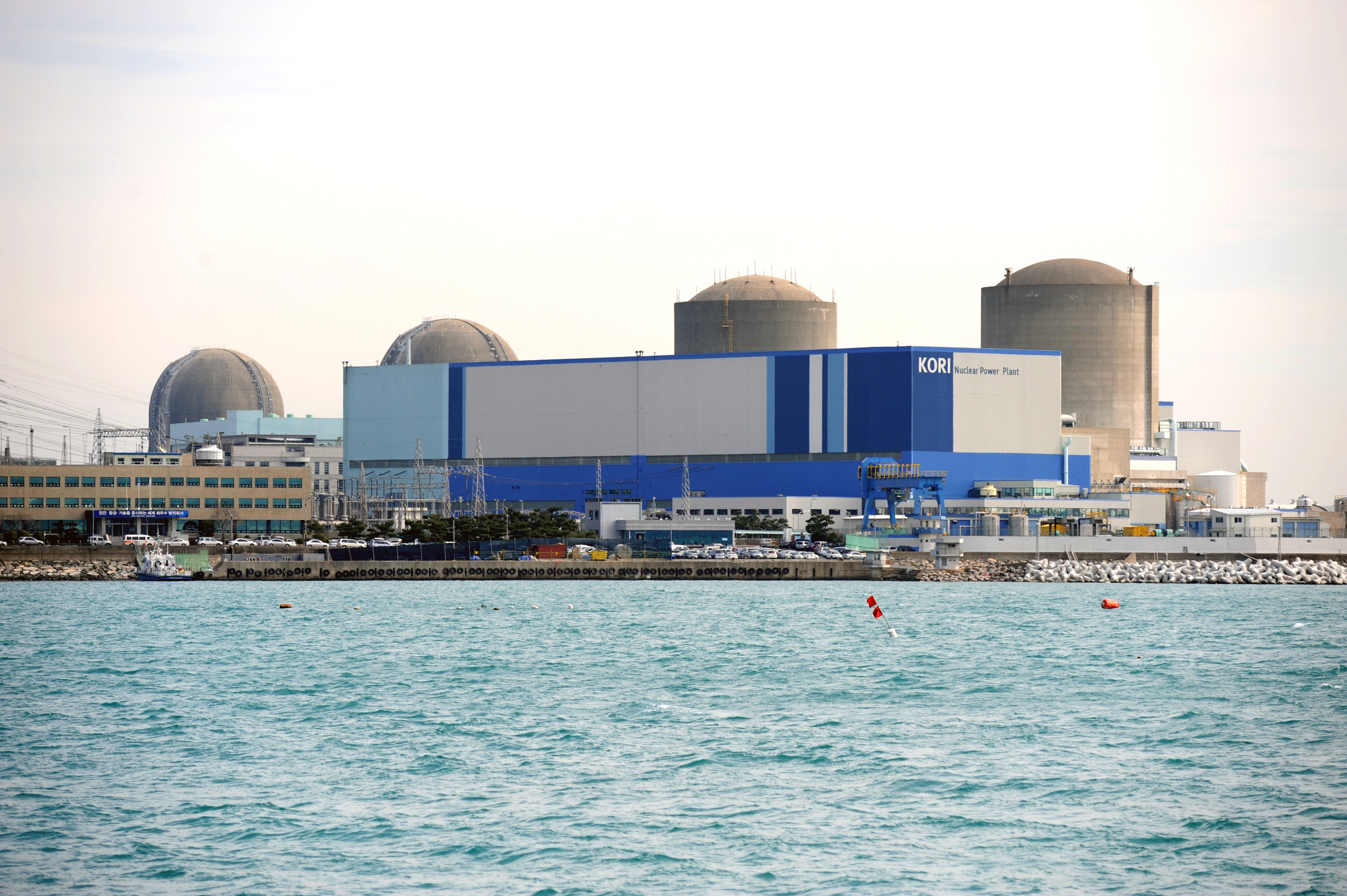
- Kori Nuclear Power Plant, Reactors Kori 1, Kori 2, Kori 3, Kori 4 from right to left.
- Official name: 고리원자력발전소 (kori)
- Country: South Korea
- Location: Gori, Busan
- Coordinates: 35.319904°N 129.290053°E
- Status: Operational
- Construction began: Unit 1: 1 August 1972; Unit 2: 23 December 1977; Unit 3: 1 October 1979; Unit 4: 1 April 1980; Unit 5: 16 June 2006; Unit 6: 5 June 2007; Unit 7: 16 October 2008; Unit 8: 19 August 2009
- Commission date: Unit 1: 29 April 1978; Unit 2: 25 July 1983; Unit 3: 30 September 1985; Unit 4: 29 April 1986; Unit 5: 28 February 2011; Unit 6: 20 July 2012; Unit 7: 20 December 2016; Unit 8: 29 August 2019
- Decommission date: Unit 1: 18 June 2017
- Owner: Korea Hydro & Nuclear Power
- Operator: Korea Hydro & Nuclear Power

Nuclear power station
- Reactor type: PWR
- Reactor supplier: Westinghouse; KEPCO E&C
- Cooling source: Sea of Japan
- Thermal capacity: 1 × 1882 MW_{th} 2 × 2912 MW_{th} 2 × 2825 MW_{th} 2 × 3983 MW_{th}

Power generation
- Units operational: 1 × 640 MW; 1 × 1011 MW; 1 × 1012 MW; 2 × 996 MW; 1 × 1416 MW; 1 × 1418 MW
- Make and model: 3 × WH-F; 2 × OPR-1000; 2 × APR-1400
- Units under const.: 2 × 1340 MW APR-1400
- Units decommissioned: 1 × 576 MW WH-60
- Nameplate capacity: 7489 MW (net)
- Capacity factor: 74.45% (includes Units 1 & 7)
- Annual net output: 43,148 GW·h (2016) (includes Units 1 & 7)

External links
- Website: www.khnp.co.kr/eng/kori/main.office
- Commons: Related media on Commons

The Kori Nuclear Power Plant (Korean: 고리원자력발전소, Hanja: 古里原子力發電所) is a South Korean nuclear power plant located in Kori, a suburban village in Busan. It is the world's second-largest fully operational nuclear generating station by total reactor count and the number of currently operational reactors since 2016, after it exceeded in nameplate capacity Canada's Bruce Nuclear Generating Station. It is owned and operated by Korea Hydro & Nuclear Power, a subsidiary of KEPCO. The first reactor began commercial operation in 1978 and operated until 2017 when it was decommissioned. Units 2, 3, and 4 started commercial operations in the 1980s. All reactors on site are pressurized water reactors.

== Reactors ==
An expansion of the plant begun in 2006 added four new Korean-sourced reactors, the so-called Shin Kori reactors (Korean: 신고리; shin 신 meaning "new"). The first pair of Shin Kori reactors are of the OPR-1000 design, while the second two are of the APR-1400 design. Shin Kori 1 and 2 achieved commercial operations in 2011 and 2012, respectively, with Saeul-1 and 2 (then named Shin Kori 3 and 4) achieving commercial operations in 2016 and 2019. Construction on two further APR-1400 reactors, known as Saeul-3 and 4 (originally named Shin Kori-5 and Shin Kori-6), was started in April 2017 and September 2018, respectively.

In November 2019, the reactor pressure vessel of the 1340MWe APR-1400 reactor to be housed in Saeul-3 (Shin Kori 5) was installed. As of November 2019, construction on Saeul-3 and 4 was 51 percent complete.

Kori Nuclear Power Plant became the largest operating nuclear power plant in the world by nameplate capacity after the commissioning of Saeul-2 (Shin Kori 4). Only the Japanese Kashiwazaki-Kariwa Nuclear Power Plant has a larger nameplate capacity, though it had been idled between the 2011 Fukushima Daiichi nuclear disaster and 2026, and has only operated at reduced capacity since.

Saeul 3 was approved for operation in December 2025. Shin Kori unit 3-6 is renamed Saeul 1-4.

Kori 2 was restarted in April 2026 after a three year suspension for safety checks and facility improvements due to its 40-year permit expiring in April 2023.

Name	Capacity (net)	Design	Construction start	First criticality	Commercial start	Permanent Shutdown	NSSS	Turbine generator	A-E	Construction
Phase I
Kori-1	576 MW	WH-60	1972-08-01	1977-06-19	1978-04-29	2017-06-18	Westinghouse	GEC Turbines (Rugby)	Gilbert	Westinghouse
Kori-2	640 MW	WH-F	1977-12-23	1983-04-09	1983-07-25	April 2033 (license expiration)	Westinghouse	GEC Turbines (Rugby)	Gilbert	Westinghouse
Kori-3	1011 MW	WH-F	1979-01-01	1985-01-01	1985-09-30		Westinghouse	GEC Turbines (Rugby)	Bechtel	Hyundai
Kori-4	1012 MW	WH-F	1980-04-01	1985-10-26	1986-04-29		Westinghouse	GEC Turbines (Rugby)	Bechtel	Hyundai
Phase II
Shin Kori-1	996 MW	OPR-1000	2006-06-16	2010-07-15	2011-02-28		KHNP/KEPCO	Doosan	KOPEC	Hyundai
Shin Kori-2	996 MW	OPR-1000	2007-06-05	2011-12-27	2012-07-20		KHNP/KEPCO	Doosan	KOPEC	Hyundai
Saeul-1	1416 MW	APR-1400	2008-10-16	2015-12-29	2016-12-20		KHNP/KEPCO	Doosan	KOPEC	Hyundai
Saeul-2	1418 MW	APR-1400	2009-08-19	2019-04-08	2019-08-29		KHNP/KEPCO	Doosan	KOPEC	Hyundai
Saeul-3	1340 MW	APR-1400	2017-04-01	2026-04-12			Unknown	Unknown	Unknown	Unknown
Saeul-4	1340 MW	APR-1400	2018-09-20				Unknown	Unknown	Unknown	Unknown

Kori-1 was shut down in June 2017 in advance of decommissioning beginning in 2022 after its spent nuclear fuel is removed. Decommissioning will take 15 years to complete and will cost an estimated KRW719.4 billion (US$639.5 million).

== Incidents ==
=== Minor incidents ===
On 9 February 2012, during a refueling outage, a loss of off-site power (LOOP) occurred, and emergency diesel generator (EDG) 'B' failed to start while EDG 'A' was out of service for scheduled maintenance, resulting in a station blackout (SBO). Off-site power was restored 12 minutes after the SBO condition began.

The LOOP was caused by a human error during a protective relay test of the main generator. The EDG 'B' failing to start was caused by the failure of the EDG air start system. Further investigation revealed that the utility did not exercise proper control of electrical distribution configuration to ensure the availability of the Station Auxiliary Transformer (SAT) while conducting a test on the Unit Auxiliary Transformer (UAT).

After restoring off-site power through the SAT, the operators eventually recovered shutdown cooling by restoring power to a residual heat removal pump. During the loss of shutdown cooling for 19 minutes, the reactor coolant maximum temperature in the hot leg increased from 37°C to 58.3°C (approximately 21.3°C rise), and the spent fuel pool temperature slightly increased from 21°C to 21.5°C. There was no adverse effect on the plant safety as a result of this event, no radiation exposure to the workers, and no release of radioactive materials to the environment. However, inconsistent with the requirements, the licensee did not report the SBO event to the regulatory body in a timely manner and did not declare the "alert" status of the event in accordance with the plant emergency plan. The licensee reported this event to the regulatory body about a month after the event had occurred.

On 2 October 2012 at 8:10 a.m., Shin Kori-1 was shut down after a warning signal indicated a malfunction in the control rod system, which triggered an investigation to verify the exact cause of the problem.

In June 2013, Kori-2 was shut down, and Kori-1 was ordered to remain offline until safety-related control cabling with forged safety certificates is replaced. Control cabling installed in the APR-1400s under construction failed flame and other tests, eventually requiring a replacement, which delayed construction by up to a year.

In October 2013, the cable installed in Saeul-1 (Shin Kori-3) failed safety tests, including flame tests. Replacement with U.S.-manufactured cable delayed the startup of the plant, which eventually entered commercial operation 3 years late.

== See also ==
- Nuclear power in South Korea
- List of commercial nuclear reactors in South Korea
