= Hanul Nuclear Power Plant =

Nuclear power station in South Korea

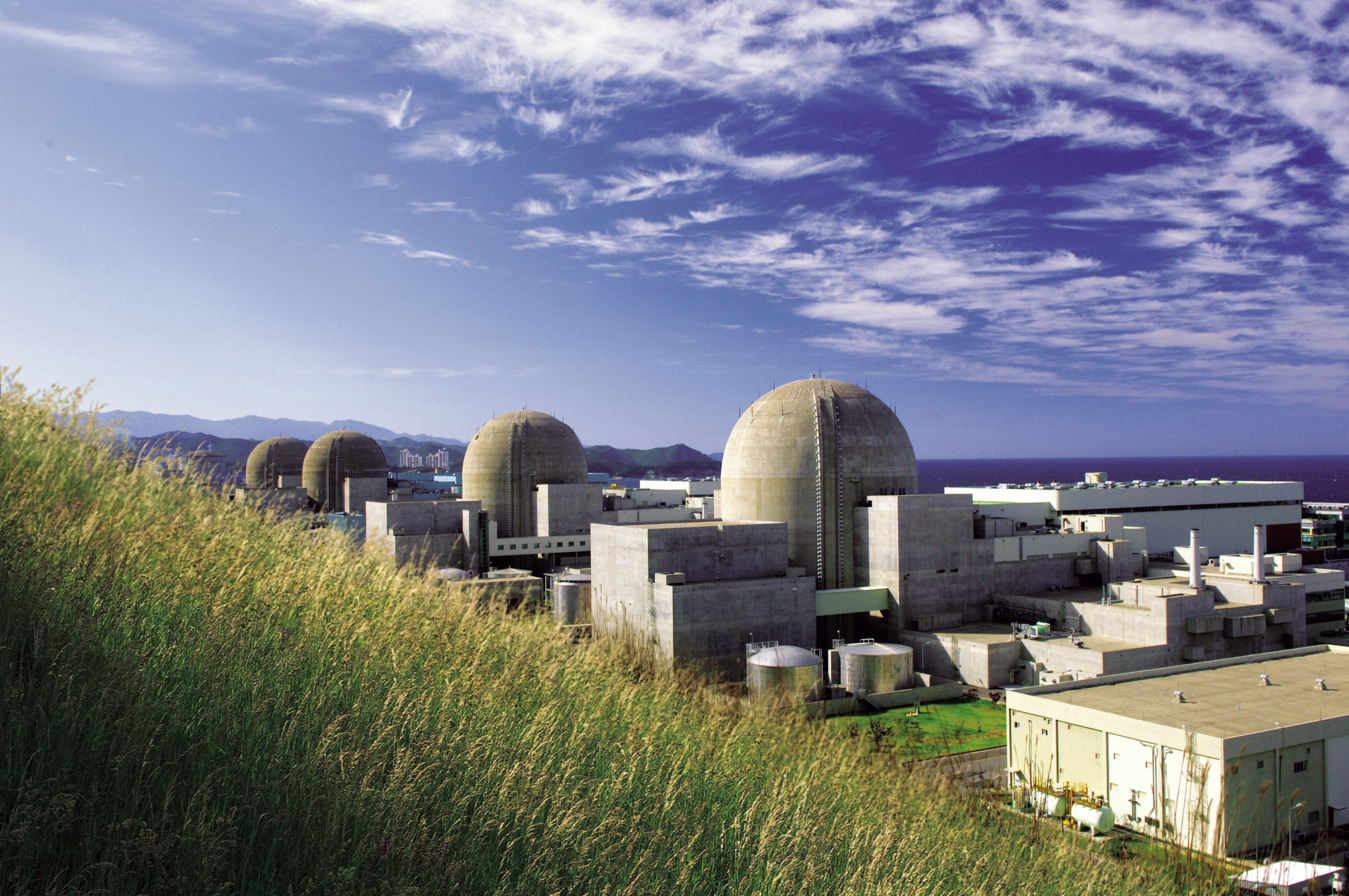
- Hanul (formerly Uljin) Nuclear Power Plant
- Official name: 한울원자력발전소
- Country: South Korea
- Location: North Gyeongsang Province
- Coordinates: 37°05′34″N 129°23′01″E
- Status: Operational
- Construction began: Unit 1: 26 January 1983; Unit 2: 5 July 1983; Unit 3: 21 July 1993; Unit 4: 1 November 1993; Unit 5: 1 October 1999; Unit 6: 29 September 2000; Unit 7: 10 July 2012; Unit 8: 19 June 2013; Unit 9: 30 October 2024; Unit 10: 30 October 2024
- Commission date: Unit 1: 10 September 1988; Unit 2: 30 September 1989; Unit 3: 11 August 1998; Unit 4: 31 December 1999; Unit 5: 29 July 2004; Unit 6: 22 April 2005; Unit 7: 9 June 2022; Unit 8: 21 December 2023
- Owner: Korea Hydro & Nuclear Power
- Operator: Korea Hydro & Nuclear Power

Nuclear power station
- Reactor type: PWR
- Reactor supplier: KEPCO/KHNP
- Cooling source: Sea of Japan
- Thermal capacity: 1 × 2785 MW_{th} 1 × 2775 MW_{th} 3 × 2825 MW_{th} 1 × 2815 MW_{th}

Power generation
- Units operational: 1 × 968 MW; 1 × 969 MW; 2 × 997 MW; 1 × 999 MW; 1 × 998 MW; 2 x 1340 MW
- Make and model: 2 × France CPI; 4 × OPR-1000; 2 × APR-1400
- Units under const.: 2 × 1340 MW APR-1400
- Nameplate capacity: 7268 MW
- Capacity factor: 76.63%
- Annual net output: 39,795 GW·h (2016)

External links
- Commons: Related media on Commons

The Hanul Nuclear Power Plant (originally the Uljin NPP Korean: 울진원자력발전소) is a large nuclear power station in the North Gyeongsang Province of South Korea. The facility has eight pressurized water reactors (PWRs) with total operating capacity of 8561 MW, and a further 2680 MW under construction. The first went online in 1988. In the early 2000s it was the third largest operational nuclear power plant in the world and the second largest in South Korea. The plant's name was changed from Uljin to Hanul in 2013.

On 4 May 2012, ground was broken for two new reactors, Shin ("new") Uljin-1 and -2 using APR-1400 reactors.

Fuel loading completed at Shin Hanul 1 in October 2021. Unit 1 achieved first criticality on 22 May 2022, 11 am local time with electricity generation expected to start in June 2022. Unit 2 achieved criticality on 6 December 2023, 6 am local time, with grid connection expected for 20 December 2023.

The APR-1400 is a Generation III PWR design with a gross capacity of 1400 MW. It is the first to use Korean-made components for all critical systems. In 2012, the reactors were expected to cost about 7 trillion won (US$6 billion), and to be completed by 2018.

In September 2024 South Korea's Nuclear Safety and Security Commission issued a licence to Korea Hydro & Nuclear Power for the construction of units 3 and 4 of the Shin Hanul nuclear power plant, scheduled to be completed by 2032 and 2033, respectively.

== Reactors ==
Unit	Type	Capacity (net)	Construction start	Operation start	Notes
Phase I
Hanul-1	France CPI	968 MW	26 Jan 1983	10 Sept 1988	
Hanul-2	France CPI	969 MW	5 July 1983	30 Sept 1989	
Hanul-3	OPR-1000	997 MW	21 July 1993	11 Aug 1998	
Hanul-4	OPR-1000	999 MW	1 Nov 1993	31 Dec 1999	
Hanul-5	OPR-1000	998 MW	1 Oct 1999	29 July 2004	
Hanul-6	OPR-1000	997 MW	29 Sept 2000	22 Apr 2005	
Phase II
Shin Hanul-1	APR-1400	1340 MW	21 July 2012	9 June 2022	
Shin Hanul-2	APR-1400	1340 MW	19 June 2013	21 Dec 2023	
Shin Hanul-3	APR-1400	1340 MW	20 May 2025	2032 (est)	
Shin Hanul-4	APR-1400	1340 MW	29 May 2026	2033 (est)	

== See also ==
- List of nuclear power stations
- List of power stations in South Korea
- Yeonggwang Nuclear Power Station
