= Future Science Prize =

Chinese science award

The Future Science Prize (Chinese: 未來科學大獎) is a scientific award established in January 2016 by the Future Forum, a non-profit organization based in mainland China. The award has sometimes been called "China's Nobel Prize" by the media. It is awarded to outstanding scientists independently of their nationality, working on three main topics: life sciences, physical sciences, and mathematics and computer science (since 2017).

The prize comes with a reward of ¥6,500,000 (approximately US$1 million).

Nomination is by invitation only, and the review and final decision is taken by a scientific committee.

== Laureates ==
=== Life Science Prize ===
Year	Names	Institution	For
2016	Dennis Lo	Chinese University of Hong Kong	"his seminal contribution to the widely-used noninvasive prenatal test based on the original discovery of fetal DNA in maternal blood."
2017	Shi Yigong	Tsinghua University	"his elucidation of high-resolution structures of the eukaryotic spliceosome, revealing the active-site and the molecular-level mechanism of this key complex in mRNA maturation."
2018	Yuan Longping	National Hybrid Rice Engineering Technology Research Center	"pioneering the use of hybrid vigor to achieve higher yield and increased stress resistance in rice."
2018	Zhang Qifa	Huazhong Agricultural University	"pioneering the use of hybrid vigor to achieve higher yield and increased stress resistance in rice."
2018	Li Jiayang	Institute of Genetics and Developmental Biology	"pioneering the use of hybrid vigor to achieve higher yield and increased stress resistance in rice."
2019	Shao Feng	National Institute of Biological Sciences, Beijing	"his seminal discoveries of cytosolic LPS receptors and downstream effectors in inflammatory responses to pathogenic bacteria."
2020	Zhang Tingdong	Harbin Medical University	"their discoveries of the therapeutic effects of arsenic trioxide and all trans-retinoic acid on acute promyelocytic leukemia."
2020	Wang Zhenyi	Shanghai Jiao Tong University	"their discoveries of the therapeutic effects of arsenic trioxide and all trans-retinoic acid on acute promyelocytic leukemia."
2021	Yuen Kwok-yung	University of Hong Kong	"his discoveries of SARS-CoV-1 as the causative agent for the global SARS outbreak in 2003 and its zoonotic origin, with impact on combating Covid-19 and emerging infectious diseases."
2021	Malik Peiris	University of Hong Kong	"his discoveries of SARS-CoV-1 as the causative agent for the global SARS outbreak in 2003 and its zoonotic origin, with impact on combating Covid-19 and emerging infectious diseases."
2022	Li Wenhui	National Institute of Biological Sciences, Beijing	"his discovery of the Hepatitis B and D virus receptor, sodium taurocholate cotransporting polypeptide (NTCP). This discovery facilitates the development of more effective treatment for hepatitis B and D."
2023	Jijie Chai		"the discovery of resistosomes and elucidation of their molecular structures and functions in plant immune responses against pathogens."
2023	Jian-Min Zhou		"the discovery of resistosomes and elucidation of their molecular structures and functions in plant immune responses against pathogens."
2024	Deng Hongkui	Peking University	"his pioneering work on using small molecules to change cell fate and state, in particular to reprogram somatic cells into pluripotent stem cells."
2025	Qiang Ji	Hebei university of Geosciences	"their discoveries of fossil evidence for the origin of birds from dinosaurs."
2025	Xing Xu	Institute of Vertebrate Paleontology and Paleoanthropology	"their discoveries of fossil evidence for the origin of birds from dinosaurs."
2025	Zhonghe Zhou	Institute of Vertebrate Paleontology and Paleoanthropology	"their discoveries of fossil evidence for the origin of birds from dinosaurs."
2026	Hong Zhang	Institute of Biophysics, Chinese Academy of Sciences	"his pioneering contributions to the mechanism and physiological function of autophagy specific in multicellular organisms."

=== Mathematics and Computer Science Prize ===
Year	Names	Institution	For
2017	Chenyang Xu	Peking University	"his fundamental contributions to birational algebraic geometry."
2018	Burn-Jeng Lin	National Tsing Hua University	"pioneering immersion lithography to continuously scale nano-metric integrated circuit fabrication, reviving and extending Moore’s law for multiple generations.".
2019	Wang Xiaoyun	Tsinghua University	"her seminal contributions to cryptography by innovating cryptanalysis methods to reveal weaknesses of widely used hash functions, which have enabled new generation of cryptographic hash function standards."
2020	Peng Shige	Shandong University	"his pioneering work on the theory of backward stochastic differential equations, nonlinear Feynman-Kac formula, and the theory of nonlinear expectations."
2021	Simon Sze	National Yang Ming Chiao Tung University	"his contributions to understanding carrier transports at the interface between metal and semiconductor, enabling Ohmic and Schottky-contact formations for scaling integrated circuits at the “Moore’s law” rate during the past five decades."
2022	Ngaiming Mok	University of Hong Kong	"developing the theory of Varieties of Minimal Rational Tangents in algebraic geometry to solve several long-standing problems and proving Ax-Schanuel’s conjecture for Shimura varieties."
2023	Kaiming He		"fundamental contributions to artificial intelligence by introducing deep residual learning."
2023	Jian Sun		"fundamental contributions to artificial intelligence by introducing deep residual learning."
2023	Shaoqing Ren		"fundamental contributions to artificial intelligence by introducing deep residual learning."
2023	Xiangyu Zhang		"fundamental contributions to artificial intelligence by introducing deep residual learning."
2024	Sun Binyong	Zhejiang University	"his remarkable contributions to the representation theory of Lie groups."
2025	Chih-Yuan Lu	Macronix	"innovations and leadership in advancing non-volatile semiconductor memory technologies, including cell density, device integration, and data resiliency."
2026	Xinyi Yuan	Peking University	"his fundamental contributions to arithmetic geometry, particularly for developing the theory of arithmetic bigness in Arakelov geometry and for its groundbreaking applications to the uniform Bogomolov conjecture and the uniform Mordell conjecture."

=== Physical Science Prize ===
Year	Names	Institution	For
2016	Xue Qikun	Tsinghua University	"his pioneer work in discoveries of novel quantum phenomena using molecular beam epitaxy, including quantum anomalous Hall effect and monolayer FeSe superconductivity."
2017	Pan Jianwei	University of Science and Technology of China	"his innovative contributions to quantum optical technology, enabling practical implementation of secure communication through quantum key distribution."
2018	Ma Dawei	Shanghai Institute of Organic Chemistry	"inventing new catalysts and chemical reactions, which opened avenues for synthesizing organic molecules, especially pharmaceutical molecules."
2018	Xiaoming Feng	Sichuan University	"inventing new catalysts and chemical reactions, which opened avenues for synthesizing organic molecules, especially pharmaceutical molecules."
2018	Zhou Qilin	Nankai University	"inventing new catalysts and chemical reactions, which opened avenues for synthesizing organic molecules, especially pharmaceutical molecules."
2019	Yifan Wang	Institute of High Energy Physics	"the experimental discovery of a new type of neutrino oscillations, which opens the door for new physics beyond the Standard Model of particle physics, particularly for new CP violation which could be the key to understanding the matter-antimatter asymmetry in the Universe."
2019	Kam-Biu Luk	University of California, Berkeley	"the experimental discovery of a new type of neutrino oscillations, which opens the door for new physics beyond the Standard Model of particle physics, particularly for new CP violation which could be the key to understanding the matter-antimatter asymmetry in the Universe."
2020	Lu Ke (Note: Physicist Lu Ke declined his award in 2020.)	Institute of Metal Research	"his pioneering work in synthesizing and discovering nano-twinned structure and gradient nanostructure that simultaneously exhibit superior strength, ductility and conductivity of copper."
2021	Zhang Jie	Shanghai Jiao Tong University	"his development of laser-based fast electron beam technologies and their applications in ultrafast time-resolved electron microscopy and fast ignition for research towards inertial confinement fusion."
2022	Xueming Yang	Southern University of Science and Technology	"developing new-generation molecular beam techniques with high resolution and sensitivity for state-resolved reaction dynamics studies, revealing quantum resonances and geometric phase effects in chemical reactions."
2022	Jie Zhang	Shanghai Jiao Tong University	"developing new-generation molecular beam techniques with high resolution and sensitivity for state-resolved reaction dynamics studies, revealing quantum resonances and geometric phase effects in chemical reactions."
2023	Zhao Zhongxian		"their seminal breakthroughs in the discovery of high-temperature superconducting materials and systematic advancements in elevating the transition temperature."
2023	Chen Xianhui		"their seminal breakthroughs in the discovery of high-temperature superconducting materials and systematic advancements in elevating the transition temperature."
2024	Yadong Li	Tsinghua University	"their seminal contributions to the development and application of Single-Atom Catalysis."
2024	Zhang Tao	Dalian Institute of Chemical Physics	"their seminal contributions to the development and application of Single-Atom Catalysis."
2025	Xi Dai	Hong Kong University of Science and Technology	"their contributions to the computational prediction and experimental realization of topological electronic materials."
2025	Hong Ding	Shanghai Jiao Tong University	"their contributions to the computational prediction and experimental realization of topological electronic materials."
2025	Zhong Fang	Institute of Physics, Chinese Academy of Sciences	"their contributions to the computational prediction and experimental realization of topological electronic materials."
2026	Dongyuan Zhao	Fudan University	"pioneering contributions to mesoporous materials in the context of synthetic control, mechanistic understanding, and industrial application."
