= Kam-Biu Luk =

American physicist

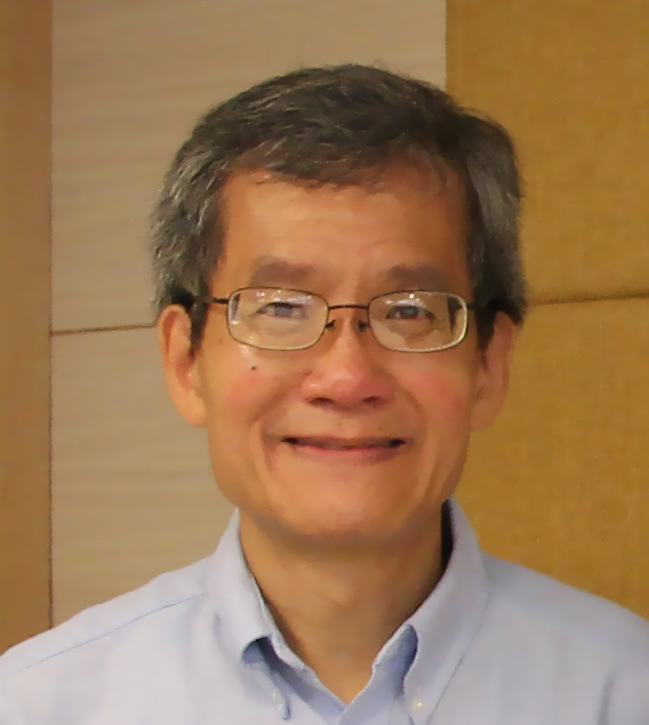
- Born: Hong Kong
- Education: The University of Hong Kong; Rutgers University
- Known for: Neutrino Oscillation; Daya Bay Reactor Neutrino Experiment
- Awards: Sloan Fellowship (1990-94); Panofsky Prize (2014); Fellow of the American Physical Society; Fellow of the American Academy of Arts and Sciences; Breakthrough Prize (2016); Future Science Prize (2019)
- Scientific career
- Fields: Physics; Particle Physics
- Workplaces: University of California at Berkeley; Lawrence Berkeley National Laboratory; Fermilab past

Kam-Biu Luk (Chinese: 陸錦標, born 1953) is a professor of physics, with a focus on particle physics, at UC Berkeley and a senior faculty scientist in the Lawrence Berkeley National Laboratory's physics division. Luk has conducted research on neutrino oscillation and CP violation. Luk and his collaborator Yifang Wang were awarded the 2014 Panofsky Prize "for their leadership of the Daya Bay experiment, which produced the first definitive measurement of θ_{13} angle of the neutrino mixing matrix." His work on neutrino oscillation also received 2016 Breakthrough Prize in Fundamental Physics shared with other teams. He also received a Doctor of Science honoris causa from the Hong Kong University of Science and Technology in 2016. Luk is a fellow of the American Physical Society, and the American Academy of Arts and Sciences.

== Education and career ==
Luk graduated from Ying Wa College in 1973, then graduated from the University of Hong Kong in 1976 with a B.Sc in physics. Shortly thereafter, Luk joined Rutgers University's physics Ph.D. program, completing his Ph.D. in 1983.

Luk continued his work in physics by conducting his postdoctoral research at the University of Washington in Seattle until 1986. In 1986, Luk became an R.R. Wilson Fellow at Fermilab, where he worked as an associate scientist until 1989. In 1989, Luk received a joint appointment as an assistant professor of the Physics Department at UC Berkeley and faculty scientist at the Lawrence Berkeley National Laboratory. During his first two years working in Berkeley, Luk received the "Department of Energy outstanding junior investigator award", which is designed to "identify exceptionally talented new high energy physicists early in their careers, and to assist and facilitate the development of their research programs". Luk was awarded a Sloan Fellowship between 1990 and 1994, which is awarded to "those who show the most outstanding promise of making fundamental contributions to new knowledge".

Luk became a Miller Professor at UC Berkeley in the fall of 2001. He was also a visiting professor in Hong Kong University of Science and Technology. Luk is currently a Hung Hing Ying distinguished visiting professor in science of The University of Hong Kong, and a senior visiting fellow of the Jockey Club Institute for Advanced Study at the Hong Kong University of Science and Technology.

== Research area ==
Luk conducts research in particle physics both as a professor at UC Berkeley and as a scientist at the Lawrence Berkeley National Laboratory. Luk has published a number of papers on neutrino oscillation (see selected publications), including his 2014 Panofsky Prize winning research at the Daya Bay Nuclear Power Plant. Luk is also known for his work on hyperon physics. His Ph.D. dissertation laid the foundation for determining the polarization of the Ω^{−} hyperon. Along with a small group of young colleagues, he initiated Fermilab E756 to measure the magnetic dipole moment of the Omega-minus hyperon. He discovered polarization of the charged anti-cascade hyperon that laid the experimental foundation for investigating CP violation in charged-cascade decays. In the 1990s, Luk proposed the HyperCP (E871) project conducted at Fermilab, where he and a team of scientists conducted an experiment "designed to search for direct CP Violation in strange-baryon decays with the best precision in the world.". He continues to explore CP Violation but in the neutrino sector through the participation of DUNE.

== Selected publications ==
- Luk, Kam-Biu; K. Eguchi; et al. (17 January 2003). "First Results from KamLAND: Evidence for Reactor Antineutrino Disappearance". Physical Review Letters. 90 (2): 6. arXiv:hep-ex/0212021. Bibcode:2003PhRvL..90b1802E. doi:10.1103/PhysRevLett.90.021802. PMID 12570536. S2CID 119344739.
- Luk, Kam-Biu; F. P. An; et al. (7 March 2012). "Observation of Electron-Antineutrino Disappearance at Daya Bay". Physical Review Letters. 108 (17): 7. arXiv:1203.1669. Bibcode:2012PhRvL.108q1803A. doi:10.1103/PhysRevLett.108.171803. PMID 22680853. S2CID 16580300.
- Luk, Kam-Biu; T. Araki; S. Enomoto; K. Furuno; et al. (28 July 2005). "Experimental investigation of geologically produced antineutrinos with KamLAND". Nature. 436 (7050): 499–503. Bibcode:2005Natur.436..499A. doi:10.1038/nature03980. PMID 16049478. S2CID 4367737.
- Luk, Kam-Biu; H.T. Diehl; et al. (12 August 1991). "Measurement of the Ω^{−} Magnetic Moment". Physical Review Letters. 67 (7): 804–807. Bibcode:1991PhRvL67..L.804D. doi:10.1103/PhysRevLett.67.804. PMID 10044993.
- Luk, Kam-Biu; P.M. Ho; et al. (1 October 1990). "Production Polarization and Magnetic Moment of Anti-Ξ^{+} Anti-hyperons produced by 800-GeV/c Protons". Physical Review Letters. 65 (14): 1713–1716. Bibcode:1990PhRvL65qqL1713H. doi:10.1103/PhysRevLett.65.1713. PMID 10042344.
