= Wang Yifang =

Chinese physicist (born 1963)

- 王贻芳
- Born: 20 February 1963 (age 63); Nanjing, Jiangsu, China
- Education: Nanjing University; University of Florence
- Children: 2
- Scientific career
- Fields: Physics
- Workplaces: Institute of High Energy Physics; Jiangmen Underground Neutrino Observatory

Chinese name
- Simplified Chinese: 王贻芳
- Traditional Chinese: 王貽芳
Transcriptions
Standard Mandarin
- Hanyu Pinyin: Wáng Yífāng

Wang Yifang (Chinese: 王贻芳; born February 1963) is a Chinese particle and accelerator physicist. He is director of the Institute of High Energy Physics (IHEP) of the Chinese Academy of Sciences in Beijing and known for contributions to neutrino physics, in particular his leading role (with Kam-Biu Luk) at Daya Bay Reactor Neutrino Experiment to determine the last unknown neutrino mixing angle θ_{13}.

== Career ==
After earning his bachelor's degree in physics at Nanjing University in 1984, he worked with Samuel CC Ting on the L3 experiment located at the Large Electron-Positron Collider (LEP) of CERN. Wang studied at the University of Florence, obtaining his PhD in Physics. He would then go on to work for the Laboratory for Nuclear Science located at the Massachusetts Institute of Technology, and later at Stanford University. He later joined the Institute of High Energy Physics (IHEP) in China as a researcher in 2001, eventually becoming the director in 2011.

== Awards and honors ==
- 2014 Panofsky Prize (shared with Kam-Biu Luk)
- 2015 Member of Chinese Academy of Sciences
- 2016 Breakthrough Prize in Fundamental Physics, with Kam-Biu Luk.
- 2016 Member of The World Academy of Sciences
- 2016 and 2020 Asian Scientist 100, Asian Scientist
- 2019 Future Science Prize
- 2022 Fellow of the American Physical Society
- 2024 Foreign associates of the National Academy of Sciences
- 2025 Foreign Member of the Royal Society

Since 2014 Wang has been Director of the Jiangmen Underground Neutrino Observatory (JUNO) in Southern China leading the experiment in an effect to determine the neutrino mass hierarchy with neutrinos from nuclear reactors.
