= Junwang Tang =

Researcher

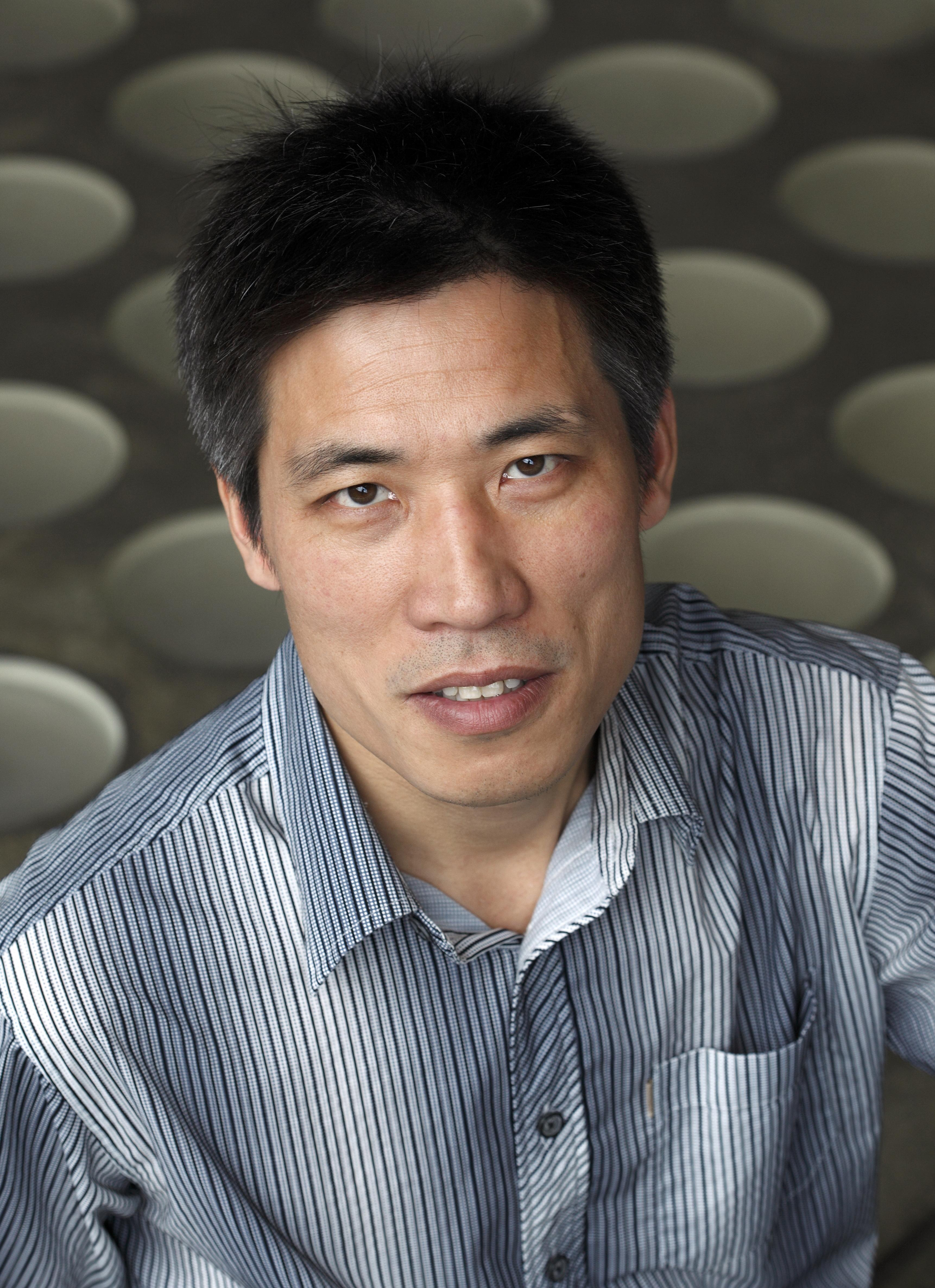
- Education: Northeastern University (China) (BA); Dalian Institute of Chemical Physics (PhD)
- Awards: IChemE Global Business Start-Up Award (2019) IPS Scientist Award (2018)
- Scientific career
- Fields: Solar energy Photochemistry.
- Workplaces: University College London
- Thesis: Microwave catalytic conversion of NOx (2001)
- Doctoral advisor: Tao Zhang
- Website: ucl.ac.uk/solar-energy-advanced-materials/

Junwang Tang, MAE, FRSC and FIMMM, is the Founding Director of Industrial Catalysis Center, and Carbon Neutrality Chair Professor of Materials Chemistry and Catalysis at the Department of Chemical Engineering, Tsinghua University and visiting professor at University College London (UCL). He also served as the Director of the University Material Hub at UCL (2016–2019).

== Education ==
Tang was educated at Northeastern University (China), where he received his BSc degree in chemistry in 1995. Then he attended the Institute of Metal Research in China and was awarded a MSc degree in inorganic materials in 1998. In 2001, Tang was awarded a PhD in physical chemistry with research on heterogeneous catalytic conversion of NO to N_{2}, supervised by Tao Zhang at Dalian Institute of Chemical Physics (DICP), China

== Career ==
In 2002, Tang was awarded a Japan Society for the Promotion of Science (JSPS) search Fellowship and NIMS Researcher, enable to expand his research in photocatalysis in the National Institute for Materials Science (NIMS), Japan. In 2005, he was appointed as a senior research associate in the Department of Chemistry at Imperial College London, UK.

In 2009, Tang was appointed as a lecturer in energy (permanent position) in Department of Chemical Engineering at University College London, then promoted to a senior lecturer in 2011, a readership in 2014 and finally a full professor of materials chemistry and engineering in 2017. During this period, he was also appointed as the director of University Materials Hub. In 2022, Tang moved from UCL to Tsinghua University.

Tang is a member of the Academy of Europe / Academia Europaea, a Royal Society Leverhulme Trust Senior Research Fellow, a Fellow of European Academy of Sciences, a Fellow of Royal Society of Chemistry. He also sits on the editorial board of four international journals, e.g. editor of Applied Catalysis B : Environmental, editor-in-chief of Journal of Advanced Chemical Engineering, associate editor of Asia-Pacific Journal of Chemical Engineering and associate editor of Chin Journal of Catalysis, as well as a member of the committees of the RSC Chemical Nanoscience & Nanotechnology. He also sits on the panel of a few counties' National Science Foundations.

== Research ==
Tang's research interests encompass photocatalytic/thermocatalytic small molecule activation (e.g. CH_{4}, N_{2}, H_{2}O, C_{6}H_{6} and CO_{2}) and microwave catalysis (e.g. plastic recycling), together with the investigation of the underlying charge dynamics and kinetics by state-of-the-art spectroscopies. According to Google Scholar, these research activities result into >250 journal papers in reputable journals.

== Awards and honours ==
- 2001: Outstanding President Prize by The Chinese Academy of Sciences.
- 2003–2005: Japan Society for the Promotion of Science (JSPS) Fellowship by Japan Society for the Promotion of Science.
- 2008: Young Scientist Award for research on renewable solar energy by The International Association of Catalysis Societies.
- 2014: Runner-up of the Global Innovator of the Year by IChemE.
- 2018: IPS Scientist Award in the 22nd International Conference on Chemical Conversion and Storage of Solar Energy.
- 2019: Winner of the IChemE Global Business Start-Up Award 2019 and Runner-up of the IChemE Global Oil and Gas Award 2019 .
- 2021: Winder of the IChemE Innovative Product Global Award.
- 2021: Winner of the 2021 Corday-Morgan Prize from the Royal Society of Chemistry.
- 2021: Winner of the IChemE Medal Round: The Andrew Medal.
- 2021 IChemE Innovative Product Award, IChemE
- 2021 Member of the Academy of Europe
- 2022 IChemE Global Oil and Gas Award
- 2022 Fellow of Institute of Materials, Minerals and Mining
