= Emiel J.M. Hensen =

Dutch chemist

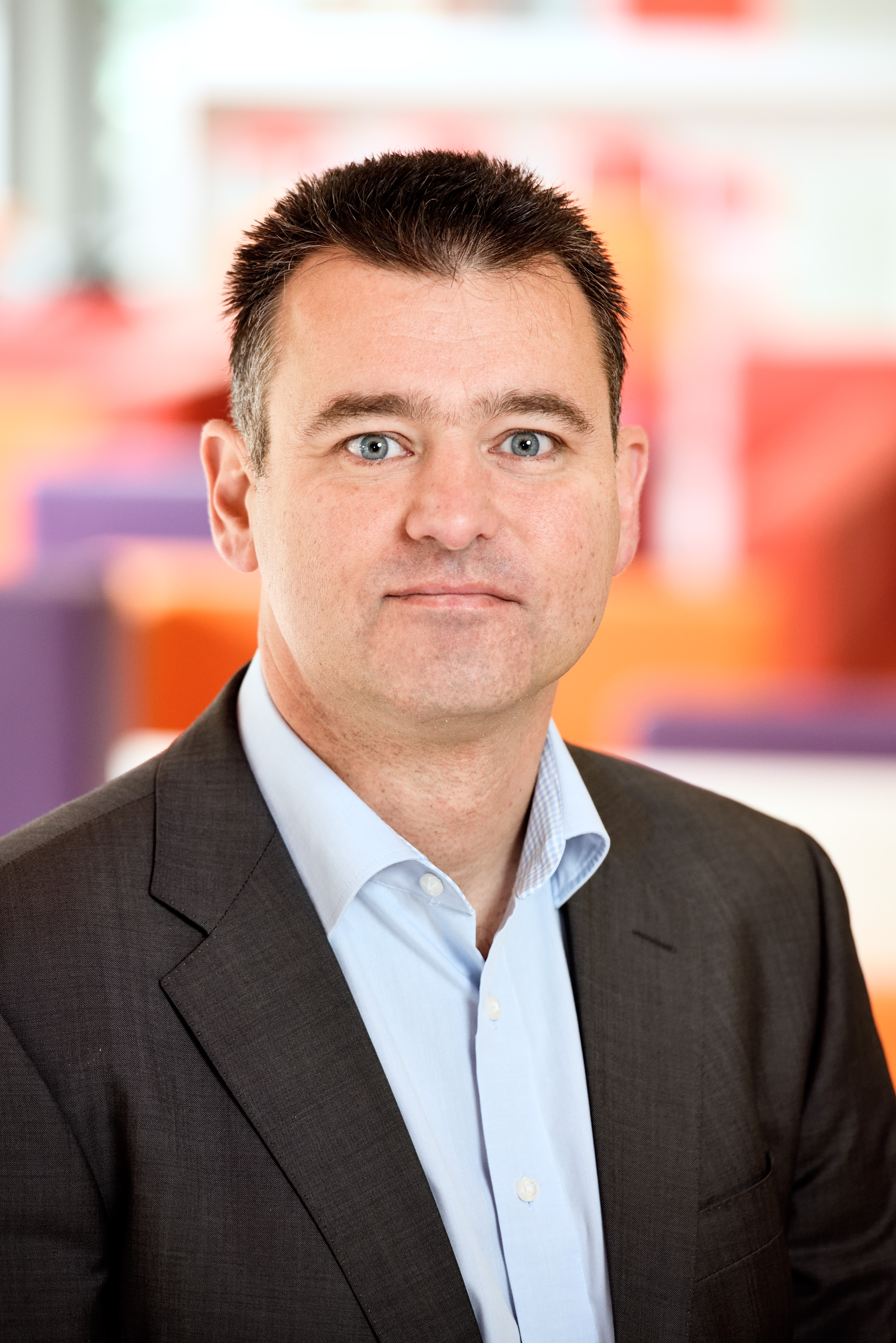
Emiel J.M. Hensen

Emiel Jan Maria Hensen is a Dutch chemist and professor of Inorganic Materials and Catalysis at Eindhoven University of Technology. Hensen's research has focused on developing novel heterogeneous catalysts, kinetics and mechanism, and energy conversion. He leads a team of over 50 researchers working to improve "clean and sustainable chemical conversion processes for the production of fuels and chemicals."

== Biography ==
Hensen was born in Geleen, The Netherlands, on February 5, 1971. He studied chemical engineering at the Eindhoven University of Technology and obtained his master's degree in 1994. He obtained a PhD in 2000 from the same institution under the supervision of Prof. Rutger van Santen and Prof. Rob van Veen. During his PhD, he studied transition metal sulphide catalysts used for desulfurization of oil.

Hensen continued his career in academia by moving to the University of Amsterdam. He worked as an assistant professor under Professor Berend Smit. In 2001, he returned to Eindhoven to become an assistant professor. Between 2006 and 2008, he worked for Shell Research and Technology Centre Amsterdam sponsored by a Casimir grant from the Dutch government. He was promoted associate professor of TU/e in 2008 and full professor in 2009 chairing the Inorganic Materials and Catalysis group of the department of Chemical Engineering and Chemistry. He has been a visiting teaching professor for 15 years (2001-2016) at the Katholieke Universiteit Leuven in Belgium. He has collaborated with Dalian Institute of Chemical Physics (where he now serves as a member of the international advisory board), Xiamen University, Jilin University, VITEC in Thailand, and Hokkaido University.

From 2016 to 2020, Hensen served as the Dean of the department of Chemical Engineering and Chemistry of Eindhoven University of Technology. Hensen is an active member of the Netherlands Advanced Research Center Chemical Building Blocks Consortium (ARC-CBBC), the chairman of the Netherlands Institute for Catalysis Research (NIOK) and a member of the management team of the national (Dutch) program Multiscale Catalytic Energy Conversion (MCEC). He is a foreign expert at the Xiamen University and Jilin University in China. He also serves as the Dutch representative in the board of the European Research Institute of Catalysis (ERIC).

== Prize and Grants ==
Emiel Hensen obtained Veni, Vidi, and Vici grants from the Netherlands Organization for Scientific Research (NWO). In 2002, he was awarded a Veni grant on a topic related to valorization of lower paraffins. In 2006, he became a Casimir grant laureate allowing him to work as a visiting scientist at Shell research. Hensen was awarded a Vidi grant in 2007 for developing hierarchically porous catalysts and obtained in 2013 both Vici and TOP grants for carrying out research on structure sensitivity and in-situ x-ray diffraction investigations of catalyst nanoparticles, respectively.

== Research activities (publications) ==
Hensen co-authored more than 550 papers.

== Educational activities ==
Hensen is involved in teaching activities in the bachelor and master curriculum of TU/e with focus on catalysis and inorganic chemistry. His research group hosts every year many MSc and BSs students for the completion of their end projects.
