= Aberdeen Tunnel Underground Laboratory =

Particle physics laboratory

Coordinates: 22.2681°N 114.1804°E

The Aberdeen Tunnel Underground Laboratory (Chinese: 香港仔隧道粒子物理實驗室) is a particle physics laboratory in Hong Kong. It is the only underground particle physics lab in Hong Kong. The laboratory is situated between the two vehicular tunnel tubes, behind Gates 2 and 5 of Aberdeen Tunnel on Hong Kong Island.

== History ==
Commissioned by the University of Hong Kong (HKU) after an assessment of all existing tunnels in Hong Kong, the location of the Aberdeen Tunnel, then under construction in the valley between Mount Cameron and Mount Nicholson, was deemed the most suitable site for undertaking particle physics experimentation. Funded entirely by HKU, construction work on the laboratory was completed in 1980.

The laboratory was practically abandoned after HKU researchers completed their experiments, as no other experiments of a similar nature made further use of the facility. However, in 2006, HKU and the Chinese University of Hong Kong petitioned the Aberdeen Tunnel administration for permission to reuse the laboratory, in order to participate in a Daya Bay Reactor Neutrino Experiment by the Daya Bay Nuclear Power Plant. Due to the high amount of traffic through the tunnel, researchers only have access to the laboratory 3 to 4 times per week, mostly during late night and early morning hours. During these experiments, maintenance and cleaning operations within the tunnel have to be suspended, and all traffic is rerouted through one tunnel tube.

== Collaborators ==
- Brookhaven National Laboratory
- Chinese University of Hong Kong
- University of California at Berkeley
- National Chiao-Tung University
- National Taiwan University
- National United University
- University of Hong Kong
