= Farabi Petrochemicals =

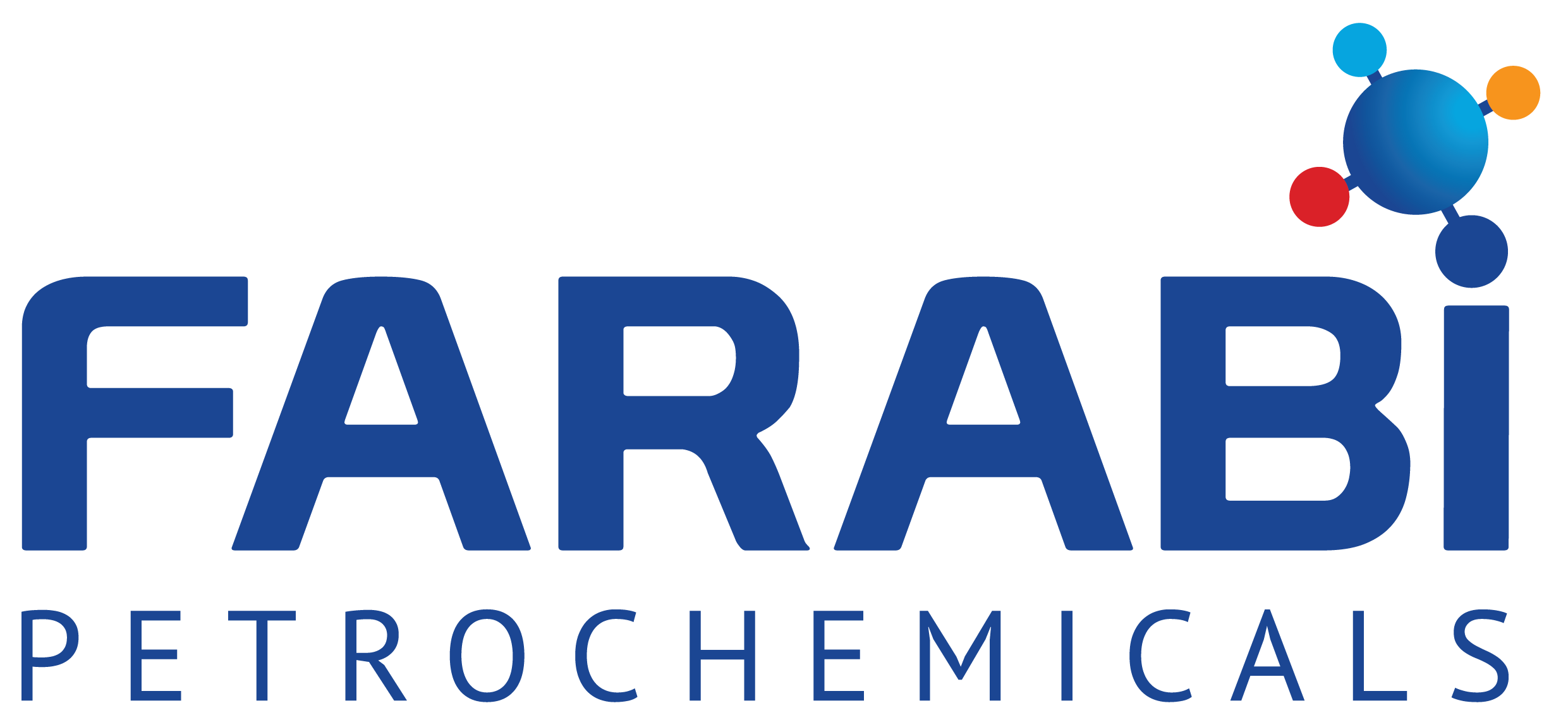
- Adding Value Through Chemistry...
- Industry: Chemical manufacturing, home care and laundry products
- Founded: 2006; 20 years ago
- Headquarters: Jubail, Saudi Arabia
- Area served: Middle East
- Key people: Mohammed AlWadaey (CEO)
- Products: n-paraffin, linear alkylbenzene
- Website: www.farabipc.com/en

Farabi Petrochemicals Group is a petrochemicals company based in Saudi Arabia. It is the world's largest producer of n-paraffin and linear alkylbenzene (LAB) globally.

The Farabi Group consists of several companies including: Farabi Petrochemicals Company (FPC), Farabi Yanbu Petrochemicals Company (FYPC), Farabi Downstream Company (FDC), HADAF International Energy Company (HADAF), and Farabi Marketing Company (FMC). These companies are located in Jubail and Yanbu industrial cities of KSA.

Farabi currently operates two large-scale alkane plants and three large-scale LAB plants. Additionally, specialty oils and specialty chemicals plants are situated in Yanbu and Jubail industrial cities.

In 2023, Farabi completed a deal to acquire 50 percent of shares in Great Orient Chemical Pte. Ltd.

== See also ==
- List of companies of Saudi Arabia
