= Hanbit Nuclear Power Plant =

Nuclear power plant in South Korea

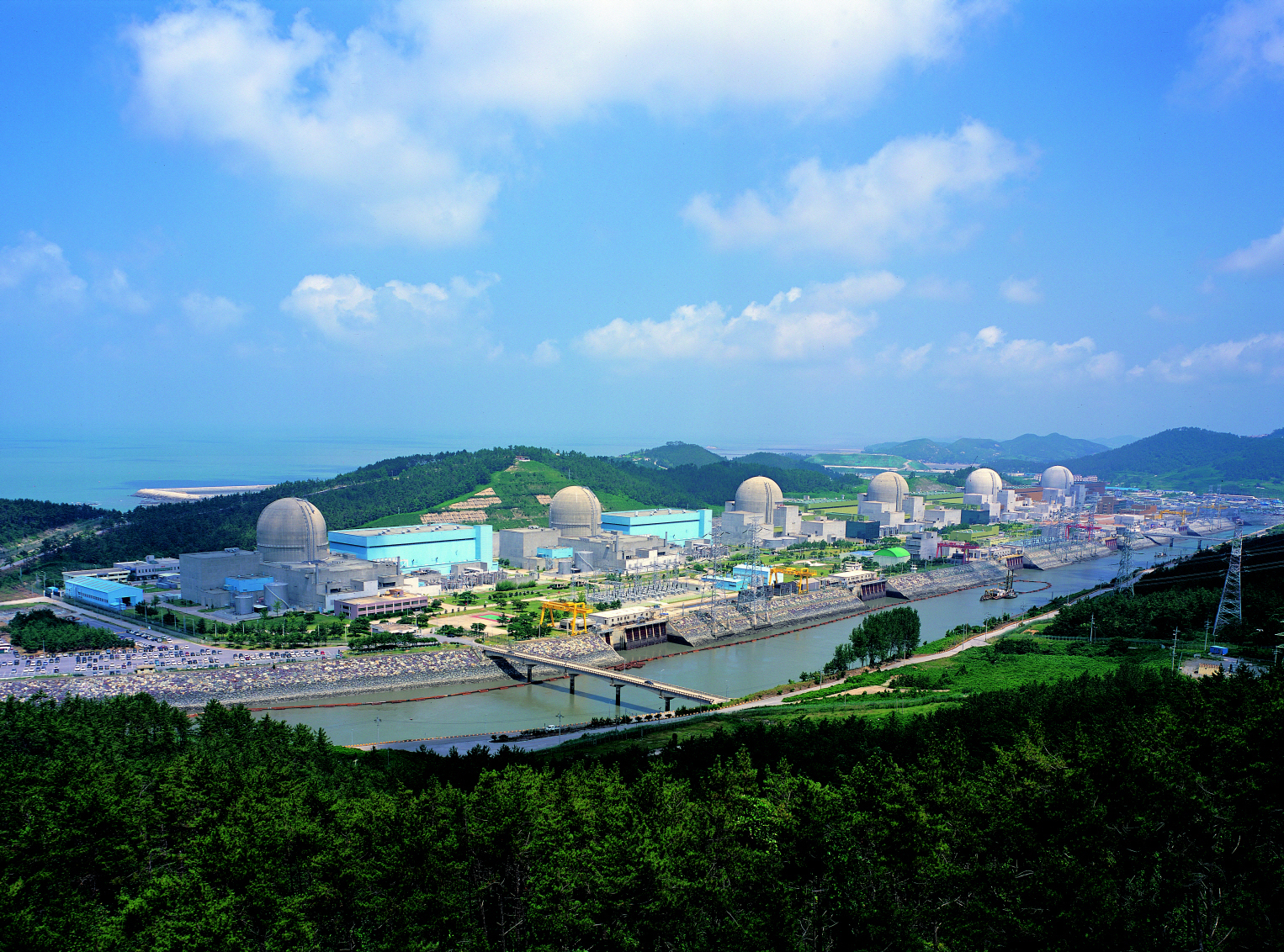
- Hanbit (formerly Yonggwang) Nuclear Power Plant
- Official name: 한빛원자력발전소 한빛原子力發電所
- Country: South Korea
- Location: Jeollanam-do
- Coordinates: 35°24′54″N 126°25′26″E
- Status: Operational
- Commission date: 1986
- Operator: Korea Hydro & Nuclear Power

Nuclear power station
- Reactor type: PWR

Power generation
- Units operational: 1 × 947 MW; 1 × 953 MW; 1 × 988 MW; 1 × 994 MW; 1 × 996 MW; 1 × 997 MW
- Nameplate capacity: 5,875 MW

External links
- Website: yk.khnp.co.kr
- Commons: Related media on Commons

The Hanbit Nuclear Power Plant is a large nuclear power station in the Jeollanam-do province of South Korea. The facility runs at an installed capacity of 5,875 MW. The power station is currently ranked as the fifth largest nuclear power station in the world. The plant's name was changed from Yeonggwang NPP to Hanbit in 2013 at the request of local fishermen.

All the units at Hanbit are of the Pressurized Water Reactor (PWR) reactor type. Unit-1 and Unit-2 are 3-loop Westinghouse-designed plants; major components were sourced from foreign firms while auxiliary components and site construction were handled domestically. Unit-3 and Unit-4 are 2-loop Combustion Engineering (C-E) System 80 plants with major components and construction handled domestically under a technology transfer agreement. Unit-5 and Unit-6 are based on the Ulchin (now Hanul) Unit-3 OPR-1000 Korean Standard Nuclear Power Plant design.

Unit	Type	Net Capacity	Construction start	Operation start	Notes
Hanbit-1	WH F	959	4 Jun 1981	25 Aug 1986	
Hanbit-2	WH F	958	10 Dec 1981	10 Jun 1987	
Hanbit-3	OPR-1000	998	23 Dec 1989	31 Mar 1995	
Hanbit-4	OPR-1000	997	26 May 1990	1 Jan 1996	
Hanbit-5	OPR-1000	993	29 Jun 1997	21 May 2002	
Hanbit-6	OPR-1000	993	20 Nov 1997	24 Dec 2002	

== Incidents ==
In November 2012, security checkups prompted by the Fukushima Daiichi nuclear disaster revealed that from 2003, eight suppliers had forged quality certificates for a delivered 7,682 items to the plant. Of the plant's six reactors, two were affected by more than 5,000 of those parts and were consequently shut down, for an expected eight weeks. According to the Yonhap news agency, the incident was likely to seriously undermine the confidence in South Korean nuclear reactors and could thus impede the country's export of nuclear power plants. Knowledge Economy Minister Hong Suk-woo responded that the "government plans to further increase its efforts to export nuclear reactors. In this regard, the government will quickly provide all necessary and accurate facts to prospective foreign buyers to make sure there is not a single shred of doubt left over the safety of the country's nuclear reactors".

A serious transient incident occurred in Hanbit 1 on May 10, 2019 during a low power test. Under the circumstances power was not allowed to exceed 5 percent of full power, but due to mis-calculation and careless withdrawal of control rods, and also one rod in stuck position, the power went up to 18 per cent. The incident was classified as INES level 2.

== See also ==
- Reactor Experiment for Neutrino Oscillation
- List of nuclear power stations
- List of power stations in South Korea
