= Track significance =

Track significance, in high energy collision experiments, is defined as the ratio between the impact parameter of a track (distance from the primary vertex) and the estimated error in it.

Formula

$S= a_o/Error(a_o)$
