= Radiation Detection Technology and Methods =

Peer-reviewed scientific journal

- Discipline: Radiation detection
- Language: English
- Edited by: Jingbo Ye

Publication details
- History: 2017—present
- Publisher: Springer
- Frequency: Quarterly
- Impact factor: 2.0 (2024)

Standard abbreviations
- ISO 4: Radiat. Detect. Technol. Methods

Indexing
- ISSN: 2509-9930 (print); 2509-9949 (web)

Links
- Journal homepage; Online access; Online archive

Radiation Detection Technology and Methods is a peer-reviewed scientific journal published quarterly by Springer Science+Business Media on behalf of Institute of High Energy Physics of Chinese Academy of Sciences. Established in 2017, it covers developments in radiation detection technology and methods, including detection methods, electronics and system design, control technologies and particle acceleration. Its current editor-in-chief is Jingbo Ye (Southern Methodist University).

== Abstracting and indexing ==
The journal is abstracted and indexed in:

- Emerging Sources Citation Index
- Inspec
- Scopus

According to the Journal Citation Reports, the journal has a 2024 impact factor of 2.0.
