= Yangbajain Cosmic Ray National Field Scientific Observatory =

Chinese observatory

The Yangbajain Cosmic Ray National Field Scientific Observatory in Tibet (Chinese: 西藏羊八井宇宙线国家野外科学观测研究站), Tibet AS⁢γ Collaboration, or Yangbajing Cosmic Ray National Field Scientific Observatory, is one of the national field scientific observatories recognized by the Ministry of Science and Technology of the People's Republic of China.

== History ==
The observatory station was founded in 1989 by Institute of High Energy Physics, and collaboration with Tibet University, Southwest Jiaotong University, Yunnan University and University of Tokyo, Japan. The observatory is located in the northern suburb of Lhasa, in the town of Yangbajain, at an altitude of 4,300 meters above sea level. The station is subordinate to the Institute of High Energy Physics of the Chinese Academy of Sciences.

The station is the first and only station to have a cosmic ray observation window of 1013eV. Since EAS has been developed to such an extent that precise measurements can be made, the station is the best site for high-altitude cosmic ray observatories in the world, and holds an important position in the international cosmic ray observation and research field. In 1990, CAS and the University of Tokyo in Japan, cooperated in the ASγ experiment, gradually increasing the scope of cooperation and establishing the Sino-Japanese Cooperation Neutron Telescope, the Sino-Japanese Cooperation Neutron Monitor, the Latex Chamber, and so on. The Yangbajain Observatory also carried out the ARGO-YBJ experiment, a Chinese-Italian collaboration. At a later stage of the ARGO-YBJ experiment, the ASγ experiment was upgraded with the addition of a muon detector and a core detector.

In 2007, the research station was approved to be established as a National Field Scientific Observation Research Station. On October 12, 2009, the "Tibet Yangbajain Cosmic Ray National Field Scientific Observatory" and the "International Scientific and Technological Cooperation Base" awarded by the Ministry of Science and Technology were held at the station. On July 3, 2019, the Institute of High Energy announced that the Yangbajing ASγ experiment had detected cosmic gamma rays at 450 TeV from the direction of the Crab Nebula, the first detection of photons above 100 TeV.
