= Reactor Experiment for Neutrino Oscillation =

Neutrino oscillation experiment in South Korea

The Reactor Experiment for Neutrino Oscillation (RENO) is a short baseline reactor neutrino oscillation experiment in South Korea. The experiment was designed to either measure or set a limit on the neutrino mixing matrix parameter θ_{13}, a parameter responsible for oscillations of electron neutrinos into other neutrino flavours. RENO has two identical detectors, placed at distances of 294 m and 1383 m, that observe electron antineutrinos produced by six reactors at the Hanbit Nuclear Power Plant (the old name: the Yeonggwang Nuclear Power Plant) in Korea.

Each detector consists of 16.5 t of gadolinium-doped liquid scintillator (LAB), surrounded by an additional 450 tons of buffer, veto, and shielding liquids.

On 3 April 2012, with some corrections on 8 April, the RENO collaboration announced a 4.9σ observation of θ_{13} ≠ 0, with

$\sin^2 2\theta_{13} = 0.113 \pm 0.013({\rm stat.}) \pm 0.019({\rm syst.})$

This measurement confirmed a similar result announced by the Daya Bay Experiment three weeks before and is consistent with earlier, but less significant results by T2K, MINOS and Double Chooz.

RENO released updated results in December 2013, confirming θ_{13} ≠ 0 with a significance of 6.3σ:

$$\sin^2 2 \theta_{13} = 0.100 \pm 0.010({\rm stat.}) \pm 0.015({\rm syst.})$$

In 2014, RENO announced the observation of an unexpectedly large number of neutrinos with an energy of 5±1 MeV. This has since been confirmed by the Daya Bay and Double Chooz experiments, and the cause remains an outstanding puzzle.

Expansion plans, referred to as RENO-50, will add a third medium-baseline detector at a distance of 47 km. This distance is better for observing neutrino oscillations, but requires a much larger detector due to the smaller neutrino flux. The location, near Dongshin University, has a 450 m high mountain (Mt. Guemseong), which will provide 900 m.w.e. shielding for the detector. If funded, this will contain 18000 t of scintillator, surrounded by 15000 photomultiplier tubes.
