= Fang Zhong =

Chinese physicist (born 1970)

- 方忠
- Born: July 1970 (age 56); Wuhan, Hubei, China
- Education: Huazhong University of Science and Technology
- Awards: Future Science Prize (2025)
- Scientific career
- Fields: Condensed matter physics
- Workplaces: Institute of Physics, Chinese Academy of Sciences

Fang Zhong (Chinese: 方忠; pinyin: Fāng Zhōng; born July 1970) is a Chinese theoretical physicist and the current director of the Institute of Physics, Chinese Academy of Sciences.

== Biography ==
Fang was born in Wuhan, Hubei province in 1970. He received his bachelor's degree and doctor's degree from Huazhong University of Science and Technology in 1991 and 1996, respectively.

After university, he became a visiting scholar at the Industrial Technology Research Institute in Japan and Oak Ridge National Laboratory in the United States. He returned to China in 2003 and became a research follow at the Institute of Physics, Chinese Academy of Sciences in Beijing. He served as deputy director of the Institute of Physics, Chinese Academy of Sciences in 2012, and five years later promoted to the Director position. On November 21, 2017, he was appointed director of the Beijing National Research Center for Condensed Matter Physics.

== Honours and awards ==
- 2008 Mao Yisheng Youth Science and Technology Award; ICTP Award of the International Centre for Theoretical Physics (ICTP)
- 2010 C. N. YangAward of the Asia Pacific Federation of physical Societies
- 2011 Fellow of the American Physical Society (APS)
- 2012 Asia Achievement Award of the Global Chinese Physics Society
- 2013 Zhou Peiyuan Physics Award
- November 22, 2019 Academician of the Chinese Academy of Sciences (CAS)
- 2025 Future Science Prize.
