= Jiangmen Underground Neutrino Observatory =

Physics experiment at Guangdong, China

Coordinates: 22.11827°N 112.51867°E

The Jiangmen Underground Neutrino Observatory (JUNO) is a medium baseline reactor neutrino experiment currently operating at Kaiping, Jiangmen in Guangdong province in Southern China. It aims to determine the neutrino mass hierarchy and perform precision measurements of the Pontecorvo–Maki–Nakagawa–Sakata matrix elements. Funding is provided by a collaboration of international institutions. JUNO is the world's largest transparent spherical detector. It is located 52.5 km from both of the Yangjiang and Taishan nuclear power plants. JUNO includes 750 member scientists from 17 countries, the largest international collaboration to work on an experiment in China.

== History ==
The collaboration was formed in July 2014 and construction began January 10, 2015. Originally scheduled to begin taking data in 2023, the US$376 million facility began experimenting on 26 August 2025.

Planned as a follow-on to the Daya Bay Reactor Neutrino Experiment, it was originally to be sited in the same area, but the construction of a third nuclear reactor (the Lufeng Nuclear Power Plant) in that region would disrupt the experiment, which requires a specific distance from nuclear reactors.

In 2015 JUNO developed photo tubes that were twice as efficient at collecting photons as others.

In 2026, using two months of data, JUNO captured details of how neutrinos can switch identities, with better precision.

Neutrinos (any type) have masses of three possible values. Two are close to each other, while the third has a larger gap. Two of the values are small and one is larger or vice versa.

== Detector ==
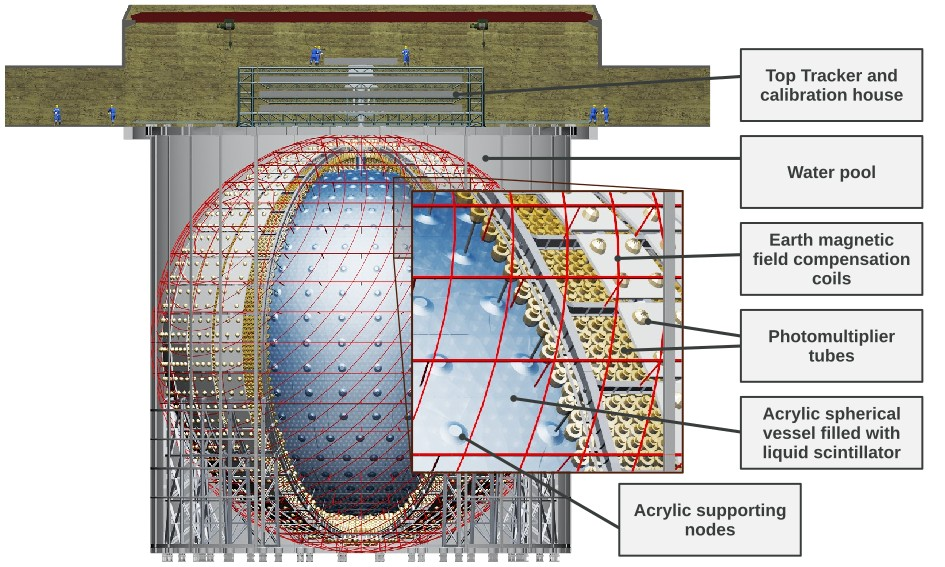
JUNO detector

The main detector consists of a 35.4 m (116 ft) diameter transparent acrylic glass sphere containing 20,000 tonnes of linear alkylbenzene liquid scintillator, surrounded by a stainless steel truss supporting approximately 43,200 photomultiplier tubes (17,612 large 20-inch (51 cm) diameter tubes, and 25,600 3-inch (7.6 cm) tubes filling in the gaps between them), immersed in a water pool instrumented with 2,400 additional photomultiplier tubes as a muon veto. Construction was finished and operation began in 2025. The detector is deployed 700 m (2,300 ft) underground, helping reduce background and enabling it to detect neutrinos with excellent energy resolution. The overburden includes 270 m of granite mountain, which reduces the cosmic muon background.

The much larger distance to the reactors (compared to less than 2 km for the Daya Bay far detector) makes the experiment better able to distinguish neutrino oscillations, but requires a much larger, and better-shielded, detector to detect a sufficient number of reactor neutrinos.

== Physics ==
Predicted oscillation probability of electron neutrinos (black) oscillating to muon (blue) or tau (red) neutrinos, as a function of distance from source. Existing short-baseline experiments measure the first small dip in the black curve at 500 km/GeV; JUNO will observe the large dip at 16000 km/GeV. For reactor neutrinos with an energy of ≈3 MeV, the distances are ≈1.5 km and ≈50 km, respectively. This plot is based on assumed mixing parameters; the measured shape will differ and allow the actual parameters to be computed.

The main approach of the JUNO Detector in measuring neutrino oscillations is the observation of electron antineutrinos (ν̅_{e}) coming from two nuclear power plants at approximately 53 km distance. Since the expected rate of neutrinos reaching the detector is known from processes in the power plants, the absence of a certain neutrino flavor can give an indication of transition processes. JUNO data may also provide insights into neutrinoless double beta decay.

The quantitative part of the experiment requires measuring neutrino flavour oscillations as a function of distance. This seems impossible, as both the reactors and detector are completely immovable, but the speed of oscillation varies with energy (details at Neutrino oscillation § Propagation and interference). As the reactors emit neutrinos with a range of energies, a range of effective distances can be observed, limited by the accuracy with which each neutrino's energy can be measured.

Although not the primary goal, the detector is sensitive to atmospheric neutrinos, geoneutrinos and neutrinos from supernovae as well.

JUNO counts the number of electron neutrinos that cross the detector without switching and how that number changes depending on the neutrinos’ energies. Physicists have developed theoretical models that estimate how and how often neutrinos switch flavours. JUNO measured two parameters with 1.6 better precision than before.

=== Expected sensitivity ===
Daya Bay and RENO measured θ_{13} and determined it has a large non-zero value. Daya Bay will be able to measure the value to ≈4% precision and RENO ≈7% after several years. JUNO is designed to improve uncertainty in several neutrino parameters to less than 1%.

== See also ==
- Daya Bay
- RENO
- Double Chooz
- KamLAND
- NOνA
- Wang Yifang
