= Zhang Tao (chemist) =

Chinese chemist

Tao Zhang
- 张涛
- Alma mater: Shaanxi University of Technology (BS); Dalian Institute of Chemical Physics (MS, PhD)
- Known for: Introducing the concept of "single-atom catalysis"; catalytic conversion of cellulose to ethylene glycol
- Awards: Future Science Prize (2024); Humboldt Research Award; Citation Laureate (2025)
- Scientific career
- Fields: Heterogeneous catalysis, single-atom catalysis, biomass conversion
- Workplaces: Dalian Institute of Chemical Physics, Chinese Academy of Sciences
- Website: taozhang.dicp.ac.cn

Tao Zhang (Chinese: 张涛) is a Chinese chemist and Academician of the Chinese Academy of Sciences (CAS), working in heterogeneous catalysis. He is a professor at the Dalian Institute of Chemical Physics (DICP), which he directed from 2007 to 2016, and served as a Vice President of CAS from 2016 to 2023. He is known for introducing the concept of single-atom catalysis and for work on the catalytic conversion of cellulose to ethylene glycol.

== Education ==
Zhang received a B.S. in chemistry from Shaanxi University of Technology (1978–1982). He then studied catalysis at DICP, earning an M.S. (1983–1986) and a Ph.D. (1986–1989). From 1989 to 1990 he was a postdoctoral researcher at the School of Chemistry, University of Birmingham, United Kingdom.

== Career ==
Zhang joined the faculty of DICP as an assistant professor in 1990, became associate professor in 1992 and full professor in October 1995. He was deputy director of DICP from 1998 to 2007 and director from February 2007 to December 2016. From December 2016 to September 2023 he was a Vice President of the Chinese Academy of Sciences.

He is Editor-in-Chief of the Chinese Journal of Catalysis and an Associate Editor of the Journal of the American Chemical Society. He is co-chair of the editorial advisory board of Chemistry – A European Journal and sits on the editorial boards of Applied Catalysis B, Green Chemistry, ACS Sustainable Chemistry & Engineering, ChemPhysChem and Industrial & Engineering Chemistry Research.

== Research ==
=== Single-atom catalysis ===
Zhang and co-workers reported a platinum catalyst in which isolated Pt atoms are anchored on iron oxide (Pt_{1}/FeO_{x}) and showed activity for CO oxidation and preferential oxidation of CO; the work introduced the term "single-atom catalysis". Single-atom catalysts aim for atomically defined active sites and maximal use of precious metals, and the area has since become an active field in heterogeneous catalysis, studied by many research groups worldwide.

=== Cellulose to ethylene glycol ===
Zhang's group reported the catalytic conversion of cellulose to ethylene glycol over tungsten carbide-based catalysts, a route to a bulk chemical from biomass.

== Honours and awards ==
Year	Award
2026	Tan Kah Kee Science Award
2026	Humboldt Research Award
2026	First Prize, State Natural Science Award (2025 cycle)
2025	National Catalysis Achievement Award of China
2025	Clarivate Citation Laureate
2025	Karl Wamsler Innovation Award in Catalysis Research
2024	Future Science Prize (Physical Science / Chemistry)
2024	Chinese Chemical Society Tang Ao-Chin Award in Chemistry
2024	Hans Fischer Award, Technical University of Munich
2023	Distinguished Award of the Chinese Chemical Society–SINOPEC
2023	Advance of Catalysis Award, Asia-Pacific Association of Catalysis Societies
2020	International Fellow, Canadian Academy of Engineering
2019	ChinaNano Award
2018	Fellow, World Academy of Sciences (TWAS)
2018	Science China Materials Innovation Award
2018	ExxonMobil Chair Professor, National University of Singapore
2016	Science and Technology Progress Award, Ho Leung Ho Lee Foundation
2013	Member, Chinese Academy of Sciences
2012	Fellow, Royal Society of Chemistry
2010	Distinguished Award of the Chinese Academy of Sciences
2009	Zhou Guangzhao Foundation Award for Applied Science
2008	Excellent Young Scientist Award, Chinese Catalysis Society
2008, 2006, 2005	National Technology Invention Award (Second Class)
2003	Outstanding Young Scientists award, National Natural Science Foundation of China
