= Vanishing dimensions theory =

Vanishing-dimensions theory is a particle physics theory suggesting that systems with higher energy have a smaller number of dimensions.

For example, the theory implies that the Universe had fewer dimensions after the Big Bang when its energy was high. Then the number of dimensions may have increased as the system cooled and the Universe may gain more dimensions with time. There could have originally been only one spatial dimension, with two dimensions total –one time dimension and one space dimension. When there were only two dimensions, the Universe lacked gravitational degrees of freedom.

The theory is also tied to smaller amount of dimensions in smaller systems with the universe expansion being a suggested motivating phenomenon for growth of the number of dimensions with time, suggesting a larger number of dimensions in systems on larger scale.

In 2011, Dejan Stojkovic from the University at Buffalo and Jonas Mureika from the Loyola Marymount University described use of a Laser Interferometer Space Antenna system, intended to detect gravitational waves, to test the vanishing-dimension theory by detecting a maximum frequency after which gravitational waves can't be observed.

The vanishing-dimensions theory is seen as an explanation to cosmological constant problem: a fifth dimension would answer the question of energy density required to maintain the constant.
