= Taihe, Henan =

Taihe 太和镇
- Town
- Location in Henan
- Coordinates: 32°52′19″N 112°56′22″E
- Country: People's Republic of China
- Province: Henan
- Prefecture-level city: Nanyang
- County: Sheqi County
- Time zone: UTC+8 (China Standard)

Taihe (Chinese: 太和; pinyin: Tàihé) is a town under the administration of Sheqi County, Henan, China. As of 2020, it has eight villages under its administration:

- Liuji Village (刘集村)
- Fanlou Village (范楼村)
- Mageng Village (马埂村)
- Yandiangang Village (闫店岗村)
- Songzhuang Village (宋庄村)
- Houzhao Village (后赵村)
- Yugou Village (余沟村)
- Yunling Village (云岭村)
