= Ma Dawei =

Chinese chemist and research professor

- 马大为
- Born: September 11, 1963 (age 62); Sheqi County, Henan, China
- Education: Shandong University; University of Pittsburgh
- Scientific career
- Fields: Organic chemistry
- Workplaces: Shanghai institute of Organic Chemistry, Chinese Academy of Sciences
- Doctoral advisor: Lu Xiyan

Chinese name
- Traditional Chinese: 馬大為
- Simplified Chinese: 马大为
Transcriptions
Standard Mandarin
- Hanyu Pinyin: Mǎ Dàwéi

Ma Dawei (Chinese: 马大为; born September 11, 1963) is a Chinese chemist and research professor at the Shanghai institute of Organic Chemistry, Chinese Academy of Sciences (CAS).

== Early life and education ==
Ma was born on September 11, 1963, into a teacher's family in Sheqi County, Henan. In September 1980 he entered Shandong University, where he graduated in July 1984 with a Bachelor of Science degree. In September 1984 he studied under Lu Xiyan at the Shanghai institute of Organic Chemistry, Chinese Academy of Sciences (CAS), earning a Doctor of Science degree in July 1989. From May 1990 he conducted postdoctoral research at the University of Pittsburgh and Mayo Clinic in the United States.

== Career ==
He returned to China in 1994 and joined the Shanghai institute of Organic Chemistry, Chinese Academy of Sciences (CAS). In January 1995 he was promoted to research follow. In 1997 became an adjunct professor at Fudan University.

== Honours and awards ==
- 1997 Distinguished Young Scholar by the National Science Fund
- 1998 Outstanding Young Scholars Award of the Qiushi Science and Technology Foundation
- 2007 State Natural Science Award (Second Class)
- 2016 N. C. Yang Lecturer Award
- August 2017, Arthur C. Cope Scholar Award of the American Chemical Society (ACS)
- September 2018, Materials Science Award of the Future Science Awards
- November 2019, Member of the Chinese Academy of Sciences (CAS)
