= Sheqi County =

Sheqi County 社旗县
- County
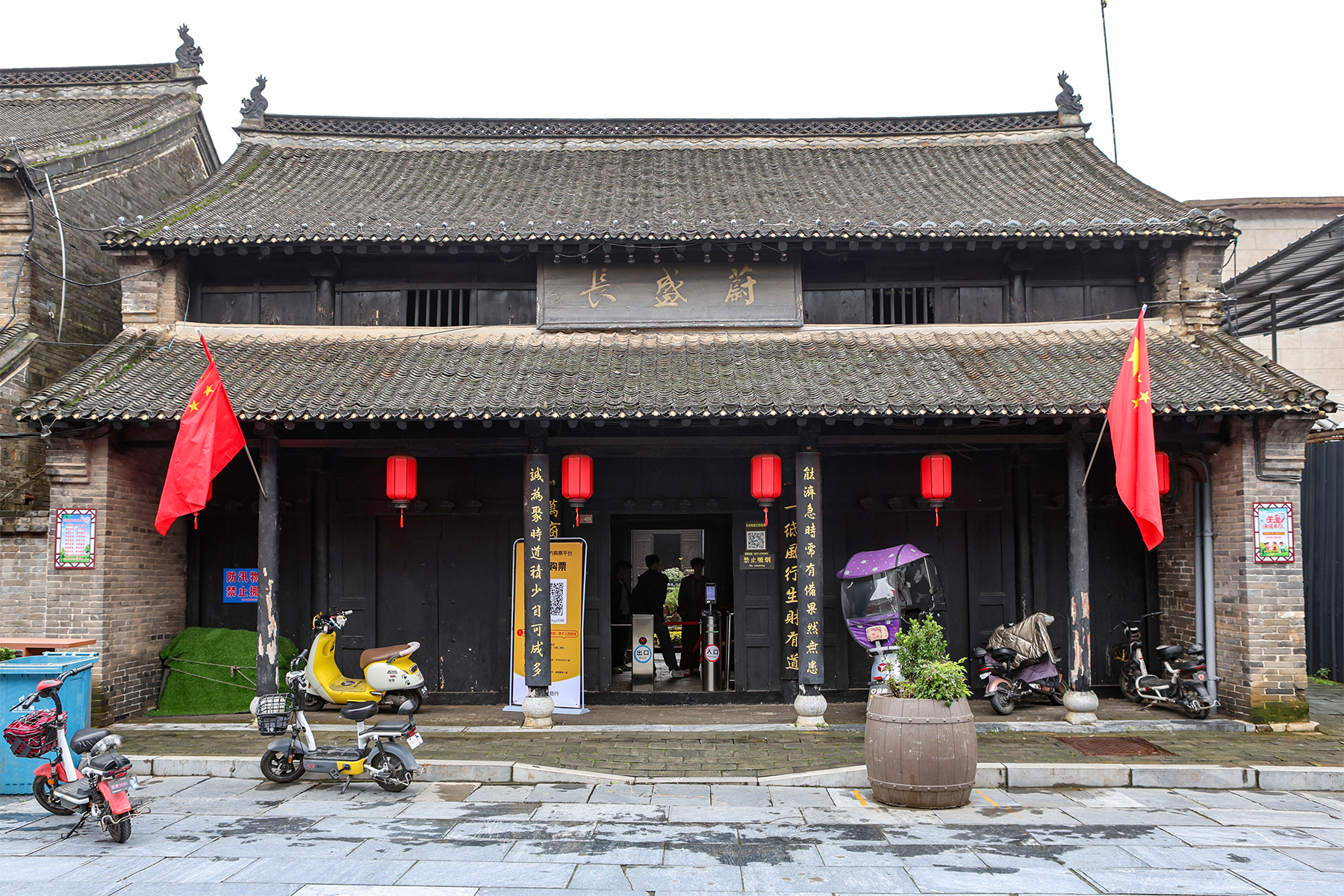
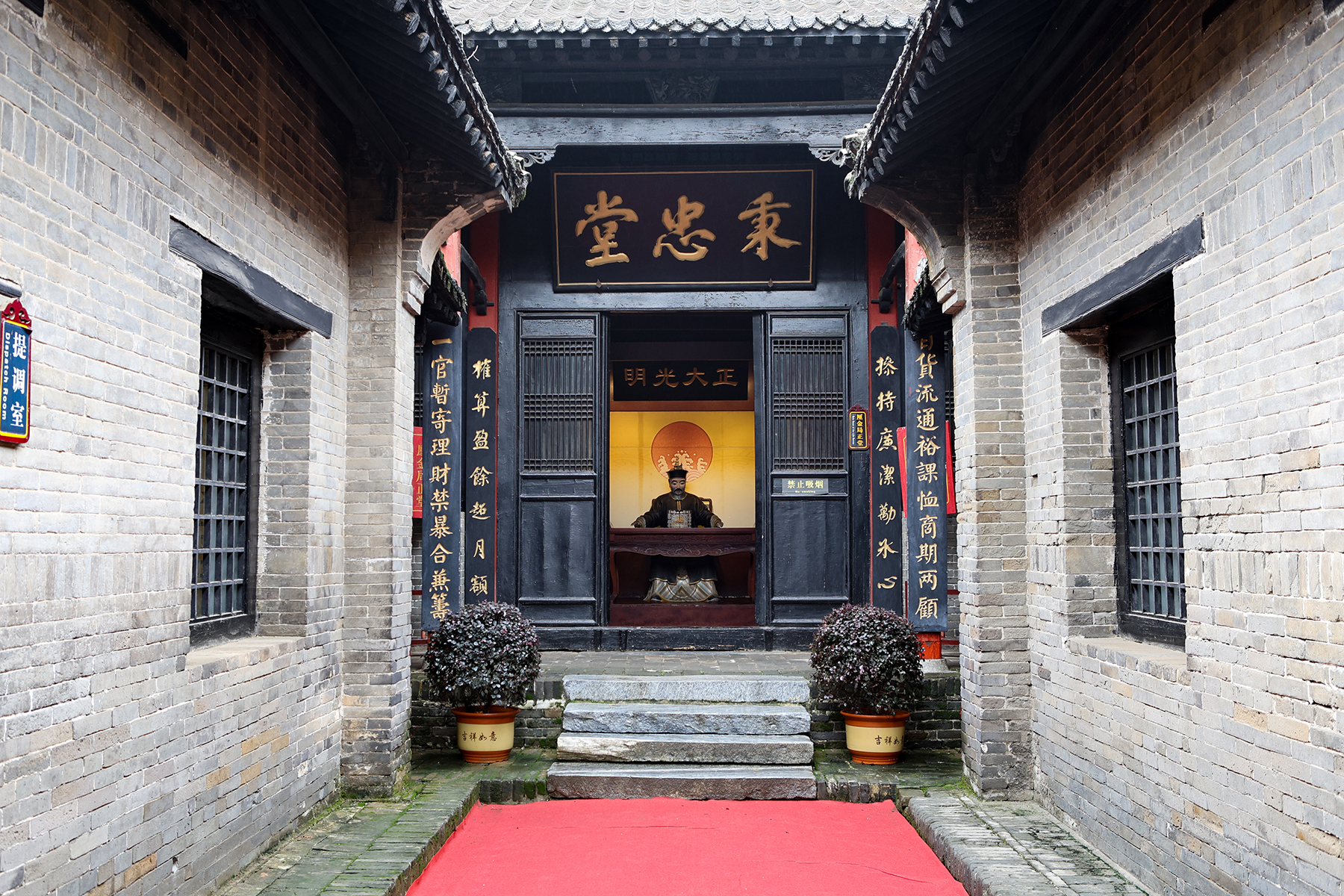
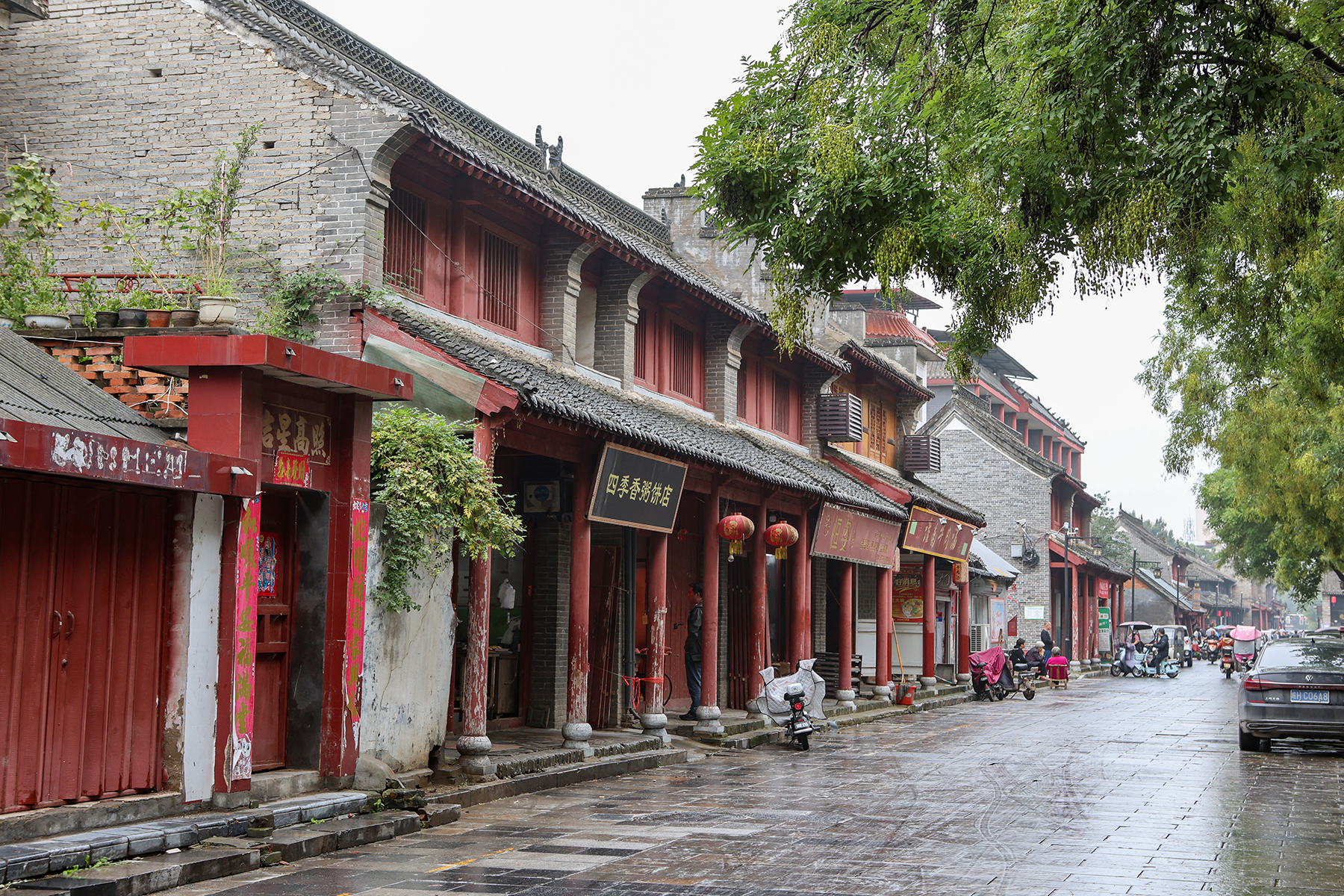
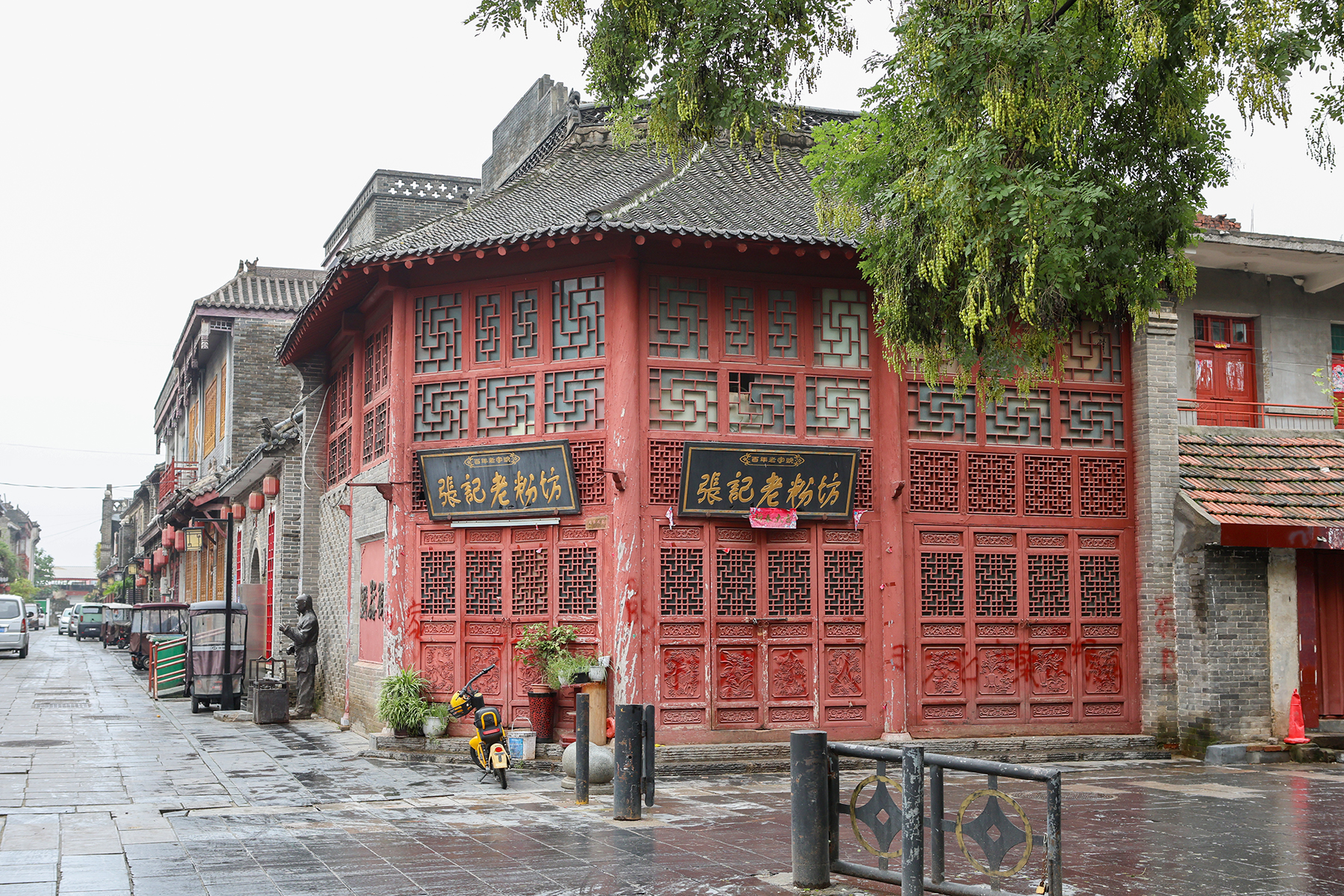
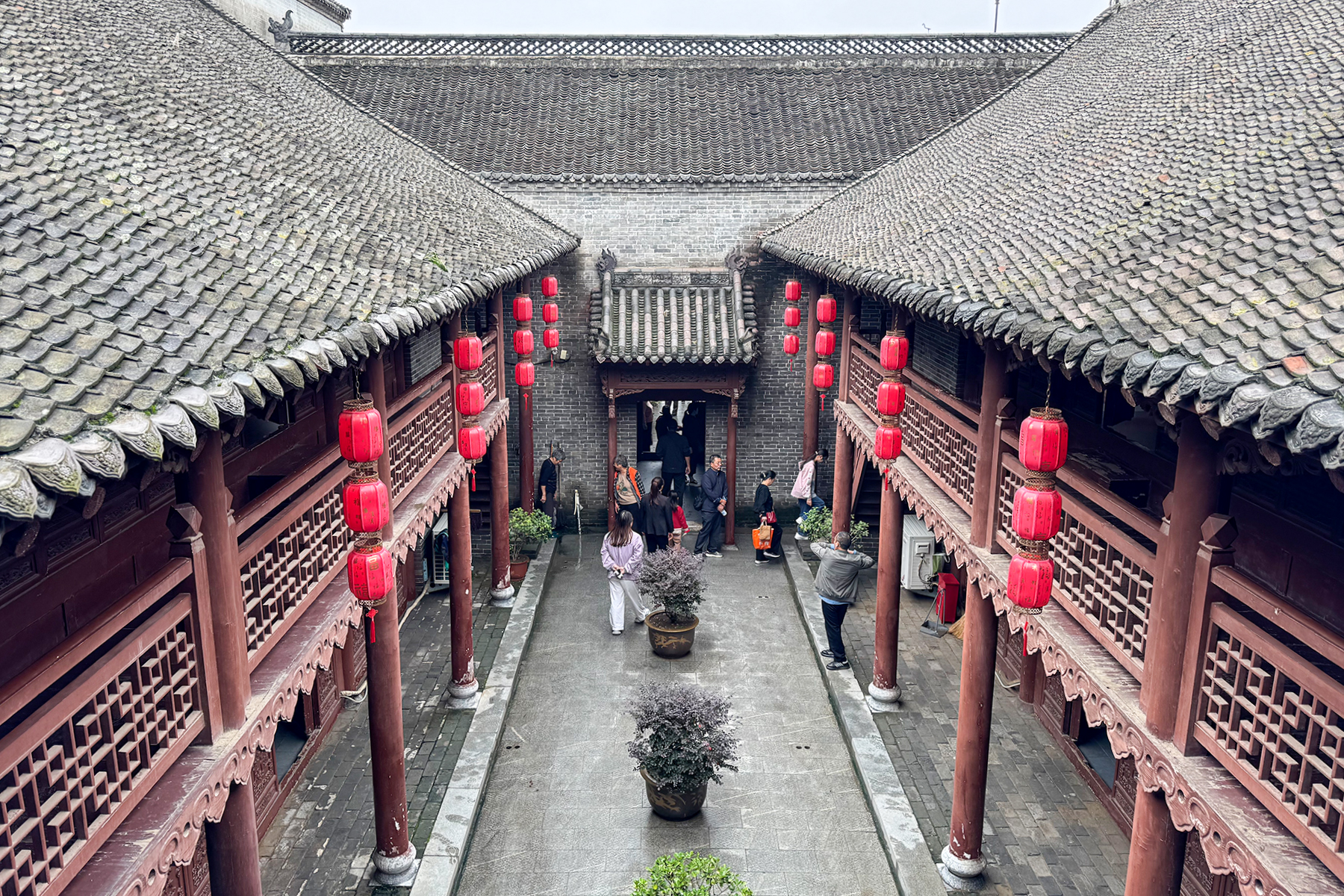
- Sheqi County.

- Location of the seat in Henan
- Coordinates: 33°03′22″N 112°56′53″E
- Country: People's Republic of China
- Province: Henan
- Prefecture-level city: Nanyang

Area
  - Total: 1,203 km^{2} (464 sq mi)

Population (2019)
  - Total: 636,900
  - Density: 529.4/km^{2} (1,371/sq mi)
- Time zone: UTC+8 (China Standard)
- Postal code: 473300
- Area code: 0377

Sheqi County (Chinese: 社旗县; pinyin: Shèqí Xiàn) is a county in the southwest of Henan province, China. It is under the administration of the prefecture-level city of Nanyang, and has an area of 1,203 km^{2} (464 sq mi) and a population of 630,000 as of 2002.

== Administrative divisions ==
As of 2012, this county is divided to 12 towns and 3 townships.

Towns

- Sheqi Town (社旗镇)
- Qiaotou (桥头镇)
- Raoliang (饶良镇)
- Xinglong (兴隆镇)
- Jinzhuang (晋庄镇)
- Lidian (李店镇)
- Miaodian (苗店镇)
- Haozhai (郝寨镇)
- Zhuji (朱集镇)
- Xiawa (下洼镇)
- Taihe (太和镇)
- Dafengying (大冯营镇)

Townships

- Chengjiao Township (城郊乡)
- Mopi Township (陌陂乡)
- Tangzhuang Township (唐庄乡)

== Climate ==
Climate data for Sheqi, elevation 117 m (384 ft), (1991–2020 normals, extremes 1981–2010)
Month	Jan	Feb	Mar	Apr	May	Jun	Jul	Aug	Sep	Oct	Nov	Dec	Year
Record high °C (°F)	19.7 (67.5)	22.9 (73.2)	29.3 (84.7)	33.0 (91.4)	39.1 (102.4)	39.7 (103.5)	40.5 (104.9)	39.2 (102.6)	39.0 (102.2)	33.0 (91.4)	27.1 (80.8)	19.9 (67.8)	40.5 (104.9)
Mean daily maximum °C (°F)	6.6 (43.9)	10.2 (50.4)	15.4 (59.7)	21.8 (71.2)	27.4 (81.3)	31.5 (88.7)	31.9 (89.4)	30.7 (87.3)	27.1 (80.8)	22.2 (72.0)	14.9 (58.8)	8.7 (47.7)	20.7 (69.3)
Daily mean °C (°F)	1.1 (34.0)	4.2 (39.6)	9.4 (48.9)	15.5 (59.9)	21.2 (70.2)	25.8 (78.4)	27.3 (81.1)	26.0 (78.8)	21.5 (70.7)	16.1 (61.0)	9.1 (48.4)	3.0 (37.4)	15.0 (59.0)
Mean daily minimum °C (°F)	−3.2 (26.2)	−0.6 (30.9)	4.1 (39.4)	9.6 (49.3)	15.2 (59.4)	20.5 (68.9)	23.4 (74.1)	22.2 (72.0)	17.2 (63.0)	11.2 (52.2)	4.5 (40.1)	−1.4 (29.5)	10.2 (50.4)
Record low °C (°F)	−13.4 (7.9)	−16.2 (2.8)	−9.3 (15.3)	−0.5 (31.1)	3.6 (38.5)	11.8 (53.2)	16.8 (62.2)	12.3 (54.1)	6.3 (43.3)	−1.2 (29.8)	−6.3 (20.7)	−19.3 (−2.7)	−19.3 (−2.7)
Average precipitation mm (inches)	10.5 (0.41)	13.0 (0.51)	32.6 (1.28)	47.7 (1.88)	81.7 (3.22)	129.1 (5.08)	182.1 (7.17)	151.0 (5.94)	76.6 (3.02)	48.3 (1.90)	32.1 (1.26)	11.5 (0.45)	816.2 (32.12)
Average precipitation days (≥ 0.1 mm)	4.3	5.4	6.7	7.4	8.3	9.1	11.8	11.2	9.0	7.8	6.3	4.3	91.6
Average snowy days	4.3	3.3	1.3	0	0	0	0	0	0	0	0.9	2.4	12.2
Average relative humidity (%)	69	68	70	72	70	70	81	83	78	73	74	71	73
Mean monthly sunshine hours	121.4	123.4	165.4	194.3	200.8	188.9	198.0	191.7	156.4	153.1	133.2	127.9	1,954.5
Percentage possible sunshine	38	39	44	50	47	44	46	47	43	44	43	41	44
Source: China Meteorological Administration
