= Particle physics =

Study of subatomic particles and forces

Particle physics or high-energy physics is the study of fundamental particles and forces that constitute matter and radiation. The field also studies combinations of elementary particles up to the scale of protons and neutrons, while the study of combinations of protons and neutrons is called nuclear physics.

The fundamental particles in the universe are classified in the Standard Model as fermions (matter particles) and bosons (force-carrying particles). There are three generations of fermions, although ordinary matter is made only from the first fermion generation. The first generation consists of up and down quarks which form protons and neutrons, and electrons and electron neutrinos. The three fundamental interactions known to be mediated by bosons are electromagnetism, the weak interaction, and the strong interaction.

Quarks form hadrons, but cannot exist on their own. Hadrons that contain an odd number of quarks are called baryons and those that contain an even number are called mesons. Two baryons, the proton and the neutron, make up most of the mass of ordinary matter. Mesons are unstable and the longest-lived last for only a few hundredths of a microsecond. They occur after collisions between particles made of quarks, such as fast-moving protons and neutrons in cosmic rays. Mesons are also produced in cyclotrons or other particle accelerators.

Particles have corresponding antiparticles with the same mass but with opposite electric charges. For example, the antiparticle of the electron is the positron. The electron has a negative electric charge, the positron has a positive charge. These antiparticles can theoretically form a corresponding form of matter called antimatter. Some particles, such as the photon, are their own antiparticle.

These elementary particles are excitations of the quantum fields that also govern their interactions. The dominant theory explaining these fundamental particles and fields, along with their dynamics, is called the Standard Model. The reconciliation of gravity to the current particle physics theory is not solved; many theories have addressed this problem, such as loop quantum gravity, string theory and supersymmetry theory.

Experimental particle physics is the study of these particles in radioactive processes and in particle accelerators such as the Large Hadron Collider. Theoretical particle physics is the study of these particles in the context of cosmology and quantum theory. The two are closely interrelated: the Higgs boson was postulated theoretically before being confirmed by experiments.

== History ==
The Geiger–Marsden experiments observed that a small fraction of the alpha particles experienced strong deflection when being struck by the gold foil.

The idea that all matter is fundamentally composed of elementary particles dates from at least the 6th century BC. In the 19th century, John Dalton, through his work on stoichiometry, concluded that each element of nature was composed of a single, unique type of particle. The word atom, after the Greek word atomos meaning "indivisible", has since then denoted the smallest particle of a chemical element, but physicists later discovered that atoms are not, in fact, the fundamental particles of nature, but are conglomerates of even smaller particles, such as the electron. The early 20th century explorations of nuclear physics and quantum physics led to proofs of nuclear fission in 1939 by Lise Meitner (based on experiments by Otto Hahn), and nuclear fusion by Hans Bethe in that same year; both discoveries also led to the development of nuclear weapons. Bethe's 1947 calculation of the Lamb shift is credited with having "opened the way to the modern era of particle physics".

Throughout the 1950s and 1960s, a bewildering variety of particles was found in collisions of particles from beams of increasingly high energy. It was referred to informally as the particle zoo. Important discoveries such as the CP violation by James Cronin and Val Fitch brought new questions to matter-antimatter imbalance. After the formulation of the Standard Model during the 1970s, physicists clarified the origin of the particle zoo. The large number of particles was explained as combinations of a (relatively) small number of more fundamental particles and framed in the context of quantum field theories. This reclassification marked the beginning of modern particle physics.

== Standard Model ==
The current state of the classification of all elementary particles is explained by the Standard Model, which gained widespread acceptance in the mid-1970s after experimental confirmation of the existence of quarks. It describes the strong, weak, and electromagnetic fundamental interactions, using mediating gauge bosons. The species of gauge bosons are eight gluons, W^{−}, W^{+} and Z bosons, and the photon. The Standard Model also contains 24 fundamental fermions (12 particles and their associated anti-particles), which are the constituents of all matter. Finally, the Standard Model also predicted the existence of a type of boson known as the Higgs boson. On 4 July 2012, physicists with the Large Hadron Collider at CERN announced they had found a new particle that behaves similarly to what is expected from the Higgs boson.

The Standard Model, as currently formulated, has 61 elementary particles. Those elementary particles can combine to form composite particles, accounting for the hundreds of other species of particles that have been discovered since the 1960s. The Standard Model has been found to agree with almost all the experimental tests conducted to date. However, most particle physicists believe that it is an incomplete description of nature and that a more fundamental theory awaits discovery (See Theory of Everything). In recent years, measurements of neutrino mass have provided the first experimental deviations from the Standard Model, since neutrinos do not have mass in the Standard Model.

== Subatomic particles ==
Modern particle physics research is focused on subatomic particles, including atomic constituents, such as electrons, protons, and neutrons (protons and neutrons are composite particles called baryons, made of quarks), that are produced by radioactive and scattering processes; such particles are photons, neutrinos, and muons, as well as a wide range of exotic particles. All particles and their interactions observed to date can be described almost entirely by the Standard Model.

Elementary Particles
	Types	Generations	Antiparticle	Colours	Total
Quarks	2	3	Pair	3	36
Leptons	2	3	Pair	None	12
Gluons	1	None	Own	8	8
Photon	1	None	Own	None	1
Z Boson	1	None	Own	None	1
W Boson	1	None	Pair	None	2
Higgs	1	None	Own	None	1
Total number of (known) elementary particles:					61

Dynamics of particles are also governed by quantum mechanics; they exhibit wave–particle duality, displaying particle-like behaviour under certain experimental conditions and wave-like behaviour in others. In more technical terms, they are described by quantum state vectors in a Hilbert space, which is also treated in quantum field theory. Following the convention of particle physicists, the term elementary particles is applied to those particles that are, according to current understanding, presumed to be indivisible and not composed of other particles.

=== Quarks and leptons ===
A Feynman diagram of the β^{−} decay, showing a neutron (n, udd) converted into a proton (p, udu). "u" and "d" are the up and down quarks, "e^{−}" is the electron, and "ν̅_{e}" is the electron antineutrino.

Ordinary matter is made from first-generation quarks (up, down) and leptons (electron, electron neutrino). Collectively, quarks and leptons are called fermions. They have a quantum spin of half-integers (−1/2, 1/2, 3/2, etc.) and obey the Pauli exclusion principle, where no two particles may occupy the same quantum state. Quarks have fractional elementary electric charge (−1/3 or 2/3) and leptons have whole-numbered electric charge (0 or -1). Quarks also have color charge, which is labeled arbitrarily with no correlation to actual light color as red, green and blue. Because the interactions between the quarks store energy which can convert to other particles when the quarks are far apart enough, quarks cannot be observed independently. This is called color confinement.

There are three known generations of quarks (up and down, strange and charm, top and bottom) and leptons (electron and its neutrino, muon and its neutrino, tau and its neutrino), with strong indirect evidence that a fourth generation of fermions does not exist.

=== Bosons ===
Bosons are the mediators or carriers of fundamental interactions, such as electromagnetism, the weak interaction, and the strong interaction. Electromagnetism is mediated by the photon, the quanta of light. The weak interaction is mediated by the W and Z bosons. The strong interaction is mediated by the gluon, which can link quarks together to form composite particles. Due to the aforementioned color confinement, gluons are never observed independently. The Higgs boson gives mass to the W and Z bosons via the Higgs mechanism – the gluon and photon are expected to be massless. All bosons have an integer quantum spin (0 and 1) and can have the same quantum state.

=== Antiparticles and color charge ===
Most aforementioned particles have corresponding antiparticles, which compose antimatter. Normal particles have positive lepton or baryon number, and antiparticles have these numbers negative. Most properties of corresponding antiparticles and particles are the same, with a few gets reversed; the electron's antiparticle, positron, has an opposite charge. To differentiate between antiparticles and particles, a plus or negative sign is added in superscript. For example, the electron and the positron are denoted e^{−} and e^{+}, respectively. However, in the case that the particle has a charge of 0 (equal to that of the antiparticle), the antiparticle is denoted with a line above the symbol. As such, an electron neutrino is ν_{e}, whereas its antineutrino is ν̅_{e}. When a particle and an antiparticle interact with each other, they are annihilated and convert to other particles. Some particles, such as the photon or gluon, have no antiparticles.

Quarks and gluons additionally have color charges, which influences the strong interaction. A quark's color charges are called red, green and blue (though the particle itself has no physical color), and in antiquarks are called antired, antigreen and antiblue. The gluon can have eight color charges, which are the result of quarks' interactions to form composite particles (gauge symmetry SU(3)).

=== Composite ===
A proton consists of two up quarks and one down quark, linked together by gluons. The quarks' color charge are also visible.

The neutrons and protons in the atomic nuclei are baryons – the neutron is composed of two down quarks and one up quark, and the proton is composed of two up quarks and one down quark. A baryon is composed of three quarks, and a meson is composed of two quarks (one normal, one anti). Baryons and mesons are collectively called hadrons. Quarks inside hadrons are governed by the strong interaction, thus are subjected to quantum chromodynamics (color charges). The bounded quarks must have their color charge to be neutral, or "white" for analogy with mixing the primary colors. More exotic hadrons can have other types, arrangement or number of quarks (tetraquark, pentaquark).

An atom is made from protons, neutrons and electrons. By modifying the particles inside a normal atom, exotic atoms can be formed. A simple example would be the hydrogen-4.1, which has one of its electrons replaced with a muon.

=== Hypothetical ===
The graviton is a hypothetical particle that can mediate the gravitational interaction, but it has not been detected or completely reconciled with current theories. Many other hypothetical particles have been proposed to address the limitations of the Standard Model. Notably, supersymmetric particles aim to solve the hierarchy problem, axions address the strong CP problem, and various other particles are proposed to explain the origins of dark matter and dark energy.

== Experimental laboratories ==
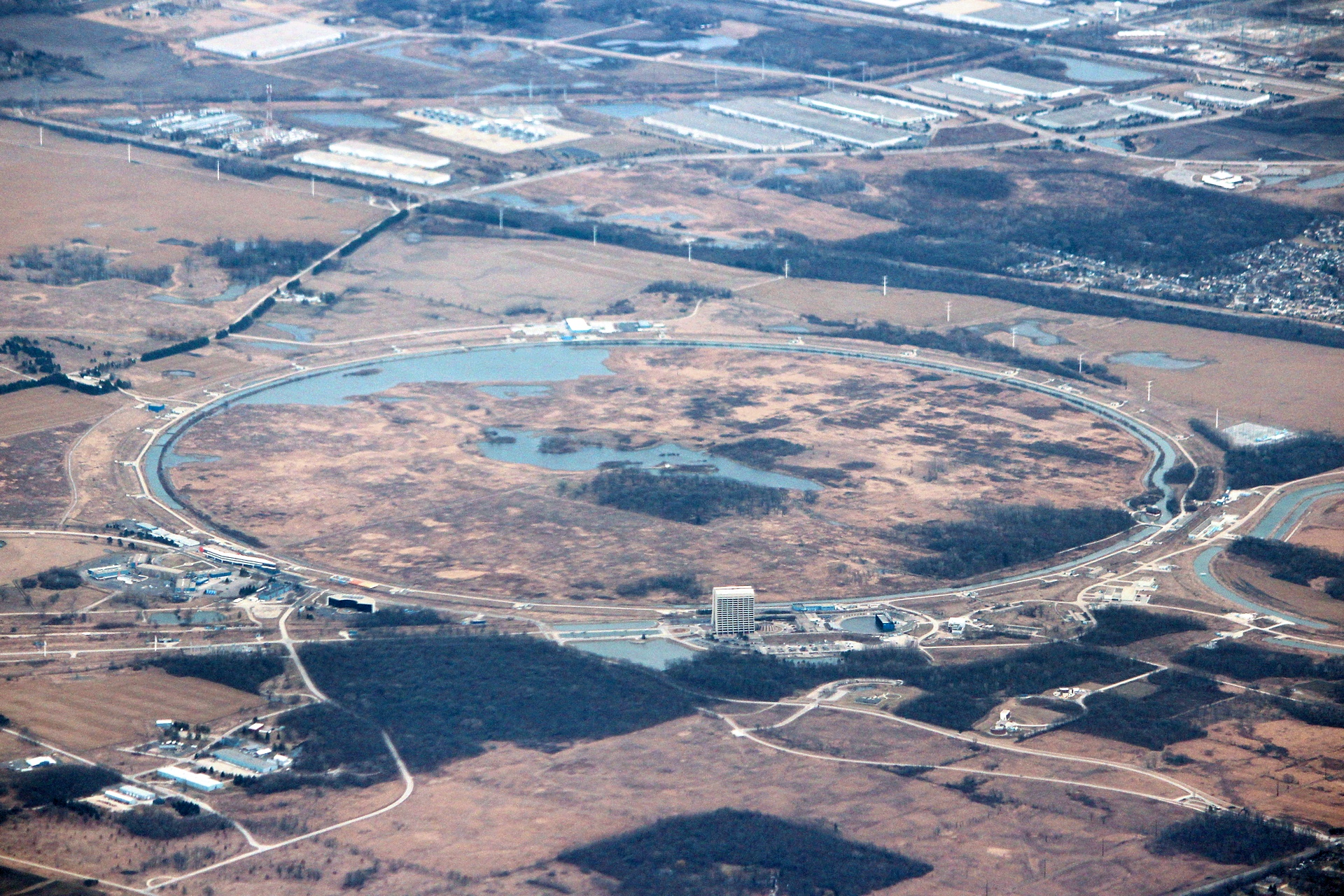
Fermi National Accelerator Laboratory, USA

The world's major particle physics laboratories are:

- Brookhaven National Laboratory (Long Island, New York, United States). Its main facility is the Relativistic Heavy Ion Collider (RHIC), which collides heavy ions such as gold ions and polarized protons. It is the world's first heavy ion collider, and the world's only polarized proton collider.
- Budker Institute of Nuclear Physics (Novosibirsk, Russia). Its main projects are now the electron-positron colliders VEPP-2000, operated since 2006, and VEPP-4, started experiments in 1994. Earlier facilities include the first electron–electron beam–beam collider VEP-1, which conducted experiments from 1964 to 1968; the electron-positron colliders VEPP-2, operated from 1965 to 1974; and, its successor VEPP-2M, performed experiments from 1974 to 2000.
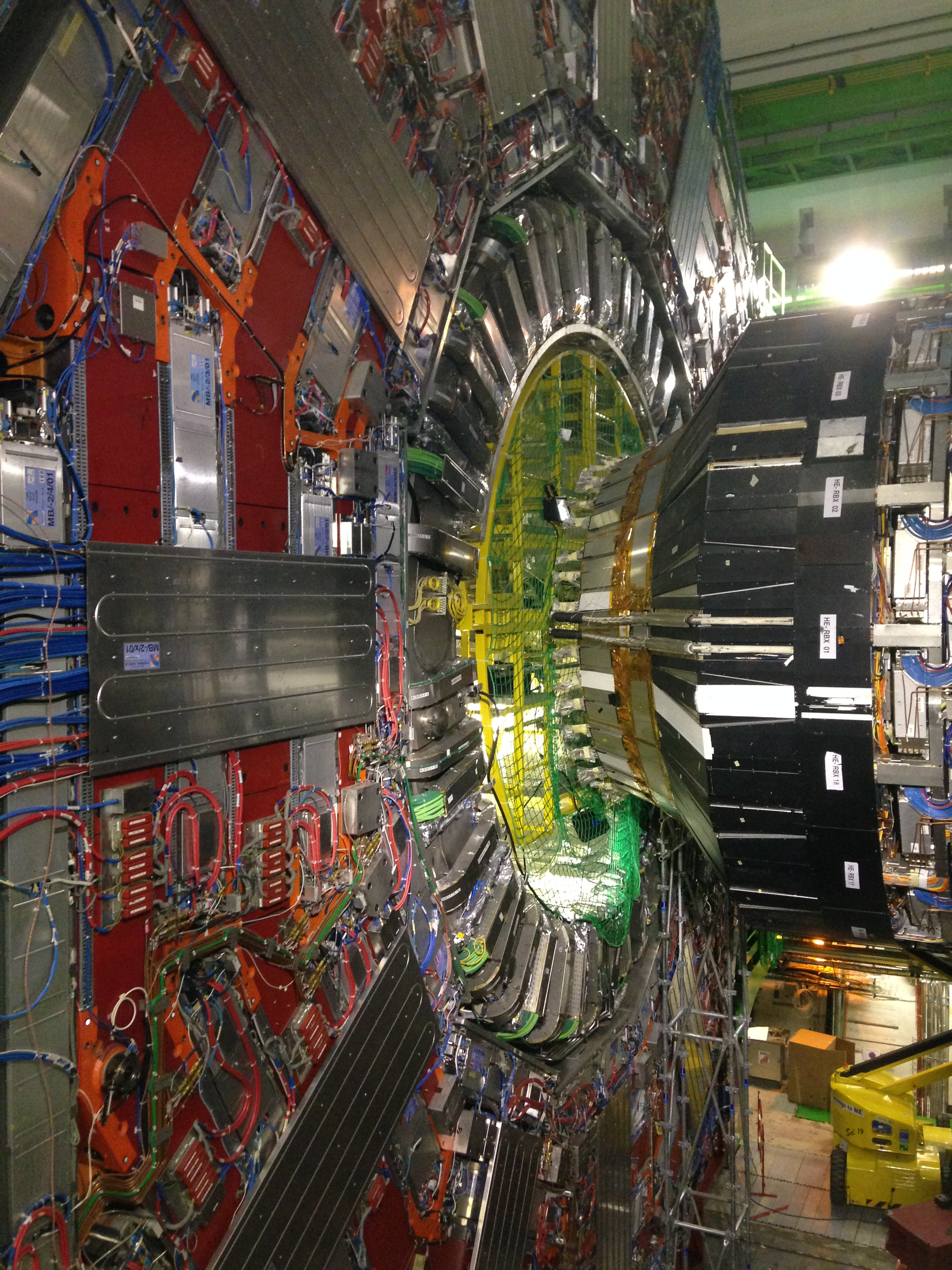
- CMS detector for LHC
  CERN (European Organization for Nuclear Research) (Franco-Swiss border, near Geneva, Switzerland). Its main project is now the Large Hadron Collider (LHC), which had its first beam circulation on 10 September 2008, and is now the world's most energetic collider of protons. It also became the most energetic collider of heavy ions after it began colliding lead ions. Earlier facilities include the Large Electron–Positron Collider (LEP), which was stopped on 2 November 2000 and then dismantled to give way for LHC; and the Super Proton Synchrotron, which is being reused as a pre-accelerator for the LHC and for fixed-target experiments.
- DESY (Deutsches Elektronen-Synchrotron) (Hamburg, Germany). Its main facility was the Hadron Elektron Ring Anlage (HERA), which collided electrons and positrons with protons. The accelerator complex is now focused on the production of synchrotron radiation with PETRA III, FLASH and the European XFEL.
- Fermi National Accelerator Laboratory (Fermilab) (Batavia, Illinois, United States). Its main facility until 2011 was the Tevatron, which collided protons and antiprotons and was the highest-energy particle collider on earth until the Large Hadron Collider surpassed it on 29 November 2009.
- Institute of High Energy Physics (IHEP) (Beijing, China). IHEP manages a number of China's major particle physics facilities, including the Beijing Electron–Positron Collider II(BEPC II), the Beijing Spectrometer (BES), the Beijing Synchrotron Radiation Facility (BSRF), the International Cosmic-Ray Observatory at Yangbajing in Tibet, the Daya Bay Reactor Neutrino Experiment, the China Spallation Neutron Source, the Hard X-ray Modulation Telescope (HXMT), and the Accelerator-driven Sub-critical System (ADS) as well as the Jiangmen Underground Neutrino Observatory (JUNO).
- KEK (Tsukuba, Japan). It is the home of a number of experiments such as the K2K experiment and its successor T2K experiment, a neutrino oscillation experiment and Belle II, an experiment measuring the CP violation of B mesons.
- SLAC National Accelerator Laboratory (Menlo Park, California, United States). Its 2-mile-long linear particle accelerator began operating in 1962 and was the basis for numerous electron and positron collision experiments until 2008. Since then the linear accelerator is being used for the Linac Coherent Light Source X-ray laser as well as advanced accelerator design research. SLAC staff continue to participate in developing and building many particle detectors around the world.

== Theory ==
As with theoretical physics, theoretical particle physics attempts to develop the models, theoretical framework, and mathematical tools to understand current experiments and make predictions for future experiments. There are several major interrelated efforts being made in theoretical particle physics today.

One important branch attempts to better understand the Standard Model and its tests. Theorists make quantitative predictions of observables at collider and astronomical experiments, which along with experimental measurements is used to extract the parameters of the Standard Model with less uncertainty. This work probes the limits of the Standard Model and therefore expands scientific understanding of nature's building blocks. Those efforts are made challenging by the difficulty of calculating high precision quantities in quantum chromodynamics. Some theorists working in this area use the tools of perturbative quantum field theory and effective field theory, referring to themselves as phenomenologists. Others make use of lattice field theory and call themselves lattice theorists.

Another major effort is in model building where model builders develop ideas for what physics may lie beyond the Standard Model (at higher energies or smaller distances). This work is often motivated by the hierarchy problem and is constrained by existing experimental data. It may involve work on supersymmetry, alternatives to the Higgs mechanism, extra spatial dimensions (such as the Randall–Sundrum models), Preon theory, combinations of these, or other ideas. Vanishing-dimensions theory is a particle physics theory suggesting that systems with higher energy have a smaller number of dimensions.

A third major effort in theoretical particle physics is string theory. String theorists attempt to construct a unified description of quantum mechanics and general relativity by building a theory based on small strings, and branes rather than particles. If the theory is successful, it may be considered a "Theory of Everything", or "TOE".

There are other areas of work in theoretical particle physics ranging from particle cosmology to loop quantum gravity.

== Practical applications ==
In principle, all physics (and practical applications developed therefrom) can be derived from the study of fundamental particles. In practice, even if "particle physics" is taken to mean only "high-energy atom smashers", many technologies have been developed during these pioneering investigations that later find wide uses in society. Particle accelerators are used to produce medical isotopes for research and treatment (for example, isotopes used in PET imaging), or used directly in external beam radiotherapy. The development of superconductors has been pushed forward by their use in particle physics. The World Wide Web and touchscreen technology were initially developed at CERN. Additional applications are found in medicine, national security, industry, computing, science, and workforce development, illustrating a long and growing list of beneficial practical applications with contributions from particle physics.

== Future ==
Major efforts to look for physics beyond the Standard Model include the Future Circular Collider proposed for CERN and the Particle Physics Project Prioritization Panel (P5) in the US that will update the 2014 P5 study that recommended the Deep Underground Neutrino Experiment, among other experiments.

== See also ==
- Atomic physics
- Astronomy
- Astroparticle physics
- Computational particle physics
- High pressure
- International Conference on High Energy Physics
- International Conference on Photonic, Electronic and Atomic Collisions
- Introduction to quantum mechanics
- Standard Model
- List of accelerators in particle physics
- List of particles
- Micro black hole
- Number theory
- Particle physics and representation theory
- Resonance (particle physics)
- Self-consistency principle in high energy physics
- Stanford Physics Information Retrieval System
- Timeline of particle physics
- Track significance
- Unparticle physics
