= Linear alkylbenzene =

Names
- Other names LAB, linear alkyl benzene

Identifiers
CAS Number	67774-74-7 (C10-13 alkyl)
ChemSpider	none
ECHA InfoCard	100.060.937
EC Number	267-051-0
CompTox Dashboard (EPA)	DTXSID3028340

Properties
Chemical formula	C_{6}H_{5}CHR^{1}R^{2} where R^{1} = C_{n}H_{2n+1} and R^{2} = C_{m}H_{2m+1} m,n are integers m≥0, n≥1 (typically 10-16)
Appearance	colorless liquid
Density	863 kg/m3
Solubility in water	insoluble in water

Hazards
- Occupational safety and health (OHS/OSH)
Main hazards	flammable
Safety data sheet (SDS)	MSDS
- Except where otherwise noted, data are given for materials in their standard state (at 25 °C [77 °F], 100 kPa). verify (what is ?) Infobox references

Linear alkylbenzenes (sometimes also known as LABs) are a family of organic compounds with the formula C_{6}H_{5}C_{n}H_{2n+1}. Typically, n lies between 10 and 16, although generally supplied as a tighter cut, such as C_{12}-C_{15}, C_{12}-C_{13} and C_{10}-C_{13}, for detergent use. The C_{n}H_{2n+1} chain is unbranched. They are mainly produced as intermediate in the production of surfactants, for use in detergent. Since the 1960s, LABs have emerged as the dominant precursor of biodegradable detergents.

== Production ==
Hydrotreated kerosene is a typical feedstock for high purity linear paraffins (n-paraffins), which are subsequently dehydrogenated to linear olefins:

C_{n}H_{2n+2} → C_{n}H_{2n} + H_{2}

Alternatively, ethylene can be oligomerized (partially polymerized) to produce linear alkenes. The resulting linear mono-olefins react with benzene in the presence of a catalyst to produce the LABs. Hydrogen fluoride (HF) and aluminium chloride (AlCl_{3}) are the two major catalysts for the alkylation of benzene with linear mono-olefins. The HF-based process is commercially dominant; however, the risk of releasing HF (a poisonous substance) into the environment became a concern particularly after the Clean Air Act Amendment. In 1995, a solid catalyst system (the DETAL process) became available. The process eliminates catalyst neutralization and HF disposal. Consequently, most LAB plants built since then have utilized this process.

=== Production details ===
Given the large scale applications of LAB-derived detergents, a variety routes have been developed to produce linear alkylbenzenes:

- The HF/n-paraffins process involving dehydrogenation of n-paraffins to olefins, and subsequent reaction with benzene using hydrogen fluoride as catalyst. This process accounts for the majority of the installed LAB production in the world. It includes a PACOL (paraffin conversion to olefins) stage where n-paraffins are converted to mono-olefins (typically internal mono-olefins), a DEFINE unit whose primary function is to convert residual diolefins to mono-olefins, a PEP unit which is essentially an aromatic removal unit - introduced before the alkylation step to improve LAB yield and quality, an alkylation step where mono-olefins, both internal and alpha olefins, are reacted with benzene to produce LAB in the presence of HF catalyst.
- The DETAL process involving dehydrogenation of n-paraffins to olefins, and subsequent reaction with benzene using a fixed bed catalyst. This is newer technology and has several of the stages depicted in the HF/n-paraffins process, but it is principally different in the benzene alkylation step, during which a solid-state catalyst is employed. There is a developing transalkylation (TA) stage to the Detal process wherein any higher alkylated benzenes (HAB) are contacted with additional benzene over a transalkylation catalyst.
- The Friedel-Crafts alkylation process involves chlorination of n-paraffins to monochloroparaffins followed by alkylation of benzene using aluminum chloride (AlCl_{3}) catalyst. This method is one of the oldest commercial routes to LABs.

Each process generates LAB products with distinct features. Important product characteristics include the bromine index, sulfonatability, amount of 2-phenyl isomers (2-phenylalkane), the tetralin content, amount of non-alkylbenzene components, and the linearity of the product.

The production of n-paraffins often occurs as part of an integrated LAB plant where the producers start from kerosene as raw material. The UOP process for producing normal paraffin includes a kerosene prefractionation unit, a hydrotreating unit and a Molex unit. The ExxonMobil Chemical technology includes a recovery process and can produce LAB grade n-paraffins from most medium to low sulfur kerosene without the use of a hydrotreater stage upstream. A desulfurization process is needed to reduce the sulfur content of some n-paraffins.

Farabi Petrochemicals, Nirma are one of the manufacturers commercially produce LAB in large scale.

== Applications ==
Linear alkylbenzene is sulfonated to produce linear alkylbenzene sulfonate (LAS), a biodegradable surfactant. LAS replaced branched dodecylbenzene sulfonates, which were phased out because they biodegrade more slowly.

=== Niche uses ===
LAB was identified as a promising liquid scintillator by the SNO+ neutrino detector due to its good optical transparency (≈20 m), high light yield, low amount of radioactive impurities, and its high flash point (140 °C) which makes safe handling easier. It is also available in large volumes at a relatively low cost at the SNO+ site. It is now used in several other neutrino detectors, such as the RENO and Daya Bay Reactor Neutrino Experiments. The material performs well in deep underwater environments. One study suggested LAB as a suitable material to be employed in a Secret Neutrino Interactions Finder (SNIF), a type of antineutrino detector designed to detect the presence of nuclear reactors at distances of between 100 and 500 km.

== Environmental considerations ==
LAB has been subject to concern about its effect on the environment and human health. European Council Regulation (EC) 1488/94 led to it being extensively evaluated. The life-cycle analysis considered the emissions and resulting environmental and human exposures. Following the exposure assessment, the environmental risk characterization for each protection target in the aquatic, terrestrial and soil compartment was determined. For human health the scenarios for occupational exposure, consumer exposure and human exposure indirectly via the environment have been examined and the possible risks identified.

The report concludes that there are no concerns for the environment or human health. There is no need for further testing or risk reduction measures beyond those currently practiced. LAB was therefore de-classified and was removed from Annex 1 in the 28th ATP (Directive 2001/59).
