= Lu Ke =

Chinese material scientist

- Born: May 23, 1965 (age 61); Huachi County, Gansu, China
- Education: East China Institute of Technology; Institute of Metals Research of the Chinese Academy of Science
- Awards: First class natural science prize of CAS
- Scientific career
- Fields: Material science
- Workplaces: Institute of Metals Research of the Chinese Academy of Sciences

Lu Ke (Chinese: 卢柯; born 23 May 1965) is a Chinese materials scientist. He was born in Huachi County, Gansu, and received his bachelor's degree at East China Institute of Technology. In January 1990, he received a doctor's degree at the Institute of Metals Research of the Chinese Academy of Sciences, and became a researcher there 3 years later. In 1993, he was awarded first class natural science prize of the CAS. In 2003, he was elected to the Chinese Academy of Sciences at the age of 38, making him one of the youngest academicians in the history of the CAS. He is mainly known for his work in the field of crystallization of amorphous metals. In 2021, he became a laureate of the Asian Scientist 100 by the Asian Scientist.

He is also involved in politics and has been a vice chair of the central committee of the Jiusan Society since 2012. He currently serves as a vice chair of the Liaoning committee of the Chinese People's Political Consultative Conference (CPPCC). Lu was previously a delegate to the 13th National Committee of the CPPCC and a vice-governor of Liaoning province from 2018 to 2023.
