= Institute of High Energy Physics =

Chinese Government Agency

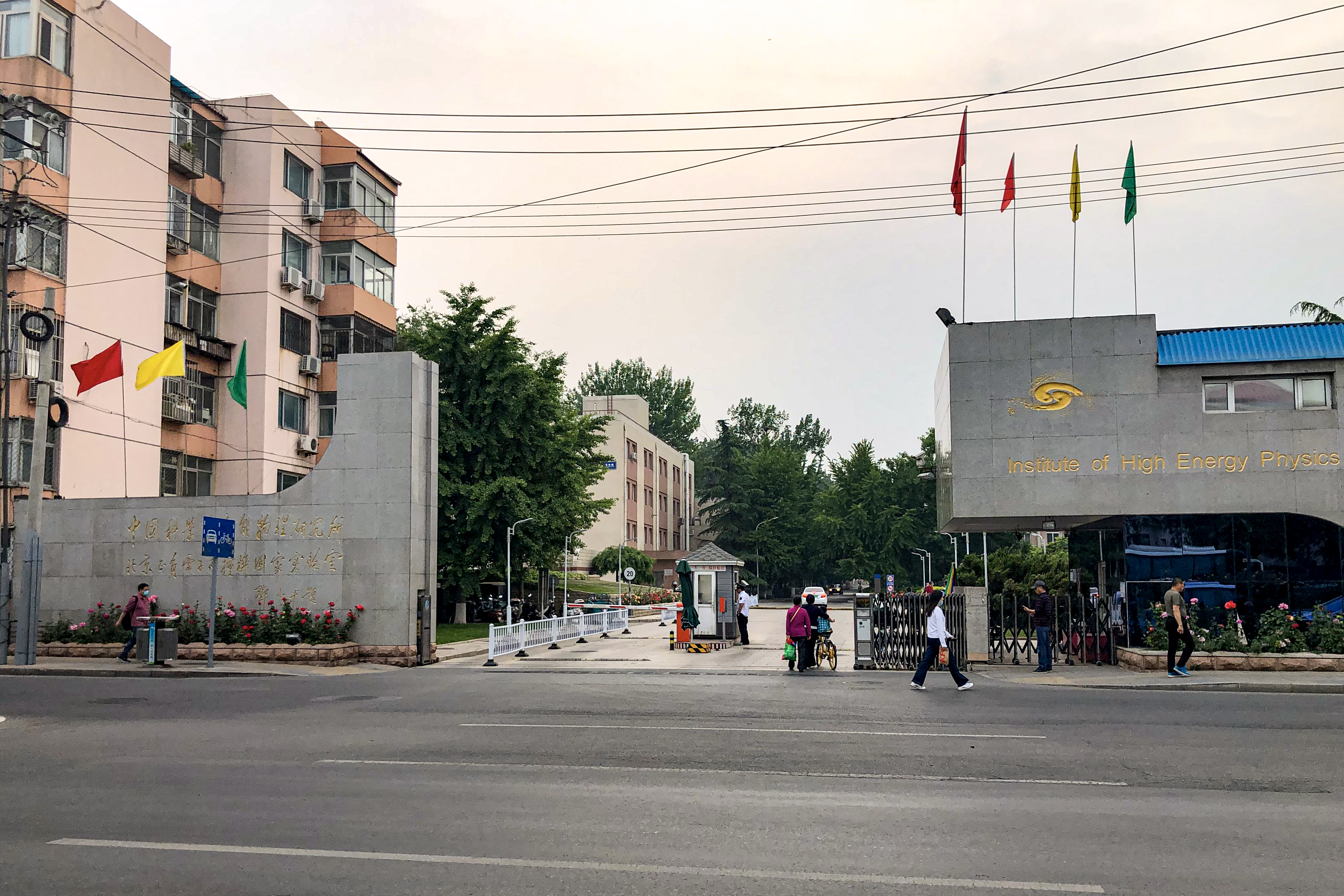
Gate of the IHEP

The Institute of High Energy Physics of the Chinese Academy of Sciences (IHEP) (Chinese: 中国科学院高能物理研究所) is the largest and most comprehensive fundamental research center of high-energy physics in China. It is located in Shijingshan District, Beijing and administered by the Chinese Academy of Sciences. The major research fields of IHEP are particle physics, astrophysics and astroparticle physics, accelerator physics and technologies, radiation technologies, and their applications.

The institute co-publishes the journal, Radiation Detection Technology and Methods.

== Related ==
- Ali CMB Polarization Telescope (AliCPT)
- Beijing Electron-Positron Collider (BEPC and BEPCII)
- Beijing Proton Linac (BPL)
- Beijing Spectrometer III (BES III)
- Beijing Synchrotron Radiation Facility
- Beijing Test Beam Facility
- China Spallation Neutron Source
- Dark Matter Particle Explorer (DAMPE)
- Daya Bay Reactor Neutrino Experiment
- Hard X-ray Modulation Telescope (HXMT)
- High Energy cosmic Radiation Detector facility (HERD)
- Jiangmen Underground Neutrino Observatory (JUNO)
- Large High Altitude Air Shower Observatory (LHAASO)
- POLAR instrument onboard Tiangong-2
- Yangbajing International Cosmic Ray Observatory (YBJ)
- Yutu (rover); IHEP built its alpha particle X-ray spectrometer
