= Daya Bay Reactor Neutrino Experiment =

Particle physics experiment studying neutrinos

Coordinates: 22.5953°N 114.5431°E

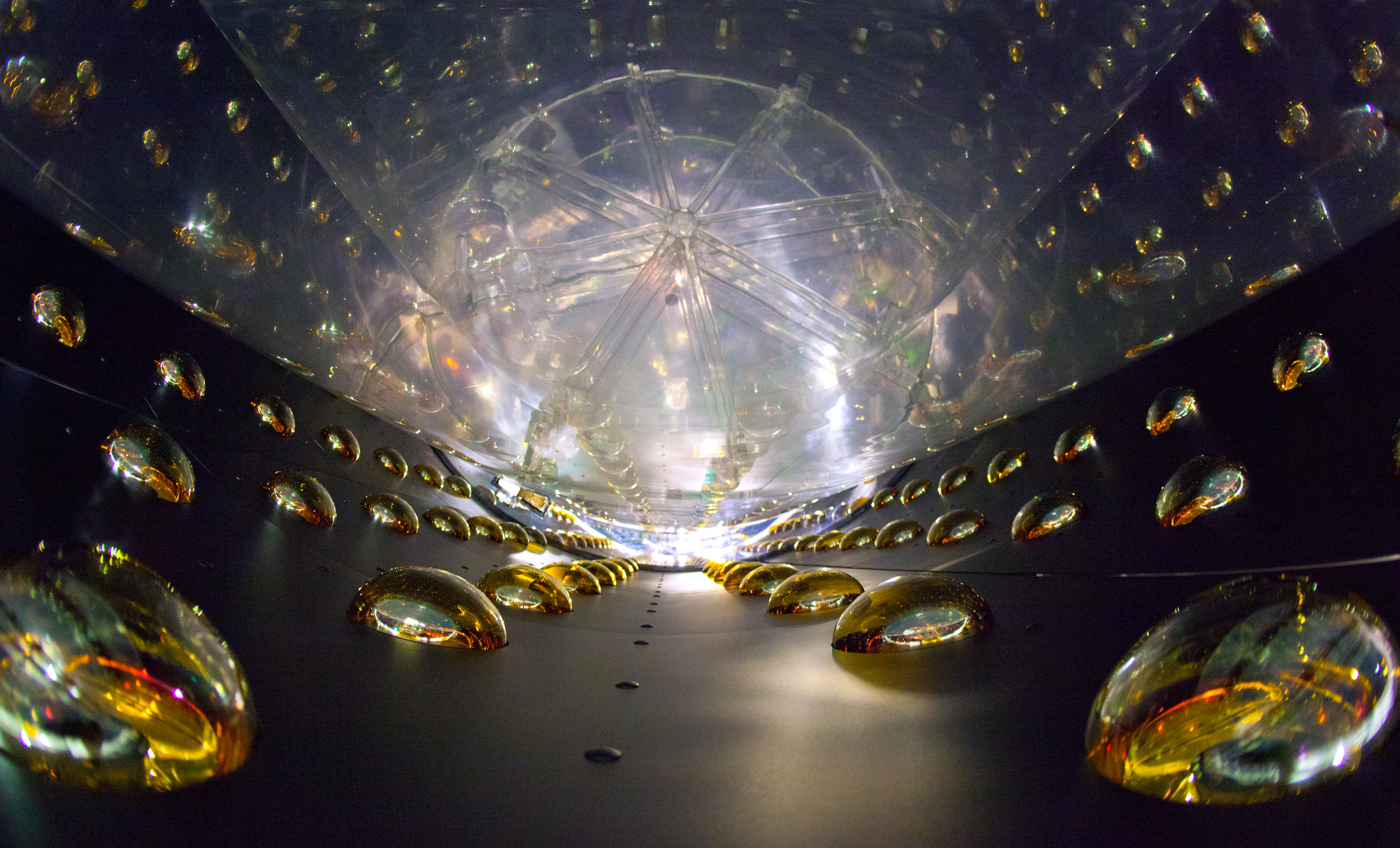
One of the Daya Bay detectors.

The Daya Bay Reactor Neutrino Experiment was a China-based multinational particle physics project studying neutrinos, in particular neutrino oscillations. The experiment operated in 2011–2020. The multinational collaboration includes researchers from China, Chile, the United States, Taiwan (Republic of China), Russia, and the Czech Republic. The US side of the project is funded by the US Department of Energy's Office of High Energy Physics.

The experiment was situated at Daya Bay, approximately 52 kilometers northeast of Hong Kong and 45 kilometers east of Shenzhen. There was an affiliated project in the Aberdeen Tunnel Underground Laboratory in Hong Kong. The Aberdeen lab measured the neutrons produced by cosmic muons which may affect the Daya Bay Reactor Neutrino Experiment.

The experiment consisted of eight antineutrino detectors, clustered in three locations within 1.9 km (1.2 mi) of six nuclear reactors. Each detector consisted of 20 tons of liquid scintillator (linear alkylbenzene doped with gadolinium) surrounded by photomultiplier tubes and shielding.

A much larger follow-up is the Jiangmen Underground Neutrino Observatory (JUNO) in Kaiping, which uses an acrylic sphere filled with 20,000 tons of liquid scintillator to detect reactor antineutrinos. The experiment started data collection in 2025.

== Neutrino oscillations ==
The experiment studied neutrino oscillations and was designed to measure the mixing angle θ_{13} using antineutrinos produced by the reactors of the Daya Bay Nuclear Power Plant and the Ling Ao Nuclear Power Plant. Scientists were also interested in whether neutrinos violate Charge-Parity conservation.

On 8 March 2012, the Daya Bay collaboration announced a 5.2σ discovery of θ_{13} ≠ 0, with

$$\sin^2 (2\ \theta_{13}) = 0.092 \pm 0.016 \, \mathrm{(stat)} \pm 0.005\, \mathrm{(syst)}.$$

This significant result represents a new type of oscillation and is surprisingly large. It is consistent with earlier, less significant results by T2K, MINOS and Double Chooz. With θ_{13} so large, NOνA has about a 50% probability of being sensitive to the neutrino mass hierarchy. Experiments may also be able to probe CP violation among neutrinos.

The collaboration produced an updated analysis of their results in 2014, which used the energy spectrum to improve the bounds on the mixing angle:

$$\sin^2 (2\ \theta_{13}) = 0.090^{+0.008}_{-0.009}$$

An independent measurement was also published using events from neutrons captured on hydrogen:

$$\sin^2 (2\ \theta_{13}) = 0.083 \pm 0.018$$.

Daya Bay has used its data to search for signals of a light sterile neutrino, resulting in exclusions of some previous unexplored mass regions.

At the Moriond 2015 physics conference a new best fit for mixing angle and mass difference was presented:

$$\sin^2(2\ \theta_{13}) = 0.084 \pm 0.005, \qquad |\Delta m^2_{ee}| = 2.44^{+0.10}_{-0.11} \times 10^{-3} {\rm eV}^2$$

On 21 April 2023 (published), Daya Bay's reports the following precision measurements:

$\sin^2(2\ \theta_{13}) = 0.0851 \pm 0.0024,\qquad \Delta m^2_{32} = (2.466 \pm 0.060) \times 10^{-3} {\rm eV}^2$ for the normal mass ordering or $\Delta m^2_{32} = -(2.571\pm 0.060)\times 10^{-3} {\rm eV}^2$, for the inverted mass ordering. The Daya Bay collaboration suggests, "The reported $\sin^2(2\ \theta_{13})$ will likely remain the most precise measurement of $\theta_{13}$ in the foreseeable future and be crucial to the investigation of the mass hierarchy and CP violation in neutrino oscillation."

== Antineutrino spectrum ==
Daya Bay Collaboration measured the anti-neutrino energy spectrum, and found that anti-neutrinos at an energy of around 5 MeV are in excess relative to theoretical expectations. This unexpected disagreement between observation and predictions suggested that the Standard Model of particle physics needs improvement.

== See also ==
- Neutrino
- Sterile neutrino
- Weak interaction

== Collaborators ==
- Beijing Normal University
- Brookhaven National Laboratory
- Catholic University of Chile
- California Institute of Technology
- Charles University
- Chengdu University of Technology
- China Guangdong Nuclear Power Group
- China Institute of Atomic Energy
- Chinese Academy of Sciences
- Chinese University of Hong Kong
- College of William and Mary
- Dongguan Institute of Technology
- Illinois Institute of Technology
- Institute of High Energy Physics
- Iowa State University
- Joint Institute for Nuclear Research
- Kurchatov Institute
- Lawrence Berkeley National Laboratory and University of California, Berkeley
- Nanjing University
- Nankai University
- National Chiao-Tung University
- National Taiwan University
- National United University
- Princeton University
- Rensselaer Polytechnic Institute
- Shandong University
- Shanghai Jiao Tong University
- Shenzhen University
- Siena College
- Sun Yat-Sen (Zhongshan) University
- Temple University
- Tsinghua University
- University of California, Irvine
- University of California, Los Angeles
- University of Hong Kong
- University of Houston
- University of Illinois Urbana-Champaign
- University of Science and Technology of China
- University of Wisconsin
- Yale University
- Virginia Polytechnic Institute and State University
