= Dalian Institute of Chemical Physics =

Chinese research institute

- 大连化学物理研究所

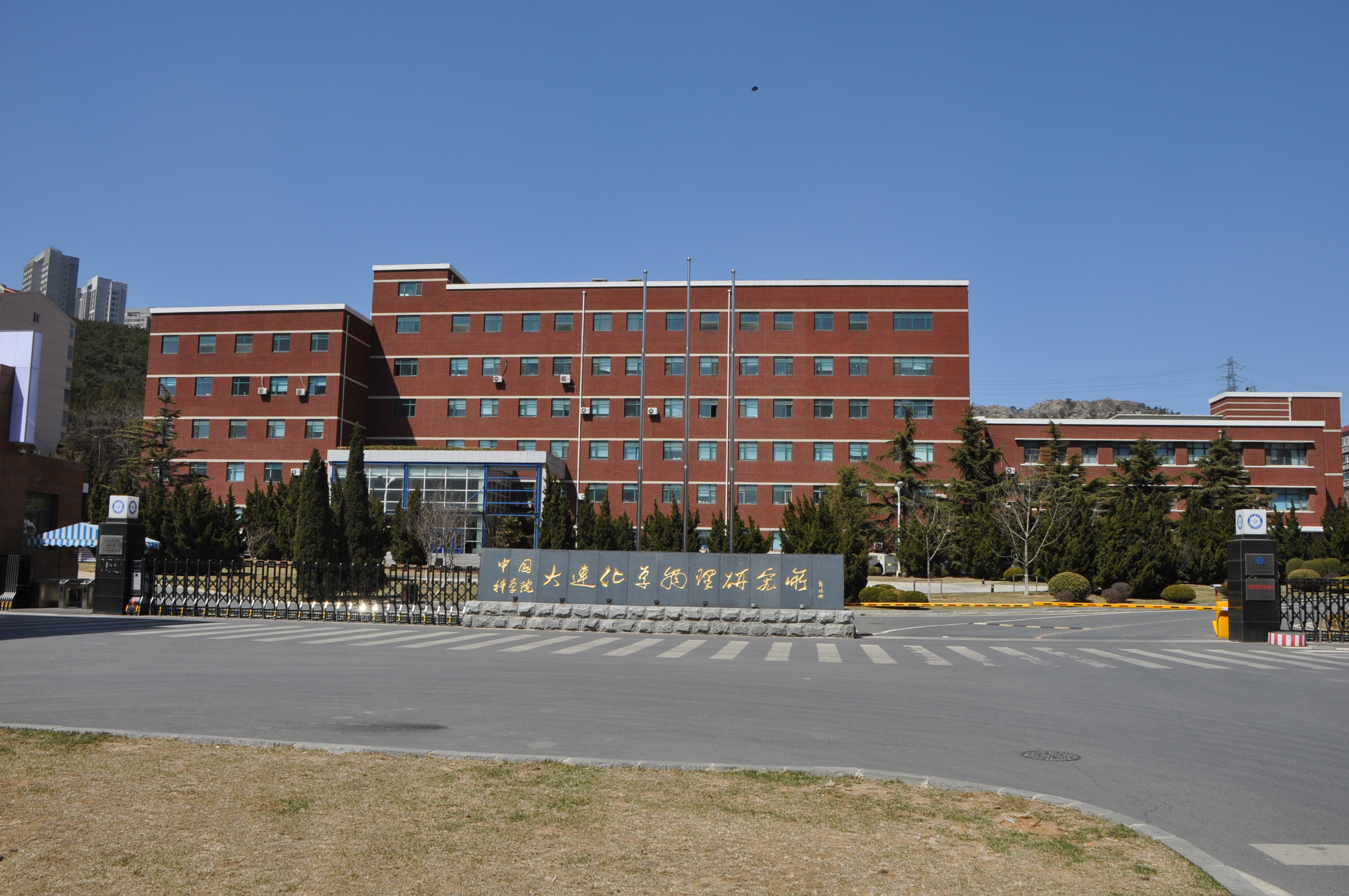
- Dalian Institute of Chemical Physics

Agency overview
- Formed: March 1949
- Headquarters: Dalian, Liaoning, China
- Agency executive: Liu Zhongmin (刘中民), Director
- Parent agency: Chinese Academy of Sciences
- Website: english.dicp.cas.cn

Dalian Institute of Chemical Physics
- Simplified Chinese: 大连化学物理研究所
- Traditional Chinese: 大連化學物理研究所
Transcriptions
Standard Mandarin
- Hanyu Pinyin: Dàlián Huàxuéwùlǐ Yánjiūsuǒ

Huawusuo
- Chinese: 化物所
Transcriptions
Standard Mandarin
- Hanyu Pinyin: Huà Wù Suǒ

The Dalian Institute of Chemical Physics (DICP) (Chinese: 大连化学物理研究所), also called Huawusuo (化物所), is a research centre specialized in physical chemistry, chemical physics, biophysical chemistry, chemical engineering and materials science belonging to the Chinese Academy of Sciences. It is located in Dalian, Liaoning, China.

== General Information ==
Having its origin in South Manchuria Railway's research department, which later became the Central Research Centre, the Dalian Institute of Chemical Physics was thus named in 1961 and moved its location from 129 Street (at Zhongshan Road) to the current address in 1995.

Dalian Institute of Chemical Physics is one of the leading research institutes in China. In the past half century, the institute has become internationally recognised for its research in catalytic chemistry, chemical engineering, chemical laser and molecular reaction dynamics, organic synthesis and chromatography for modern analytic chemistry and biotechnology.

The institute houses one national laboratory, two state key laboratories, and five national engineering research centres. The Dalian National Lab of Clean Energy (DNL) is the first national laboratory in the field of energy research and integrates laboratories across DICP and other institutions. DNL is subdivided into 10 divisions and its research is focused on the efficient conversion and optimal utilisation of fossil energy, clean energy conversion technologies and the economically viable use of solar and biomass energy. DICP's other main laboratories include the Laboratory of Instrumentation and Analytical Chemistry, the Laboratory of Fine Chemicals, the State Key Laboratory of Catalysis, the Laboratory of Chemical Lasers, the State Key Laboratory of Molecular Reaction Dynamics, the Laboratory of Aerospace Catalysis and New Materials, and the Laboratory of Biotechnology.

In 1979, Chinese scientists at the Dalian Institute of Chemical Physics first proposed the structure of the nitroamine explosive Hexanitrohexaazaisowurtzitane, an explosive with greater energy then conventional HMX or RDX.

In December 2019, a Chinese team involving scientists from the Dalian Institute of Chemical Physics and the company Feye UAV Technology developed a methanol-powered fuel system that kept a drone in the air for 12 hours, the FY-36. Fuel cell research at the institute had first started in the 1960s.

Since mid-2010 the Institute and its spin-off company Rongke Power have been the World's leading developer and manufacturer of vanadium redox flow batteries.

== Basic Data ==
- Name: Dalian Institute of Chemical Physics, Chinese Academy of Sciences
- Established: 1949
- Director: Liu Zhongmin (刘中民)
- Address: No. 457, Zhongshan Road, Shahekou District, Dalian, Liaoning, China. Postal code: 116023
- Transportation
  - Bus: Huawusuo Stop, No. 16, 22, 23, 28, 37, 406, 531, 901
  - Tramway: Huawusuo Stop, No. 202 Line (between Xinghai Square and Dalian Medical University's No. 2 Hospital)

== See also ==
- South Manchuria Railway
- Chinese Academy of Sciences
- Dalian Hi-Tech Zone
