= Renewable energy in South Korea =

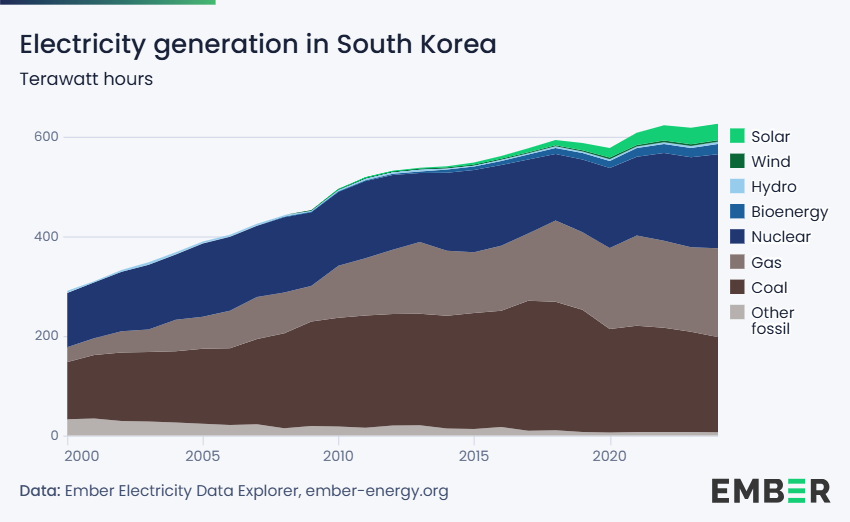
Electricity generation in South Korea - terawatt hours

The South Korean government plans to grow the renewable energy sector in the country. The country plans to use 20 percent renewable energy by 2030. The new plan will include a goal of 35 percent renewable energy by 2040. In the past, coal and nuclear power have been the pillars of South Korea's development. The country has long been one of the largest users of nuclear energy, but the liberal government, led by President Moon Jae In, decided to phase it out by 2057, fearing for its safety.

The share of renewables in South Korea's electricity generation rose from 4.7% in 2019 to 8.6% in 2024, with renewable generation reaching about 52 TWh, led by solar photovoltaics. This was among the lowest shares among IEA member countries, well below the IEA average of over 30%, a gap attributed largely to factors such as a scarcity of available land, extensive forest cover and high population density; under the 11th Basic Plan for Long-Term Electricity Supply and Demand, the country is projected to reach a renewable energy share of about 32.9% by 2038.

Share of electricity generation by fuel type in South Korea (2016, in percent)
1. Coal (41.8%)
2. Nuclear (28.9%)
3. Gas (22.5%)
4. Renewables (3.60%)
5. Oil (3.20%)

== Renewable electricity generation ==
The country's national Renewable Portfolio Standard (RPS) previously required a gradual increase of the renewable share of electricity generation from 2% in 2012 to 10% in 2023. The 9th Basic Plan for Long-term Electricity Supply and Demand 2020–2034, released in 2021, now targets 35% by 2030.

According to a government proposal published in 2022, South Korea plans to substantially increase its renewable energy capacity by the late next decade. The strategy aims to boost the share of renewables in the country's power mix from approximately 9% in 2022 to almost one-third by 2038. This significant increase is part of a broader initiative to decrease reliance on coal and natural gas, which are projected to decline sharply under the new energy policies. The move towards greater renewable energy use is crucial as South Korea seeks to reduce emissions and accommodate the growing electricity demands from industries such as semiconductor manufacturing. The successful implementation of this strategy will necessitate comprehensive upgrades to the existing energy infrastructure, including a major expansion of the electrical grid to manage the increased input from renewable sources.

=== Wind power ===
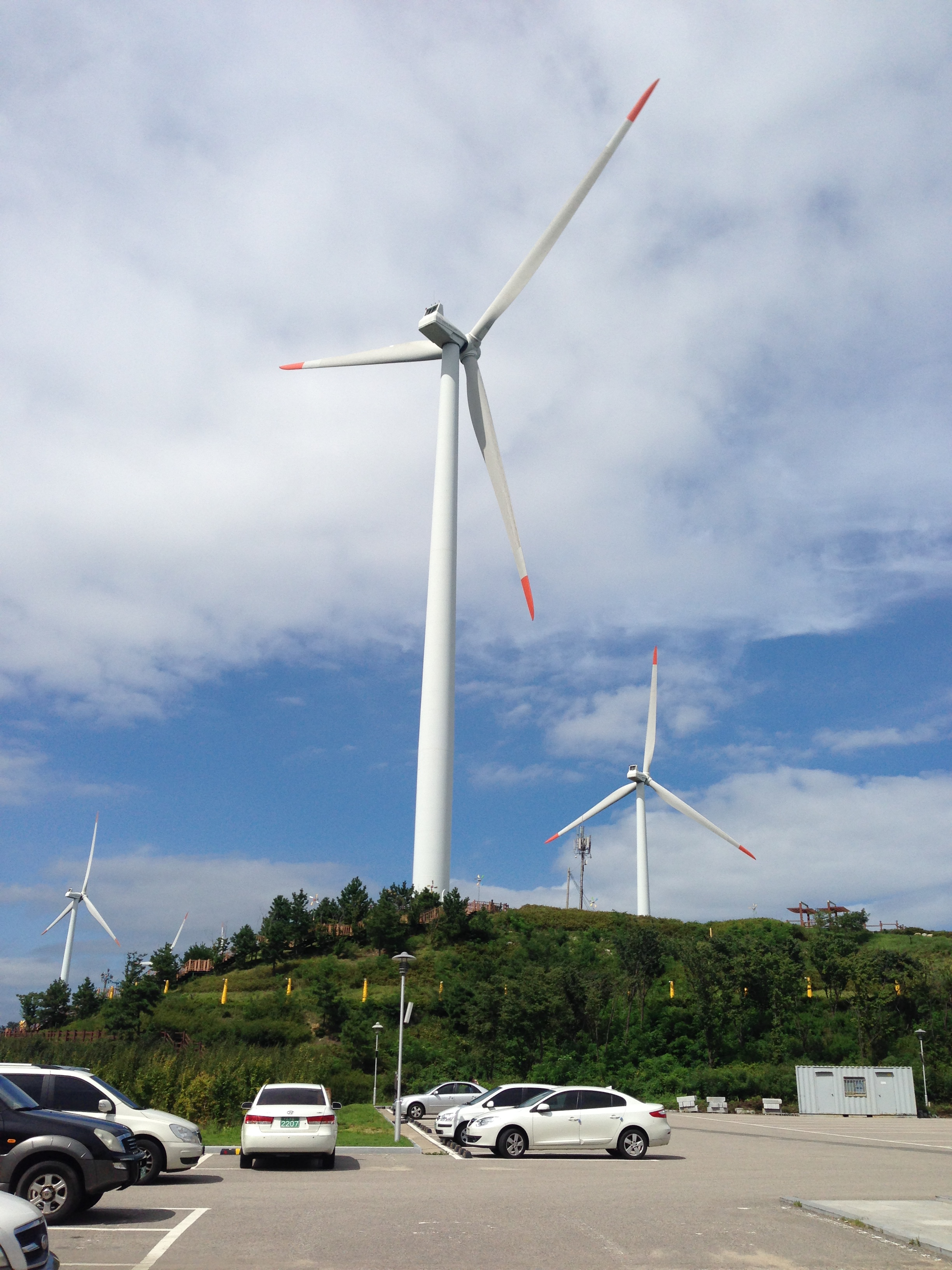
Turbines at the wind farm in Yeongam, North Jeolla

After years of incremental policy changes and investments, the country has set ambitious targets and announced major projects. In 2021, President Moon Jae-in announced a planned 8.2GW offshore wind farm that will be the largest in the world.

=== Solar power ===
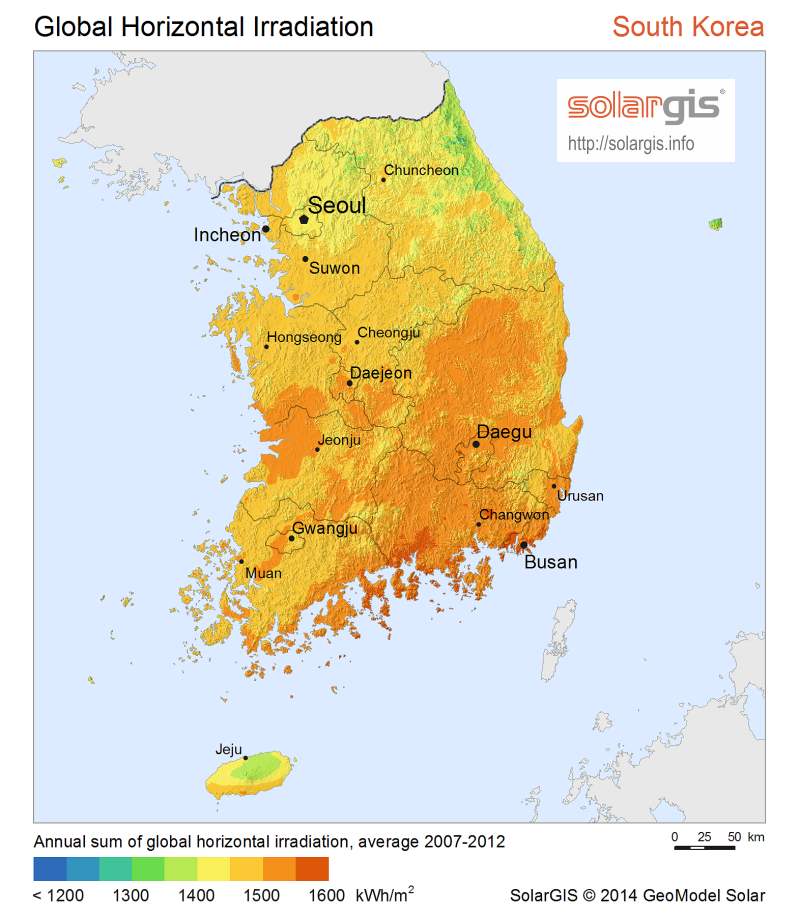
Solar potential map

South Korea is a fast-growing gigawatt-market for photovoltaics (PV) and plans to install 31 GW of solar power by 2030.

Hydro also comes under Korea Hydro & Nuclear Power Ltd. (한국수력원자력㈜)

=== Hydroelectricity ===
Hydroelectric power accounted for 5% of South Korea's total installed power generation in 2021 and 0.33% of the total power generation. There are hydroelectric power plants in various regions such as Gyeonggi, Gyeongbuk, and Chungbuk.

=== Geothermal energy ===
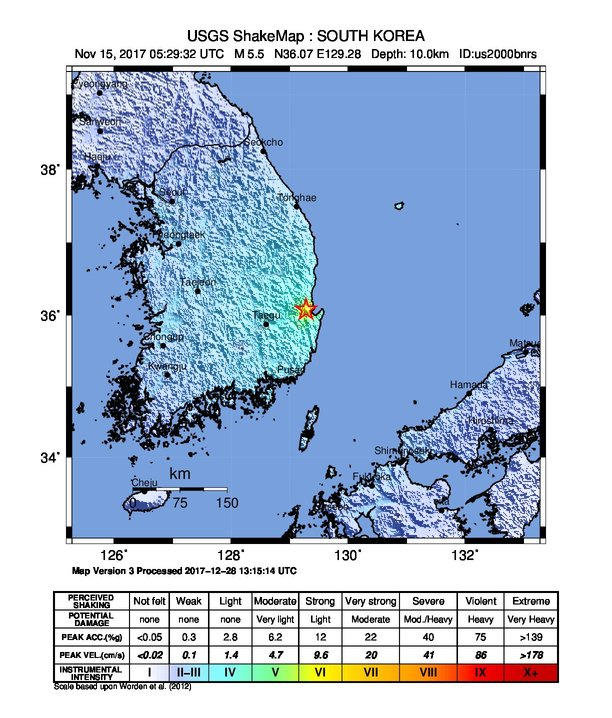
Earthquake in Pohang

Seoul Metropolitan Government has announced that it plans to power public buildings with geothermal energy as part of the city's comprehensive climate action plan to achieve carbon neutrality by 2050.

== 2050 carbon neutrality ==
In 2020, South Korea declared that it would seek to achieve carbon neutrality by 2050. In April 2021, the country pledged to end all new financing for coal-fired power plants abroad.

The country has raised its share of green programs above the average of members of the Organisation for Economic Co-operation and Development's Development Assistance Committee (DAC) and tripled its "ODA loans for green projects by 2025."

Korea held the Green Growth Cooperation Summit in May 2021. In August 2021, the National Assembly declared that it would achieve its goal of reaching net zero emissions by 2050, shortly after the establishment of the Presidential Commission on Carbon Neutrality and Green Growth.

== See also ==
- Energy in South Korea
- Renewable energy
- Renewable energy by country
- COP28
- Smart grids in South Korea
- Jeju Smart Grid Demonstration Project in Korea
- Ulsan Green Hydrogen Town
