= SK Inc. =

South Korean company

- Native name: 에스케이 주식회사
- Formerly: SK Holdings
- Type: Public
- Traded as: KRX: 034730
- Industry: Conglomerate; IT Services
- Founded: 1991; 35 years ago
- Headquarters: Seoul, South Korea
- Key people: Chey Tae-won (Chairman & CEO); Jang Dong-hyun (President & CEO); Park Sung-ha (President & CEO)
- Subsidiaries: SK Innovation; SK Telecom
- Website: www.sk-inc.com/en/

SK Inc. (Korean: 에스케이 주식회사) is the holding company of South Korea's SK Group and is headquartered in Seoul, South Korea. The company is divided into Investment Division and Business Division. The Investment Division operates as a holding company engaged in petroleum, telecommunications, wholesale and retail, chemicals, semiconductors, biotechnology, and other industries. It holds the SK Group's major subsidiaries, including SK Innovation, SK Telecom, SKC, SK Networks, SK Materials, and SK Biopharmaceutical. The Business Division, SK Inc. C&C, provides system integration, software design and development, information processing, and consulting services.

== History ==
In 1998, the company began providing services to SK Group affiliates. SK Holdings was established when SK Group decided to reorganize South Korea's biggest refiner SK Corporation into a holding company structure after a high-profile battle with Dubai-based fund Sovereign Asset Management in 2003. Although Sovereign failed to oust fraud-convicted chairman Chey Tae-won, SK sought to increase transparency and corporate governance to prevent further pressures from activist shareholders. In 2007, SK Corporation was split into two entities, with SK Energy inheriting the core business and SK Holdings serving as a holding firm with stakes in various affiliates of the SK Group conglomerate.

Despite the reorganization, consistent concerns had been raised over the unstable structure of corporate governance. Although SK Holdings was a holding company, SK's information technology service provider SK C&C controlled the group through its 31.8 percent stake in SK Holdings. Accordingly, SK merged SK Holdings and SK C&C to streamline its management structure in 2015. The merger between two companies enabled group chairman Chey Tae-won and his related parties to hold more than a 30% stake in the new SK Holdings. It solidified their ownership compared to the pre-merger when Chey's stake in ex-SK Holdings was only 0.02 percent.

In 2021, SK Holdings changed its name to SK Inc.

== See also ==
- SK Group
