= MicroVolts =

2010 video game

Microvolts
- Original logo
- Developer: NQ Games (2010-2017) Masangsoft (2017-)
- Publishers: Rock Hippo Productions LTD. (2010-2017); Masangsoft (2017-)
- Engine: Gamebryo with PhysX
- Platform: Windows
- Release: Initial release: August 12, 2010; Masangsoft release on steam: August 2023
- Genre: Third-person shooter
- Mode: Multiplayer (online)

MicroVolts (H.A.V.E Online) is an online multiplayer shooter developed by Korean developer SK iMedia and published by Toronto-based publisher Rock Hippo Productions for Windows (PC). MicroVolts released its first closed beta phase on August 12, 2010 and launched its second closed beta on January 28, 2011. The game's open beta phase began on March 10, 2011. Rock Hippo Productions announced that the official release of the game would start on June 9, 2011. It was shut down on 9. September 2017 9 am GMT and the rights were allegedly sold to Masangsoft.

The game was ranked as the Second Most Anticipated MMO of 2010 by MMOSite's Reader's Choice Awards. It was also named as MMOGames' Editor's Choice in April 2011.

== Story ==
Set in Hyuga High School's figure club, the core of this game is the drama of various characters. Set in a miniature garden diorama with chessboards, schools, war-destroyed towns, gardens, ships, toy boxes, and more, players operate electric figurines modeled after the members of the figure club and wield various weapons. Naomi, Pandora, Knox and C.H.I.P were the names of the original prototypes, but they were soon joined by other modified versions (Kai, Simon, Amelia, Sophitia, and $harkill Khan). The toys battle it out for valuable battery resources and ultimate supremacy of the Micro World.

== Characters ==
=== Naomi ===
Naomi was the first female doll introduced to the MicroWorld. She is the most played female character, followed by Pandora. Her innocent, anime school girl appearance often misleads her enemies into thinking she is of little threat.

Naomi had base Run Speed +2.0% and did more Rifle damage.

=== Pandora ===
Named after the Greek mythology character, Pandora uses evil tricks to dominate the playground. Not fond of males, due to a neglectful owner, this ball-jointed doll uses her seductive appeal to lure in targets before destroying them. Pandora also despises Naomi, a young anime doll.

Pandora has pale purple skin and has often more of a gothic/dark look, making her seductive and poise.

She was one of the first 4 figurines released, and obtaining her had the cost of 20000 MicroPoints. Later in MicroVolts Surge this was changed and she became a free playable character.

Pandora had +2.5% Explosion Armor and did more Sniper damage.

=== C.H.I.P ===
C.H.I.P. (Complex Humanoid Interchangeable Parts) is a mechanized Stikfas Figure originally created using spare parts salvaged from a junk yard. He has a very taunting and fun personality, making him loved by many. He is extremely impatient and always the first to charge into battle, without any regard for his own safety. This makes him a highly unpredictable opponent. He was one of the first 4 figurines released, and obtaining him had the cost of 20000 MicroPoints. Later in MicroVolts Surge this was changed and he became a free playable character.

C.H.I.P had a base HP of 2040, Run Speed boosted by 1.0% and did more Bazooka damage.

=== Knox ===
Knox was one of the first four figurines in the game, being cost free made him the most played male character until MicroVolts Surge. He is the stereotypical 'punk' character, dressing in t-shirts and shorts along with rather ridiculous hairstyles. His comments are also very intimidating and taunting. Knox was made to be a more tough version of Kai.

Knox had a base HP of 2080 and did more Gatling Gun damage.

=== Kai ===
Kai is modeled after a highschool boy, going in pair with Naomi. He was the fifth figure added to the game, charming everyone and becoming one of the most played characters. Although he was added so late into the game, his character was one of the first 4 figurines made in MicroVolts lore, making him a character well known to the Asian playerbase.

=== New generation ===
There were 4 more characters later added to the game that don't have much information about their background.

Amelia is modeled after an Elf, having a more pristine and clean look. She was first obtainable through MP and RT hammers, RT shop or Legenday High Elf Package. She was the first character that had her own set of weapons. Amelia's base stats were run speed +3.0%, and Explosion Armor +10.0%.

Sophitia was a peaceful priestess that choose the way of war to fulfill her destiny. Her figure wore a silk white dress and gold accessories making her look godly and pristine.

Simon was a cyborg figurine. Due to being in a near death situation, Simon had his body armored and he turned into what he is today. His main life motive is hunting and killing people who hurt him. He was obtainable by MP or RT Hammers or 6900RT. He had his own set of obtainable weapons only available to his use. When added, Simon had +100 HP and +10% Bullet Armor protection, but it was changed to +30 HP and +3.0% Bullet Armor because people considered him over-powered.

Sharkill Khan was a figurine modeled after a rapper. Not much information was released about this character. His base HP was 2200 and that was the only buff he had.

== Weapons ==
Unique to MicroVolts is the fact that players have access to all seven types of weapons within a given match, unrestricted by class. The weapons are Melee, Rifle, Shotgun, Sniper Rifle, Gatling Gun, Bazooka and Grenade Launcher. Each player starts out equipped with a basic weapon of each type, and can purchase more weapons through Micro Points from the in-game shop.

New players receive a set of trial weapons for a week. These possess much better stats than the default stock weapons. Unlike weapons bought with RT, these need no repairs. This helps the player to build up an amount of MP before leveling up.

=== Weapon Upgrade System ===
- The Weapon Upgrade System was added in the Luck and Load Update on 2011-11-10
- It's a system where you can upgrade one stat of your MP or RT weapon up to level nine by using battery energy and paying mp
- You can fail at the upgrade and when you do, you lose your MP or energy you used to upgrade it. There is a possibility the weapon could downgrade. Unfortunately, that means that the weapon will go down one level, but you can prevent that by getting the weapon protection item.(Downgrade system was removed, in the newer version of the game)
- Buying super glue will increase your chances of not failing an upgrade by 100%.
- When MicroVolts Surge was launched, the level of upgrading increased from 5 to 9. At level 9, it reduces the chance by 30%.

Furthermore, the upgrade options will have the same value as long as they are of the same type.

== Gameplay ==
=== Game modes ===
There are 17 game modes in MicroVolts: Team Death Match, Free For All, Item Match, Capture the Battery, Close Combat, Elimination, Zombie Mode, Arms Race, Invasion, Scrimmage, Bomb Battle and Boss Battle. Each mode requires the player to use different skills in order to succeed. While some of the modes rely on team play and cooperation, such as Team Death Match and Elimination, other modes require a player to play offensively, such as Free For All and Close Combat and Arms Race.

Boss Battle is a special mode where 1-4 players have to fight an enormous robot and mini-robots called "Trackers". Players must avoid attacks and destroy the mini-robots in order to survive. Successfully defeating the boss and winning the mode will give each player a gift box of Diamond, Gold, Silver or Bronze; Diamond is the rarest. Each contains a random gift, and better gifts correspond to the rarity of the box. Completing this mode doesn't give the player any experience points or micro points (MP), as in other modes.

=== Maps ===
There are 28 different maps, each featuring a different theme, layout and size. The 28 toy-like environment maps include:

- Junk Yard
- Forgotten Junk Yard
- Castle
- Neighbourhood
- House Top
- Model Ship
- PVC Factory
- PVC Factory(Night)
- Chess
- Battle Mine
- Toy Garden
- Toy Garden 2
- Magic Paper Land
- Toy Fleet
- Academy
- Hobby Shop
- Bitmap
- Bitmap 2
- Wild West
- Rumpus Room
- Cargo
- Beach
- Tracker Factory
- Rock Band
- Rock Band W
- Rock Band S
- Foosball
- Championship Castle siege

The Reactor map is only for Invasion. Academy Invasion is the only map for the Boss Battle. Some maps are exclusive to certain game modes.

== Game features ==
=== Battery Charge ===
Battery Charge is the game's reward system. By completing certain activities, players are able to unlock new rewards in the form of Micro Points, forum signature, image/video posting privileges, poll creation, and for a 25% charge earn a "RockHippo" set playable for the Knox character. The Battery Charge System is currently removed but developers are planning on a similar, better system.

=== Achievement system ===
By completing certain objectives in-game, players unlock achievements. This allows players to gain Micro Points to spend in-game. There have been no updates to this system since it was first introduced.

=== Community events and forum ===
MicroVolts regularly hosts game tournaments, social media and forum events for players. These have included a Splash of Colour Event, which invited players to colour-in a wallpaper design, submitted as an official MicroVolts wallpaper; and a CrossVolt Contest which quizzed players on their MicroVolts game IQ.

=== Social media ===
The game engages with players through Facebook, YouTube, Twitter and MySpace. Its website features a clubhouse area which grants players access to unique community features.

=== Clans ===
In the new Clan Hall, players can now create or manage their clans. They can also request membership into coveted clans or recruit elite members to their ranks. Players ultimately compete in-game with other clans for domination of the MicroWorld and placement on the Clan Leaderboard.

=== Ranked Mode ===
5 tiers and 3 advanced tiers!

From Bronze to Diamond, and Advanced tiers for the top players!

Competition is always fun, thrilling, and challenging.

Each season a new league will start to determine who would be the true honorable winners!

You play better? Prove it on the League Match!

=== League Match ===
In the new release of the game MicroVolts now known as MicroVolts Recharged, once the game releases they will add the league match system which will be a 2v2 match with chooseable gamemodes, maps and in the loading screen you'll be approached by the newly added dioramas.

== Free-to-play ==
MicroVolts is released under the free-to-play category of games; the game itself is free to download and play, and revenue is generated from micropayments. Players may buy the in-game currency, called Rock Tokens (RT), to purchase exclusive items to customize their characters. Hair, face, top, bottom, hands, shoes and accessories for each character can upgrade the character's abilities, such as faster run speed, additional health points and extra bullets. Additional weapon upgrades can also be obtained.

Customizable options can also be purchased through in-game points called Micro Points (MP). These can be earned by playing the game. The number of Micro Points given to a player is determined by their kill/death ratio, their mission accomplishments, a win or loss and the duration of the match. Micro Points are also given for accomplishing certain objectives in the in-game Achievement System, completing objectives in their Battery Charge system, and leveling up characters. Gaining levels has no impact on gameplay, but serves as a useful indicator of skill. The game keeps track of individual performance with every weapon and character as well.

A comprehensive update of MicroVolts in 2011 introduced a new "Capsule" icon from which players could get items. The capsule machine can currently be used with RT. Rock Hippo Productions introduced MP mode for the capsule machine, but they removed this feature soon after. This was most likely because people exploited it by creating thousands of new accounts, and spinning the machine endlessly until they hit an MP Jackpot, resulting in millions of MP points. Most capsule weapons do not require repairing, and MP weapons are much more less powerful than RT weapons.

Players level up their characters through gaining experience points within a played match. Experience points are determined by a player's kill/death ratio in a match, a win/loss of a match, mission accomplishments and the duration of the match. When a player levels up, additional customizable options become available.

== Reception and recognition ==
MicroVolts was awarded Second Place in MMOSite's Reader's Choices for the Most Anticipated MMO of 2010, and was MMOGames' Editor's Choice in April 2011.

The gaming community welcomed this third-person shooter as something new and different, as most shooter MMOs are from the first-person perspective. The ability for characters to carry seven weapons at once, freely switching between each, "makes gameplay feel varied and unique".

Reviews have highlighted the game's larger-than-life environments as giving the game a "different feel and approach to the online-action genre", and having a distinct fast-paced gameplay.

MicroVolts was also noted by some gamers as bearing similarities to Team Fortress 2, as an early trailer for MicroVolts had a comparable graphic style. All the weapons in the game are equivalents of TF2 weapons.

== The capsule machine ==
The capsule machine (released November 11, 2011) features "rares" that are unique and generally cannot be won anywhere else in-game. Rares include gold, silver, and bronze forms. All seven weapons have versions of "rares." Rare clothes also exist for each character. Some have since been retired.

The Capsule Machine costs 1,000 RT (roughly $1) a spin, and the user spinning is guaranteed to receive an item. The chances of winning a rare based on an 100k RockToken / Weapon experiment are roughly expressed by a 1 : 75 ratio (or a 1 in 75 chance of winning a rare). Clothes are easier to win, and have a rough 1 : 25 ratio per rare. Whether the clothing won is HP or Speed is completely random and determined on the spot.
