= Ulsan Green Hydrogen Town =

Planned city in Ulsan, South Korea

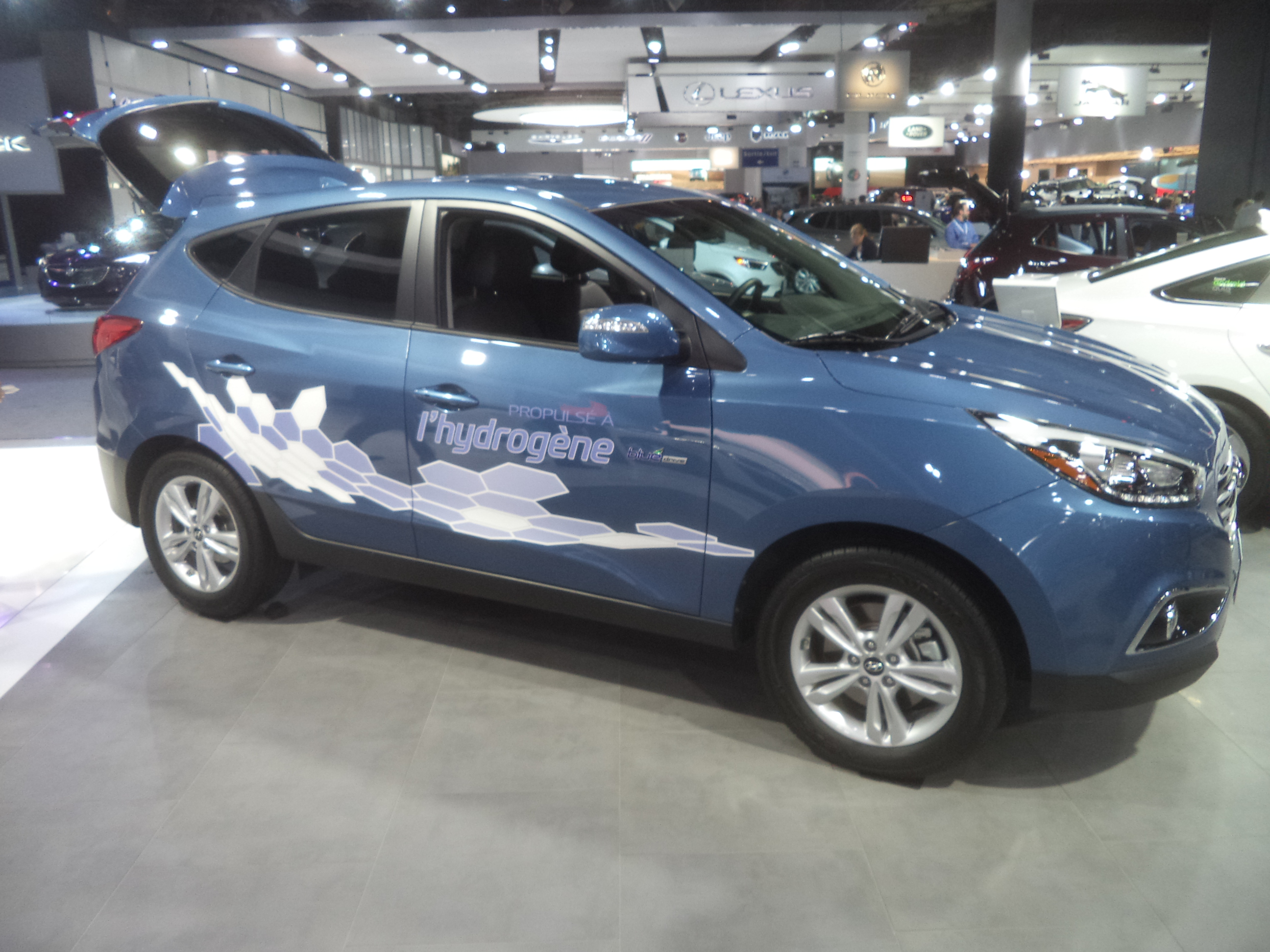
Hyundai ix35 FCEV

The Ulsan Green Hydrogen Town (Korean: 울산 수소시범도시) is a hydrogen city being developed as a pilot project in Ulsan, South Korea. As of October 2024, 188km of underground pipelines have been laid to connect hydrogen produced as a byproduct from petrochemical complexes to the city center.

Ulsan is the city that built the Maeam Charging Station, the first automobile hydrogen charging station in South Korea in 2009. In addition, the first hydrogen ship charging station in the country was installed in Jangsaengpo Port in 2021. In December 2016, 10 Hyundai ix35 FCEVs, the first hydrogen fuel cell taxis in the country, entered test operation.

In 2018, Ulsan city invested a total of KR₩ 250 billion to establish the city as a global hydrogen-based energy hub city. With a goal of construction in 2019, KRW 27.2 billion was invested to build an eco-friendly battery fusion demonstration complex with a full-cycle production system related to the hydrogen industry, from hydrogen production and supply to fuel cell demonstration, R&D, and commercialization, on a 4,800 m^{2} site near Ulsan Techno Park. In addition, a plan was prepared to build a logistics system to distribute byproduct hydrogen produced in the Ulsan Industrial Complex nationwide.

== Overview ==
Ulsan City was selected for the Ministry of Land, Infrastructure and Transport's Hydrogen City Development Project public offering in September 2024, and plans to invest KRW 29.5 billion over the next four years to build 9.7 km and 5.2 km hydrogen pipeline networks, directly supply hydrogen to hydrogen charging stations, and promote regional specialized projects to demonstrate innovative technologies for the first hydrogen tractor in South Korea.

=== Charging station ===
As part of the Ministry of Trade, Industry and Energy's renewable energy core technology development project, the Development Plan for Empirical-Based Reliability Verification Technology for Commercialization of Hydrogen Forklifts, the hydrogen charging station project for hydrogen forklifts was promoted with a total project cost of KRW 6.05 billion, including KRW 1.39 billion in government funds and self-financing. The hydrogen forklifts operated by Korea Zinc are one 3t class from Doosan Bobcat and four 5t class from HD Hyundai Site Solution, and the Construction Equipment Parts Research Institute has completed verification of the finished vehicle durability test and hillclimbing ability.

On August 28, 2024, the city held a completion ceremony for the first hydrogen charging station for hydrogen forklifts in the country at Korea Zinc Plant 1 in the Onsan National Industrial Complex in Ulju County. Ulsan Mayor Kim Du-gyeom evaluated the project by saying, "We have completed the hydrogen charging infrastructure for the three axes of hydrogen mobility, including automobiles, ships, and construction equipment, for the first time in Korea, thereby establishing a solid foundation for Ulsan's position as a leading hydrogen city."

=== House ===
In order to create a hydrogen pilot city, the city invested a total of 48.7 billion won to connect a total of 10.5 km of hydrogen pipelines built in industrial complexes through Taehwagang station to the Yuldong Hydrogen Fuel Cell Combined Heat and Power Plant in Yangjeong-dong, Buk-gu, and held a completion ceremony at an apartment complex in the Yuldong District of Buk-gu in October 2024. Electricity produced from hydrogen at the Yuldong Hydrogen Fuel Cell Combined Heat and Power Plant will be sold to Korea Electric Power Corporation, and the waste heat generated will be supplied as hot water and heating to 437 public rental housing units in the Yuldong District. This is an example of the world's first Carbon-neutral hydrogen apartment that does not emit additional greenhouse gases during the heating process.

=== Transportation ===
The first urban railway project using fuel cell trams is being promoted.

=== Power station ===
Lotte SK Enerroot will install a total of three Eco-friendly hydrogen fuel cell power plants, including one 20MW unit and two 9MW units, in the Lotte Chemical and Lotte Fine Chemical Ulsan plants, respectively, to supply approximately 290,000MWh of eco-friendly electricity annually for 20 years starting in 2026.

=== Technology development ===
In November 2024, the city signed a business agreement with Hyundai Motor Company to build a hydrogen ecosystem in Ulsan and is carrying out a project to develop the first hydrogen tractor in the country. In conjunction with the Ministry of Land, Infrastructure and Transport's selection of a hydrogen city development project competition, three hydrogen tractors will be operated for demonstration purposes on long-distance cargo logistics routes between Ulsan and Seoul and Ulsan and Incheon. The main goal is to develop core technologies domestically and fully convert to domestic eco-friendly vehicles.

== Benchmarking ==
Government officials and businesspeople from countries such as Uruguay, Taiwan, and Indonesia visited Ulsan to benchmark the town.

In March 2024, as part of the Korea Research Institute for Human Settlements's Knowledge Sharing Program training course titled Activating Research and Development Innovation for the Development of Uruguayan Green Hydrogen Industry, a delegation of Uruguayan public officials visited Ulsan, test-drove Hyundai Rotem's hydrogen fuel cell tram, and toured the Hyundai Nexo production base. In May 2024, Taiwanese government agencies and companies toured the Ulsan Plant 2 of Approtium, the largest hydrogen supplier in Korea, toured the plant facilities and heard about the status of Ulsan as a hydrogen city. They also saw Hyundai Motor Company's hydrogen electric vehicle production base and electric vehicle plant construction site, Yuldong Combined Heat and Power Plant that supplies heat and electricity with hydrogen fuel cells, and hydrogen ship charging stations. In August 2024, Ulsan City conducted training to strengthen the policy capacity of the eco-industrial complex to respond to climate change for Indonesian Ministry of Industry officials.

== See also ==
- Hydrogen economy
- Renewable energy in South Korea
