= KCCI (disambiguation) =

KCCI is a television station licensed to Des Moines, Iowa, United States.

KCCI may also refer to:

- Karachi Chamber of Commerce & Industry
- Korea Chamber of Commerce and Industry
- Kuwait Chamber of Commerce and Industry
