= SK Oceanplant =

South Korean offshore wind turbine manufacturer

SK Oceanplant Co., Ltd.
- Native name: 에스케이오션플랜트 주식회사
- Company type: Public
- Traded as: KRX: 100090
- Industry: Offshore wind power industry, shipbuilding industry
- Founded: 1996; 30 years ago
- Headquarters: Goseong County, South Gyeongsang Province, South Korea
- Products: Offshore wind structures
- Number of employees: 533 (2022)
- Parent: SK Ecoplant
- Website: www.skoceanplant.com

SK Oceanplant (Korean: SK오션플랜트) is a large South Korean company headquartered in Goseong County, South Gyeongsang Province, engaged in steel pipe manufacturing, offshore wind power generation, and shipbuilding. It is an affiliate of SK Group.

== History ==
SK Ocean Plant's predecessor is Samkang M&T (삼강엔앰티), established in 1999. The company is a shipbuilding and equipment company that has been manufacturing offshore wind power plants, including substructures (jackets), since the early 2010s. It was incorporated as a subsidiary of SK Ecoplant in August 2022 and changed its name to SK Oceanplant in January 2023.

== Offshore wind power ==
As of 2024, the company's offshore wind power infrastructure accounts for 44% of the Taiwanese market. In June 2024, the company signed a contract to supply jackets for the Taiwan 'Pengmiao 1' offshore wind power project worth 285.5 million USD.
