= Federation of Korean Industries =

The Federation of Korean Industries (FKI) is a major economic organization in South Korea. Founded in 1961, it has more than 600 members among Korean industries and companies. Leading conglomerates such as Samsung (Byung-Chul Lee), Hyundai (Ju-yung Chung), SK (Jong-Hyun Chey), and LG Corporation (Ja Kyung Koo) have served as the Chairman of FKI. Current FKI Chairman is Jin Ryu (English name "Roy"), Chairman of Poong-san (Korean Defense Industry Company). Ryu has represented FKI and Korean business community since 2023. FKI is located in Yeoido, Seoul, Korea.
