= Fallen Age =

Cancelled video game

- Developer: Netamin
- Publisher: SK Corp
- Producer: Daniel Manachi
- Platform: Windows
- Release: Cancelled

Fallen Age is a cancelled massively multiplayer online role-playing game from Netamin, both announced and shelved in 2001.

== Gameplay ==
In Fallen Age, players would have entered a cyberpunk world that fused science fiction with fantasy elements. The gameplay was built around a system of over 126 unique spells and skill abilities, all rendered in isometric 3D visuals. Beyond traditional RPG mechanics, the game introduced a colonization sub-game that blended turn-based simulation with real-time strategy.

== Development ==
The game was announced in February 2001. The title had been in development for two years with 15 members working on Fallen Age at Netamin, and 50 individuals at their partner SK Corp.

Fallen Age was originally scheduled to be released in Q4 2001. It was put on indefinite hold in July 2001. Netamin cited creative differences with their partners in Korea as reasons why the game was cancelled.
