= Korea Chamber of Commerce and Industry =

South Korean business association

- 대한상공회의소

- Korea Chamber of Commerce and Industry building in Seoul
- Abbreviation: KCCI
- Formation: 1884; 142 years ago
- Type: Business association
- Location: Seoul, South Korea
- Chairman: Chey Tae-won
- Website: kcciglobalsquare.net

Korea Chamber of Commerce and Industry (KCCI; Korean: 대한상공회의소; RR: Daehan Sanggong Hoeuiso) is a business association based in South Korea. Founded in 1884, KCCI represents over 180,000 businesses, ranging from small enterprises to large corporations. As the oldest business organization in the country, it stands as one of the leading business advocacy groups in South Korea, alongside the Federation of Korean Industries.

== History ==
The Korea Chamber of Commerce and Industry traces its origins to the Seoul (Hanseong) Chamber of Commerce, which was founded in 1884. During Japan's occupation of Korea, the Japanese authorities sought to control the local economy by managing regional chambers of commerce. As a result, the Japanese Chamber of Commerce in Seoul and Korea's Seoul Chamber of Commerce were merged. Through this consolidated organization, Japan exploited Korea's economy by monitoring local markets and promoting the interests of Japanese nationals. After Korea's liberation, efforts were made to revive the Seoul Chamber of Commerce. In 1946, the Korea Chamber of Commerce was established. With the passage of the Chamber of Commerce Act in 1952, it became an official statutory body.

== Organization ==
The KCCI consists of 73 regional chambers of commerce and more than 100 prominent institutions and organizations. It also has three international offices located in Beijing, China; Hanoi, Vietnam; and Frankfurt, Germany.

== International offices ==
Location	Country	Established	Primary role	Korean businesses served
Beijing	China	1993	Supports Korean businesses in China; serves as executive office of the Korea Chamber of Commerce in China	~6,000 members (as of 2015)
Hanoi	Vietnam	2009	Supports Korean businesses in Vietnam; serves as executive office of the Korea Chamber of Commerce in Vietnam	—
Frankfurt	Germany	2024	Economic cooperation platform for Korean and German businesses; collaborates with the Frankfurt Chamber of Commerce and Industry	—

== See also ==
- Economy of South Korea
- International Chamber of Commerce
