= KEPCO Plant Service & Engineering =

South Korean company

KEPCO Plant Service & Engineering Co., Ltd.
- Native name: 한전케이피에스 주식회사
- Company type: Public
- Industry: Engineering
- Founded: 1974; 52 years ago
- Headquarters: Naju, South Jeolla, South Korea
- Services: Power plants' maintenance
- Parent: KEPCO
- Website: www.kps.co.kr

KEPCO Plant Service & Engineering Co., Ltd. (KEPCO KPS; Korean: 한전케이피에스 주식회사; RR: Hanjeon Keipiesseu Jusik Hoesa), a subsidiary of KEPCO, is a South Korean public enterprise established in 1974 to provide electronic power and industrial facilities.

== See also ==
- KEPCO
- KEPCO E&C
