= Ilijan Combined-Cycle Power Plant =

- Country: Philippines
- Location: Ilijan, Batangas City
- Coordinates: 13°37′19″N 121°04′47″E
- Status: Operational
- Construction began: March 1999
- Commission date: June 2000
- Construction cost: est. US$ 700 Million
- Operator: KEPCO Ilijan Corporation

Thermal power station
- Primary fuel: Natural gas
- Secondary fuel: Distillate oil No.2
- Combined cycle?: Yes

Power generation
- Nameplate capacity: 1200 MW

External links
- Website: www.kepcophilippines.com

Ilijan Combined-Cycle Power Plant is a dual-fuel power station in Ilijan, Batangas City. It is primarily a natural gas plant and uses distillate oil as a secondary back-up fuel source. With the nameplate capacity of 1200 MW, it is the largest natural gas facility in the Philippines. The plant is designed to draw natural gas from the Malampaya gas field.

The plant is the first power facility in the country to use the 500 kV switchyard system and reverse osmosis system. The Ilijan plant's construction began in March 1999 and was commissioned in June 2000.
