= Electric vehicle charging industry of South Korea =

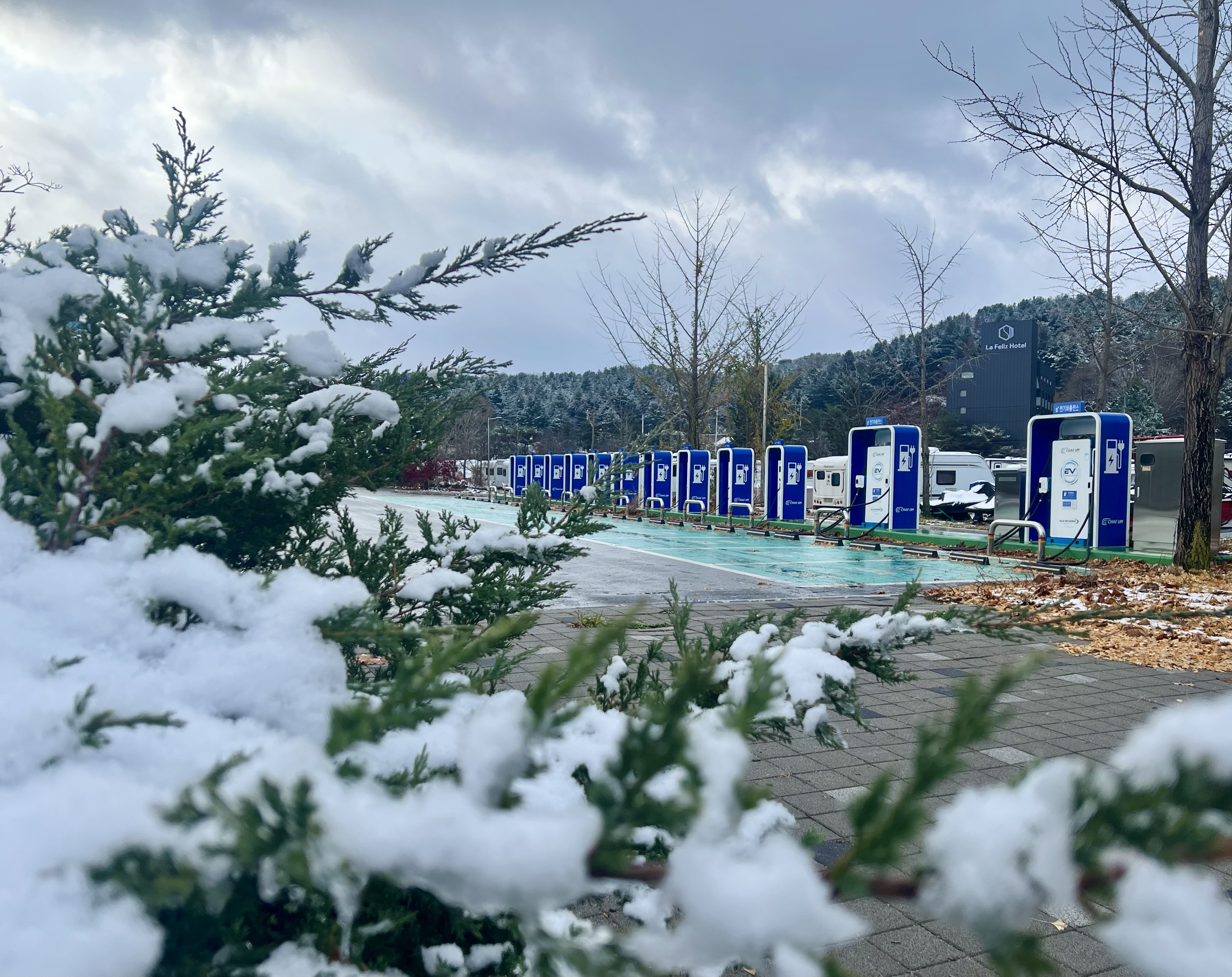
Charging stations in Chuncheon, Gangwon Province, South Korea

The electric vehicle charging industry of South Korea consists of various domestic and foreign organizations. It has produced thousands of chargers, which have exceeded the number of electric vehicles in the country. The expansion of EV charging infrastructure has been supported by funding from the South Korean government. As of 2024, most charging stations installed in South Korea were underground.

== Charging providers ==
=== Domestic brands ===
Government-licensed chargers installed, by company (as of February 2018)
1. KT: 3,656 (43.2%)
2. Posco ICT: 1,621 (19.2%)
3. GNTEL: 1,273 (15.1%)
4. Korea Electric Vehicle Charge Service: 1,240 (14.7%)
5. EVERON: 667 (7.89%)

==== Chaevi ====
In 2022, Chaevi opened a US office. In March 2026, Chaevi signed a memorandum of understanding with Emirates Electrical Engineering to supply chargers to the United Arab Emirates. As of April 2026, Chaevi had "5,900 charging points nationwide."

==== GS ====
In May 2019, GS Caltex partnered with LG Electronics and Signetev to install EV chargers at its gas stations. As of August 2024, GS Chargev had 61,000 chargers.

In June 2022, GS Energy and GS Neotek collectively acquired 40% of charger developer AppleMango. GS Connect, the electric vehicle charging subsidiary owned jointly by GS Energy and Gntel, operated "over 10,000 chargers nationwide" as of July that year.

==== Hyundai ====
In March 2021, Hyundai Motor unveiled E-pit, its high-speed charging brand. That year, Hyundai Motor also "acquired the management rights of Korea Electric Vehicle Charging Service (KEVCS)." As of March 2024, Hyundai Motor operated 286 E-pit chargers.

==== KEPCO ====
In January 2011, Korea Electric Power Corporation opened the first highway rest area EV charging stations in South Korea. As of 2017, Korea Electric Power Corporation had 1,560 electric vehicle charging stations.

==== KT ====
In 2015, KT signed a memorandum of understanding with Seoul Metropolitan Government and Powercube for mobile charging stations in Seoul. KT has partnered with different firms for charger credit card support and electric bus charging.

==== LG ====
In June 2022, LG Electronics acquired a 60% stake in charger developer AppleMango. LG renamed the affiliate to HiEV Charger in May 2023. In January 2024, LG Electronics opened a charger factory in the United States. In June, LG Electronics announced that it signed a memorandum of understanding to provide EV charging equipment to ChargePoint in the United States. In April 2025, LG announced the liquidation of HiEV.

===== Kakao =====
LG Uplus VoltUp, a charging joint venture between LG Uplus and Kakao Mobility, was established in June 2024. They had 10,700 chargers as of August that year.

==== Lotte ====
Lotte Innovate acquired EVSIS in 2022. As of March 2024, EVSIS operated "more than 4,000 electric vehicle chargers across the group's network of department stores, supermarkets and hotels." EVSIS established a factory in Cheongju that year.

==== LS ====
In May 2010, LS Cable signed a cooperative agreement to set up charging infrastructure for Seoul Metro. In April 2022, LS Group established LS E-Link, an EV charging services subsidiary.

==== POSCO ====
As of 2016, POSCO ICT had partnered with Hyundai Motor, BMW Korea, and GM Korea "to build EV charging infrastructure."

==== SK ====
In February 2019, SK Energy began installing EV chargers at its gas stations.

SK Broadband joined the EV charging business in 2021. SK Broadband's charging business began operating under GS Chargev in March 2024.

In 2022, SK networks became the 2nd largest shareholder of Everon, an EV Charge Point Operator. As of 2024, Everon had 38,000 chargers.

As of November 2022, SK Signet had supplied at least 2,500 fast chargers in the United States. That year, SK Signet had acquired a facility from Raytheon in the United States to produce EV chargers. In January 2023, SK Signet held a leading market share of over 50% in the United States. In July 2023, SK Signet began commercial operations at its Texas site.

=== Foreign brands ===
==== BMW ====
As of September 2024, BMW Korea had installed 1,600 chargers in the country. That month, BMW launched its Charging Hub Lounge in cooperation with GS ChargEV for charging and LG Electronics for Plug & Charge. PnC allows for automatic recognition of EV information through the charging cable for certification and payment.

==== Tesla ====
In September 2016, Tesla announced that its chargers would be installed across Shinsegae locations. By May 2017, Tesla had built a rapid-charging station in South Korea, in addition to its 35 existing slow-charging stations. In December, convenience store chain CU announced that it would install Tesla chargers at some of its stores. In November 2023, Tesla opened chargers in South Korea to vehicles from other brands.

== Government involvement ==
=== Support ===
As of 2018, the Ministry of Environment provided hundreds of millions of won in subsidies per charger installation. The government budget allocated to support for public charging station expansion was "371 billion won ($278 million)" in 2024. In April 2026, the Ministry of Climate, Energy and Environment announced mid-day electricity discounts on weekends and public holidays for thousands of "home-use and public fast chargers."

=== Safety regulations ===
Although EV fires have been documented to be less frequent than common internal combustion engine cars by unit, they have sparked safety concerns in South Korea. In 2024, the Environment Ministry identified a majority of charging stations in the country as slow charging. Due to a widespread lack of overcharging monitoring at slow charging stations, the government began to mandate power line communication modems for slow charging station installations in 2025. The Seoul Metropolitan Government also began to establish charging percentage caps for "city-operated EV fast chargers in public parking lots" to prevent fires. At the beginning of 2026, South Korean insurance associations implemented mandatory liability insurance for EV charging facility accidents.

== Total EV charger statistics ==
EV chargers in South Korea
Year	Number
2015	330
2016	1,114
2017	11,323
2018	29,316
2019	44,792
2020	64,188
2021	106,701
2022	205,205

Date	Chargers	Ref.
May 2023	240,695	
July 2024	373,961	
January 2025	405,000	
