= Jang Young-sik =

South Korean economist (born 1935)

- Born: 1935 (age 90–91); Gwangju
- Citizenship: South Korea
- Education: Seoul National University; University at Albany, SUNY
- Occupation: Economist
- Employer: Hanyang University
- Known for: Korea Electric Power Company president (1998–1999)

Korean name
- Hangul: 장영식
- Hanja: 張榮植
- RR: Jang Yeongsik
- MR: Chang Yŏngsik

Jang Young-sik (Korean: 장영식; born 1935) is a South Korean economist. He was the president of the Korea Electric Power Corporation (KEPCO) from May 1998 to April 1999.

== Personal life and early career ==
Jang is a native of Gwangju. His younger brother Jang Jae-sik would become a member of National Congress for New Politics and a National Assembly member in the 1990s. He graduated from Seoul National University with a degree in metallurgical engineering, and afterwards worked in the Office of the Prime Minister as an economist. Later in the 1950s he emigrated to the U.S. and naturalised as a citizen there. He went on to the University at Albany, SUNY, where he defended a thesis on econometric modelling in 1970.

Jang returned to South Korea in 1975, where he headed an energy markets research team at the Korea Development Institute. His work there focused on electricity pricing reform. In the early 1980s, he worked at the International Bank for Reconstruction and Development, as a member of which he did consulting work for KEPCO on the role of foreign debt in its capital structure.

== As KEPCO president ==
In May 1998, President Kim Dae-jung nominated Jang as the president of KEPCO, a move which provoked some controversy. Chang Kwang-keun of the opposition Grand National Party expressed opposition to Jang's nomination, saying it was an example of Kim showing excessive favouritism towards his native Honam region; he stated that among the 35 applicants for the job there had been many people with better qualifications. There were also questions over the legal validity of Jang's nomination. According to Ministry of Commerce, Industry and Energy regulations, the president of a government-owned company is required to be a South Korean citizen. Jang had earlier acquired U.S. citizenship by naturalisation, thus automatically losing South Korean citizenship. He gave up U.S. citizenship in order to have his South Korean citizenship restored on 5 May 1998, but for a period of about two weeks after the submission of application papers on 25 April he was still legally a foreigner. A notice confirming his loss of U.S. citizenship appeared in the Federal Register as required by the Health Insurance Portability and Accountability Act in October 1998.

Yang lasted slightly less than a year in the position: on 21 April 1999, KEPCO Vice-President Yun Haeng-sun reported to the Ministry of Commerce, Energy, and Energy that Jang would formally submit his resignation in a few days. Yun stated that Jang felt he lacked sufficient organisational management skills to continue in his duties. There were mixed assessments of Jang's impact at KEPCO. A November 1999 report by government auditors gave him credit for management reforms which led to some improvement in operational efficiency. However, he was also later criticised for heavy use of his corporate expense account, as his own expenditures averaged 8.58 million per month, while KEPCO as a whole had the highest expenditures on expense account reimbursements out of all state-owned companies in 1999.

One plan Jang worked on while at KEPCO involved upgrading electricity production and transmission facilities in order to export power to North Korea, as part of Kim Dae-jung's Sunshine Policy of increasing the level of inter-Korean cooperation, but in the end the plan was never implemented. In a 2005 interview, Jang stated that it had been abandoned due to technical problems.

== Later career ==
Jang was named to an endowed chair professorship at Hanyang University's Graduate School of Industrial Economics in August 1999.

== Selected works ==
- A comparative study of interdependent and causal chain systems in econometric model-building. Doctoral dissertation. Albany: State University of New York. 1970. OCLC 753696453.
