= SK ecoplant =

South Korean renewable energy company

SK ecoplant Co., Ltd.
- Native name: 에스케이에코플랜트 주식회사
- Company type: Public
- Traded as: KRX: 003340
- Industry: Renewable energy industry
- Founded: 21 February 1962; 64 years ago
- Headquarters: Seoul, South Korea
- Products: Solar panels, offshore wind power structures
- Number of employees: 533 (2022)
- Parent: SK Group
- Website: www.skecoplant.com

SK ecoplant (Korean: SK에코플랜트) is a construction and energy company affiliated with the SK Group, established in 1962 in South Korea.

== History ==
The SK Ecoplant was founded in 1962 as Hyupwoo Industry (협우산업). It was later acquired by Seonkyung Group in 1977 and its name changed to Seonkyung Construction (선경종합건설), and then to SK Construction (SK건설) in 1984.

Since then, the company has acquired several environmental management companies, including waste incineration and landfill, and in February 2022, it acquired TES (known as SK tes), a Singapore-based IT asset disposition and electronic waste management company. In November 2021, It acquired Samkang M&T (삼강엔앰티), a shipbuilding and equipment company that had been manufacturing offshore wind power plants since the early 2010s, and incorporated it as a subsidiary, and in January 2023, the company changed its name to SK Oceanplant.

It is also well known as an apartment developer, with its brand name being SK View.

== Construction ==
This company led the financing and construction of the Eurasia Tunnel, an undersea tunnel connecting Asia and Europe in Istanbul, Turkey. The tunnel opened in December 2016, and the company will operate it until 2041.
