= H.A.V.E. Online =

2009 multiplayer online video game

- Developer(s): SK iMedia; NQ Games
- Publisher(s): Insrea; TOT; Rock Hippo Productions Ltd.; GungHo Online Entertainment; PlayMojo Kingslaim Indonesia; Softnyx Latino/Brasil; Tahadi Games; Weezor Productions
- Engine: Gamebryo with PhysX
- Platform(s): Windows
- Release: TWN: November 2009; NA: July 5, 2012 (Steam); EU: August 12, 2010 (CBT)
- Genre(s): Third-person shooter
- Mode(s): Multiplayer

H.A.V.E. Online is a massively multiplayer online game (MMO) third-person shooter cartoon-style video game. It is developed by Korean developer SK imedia. There were several versions of these games. The first version was hosted in Taiwan, followed by a Thai version. NQ Games (previously known as SK iMedia), with Rock Hippo Productions announcing that they would publish the game for North America and Europe under the name "MicroVolts". MicroVolts shutdown permanently on 9. September 2017. There are currently no running versions of the game.

== Hosting ==
There has been no word on a Korean publisher for this game until Gravity Corp announced that it will publish the game in Korea. The company has also announced a Japanese version, although no release date has been set.

Chinese video game company, Insrea, hosted the game in Taiwan. The closed beta phase was launched November 26. 2009.

Thai video game company, TOT published the game in Thailand. The service is no longer running and was shut down in 2018.

Rock Hippo Productions announced that it will publish the game in Europe and North America under the name, "MicroVolts".
