= Smart grids in South Korea =

The smart grids in South Korea constitute a platform that is re-imagining electricity grids, equipping it with technology that allows more capability, particularly in addressing the demands of the 21st century and the future. This process follows a modular approach to grid construction and focuses on the development of the IT-enabling of its electric power generation system. The country views the smart grids, along with the so-called "new energy industries", as an emergent pillar of the Korean economy.

According to Korea Electric Power Corporation (KEPCO), one of the leaders of the initiative, "smart grids would help the country use more renewable energy sources and cut overall energy consumption." The "smart" in a grid is achieved through an installed software rather than hardware, banking more on the element of intelligence for more consistent upgrades, patterns learning, and timely response to new technologies. The South Korean smart grids include the following components:

1. Smart power: the intelligent monitoring of demand, high level of fault tolerance and fast restoration in case of failures;
2. Smart service: The provision of domestic, commercial, and industrial customers with electricity tariffs and services customized according to their needs;
3. Smart place: the use of intelligence at home (e.g. smart appliances), real-time pricing, and demand management;
4. Smart transport: installation of sophisticated systems to effectively manage the connections of electric vehicles to the smart grid; and,
5. Smart renewables: the connection and use of large and diverse sources of power to the grid to ensure stability.

== Industry ==
Internet in South Korea is more robust and developed than in almost any other country, with gigabit wired service being common even in fairly rural areas. Accordingly, Korean initiatives in smart grid and Internet of things largely take reliable backhaul connectivity for granted. The country's mobile device and appliance exports also put it in the forefront of machine-to-machine communication. For instance, to deploy electric car charging technology broadly across the country required only a few deals to equip vehicles and chargers with LTE technology, plus existing technologies like submetering and two-way plugs (to facilitate the purchase of vehicle battery power for the grid, especially at peak times, as was announced in 2014).

== KEPCO initiatives and exports ==
KEPCO, as of 2014, planned to "spend US$155 million between 2015 and 2017 on developing technologies that will reduce spending on power, as well as boosting energy saving and efficiency" and set 2030 as the date to deliver universal smart grids for "power generation, distribution and consumption" and to export them to all of Southeast Asia. Its first export was to Canadian power company PowerStream with which it committed to build a pilot project in the Penetanguishene region of Ontario, suggesting it would also aggressively export this technology to North America

In 2011, KEPCO had earmarked investment of US$7.18 billion in its smart grid business to meet this 2030 goal. Most of the investment would be completed before 2020, to upgrade power transmission and distribution systems and switch meters, the company said in a statement. By early 2020 the spending of 27.5 trillion won over the next two decades on smart grids was to make electricity distribution more efficient, reduce greenhouse gas emissions and save US$26 billion in energy imports. Also, KEPCO had announced earlier in 2014 that it "would soon be buying electricity stored in car batteries through a vehicle-to-grid pilot scheme" to reduce on-peak demand generation. The government committed to change laws to smooth the vehicle-to-grid program by the end of 2014, while the state-run electricity distributor will design a new price-charging system.

== Technologies ==
In July 2015 KEPCO announced a deal with telco LGU+ to develop Internet of things technologies jointly.

== Emissions and climate goals ==
The South Korean government announced its CO_{2} reduction target for 2020. The target represents a 30% reduction from the estimated level of 2020. This goal is deemed very challenging since Korean industry had doubled its greenhouse gas emissions between 1990 and 2005, the fastest growth in the OECD. Korea has voluntarily set its 2020 emission reduction target. With this pledge, Seoul seeks to be a model for other countries including China and India who are categorized as developing countries under the Kyoto Protocol; the two countries thus have no binding obligation but to announce its reduction target by 2030.

Korea is also pursuing sustainable development while dealing with climate change. At the same time, it is shifting toward a low carbon economy and a society capable of recovering from climate change. As part of these efforts, Korea launched a Smart Grid national project to achieve green growth in a transparent, comprehensive, effective, and efficient way. This project envisions laying the foundation for a low carbon, green-growth economy by building a Smart Grid. Thus, it can serve as a yardstick to evaluate the future of Korea's green-growth economy. In light of this, Korea came up with a proactive and ambitious plan to build a Smart Grid Test-bed on Jeju Island to prove its determination in the low carbon, green-growth strategy. The island was chosen in June 2009 due to the availability of potential renewable energy sources as well as the requirement for a closed territory. The initiative aims to become the world's first "all-inclusive" test-bed and to transform Jeju as the "world's largest Smart Grid community."

To address climate change, Korea has recognized the necessity of rolling out a Smart Grid as infrastructure for the low carbon, green industry in preparation for its binding reductions of greenhouse gas emissions. With that in mind, the Korean government is implementing relevant policies and projects that can be echoed by the public. In short, Korea is pursuing the Smart Grid initiative as a national policy to achieve the vision of “Low carbon, Green growth.” In line with this, in 2009, Korea's Green Growth Committee presented "Building an Advanced Green Country"as its vision, and specified the contents of the Smart Grid. Afterwards, in November 2009, the committee collected views of experts from the industry, academia, and research institutes to outline the national roadmap.

== 2010 World Smart Grid Forum ==
Korea Smart Grid Association and Korea Smart Grid Institute hosted 2010 World Smart Grid Forum, sponsored by Ministry of Knowledge Economy and Presidential Committee on Green Growth. It was mainly held to ascertain the present of the domestic smart grid sector and to identify a future direction for development.

- Title : 2010 World Smart Grid Forum
- A Theme : The Smart Grid Implementation and Beyond
- Date : January 20–22, 2010
- Venue : Grand Ballroom, COEX, Seoul, Korea
- Hosted by : Korea Smart Grid Association, Korea Smart Grid Institute
- Sponsored by : Ministry of Knowledge Economy, Presidential Committee on Green Growth

== Korea's Smart Grid 10 Power IT Projects ==
Power IT refers to a technology that enables electric power devices and systems to become digital, environmentally friendly, and intelligent through the convergence of electric power technology and information and communication technology (ICT). It also creates high added value for electric power services. The Power IT National Program aims to develop Power IT into a driving force behind the nation's economic growth by advancing the Korean electric power and electrical industries. The program also seeks to bring innovation and higher added value to electric power services. To achieve these goals, Korea embarked on a strategic technology development program in 2005 and selected 10 projects, which have since been systematically implemented. In Feb. 2009, the implementation of these projects was connected with the Smart Grid Initiative, a core element of Seoul's Green Growth Strategy. The Power IT Program is expected to develop the electric power and electrical industries. Thus, once these 10 projects are complete, these two industries will play a critical role in propelling national economic growth and delivering innovative and high value-added electric power services.

There are ten Power IT Project Areas:

1. Development of Korean Energy Management System
2. IT Based Control System for Bulk Power Transmission
3. Development of Intelligent Transmission Network Monitoring and Operating System
4. Development of a Digital Technology-based Next-Generation Substation System
5. Development of Intelligent Distribution Management System
6. The Development of Power Active Telematics System for Facility Monitoring
7. Development of a Consumer Integrated Resource Management System for High Value-Added Power Services
8. Development of PLC Ubiquitous Technology
9. Development of Power Semiconductor Technology for Distributed Generation and its Application in Industrial Inverters
10. Development of integration EMS for the microgrid and application technology to real site

== Korea Smart Grid Institute ==
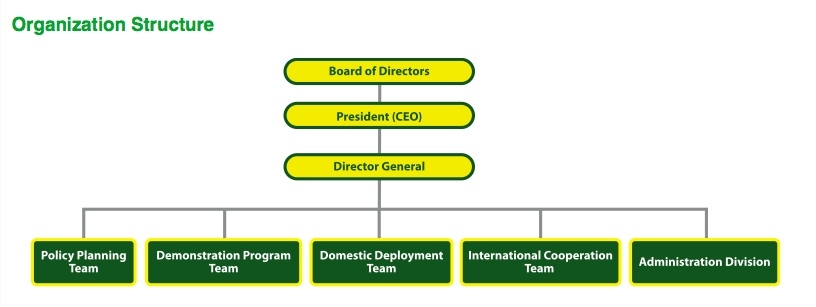
KSGI organizational structure

Korea Smart Grid Institute (KSGI) was launched in August 2009 as the secretariat of Smart Grid Initiative and projects in Korea. The Smart Grid Initiative mainly targets the modernization of electric power systems. Today, many countries around the world recognize the necessity of enhancing energy efficiency, tackling climate change, and promoting green energy.

This received very high level attention: President Lee Myung-Bak announced on August 15, 2008, Korea's new national vision “Green Growth, Low Carbon.” To implement this vision KSGI was established, to manage comprehensively the government's Smart Grip roadmap; operate a Smart Grid test-bed, pilot city; and extend other policy support for Smart Grid related issues. By late 2014 these objectives were substantially realized and Korea was exporting smart grid technologies to other countries.

KSGI aims to explore projects on the development of technology that encompasses the convergence of electric power and IT; support cooperation among industry, academia and research institute; pursue international cooperation and certification, standardization as well as security; and ultimately achieve low carbon green society to better the lives of people and improve the environment by building a nationwide Smart Grid.
