= Chey Tae-won =

South Korean businessperson (born 1960)

- 최태원
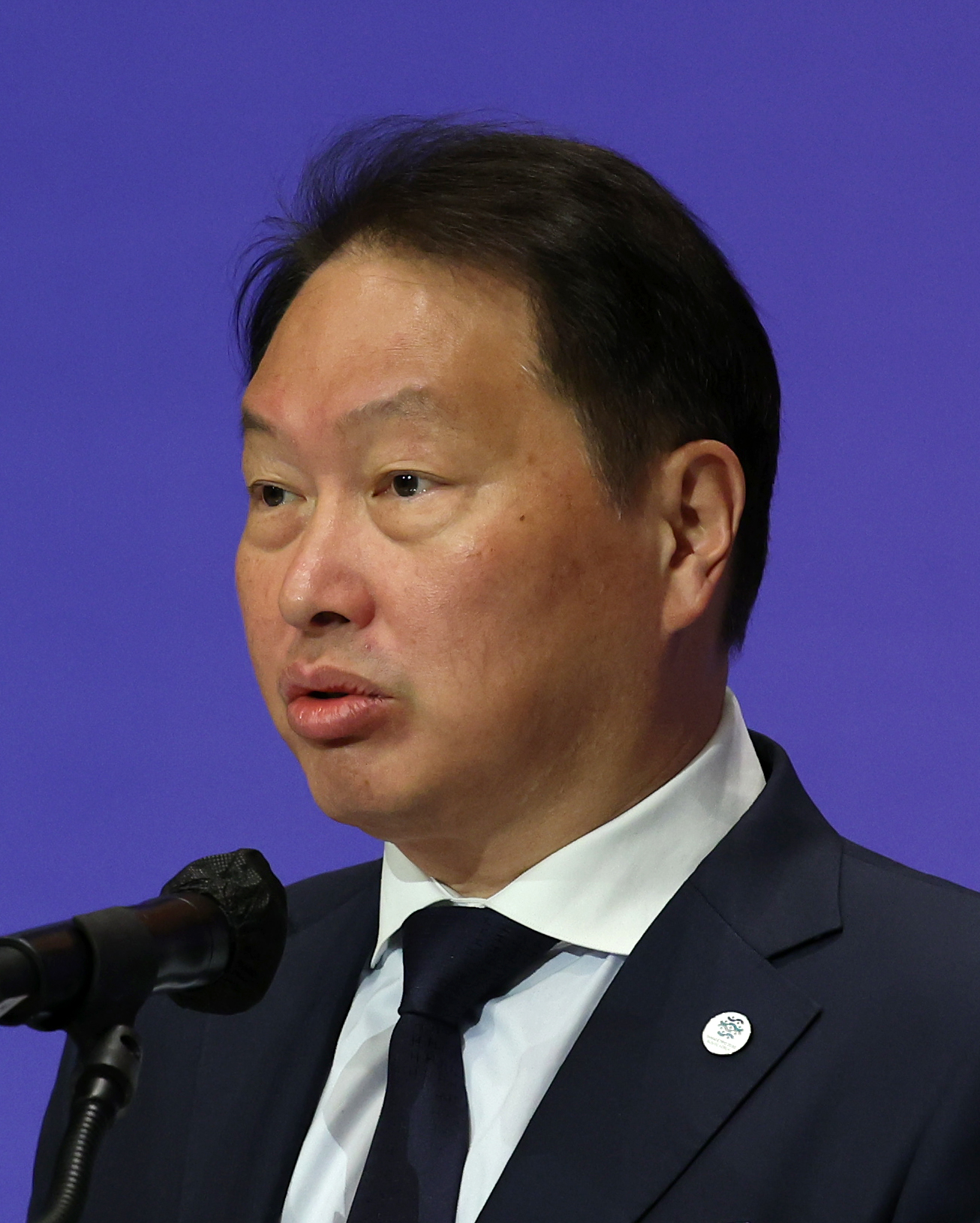
- Chey in 2023
- Born: December 3, 1960 (age 65); Suwon, Gyeonggi Province, South Korea
- Other name: Anthony Chey
- Education: Korea University (BS)
- Occupation: Businessman
- Years active: 1998–present
- Title: Chairperson of SK Group; Chairperson of Korea Chamber of Commerce and Industry (KCCI)
- Children: 4
- Father: Chey Jong-hyun

Korean name
- Hangul: 최태원
- Hanja: 崔泰源
- RR: Choe Taewon
- MR: Ch'oe T'aewŏn

Chey Tae-won (Korean: 최태원; Hanja: 崔泰源; born December 3, 1960) is a South Korean billionaire businessman and the chairman of SK Group, the country's second largest conglomerate, that includes 186 subsidiaries such as SK Telecom, SK Hynix, and SK Innovation. Chey has been the chairman of the Korea Chamber of Commerce and Industry (KCCI) since March 2021.

Chey is among the richest people in South Korea. In July 2026, Forbes estimated his net worth at US$4.7 billion.

== Early life ==
Chey was born on December 3, 1960, in Suwon, Gyeonggi Province, South Korea as the eldest son of Chey Jong-hyun, chairman of Sunkyung Group (now SK Group). Chey attended Korea University where he received a bachelor's degree in physics, and later studied for a PhD in economics at University of Chicago, US, but did not finish. He joined SK Corp. as a manager, served as executive director of SK America, executive director of SK Corp. and vice president of SK Corp. After the death of Chey Jong-hyun, the former chairman, he took the post of SK chairman at the early age of 38 without a management dispute. It is reported that Chey Yoon-won, the son of founder Chey Jong-gun, appointed Chey Tae-won as the group leader, saying, "Tae-won is the best among our brothers."

== Career ==
Chey has been chairman of the SK Group since 1998. Chey has held a number of leadership positions across SK's various operating companies. He had been chairman of SK Innovation since 2011 and chairman of SK Hynix since 2012. He has been chairman of SK Telecom since February 2022. SK Group grew into South Korea's second largest corporate group during his tenure.

In January 2012, Chey was indicted of embezzling over $40 million from SK companies to cover up his trading losses. He denies any wrongdoing. In January 2013, Chey was found guilty, and was sentenced to 4 years in prison by the Seoul District Court. He was incarcerated near Seoul until his pardon in August 2015.

Chey has received a number of awards. This includes the "Global Leaders for Tomorrow" award from the World Economic Forum (1999); Co-chair, East Asia Economic Summit 2002 in Malaysia, World Economic Forum (2002); Member, Brookings International Advisory Council (IAC) (2010); Working Group Convener, G20 Business Summit (2010); and two-time President of the Korea Handball Federation (2008, 2016).

In May 2022, Chey was appointed by the presidential transition team as the head of the civilian committee to support Busan's bid to host the World Expo in 2030.

== Personal life ==
Chey was married to Roh Soh-yeong, art director and daughter of former South Korean president Roh Tae-woo. They have been separated since September 2011, and in December 2015, he announced his intention to divorce. It was revealed that Chey wanted a "clean end" to his 27-year marriage after fathering a child with another woman named Kim Hee-young, who is now Chey's long-term partner. In December 2022, the Seoul Family Court approved the divorce, and Chey kept most of his shares. As part of the divorce, a court ordered Chey to pay $1 billion to his former wife. The settlement was overturned in October 2025 by the Supreme Court of Korea, which ordered a review after finding a miscalculation that increased the value of the couple's assets. However, in the same ruling, the Supreme Court officially finalized the divorce and a 2 billion won alimony payment, legally dissolving their marriage.

In a retrial in July 2026, the Seoul High Court's Family Division 1 ordered Chey to pay ₩944 billion ($644 million) to Roh, which is 436.8 billion less than the ₩1.3808 trillion ($946 million) ordered before. In August 2026, Chey appealed this latest decision, sending the ongoing property division case back to the Supreme Court. The divorce has been termed the "divorce of the century" in South Korean media.
