= Korea Electric Power Corporation =

South Korean utility company

- Type: Public State-owned Enterprise
- Traded as: KRX: 015760; NYSE: KEP
- Industry: Electric utility
- Founded: 26 January 1898; 128 years ago (as Seoul Electric Company); 1 July 1961; 65 years ago (as Korea Electric Company)
- Founder: Korean government
- Headquarters: Naju, South Jeolla, South Korea
- Key people: Kim Dong-cheol (President and CEO)
- Products: Electrical power
- Services: Electricity distribution
- Revenue: ▲KRW 88.22 trillion (2023)
- Operating income: ▼KRW 4.54 trillion (2023)
- Net income: ▼KRW 4.71 trillion (2023)
- Total assets: ▲KRW 239.71 trillion (2023)
- Total equity: ▲KRW 37.26 trillion (2023)
- Owner: Korea Development Bank (32.9%); Government of South Korea (18.2%); National Pension Service (7.51%)
- Number of employees: 23,138 (2023)
- Website: kepco.co.kr

- Korea Electric Power Corporation
- Hangul: 한국전력공사
- Hanja: 韓國電力公社
- RR: Hanguk jeollyeok gongsa
- MR: Han'guk chŏllyŏk kongsa

Korea Electric Power Corporation, better known as KEPCO (Korean: 켑코) or Hanjeon (Korean: 한전), is the largest electric utility in South Korea, responsible for the generation, transmission and distribution of electricity and the development of electric power projects including those in nuclear power, wind power and coal. KEPCO, through its subsidiaries, is responsible for 96% of Korea's electricity generation as of 2023. The South Korean government (directly and indirectly) owns a 51.10% share of KEPCO. Together with its affiliates and subsidiaries, KEPCO has an installed capacity of 83,235 MW. KEPCO has ranked in the top 300 of the Fortune Global 500 ranking of the world's largest companies. KEPCO is a member of the World Energy Council, the World Nuclear Association and the World Association of Nuclear Operators. As of September 2024, KEPCO possesses an AA credit rating with S&P Ratings, while Moody's has assigned KEPCO an Aa2 stable rating.

Originally located in Samseong-dong, Seoul, KEPCO headquarters was relocated to the city of Naju in South Jeolla Province in August 2014 as part of a government decentralization program. The move, which has been in the works for years has been controversial. Dong-Cheol Kim is the president and CEO of KEPCO.

== History ==
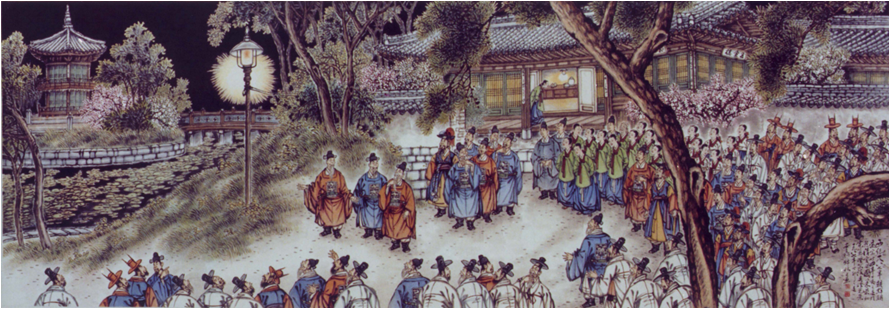
Korea's first electric light being turned on at Gyeongbokgung in 1887

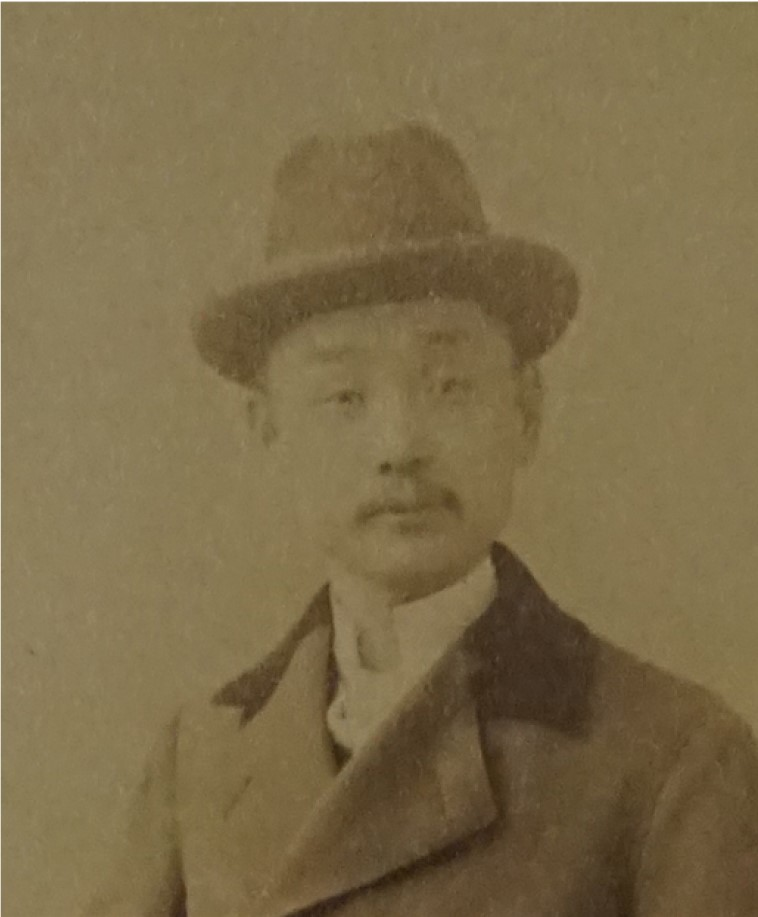
Lee Chae-Yeon, the president of Hanseong Electric Company circa 1898

KEPCO traces its origins to Hanseong Jeongi Hoesa (Seoul Electric Company), founded in 1898 during the Korean Empire. It was wholly invested by King Gojong, who had a special interest in implementing electrical business in Korea; internally, the imperial-invested company was funded through Hanseong Electric's president Lee Chae-yeon. Subsequently, American businessmen Henry Collbran and Harry Rice Bostwick were contracted to manage Seoul's streetcars, lights, and telephone systems.

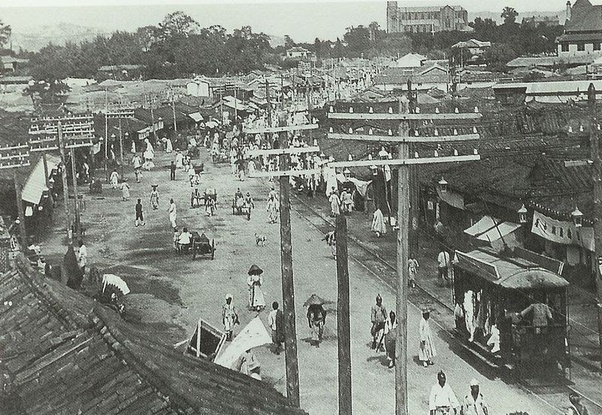
An image of Seoul in utilisation of electrical infrastructure ca 1900

Hanseong Electric completed its first power plant in 1899 at Dongdaemun. By the end of that year, the company had succeeded in launching its streetcar service, and soon after had turned on its first electric lights in Seoul's Jongno Street. With a monopoly on Seoul's electricity and streetcar systems, Hanseong Electric continued to build up its public lighting network into the turn of the century, and began offering electrical service to private homes as well.

Logo of Korea Electric Company and later KEPCO between 1961 and 1986

The company had also established a movie theater of which could be travelled to via the main line, a streetcar line that went through downtown Seoul and multiple districts; experts recall that opening an electric movie theater was part of a marketing ploy to promote the convenience of trains and attract tram passengers. A total of three lines were constructed, all of which connecting 5 different districts of Seoul (Seodaemun-Jongno-Dongdaemun-Cheongnyangni (Main Line), Jongno-Namdaemun-Yongsan (Yongsan Line), and Seodaemun-Namdaemun (Uiju Line)). Up until the Eulsa Treaty, the company had proved successful in expansion. Supporting the expansion included the enthusiastic support of Allen, a U.S. Legation official, including Lee Chae-yeon (the president), William F. Sands, a former secretary appointed as an internal adviser to the palace, and the active support of pro-American officials in Korea, including Lee Yoon-yong, Min Young-hwan, Min Sang-ho, and Kang Seok-ho.

The company's president Lee Chae-yeon, who was a pro-American leader, died in August 1900. Upon this, non pro-American Lee Yong-ik joined the executives of Hanseong Electric Company, tightly controlling the company's funding and strictly blocking Collbran's business expansion plans. Claiming it broke the mortgage contract, Collbran responded in demand for the repayment of debts related to the railroad construction project and pressed on profits. Lee Yong-ik refuted Collbran's request based on the "Brown Paper," which stated that Collbran's claims were over-inflated; this caused tensions to rise. Soon, a new contract was signed to settle the debt dispute of Hanseong Electric Company. Gojong mutually withdrew all demands between the two sides, and in February 1904 established Hanmi Electric Company (韓美電氣會社) to hand over all rights and assets. The management of Hanmi Electric Company was held by Collbran, and 50% of the company's shares were acquired by Gojong which increased his involvement and management of the company as the majority shareholder.

However, after Japan had won the Russo-Japanese War in September 1905, Japan had expanded their influence in the Korean Empire with the signing of the Eulsa Treaty. This included the process of absorbing, dismantling, and taking over various reform projects that the Korean Empire had pursued independently. The electric power industry, the basic industry of modern commercial and industrial development, was no exception. In June 1909, Collbran sold Hanseong Electric to a Japanese business named Ilhanwasa Co., Ltd

The announcement of the Chōsen Electricity Control Decree by the Colonial Korean government in March 1943 saw the integration of several electric companies into the Korea Electric Power Company. The Korea Electric Company (KECO), established through the integration of the Korea Electric Power Company and two distribution companies, Gyeongsung Electric Company and South Korea Electric Company, opened on 1 July 1961. In 1982, KECO became a wholly government owned entity and was renamed the Korea Electric Power Corporation (KEPCO).

KEPCO was listed on the Korea Stock Exchange on 10 August 1989 and later in 1994 on the New York Stock Exchange. In 1996, KEPCO was named the prime contractor for the multinational Korean Peninsula Energy Development Organization (KEDO) project to construct a light water reactor nuclear power plant in North Korea, a project which was eventually abandoned in 2006. Following a push by the Korean government to restructure Korea's power industry which began in the mid-1990s, the Act on the Promotion of Restructuring the Electric Power Industry was proclaimed on 23 December 2000, after which the electricity generation business was split up into Korea Hydro & Nuclear Power, a subsidiary responsible for nuclear & hydro power generation, and five thermal power generation companies: Korea South-East Power, Korea Midland Power, Korea Western Power, Korea Southern Power, and Korea East-West Power.

In October 2012, Korea Deposit Insurance Corporation sold its 3.6% of its stake in KEPCO for a fee of around $550 million.

== Timeline ==
- March 1887 – Turned the first electric lights on (Geongchung Palace inside Gyeongbok Palace)
- January 1898 – Founded Hansung Electric Company
- May 1899 - First power plant was established in Dongdaemun
- May 1899 - First electric trolley car line was opened between Seodaemun and Dongdaemun
- April 1900 – Lighted three streetlamps in Jongno by Hansung Electric Company (first-ever lighting in public area)
- December 1900 - Yongsan trolley car line opened
- July 1901 - Uiju trolley car line opened
- June 1905 - First hydroelectric power plant, Unsan Hydropower, was completed
- March 1944 – Completed Supung Hydro Power Plant (600,000 kW)
- July 1961 – Established Korea Electric Power Company with Electricity Enterprises Act (three electric companies were merged)
- April 1964 – Cleared limited electric power transmission for the first time since national liberation
- December 1965 – Declared Act on the Promotion of Electrification in Agricultural and Fishing Villages
- May 1968 – Exceeded one million kW in electric power generation capacity
- April 1978 – Completed 1st unit of Kori Nuclear Power Plant (587,000 kW)
- January 1982 – Launched Korea Electric Power Corporation
- August 1989 – Listed on the Korea Stock Exchange as people's share No.2
- October 1994 – Listed on the New York Stock Exchange for the first time
- February 1995 – Won bid to operate Malaya power plant in the Philippines
- August 1997 – Broke ground for KEDO nuclear power plant construction
- July 2000 – Exceeded 40 million kW in maximum demand electric power
- April 2001 – Spun the business off into six power generation subsidiaries
- June 2002 – Completed Ilijan Gas combined cycle power plant, the largest in the Philippines
- November 2005 – Increased voltage to 220 V for distribution line, and commenced electric power supply to Gaesung Industrial Complex
- June 2006 – Awarded Edison Award
- September 2006 – Launched independent project division
- December 2009 – Exported nuclear power plant to overseas for the first time (UAE)
- December 2011 – Selected as corrupt-free institute for six years in a row in anti-corruption evaluation, and ranked first in customer satisfaction for 13 years in a row
- February 2012 – Completed Al Qatrana power plant in Jordan
- December 2012 – Ranked first in the public sector for 14 years in a row
- October 2013 – Hosted the World Energy Council, the world's largest and most influential energy event, in Daegu
- December 2014 – Relocated to Bitgaram Innovation City, opening the Energy Valley Era
- October 2015 – Successfully held Bitgaram International Exposition on Electric Power Technology (BIXPO 2015)
- May 2016 – Selected as the top electric utility in the 2016 Platts
- August 2016 – Won a 2016 CIO 100 Award, a first for a Korean company
- October 2016 – Signed a joint venture agreement for the operation of the UAE power plant

== Subsidiaries ==
KEPCO comprises six power generation companies and four subsidiaries in related business areas. It also owns a stake in four affiliated companies.

=== Power generation companies ===
- Korea Hydro & Nuclear Power (KHNP): operates 25 nuclear power plants and 37 hydropower plants in Korea which account for 30,054 MW in total capacity as of Dec. 2023.
- Korea South-East Power (KOEN): with 9,363 MW in total capacity (as of Dec. 2023), KOSEP operates the Samcheonpo Thermal Power Site Division and the Yeongheung Thermal Power Plant.
- Korea Midland Power (KOMIPO): operates the Boryeong Thermalelectric Power Plant Site Division and the Yeongheung Thermal Power Plant, and possesses 10,775 MW in total installed capacity as of Dec. 2023.
- Korea Western Power: operates the Taean Thermal Power Plant and manages a total installed capacity of 11,872 MW via 10 coal-fired units and 22 LNG combined cycle units as of Dec. 2023.
- Korea Southern Power (KOSPO): operates the Hadong Thermal Power Site Division and manages 11,495 MW in total installed capacity as of Dec. 2023.
- Korea East-West Power: operates the Dangjin and Honam Coal Fired Power Plants, and manages a total of 9,579 MW in installed capacity as of Dec. 2023.

=== Other subsidiaries ===
- KEPCO E&C: KEPCO Engineering & Construction (KEPCO E&C) is a comprehensive engineering company which develops and designs nuclear and thermal power plants. KEPCO owns a 51.00% share of KEPCO E&C.
- KEPCO Nuclear Fuel (KNF): KEPCO Nuclear Fuel specializes in the design and manufacture of nuclear fuel, as well as fuel engineering services. KNF is the world's only producer of nuclear fuel for both light-water (LWR) and heavy water (HWR) reactors. KEPCO's share of KNF stands at 96.36%.
- Korea Plant Service & Engineering: Korea Plant Service & Engineering is 51.00% owned by KEPCO. It provides maintenance services for Korea's power generation, transmission, transformation and industrial facilities.
- Korea Electric Power Data Network: 100% wholly owned by KEPCO, Korea Electric Power Data Network provides IT services covering the full range of electric power from generation and transmission to distribution and sales.

=== Affiliated companies ===
- Korea Electric Power Industrial Development Corporation
- Korea Gas Corporation
- Korea District Heating Corporation
- LG UPlus Corporation

=== Overseas office ===
- Abu Dhabi Branch Office - Muroor Road(4th st), al Mamoura, B Po Box 112010, Abu Dhabi, UAE
- KEPCO China Office - 2702, Tower A, Tianyuangang Center No.C2, Dongsanhuanbeilu, Chaoyang District, Beijing, 100027, China
- KEPCO New York Office - 400 Kelby Street, Parker Plaza 7th Floor, Fort Lee, NJ 07024, U.S.A
- KEPCO Tokyo Office - 3rd Fl. Toranomon Denki BLDG, 2-8-1 Minakoku, Tokyo, Japan
- KEPCO Hanoi Office - 1112, Charm Vit Tower, 117 Tran Duy Hung, Cau Giay, Hanoi, Vietnam
- KEPCO Johannesburg Office - 18th floor, Sandton City Tower Corner Rivonia Road & 5th St. Sandton P.O. Box 786703, Sandton City 2146, South Africa
- KEPCO London Office - 36 Old Jewry, London EC2R 8DD, UK
- KEPCO Iran Office - 6th floor Armaghan Tower, No. 13, Eastern Armaghan St., Africa Ave, Tehran, Iran
- KEPCO Dominican Republic Office - ESD Building, No. 63, Mario Garcia Alvarado St., Ens. Quisqueya, Santo Domingo, Dominican Republic

== Operations ==
=== Domestic activities ===
In Korea, KEPCO primarily provides electricity to include industrial, commercial, residential, educational and agricultural customers. As of 31 December 2023, KEPCO had a total installed generating capacity of 83,235MW produced by 794 generation units including nuclear, oil, coal, liquified natural gas, hydro, wind and solar sources. The length of KEPCO's transmission lines stood at 35,596 circuit kilometers as of end-2023.

=== Nuclear business ===
KEPCO's involvement in the nuclear energy sector ranges from design and engineering of the nuclear power plant to nuclear fuel, commissioning and operation, maintenance and decommissioning. Construction of KEPCO nuclear power plants is undertaken by major Korean construction companies, while the manufacture of key elements of a nuclear power plant is done by companies including Doosan Heavy Industries & Construction and Westinghouse Electric Company. In 2009, KEPCO won a bid to construct four units of the APR-1400 reactor in the United Arab Emirates at Barakah.

In October 2013, a vice-president of KEPCO, amongst about 100 people, was indicted for falsifying safety documents.

In 2017, KEPCO showed interest in taking a stake in the Moorside Nuclear Power Station in the UK, though did not proceed with the project.

In October 2020, KEPCO signed a memorandum of understanding with Daewoo Shipbuilding & Marine Engineering to develop a floating nuclear power plant based on the BANDI-60 60 MWe small modular reactor, which has been under development since 2016.

In 2026, KEPCO closed a €12 billion contract to build two APR-1400 nuclear reactors at the Czech Republic’s Dukovany plant, with a combined capacity of 2,800 MW.

=== Overseas activities ===
KEPCO's overseas forays started in 1993 when the company was awarded a technical consulting contract for maintenance on the Guangdong nuclear power plant in China. At present, KEPCO is involved in projects in 18 countries around the world. In 1996, KEPCO entered the Philippines power market when it was awarded the contract for the refurbishment and operation of the Malaya thermal power plant. In 1996, KEPCO won the bid to construct the Ilijan gas-fired combined cycle power plant, a 1,200MW build-operate-transfer project. Today, KEPCO operates four power plants in the Philippines, including the Naga Power Plant Complex and the Cebu Circulating Fluidized Bed Combustion Power Plant, while the company's operations account for 12% of the country's installed generation capacity. In April 2012 KEPCO contracted ICPO to raise $400m to buy into Boutique Coal in Australia to benefit from cheap coal briquettes which improved burn efficiency by up to 30% reduced SO_{x} and NO_{x} by >80% and reduced CO_{2}.

In the area of transmission and distribution consultation, KEPCO has undertaken projects in Myanmar, Cambodia, Vietnam, Indonesia, Libya, Ukraine, Paraguay and Egypt. KEPCO entered the wind power industry in China with its involvement in the Gansu wind project, on which the first stage of construction began in 2007. KEPCO also holds an equity share in wind projects in Inner Mongolia and Riaoning, as well as in China's Shanxi Province. In 2010, a KEPCO-led consortium including Samsung C&T and Korean firm Techint was awarded a contract to build and operate the Norte II combined cycle gas power plant in the Mexican state of Chihuahua. In 2005, KEPCO began supplying electricity to the Kaesong Industrial Region in North Korea.

In 2011 KEPCO took a 40% stake in the Jamaican utility company Jamaica Public Service, in a partnership with Marubeni.

Among the latest overseas projects undertaken by KEPCO was the construction of the Ukudu Power Plant in Guam. The 198-megawatt (MW) combined-cycle power plant was officially commissioned for commercial operations in 2025.

=== Resources development ===
In order to raise its fuel self-sufficiency rate to 60% by 2020, in 2010, KEPCO acquired the Bylong Coal Mine in Australia from Anglo American PLC. Also in 2010, KEPCO bought a 20% stake in Bayan Resources in Indonesia, thus allowing the company to raise its coal self-sufficiency rate by 7 million tons annually from 2015. In 2009, KEPCO bought a 1.5% stake in Indonesia's Adaro Energy, thus securing 3 million tons of coal annually. Regarding uranium procurement, in 2009, KEPCO acquired a 17% share of Denison Mines Corp. in Canada, as well as a 10% stake in Areva SA's Imouraren uranium mine in Niger. In 2010, KEPCO signed an agreement with Areva to jointly develop uranium mines.

=== Smart grid ===
In early 2010, KEPCO announced it would invest over US$7 billion in its smart grid business by 2030 to make electricity distribution more efficient and decrease Korea's greenhouse gas emissions. KEPCO is one of the 168 Korean and foreign companies taking part in the Jeju Smart Grid Demonstration Project, begun following the announcement of Korea's National Smart Grid Roadmap in 2009. In June 2011, it was announced that KEPCO would collaborate with IBM to build a Total Operations Center at the Jeju Smart Grid Test-Bed Demonstration Complex.

== See also ==
- Jang Young-sik, KEPCO president from May 1998–April 1999
- Energy in South Korea
- Nuclear power in South Korea
- Smart grids in South Korea
- Jeju Smart Grid Demonstration Project in Korea
- Economy of South Korea
- Environment of South Korea
- Lists of public utilities
- Electric vehicle charging industry of South Korea
