= SK Innovation =

South Korean energy and chemical company

SK Innovation Co., Ltd.

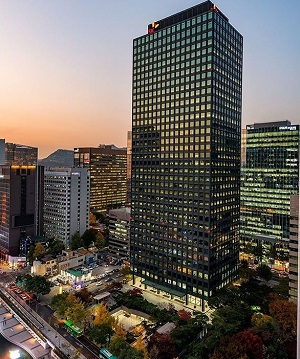
- Native name: 에스케이이노베이션 주식회사
- Type: Public, Holding
- Traded as: KRX: 096770
- Industry: Petroleum, Batteries, Energy Services
- Founded: 2007; 19 years ago
- Headquarters: Seoul, South Korea
- Area served: Worldwide
- Key people: Chey Tae-won (Chairman); Choo Hyeong-wook (CEO); Jang Yong-ho (Executive President)
- Parent: SK Inc.
- Subsidiaries: SK Energy; SK Geo Centric; SK On; SK Incheon Petrochem; SK IE Technology; SK Earthon
- Website: www.skinnovation.com

SK Innovation Co., Ltd. (Korean: 에스케이이노베이션 주식회사) is an intermediate holding company of SK Group engaged in petroleum, alternative energy, and oil exploration. It runs its business through six major subsidiaries, including SK Energy, SK Geo Centric, SK On, SK Incheon Petrochem, SK IE Technology and SK Earthon.

== History ==
SK Energy was established in 2007 by splitting South Korea's top refiner SK Corporation into an energy operation and holding company. SK Energy handled the energy and chemical businesses, while SK Holdings was in charge of investing in subsidiaries and the life science sector.

SK Innovation was created through a restructuring of SK Energy in 2011. The original SK Energy has renamed itself SK Innovation after spinning off its oil refining, lubricants, and chemical businesses. In the beginning, SK Innovation has set up three fully owned units, including SK Energy (a newly founded company operating crude oil refining business), SK Lubricants (now SK Enmove), and SK Global Chemical (now SK Geo Centric). After two years, SK Innovation spun off SK Energy's Incheon refinery complex and oil trading division and launched SK Incheon Petrochem and SK Trading International.

On March 31, 2017, SK Innovation said that the electric vehicle battery plant it had in China had been closed since January of that year, after "Chinese joint venture partners halted production for no obvious reason." On March 21, 2018, SK Innovation announced the acquisition of U.S. shale oil and gas company Longfellow Nemaha.

In 2019, the company decided to spin off its material division and established SK IE Technology. On 1 October 2021, SK Innovation officially completed the spin-off of its battery business, which is called 'SK On'. In the first half of 2022, SK On is ranked fifth in the world with a market share of 7 per cent according to SNE research. In September 2021, Ford Motor Company and SK Innovation announced a joint venture to manufacture batteries in Kentucky and Tennessee for Ford vehicles. On 11 December 2025, SK said that it had decided to end its joint venture with Ford.

== Corporate governance ==
Shareholder	Stake (%)	Flag
SK	34.45%	South Korea
National Pension Service	7.14%	South Korea
Employee Stock Ownership Association	1.10%	South Korea

== Subsidiaries ==
Subsidiary	Revenue (KRW)	Stake (%)
SK Energy	43,625.4 billion	100%
SK Incheon Petrochem	10,116.5 billion	100%
SK Geocentric	11,337.2 billion	100%
SK IE Technology	319.9 billion	61.2%
SK On	8,469.6 billion	89.5%
SK Earthon	175.7 billion	100%

In January 2011, the SK Innovation system was launched, with the oil and chemical businesses spun off. In July 2013, the company restructured into an independent management system, dividing into two business units—E&P (Exploration & Production) and B&I (Batteries and Materials)—and five subsidiaries: SK Energy, SK Global Chemical, SK Lubricants (now SK Enmove), SK Incheon Petrochem, and SK Trading International. On October 1, 2021, the remaining two business units—batteries and oil exploration—were spun off into SK On and SK Earthon, respectively.

== Controversies ==
In 2019, South Korean electric vehicle battery manufacturer LG Chem sued SK Innovation with the U.S. International Trade Commission (ITC) for misappropriation of trade secrets by hiring former employees. LG Chem requested an import ban from the ITC for SK Innovation's U.S. lithium-ion batteries and infrastructure technology. The ITC sided with LG Chem and issued a limited 10-year exclusion order prohibiting imports into the United States of some lithium-ion batteries by SK Innovation. In the end, SK Innovation agreed to pay LG Chem $1.8 billion in cash and royalties to avert the import ban.

== See also ==
- SK Group
- BlueOval SK
- List of electric-vehicle-battery manufacturers
- Battery industry of South Korea
- Jeju United FC, a South Korean professional football club owned by SK Energy
