= SK Group =

South Korean conglomerate

- Logo used since 2005

- The SK Group Headquarters in January 2014
- Native name: 에스케이그룹
- Type: Private
- Industry: Conglomerate
- Founded: 8 April 1953; 73 years ago
- Founder: Chey Jong-gun
- Headquarters: Seoul, South Korea
- Area served: Worldwide
- Key people: Chey Tae-won (Chairman & CEO); Cho Dae-sik (Chairman of the SUPEX Council (de facto head))
- Products: Energy and chemicals, telecommunications, information technology, trading and services, semiconductors
- Revenue: 205 Trillion 675.2 Billion KRW ($141.0 Billion USD) (2024.12)
- Operating income: 27 Trillion 138.5 Billion KRW ($18.6 Billion USD) (2024.12)
- Net income: 18 Trillion 359.5 Billion KRW ($12.6 Billion USD) (2024.12)
- Total assets: 362 Trillion 961.9 Billion KRW ($248.8 Billion USD) (2024.12)
- Number of employees: 117,590 (2024.12)
- Subsidiaries: SK Inc.; SK Hynix; SK Square; SK Telecom; SK Innovation
- Website: www.sk.com/en/

SK Group (Korean: SK그룹; 에스케이그룹) is a South Korean multinational manufacturing and services conglomerate headquartered in Seoul. A chaebol (Korean family-owned conglomerate), SK Group is the second largest such conglomerate by revenue in South Korea, after Samsung Group. Through a number of subsidiaries, it is engaged in various businesses, including manufacture of AI semiconductors, flash memory, deep tech investment and miscellaneous information technology, chemicals and petrochemicals, as well as providing telecommunications services worldwide among its other less notable ventures.

The conglomerate is composed of 186 subsidiaries and affiliates that share the SK brand name and the group's management culture, named SKMS (SK Management System). It changed its name from Sunkyong Group (선경그룹; 鮮京그룹) to SK Group in 1998. The group is controlled by the estate of Chey Tae-won through a holding company, SK Inc. The cornerstone of SK Group is its energy and chemicals division.

== History ==
=== Formation and early production ===
As with many other chaebols, SK Group's chairmanship was 'inherited' from father to son: from its late founder Chey Jong-hyon to its present chairman Chey Tae-won (eldest son). Chey Tae-won was married to the daughter of the former South Korean President Roh Tae-woo until 2015.

SK Group began when the current founders acquired Sunkyong Textiles from the South Korean government as abandoned property of Japan in 1953, following the Korean war armistice. That company, itself, had been formed during the period of Japanese rule as a joint venture between two Japanese companies: Senman Chutan (鮮滿綢緞, Korean: 선만주단, English meaning: ‘Korea / Manchuria Silk and Satin’) and Kyoto Orimono (京都織物, Korean: 경도직물, English meaning: ‘Kyoto Textiles’). Thus, the two Chinese characters which comprise the word Sunkyong (鮮京) derive from words meaning "Korea" and "Kyoto", respectively (more specifically, 鮮 represents Joseon (朝鮮) and contributes the S of SK, while 京 represents Kyoto (京都) and contributes the K of SK).

In 1958, the company manufactured Korea's first polyester fiber on company grounds. It established Sunkyong Fibers Ltd. in July 1969, and started to produce original yarn. In 1973, SK then established Sunkyong Oil, beginning a vertical integration strategy to manage production, "From Petroleum to Fibers". That same year, the company acquired the Walkerhill Hotel.

In 1976, Sunkyong Corporation received an international trading company license from the Indian government. In December 1980 SK purchased privately run Korea National Oil, making it Korea's fifth largest conglomerate. In January 1988, crude oil was imported for processing to Korea from Yemen's Marib oil field.

=== 1990s to 2000s ===
In June 1994, SK entered Korea's telecommunications business by becoming Korea Mobile Telecommunication Service's largest shareholder. In January 1996, SK Telecom launched Korea's first commercial CDMA cellular phone service in Incheon and Bucheon. In 1998, Management re-branded Sunkyong to SK. In 1999, SK Chemicals developed third-generation (non cross resistant) platinum-complex anti-cancer agent. Also, by focusing its research and development efforts on life sciences, SK Corporation developed YKP1358, a new drug candidate for schizophrenia, in 2003. In 2002, SK Telecom successfully launched the world's first commercial CDMA 1X EV-DO technology, allowing it to offer 3G telecommunications service. In 2004, SK Telecom enabled satellite DMB service by deploying the world's first DMB satellite. Moreover, in 2006, SK began revitalizing the 3.5-generation mobile phone market and in the following year, completed the construction of the national HSDPA network. In May 2006, SK Telecom started the world's first commercial 3.5-generation HSDPA service, featuring high-quality video telephony and data transmission, and global roaming access.

In 2005, SK Networks opened China's first two wholly foreign-owned, gas stations in Shenyang. Then, after exploring Brazilian mining area BM-C-8, SK Corporation developed an oil field where it confirmed the existence of more than 50 million barrels of oil deposits. SK Gas began developing resources overseas when it participated in two mining areas to the west of Russia's Kamchatka peninsula in March 2006. In early 2006, SK Networks also developed Ecol-Green, a biodegradable plastic material. Incheon Oil officially started operations using the SK name in March 2006. SK Energy is currently engaged in 27 oil fields in 15 countries worldwide. SKC imported propylene oxide (PO, a chemical used in manufacturing polyurethane) production technology from Germany in May 2006. It is scheduled to produce 100,000 tons of PO from 2008.

At the end of 2005, SK Corp. developed a lithium-ion battery separator (LiBS) for the first time in Korea, and started selling the product in 2006. In July 2007, SK Group adopted a holding company structure. Under the re-organization, SK's main entity, SK Corporation, was split into an investment company, now SK Inc. and an operating company, now SK Energy. The subsidiary companies that now operate under the central SK Inc. umbrella include: SK Energy, SK Telecom, SK Networks, SKC, SK E&S, SK Shipping and K Power. SK acquired Hynix for US$3 billion in February 2012, rebranding it to SK Hynix.

=== Recent history ===
In February 2017, SK acquired the polyethylene acrylic acid business of Dow Chemical Company for $370 million, and planned to increase battery production capacity from 1.9 to 3.9 GWh per year at the end of 2018, supplying Kia and Mercedes.

In July 2022, SK Group announced a $22 billion investment in the United States semiconductor, green energy bioscience and other technology industries. In total, SK Group will invest over $52 billion in the United States by 2025.

SK Networks said August 20, 2024, it has sold its rental car unit for 820 billion won (US$618 million) to a Singapore-based private equity fund. In November 2024, SK Group Chairman Chey Tae-won was appointed chairman of the board of directors of Soldigm, SK Hynix's U.S.-based NAND flash memory unit. On Dec. 23, 2024, SK sold 85 percent of its subsidiary SK Specialty to Hahn & Company, a domestic private equity fund (PEF). The value of the stake in the sale is worth about W2.7 trillion.

== Subsidiaries ==
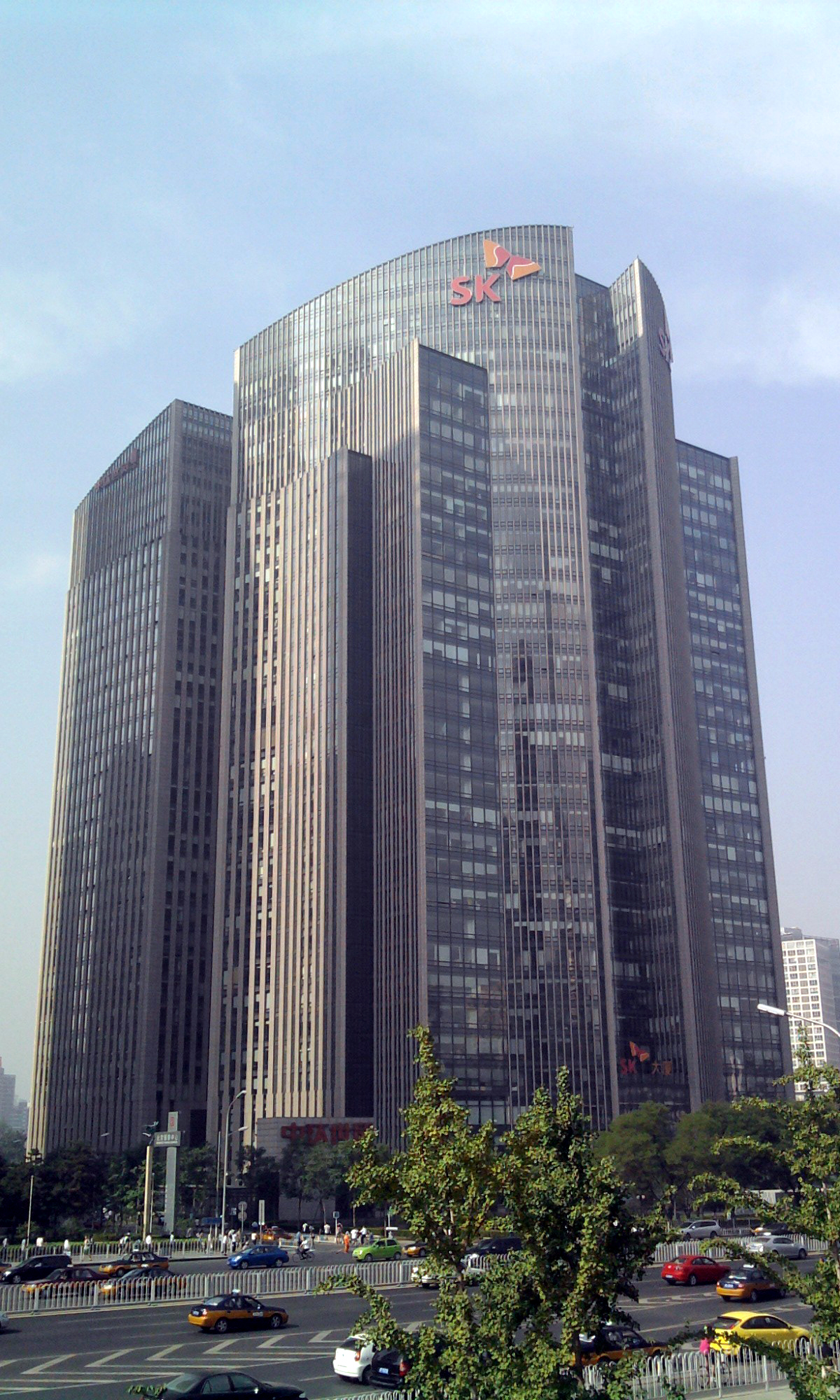
SK Building in Beijing CBD

=== Holdings ===
- SK Inc. (KRX: 003600) is a holding company which resulted when SK Corporation was reorganized on July 1, 2007, into a holding company and an operating company, SK Inc. and SK Energy, respectively. SK Inc. is a part of the SK Group that focuses on 4 core business interests, High-tech materials, Bio, Green and Digital. The SK Group is composed of 186 affiliate companies that share the SK brand and culture. In 2021, SK Group recorded combined revenues of $133 billion, with exports contributing $50 billion of that total. SK continues to expand its global presence, with more than 117,590 employees who work from 473 offices worldwide.
- SK Square (KRX: 402340) is an investment-focused holding company that manages an investment portfolio. It is the parent company of SK hynix and holds an approximately 20.1% equity stake in the company. SK Square is a key entity within the SK Group for group-level control and capital allocation, and operates as a buy-side investment platform with characteristics comparable to private equity and venture capital. The company conducts cross-border investments through TGC (Technology Growth Collaboration) Square, a Singapore-based overseas investment entity wholly owned by SK Square. TGC Square focuses on identifying and investing early in promising AI and semiconductor-related companies in the United States and Japan. In Japan, investment activities have been described as being led by the SK Japan organization based in Tokyo Midtown, with portfolio companies generally targeting IPOs over the following years, and with some reportedly progressing to subsequent funding rounds.

=== Energy and chemicals ===
- SK Innovation (KRX: 096770) is a South Korean enterprise formed as part of the July 1, 2007, reorganization of SK Corporation into a holding company and operating company, SK Inc. and SK Energy, respectively. In 2011, the petroleum business was spun off to become SK Energy. Simultaneously the chemical business was spun off to become SK Innovation. SK Energy was founded in 1962 as Korea's first oil refinery. In 1982, changed company name to Yukong. SK Energy is an energy and petrochemical company with 5,000 employees, KRW 23.65 trillion in sales and 26 offices spanning the globe. The company is Korea's largest (and Asia's fourth largest) refiner with a refining capacity of 1.15 million barrels per day, as of 2006. SK Energy is engaged in exploration and development activities in 26 oil / gas blocks in 14 nations worldwide.
- SKC (KRX: 011790), headquartered in Seoul, is the leading Korean company in chemical and film industry. SKC was founded and established in 1976 as previous name of Sunkyong Chemicals Ltd (선경화학(주)). SKC became the first Korean company that developed polyester films through its own efforts. With its main plant and R&D center located in Suwon, South Korea, it also operates a large-capacity film plant in Covington, Georgia, United States. SKC is engaged in chemicals, films, and solar. Including all subsidiaries, the company reported revenue of KRW2.7 trillion and operating profit of KRW190 billion in 2021. Its debt-to-equity ratio was 138% as of 3Q15. As one of the few conglomerates in Korea that focuses on chemical/material/component manufacturing and R&D, it has a long history among SK Group companies. In the past, the company produced videos, floppy disks, CDs, etc., but is now mainly engaged in B2B business such as chemical solutions, industrial films, and new materials. It is often confused with SK Chemicals, but they are not the same company.
- SK Innovation E&S: A comprehensive energy company. Its businesses include city gas, LNG, and renewable energy. It holds 22 per cent of the domestic city gas market. Recently, it has entered the hydrogen energy business.

=== Information and communications technology ===
- SK Telecom (KRX: 017670) is Korea's No. 1 mobile phone company and the parent company of the SK Group ICT Family, a group of telecoms and semiconductor companies. As of the third quarter of 2024, SK Telecom recorded sales of KRW 4.532 trillion, operating profit of KRW 533.3 billion, and net profit of KRW 280.2 billion. Its debt-to-equity ratio is just 134 per cent.
- SK Broadband: SK Broadband is responsible for wired and wireless internet communications, IPTV, telephony, IDC, and network solution products.
- SK Inc. C&C was established in 1991 and is currently one of the "Big Three" IT services companies in Korea. SK C&C has business interests across IT services, including telecommunications, banking & finance, government, public, logistics, and other fields.
- SK Communications: The company that operates Nate.

=== Semiconductor and materials ===
- SK Hynix (KRX: 000660), along with Samsung Electronics and Micron Technology, is one of the "Big Three" semiconductor manufacturers dominating the global computer memory market (DRAM and NAND flash), as they control around 95% of the international market share. As of the start of November 2026, the company ranks as the world's 21st-largest company by market capitalization and the world's 7th-largest semiconductor company, with a market capitalization of approximately $754.56 billion. SK Hynix was founded in 1983 as "Hyundai Electronics", which is the origin of its name "Hynix", and merged into SK Group in 2012 when SK Telecom became the major shareholder. Its major products include DRAM, flash memory, and many other semiconductor materials. Although its headquarters is located in Icheon, Gyeonggi Province, it also operates a large production line in Cheongju, North Chungcheong Province.
- SK Siltron is South Korea's only semiconductor wafer manufacturer, and it has grown hand in hand with the international semiconductor industry for over 35 years. Leveraging its long history of mass production and accumulated know-how, the company is preemptively expanding production capacity, while continuing to strengthen its manufacturing and technological competitiveness. At the same time, the company is expanding its business portfolio to include emerging areas such as SiC wafers. This lays a strong foundation for SK Siltron's increasing growth, enabling it to become one of the world’s largest semiconductor materials players in both production volume and profitability.

=== Logistics, services and bio ===
- SK Biopharmaceuticals (KRX: 326030) is a drug discovery and drug development company. It discovered solriamfetol.
- SK Ecoplant is a Korean construction company founded and established in 1977 with a previous name of Sunkyong Construction (Korean: 선경 건설), headquartered in Gwanhun-dong Jongno-gu, Seoul. Its brands include SK View, SK Hub, SK Tes and Apelbaum. The company's CEO is Ki Haeng Cho. Industries: Oil & Gas, Petrochemical, Power, Environmental Protection, Industrial, Civil, Building, Housing. Services:Feasibility Study, EPC Service, Project Management, Operations & Maintenance.
- SK Networks: A conglomerate that operates a variety of businesses, including trading, information and communication, energy distribution, consumer goods, and car rental.
- SK Oceanplant: It is a subsidiary of SK Innovation, which produces offshore wind farms and ship parts.
- SK Pharmteco is a global contract development and manufacturing organization specializing in the production of active pharmaceutical ingredients (APIs), intermediates, and viral vectors for cell and gene therapy for the pharmaceutical industry. SK Pharmteco operates six facilities in Europe, North America, and Korea.

== Management system ==
SK's subsidiary companies all operate under the SK Management System (SKMS), which was developed, articulated, and enhanced by SK's Chairman, Chey Tae-won.

On April 7, 2008, SK Group launched a marketing and management company named "SK Marketing & Company".

== Dissolution/Sale ==
- Kyungsung Rubber Industries: Merged into SK Warehouse in 1998.
- Kyungjin Shipping: Liquidated in 1998 after transferring assets to a new company, Phil Ocean Shipping (now Inter Ocean Shipping).
- SK Life (now Mirae Asset Life): Acquired by Mirae Asset Group in 2005.
- SK Wyverns (now SSG Landers): Sold to Shinsegae in 2021.

== See also ==
- Chaebol
- Economy of South Korea
- Electric vehicle charging industry of South Korea
- H.A.V.E. Online
- Fallen Age
