= List of commercial nuclear reactors =

This is a list of all the commercial nuclear reactors in the world, sorted by country, with operational status. The list only includes civilian nuclear power reactors used to generate electricity for a power grid. All commercial nuclear reactors use nuclear fission. As of May 2025, there are 439 operable power reactors in the world, with a combined electrical capacity of 397.7 GW. Additionally, there are 68 reactors under construction and 108 reactors planned, with a combined capacity of 74 GW and 103 GW, respectively, while 359 more reactors are proposed. For non-power reactors, see List of nuclear research reactors. For fuel plants see List of nuclear reprocessing plants. Where not otherwise specified, all information is sourced from the Power Reactor Information System (PRIS) of the International Atomic Energy Agency (IAEA).

In the following tables, the capacity (expressed in megawatt, MW) refers to the net capacity, or the maximum electricity output under reference ambient conditions, after deducting the losses within the system including the energy transformers.

== Argentina ==
Plant name	Unit No.	Type	Model	Status	Capacity (MW)	Begin building	Commercial operation	Closed
Atucha	1	PHWR	Siemens-KWU	Operation suspended (under maintenance)	362	1 Jun 1968	24 Jun 1974	
Atucha	2	PHWR	Siemens-KWU	Operational	745	14 Jul 1981	27 Jun 2014	
Atucha	3	PWR	Hualong One	Planned	1200			
Embalse	1	PHWR	CANDU-6	Operational	683	1 Apr 1974	20 Jan 1984	(2049)
CAREM	1	PWR	CAREM25	Under construction	25	8 Feb 2014		

== Armenia ==
Plant name	Unit No.	Type	Model	Status	Capacity (MW)	Begin building	Commercial operation	Closed
Metsamor	1	PWR	VVER-440/V-270	Shut down	376	1 Jul 1969	6 Oct 1977	25 Feb 1989
Metsamor	2	PWR	VVER-440/V-270	Operational	375	1 Jul 1975	3 May 1980	(2036)

== Austria ==
Plant name	Unit No.	Type	Model	Status	Capacity (MW)	Begin building	Commercial operation	Closed
Zwentendorf	1	BWR	BWR-69 (KWU)	Finished; never entered service	878	Apr 1972	–	5 Nov 1978

== Bangladesh ==
Plant name	Unit No.	Type	Model	Status	Capacity (MW)	Begin building	Commercial operation	Closed
Rooppur	1	PWR	VVER-1200/V-523	In commissioning	1080	30 Nov 2017	(2026)	
Rooppur	2	PWR	VVER-1200/V-523	Under construction	1080	14 Jul 2018	(2027)	

== Belarus ==
Plant name	Unit No.	Type	Model	Status	Capacity (MW)	Begin building	Commercial operation	Closed
Astravets	1	PWR	VVER-1200/V-491	Operational	1109	6 Nov 2013	10 Jun 2021	
Astravets	2	PWR	VVER-1200/V-491	Operational	1109	24 Apr 2014	1 Nov 2023	
Minsk	1	PWR	VVER-1000	Unfinished	963	1983		1987
Minsk	2	PWR	VVER-1000	Unfinished	963	1983		1987

== Belgium ==
Plant name	Unit No.	Type	Model	Status	Capacity (MW)	Begin building	Commercial operation	Closed
SCK•CEN	1	PWR	Westinghouse (WH) BR-3	Decommissioned	10	1 Nov 1957	10 Oct 1962	30 Jun 1987
Doel	1	PWR	WH 2 loops	Shut down	445	1 Jul 1969	15 Feb 1975	14 Feb 2025
Doel	2	PWR	WH 2 loops	Shut down	445	1 Sep 1971	1 Dec 1975	30 Nov 2025
Doel	3	PWR	Framatome 3 loops	Shut down	1006	1 Jan 1975	1 Oct 1982	23 Sep 2022
Doel	4	PWR	Belgian firms plus WH 3 loops	Operational	1039	1 Dec 1978	1 Jul 1985	(1 Nov 2035)
Tihange	1	PWR	Framatome 3 loops	Shut down	962	1 Jun 1970	1 Oct 1975	1 Oct 2025
Tihange	2	PWR	Framatome 3 loops	Shut down	1008	1 Apr 1976	1 Jun 1983	31 Jan 2023
Tihange	3	PWR	Belgian firms plus WH 3 loops	Operational	1046	1 Nov 1978	1 Sep 1985	(1 Nov 2035)

== Brazil ==
Plant name	Unit No.	Type	Model	Status	Capacity (MW)	Begin building	Commercial operation	Closed
Angra	1	PWR	WH 2 loops	Operational	609	1 May 1971	1 Jan 1985	
Angra	2	PWR	Pre-Konvoi	Operational	1275	1 Jan 1976	1 Feb 2001	
Angra	3	PWR	Pre-Konvoi	Under construction	1245	1 Jun 2010	(2028)	

== Bulgaria ==
Plant name	Unit No.	Type	Model	Status	Capacity (MW)	Begin building	Commercial operation	Closed
Kozloduy	1	PWR	VVER-440/V-230	Shut down	408	1 Apr 1970	28 Oct 1974	31 Dec 2002
Kozloduy	2	PWR	VVER-440/V-230	Shut down	408	1 Apr 1970	10 Nov 1975	31 Dec 2002
Kozloduy	3	PWR	VVER-440/V-230	Shut down	408	1 Oct 1973	20 Jan 1981	31 Dec 2006
Kozloduy	4	PWR	VVER-440/V-230	Shut down	408	1 Oct 1973	20 Jun 1982	31 Dec 2006
Kozloduy	5	PWR	VVER-1000/V-320	Operational	1003	9 Jul 1980	23 Dec 1988	
Kozloduy	6	PWR	VVER-1000/V-320	Operational	1003	1 Apr 1982	30 Dec 1993	
Kozloduy	7	PWR	AP1000	Planned	1150		(2033)	
Kozloduy	8	PWR	AP1000	Planned	1150			
Belene	1	PWR	VVER-1000/V-320; VVER-1000/V-446B	Unfinished	953; 1011	1987; 2008		
Belene	2	PWR	VVER-1000/V-320; VVER-1000/V-446B	Unfinished	953; 1011	1987; 2008		

== Canada ==
Plant name	Unit No.	Type	Model	Status	Capacity (MW)	Begin building	Commercial operation	Closed
Pickering	1	PHWR	CANDU 500A	Shut down	515	Jun 1966	29 Jul 1971	1 Oct 2024
Pickering	2	PHWR	CANDU 500A	Shut down	515	Sep 1966	30 Dec 1971	31 Dec 1997
Pickering	3	PHWR	CANDU 500A	Shut down	515	Dec 1967	1 Jun 1972	29 Dec 1997
Pickering	4	PHWR	CANDU 500A	Shut down	515	May 1968	17 Jun 1973	31 Dec 2024
Pickering	5	PHWR	CANDU 500B	Operation suspended (under refurbishment)	516	Nov 1974	10 May 1983	(2064)
Pickering	6	PHWR	CANDU 500B	Operation suspended (under refurbishment)	516	Oct 1975	1 Feb 1984	(2064)
Pickering	7	PHWR	CANDU 500B	Operation suspended (under refurbishment)	516	Mar 1976	1 Jan 1985	(2064)
Pickering	8	PHWR	CANDU 500B	Operation suspended (under refurbishment)	516	Sep 1976	28 Feb 1986	(2064)
Darlington	1	PHWR	CANDU 850	Operational	878	Apr 1982	14 Nov 1992	(2052)
Darlington	2	PHWR	CANDU 850	Operational	878	Sep 1981	9 Oct 1990	(2050)
Darlington	3	PHWR	CANDU 850	Operational	878	Sep 1984	14 Feb 1993	(2053)
Darlington	4	PHWR	CANDU 850	Operational	878	Jul 1985	14 Jun 1993	(2053)
Darlington	5	BWR	BWRX-300	Under construction	300	8 May 2025	(2030)	
Darlington	6	BWR	BWRX-300	Planned	300			
Darlington	7	BWR	BWRX-300	Planned	300			
Darlington	8	BWR	BWRX-300	Planned	300			
Bruce	1	PHWR	CANDU 791	Operational	823	Jun 1971	1 Sep 1977	(2043)
Bruce	2	PHWR	CANDU 791	Operational	823	Dec 1970	1 Sep 1977	(2043)
Bruce	3	PHWR	CANDU 750A	Operational	817	Jul 1972	1 Feb 1978	(2064)
Bruce	4	PHWR	CANDU 750A	Operational	817	Sep 1972	18 Jan 1979	(2064)
Bruce	5	PHWR	CANDU 750B	Operational	817	Jun 1978	1 Mar 1985	(2064)
Bruce	6	PHWR	CANDU 750B	Operational	880	Jan 1978	15 Sep 1984	(2064)
Bruce	7	PHWR	CANDU 750B	Operational	817	May 1979	10 Apr 1986	(2064)
Bruce	8	PHWR	CANDU 750B	Operational	817	Aug 1979	22 May 1987	(2064)
NPD	1	PHWR	CANDU	Shut down	19	Jan 1958	4 Jun 1962	1 Aug 1987
Douglas Point	1	PHWR	CANDU 200	Shut down	200	Feb 1960	26 Sep 1968	4 May 1984
Gentilly	1	BWR	CANDU BLWR 250	Shut down	250	Sep 1966	1 May 1972	1 June 1977
Gentilly	2	PHWR	CANDU-6	Shut down	635	Apr 1974	1 Oct 1983	28 Dec 2012
Point Lepreau	1	PHWR	CANDU-6	Operational	635	May 1975	1 Feb 1983	(2041)

== China ==
Plant name	Unit No.	Type	Model	Status	Capacity (MW)	Begin building	Commercial operation	Closed
Bailong	1	PWR	CAP-1000	Under construction	1100	22 Dec 2025		
Bailong	2	PWR	CAP-1000	Under construction	1100	9 Aug 2026		
Bailong	3	PWR	CAP-1400	Planned	1450			
Bailong	4	PWR	CAP-1400	Planned	1450			
Bailong	5	PWR	CAP-1400	Planned	1450			
Bailong	6	PWR	CAP-1400	Planned	1450			
Changjiang	1	PWR	CNP-600	Operational	601	25 Apr 2010	25 Dec 2015	
Changjiang	2	PWR	CNP-600	Operational	601	21 Nov 2010	20 Jun 2016	
Changjiang	3	PWR	Hualong One	Operational	1100	31 Mar 2021	17 Sep 2026	
Changjiang	4	PWR	Hualong One	Under construction	1100	31 Mar 2021	(2026)	
Changjiang	II-1	PWR	ACP-100	Under construction	100	13 Jul 2021	(2026)	
Daya Bay	1	PWR	M-310	Operational	944	7 Aug 1987	1 Feb 1994	
Daya Bay	2	PWR	M-310	Operational	944	7 Apr 1988	6 May 1994	
Fangchenggang	1	PWR	CPR-1000	Operational	1000	30 Jul 2010	25 Oct 2015	
Fangchenggang	2	PWR	CPR-1000	Operational	1000	23 Dec 2010	15 Jul 2016	
Fangchenggang	3	PWR	Hualong One	Operational	1000	24 Dec 2015	25 Mar 2023	
Fangchenggang	4	PWR	Hualong One	Operational	1000	24 Dec 2016	25 May 2024	
Fangchenggang	5	PWR	Hualong One	Planned	1117			
Fangchenggang	6	PWR	Hualong One	Planned	1117			
Fangjiashan	1	PWR	CPR-1000	Operational	1012	26 Dec 2008	15 Dec 2014	
Fangjiashan	2	PWR	CPR-1000	Operational	1012	17 Jul 2009	12 Feb 2015	
Fuqing	1	PWR	CPR-1000	Operational	1000	21 Nov 2008	19 Nov 2014	
Fuqing	2	PWR	CPR-1000	Operational	1000	17 Jun 2009	15 Oct 2015	
Fuqing	3	PWR	CPR-1000	Operational	1000	31 Dec 2010	7 Sep 2016	
Fuqing	4	PWR	CPR-1000	Operational	1000	17 Nov 2012	31 Jul 2017	
Fuqing	5	PWR	Hualong One	Operational	1000	15 Apr 2015	30 Jan 2021	
Fuqing	6	PWR	Hualong One	Operational	1000	22 Dec 2015	25 Mar 2022	
Haiyang	1	PWR	AP1000	Operational	1170	24 Sep 2009	23 Oct 2018	
Haiyang	2	PWR	AP1000	Operational	1170	20 Jun 2010	9 Jan 2019	
Haiyang	3	PWR	CAP-1000	Under construction	1100	7 Jul 2022		
Haiyang	4	PWR	CAP-1000	Under construction	1100	22 Apr 2023		
Haiyang	5	PWR	CAP-1000	Under construction	1100	31 Oct 2026		
Haiyang	6	PWR	CAP-1000	Planned	1100			
Haixing	1	PWR	CAP-1000	Planned	1100			
Haixing	2	PWR	CAP-1000	Planned	1100			
Hongyanhe	1	PWR	CPR-1000	Operational	1061	18 Aug 2007	6 Jun 2013	
Hongyanhe	2	PWR	CPR-1000	Operational	1061	28 Mar 2008	13 May 2014	
Hongyanhe	3	PWR	CPR-1000	Operational	1061	7 Mar 2009	23 Mar 2015	
Hongyanhe	4	PWR	CPR-1000	Operational	1061	15 Aug 2009	1 Apr 2016	
Hongyanhe	5	PWR	ACPR-1000	Operational	1061	29 Mar 2015	2 Aug 2021	
Hongyanhe	6	PWR	ACPR-1000	Operational	1061	24 Jul 2015	23 Jun 2022	
Jinqimen	1	PWR	Hualong One	Under construction	1126	10 Aug 2025		
Jinqimen	2	PWR	Hualong One	Under construction	1126	7 Apr 2026		
Jinqimen	3	PWR	Hualong One 2.0	Under construction	1126	2026		
Jinqimen	4	PWR	Hualong One 2.0	Under construction	1126	2027		
Jinqimen	5	PWR	Hualong One 2.0	Planned	1126			
Jinqimen	6	PWR	Hualong One 2.0	Planned	1126			
Laiyang	1	PWR	Guohe One/CAP1400	Under construction	1450	2026		
Laiyang	2	PWR	Guohe One/CAP1400	Under construction	1450	2027		
Laiyang	3	PWR	Guohe One	Planned	1450			
Laiyang	4	PWR	Guohe One	Planned	1450			
Laiyang	5	PWR	Guohe One	Planned	1450			
Laiyang	6	PWR	Guohe One	Planned	1450			
Lianjiang	1	PWR	CAP-1000	Under construction	1100	27 Sep 2023		
Lianjiang	2	PWR	CAP-1000	Under construction	1100	26 April 2024		
Lianjiang	3	PWR	CAP-1400	Planned	1450			
Lianjiang	4	PWR	CAP-1400	Planned	1450			
Lianjiang	5	PWR	CAP-1400	Planned	1450			
Lianjiang	6	PWR	CAP-1400	Planned	1450			
Ling Ao	1	PWR	M-310	Operational	950	15 May 1997	28 May 2002	
Ling Ao	2	PWR	M-310	Operational	950	28 Nov 1997	8 Jan 2003	
Ling Ao	3	PWR	CPR-1000	Operational	1007	15 Dec 2005	15 Sep 2010	
Ling Ao	4	PWR	CPR-1000	Operational	1007	15 Jun 2006	7 Aug 2011	
Lufeng	1	PWR	CAP-1000	Under construction	1100	24 Feb 2025		
Lufeng	2	PWR	CAP-1000	Under construction	1100	28 Mar 2025		
Lufeng	3	PWR	Hualong One	Planned	1100			
Lufeng	4	PWR	Hualong One	Planned	1100			
Lufeng	5	PWR	Hualong One	Under construction	1000	8 Sep 2022		
Lufeng	6	PWR	Hualong One	Under construction	1000	26 Aug 2023		
Ningde	1	PWR	CPR-1000	Operational	1018	18 Feb 2008	15 Apr 2013	
Ningde	2	PWR	CPR-1000	Operational	1018	12 Nov 2008	4 May 2014	
Ningde	3	PWR	CPR-1000	Operational	1018	8 Jan 2010	10 Jun 2015	
Ningde	4	PWR	CPR-1000	Operational	1018	29 Sep 2010	29 Mar 2016	
Ningde	5	PWR	Hualong One	Under construction	1080	28 Jul 2024		
Ningde	6	PWR	Hualong One	Under construction	1080	15 Dec 2025		
Pengze	1	PWR	CAP-1000	Planned	1100			
Pengze	2	PWR	CAP-1000	Planned	1100			
Qinshan	I-1	PWR	CNP-300	Operational	308	20 Mar 1985	1 Apr 1994	
Qinshan	II-1	PWR	CNP-600	Operational	610	2 Jun 1996	15 Apr 2002	
Qinshan	II-2	PWR	CNP-600	Operational	610	1 Apr 1997	3 May 2004	
Qinshan	II-3	PWR	CNP-600	Operational	619	28 Apr 2006	5 Oct 2010	
Qinshan	II-4	PWR	CNP-600	Operational	619	28 Jan 2007	30 Dec 2011	
Qinshan	III-1	PHWR	CANDU-6	Operational	677	8 Jun 1998	31 Dec 2002	
Qinshan	III-2	PHWR	CANDU-6	Operational	677	25 Sep 1998	24 Jul 2003	
San'ao	1	PWR	Hualong One	Operational	1117	31 Dec 2020	14 Mar 2026	
San'ao	2	PWR	Hualong One	Under construction	1117	30 Dec 2021	(2027)	
San'ao	3	PWR	Hualong One	Under construction	1116	18 Nov 2025		
San'ao	4	PWR	Hualong One	Under construction	1116	10 Nov 2026		
San'ao	5	PWR	Hualong One	Planned	1116			
San'ao	6	PWR	Hualong One	Planned	1116			
Sanmen	1	PWR	AP1000	Operational	1157	19 Apr 2009	21 Sep 2018	
Sanmen	2	PWR	AP1000	Operational	1157	15 Dec 2009	5 Nov 2018	
Sanmen	3	PWR	CAP-1000	Under construction	1163	28 Jun 2022		
Sanmen	4	PWR	CAP-1000	Under construction	1163	22 Mar 2023		
Sanmen	5	PWR	Hualong One	Planned	1000			
Sanmen	6	PWR	Hualong One	Planned	1000			
Shidaowan	I-1	HTGR	HTR-PM	Operational	200	9 Dec 2012	6 Dec 2023	
Shidaowan	II-1	PWR	CAP-1400	Operational	1450	19 Jun 2019	10 Nov 2024	
Shidaowan	II-2	PWR	CAP-1400	Operational	1450	4 Apr 2020	19 July 2025	
Shidaowan	III-1	PWR	Hualong One	Under construction	1134	28 Jul 2024		
Shidaowan	III-2	PWR	Hualong One	Under construction	1134	5 May 2025		
Shidaowan	III-3	PWR	Hualong One	Planned	1116			
Shidaowan	III-4	PWR	Hualong One	Planned	1116			
Taipingling	1	PWR	Hualong One	Operational	1116	26 Dec 2019	19 Apr 2026	
Taipingling	2	PWR	Hualong One	Operational	1116	15 Oct 2020	3 Aug 2026	
Taipingling	3	PWR	Hualong One	Under construction	1116	10 Jun 2025	2030	
Taipingling	4	PWR	Hualong One	Under construction	1116	10 May 2026	2031	
Taipingling	5	PWR	Hualong One 2.0	Planned	1116			
Taipingling	6	PWR	Hualong One 2.0	Planned	1116			
Taishan	1	PWR	EPR	Operational	1660	18 Nov 2009	14 Dec 2018	
Taishan	2	PWR	EPR	Operational	1660	15 Apr 2010	7 Sep 2019	
Taishan	3	PWR	Hualong One	Planned	1000			
Taishan	4	PWR	Hualong One	Planned	1000			
Taishan	5	PWR	Hualong One	Planned	1000			
Taishan	6	PWR	Hualong One	Planned	1000			
Taishan	7	PWR	Hualong One	Planned	1000			
Taishan	8	PWR	Hualong One	Planned	1000			
Taishan	9	PWR	Hualong One	Planned	1000			
Taishan	10	PWR	Hualong One	Planned	1000			
Taohuajiang	1	PWR	CAP-1000	Planned	1100			
Taohuajiang	2	PWR	CAP-1000	Planned	1100			
Taohuajiang	3	PWR	CAP-1000	Planned	1100			
Taohuajiang	4	PWR	CAP-1000	Planned	1100			
Tianwan	1	PWR	VVER-1000/V-428	Operational	990	20 Oct 1999	17 May 2007	
Tianwan	2	PWR	VVER-1000/V-428	Operational	990	20 Sep 2000	16 Aug 2007	
Tianwan	3	PWR	VVER-1000/V-428M	Operational	1045	27 Dec 2012	14 Feb 2018	
Tianwan	4	PWR	VVER-1000/V-428M	Operational	1045	27 Sep 2013	22 Dec 2018	
Tianwan	5	PWR	ACPR-1000	Operational	1080	27 Dec 2015	8 Sep 2020	
Tianwan	6	PWR	ACPR-1000	Operational	1080	7 Sep 2016	3 Jun 2021	
Tianwan	7	PWR	VVER-1200/V-491	Under construction	1150	19 May 2021	(2027–2028)	
Tianwan	8	PWR	VVER-1200/V-491	Under construction	1150	25 Feb 2022	(2027–2028)	
Xianning	1	PWR	CAP-1000	Planned	1100			
Xianning	2	PWR	CAP-1000	Planned	1100			
Xiapu	I-1	SFR	CFR-600	Under construction	642	29 Dec 2017	(2028)	
Xiapu	I-2	SFR	CFR-600	Under construction	642	27 Dec 2020		
Xiapu	II-1	PWR	Hualong One	Planned	1000			
Xiapu	II-2	PWR	Hualong One	Planned	1000			
Xiapu	II-3	PWR	Hualong One	Planned	1000			
Xiapu	II-4	PWR	Hualong One	Planned	1000			
Xudabao	1	PWR	CAP-1000	Under construction	1250	15 Nov 2023		
Xudabao	2	PWR	CAP-1000	Under construction	1100	17 Jul 2024		
Xudabao	3	PWR	VVER-1200/V-491	Under construction	1150	28 Jul 2021	(2027)	
Xudabao	4	PWR	VVER-1200/V-491	Under construction	1150	19 May 2022	(2028)	
Xudabao	5	PWR	VVER-1200/V-491	Planned	1150			
Xudabao	6	PWR	VVER-1200/V-491	Planned	1150			
Xuwei	1	PWR	Hualong One	Under construction	1116	16 Jan 2026		
Xuwei	2	PWR	Hualong One	Planned	1116			
Xuwei	3	HTGR	HTR-PM	Under construction	660	6 Nov 2026		
Yangjiang	1	PWR	CPR-1000	Operational	1000	16 Dec 2008	25 Mar 2014	
Yangjiang	2	PWR	CPR-1000	Operational	1000	4 Jun 2009	8 Jun 2015	
Yangjiang	3	PWR	CPR-1000	Operational	1000	15 Nov 2010	1 Jan 2016	
Yangjiang	4	PWR	CPR-1000	Operational	1000	17 Nov 2012	15 Mar 2017	
Yangjiang	5	PWR	ACPR-1000	Operational	1000	18 Sep 2013	12 Jul 2018	
Yangjiang	6	PWR	ACPR-1000	Operational	1000	23 Dec 2013	24 Jul 2019	
Zhangzhou	1	PWR	Hualong One	Operational	1126	16 Oct 2019	1 Jan 2025	
Zhangzhou	2	PWR	Hualong One	Operational	1126	4 Sep 2020	22 Nov 2025	
Zhangzhou	3	PWR	Hualong One	Under construction	1126	22 Feb 2024		
Zhangzhou	4	PWR	Hualong One	Under construction	1126	27 Sep 2024		
Zhangzhou	5	PWR	Hualong One	Planned	1116			
Zhangzhou	6	PWR	Hualong One	Planned	1116			
Zhaoyuan	1	PWR	Hualong One	Under construction	1116	18 Nov 2025		
Zhaoyuan	2	PWR	Hualong One	Under construction	1116	5 Sep 2026		
Zhaoyuan	3	PWR	Hualong One	Planned	1116			
Zhaoyuan	4	PWR	Hualong One	Planned	1116			
Zhaoyuan	5	PWR	Hualong One	Planned	1116			
Zhaoyuan	6	PWR	Hualong One	Planned	1116			
Zhuanghe	1	PWR	Hualong One	Planned	1116			
Zhuanghe	2	PWR	Hualong One	Planned	1116			

== Cuba ==
Plant name	Unit No.	Type	Model	Status	Capacity (MW)	Begin building	Commercial operation	Closed
Juragua	1	PWR	VVER-440/V-318	Unfinished	440	1983		5 Sep 1992
Juragua	2	PWR	VVER-440/V-318	Unfinished	440	1985		5 Sep 1992

== Czech Republic ==
Plant name	Unit No.	Type	Model	Status	Capacity (MW)	Begin building	Commercial operation	Closed
Dukovany	1	PWR	VVER-440/V-213	Operational	468	1 Jan 1979	3 May 1985	
Dukovany	2	PWR	VVER-440/V-213	Operational	471	1 Jan 1979	21 Mar 1986	
Dukovany	3	PWR	VVER-440/V-213	Operational	468	1 Mar 1979	20 Dec 1986	
Dukovany	4	PWR	VVER-440/V-213	Operational	471	1 Mar 1979	19 Jul 1987	
Dukovany	5	PWR	APR-1000	Planned	1055			
Dukovany	6	PWR	APR-1000	Planned	1055			
Temelín	1	PWR	VVER-1000/V-320	Operational	1003	1 Feb 1987	10 Jun 2002	
Temelín	2	PWR	VVER-1000/V-320	Operational	1003	1 Feb 1987	18 Apr 2003	

== Egypt ==
Plant name	Unit No.	Type	Model	Status	Capacity (MW)	Begin building	Commercial operation	Closed
El Dabaa	1	PWR	VVER-1200/V-529	Under construction	1200	20 Jul 2022	(2028)	
El Dabaa	2	PWR	VVER-1200/V-529	Under construction	1200	19 Nov 2022		
El Dabaa	3	PWR	VVER-1200/V-529	Under construction	1200	3 May 2023		
El Dabaa	4	PWR	VVER-1200/V-529	Under construction	1200	23 Jan 2024		

== Finland ==
Plant name	Unit No.	Type	Model	Status	Capacity (MW)	Begin building	Commercial operation	Closed
Hanhikivi	1	PWR	VVER-1200/V-491	Cancelled	1200	(2023)	(2029)	2 May 2022
Loviisa	1	PWR	VVER-440/V-213	Operational	507	1 May 1971	9 May 1977	
Loviisa	2	PWR	VVER-440/V-213	Operational	507	1 Aug 1972	5 Jan 1981	
Olkiluoto	1	BWR	ASEA-III, BWR-2500	Operational	890	1 Feb 1974	10 Oct 1979	
Olkiluoto	2	BWR	ASEA-III, BWR-2500	Operational	890	1 Nov 1975	10 Jul 1982	
Olkiluoto	3	PWR	EPR	Operational	1600	12 Aug 2005	1 May 2023	

== France ==
Plant name	Unit No.	Type	Model	Status	Capacity (MW)	Begin building	Commercial operation	Closed
Belleville	1	PWR	P4 REP 1300	Operational	1310	1 May 1980	1 Jun 1988	
Belleville	2	PWR	P4 REP 1300	Operational	1310	1 Aug 1980	1 Jan 1989	
Blayais	1	PWR	CP1	Operational	910	1 Jan 1977	1 Dec 1981	
Blayais	2	PWR	CP1	Operational	910	1 Jan 1977	1 Feb 1983	
Blayais	3	PWR	CP1	Operational	910	1 Apr 1978	14 Nov 1983	
Blayais	4	PWR	CP1	Operational	910	1 Apr 1978	1 Oct 1983	
Brennilis	1	HWGCR		Shut down/in decommissioning	70	1 Jul 1962	1 Jun 1968	31 Jul 1985
Bugey	1	GCR	UNGG	Shut down	540	1 Dec 1965	1 Jul 1972	27 May 1994
Bugey	2	PWR	CP0	Operational	910	1 Nov 1972	1 Mar 1979	
Bugey	3	PWR	CP0	Operational	910	1 Sep 1973	1 Mar 1979	
Bugey	4	PWR	CP0	Operational	880	1 Jun 1974	1 Jul 1979	
Bugey	5	PWR	CP0	Operational	880	1 Jul 1974	3 Jan 1980	
Bugey	6	PWR	EPR2	Planned	1670			
Bugey	7	PWR	EPR2	Planned	1670			
Cattenom	1	PWR	P4 REP 1300	Operational	1300	29 Oct 1979	1 Apr 1987	
Cattenom	2	PWR	P4 REP 1300	Operational	1300	28 Jul 1980	1 Feb 1988	
Cattenom	3	PWR	P4 REP 1300	Operational	1300	15 Jun 1982	1 Feb 1991	
Cattenom	4	PWR	P4 REP 1300	Operational	1300	28 Sep 1983	1 Jan 1992	
Chinon	A-1	GCR	UNGG	Shut down	70	1 Feb 1957	1 Feb 1964	16 Apr 1973
Chinon	A-2	GCR	UNGG	Shut down	180	1 Aug 1959	24 Feb 1965	14 Jun 1985
Chinon	A-3	GCR	UNGG	Shut down	360	1 Mar 1961	4 Aug 1966	15 Jun 1990
Chinon	B-1	PWR	CP2	Operational	905	1 Mar 1977	1 Feb 1984	
Chinon	B-2	PWR	CP2	Operational	905	1 Mar 1977	1 Aug 1984	
Chinon	B-3	PWR	CP2	Operational	905	1 Oct 1980	4 Mar 1987	
Chinon	B-4	PWR	CP2	Operational	905	1 Feb 1981	1 Apr 1988	
Chooz	A-1	PWR	CHOOZ-A	Decommissioned	305	1 Jan 1962	15 Apr 1967	30 Oct 1991
Chooz	B-1	PWR	N4 REP 1450	Operational	1500	1 Jan 1984	15 May 2000	
Chooz	B-2	PWR	N4 REP 1450	Operational	1500	1 Jan 1984	15 May 2000	
Civaux	1	PWR	N4 REP 1450	Operational	1495	15 Oct 1988	29 Jan 2002	
Civaux	2	PWR	N4 REP 1450	Operational	1495	1 Apr 1991	23 Apr 2002	
Cruas	1	PWR	CP2	Operational	915	1 Aug 1978	2 Apr 1984	
Cruas	2	PWR	CP2	Operational	915	15 Nov 1978	1 Apr 1985	
Cruas	3	PWR	CP2	Operational	915	15 Apr 1979	10 Sep 1984	
Cruas	4	PWR	CP2	Operational	915	1 Oct 1979	11 Feb 1985	
Dampierre	1	PWR	CP1	Operational	890	1 Feb 1975	10 Sep 1980	
Dampierre	2	PWR	CP1	Operational	890	1 Apr 1975	16 Feb 1981	
Dampierre	3	PWR	CP1	Operational	890	1 Sep 1975	27 May 1981	
Dampierre	4	PWR	CP1	Operational	890	1 Dec 1975	20 Nov 1981	
Fessenheim	1	PWR	CP0	Shut down	880	1 Sep 1971	1 Jan 1978	22 Feb 2020
Fessenheim	2	PWR	CP0	Shut down	880	1 Feb 1972	1 Apr 1978	29 Jun 2020
Flamanville	1	PWR	P4 REP 1300	Operational	1330	1 Dec 1979	1 Dec 1986	
Flamanville	2	PWR	P4 REP 1300	Operational	1330	1 May 1980	9 Mar 1987	
Flamanville	3	PWR	EPR	Operational	1630	3 Dec 2007	5 May 2026	
Golfech	1	PWR	P4 REP 1300	Operational	1310	17 Nov 1982	1 Feb 1991	
Golfech	2	PWR	P4 REP 1300	Operational	1310	1 Oct 1984	4 Mar 1994	
Gravelines	1	PWR	CP1	Operational	910	1 Feb 1975	25 Nov 1980	
Gravelines	2	PWR	CP1	Operational	910	1 Mar 1975	1 Dec 1980	
Gravelines	3	PWR	CP1	Operational	910	1 Dec 1975	1 Jun 1981	
Gravelines	4	PWR	CP1	Operational	910	1 Apr 1976	1 Oct 1981	
Gravelines	5	PWR	CP1	Operational	910	1 Oct 1979	15 Jan 1985	
Gravelines	6	PWR	CP1	Operational	910	1 Oct 1979	25 Oct 1985	
Gravelines	7	PWR	EPR2	Planned	1670			
Gravelines	8	PWR	EPR2	Planned	1670			
Nogent	1	PWR	P4 REP 1300	Operational	1310	26 May 1981	24 Feb 1988	
Nogent	2	PWR	P4 REP 1300	Operational	1310	1 Jan 1982	1 May 1989	
Paluel	1	PWR	P4 REP 1300	Operational	1330	15 Aug 1977	1 Dec 1985	
Paluel	2	PWR	P4 REP 1300	Operational	1330	1 Jan 1978	1 Dec 1985	
Paluel	3	PWR	P4 REP 1300	Operational	1330	1 Feb 1979	1 Feb 1986	
Paluel	4	PWR	P4 REP 1300	Operational	1330	1 Feb 1980	1 Jun 1986	
Penly	1	PWR	P4 REP 1300	Operational	1330	1 Sep 1982	1 Dec 1990	
Penly	2	PWR	P4 REP 1300	Operational	1330	1 Aug 1984	1 Nov 1992	
Penly	3	PWR	EPR2	Planned	1670	(2024)		
Penly	4	PWR	EPR2	Planned	1670	(2024)		
Phénix	1	FBR	PH-250	Shut down	130	1 Nov 1968	14 Jul 1974	1 Feb 2010
Saint-Alban	1	PWR	P4 REP 1300	Operational	1335	29 Jan 1979	1 May 1986	
Saint-Alban	2	PWR	P4 REP 1300	Operational	1335	31 Jul 1979	1 Mar 1987	
Saint-Laurent	A-1	GCR	UNGG	Shut down	390	1 Oct 1963	1 Jun 1969	18 Apr 1990
Saint-Laurent	A-2	GCR	UNGG	Shut down	465	1 Jan 1966	1 Nov 1971	27 May 1992
Saint-Laurent	B-1	PWR	CP2	Operational	915	1 May 1976	1 Aug 1983	
Saint-Laurent	B-2	PWR	CP2	Operational	915	1 Jul 1976	1 Aug 1983	
Superphénix	1	FBR	Na-1200	Shut down/in decommissioning	1200	13 Dec 1976	1 Dec 1986	31 Dec 1998
Tricastin	1	PWR	CP1	Operational	915	1 Nov 1974	1 Dec 1980	
Tricastin	2	PWR	CP1	Operational	915	1 Dec 1974	1 Dec 1980	
Tricastin	3	PWR	CP1	Operational	915	1 Apr 1975	11 May 1981	
Tricastin	4	PWR	CP1	Operational	915	1 May 1975	1 Nov 1981	

== Germany ==
Plant name	Unit No.	Type	Model	Status	Capacity (MW)	Begin building	Commercial operation	Closed
AVR	1	HTGR	PBR Prototype	Shut down	13	1 Aug 1961	19 May 1969	31 Dec 1988
Biblis	1	PWR	Siemens-KWU	Shut down/in decommissioning	1167	1 Jan 1970	26 Feb 1975	6 Aug 2011
Biblis	2	PWR	KWU	Shut down/in decommissioning	1240	1 Feb 1972	31 Jan 1977	6 Aug 2011
Brokdorf	1	PWR	KWU	Shut down	1410	1 Jan 1976	22 Dec 1986	31 Dec 2021
Brunsbüttel	1	BWR	BWR-69	Shut down	771	15 Apr 1970	9 Feb 1977	6 Aug 2011
Emsland	1	PWR	Konvoi (KWU)	Shut down	1329	10 Aug 1982	20 Jun 1988	15 Apr 2023
Grafenrheinfeld	1	PWR	KWU	Shut down	1275	1 Jan 1975	17 Jun 1982	27 Jun 2015
Greifswald	1	PWR	VVER-440/V-230	Shut down/in decommissioning	408	1 Mar 1970	12 Jul 1974	14 Feb 1990
Greifswald	2	PWR	VVER-440/V-230	Shut down/in decommissioning	408	1 Mar 1970	16 Apr 1975	14 Feb 1990
Greifswald	3	PWR	VVER-440/V-230	Shut down/in decommissioning	408	1 Apr 1972	1 May 1978	28 Feb 1990
Greifswald	4	PWR	VVER-440/V-230	Shut down/in decommissioning	408	1 Apr 1972	1 Nov 1979	22 Jul 1990
Greifswald	5	PWR	VVER-440/V-213	Shut down/in decommissioning	408	1 Dec 1976	1 Nov 1989	24 Nov 1989
Greifswald	6	PWR	VVER-440/V-213	Finished; never entered service	408			
Grohnde	1	PWR	KWU	Shut down	1360	1 Jun 1976	1 Feb 1985	31 Dec 2021
Grosswelzheim	1	BWR	BWR	Dismantled	25	1 Jan 1965	2 Aug 1970	20 Apr 1971
Gundremmingen	A	BWR	GE, BWR-1	Shut down/in decommissioning	237	12 Dec 1962	12 Apr 1967	13 Jan 1977
Gundremmingen	B	BWR	BWR-72 (KWU)	Shut down	1284	20 Jul 1976	19 Jul 1984	31 Dec 2017
Gundremmingen	C	BWR	BWR-72 (KWU)	Shut down	1288	20 Jul 1976	18 Jan 1985	31 Dec 2021
Isar	1	BWR	BWR-69	Shut down/in decommissioning	878	1 May 1972	21 Mar 1979	6 Aug 2011
Isar	2	PWR	Konvoi (KWU)	Shut down	1410	15 Sep 1982	9 Apr 1988	15 Apr 2023
Kahl	1	BWR	BWR	Dismantled	15	1 Jul 1958	1 Feb 1962	25 Nov 1985
SNR-300	1	FBR		Finished; never entered service		1972		1985
KNK II	1	FBR		Shut down	17	1 Sep 1974	3 Mar 1979	23 Aug 1991
Krümmel	1	BWR	BWR-69 (KWU)	Shut down	1346	5 Apr 1974	28 Mar 1984	6 Aug 2011
Lingen	1	BWR	BWR	Shut down	183	1 Oct 1964	1 Oct 1968	5 Jan 1977
Mülheim-Kärlich	1	PWR	B & W	Shut down/in decommissioning	1219	15 Jan 1975	8 Aug 1987	9 Sep 1988
MZFR	1	PHWR	PHWR	Shut down	52	1 Dec 1961	19 Dec 1966	3 May 1984
Neckarwestheim	1	PWR	KWU	Shut down	785	1 Feb 1972	1 Dec 1976	6 Aug 2011
Neckarwestheim	2	PWR	Konvoi (KWU)	Shut down	1310	9 Nov 1982	15 Apr 1989	15 Apr 2023
Niederaichbach	1	HWGCR	Pressure tube reactor	Shut down/decommissioned	100	1 Jun 1966	1 Jan 1973	31 Jul 1974
Obrigheim	1	PWR	Siemens	Shut down/in decommissioning	340	15 Mar 1965	31 Mar 1969	11 May 2005
Philippsburg	1	BWR	BWR-69	Shut down	890	1 Oct 1970	26 Mar 1980	6 Aug 2011
Philippsburg	2	PWR	KWU	Shut down	1402	7 Jul 1977	18 Apr 1985	31 Dec 2019
Rheinsberg	1	PWR	VVER-70	Shut down/in decommissioning	62	1 Jan 1960	11 Oct 1966	1 Jun 1990
Stade	1	PWR	Siemens	Shut down/in decommissioning	640	1 Dec 1967	19 May 1972	4 Nov 2003
Stendal	1	PWR	VVER-1000/V-320	Unfinished		1983		1990
Stendal	2	PWR	VVER-1000/V-320	Unfinished		1983		1990
THTR-300	1	HTGR	PBR	Decommissioned	296	3 May 1971	1 Jun 1987	29 Sep 1988
Unterweser	1	PWR	KWU	Shut down/in decommissioning	1345	1 Jul 1972	6 Sep 1979	6 Aug 2011
Würgassen	1	BWR	BWR-69 (AEG)	Shut down/in decommissioning	640	26 Jan 1968	11 Nov 1975	26 Aug 1994

== Hungary ==
Plant name	Unit No.	Type	Model	Status	Capacity (MW)	Begin building	Commercial operation	Closed
Paks	1	PWR	VVER-440/V-213	Operational	470	1 Aug 1974	10 Aug 1983	
Paks	2	PWR	VVER-440/V-213	Operational	473	1 Aug 1974	14 Nov 1984	
Paks	3	PWR	VVER-440/V-213	Operational	473	1 Oct 1979	1 Dec 1986	
Paks	4	PWR	VVER-440/V-213	Operational	471	1 Oct 1979	1 Nov 1987	
Paks	5	PWR	VVER-1200/V-529	Under construction	1114	5 Feb 2026		
Paks	6	PWR	VVER-1200/V-529	Planned	1114	(2026)		

== India ==
Plant name	Unit No.	Type	Model	Status	Capacity (MW)	Begin building	Commercial operation	Closed
Chutka	1	PHWR	IPHWR-700	Planned	630			
Chutka	2	PHWR	IPHWR-700	Planned	630			
Gorakhpur	1	PHWR	IPHWR-700	Under Construction	630	2022		
Gorakhpur	2	PHWR	IPHWR-700	Under Construction	630	2022		
Gorakhpur	3	PHWR	IPHWR-700	Planned	630			
Gorakhpur	4	PHWR	IPHWR-700	Planned	630			
Kaiga	1	PHWR	IPHWR-220	Operation suspended (Under maintenance)	202	1 Sep 1989	16 Nov 2000	
Kaiga	2	PHWR	IPHWR-220	Operational	202	1 Dec 1989	16 Mar 2000	
Kaiga	3	PHWR	IPHWR-220	Operational	202	30 Mar 2002	6 May 2007	
Kaiga	4	PHWR	IPHWR-220	Operational	202	10 May 2002	20 Jan 2011	
Kaiga	5	PHWR	IPHWR-700	Under construction	630	1 Mar 2026		
Kaiga	6	PHWR	IPHWR-700	Under construction	630	1 Mar 2026		
Kakrapar	1	PHWR	IPHWR-220	Operational	202	1 Dec 1984	6 May 1993	
Kakrapar	2	PHWR	IPHWR-220	Operational	202	1 Apr 1985	1 Sep 1995	
Kakrapar	3	PHWR	IPHWR-700	Operational	630	22 Nov 2010	30 Jun 2023	
Kakrapar	4	PHWR	IPHWR-700	Operational	630	22 Nov 2010	31 Mar 2024	
Kudankulam	1	PWR	VVER-1000/V-412	Operational	932	31 Mar 2002	31 Dec 2014	
Kudankulam	2	PWR	VVER-1000/V-412	Operational	932	4 Jul 2002	31 Mar 2017	
Kudankulam	3	PWR	VVER-1000/V-412	Under construction	917	30 Jun 2017	(2026)	
Kudankulam	4	PWR	VVER-1000/V-412	Under construction	917	23 Oct 2017	(2027)	
Kudankulam	5	PWR	VVER-1000/V-412	Under construction	917	29 Jun 2021	(2029)	
Kudankulam	6	PWR	VVER-1000/V-412	Under construction	917	20 Dec 2021	(2030)	
Madras	1	PHWR	IPHWR-220	Operation suspended (under maintenance)	205	1 Jan 1971	27 Jan 1984	
Madras	2	PHWR	IPHWR-220	Operational	205	1 Oct 1972	21 Mar 1986	
Madras	3	SFR	PFBR	Operational	490	23 Oct 2004	6 April 2026	
Mahi Banswara	1	PHWR	IPHWR-700	Planned	630		(2031)	
Mahi Banswara	2	PHWR	IPHWR-700	Planned	630		(2032)	
Mahi Banswara	3	PHWR	IPHWR-700	Planned	630		(2033)	
Mahi Banswara	4	PHWR	IPHWR-700	Planned	630		(2034)	
Narora	1	PHWR	IPHWR-220	Operational	202	1 Dec 1976	1 Jan 1991	
Narora	2	PHWR	IPHWR-220	Operational	202	1 Nov 1977	1 Jul 1992	
Rajasthan	1	PHWR	CANDU	Shut down	90	1 Aug 1965	16 Dec 1973	9 Oct 2004
Rajasthan	2	PHWR	CANDU	Operational	187	1 Apr 1968	1 Apr 1981	
Rajasthan	3	PHWR	IPHWR-220	Operational	202	1 Feb 1990	1 Jun 2000	
Rajasthan	4	PHWR	IPHWR-220	Operational	202	1 Oct 1990	23 Dec 2000	
Rajasthan	5	PHWR	IPHWR-220	Operational	202	18 Sep 2002	4 Feb 2010	
Rajasthan	6	PHWR	IPHWR-220	Operational	202	20 Jan 2003	31 Mar 2010	
Rajasthan	7	PHWR	IPHWR-700	Operational	630	18 Jul 2011	15 Apr 2025	
Rajasthan	8	PHWR	IPHWR-700	Under construction	630	30 Sep 2011	(2026)	
Tarapur	1	BWR	BWR-1 (Mark 2)	Operational	150	1 Oct 1964	28 Oct 1969	
Tarapur	2	BWR	BWR-1 (Mark 2)	Operational	150	1 Oct 1964	28 Oct 1969	
Tarapur	3	PHWR	IPHWR-540	Operational	490	12 May 2000	18 Aug 2006	
Tarapur	4	PHWR	IPHWR-540	Operational	490	8 Mar 2000	12 Sep 2005	

== Iran ==
Plant name	Unit No.	Type	Model	Status	Capacity (MW)	Begin building	Commercial operation	Closed
Bushehr	1	PWR	VVER-1000/V-446	Operational	915	1 May 1975	23 Sep 2013	
Bushehr	2	PWR	VVER-1000/V-528	Under construction	915	27 Sep 2019		
Bushehr	3	PWR	VVER-1000	Planned	915			
Darkhovin	1	PWR		Unfinished; restart planned	360			

== Italy ==
Plant name	Unit No.	Type	Model	Status	Capacity (MW)	Begin building	Commercial operation	Closed
Caorso	1	BWR	BWR-4 Mark2	Shut down/in decommissioning	860	1 Jan 1970	1 Dec 1981	1 Jul 1990
Enrico Fermi	1	PWR	WH 4-loop	Shut down/in decommissioning	260	1 Jul 1961	1 Jan 1965	1 Jul 1990
Garigliano	1	BWR	BWR-1	Shut down/in decommissioning	150	1 Nov 1959	1 Jun 1964	1 Mar 1982
Latina	1	GCR	Magnox	Shut down/in decommissioning	153	1 Nov 1958	1 Jan 1964	1 Dec 1987
Montalto	1	BWR		Unfinished	982	1 Jul 1982		1 Jan 1988
Montalto	2	BWR		Unfinished	982	1 Jul 1982		1 Jul 1988
Trino 2	1	PWR		Unfinished	950			23 Dec 1987
Trino 2	2	PWR		Unfinished	950			23 Dec 1987

== Japan ==
Plant name	Unit No.	Type	Model	Status	Capacity (MW)	Begin building	Commercial operation	Closed
Fugen	1	HWLWR	ATR	Shut down	148	10 May 1972	20 Mar 1979	29 Mar 2003
Fukushima Daiichi	1	BWR	BWR-3	Inoperable/Core melt	439	25 Jul 1967	26 Mar 1971	19 May 2011
Fukushima Daiichi	2	BWR	BWR-4	Inoperable/Core melt	760	9 Jun 1969	18 Jul 1974	19 May 2011
Fukushima Daiichi	3	BWR	BWR-4	Inoperable/Core melt	760	28 Dec 1970	27 Mar 1976	19 May 2011
Fukushima Daiichi	4	BWR	BWR-4	Inoperable	760	12 Feb 1973	12 Oct 1978	19 May 2011
Fukushima Daiichi	5	BWR	BWR-4	Shut down	760	22 May 1972	18 Apr 1978	17 Dec 2013
Fukushima Daiichi	6	BWR	BWR-5	Shut down	1067	26 Oct 1973	24 Oct 1979	17 Dec 2013
Fukushima Daini	1	BWR	BWR-5	Shut down	1067	16 Mar 1976	20 Apr 1982	30 Sep 2019
Fukushima Daini	2	BWR	BWR-5	Shut down	1067	25 May 1979	3 Feb 1984	30 Sep 2019
Fukushima Daini	3	BWR	BWR-5	Shut down	1067	23 Mar 1981	21 Jun 1985	30 Sep 2019
Fukushima Daini	4	BWR	BWR-5	Shut down	1067	28 May 1981	25 Aug 1987	30 Sep 2019
Genkai	1	PWR	Mitsubishi (2-loop)	Shut down	529	15 Sep 1971	15 Oct 1975	27 Apr 2015
Genkai	2	PWR	Mitsubishi (2-loop)	Shut down	529	1 Feb 1977	30 Mar 1981	9 Apr 2019
Genkai	3	PWR	Mitsubishi (4-loop)	Operational	1127	1 Jun 1988	18 Mar 1994	
Genkai	4	PWR	Mitsubishi (4-loop)	Operational	1127	15 Jul 1992	25 Jul 1997	
Hamaoka	1	BWR	BWR-4	Shut down	515	10 Jun 1971	17 Mar 1976	30 Jan 2009
Hamaoka	2	BWR	BWR-4	Shut down	806	14 Jun 1974	29 Nov 1978	30 Jan 2009
Hamaoka	3	BWR	BWR-5	Operation suspended (under review)	1056	18 Apr 1983	28 Aug 1987	
Hamaoka	4	BWR	BWR-5	Operation suspended (under review)	1092	13 Oct 1989	3 Sep 1993	
Hamaoka	5	BWR	ABWR	Operation suspended	1325	12 Jul 2000	18 Jan 2005	
Higashidōri (Tōhoku)	1	BWR	BWR-5	Operation suspended (under review)	1067	7 Nov 2000	8 Dec 2005	
Higashidōri (Tokyo)	1	BWR	ABWR	Unfinished; restart planned	1350	25 Jan 2011		
Ikata	1	PWR	Mitsubishi (2-loop)	Shut down	538	1 Sep 1973	30 Sep 1977	25 Mar 2016
Ikata	2	PWR	Mitsubishi (2-loop)	Shut down	538	1 Aug 1978	19 Mar 1982	27 Mar 2018
Ikata	3	PWR	Mitsubishi (3-loop)	Operational	846	1 Oct 1990	15 Dec 1994	
Kashiwazaki-Kariwa	1	BWR	BWR-5	Operation suspended	1067	5 Jun 1980	18 Sep 1985	
Kashiwazaki-Kariwa	2	BWR	BWR-5	Operation suspended	1067	18 Nov 1985	28 Sep 1990	
Kashiwazaki-Kariwa	3	BWR	BWR-5	Operation suspended	1067	7 Mar 1989	11 Aug 1993	
Kashiwazaki-Kariwa	4	BWR	BWR-5	Operation suspended	1067	5 Mar 1990	11 Aug 1994	
Kashiwazaki-Kariwa	5	BWR	BWR-5	Operation suspended	1067	20 Jun 1985	10 Apr 1990	
Kashiwazaki-Kariwa	6	BWR	ABWR	Operational	1315	3 Nov 1992	7 Nov 1996	
Kashiwazaki-Kariwa	7	BWR	ABWR	Operation suspended (restart approved)	1315	1 Jul 1993	2 Jul 1997	
Mihama	1	PWR	Mitsubishi (2-loop)	Shut down	320	1 Feb 1967	28 Nov 1970	Mar 2015
Mihama	2	PWR	Mitsubishi (2-loop)	Shut down	470	29 May 1968	25 Jul 1972	Mar 2015
Mihama	3	PWR	Mitsubishi (3-loop)	Operational	780	7 Aug 1972	1 Dec 1976	
Monju	1	FBR		Shut down	246	10 May 1986	29 Aug 1995	5 Dec 2017
Ōi	1	PWR	W (4-loop)	Shut down	1120	26 Oct 1972	27 Mar 1979	Dec 2017
Ōi	2	PWR	Westinghouse (4-loop)	Shut down	1120	8 Dec 1972	5 Dec 1979	Dec 2017
Ōi	3	PWR	Mitsubishi (4-loop)	Operational	1127	3 Oct 1987	18 Dec 1991	
Ōi	4	PWR	Mitsubishi (4-loop)	Operational	1127	13 Jun 1988	2 Feb 1993	
Ōma	1	BWR	ABWR	Under construction	1325	7 May 2010		
Onagawa	1	BWR	BWR-4	Shut down	498	8 Jul 1980	1 Jun 1984	21 Dec 2018
Onagawa	2	BWR	BWR-5	Operational	796	12 Apr 1991	28 Jul 1995	
Onagawa	3	BWR	BWR-5	Operation suspended	796	23 Jan 1998	30 Jan 2002	
Sendai	1	PWR	Mitsubishi (3-loop)	Operational	846	15 Dec 1979	4 Jul 1984	
Sendai	2	PWR	Mitsubishi (3-loop)	Operational	846	12 Oct 1981	28 Nov 1985	
Shika	1	BWR	BWR-5	Operation suspended	505	1 Jul 1989	30 Jul 1993	
Shika	2	BWR	ABWR	Operation suspended (under review)	1108	20 Aug 2001	15 Mar 2006	
Shimane	1	BWR	BWR-3	Shut down	439	2 Jul 1970	29 Mar 1974	Mar 2015
Shimane	2	BWR	BWR-5	Operational	789	2 Feb 1985	10 Feb 1989	
Shimane	3	BWR	ABWR	Under construction	1325	12 Oct 2007		
Takahama	1	PWR	Mitsubishi (3-loop)	Operational	780	25 Apr 1970	14 Nov 1974	
Takahama	2	PWR	Mitsubishi (3-loop)	Operational	780	9 Mar 1971	14 Nov 1975	
Takahama	3	PWR	Mitsubishi (3-loop)	Operational	830	12 Dec 1980	17 Jan 1985	
Takahama	4	PWR	Mitsubishi (3-loop)	Operational	830	19 Mar 1981	5 Jun 1985	
Tōkai	1	GCR	Magnox	Shut down	137	1 Mar 1961	25 Jul 1966	31 Mar 1998
Tōkai	2	BWR	BWR-5	Operation suspended (restart approved)	1060	3 Oct 1973	28 Nov 1978	
Tomari	1	PWR	Mitsubishi (2-loop)	Operation suspended (under review)	550	18 Apr 1985	22 Jun 1989	
Tomari	2	PWR	Mitsubishi (2-loop)	Operation suspended (under review)	550	13 Jun 1985	12 Apr 1991	
Tomari	3	PWR	Mitsubishi (3-loop)	Operation suspended (restart approved)	866	18 Nov 2004	22 Dec 2009	
Tsuruga	1	BWR	BWR-2	Shut down	340	24 Nov 1966	14 Mar 1970	Mar 2015
Tsuruga	2	PWR	Mitsubishi (4-loop)	Operation suspended (under review)	1108	6 Nov 1982	17 Feb 1987	

== Kazakhstan ==
Plant name	Unit No.	Type	Model	Status	Capacity (MW)	Begin building	Commercial operation	Closed
Aktau	1	FBR	BN-350	Shut down/in decommissioning	350	1 Oct 1964	16 Jul 1973	22 Apr 1999

== Lithuania ==
Plant name	Unit No.	Type	Model	Status	Capacity (MW)	Begin building	Commercial operation	Closed
Ignalina	1	LWGR	RBMK-1500	Shut down/in decommissioning	1185	1 May 1977	31 Dec 1983	31 Dec 2004
Ignalina	2	LWGR	RBMK-1500	Shut down/in decommissioning	1185	1 Jan 1978	Aug 1987	31 Dec 2009
Ignalina	3	LWGR	RBMK-1500	Unfinished	1185			

== Mexico ==
Plant name	Unit No.	Type	Model	Status	Capacity (MW)	Begin building	Commercial operation	Closed
Laguna Verde	1	BWR	BWR-5	Operational	804	1 Oct 1976	28 Jul 1990	
Laguna Verde	2	BWR	BWR-5	Operational	800	1 Jun 1977	10 Apr 1995	

== Netherlands ==
Plant name	Unit No.	Type	Model	Status	Capacity (MW)	Begin building	Commercial operation	Closed
Borssele	1	PWR	KWU 2LP	Operational	482	1 Jul 1969	26 Oct 1973	(2033)
Dodewaard	1	BWR	BWR-2	Shut down	55	1 May 1965	26 Mar 1969	26 Mar 1997

== North Korea ==
Plant name	Unit No.	Type	Model	Status	Capacity (MW)	Begin building	Commercial operation	Closed
Yongbyon	1	GCR	Magnox (Pu-production)	Shut down	5			1994
Yongbyon	2	LWR		Pre-operational testing	30			
Taechon	1			Unfinished	200			1994
Kumho	1	PWR		Unfinished	1000			2003
Kumho	2	PWR		Unfinished	1000			2003

== Pakistan ==
Plant name	Unit No.	Type	Model	Status	Capacity (MW)	Begin building	Commercial operation	Closed
Chashma	1	PWR	CNP-300	Operational	300	1 Aug 1993	15 Sep 2000	
Chashma	2	PWR	CNP-300	Operational	300	28 Dec 2005	18 May 2011	
Chashma	3	PWR	CNP-300	Operational	315	28 May 2011	6 Dec 2016	
Chashma	4	PWR	CNP-300	Operational	313	18 Dec 2011	19 Sep 2017	
Chashma	5	PWR	Hualong One	Under construction	1100	30 Dec 2024		
Karachi	1	PHWR	CANDU	Shut down	90	1 Aug 1966	7 Dec 1972	1 Aug 2021
Karachi	2	PWR	Hualong One	Operational	1014	23 May 2013	19 Mar 2021	
Karachi	3	PWR	Hualong One	Operational	1014	31 May 2016	18 Apr 2022	

== Philippines ==
Plant name	Unit No.	Type	Model	Status	Capacity (MW)	Begin building	Commercial operation	Closed
Bataan	1	PWR	WH (3-loop)	Unfinished; restart planned	621	1976		1986

== Poland ==
Plant name	Unit No.	Type	Model	Status	Capacity (MW)	Begin building	Commercial operation	Closed
Żarnowiec	1	PWR	VVER-440/V-213	Unfinished	440	31 Mar 1982		4 Sep 1990
Żarnowiec	2	PWR	VVER-440/V-213	Unfinished	440	31 Mar 1982		4 Sep 1990
Żarnowiec	3	PWR	VVER-440/V-213	Cancelled	440			
Żarnowiec	4	PWR	VVER-440/V-213	Cancelled	440			
Warta (Klempicz)	1	PWR	VVER-1000	Unfinished	1000	1987		22 Apr 1989
Warta (Klempicz)	2	PWR	VVER-1000	Cancelled	1000			
Warta (Klempicz)	3	PWR	VVER-1000	Cancelled	1000			
Warta (Klempicz)	4	PWR	VVER-1000	Cancelled	1000			
Lubiatowo-Kopalino Nuclear Power Plant	1	PWR	AP1000	Planned	1250	(2028)	(2036)	
Lubiatowo-Kopalino Nuclear Power Plant	2	PWR	AP1000	Planned	1250		(2037)	
Lubiatowo-Kopalino Nuclear Power Plant	3	PWR	AP1000	Planned	1250		(2038)	
Pątnów	1	PWR	APR-1400	Planned	1340			
Pątnów	2	PWR	APR-1400	Planned	1340			
Włocławek	1	BWR	BWRX-300	Planned	300		(2030)	
Ostrołęka	1	BWR	BWRX-300	Planned	300		(2030)	
Warsaw	1	BWR	BWRX-300	Planned	300		(2030)	
Tarnobrzeg/Stalowa Wola	1	BWR	BWRX-300	Planned	300		(2030)	
Dąbrowa Górnicza	1	BWR	BWRX-300	Planned	300		(2030)	
Stawy Monowskie	1	BWR	BWRX-300	Planned	300		(2030)	
Kraków	1	BWR	BWRX-300	Planned	300		(2030)	

== Romania ==
Plant name	Unit No.	Type	Model	Status	Capacity (MW)	Begin building	Commercial operation	Closed
Cernavodă	1	PHWR	CANDU-6	Operational	650	31 Mar 1983	2 Dec 1996	
Cernavodă	2	PHWR	CANDU-6	Operational	650	1 Jul 1983	1 Nov 2007	
Cernavodă	3	PHWR	CANDU-6	Unfinished; restart planned	650			
Cernavodă	4	PHWR	CANDU-6	Unfinished; restart planned	650			
Cernavodă	5	PHWR	CANDU-6	Unfinished	650			

== Russia ==
Plant name	Unit No.	Type	Model	Status	Capacity (MW)	Begin building	Commercial operation	Closed
Akademik Lomonosov	1	PWR	KLT-40S	Operational	32	15 Apr 2007	19 Dec 2019	
Akademik Lomonosov	2	PWR	KLT-40S	Operational	32	15 Apr 2007	19 Dec 2019	
Balakovo	1	PWR	VVER-1000/V-320	Operational	950	1 Dec 1980	23 May 1986	
Balakovo	2	PWR	VVER-1000/V-320	Operational	950	1 Aug 1981	18 Jan 1988	
Balakovo	3	PWR	VVER-1000/V-320	Operational	950	1 Nov 1982	8 Apr 1989	
Balakovo	4	PWR	VVER-1000/V-320	Operational	950	1 Apr 1984	22 Dec 1993	
Beloyarsk	1	LWGR	AMB-100	Shut down	102	1 Jun 1958	26 Apr 1964	1 Jan 1983
Beloyarsk	2	LWGR	AMB-200	Shut down	146	1 Jan 1962	1 Dec 1969	1 Jan 1990
Beloyarsk	3	SFR	BN-600	Operational	560	1 Jan 1969	1 Nov 1981	
Beloyarsk	4	SFR	BN-800	Operational	789	18 Jul 2006	10 Dec 2015	
Beloyarsk	5	SFR	BN-1200	Planned	1100			
Bilibino	1	LWGR	EGP-6	Shut down	11	1 Jan 1970	1 Apr 1974	14 Jan 2019
Bilibino	2	LWGR	EGP-6	Shut down	11	1 Jan 1970	1 Feb 1975	3 Dec 2025
Bilibino	3	LWGR	EGP-6	Shut down	11	1 Jan 1970	1 Feb 1976	11 Dec 2025
Bilibino	4	LWGR	EGP-6	Shut down	11	1 Jan 1970	1 Jan 1977	30 Dec 2025
Kalinin	1	PWR	VVER-1000/V-338	Operational	950	1 Feb 1977	12 Jun 1985	
Kalinin	2	PWR	VVER-1000/V-338	Operational	950	1 Feb 1982	3 Mar 1987	
Kalinin	3	PWR	VVER-1000/V-320	Operational	950	1 Oct 1985	8 Nov 2005	
Kalinin	4	PWR	VVER-1000/V-320	Operational	950	1 Aug 1986	25 Dec 2012	
Kaliningrad	1	PWR	VVER-1200/V-491	Unfinished	1109	22 Feb 2012		
Kola	1	PWR	VVER-440/V-230	Operational	441	1 May 1970	28 Dec 1973	
Kola	2	PWR	VVER-440/V-230	Operational	441	1 May 1970	21 Feb 1975	
Kola	3	PWR	VVER-440/V-213	Operational	441	1 Apr 1977	3 Dec 1982	
Kola	4	PWR	VVER-440/V-213	Operational	441	1 Aug 1976	6 Dec 1984	
Kola II	1	PWR	VVER-S-600	Planned	600	(2028)	(2034)	
Kola II	2	PWR	VVER-S-600	Planned	600	(2028)	(2034)	
Kursk	1	LWGR	RBMK-1000	Shut down	925	1 Jun 1972	12 Oct 1977	19 Dec 2021
Kursk	2	LWGR	RBMK-1000	Shut down	925	1 Jan 1973	17 Aug 1979	31 Jan 2024
Kursk	3	LWGR	RBMK-1000	Operational	925	1 Apr 1978	30 Mar 1984	
Kursk	4	LWGR	RBMK-1000	Operational	925	1 May 1981	5 Feb 1986	
Kursk	5	LWGR	RBMK-1000	Unfinished	925	1985		
Kursk	6	LWGR	RBMK-1000	Unfinished	925	1985		
Kursk II	1	PWR	VVER-TOI/V-510	Operational	1115	29 Apr 2018	1 May 2026	
Kursk II	2	PWR	VVER-TOI/V-510	Under construction	1115	15 Apr 2019	(2027)	
Kursk II	3	PWR	VVER-TOI/V-510	Under construction	1115	31 Jan 2026		
Kursk II	4	PWR	VVER-TOI	Planned	1115			
Leningrad	1	LWGR	RBMK-1000	Shut down	925	1 Mar 1970	1 Nov 1974	21 Dec 2018
Leningrad	2	LWGR	RBMK-1000	Shut down	925	1 Jun 1970	11 Feb 1976	10 Nov 2020
Leningrad	3	LWGR	RBMK-1000	Operational	925	1 Dec 1973	29 Jun 1980	
Leningrad	4	LWGR	RBMK-1000	Operational	925	1 Feb 1975	29 Aug 1981	
Leningrad II	1	PWR	VVER-1200/V-491	Operational	1085	25 Oct 2008	29 Oct 2018	
Leningrad II	2	PWR	VVER-1200/V-491	Operational	1085	15 Apr 2010	22 Mar 2021	
Leningrad II	3	PWR	VVER-1200	Under construction	1085	14 Mar 2024	(2030)	
Leningrad II	4	PWR	VVER-1200	Under construction	1085	21 Mar 2025	(2032)	
MPEB No. 1	1	PWR	RITM-200S	Under construction	53	30 Aug 2022	(2027)	
MPEB No. 1	2	PWR	RITM-200S	Under construction	53	30 Aug 2022	(2027)	
MPEB No. 2	1	PWR	RITM-200S	Planned	53	(2022)	(2027)	
MPEB No. 2	2	PWR	RITM-200S	Planned	53	(2022)	(2027)	
MPEB No. 3	1	PWR	RITM-200S	Planned	53	(2022)	(2028)	
MPEB No. 3	2	PWR	RITM-200S	Planned	53	(2022)	(2028)	
MPEB No. 4	1	PWR	RITM-200S	Planned	53	(2022)	(2031)	
MPEB No. 4	2	PWR	RITM-200S	Planned	53	(2022)	(2031)	
Novovoronezh	1	PWR	VVER/V-210	Shut down	197	1 Jul 1957	31 Dec 1964	16 Feb 1988
Novovoronezh	2	PWR	VVER/V-365	Shut down	336	1 Jun 1964	14 Apr 1970	29 Aug 1990
Novovoronezh	3	PWR	VVER-440/V-179	Shut down	385	1 Jul 1967	29 Jun 1972	25 Dec 2016
Novovoronezh	4	PWR	VVER 440/V-179	Operational	385	1 Jul 1967	24 Mar 1973	
Novovoronezh	5	PWR	VVER-1000/V-187	Operational	950	1 Mar 1974	20 Feb 1981	
Novovoronezh II	1	PWR	VVER-1200/V-392M	Operational	1114	24 Jun 2008	27 Feb 2017	
Novovoronezh II	2	PWR	VVER-1200/V-392M	Operational	1114	12 Jul 2009	6 Nov 2019	
Novovoronezh II	3	PWR	VVER-1200	Planned	1175			
Obninsk	1	LWGR	AM-1	Shut down	5	1 Jan 1951	1 Dec 1954	29 Apr 2002
Rostov	1	PWR	VVER-1000/V-320	Operational	950	1 Sep 1981	25 Dec 2001	
Rostov	2	PWR	VVER-1000/V-320	Operational	950	1 May 1983	10 Dec 2010	
Rostov	3	PWR	VVER-1000/V-320	Operational	950	15 Sep 2009	27 Dec 2014	
Rostov	4	PWR	VVER-1000/V-320	Operational	1011	16 Jun 2010	28 Sep 2018	
Sakha	1	PWR	RITM-200N	Planned	55	(2024)	(2028)	
Seversk	1	FBR	BREST-300	Under construction	280	8 Jun 2021	(2026)	
Smolensk	1	LWGR	RBMK-1000	Operational	925	1 Oct 1975	30 Sep 1983	
Smolensk	2	LWGR	RBMK-1000	Operational	925	1 Jun 1976	2 Jul 1985	
Smolensk	3	LWGR	RBMK-1000	Operational	925	1 May 1984	12 Oct 1990	
Smolensk II	1	PWR	VVER-TOI	Planned	1300			
Smolensk II	2	PWR	VVER-TOI	Planned	1300			

== Slovakia ==
Plant name	Unit No.	Type	Model	Status	Capacity (MW)	Begin building	Commercial operation	Closed
Bohunice	A-1	HWGCR	KS 150	Decommissioned	93	1 Aug 1958	25 Dec 1972	22 Feb 1977
Bohunice	1	PWR	VVER-440/V-230	Decommissioned	408	24 Apr 1972	1 Apr 1980	31 Dec 2006
Bohunice	2	PWR	VVER-440/V-230	Decommissioned	408	24 Apr 1972	1 Jan 1981	31 Dec 2008
Bohunice	3	PWR	VVER-440/V-213	Operational	472	1 Dec 1976	14 Feb 1985	(2045)
Bohunice	4	PWR	VVER-440/V-213	Operational	471	1 Dec 1976	18 Dec 1985	(2045)
Mochovce	1	PWR	VVER-440 V-213	Operational	470	13 Oct 1983	29 Oct 1998	(2058)
Mochovce	2	PWR	VVER-440/V-213	Operational	470	13 Oct 1983	11 Apr 2000	(2060)
Mochovce	3	PWR	VVER-440/V-213	Operational	471	27 Jan 1987	17 Oct 2023	
Mochovce	4	PWR	VVER-440/V-213	Grid Connected	471	27 Jan 1987		

== Slovenia ==
Plant name	Unit No.	Type	Model	Status	Capacity (MW)	Begin building	Commercial operation	Closed
Krško	1	PWR	WH 2 loops	Operational	688	30 Mar 1975	1 Jan 1983	(2043)
Krško	2	PWR	TBD	Planned	1100		(2030)	

== South Africa ==
Plant name	Unit No.	Type	Model	Status	Capacity (MW)	Begin building	Commercial operation	Closed
Koeberg	1	PWR	CP1 (France)	Operational	930	1 Jul 1976	21 Jul 1984	
Koeberg	2	PWR	CP1 (France)	Operational	930	1 Jul 1976	9 Nov 1985	

== South Korea ==
Plant name	Unit No.	Type	Model	Status	Capacity (MW)	Begin building	Commercial operation (planned)	Closed
Hanbit	1	PWR	WH F	Operational	960	4 Jun 1981	25 Aug 1986	
Hanbit	2	PWR	WH F	Operational	958	10 Dec 1981	10 Jun 1987	
Hanbit	3	PWR	OPR-1000	Operational	997	23 Dec 1989	31 Mar 1995	
Hanbit	4	PWR	OPR-1000	Operational	997	26 May 1990	1 Jan 1996	
Hanbit	5	PWR	OPR-1000	Operational	997	29 Jun 1997	21 May 2002	
Hanbit	6	PWR	OPR-1000	Operational	995	20 Nov 1997	24 Dec 2002	
Hanul	1	PWR	CP1 (France)	Operational	960	26 Jan 1983	10 Sep 1988	
Hanul	2	PWR	CP1 (France)	Operational	962	5 Jul 1983	30 Sep 1989	
Hanul	3	PWR	OPR-1000	Operational	994	21 Jul 1993	11 Aug 1998	
Hanul	4	PWR	OPR-1000	Operational	998	1 Nov 1993	31 Dec 1999	
Hanul	5	PWR	OPR-1000	Operational	996	1 Oct 1999	29 Jul 2004	
Hanul	6	PWR	OPR-1000	Operational	996	29 Sep 2000	22 Apr 2005	
Shin-Hanul	1	PWR	APR-1400	Operational	1340	10 Jul 2012	7 Dec 2022	
Shin-Hanul	2	PWR	APR-1400	Operational	1340	19 Jul 2012	5 Apr 2024	
Shin-Hanul	3	PWR	APR-1400	Under construction	1340	20 May 2025	(2032)	
Shin-Hanul	4	PWR	APR-1400	Under construction	1340	29 May 2026	(2033)	
Kori	1	PWR	WH 60	Shut down	576	27 Apr 1972	29 Apr 1978	18 Jun 2017
Kori	2	PWR	WH F	Operational	640	4 Dec 1977	25 Jul 1983	
Kori	3	PWR	WH F	Operational	1011	1 Oct 1979	30 Sep 1985	
Kori	4	PWR	WH F	Operational	1012	1 Apr 1980	29 Apr 1986	
Shin-Kori	1	PWR	OPR-1000	Operational	996	16 Jun 2006	28 Feb 2011	
Shin-Kori	2	PWR	OPR-1000	Operational	996	5 Jun 2007	20 Jul 2012	
Saeul	1	PWR	APR-1400	Operational	1416	16 Oct 2008	15 Jan 2016	
Saeul	2	PWR	APR-1400	Operational	1418	19 Aug 2009	29 Aug 2019	
Saeul	3	PWR	APR-1400	Under construction	1400	1 Apr 2017		
Saeul	4	PWR	APR-1400	Under construction	1400	20 Sep 2018		
Wolsong	1	PHWR	CANDU-6	Shut down	657	30 Oct 1977	22 Apr 1983	24 Dec 2019
Wolsong	2	PHWR	CANDU-6	Operational	655	22 Jun 1992	1 Jul 1997	
Wolsong	3	PHWR	CANDU-6	Operational	684	17 Mar 1994	1 Jul 1998	
Wolsong	4	PHWR	CANDU-6	Operational	688	22 Jul 1994	1 Oct 1999	
Shin-Wolsong	1	PWR	OPR-1000	Operational	991	20 Nov 2007	31 Jul 2012	
Shin-Wolsong	2	PWR	OPR-1000	Operational	960	23 Sep 2008	26 Feb 2015	

== Spain ==
Plant name	Unit No.	Type	Model	Status	Capacity (MW)	Begin building	Commercial operation	Closed
Almaraz	1	PWR	WH 3 loops	Operational	1011	3 Jul 1973	1 Sep 1983	
Almaraz	2	PWR	WH 3 loops	Operational	1006	3 Jul 1973	1 Jul 1984	
Ascó	1	PWR	WH 3 loops	Operational	995	16 May 1974	10 Dec 1984	
Ascó	2	PWR	WH-3 loops	Operational	997	7 Mar 1975	31 Mar 1986	
Cofrentes	1	BWR	BWR-6	Operational	1064	9 Sep 1975	11 Mar 1985	
José Cabrera	1	PWR	WH 1 loop	Shut down/in decommissioning	141	24 Jun 1964	13 Aug 1969	30 Apr 2006
Lemoniz	1	PWR		Unfinished		1972		1984
Lemoniz	2	PWR		Unfinished		1972		1984
Santa María de Garoña	1	BWR	BWR-3	Shut down/in decommissioning	446	11 May 1971	15 Feb 1975	6 Jul 2013
Trillo	1	PWR	KWU 3 loops	Operational	1003	17 Aug 1979	6 Aug 1988	
Valdecaballeros	1	BWR		Unfinished		1975		1984
Valdecaballeros	2	BWR		Unfinished		1975		1984
Vandellòs	1	GCR	UNGG	Shut down/in decommissioning	480	1967	2 Aug 1972	31 Jul 1990
Vandellòs	2	PWR	WH 3 loops	Operational	1045	29 Dec 1980	8 Mar 1988	

== Sweden ==
Plant name	Unit No.	Type	Model	Status	Capacity (MW)	Begin building	Commercial operation	Closed	
Ågesta	1	PHWR	R3	Shut down/in decommissioning	10	1 Dec 1957	1 May 1964	2 Jun 1974	(Note: The full reactor model name is R3/Adam.)
Barsebäck	1	BWR	ASEA-II	Shut down/in decommissioning	600	1 Feb 1971	1 Jul 1975	30 Nov 1999	(Note: The full reactor model name is ASEA-ATOM Gen II.)
Barsebäck	2	BWR	ASEA-II	Shut down/in decommissioning	600	1 Jan 1973	1 Jul 1977	31 May 2005	(Note: The full reactor model name is ASEA-ATOM Gen II.)
Forsmark	1	BWR	ASEA-III, BWR-2500	Operational	986	1 Jun 1973	10 Dec 1980		(Note: The full reactor model name is ASEA-ATOM Gen III, BWR-2500, BWR 69.)
Forsmark	2	BWR	ASEA-III, BWR-2500	Operational	1116	1 Jan 1975	7 Jul 1981		(Note: The full reactor model name is ASEA-ATOM Gen III, BWR-2500, BWR 69.)
Forsmark	3	BWR	ASEA-IV, BWR-3000	Operational	1167	1 Jan 1979	18 Aug 1985		(Note: The full reactor model name is ASEA-ATOM Gen IV, BWR-3000, BWR 75.)
Oskarshamn	1	BWR	ASEA-I	Shut down/in decommissioning	473	1 Aug 1966	6 Feb 1972	19 Jun 2017	(Note: The full reactor model name is ASEA-ATOM Gen I.)
Oskarshamn	2	BWR	ASEA-II	Shut down/in decommissioning	638	1 Sep 1969	1 Jan 1975	22 Dec 2016	(Note: The full reactor model name is ASEA-ATOM Gen II.)
Oskarshamn	3	BWR	ASEA-IV, BWR-3000	Operational	1450	1 May 1980	15 Aug 1985		(Note: The full reactor model name is ASEA-ATOM Gen IV, BWR-3000, BWR 75.)
Marviken	1	BHWR	R4	Unfinished	196	1 Apr 1965		27 May 1970	(Note: The full reactor model name is R4/Eva. Construction date is approximate. Data are from Swedish Radiation Safety Authority.)
Ringhals	1	BWR	ASEA-I	Shut down/in decommissioning	881	1 Feb 1969	1 Jan 1976	31 Dec 2020	(Note: The full reactor model name is ASEA-ATOM Gen I. Closed at midnight on New Year's Eve.)
Ringhals	2	PWR	WH 3-loops	Shut down/in decommissioning	904	1 Oct 1970	1 May 1975	30 Dec 2019	(Note: The full reactor model name is Westinghouse 3-loops.)
Ringhals	3	PWR	WH 3-loops	Operational	1062	1 Sep 1972	9 Sep 1981		(Note: The full reactor model name is Westinghouse 3-loops.)
Ringhals	4	PWR	WH 3-loops	Operational	1104	1 Nov 1973	21 Nov 1983		(Note: The full reactor model name is Westinghouse 3-loops.)

== Switzerland ==
Plant name	Unit No.	Type	Model	Status	Capacity (MW)	Begin building	Commercial operation	Closed
Beznau	1	PWR	WH 2-loops	Operational	365	1 Sep 1965	1 Sep 1969	(2029)
Beznau	2	PWR	WH 2-loops	Operational	365	1 Jan 1968	1 Dec 1971	(2031)
Gösgen	1	PWR	KWU 3-loops	Operational	1010	1 Dec 1973	1 Nov 1979	
Leibstadt	1	BWR	BWR-6	Operational	1220	1 Jan 1974	15 Dec 1984	
Lucens	1	HWGCR	HWGCR	Decommissioned	6	1 Apr 1962	29 Dec 1966	21 Jan 1969
Mühleberg	1	BWR	BWR-4	Shut down/in decommissioning	373	1 Mar 1967	6 Nov 1972	20 Dec 2019

== Taiwan ==
Plant name	Unit No.	Type	Model	Status	Capacity (MW)	Begin building	Commercial operation	Closed
Jinshan	1	BWR	BWR-4	Shut down/in decommissioning	636	2 Jun 1972	10 Dec 1978	3 Oct 2018
Jinshan	2	BWR	BWR-4	Shut down/in decommissioning	636	7 Dec 1973	15 Jul 1979	3 Oct 2018
Kuosheng	1	BWR	BWR-6	Shut down	985	19 Nov 1975	28 Dec 1981	1 Jul 2021
Kuosheng	2	BWR	BWR-6	Shut down	985	15 Mar 1976	16 Mar 1983	15 Mar 2023
Lungmen	1	BWR	ABWR	Unfinished	1350	31 Mar 1999		27 April 2014
Lungmen	2	BWR	ABWR	Unfinished	1350	30 Aug 1999		27 April 2014
Maanshan	1	PWR	WH 312 3-loop	Shut down	951	21 Aug 1978	27 Jul 1984	28 Jul 2024
Maanshan	2	PWR	WH 312 3-loop	Shut down	951	21 Feb 1979	18 May 1985	17 May 2025

== Turkey ==
Plant name	Unit No.	Type	Model	Status	Capacity (MW)	Begin building	Commercial operation	Closed
Akkuyu	1	PWR	VVER-1200/V-509	Under construction	1114	3 Apr 2018	(2026)	
Akkuyu	2	PWR	VVER-1200/V-509	Under construction	1114	8 Apr 2020	(2027)	
Akkuyu	3	PWR	VVER-1200/V-509	Under construction	1114	10 Mar 2021	(2027)	
Akkuyu	4	PWR	VVER-1200/V-509	Under construction	1114	21 Jul 2022	(2028)	
Sinop	1	PWR	APR+	Planned	1120		(2035)	
Sinop	2	PWR	APR+	Planned	1120		(2035)	
Sinop	3	PWR	APR+	Planned	1120		(2035)	
Sinop	4	PWR	APR+	Planned	1120		(2035)	
Thracian	1	PWR	CAP1400	Planned	1500		(2040)	
Thracian	2	PWR	CAP1400	Planned	1500		(2040)	
Thracian	3	PWR	CAP1400	Planned	1500		(2040)	
Thracian	4	PWR	CAP1400	Planned	1500		(2040)	

== Ukraine ==
Plant name	Unit No.	Type	Model	Status	Capacity (MW)	Begin building	Commercial operation	Closed
Chernobyl	1	LWGR	RBMK-1000	Shut down/in decommissioning	740	1 Mar 1970	27 May 1978	30 Nov 1996
Chernobyl	2	LWGR	RBMK-1000	Shut down/in decommissioning	925	1 Feb 1973	28 May 1979	11 Oct 1991
Chernobyl	3	LWGR	RBMK-1000	Shut down/in decommissioning	925	1 Mar 1976	8 Jun 1982	15 Dec 2000
Chernobyl	4	LWGR	RBMK-1000	Destroyed	925	1 Apr 1979	26 Mar 1984	26 Apr 1986
Chernobyl	5	LWGR	RBMK-1000	Unfinished	925	1 Jul 1981		23 May 1989
Chernobyl	6	LWGR	RBMK-1000	Unfinished	925	1 Jul 1983		23 May 1989
Chyhyryn	1	PWR	AP1000	Planned	1100			
Chyhyryn	2	PWR	AP1000	Planned	1100			
Chyhyryn	3	PWR	AP1000	Planned	1100			
Chyhyryn	4	PWR	AP1000	Planned	1100			
Crimean	1	PWR	VVER-1000	Unfinished	950	26 Jan 1984		1987
Crimean	2	PWR	VVER-1000	Unfinished	950	26 Jan 1984		1987
Kharkiv	1	PWR	VVER-1000	Unfinished	900	1988		1990
Kharkiv	2	PWR	VVER-1000	Unfinished	900	1988		1990
Khmelnytskyi	1	PWR	VVER-1000/V-320	Operational	950	1 Nov 1981	13 Aug 1988	
Khmelnytskyi	2	PWR	VVER-1000/V-320	Operational	950	1 Feb 1985	15 Dec 2005	
Khmelnytskyi	3	PWR	VVER-1000	Under construction	950	1 Sep 1985	(2026)	
Khmelnytskyi	4	PWR	VVER-1000	Under construction	950	1 Jun 1986	(2027)	
Khmelnytskyi	5	PWR	AP1000	Under construction	1100	April 11, 2024	(2029)	
Khmelnytskyi	6	PWR	AP1000	Under construction	1100	April 11, 2024	(2029)	
Odesa	1	PWR	VVER-1000	Unfinished	900			1989
Odesa	2	PWR	VVER-1000	Unfinished	900			1989
Rivne	1	PWR	VVER-440/V-213	Operational	381	1 Aug 1973	22 Sep 1981	
Rivne	2	PWR	VVER-440/V-213	Operational	376	1 Oct 1973	29 Jul 1982	
Rivne	3	PWR	VVER-1000/V-320	Operational	950	1 Feb 1980	16 May 1987	
Rivne	4	PWR	VVER-1000/V-320	Operational	950	1 Aug 1986	6 Apr 2006	
Rivne	5	PWR	AP1000	Planned	1100			
South Ukraine	1	PWR	VVER-1000/V-302	Operational	950	1 Aug 1976	2 Dec 1983	
South Ukraine	2	PWR	VVER-1000/V-338	Operational	950	1 Jul 1981	6 Apr 1985	
South Ukraine	3	PWR	VVER-1000/V-320	Operational	950	1 Nov 1984	29 Dec 1989	
South Ukraine	4	PWR	AP1000	Planned	1100			
Zaporizhzhia	1	PWR	VVER-1000/V-320	Operational	950	1 Apr 1980	25 Dec 1985	
Zaporizhzhia	2	PWR	VVER-1000/V-320	Operational	950	1 Jan 1981	15 Feb 1986	
Zaporizhzhia	3	PWR	VVER-1000/V-320	Operational	950	1 Apr 1982	5 Mar 1987	
Zaporizhzhia	4	PWR	VVER-1000/V-320	Operational	950	1 Apr 1983	14 Apr 1988	
Zaporizhzhia	5	PWR	VVER-1000/V-320	Operational	950	1 Nov 1985	27 Oct 1989	
Zaporizhzhia	6	PWR	VVER-1000/V-320	Operational	950	1 Jun 1986	17 Sep 1996	
Zaporizhzhia	7	PWR	AP1000	Planned	1100			

== United Arab Emirates ==
Plant name	Unit No.	Type	Model	Status	Capacity (MW)	Begin building	Commercial operation	Closed
Barakah	1	PWR	APR-1400	Operational	1345	19 Jul 2012	6 Apr 2021	
Barakah	2	PWR	APR-1400	Operational	1345	16 Apr 2013	24 Mar 2022	
Barakah	3	PWR	APR-1400	Operational	1345	24 Sep 2014	24 Feb 2023	
Barakah	4	PWR	APR-1400	Operational	1345	30 Jul 2015	5 Sep 2024	

== United Kingdom ==
Plant name	Unit No.	Type	Model	Status	Capacity (MW)	Begin building	Commercial operation	Closed
Berkeley	1	GCR	Magnox	Decommissioned	138	1 Jan 1957	12 Jun 1962	31 Mar 1989
Berkeley	2	GCR	Magnox	Decommissioned	138	1 Jan 1957	20 Oct 1962	26 Oct 1988
Bradwell	1	GCR	Magnox	Decommissioned	123	1 Jan 1957	1 Jul 1962	31 Mar 2002
Bradwell	2	GCR	Magnox	Decommissioned	123	1 Jan 1957	12 Nov 1962	30 Mar 2002
Calder Hall	1	GCR	Magnox	Shut down/in decommissioning	49	1 Aug 1953	1 Oct 1956	31 Mar 2003
Calder Hall	2	GCR	Magnox	Shut down/in decommissioning	49	1 Aug 1953	1 Feb 1957	31 Mar 2003
Calder Hall	3	GCR	Magnox	Shut down/in decommissioning	49	1 Aug 1955	1 May 1958	31 Mar 2003
Calder Hall	4	GCR	Magnox	Shut down/in decommissioning	49	1 Aug 1955	1 Apr 1959	31 Mar 2003
Chapelcross	1	GCR	Magnox	Shut down/in decommissioning	48	1 Oct 1955	1 Mar 1959	29 Jun 2004
Chapelcross	2	GCR	Magnox	Shut down/in decommissioning	48	1 Oct 1955	1 Aug 1959	29 Jun 2004
Chapelcross	3	GCR	Magnox	Shut down/in decommissioning	48	1 Oct 1955	1 Dec 1959	29 Jun 2004
Chapelcross	4	GCR	Magnox	Shut down/in decommissioning	48	1 Oct 1955	1 Mar 1960	29 Jun 2004
Dounreay	1	SFR	DFR	Shut down/in decommissioning	11	1 Mar 1955	1 Oct 1962	1 Mar 1977
Dounreay	2	SFR	PFR	Shut down/in decommissioning	234	1 Jan 1966	1 Jul 1976	31 Mar 1994
Dungeness A	A-1	GCR	Magnox	Shut down/in decommissioning	225	1 Jul 1960	28 Oct 1965	31 Dec 2006
Dungeness A	A-2	GCR	Magnox	Shut down/in decommissioning	225	1 Jul 1960	30 Dec 1965	31 Dec 2006
Dungeness B	B-1	GCR	AGR	Shut down	520	1 Oct 1965	1 Apr 1985	7 Jun 2021
Dungeness B	B-2	GCR	AGR	Shut down	520	1 Oct 1965	1 Apr 1989	7 Jun 2021
Hartlepool	1	GCR	AGR	Operational	595	1 Oct 1968	1 Apr 1989	(2030)
Hartlepool	2	GCR	AGR	Operational	585	1 Oct 1968	1 Apr 1989	(2030)
Heysham	A-1	GCR	AGR	Operational	585	1 Dec 1970	1 Apr 1989	(2030)
Heysham	A-2	GCR	AGR	Operational	575	1 Dec 1970	1 Apr 1989	(2030)
Heysham	B-1	GCR	AGR	Operational	610	1 Aug 1980	1 Apr 1989	(2030)
Heysham	B-2	GCR	AGR	Operational	610	1 Aug 1980	1 Apr 1989	(2030)
Hinkley Point A	1	GCR	Magnox	Shut down/in decommissioning	235	1 Nov 1957	30 Mar 1965	23 May 2000
Hinkley Point A	2	GCR	Magnox	Shut down/in decommissioning	235	1 Nov 1957	5 May 1965	23 May 2000
Hinkley Point B	1	GCR	AGR	Shut down/in decommissioning	435	1 Sep 1967	2 Oct 1978	1 Aug 2022
Hinkley Point B	2	GCR	AGR	Shut down/in decommissioning	435	1 Sep 1967	27 Sep 1976	6 Jul 2022
Hinkley Point C	1	PWR	EPR	Under construction	1600	11 Dec 2018	(2030)	
Hinkley Point C	2	PWR	EPR	Under construction	1600	12 Dec 2019	(early 2030s)	
Hunterston A	1	GCR	Magnox	Shut down/in decommissioning	150	1 Oct 1957	5 Feb 1964	30 Mar 1990
Hunterston A	2	GCR	Magnox	Shut down/in decommissioning	150	1 Oct 1957	1 Jul 1964	31 Dec 1989
Hunterston B	1	GCR	AGR	Shut down	460	1 Nov 1967	6 Feb 1976	26 Nov 2021
Hunterston B	2	GCR	AGR	Shut down	460	1 Nov 1967	31 Mar 1977	7 Jan 2022
Oldbury	1	GCR	Magnox	Shut down/in decommissioning	217	1 May 1962	31 Dec 1967	29 Feb 2012
Oldbury	2	GCR	Magnox	Shut down/in decommissioning	217	1 May 1962	30 Sep 1968	30 Jun 2011
Sizewell A	1	GCR	Magnox	Shut down/in decommissioning	210	1 Apr 1961	25 Mar 1966	31 Dec 2006
Sizewell A	2	GCR	Magnox	Shut down/in decommissioning	210	1 Apr 1961	15 Sep 1966	31 Dec 2006
Sizewell B	1	PWR	WH SNUPPS	Operational	1191	18 Jul 1988	22 Sep 1995	(2055)
Sizewell C	1	PWR	EPR	Under construction	1600	(2025)		
Sizewell C	2	PWR	EPR	Under construction	1600	(2025)		
Torness	1	GCR	AGR	Operational	595	1 Aug 1980	25 May 1988	(2030)
Torness	2	GCR	AGR	Operational	595	1 Aug 1980	3 Feb 1989	(2030)
Trawsfynydd	1	GCR	Magnox	Shut down/in decommissioning	195	1 Jul 1959	24 Mar 1965	6 Feb 1991
Trawsfynydd	2	GCR	Magnox	Shut down/in decommissioning	195	1 Jul 1959	24 Mar 1965	4 Feb 1991
Winfrith	1	SGHWR	SGHWR	Shut down/in decommissioning	92	1 May 1963	1 Jan 1968	11 Sep 1990
Wylfa	1	GCR	Magnox	Shut down/in decommissioning	490	1 Sep 1963	1 Nov 1971	30 Dec 2015
Wylfa	2	GCR	Magnox	Shut down/in decommissioning	490	1 Sep 1963	3 Jan 1972	25 Apr 2012
Wylfa Newydd	1	ABWR	N/A	Cancelled	N/A	2014 (planned)	2020 (planned)	
Wylfa Newydd	2	ABWR	N/A	Cancelled	N/A	2014 (planned)	2020 (planned)	
Wylfa Newydd	3	PWR	Rolls-Royce SMR	Planned	470	(2026)	(mid-2030s)	
Wylfa Newydd	4	PWR	Rolls-Royce SMR	Planned	470	(2026)	(mid-2030s)	
Wylfa Newydd	5	PWR	Rolls-Royce SMR	Planned	470	(2026)	(mid-2030s)	

== United States ==
Plant name	Unit No.	Type	Model	Status	Capacity (MW)	Begin building	Commercial operation	Closed
Arkansas Nuclear One	1	PWR	B & W (DRY-Cont)	Operational	836	1 Oct 1968	21 May 1974	
Arkansas Nuclear One	2	PWR	CE (DRY)	Operational	988	6 Dec 1968	1 Sep 1978	
Beaver Valley	1	PWR	WH 3-loop (DRY)	Operational	908	26 Jun 1970	2 Jul 1976	
Beaver Valley	2	PWR	WH 3-loop (DRY)	Operational	905	3 May 1974	14 Aug 1987	
Big Rock Point	1	BWR	BWR-1	Dismantled	67	1 May 1960	29 Mar 1963	29 Aug 1997
Braidwood	1	PWR	WH 4-loop (DRY)	Operational	1194	1 Aug 1975	29 Jul 1988	
Braidwood	2	PWR	WH 4-loop (DRY)	Operational	1160	1 Aug 1975	17 Oct 1988	
Browns Ferry	1	BWR	BWR-4 (WET)	Operational	1200	1 May 1967	1 Aug 1974	
Browns Ferry	2	BWR	BWR-4 (WET)	Operational	1200	1 May 1967	1 Mar 1975	
Browns Ferry	3	BWR	BWR-4 (WET)	Operational	1210	1 Jul 1968	1 Mar 1977	
Brunswick	1	BWR	BWR-4 (WET)	Operational	938	7 Feb 1970	18 Mar 1977	
Brunswick	2	BWR	BWR-4 (WET)	Operational	932	7 Feb 1970	3 Nov 1975	
Byron	1	PWR	WH 4-loop (DRY)	Operational	1164	1 Apr 1975	16 Sep 1985	
Byron	2	PWR	WH 4-loop (DRY)	Operational	1136	1 Apr 1975	2 Aug 1987	
Callaway	1	PWR	WH 4-loop (DRY)	Operational	1215	1 Sep 1975	19 Dec 1984	
Calvert Cliffs	1	PWR	CE 2-loop (DRY)	Operational	877	1 Jun 1968	8 May 1977	
Calvert Cliffs	2	PWR	CE 2-loop (DRY)	Operational	855	1 Jun 1968	1 Apr 1977	
Carbon Free Power Project	1	PWR	US460	Cancelled	77			
Carbon Free Power Project	2	PWR	US460	Cancelled	77			
Carbon Free Power Project	3	PWR	US460	Cancelled	77			
Carbon Free Power Project	4	PWR	US460	Cancelled	77			
Carbon Free Power Project	5	PWR	US460	Cancelled	77			
Carbon Free Power Project	6	PWR	US460	Cancelled	77			
Catawba	1	PWR	WH 4-loop (ICECOND)	Operational	1160	1 May 1974	29 Jun 1985	
Catawba	2	PWR	WH 4-loop (ICECOND)	Operational	1150	1 May 1974	19 Aug 1986	
Clinch River	1	BWR	BWRX-300	Planned	300			
Clinton	1	BWR	BWR-6 (WET)	Operational	1062	1 Oct 1975	24 Nov 1987	
Columbia	1	BWR	BWR-5 (WET)	Operational	1131	1 Aug 1972	13 Dec 1984	
Comanche Peak	1	PWR	WH 4-loop (DRY)	Operational	1205	19 Dec 1974	13 Aug 1990	
Comanche Peak	2	PWR	WH 4-loop (DRY)	Operational	1195	19 Dec 1974	3 Aug 1993	
Connecticut Yankee	1	PWR	WH (DRY)	Dismantled	582	1 May 1964	1 Jan 1968	5 Dec 1996
Cooper	1	BWR	BWR-4 (WET)	Operational	769	1 Jun 1968	1 Jul 1974	
Crystal River 3	1	PWR	B & W (DRY)	Shut down/in decommissioning	860	25 Sep 1968	13 Mar 1977	5 Feb 2013
Davis–Besse	1	PWR	B & W (DRY)	Operational	894	1 Sep 1970	31 Jul 1978	
Diablo Canyon	1	PWR	WH 4-Loop (DRY)	Operational	1138	23 Apr 1968	7 May 1985	
Diablo Canyon	2	PWR	WH 4-Loop (DRY)	Operational	1118	9 Dec 1970	13 Mar 1986	
Donald C. Cook	1	PWR	WH 4-Loop (ICECOND)	Operational	1020	25 Mar 1969	27 Aug 1975	
Donald C. Cook	2	PWR	WH 4-Loop (ICECOND)	Operational	1090	25 Mar 1969	1 Jul 1978	
Dresden	1	BWR	BWR-1	Shut down	197	1 May 1956	4 Jul 1960	31 Oct 1978
Dresden	2	BWR	BWR-3 (WET)	Operational	894	10 Jan 1966	9 Jun 1970	
Dresden	3	BWR	BWR-3 (WET)	Operational	879	14 Oct 1966	16 Nov 1971	
Duane Arnold	1	BWR	BWR-4 (WET)	Restart in progress	601	22 May 1970	1 Feb 1975	10 Aug 2020
Edwin I. Hatch	1	BWR	BWR-4 (WET)	Operational	924	30 Sep 1968	31 Dec 1975	
Edwin I. Hatch	2	BWR	BWR-4 (WET)	Operational	924	1 Feb 1972	5 Sep 1979	
Elk River	1	BWR		Dismantled	22	1 Jan 1959	1 Jul 1964	1 Feb 1968
Fermi	1	FBR	Prototype	Shut down	61	8 Aug 1956	7 Aug 1966	29 Nov 1972
Fermi	2	BWR	BWR-4 (WET)	Operational	1115	26 Sep 1972	23 Jan 1988	
Fermi America	1	PWR	AP1000	Planned	1117	(2026)		
Fermi America	2	PWR	AP1000	Planned	1117			
Fermi America	3	PWR	AP1000	Planned	1117			
Fermi America	4	PWR	AP1000	Planned	1117			
Fort Calhoun	1	PWR	CE 2-loop (WET)	Shut down	482	7 Jun 1968	9 Aug 1973	24 Oct 2016
Fort St. Vrain	1	HTGR	General Atomics	Shut down	330	1 Sep 1968	1 Jul 1979	29 Aug 1989
Ginna	1	PWR	WH 2-loop (DRY)	Operational	560	25 Apr 1966	1 Jun 1970	
Grand Gulf	1	BWR	BWR-6 (WET)	Operational	1401	4 May 1974	1 Jul 1985	
H. B. Robinson	1	PWR	WH 3-loop (DRY)	Operational	735	13 Apr 1967	7 Mar 1971	
Hallam	1	SGR	Atomics International	Dismantled	75	1 Jan 1959	1 Nov 1963	1 Sep 1969
Hartsville	A1	BWR	BWR-6	Unfinished	1285	23 May 1975		29 Aug 1984
Hartsville	A2	BWR	BWR-6	Unfinished	1285	23 May 1975		29 Aug 1984
Hartsville	B1	BWR	BWR-6	Unfinished	1285	23 May 1975		22 Mar 1983
Hartsville	B2	BWR	BWR-6	Unfinished	1285	23 May 1975		22 Mar 1983
Hope Creek	1	BWR	BWR-4 (WET)	Operational	1172	1 Mar 1976	20 Dec 1986	
Humboldt Bay	1	BWR	BWR-1	Dismantled	63	1 Nov 1960	1 Aug 1963	2 Jul 1976
Indian Point	1	PWR		Shut down	257	1 May 1956	1 Oct 1962	31 Oct 1974
Indian Point	2	PWR	WH 4-loop (DRY)	Shut down	998	14 Oct 1966	1 Aug 1974	30 Apr 2020
Indian Point	3	PWR	WH 4-loop (DRY)	Shut down	1030	1 Nov 1968	30 Aug 1976	30 Apr 2021
James A. FitzPatrick	1	BWR	BWR-4 (WET)	Operational	813	1 Sep 1968	28 Jul 1975	
Joseph M. Farley	1	PWR	WH 3-Loop (DRY)	Operational	874	1 Oct 1970	1 Dec 1977	
Joseph M. Farley	2	PWR	WH 3-Loop (DRY)	Operational	883	1 Oct 1970	30 Jul 1981	
Kemmerer	1	SFR	Natrium	Under construction	345	10 Jun 2024		
Kewaunee	1	PWR	WH 2-loop (DRY)	Shut down	566	6 Aug 1968	16 Jun 1974	7 May 2013
La Crosse	1	BWR	BWR-1	Dismantled	48	1 Mar 1963	7 Nov 1969	30 Apr 1987
LaSalle County	1	BWR	BWR-5 (WET)	Operational	1137	10 Sep 1973	1 Jan 1984	
LaSalle County	2	BWR	BWR-5 (WET)	Operational	1140	10 Sep 1973	19 Oct 1984	
Limerick	1	BWR	BWR-5 (WET)	Operational	1134	19 Jun 1974	1 Feb 1986	
Limerick	2	BWR	BWR-5 (WET)	Operational	1134	19 Jun 1974	8 Jan 1990	
Long Mott	1	HTGR	Xe-100	Planned	80			
Long Mott	2	HTGR	Xe-100	Planned	80			
Long Mott	3	HTGR	Xe-100	Planned	80			
Long Mott	4	HTGR	Xe-100	Planned	80			
Maine Yankee	1	PWR	CE (DRY)	Dismantled	860	1 Oct 1968	28 Dec 1972	1 Aug 1997
Marble Hill	1	PWR	WH (DRY)	Unfinished	1130	1 Aug 1977		10 Jan 1984
McGuire	1	PWR	WH 4-Loop (ICECOND)	Operational	1158	1 Apr 1971	1 Dec 1981	
McGuire	2	PWR	WH 4-Loop (ICECOND)	Operational	1158	1 Apr 1971	1 Mar 1984	
Millstone	1	BWR	BWR-3 (WET)	Shut down	641	1 May 1966	28 Dec 1970	21 Jul 1998
Millstone	2	PWR	CE 2-loop (DRY)	Operational	869	1 Nov 1969	26 Dec 1975	
Millstone	3	PWR	WH 4-Loop (DRY)	Operational	1210	9 Aug 1974	23 Apr 1986	
Monticello	1	BWR	BWR-3 (WET)	Operational	628	19 Jun 1967	30 Jun 1971	
Nine Mile Point	1	BWR	BWR-2 (WET)	Operational	613	12 Apr 1965	1 Dec 1969	
Nine Mile Point	2	BWR	BWR-5 (WET)	Operational	1277	1 Aug 1975	11 Mar 1988	
North Anna	1	PWR	WH 3-Loop (DRY)	Operational	948	19 Feb 1971	6 Jun 1978	
North Anna	2	PWR	WH 3-Loop (DRY)	Operational	944	19 Feb 1971	14 Dec 1980	
Oconee	1	PWR	B & W (DRY)	Operational	847	6 Nov 1967	15 Jul 1973	
Oconee	2	PWR	B & W (DRY)	Operational	848	6 Nov 1967	9 Sep 1974	
Oconee	3	PWR	B & W (DRY)	Operational	859	6 Nov 1967	16 Dec 1974	
Oyster Creek	1	BWR	BWR-2 (WET)	Shut down	619	15 Dec 1964	23 Dec 1969	17 Sep 2018
Palisades	1	PWR	CE 2-loop (DRY)	Restart in progress	805	14 Mar 1967	31 Dec 1971	20 May 2022
Palisades	2	PWR	SMR-300	Planned	340			
Palisades	3	PWR	SMR-300	Planned	340			
Palo Verde	1	PWR	CE80 2-loop (DRY)	Operational	1311	25 May 1976	28 Jan 1986	
Palo Verde	2	PWR	CE80 2-loop (DRY)	Operational	1314	1 Jun 1976	19 Sep 1986	
Palo Verde	3	PWR	CE80 2-loop (DRY)	Operational	1312	1 Jun 1976	8 Jan 1988	
Parr	1	PHWR	CVTR	Dismantled	17	1 Jan 1960	18 Dec 1963	10 Jan 1967
Pathfinder	1	BWR	BWR-1	Dismantled	59	1 Jan 1959	1 Aug 1966	1 Oct 1967
Peach Bottom	1	GCR	Prototype	Shut down	40	1 Feb 1962	1 Jun 1966	1 Nov 1974
Peach Bottom	2	BWR	BWR-4 (WET)	Operational	1300	31 Jan 1968	5 Jul 1974	
Peach Bottom	3	BWR	BWR-4 (WET)	Operational	1331	31 Jan 1968	23 Dec 1974	
Perry	1	BWR	BWR-6 (WET)	Operational	1240	1 Oct 1974	18 Nov 1987	
Phipps Bend	1	BWR	BWR-6	Unfinished	1233	10 Nov 1977		6 Aug 1981
Phipps Bend	2	BWR	BWR-6	Unfinished	1233	10 Nov 1977		6 Aug 1981
Pilgrim	1	BWR	BWR-3 (WET)	Shut down	677	26 Aug 1968	9 Dec 1972	31 May 2019
Piqua	1	OCR	Atomics International	Decommissioned	12	1 Jan 1960	1 Nov 1963	1 Jan 1966
Point Beach	1	PWR	WH 2-loop (DRY)	Operational	591	19 Jul 1967	21 Dec 1970	
Point Beach	2	PWR	WH 2-loop (DRY)	Operational	591	25 Jul 1968	1 Oct 1972	
Prairie Island	1	PWR	WH 2-loop (DRY)	Operational	522	25 Jun 1968	16 Dec 1973	
Prairie Island	2	PWR	WH 2-loop (DRY)	Operational	519	25 Jun 1969	21 Dec 1974	
Quad Cities	1	BWR	BWR-4 (WET)	Operational	908	15 Feb 1967	18 Feb 1973	
Quad Cities	2	BWR	BWR-4 (WET)	Operational	911	15 Feb 1967	10 Mar 1973	
Rancho Seco	1	PWR	WH (DRY)	Decommissioned	873	1 Apr 1969	17 Apr 1975	23 Jun 1989
River Bend	1	BWR	BWR-6 (WET)	Operational	967	25 Mar 1977	16 Jun 1986	
Salem	1	PWR	WH 4-loop (DRY)	Operational	1169	25 Sep 1968	30 Jun 1977	
Salem	2	PWR	WH 4-loop (DRY)	Operational	1158	25 Sep 1968	31 Oct 1981	
San Onofre	1	PWR	WH (DRY)	Dismantled	436	16 Jul 1964	1 Jan 1968	30 Nov 1992
San Onofre	2	PWR	CE (DRY)	Shut down/in decommissioning	1070	1 Mar 1974	8 Aug 1983	7 Jun 2013
San Onofre	3	PWR	CE (DRY)	Shut down/in decommissioning	1180	1 Mar 1974	1 Apr 1984	7 Jun 2013
Saxton	1	PWR		Decommissioned	3	1 Jan 1960	Nov 1961	May 1972
Seabrook	1	PWR	WH 4-Loop (DRY)	Operational	1246	7 Jul 1976	15 Mar 1990	
Sequoyah	1	PWR	WH 4-Loop (ICECOND)	Operational	1152	27 May 1970	1 Jul 1981	
Sequoyah	2	PWR	WH 4-Loop (ICECOND)	Operational	1139	27 May 1970	1 Jun 1982	
Shearon Harris	1	PWR	WH 3-Loop (DRY)	Operational	964	28 Jan 1978	2 May 1987	
Shippingport	1	PWR	WH	Dismantled	60	6 Sep 1954	26 May 1958	Dec 1989
Shoreham	1	BWR	GE	Shut down	820	1 Nov 1972	1 Aug 1986	1 May 1989
SRE	1	SGR		Decommissioned	6.5	1954	12 Jul 1957	15 Feb 1964
South Texas	1	PWR	WH 4-loop (DRY)	Operational	1280	22 Dec 1975	25 Aug 1988	
South Texas	2	PWR	WH 4-loop (DRY)	Operational	1280	22 Dec 1975	19 Jun 1989	
St. Lucie	1	PWR	CE (DRY)	Operational	981	1 Jul 1970	1 Mar 1976	
St. Lucie	2	PWR	CE (DRY)	Operational	987	2 Jun 1977	10 Jun 1983	
Surry	1	PWR	WH 3-loop (DRY)	Operational	838	25 Jun 1968	22 Dec 1972	
Surry	2	PWR	WH 3-loop (DRY)	Operational	838	25 Jun 1968	1 May 1973	
Susquehanna	1	BWR	BWR-5 (WET)	Operational	1257	2 Nov 1973	12 Nov 1982	
Susquehanna	2	BWR	BWR-5 (WET)	Operational	1257	2 Nov 1973	27 Jun 1984	
Three Mile Island	1	PWR	B & W (DRY)	Restart in progress	819	18 May 1968	2 Sep 1974	20 Sep 2019
Three Mile Island	2	PWR	B & W (DRY)	Core melt	880	1 Nov 1969	30 Dec 1978	28 Mar 1979
Trojan	1	PWR	WH (DRY)	Dismantled	1095	1 Feb 1970	20 May 1976	9 Nov 1992
Turkey Point	3	PWR	WH 3-Loop (DRY)	Operational	829	27 Apr 1967	14 Dec 1972	
Turkey Point	4	PWR	WH 3-Loop (DRY)	Operational	821	27 Apr 1967	7 Sep 1973	
Vallecitos	1	BWR	BWR-1	Shut down	25	1 Jan 1956	19 Oct 1957	9 Dec 1963
Vermont Yankee	1	BWR	BWR-4 (WET)	Shut down	605	11 Dec 1967	30 Nov 1972	29 Dec 2014
Virgil C. Summer	1	PWR	WH 3-Loop (DRY)	Operational	973	21 Mar 1973	1 Jan 1984	
Virgil C. Summer	2	PWR	AP1000	Unfinished; restart planned	1117	9 Mar 2013		
Virgil C. Summer	3	PWR	AP1000	Unfinished; restart planned	1117	2 Nov 2013		
Vogtle	1	PWR	WH 4-Loop (DRY)	Operational	1150	1 Aug 1976	1 Jun 1987	
Vogtle	2	PWR	WH 4-Loop (DRY)	Operational	1152	1 Aug 1976	20 May 1989	
Vogtle	3	PWR	AP1000	Operational	1117	12 Mar 2013	31 Jul 2023	
Vogtle	4	PWR	AP1000	Operational	1117	19 Nov 2013	29 April 2024	
Waterford	1	PWR	CE 2-loop (DRY)	Operational	1168	14 Nov 1974	24 Sep 1985	
Watts Bar	1	PWR	WH 4-Loop (ICECOND)	Operational	1157	20 Jul 1973	27 May 1996	
Watts Bar	2	PWR	WH 4-Loop (ICECOND)	Operational	1164	1 Sep 1973	4 Jun 2016	
Wolf Creek	1	PWR	WH 4-Loop (DRY)	Operational	1200	31 May 1977	3 Sep 1985	
Yankee Rowe	1	PWR	WH (DRY)	Dismantled	167	1 Nov 1957	1 Jul 1961	1 Oct 1991
Zion	1	PWR	WH (DRY)	Dismantled	1040	1 Dec 1968	31 Dec 1973	13 Feb 1998
Zion	2	PWR	WH (DRY)	Dismantled	1040	1 Dec 1968	17 Sep 1974	13 Feb 1998

== Uzbekistan ==
Plant name	Unit No.	Type	Model	Status	Capacity (MW)	Begin building	Commercial operation	Closed
Plant in the Jizzakh Region	1	PWR	RITM-200N	Under construction	55	24 Mar 2026		
Plant in the Jizzakh Region	2	PWR	RITM-200N	Under construction	55	24 Mar 2026		
Plant in the Jizzakh Region	3	PWR	VVER-1000	Planned	930			
Plant in the Jizzakh Region	4	PWR	VVER-1000	Planned	930			

== See also ==
- Economics of nuclear power plants
- Integrated Nuclear Fuel Cycle Information System
- List of nuclear power stations
- List of boiling water reactors
- List of largest power stations
- List of small modular reactor designs
- List of nuclear reprocessing sites
- Lists of nuclear disasters and radioactive incidents
- Nuclear power by country
- Nuclear power reactors in Europe
