= List of nuclear reprocessing plants =

Note: tHM = ton of heavy metal.

== Belgium ==
List of Belgium Reprocessing Sites
Name	Location	Fuel type	Procedure	Status	Reprocessing capacity (tHM/yr)	Construction start date	Operation date	Closure	Purpose
Mol	Mol	LWR, MTR (Material Test Reactor)		Shut down	80		1966	1974	Civil

== China ==
List of Chinese Reprocessing Sites
Name	Location	Fuel type	Procedure	Status	Reprocessing capacity (tHM/yr)	Construction start date	Operation date	Closure	Purpose
Intermediate Pilot Plant				Shut down	60-100		1968	1970-1979	
Plant 404				Operational	50		2004		

== France ==
List of French Reprocessing Sites
Name	Location	Fuel type	Procedure	Status	Reprocessing capacity (tHM/yr)	Construction start date	Operation date	Closure	Purpose
UP-1	Marcoule			Shut down	0.001		1958	1997	Military
CEA APM	Marcoule	Fast Breeder	PUREX, DIAMEX, SANEX	Operational	6		1988		Civil
UP-2	La Hague	LWR	PUREX	Shut down	900		1967	1974	Civil
UP-2-400	La Hague	LWR	PUREX	Shut down	400		1976	1990	Civil
UP-2-800	La Hague	LWR	PUREX	Operational	800		1990		Civil
UP-3	La Hague	LWR	PUREX	Operational	800		1990		Civil

== Germany ==
List of German Reprocessing Sites
Name	Location	Fuel type	Procedure	Status	Reprocessing capacity (tHM/yr)	Construction start date	Operation date	Closure	Purpose
Karlsruhe, WAK		Light Water Reactor		Shut down	35		1971	1990	Civil

== Italy ==
List of Italian Reprocessing Facilities
Name	Location	Fuel type	Procedure	Status	Reprocessing capacity (tHM/yr)	Construction start date	Operation date	Closure	Purpose
Rotondella	Rotondella	Thorium		Shut down	5			1968	

== India ==
List of Indian Reprocessing Facilities
Name	Location	Fuel type	Procedure	Status	Reprocessing capacity (tHM/yr)	Construction start date	Operation date	Closure	Purpose
Trombay			PUREX	Operational	60		1965		Military
Tarapur		PHWR	PUREX	Operational	100		1982		Civil
Kalpakam		PHWR, FBTR	PUREX	Operational	100		1998		Civil
Tarapur		PHWR	PUREX	Operational	100		2011		Civil

== Israel ==
List of Israeli Reprocessing Facilities
Name	Location	Fuel type	Procedure	Status	Reprocessing capacity (tHM/yr)	Construction start date	Operation date	Closure	Purpose
Dimona				Shut down	60-100		1960		Military

== Japan ==
List of Japanese Reprocessing Plants
Name	Location	Fuel type	Procedure	Status	Reprocessing capacity (tHM/yr)	Construction start date	Operation date	Closure	Purpose
Tokaimura		LWR		Shut down	210		1977	2006	Civil
Rokkasho		LWR		Under construction	800	1998	(2024)		Civil

== Pakistan ==
List of Pakistan Reprocessing Plants
Name	Location	Fuel type	Procedure	Status	Reprocessing capacity (tHM/yr)	Construction start date	Operation date	Closure	Purpose
New Labs	Rawalpindi	Plutonium/Thorium		Operational	80		1982		Military
Khushab Nuclear Complex	Atomic City of Pakistan	Tritium		Operational	0.022		1986		Military

== Russia ==
List of Russian Reprocessing Plants
Name	Location	Fuel type	Procedure	Status	Reprocessing capacity (tHM/yr)	Construction start date	Operation date	Closure	Purpose
Plant B	Mayak			Shut down	400		1948	1960's	Military
Plant BBRT-1	Mayak	LWR	PUREX	Operational	400		1978		Civil
Tomsk-7 Radiochemical	Tomsk			Shut down	6000		1956		Military
Krasnoyarsk-26	Zheleznogorsk			Shut down	3500		1964	2010	Military
RT-2	Zheleznogorsk	VVER	PUREX	Under construction	800		(2030)		Civil

== United Kingdom ==
List of UK Reprocessing Sites
Name	Location	Fuel type	Procedure	Status	Reprocessing capacity (tHM/yr)	Construction start date	Operation date	Closure	Purpose
B204	Sellafield	Magnox	BUTEX	Shut down	750		1956	1970s	
B205	Sellafield	Magnox	PUREX	Shut down	1500		1964	2022	
THORP	Sellafield	AGR, LWR	PUREX	Shut down	900		1994	2018	
Dounreay	Dounreay	Fast Breeder		Shut down	8			1980	

== United States ==
List of US Reprocessing Plants
Name	Location	Fuel type	Procedure	Status	Reprocessing capacity (tHM/yr)	Construction start date	Operation date	Closure	Purpose
Hanford Site	Washington		REDOX, PUREX	Shut down			1944	1988	Military
Savannah River Site	South Carolina	LWR	PUREX	Shut down	5000		1952	2002	Civil
West Valley		LWR	PUREX	Shut down	300		1966	1972	Civil
Barnwell		LWR		Finished; never entered service	1500				
INL		LWR		Shut down					
Morris Operation	Morris, Illinois			Construction halted; never entered service, completion proposed 2013					
