= Hydropower in the Mekong River Basin =

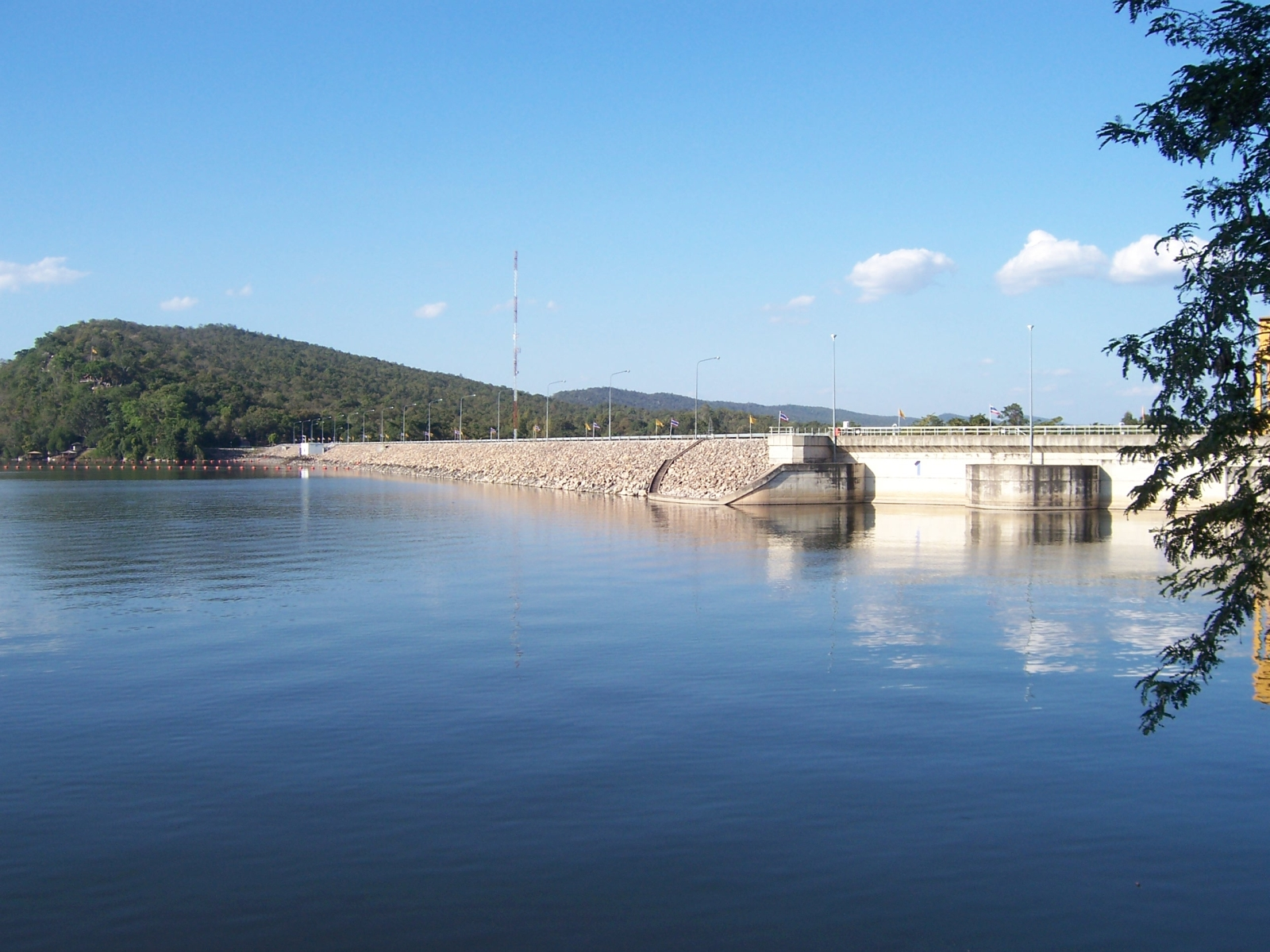
Ubol Ratana Dam in Thailand

The estimated hydropower potential of Mekong River Basin about 58,930 Megawatts (MW). As of February 2024, there are an estimated 167 Hydropower Plants (HPPs) in the Mekong, with a combined installed capacity of some 36,376.3 MW. An additional 20 HPPs are currently under construction and at various stages of completion. These have a combined installed capacity of an additional 4,535.5 MW.

The single most significant impact on the use of water and its management in the Mekong Region is hydropower. These developments in the Mekong River Basin have resulted in substantial environmental and social impacts, which are summarised below. These have fuelled controversy and hydropower is a prominent part of the discussion around the river, its basin, and its management. This debate occurs in both the academic literature, as well as the media, and is a focus for many activist groups.

The countries that share the Mekong River Basin have all sought the large-scale infrastructural development of its waters. As part of China's Great Western Development program, large-scale hydropower development in China's Yunnan Province has been substantial, on the Mekong, the Jinsha, and the Red rivers. Large amounts of Yunnan's hydropower is exported eastwards to energy intensive load centres, such as Guangxi and Guangdong. Yunnan, however, has large electricity over-supply problems, which has led to significant hydropower curtailment.

The Lao government has also prioritized hydropower development, primarily as an export commodity. In 2021, almost 82% of Lao electricity was exported, mostly to Thailand. Power production (from all sources, including hydropower) contributed 12.8% to national GDP in 2022, while electricity exports comprised almost 29% of total export values in the same year, and investments in electricity production represented 79% of total foreign direct investment in 2021.

Most of Cambodia's hydropower has been developed in the southwest of the country, outside of the Mekong River Basin. Its largest HPP, the Lower Sesan 2 is, however, within the Mekong River Basin, and generates some 20% of the country's electricity. Cambodia has ruled out developing hydropower on the Mekong mainstream, but multiple dams are planned for construction in Mekong tributary catchments. Cambodia also exports electricity directly from the Don Sahong HPP, a southern Lao dam located on the Mekong mainstream.

In Thailand, little technically exploitable hydropower potential remains in its parts of the Mekong River Basin. Most of its HPPs were developed in the 1980s and 1990s, and accompanied by large-scale irrigation infrastructure development as part of the massive Kong-Chi-Mun Project, more recently rearticulated as the Khong-Loei-Chi-Mun Project Large-scale energy infrastructure in Thailand has been met with strong resistance - for example, the Assembly of the Poor's opposition to the Pak Mun HPP, the last dam to be commissioned in Thailand. This has forced Thailand to export the social and environmental externalities of hydropower construction and operation to neighbouring states.

While there are multiple HPPs planned for Myanmar parts of the Mekong River Basin, years of political instability have generally impended hydropower development.

Vietnam's Mekong hydropower development is concentrated in its Central Highlands. It does not appear as if any technically-exploitable hydropower potential remains. Here, hydropower has also been accompanied by significant irrigation development. Vietnam's hydropower investments in this area includes sizeable dams on two key Mekong tributaries, the Sesan and the Srepok rivers.

== Mekong mainstream hydropower plants ==
HPPs on the Mekong mainstream have aroused particular environmental concerns. The majority of these are based in China's Yunnan Province. Table 1 below indicates the status of each of these HPPs.

Table 1: Hydropower plants on the Mekong mainstream

Project	Country	Location	COD	Installed capacity (MW)	Status
Sambor	(Cambodia)	12.786849°N 105.938582°E	N/A	2,600	Cancelled
Stung Treng	(Cambodia)	13.575317°N 105.98345°E	N/A	980	Cancelled
Angsai	(China)	32.466805°N 95.394246°E	?	55	Planned
Baita	(China)	28.980898°N 98.626669°E	?	?	Planned
Banda	(China)	30.2°N 97.93365°E	?	1,000	Planned
Bangduo	(China)	29.469708°N 98.394729°E	?	720	Planned
Dachaoshan	(China)	24.024947°N 100.3703°E	2003	1,350	Commissioned
Dahuaqiao	(China)	26.308096°N 99.139288°E	2018	920	Commissioned
Dongzhong	(China)	31.872777°N 96.99°E	?	108	Planned
Ganlanba	(China)	21.843867°N 100.937917°E	?	155	Planned
Gongguoqiao	(China)	25.585917°N 99.335567°E	2012	900	Commissioned
Guoduo	(China)	31.529089°N 97.191279°E	2015	160	Commissioned
Guonian	(China)	28.319211°N 98.868424°E	N/A	1,200	Cancelled
Gushui	(China)	28.608683°N 98.746133°E	?	2,600	Planned
Huangdeng	(China)	26.548199°N 99.112669°E	2017	1,900	Commissioned
Jinghong	(China)	22.053206°N 100.766478°E	2009	1,750	Commissioned
Lidi	(China)	27.848016°N 99.030555°E	2019	420	Commissioned
Lin Chang	(China)	31.1804°N 97.1852°E	?	72	Planned
Longqingxia	(China)	32.884167°N 95.350283°E	2006	2.5	Commissioned
Manwan	(China)	24.622086°N 100.448544°E	1995	1,570	Commissioned
Mengsong	(China)	21.780267°N 101.147367°E	N/A	600	Cancelled
Miaowei	(China)	25.854121°N 99.163155°E	2017	1,400	Commissioned
Nuozhadu	(China)	22.642128°N 100.436336°E	2014	5,850	Commissioned
Quzika	(China)	30.039854°N 97.889503°E	?	405	Planned
Ru Mei	(China)	29.649933°N 98.3477°E	?	2,100	Planned
Sidige	(China)	30.985°N 97.339°E	?	129	Planned
Tuoba	(China)	27.194231°N 99.107516°E	2024	1,400	Commissioned
Wunonglong	(China)	27.932554°N 98.9333°E	2018	990	Commissioned
Xiaowan	(China)	24.7042226°N 100.091255°E	2010	4,200	Commissioned
Yue Long	(China)	30.868008°N 97.347124°E	2030	100	Planned
Ban Koum	(Laos)	15.417881°N 105.587364°E	2030	1,872	Planned
Don Sahong	(Laos)	13.956223°N 105.964247°E	2020	240	Commissioned
Luang Prabang	(Laos)	20.06663°N 102.192339°E	2030	1,460	Under construction
Pak Chom	(Laos)	18.201038°N 102.050588°E	?	1,079	Planned
Pak Beng	(Laos)	19.849455°N 101.019507°E	2033	912	Planned
Pak Lay	(Laos)	18.401361°N 101.58362°E	2029	728	Planned
Phoug Noi	(Laos)	15.050186°N 105.848498°E	2029	728	Planned
Sanakham	(Laos)	17.829183°N 101.556969°E	2028	684	Planned. As of Q4 2024, "the government [is being urged] to delay the public hearing process", according to media.
Thako	(Laos)	13.959072°N 105.988047°E	N/A	86-172	Cancelled
Xayaburi	(Laos)	19.254006°N 101.813699°E	2019	1,285	Commissioned

Notes: COD = Commercial Operating Date; N/A = Not Applicable

== Existing hydropower infrastructure in the Mekong River Basin ==
Table 2: Commissioned dams in the Mekong River Basin (15 MW installed capacity and above)

Project	Country	River	Location	COD	Installed capacity (MW)	Mean Annual Energy (GWh)	Height (m)	Crest length (m)	Total storage (million m^{3})	Max reservoir area (km^{2})
Lower Sesan 2	(Cambodia)	Sesan	13.551408°N 106.263841°E	2018	400	2,312	45	7,729	1,790	335
Dachaoshan	(China)	Mekong	24.024947°N 100.3703°E	2003	1,350	5,500	115	481	890	26.25
Dahuaqiao	(China)	Mekong	26.308096°N 99.139288°E	2018	920	4,070	106	231.5	293	
Ganlanba	(China)	Mekong	21.843867°N 100.937917°E	2015	155	1,177	60.5	458	577	58
Gongguoqiao	(China)	Mekong	25.585917°N 99.335567°E	2012	900	4,041	105	356	316	343
Guoduo	(China)	Mekong	31.529089°N 97.191279°E	2015	160	823	93	235.5	83	
Huangdeng	(China)	Mekong	26.548199°N 99.112669°E	2017	1,900	8,578	203	457	1,613	
Jinfeng	(China)	Nan La He	21.592026°N 101.225135°E	1998	16	64.3	45		19.48	
Jinghong	(China)	Mekong	22.053206°N 100.766478°E	2009	1,750	5,570	108	705.5	1,140	510
Jinhe	(China)	Jin He	30.806181°N 97.332926°E	2004	60	367	34	68.4	4.27	
Laoyinyan	(China)	Gua Lan Zi He/Shun Dian He	24.469128°N 99.81754°E	1997	16		4.2		1,092	
Lidi	(China)	Mekong	27.848016°N 99.030555°E	2019	420	1,753	75	346.4	75	3.7
Luozhahe 1	(China)	Luo Zha He	24.505207°N 100.451749°E	2018	30	135	59		14.33	
Luozhahe 2	(China)	Luo Zha He	24.486867°N 100.402128°E	2016{	50	225	71		3,391	
Manwan	(China)	Mekong	24.622086°N 100.448544°E	1995	1,570	6,710	132	418	920	415
Miaowei	(China)	Mekong	25.854121°N 99.163155°E	2017	1,400	5,999	140		660	
Nanhe 1	(China)	Luo Zha He	24.342442°N 100.012183°E	2009	40	170	56.8	148	11.36	
Nanhe 2	(China)	Luo Zha He	24.377086°N 100.050098°E	?	25	100				
Nuozhadu	(China)	Mekong	22.642128°N 100.436336°E	2014	5,850	23,912	262	608	23,703	320
Tuoba	(China)	Mekong	27.194231°N 99.107516°E	2024	1,400	Commissioned				
Wunonglong	(China)	Mekong	27.932554°N 98.9333°E	2018	990	4,116	138	247	284	
Xiaowan	(China)	Mekong	24.7042226°N 100.091255°E	2010	4,200	18,990	295	893	14,560	194
Xi'er He 1	(China)	Xi'er He	25.578801°N 100.202419°E	1979	105	440				
Xi'er He 2	(China)	Xi'er He	25.561991°N 100.131191°E	1987	50		37	122	0.2	
Xi'er He 3	(China)	Xi'er He	25.558584°N 100.107878°E	1988	50	223	21			
Xi'er He 4	(China)	Xi'er He	25.576262°N 100.065574°E	1971	50				14	
XunCun	(China)	Hei Hui Jiang	25.421835°N 99.993301°E	1999	78	345	67	165	74	
Mong Wa	(Myanmar)	Nam Lwe	21.396967°N 100.32584°E	2017	66	330.45	51		78	8.01
Don Sahong	(Laos)	Mekong	13.956223°N 105.964247°E	2020	240	2,000	25	6,800	25	2.2
Houay Ho	(Laos)	Houayho/Xekong	15.059464°N 106.764377°E	1999	152	450	79		3,530	37
Houay La Nge	(Laos)	Houay La-Nge	15.774865°N 107.054896°E	2023	60	290	58	179	14	93.6
Houay Lamphan Gnai	(Laos)	Xekong	15.356495°N 106.498949°E	2015	84.8	480	77	74.5	140	9
Houay Por	(Laos)	Houay Por	15.545605°N 106.256763°E	2018	15	75	6		0.76	
Lower Houay Lam Phanh	(Laos)	Houay Lamphan	15.321515°N 106.630123°E	2022	15	68	55	523	73.9	
Nam Ao	(Laos)	Nam Ao	19.160876°N 103.283107°E	2023	15	92	26	130	52	4.9
Nam Beng	(Laos)	Nam Beng	19.946436°N 101.237563°E	2014	36	145	25.5	84.8	3,611	0.7
Nam Che 1	(Laos)	Nam Che	19.054645°N 103.513536°E	2019	16.8		23	50		
Nam Chien 1	(Laos)	Nam Che	19.145395°N 103.557259°E	2018	104	448.2	68.8	367	14	
Nam Houng 1	(Laos)	Nam Houng	19.189914°N 101.806322°E	2023	15	57				1.52
Nam Khan 2	(Laos)	Nam Khan	19.685364°N 102.369791°E	2015	130	558	160	405		30.5
Nam Khan 3	(Laos)	Nam Khan	19.747016°N 102.222793°E	2016	88	480	77	74.5	140	9
Nam Kong 1	(Laos)	Nam Kong	14.546513°N 106.740933°E	2021	160	649	87	386	679	21.8
Nam Kong 2	(Laos)	Nam Kong	14.494672°N 106.856669°E	2018	66	264	50	210	71.4	4.2
Nam Kong 3	(Laos)	Nam Kong	14.566338°N 106.912551°E	2021	54	204	65	500	471	32
Nam Leuk	(Laos)	Nam Leuk/Nam Ngum	18.437406°N 102.94675°E	2000	60	215	51.5	800	185	17.2
Nam Lik 1	(Laos)	Nam Lik	18.619438°N 102.387252°E	2019	64	256	36.5	72		22.3
Nam Lik 1-2	(Laos)	Nam Lik	18.793782°N 102.116714°E	2010	100	435	103	328	11	24.4
Nam Mang 1	(Laos)	Nam Mang	18.53423°N 103.196286°E	2016	64	225	70	280	16.5	0.148
Nam Mang 3	(Laos)	Nam Gnogn	18.349383°N 102.765244°E	2004	40	150	28	151	49	10
Nam Ngiep 1	(Laos)	Nam Ngiep	18.645828°N 103.552329°E	2019	272	1,546	167	530	1,192	67
Nam Ngiep 1 (DS)	(Laos)	Nam Ngiep	18.647966°N 103.571591°E	2019	18	105	20	90	4.6	1.27
Nam Ngiep 2	(Laos)	Nam Ngiep	19.243328°N 103.283818°E	2015	180	732	70.5		163	
Nam Ngiep 2B	(Laos)	Nam Ngiep	19.155918°N 103.346031°E	2015	18	76				
Nam Ngiep 3A	(Laos)	Nam Ngiep	19.243546°N 103.283913°E	2014	44	144	30	110	13.85	1.8
Nam Ngum 1	(Laos)	Nam Ngum	18.531068°N 102.547577°E	1971	315	1,455	70	468	4,700	370
Nam Ngum 2	(Laos)	Nam Ngum	18.755374°N 102.776476°E	2011	615	2,300	181.5	421	3,590	122.2
Nam Ngum 5	(Laos)	Nam Ngum	19.356095°N 102.621196°E	2012	120	507	104.5	258	314	14.6
Nam Ou 1	(Laos)	Nam Ou	20.0883°N 102.265379°E	2019	160	710	65	442	89.1	9.56
Nam Ou 2	(Laos)	Nam Ou	20.411698°N 102.472817°E	2016	120	546	55	352	121.7	15.7
Nam Ou 3	(Laos)	Nam Ou	20.695251°N 102.665404°E	2020	150	685	72	340	168.6	13.26
Nam Ou 4	(Laos)	Nam Ou	21.120153°N 102.494173°E	2020	116	524	47	300	124	9.37
Nam Ou 5	(Laos)	Nam Ou	21.411349°N 102.344263°E	2016	240	1,049	74		335	17.22
Nam Ou 6	(Laos)	Nam Ou	21.411349°N 102.344263°E	2016	180	739	88		409	17.01
Nam Ou 7	(Laos)	Nam Ou	22.07779°N 102.264436°E	2020	190	811	147	825	1,494	38.16
Nam Pha Gnai	(Laos)	Nam Pha Gnai	19.013318°N 102.264436°E	2016	19.2	130	65	148		1.5
Nam Phay	(Laos)	Nam Phay	19.109357°N 102.757461°E	2018	86	419.5				18.92
Nam San 3A	(Laos)	Nam San	19.129193°N 103.661752°E	2016	69	278.4	75	350	123	8.5
Nam San 3B	(Laos)	Nam San	19.085633°N 103.619938°E	2015	45	198				
Nam Tha 1	(Laos)	Nam Tha	20.249467°N 100.892433°E	2018	168	759.4	93.7	349.2	1,755	113.9
Nam Tha Had Muak	(Laos)	Nam Tha	20.24264°N 100.712302°E	2022	37.5	102.67				
Nam Theun 1	(Laos)	Nam Theun	18.356733°N 104.148017°E	2022	650	2,561	177	771	2,772	93.6
Nam Theun 2	(Laos)	Nam Theun/Xe Bangfai	17.997353°N 104.952306°E	2010	1,075	5,936	48	325	3,500	450
Theun-Hinboun	(Laos)	Nam Theun	18.261005°N 104.562525°E	1998	220	1,645	48	810	1,300	49
Theun-Hinboun Expansion Project	(Laos)	Nam Gnouang	18.297248°N 104.636171°E	2013	222	1,395	65	480	2,450	49
Xayaburi	(Laos)	Mekong	19.254006°N 101.813699°E	2019	1,285	6,035	48	810	1,300	49
Xe Kaman 1	(Laos)	Xe Kaman	14.960724°N 107.156336°E	2018	290	1,096	120	185	4,804	149.8
Xe Kaman 3	(Laos)	Xe Kaman	15.425194°N 107.362611°E	2014	250	1,000	102	543	141.5	5.2
Xe Kaman-Sanxay	(Laos)	Xe Kaman	14.888908°N 107.117133°E	2018	32	131.2	28	180		1.76
Xe Lanong 1	(Laos)	Xe Lanong	16.356276°N 106.238749°E	2020	70	269.9	67.5	302	953	
Xepian-Xenamnoy	(Laos)	Xepian/Xenamnoy	15.026115°N 106.627369°E	2019	427	1,788	73	1,600	1,043	50.6
Xe Nam Noy - Xe Katam	(Laos)	Xenamnoi/Xekatam	15.117928°N 106.616688°E	2016	20.1	83				
Xeset 1	(Laos)	Xeset	15.49200°N 106.27867°E	1994	45	154	18	124		
Xeset 2	(Laos)	Xeset	15.403775°N 106.280332°E	2009	76	309	26	144		
Xeset 3	(Laos)	Xe Don	15.342113°N 106.31115°E	2017	23	80	11			1.3
Chulabhorn	(Thailand)	Nam Phrom	16.536267°N 101.650036°E	1972	40	93	70	700	165	31
Lam Ta Khong	(Thailand)	Lam Ta Khong	14.865175°N 101.560303°E	1974	500	400	40.3	251	310	37
Pak Mun	(Thailand)	Mun	15.2818942°N 105.468058°E	1994	136	280	17	300		
Sirindhorn	(Thailand)	Lam Dom Noi	15.206339°N 105.429156°E	1971	36	86	42	940	1,967	288
Ubol Ratana	(Thailand)	Nam Pong	16.775394°N 102.618325°E	1966	25.2	57	35.1	885	2,559	410
A Luoi	(Vietnam)	A Sap	16.197619°N 107.161897°E	2012	170	686	49.5	208		
Buon Kuop	(Vietnam)	Sre Pok	12.52504°N 107.925762°E	2009	280	1,455	34	1,828	37	5.57
Buon Tua Sra	(Vietnam)	Se San/Krong Po Ko	12.282116°N 108.041299°E	2009	86	359	83	1,041	787	41
Dray Hlinh 2	(Vietnam)	Sre Pok	12.6757°N 107.903978°E	2007	16	85				
Hòa Phú	(Vietnam)	Sre Pok	12.64967°N 107.909128°E	2014	29	132	12	384.5	5	1.6
Krông Nô 2	(Vietnam)	Krong No	12.254355°N 108.355469°E	2016	30	109				9.3
Krông Nô 3	(Vietnam)	Krong No	12.254355°N 108.355469°E	2016	18	63.5	42	260	20	1.75
Plei Krong	(Vietnam)	Se San/Krong Po Ko	14.408227°N 107.862991°E	2008	100	479	65	745	1,049	53
Sesan 3	(Vietnam)	Se San	14.215816°N 107.722061°E	2006	260	1,224	79			6.4
Sesan 3A	(Vietnam)	Se San	14.106475°N 107.657753°E	2007	96					
Sesan 4	(Vietnam)	Se San	13.968252°N 107.49516°E	2009	360	60			54	
Sesan 4A	(Vietnam)	Se San	13.933374°N 107.46683°E	2009	360	60			54	
Sre Pok 3	(Vietnam)	Sre Pok	12.752344°N 107.876769°E	2009	220	52.5				
Sre Pok 4	(Vietnam)	Sre Pok	12.807331°N 107.855308°E	2009	600	329.3	155	860	114	150
Sre Pok 4A	(Vietnam)	Sre Pok	12.893464°N 107.812294°E	2014	308.35					4
Upper Kontum	(Vietnam)	Se San/Dak Bla/Dak Ngh	14.694291°N 108.229879°E	2011	250	1,056.4	73	392	174	7.08
Yali Falls	(Vietnam)	Se San	14.227481°N 107.829597°E	2001	720	3,658.6	65	1,460	1,073	64.5
Yan-Tann-Sien	(Vietnam)	Yan-Tann-Sien	12.152824°N 108.37866°E	2010	19.5	79				

Notes: COD = Commercial Operating Date

== Hydropower infrastructure under construction in the Mekong River Basin ==
Table 3: Hydropower dams under construction in the Mekong River Basin (15 MW installed capacity and above)

Project	Country	River	Location	COD	Installed capacity (MW)	Mean Annual Energy (GWh)	Height (m)	Crest length (m)	Total storage (million m^{3})	Max reservoir area (km^{2})
Pursat 1	(Cambodia)	Pursat	12.285408°N 103.298828°E	2026	80	361	100	687	1,039	
Charikou	(China)	Tsichu	32.670005°N 96.561546°E	?	54		121.4	198.48	421	
Jiaoba	(China)	Dengqu	29.579527°N 98.306028°E	?	60		50			
Houay Kaouane	(Laos)		20.06663°N 102.192339°E	?	24					
Luang Prabang	(Laos)	Mekong	20.06663°N 102.192339°E	2030	1,460	6,500	80	275	1,589.5	72.39
Nam Ang	(Laos)	Nam Ang	15.122545°N 107.108512°E	2024	31	183.3			0.03	
Nam Emoun	(Laos)	Nam Emoun	15.5743°N 106.969395°E	2025	131.5	460.59	29	127	0.07	0.16
Nam Hinboun 1	(Laos)	Nam Hinboun	17.728201°N 104.571382°E	2024	15	79.74	33	70		
Nam Hinboun 2	(Laos)	Nam Hinboun	18.023739°N 104.425006°E	?	30	155.2	38			2.57
Nam Ngao	(Laos)	Nam Hinboun	20.398288°N 100.431852°E	?	15	81.1		69	438.6	2.57
Nam Ngum 3	(Laos)	Nam Ngum	19.084097°N 102.878817°E	2024	480	2,345	220	395	1,411	27.51
Nam Ngum 4	(Laos)	Nam Ngum	19.453804°N 103.010325°E	2024	240	872	74	110		
Nam Phan (Bolevan)	(Laos)	Nam Phak	15.075548°N 106.139196°E	2025	168	788				
Nam Pot 1	(Laos)	Nam Pot	19.15518°N 103.266356°E	?	20	92				4.9
Xe Lanong 2	(Laos)	Xe Lanong	16.291893°N 106.517774°E	?	35	143	55			
Xekong A (DS)	(Laos)	Xekong	14.599171°N 106.554175°E	2025	86	334.7	8.5		95.03	25.4
Xekong 4B (DS)	(Laos)	Xekong	15.744284°N 106.748666°E	2027	175	801	117		1,004.7	22.4

Notes: COD = Commercial Operating Date

== Environmental impacts of Mekong hydropower ==
The environmental impacts of Mekong hydropower development are generally well studied and understood. Some the key impacts of Mekong hydropower are as follows:

Hydrological impacts: about 75% of annual flows through the Mekong system occur between late June and early November, which drives ecological productivity throughout the system. This surge of water is known as the 'flood pulse' and dams (of all kinds) will contribute to its diminution. Wet season flows can be expected to reduce, while dry season flows can be expected to increase. This has significant implications for the Mekong's ecology.

Fisheries impacts: the Mekong's fisheries are threatened in multiple ways, most importantly by dams and excessive fishing pressure. Dams affect fisheries by:

- Acting as barriers to fish migration - either as fish try to migrate upstream to spawn; or for trapping fish fry or eggs as these travel downstream.
- Interrupting natural flood cycles to which fish have evolved and adapted to over thousands of years.
- Riverbed hardening. Dams typically release water in bursts, which removes smaller sediments like silt, sand, and gravel, as well as aquatic plants and animals and debris from vegetation. As a result, the bedrock below the dam becomes exposed and loses its value as a fish habitat.
- Trapping sediment, a significant source of nutrition for fish.
- Altering water temperature. Water released from a dam is typically colder than prevailing temperatures downstream of the dam. This has a direct impact on fish habitats and populations.
- Hydropeaking, which refers to the release of water from HPPs when demand is highest (usually during the day), and much smaller releases when demand is low. This also affects fisheries through the rapid alteration and high and low river flows. Globally, hydropeaking has been found to impact fish biodiversity, and fish community composition.

The fisheries impact of all existing and planned mainstream dams will be most felt in Cambodia (which will experience three-quarters of the loss), while the balance will be experienced in Vietnam, Lao PDR and Thailand. In terms of tonnages, this will represent a loss of between 580 and 750,000 Mt per year.

In another study by the Mekong River Commission, fisheries assessments conducted in 2020 suggested that the annual finfish yield from the lower Mekong (i.e. those parts of the basin that fall within Cambodia, Laos, Thailand and Vietnam)) was between 1.51 and 1.71 million tonnes, while the harvest of other aquatic animals (OAAs) was approximately 443,000 tons. This is approximately 25-30% less than yield estimates conducted in 2000 and 2010. The estimated value of the fish catch varies from USD 7.13 billion to USD 8.37 billion annually. In addition, the estimated value of the OAA harvest is approximately USD 1.13 billion.

Sediment impacts: in the Mekong, some 40% of the sediments that reach the Mekong Delta are derived from the Three Parallel Rivers area in Yunnan, while some 52% come from the Central Highlands of Vietnam. The balance comes from those parts of the basin in northern Thailand, and the Tibetan gorges. Sediment loads are lowest during the dry season and highest during the first months of the flood season, when loose sediments weathered during the dry season are washed into rivers.

Although suspended sediment concentrations in the Mekong have been monitored since 1994, the ‘pre-disturbance’ sediment load is unknown. Nevertheless, studies can demonstrate very significant declines in the Mekong's sediment load since 2001. At Chiang Saen, sediment flows have decreased from about 85 million metric tonnes per year (Mt/yr) to 10.8 million Mt/yr, meaning that the sediment contributions from China to the Mekong mainstream has decreased to about 16% of all sediments in the Lower Mekong as compared to about 55% historically. A similar trend is seen down-stream at Pakse, where average loads have decreased from 147 Mt/yr to 66 Mt/yr between 1994 and 2013.

The declining sediment load has significant implications for the Mekong Delta, recharging sediments otherwise washed away by the sea, consumed by sea-level rise, or in combination with land subsidence. Studies of the possible long-term consequences of system-wide sediment reductions suggest that it is likely that nearly half of the Delta's land surface will be below sea level by 2100, with the remaining areas impacted by saline intrusion from the sea and frequent flooding. Much of the Mekong's sediment decline is attributed to the 'trapping efficiency' of dams.

Forest impacts: there is a two-way relationship between (reservoir) hydropower and deforestation in the catchments they draw on. In the absence of soil conservation measures, deforestation often contributes to increased erosion, which is then deposited in the reservoir, reducing reservoir capacity. The 1,570 MW Manwan HPP on the Mekong mainstream in China, for example, lost 21.5–22.8% of the total storage capacity to sediments in its first 11 years of operation. But hydropower can also drive deforestation. Reservoirs need to be cleared of vegetation before filling, and given the size of some reservoirs, the area subjected to clearance can be considerable. The deforestation impact of reservoir clearance in the Mekong is unknown. In 2008, an estimated 60% of the timber harvested in Laos was approved under special quotas for hydroelectric and other infra-structure projects. It has been estimated that hydropower development contributes to the loss of 13,100 ha of forest a year in Laos. Over 2006/07, the Lao national timber quota was temporarily raised by 400,000 m^{3} to allow for logging specifically related to the development of the Nam Theun 2 HPP. It has been argued that logging represents an additional motivation to hydropower development, and is frequently linked to corrupt actors.

River connectivity: 'connectivity' refers to the degree to which matter and organisms can move among spatially defined units in a natural system. ‘River connectivity’ is typically described as lateral (between a river's main channel and its floodplains), longitudinal (between upstream areas in the river channel or catchment, and downstream ones), and vertical (within the water column, between upper water layers and lower ones. River connectivity can be conceptualised as a continuum from 'fully connected' to 'disconnected'. River connectivity strongly influences the resistance and resilience of rivers to natural and human-induced disturbances.

Dams interrupt connectivity, and so fish cannot swim upstream to spawn or breed; dams affect water quality in a variety of ways, altering upstream ecosystems so that they contrast starkly with downstream ones. Dam reservoirs are lacustrine (lake-like) environments unlike rapidly flowing waters downstream; upstream, the water is heavy with sediments, while downstream it is not; above the dam, the water is cold, while below it, it is warmer.

A 2014 study explores an HPP build-out of 81 proposed dams across the Mekong Basin. If this were to occur, it would reduce the Mekong's connectivity to just 11% by 2022. This build-out – already well advanced – would make the Mekong one of the most heavily impounded rivers in the world.

Greenhouse gases: hydropower reservoirs do emit greenhouses gases (GHGs), although the volumes and types depend on the reservoir's latitude and age. Young reservoirs tend to release larger amounts of GHGs than older ones due to the availability of decomposing vegetation and other organic matter soon after initial inundation; tropical reservoirs tend to release more than temperate ones due to higher rates of net primary production.

In the Mekong, one study looked at 119 reservoirs across the basin, and found that these emit between 0.2 and 1,994 kg of CO_{2} per MWh over a 100-year lifetime with a median of 26 kg of CO per MWh. Hydropower reservoirs that also provided irrigation water (22) had generally higher emissions reaching over 22,000 kg of CO_{2} per MWh. Yearly emissions ranged from 26 to 181,3 000 Mt of CO_{2} per year over a 100-year lifetime, with a median of 28,000 Mt of CO_{2} per year. Altogether, 82% of hydropower reservoirs (119) and 45% of reservoirs also providing irrigation (22) had emissions comparable to other renewable energy sources (<190 kg CO_{2} per MWh), while the rest had higher emissions equivalent to fossil fuel power plants (>380 kg CO_{2} per MWh). These results, the study authors caution, are tentative and they suggest that hydropower in the Mekong Region cannot be considered categorically as low-emission energy. Instead, the GHG emissions of hydropower should be carefully considered case-by-case.

== Mekong hydropower and resettlement of affected communities ==
People are affected by hydropower in a diversity of ways. Most immediately are those displaced by an HPP (i.e. resettled due to the presence of the dam itself, its reservoir, and/or ancillary buildings and infrastructure). Then there are those who will be affected by fisheries and sediment losses, and/or losses arising due to hydrological changes. Such populations may be eligible for compensation. Finally, there are broader impacts, related to the ways in which hydropower affects national economies. This section focuses on involuntary displacement and resettlement due to hydropower in the Mekong.

Figures for the number of people displaced by hydropower development are scattered and not generally available. Where data are available, they are as follows:

Table 4: Resettlement of hydropower-displaced people in the Mekong River Basin

Project	Country	Status	No. resettled
Battambang 1	(Cambodia)	Commissioned	4,350
Lower Sesan 2	(Cambodia)	Commissioned	4,809
Pursat 1	(Cambodia)	Under construction	1,436
Dachaoshan	(China)	Commissioned	6,363
Dahuaqiao	(China)	Commissioned	4,061
Gongguoqiao	(China)	Commissioned	3,476
Huangdeng	(China)	Commissioned	4,415
Jinfeng	(China)	Commissioned	126
Jinghong	(China)	Commissioned	2,264
Lidi	(China)	Commissioned	575
Lin Chang	(China)	Commissioned	69
Manwan	(China)	Commissioned	7,260
Miaowei	(China)	Commissioned	11,036
Nuozhadu	(China)	Commissioned	43,602
Tuoba	(China)	Under construction	5,951
Wunonglong	(China)	Commissioned	1,268
Xiaowan	(China)	Commissioned	38,646
Xu Cun	(China)	Commissioned	400
Don Sahong	(Laos)	Commissioned	66
Houay Ho	(Laos)	Commissioned	3,000
Luang Prabang	(Laos)	Under construction	12,966
Nam Hinboun 2	(Laos)	Commissioned	1,200
Nam Kong 1	(Laos)	Commissioned	1,612
Nam Leuk	(Laos)	Commissioned	134
Nam Lik 1-2	(Laos)	Commissioned	3,127
Nam Mang 3	(Laos)	Commissioned	1,200
Nam Ngiep 2	(Laos)	Commissioned	407
Nam Ngum 1	(Laos)	Commissioned	3,242
Nam Ngum 2	(Laos)	Commissioned	6,234
Nam Ngum 3	(Laos)	Under construction	523
Nam Ou 1	(Laos)	Commissioned	3,080
Nam Ou 2	(Laos)	Commissioned	700
Nam Ou 3	(Laos)	Commissioned	560
Nam Ou 4	(Laos)	Commissioned	630
Nam Ou 5	(Laos)	Commissioned	910
Nam Ou 6	(Laos)	Commissioned	210
Nam Ou 7	(Laos)	Commissioned	490
Nam San 3A	(Laos)	Under construction	2,832
Nam Tha 1	(Laos)	Commissioned	10,523
Nam Theun 1	(Laos)	Commissioned	2,623
Nam Theun 2	(Laos)	Commissioned	6,200
Theun-Hinboun	(Laos)	Commissioned	4,367
Xe Bang Hieng 2	(Laos)	Commissioned	2,700
Xe Pian-Xe Nam Noy	(Laos)	Commissioned	800
Xe Pon 3	(Laos)	Commissioned	600
Xekong 3B	(Laos)	Commissioned	240
Xekong 4A	(Laos)	Commissioned	4,458
Xekong 5	(Laos)	Commissioned	440
Ubol Ratana	(Thailand)	Commissioned	30,000
A Luoi	(Vietnam)	Commissioned	872
Buôn Kốp	(Vietnam)	Commissioned	4,732
Buon Tua Srah	(Vietnam)	Commissioned	2,215
Dray Hinh 1	(Vietnam)	Commissioned	153
Plei Krong	(Vietnam)	Commissioned	6,239
Sesan 3A	(Vietnam)	Commissioned	665
Sesan 4	(Vietnam)	Commissioned	1,021
Sre Pok 3	(Vietnam)	Commissioned	9,279
Upper Kontum	(Vietnam)	Commissioned	1,363
Yali	(Vietnam)	Commissioned	24,610

In 2011, it was estimated that hydropower development in Laos would result in the resettlement of between 100,000 and 280,000 people. In 2019, the Lao Minister of Energy and Mines estimated that, up until that point, 60,000 people from 12,000 families from more than 200 villages across Laos had been resettled to make way for power projects. Similar estimates are not available for other parts of the Mekong River Basin.

== See also ==
- Mekong
- Mekong Delta
- Stung Sen River
- Se San River
- Tonle Sap
- Nam Ngum Dam
- Mekong River Commission
- Yali Falls Dam
- Greater Mekong Sub-region Academic and Research Network
- GMS Environment Operations Center
- Hydropower in China
