= Lower Sre Pok 2 Dam =

Dam in Stung Treng, Cambodia

Lower Sre Pok 2 Hydropower Dam
- Country: Cambodia
- Location: Tonle Sre Pok
- Status: Proposed
- Opening date: 2018
- Construction cost: US$338.9 million
- Owner: EVN

Dam and spillways
- Type of dam: Run-of-river
- Impounds: Sre Pok River
- Height: 25 m (82 ft)

Reservoir
- Total capacity: 0.42 km^{3} (340,000 acre⋅ft)
- Catchment area: 30,620 km^{2} (11,820 sq mi)
- Surface area: 120 km^{2} (46 sq mi)

Power Station
- Installed capacity: 400 MW (540,000 hp) (max. )
- Annual generation: 1,174 GWh (4,230 TJ)

The Lower Se San/Sre Pok 2 scheme hydroelectric dam is located in Stung Treng Province, Cambodia on the Tonle Sre Pok some 2 kilometres (1.2 mi) upstream of its confluence with the Se San, and about 37 kilometres (23 mi) upstream of the confluence of the combined Sre Pok, Se San and Se Kong rivers with the Mekong mainstream. The dam was officially opened on December 18, 2018.

== See also ==
- Mekong
- Mekong River
