= HHPC =

HHPC may refer to:

- Hanke–Henry Permanent Calendar
- Houay Ho Power Company, operator of Houay Ho Dam
- NASA Human Health and Performance Center
