= TTW =

TTW may stand for:

- Type to winners
- Tennessee–Tombigbee Waterway
- Territorial waters
- Thai Tap Water Supply, tap water producer and distributor in Thailand
- Tilting three-wheeler
- The Time Traveler's Wife
- Transition to war
- Tigerair Taiwan, ICAO code for a low-cost carrier based in Taiwan formed as a joint venture between China Airlines Group and Tiger Airways Holdings
