= Gongguoqiao Dam =

Hydroelectric dam in Yunnan, China

- Location within China
- Country: China
- Location: Yunlong County, Dali Bai Autonomous Prefecture, Yunnan
- Coordinates: 25°35′10.42″N 99°20′8.06″E
- Purpose: Power
- Status: Operational
- Construction began: 2008
- Opening date: 2011

Dam and spillways
- Type of dam: Gravity, roller-compacted concrete
- Impounds: Lancang (Mekong) River
- Height: 105 m (344 ft)
- Length: 356 m (1,168 ft)

Reservoir
- Total capacity: 120,000,000 m^{3} (97,000 acre⋅ft)

Power Station
- Operator: Huaneng Lancang Hydropower Co Ltd
- Commission date: 2011–2012
- Type: Conventional
- Turbines: 4 x 225 MW Francis-type
- Installed capacity: 900 MW

The Gongguoqiao Dam is a gravity dam on the Lancang (Mekong) River in Yunlong County of Yunnan Province, China. The primary purpose of the dam is hydroelectric power generation. Construction began in 2008, and the river was diverted around the dam site in 2009. The next year concrete placement began, and in 2011 the first generator was commissioned. The 900 MW power station was fully operational on 21 June 2012.

== See also ==
- Hydropower in the Mekong River Basin
- List of dams and reservoirs in China
- List of tallest dams in China
