= Nam Ou river cascade dams =

Hydroelectric dams in Laos

The Nam Ou cascade hydropower project is a series of seven hydroelectric dams along the Nam Ou river which are located in the provinces of Phongsaly and Luang Prabang in northern Laos. The project is managed by the Power Construction Corporation of China (PowerChina) and the Lao government. The project is the series of dams include seven levels of reservoirs in an attempt to mitigate ecological deterioration. The construction of the hydropower project is being completed in two phases. Phase I of the dams, including Nam Ou 2, Nam Ou 5, and Nam Ou 6 began operating on May 12, 2016. Phase II of the dams, including Nam Ou 1, 3, 4, and 7 is expected to be completed in 2020.

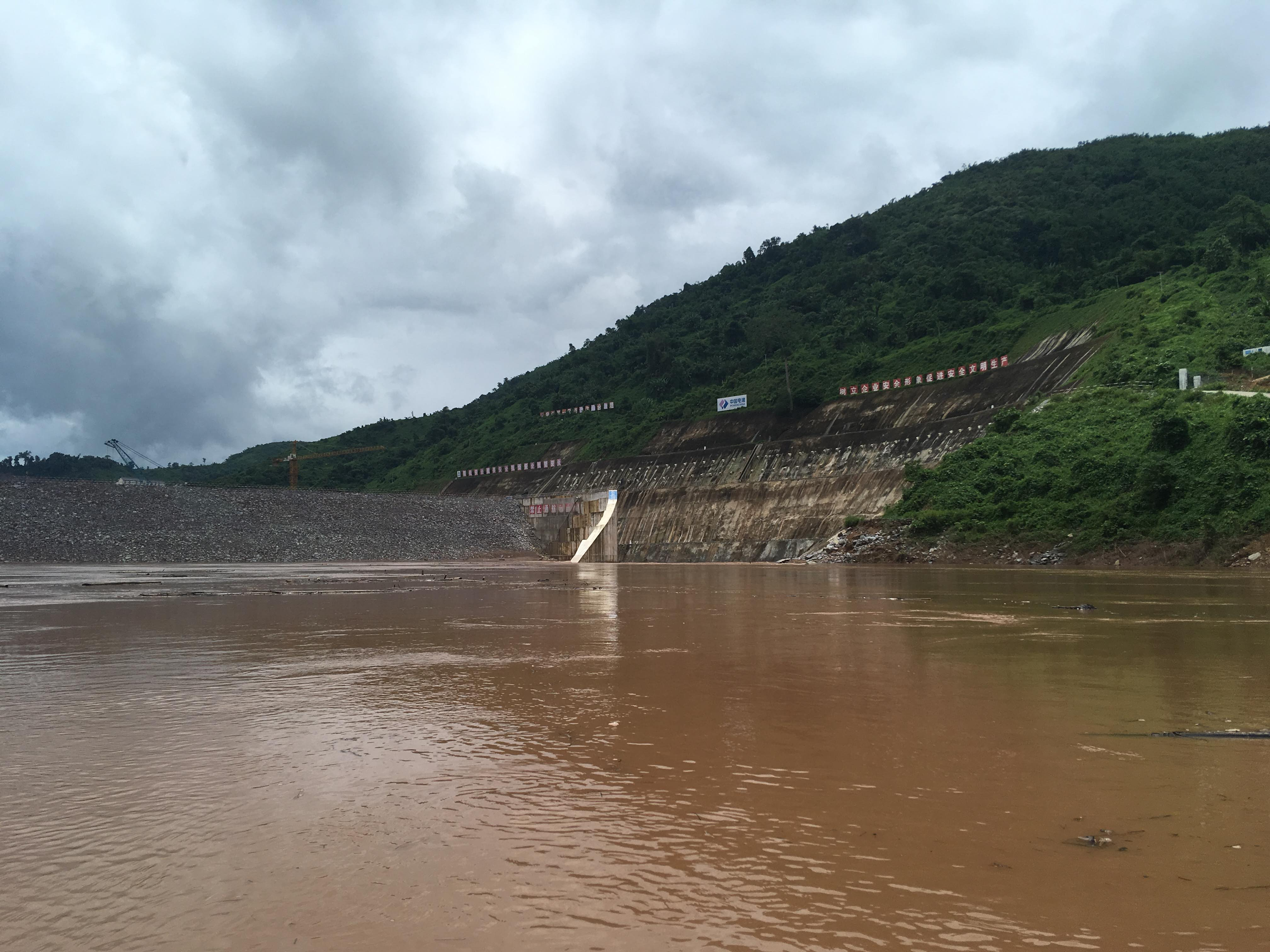
Nam Ou 3 station part of phase II of the Nam Ou cascade hydropower project

== Background of the project ==
The Lao government and Sinohydro, a Chinese based project contractor, signed a $2.733 billion deal of investment in April 2011 with the aim of financing the construction of a series of hydropower dams on the Nam Ou river. The contract of the project is to Build-Operate-Transfer. This type of contract incorporates both private and public resources to complete the project. While Sinohydro is responsible for all the aspects of constructing the project, the company will also have the operation rights for a 29-year period upon completion of the project. The complete capacity of all seven dams will total 1.272 million kilowatts. The installed capacity of both phases of the project will be greater than the total capacity of the Nam Theun 2 and less than the total capacity of the Xayaburi Dam. While this trend of large hydropower projects in Laos is believed by some to demonstrate a modernizing nation, other scholars worry about the environmental and social consequences of this proliferation of projects. Sinohydro began operations in Laos more than 20 years ago while overseeing contracts of over 30 projects such as bridges, railways, roads, construction of water conservancy, and municipal engineering construction.

The Nam Ou cascade dams mark the first time that a Chinese company has held development rights of a foreign project. It is also the first project executed by PowerChina (merged with Sinohydro and now both operate under the title of PowerChina) with a global strategy within the CCP’s Belt and Road Initiative. The Nam Ou cascade dams were developed to become the main power sources for Northern Laos and provide energy to other development projects in the region including the China-Laos Railway IV and V segments. The project also fits under Lao government objectives to become the “Battery of Southeast Asia”, with electricity as a commodity serving to boost the national economy. In the two months following its opening in 2017, the first phase of the project has generated 4 billion kWh. The second phase of the project is expected to provide 12% of total electricity in Laos.

== Chinese companies' role in the project ==
The hydropower sector has been prioritized by the Chinese government since the announcement of the 1999 Go Out policy. Under this initiative, Chinese companies have become the largest portion of hydropower project financiers and builders globally. Power China Resources’ (Sinohydro's parent company) share of international hydropower development market comprised half of the entire industry.

This project is being constructed following a BOT model. This model is also being incorporated in projects involving Chinese construction firms in Nepal, Macedonia, Cambodia, Burma, and Pakistan. The disadvantage of this approach includes the difficulty of mitigating the social and environmental impacts of these massive projects. While there are other countries with high -potential hydropower, Southeast Asia has been the focal region for the development of these projects, representing 41% of all foreign hydropower projects with Chinese involvement in 2017. After merging with PowerChina, Sinohydro has become a project contractor primarily. In the past decade, Sinohydro has been the leading Chinese company in terms of most projects constructed totaling 118 and most hydropower capacity totaling 42,828 MW. PowerChina is a BOT developer that works with contractors like Sinohydro to develop hydropower projects.

== Lao government's role in the project ==
The Lao government is responsible for the oversight of Sinohydro’s and PowerChina’s projects including the effects these projects have on the surrounding communities. PowerChina claims that the company has incorporated local development into its projects including training and employing up to 13,600 Lao workers in the projects and resettlement village construction. PowerChina also attempts to collaborate with local construction and development companies to boost relevant Laos industries. PowerChina was awarded the “Commendation of Taxation Work” by the Lao Department of the Ministry of Finance in 2017. The Lao government also awarded Power China with the “Outstanding SME Development Award” and “Special Contribution Award” in 2016 for the Nam Ngum 5 Hydropower station. The Nam Ou cascade dam project has also sponsored Lao students’ education in China; six Lao students were selected to study at Wuhan University starting in 2017. PowerChina also states that it complies with the Lao government’s environmental regulations. The Lao government also awarded the company the “Special Social and Environmental Contribution Award” in 2016 for their investments in a local campaign to protect forests and rivers.

== Response to Xe Pian-Xe Namnoy collapse ==
The Xe Pian-Xe Namnoy hydropower complex collapsed on July 23, 2018 causing damage to homes and agriculture 80 kilometers from the site and killing at least 71 people. The project had South Korean, Thai, American, and Lao stakeholders including SK E&C and Korea Western Power. The Xe Pian-Xe Namnoy project also followed a BOT model. 5000 villagers displaced by the collapse are still living in displacement camps. The Lao Law on Resettlement and Vocation detailed that these survivors cannot gain new housing until permanent replacement housing in a new area is constructed in 4-5 years. According to International Rivers, villagers expressed their dismay and confusion that they would not be able to return to the location of their former village.

PowerChina was proactive and immediate in their response to the Lao government during this catastrophe. This response included sending the Lao Ministry of Energy and Mines a message of condolence and two subsidiaries of PowerChina (Chengdu Engineering Corporation Ltd. and Kunming Engineering Corporation Ltd.) joined the World Bank and Lao Ministry of Energy and Mines in the subsequent safety investigations of the site. All built or in-construction hydropower projects were investigated for potential errors following the collapse. The Lao government also halted all hydropower project construction and planning in order to have a national review of development strategy. PowerChina offered the Lao government technical assistance and support as well as engaged in rescue work in the affected areas.

== Environmental and social impacts ==
The entire series of dams in the project will spread across 80% of the Nam Ou river. International Rivers conducted an Environmental and Social Impact Assessment of Nam Ou 6 and Nam Ou 2. In the assessments, the research team was hosted by PowerChina and were only able to interview company chosen members of the local community. Company staff was also present during the interviews.

=== Biodiversity and food ===
The Nam Ou 6 dam is expected to cause the loss of 2,234 hectares of land because of construction site land use and river inundation. The entire cascade hydropower project is expected to result in a loss of 66% of fish biodiversity of the river. This biodiversity loss is partly caused by the pressure caused by the dams on fish traversing the river as well as by the loss of 70% of sediment that flows into the Mekong River. 70% of fish caught in the river are sold while 30% are consumed locally. This sediment loss will also have a detrimental effect on riverside agriculture and rice cultivation in the Mekong River Basin. The environmental impact of the project on the Phou Den Din National Protected Area near Nam Ou 6 will most likely be detrimental. This area is home to some populations of endangered species including Indochinese tigers and Asiatic elephants. The area was previously undisturbed by human activities and uninhabited. The effect that the Nam Ou 6 project will have on the 265 species found in and surrounding the river is unknown.

There have been attempts to mitigate the impact of these types of hydropower projects by companies by including features in the dam that are meant to allow for the safe passage of fish. Some scholars are skeptical of the viability of these solutions, but even if successful, the dams still cause stagnant waters that could destroy fish breeding grounds. Food security and food safety is a concern for the future. The degradation of riverside agriculture as a result of lack of sediment and decreasing fishing yields could have a major effect on the nutrition of people dependent on the river as a major food source. Climate change may also restrict the industry of farmed fishing as another food source.

=== Resettlement ===
Thousands of Laos villagers from hundreds of villages have been relocated to resettlement villages as a result of the construction of the Nam Ou cascade hydropower project. Villagers are granted compensation that is determined by the Lao government and PowerChina. The level of compensation is based on the number of people living in the initial village home. This has led to complaints from certain villagers with less populated homes that had many amenities. If only a few members lived in the previous home, then they will receive a smaller home in the resettlement village. This system doesn’t account from the loss of high value properties that were inhabited by only a few family members. The homes and improvements of surrounding land may have generations of history, but the number of inhabitants was measured at the times of the project was the sole determinant factor to the size of their resettlement home and compensation. Other villagers report a lack of accountability and transparency among district authorities responsible for relocation.

Complaints filed by villagers may not receive any response. Many villagers also lament losing access to the sites where their ancestors are buried. Some villagers also report that resettlement villages are not to the standard reported by the Lao government and PowerChina. Some report that they only received a fraction of the land that they were initially promised while others claim the new relocation villages are already damaged by insects. PowerChina has invested $1.86 million into the construction of and repairs of bridges, roads, schools, and health centers in neighboring villages to projects and resettlement villages. Another frustration in the relocation process involves the lack of public participation. Large scale hydropower projects have also been criticized by academics like Richard Frankel for creating high greenhouse gas emissions and underwhelming economic returns.

== See also ==
- Environmental impacts of dams
- Hydroelectricity
- Wildlife of Laos
- Economy of Laos
