= Daewoo E&C =

South Korean construction company

Daewoo Engineering & Construction Co., Ltd.
- Type: Public
- Traded as: KRX: 047040
- Industry: Construction
- Headquarters: Seoul, South Korea
- Parent: Jungheung Construction

Korean name
- Hangul: 대우건설
- Hanja: 大宇建設
- RR: Daeu geonseol
- MR: Taeu kŏnsŏl
- Website: daewooenc.com/eng

Daewoo Engineering & Construction Co., Ltd. (Korean: 대우건설) is a Korean construction company founded and established in 1973, headquartered in Seoul, South Korea. The previous company name was Daewoo Construction Co, Ltd. Its main constructions in Korea include Wolseong Nuclear Power Plant, Nurimaru, Busan-Geoje Fixed Link. Its major constructions abroad consist of the Swani Hospital Project, Menara Telekom Tower and the Houay Ho Dam in Laos.

== History ==
Daewoo Engineering & Construction Co., Ltd. was founded in 1973 and changed to Daewoo's construction division in the 1980s, expanding its scope of activities. It is part of the Jungheung Group. In line with Daewoo's declaration of global management in 1993, the company tried to expand its business more actively under the slogan of global village construction. However, Daewoo Group faced a workout in 1999, and Daewoo Co., Ltd. was separated into three companies: Daewoo Engineering & Construction Co., Ltd., Daewoo Co., Ltd., and Daewoo International Co., Ltd. Daewoo Co., Ltd., which took all the bad assets, was delisted, and Daewoo International was incorporated into POSCO in 2010 and became POSCO Daewoo (now POSCO International).

Daewoo Engineering & Construction, acquired by the Korea Asset Management Corporation, ended its workout early in 2003 based on its apartment brand Prugio and overseas orders, and also offered KRW 300 million to sponsor Daegu FC, Korea's first civic club founded the same year. When Kumho Asiana Group acquired it in 2006, it went through a difficult time, selling its real assets such as the Seoul Station Daewoo Center (currently Seoul Square) and participating in the acquisition of Korea Express.[6] It was acquired by the Korea Development Bank in 2010 due to the liquidity crisis of Kumho Asiana Group in 2009.

Daewoo Engineering & Construction once rose to No. 1 in construction capacity evaluation for three consecutive years (2006-2008), but fell to No. 6 in 2011. It ranked third in 2012, third in 2013, fifth in 2014, third in 2015, fourth in 2016, third in 2017, fourth in 2018, fifth in 2019, sixth in 2020, and fifth in 2021. It was acquired by Jungheung Construction (based in Gwangju Metropolitan City) in December 2021.

== Business and major projects ==
Daewoo Engineering & Construction branches into major categories of construction.

- Oil and gas: Escravos GTL, NLNG Train Six Bonny Island, Algeria Oman Fertilizer Project, Arzew GNL 3Z Project
- Power: Sur Independent Power Plant, Jorf Lasfar 5&6 Coal-fired Power Plant, Benghazi North Combined Cycle Power Plant, Ulsan Power Plant Extension Project, Hadong Thermal Power Plant No. 1, 2, 3, 4, 5, 6
- Nuclear: Wolsong Nuclear Powerplant Unit 3 & 4, Jordan Research and Training Reactor
- Industrial: Gwangyang Steel Plant, Phase 4, Bio-Manufacturing Facility Project, 500 T/D Kraft Paper Plant
- Environment: Jungdong Municipal Waste Incineration Plant, Daejangdong Municipal Waste Incineration Plant, Sanbuk Municipal Waste Incineration Plant
- Transportation: Palau Compact Road Project, Palau Compact Road, Pusan~Keoje Fixed Link Private Participation Project
- Harbor/Dam: Extension Works for Djen Djen Port Protection, Nakilat Ship Repair Yard, Duqm Ship Repair Yard
- Building: Malaysia KLCC Tower, Jeju Convention Center, National Central Museum
- Housing: Hanoi New Town Development / Vietnam, Boughzoul New Town Development PJ / Algeria

== See also ==
- Korea Development Bank
