= Huangdeng Dam =

Dam in Yunnan, China

Huangdeng dam
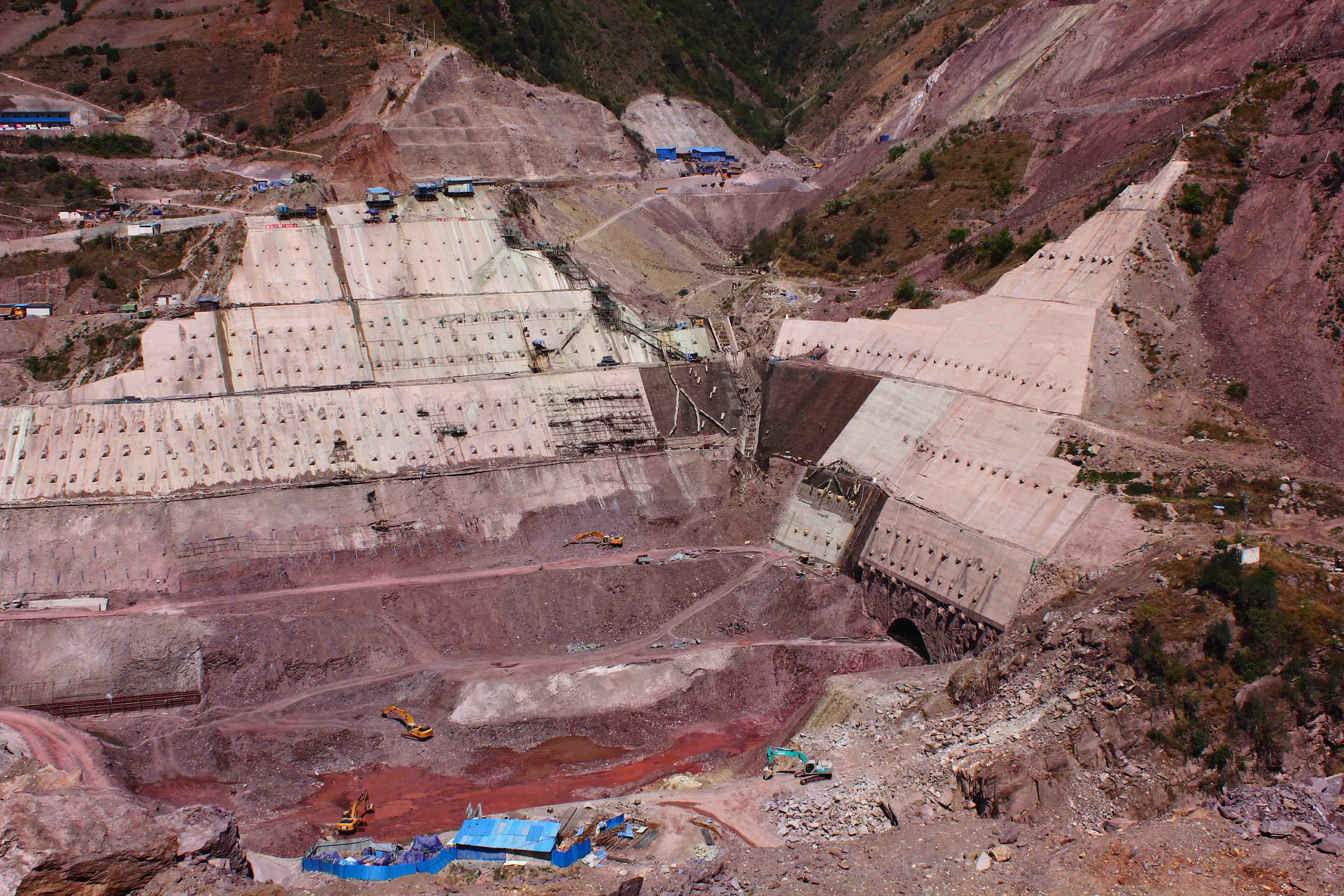
- Huangdeng During Construction
- Interactive map of Huangdeng dam
- Country: China
- Location: Yunnan Province
- Coordinates: 26°33′33″N 99°06′56″E
- Purpose: Power, irrigation, recreation
- Status: Operational
- Construction began: January 2010
- Opening date: June 2019
- Owners: Yunnan Huaneng Lancang River Hydropower Co., Ltd.

Dam and spillways
- Impounds: Lancang (upper Mekong)
- Height (thalweg): 203 m
- Length: 464 m
- Dam volume: 3,678,000 m3

Reservoir
- Total capacity: 1,613,000,000 m3

Power Station
- Commission date: 2019
- Installed capacity: 1,900 MW

The Huangdeng Dam is a gravity dam recently completed on the Lancang (Mekong) River in Lanping Bai and Pumi Autonomous County of Yunnan Province, China. The fact that work on the dam was begun without formal approval from the central government was a subject of some controversy.

Construction on the dam began in 2010 and its 1,900 MW hydroelectric power station was initially planned to be operational in 2016, with the entire project complete in 2018. The first unit was put into operation in July 2018 and the dam was fully commissioned in January 2019.

== See also ==
- Hydropower in the Mekong River Basin
- List of tallest dams in the world
- List of dams and reservoirs in China
- List of tallest dams in China
