= Wunonglong Dam =

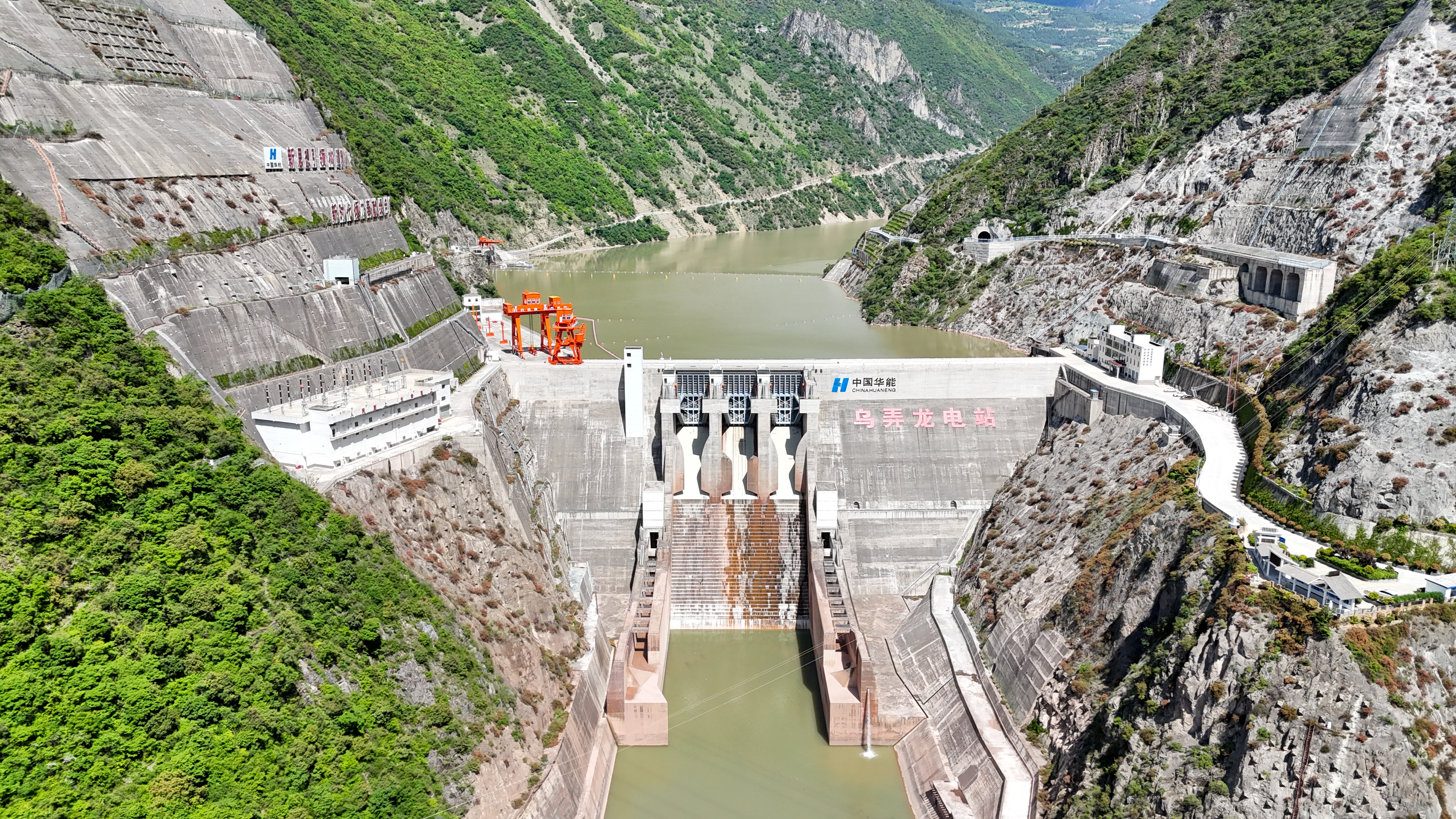

- Location within China
- Country: China
- Location: Weixi Lisu Autonomous County, Dêqên Tibetan Autonomous Prefecture, Yunnan
- Coordinates: 27°56′19″N 98°55′27″E
- Purpose: Power
- Status: Operational
- Construction began: 2010
- Opening date: 2018

Dam and spillways
- Type of dam: Gravity, roller-compacted concrete
- Impounds: Lancang (Mekong) River
- Height: 137 m (449 ft)
- Length: 247.1 m (811 ft)

Reservoir
- Total capacity: 272,000,000 m^{3} (221,000 acre⋅ft)
- Catchment area: 85,900 km^{2} (33,200 mi^{2})

Power Station
- Commission date: 2018-2019 (est.)
- Type: Conventional
- Turbines: 3 x 330 MW Francis-type
- Installed capacity: 990 MW

The Wunonglong Dam (Chinese: 乌弄龙水电站) is a gravity dam situated on the Lancang (Mekong) River in Weixi Lisu Autonomous County, Yunnan of Yunnan Province, China. The primary purpose of the dam is hydroelectric power production. Construction on the dam began in 2010 and the river was diverted around the foundation in November 2014. In 2016, construction began on the main dam, which was subsequently completed in 2017. By July 2019, all four hydroelectric generators were operational and the power station was operating at its full capacity of 990 MW.

The construction of the Wunonglong Dam significantly altered the social and agricultural landscape of Cizhong and neighboring villages. Although the historic village itself was not flooded, the reservoir inundated settlements upstream, leading to large-scale resettlement programs. To accommodate displaced populations, much of Cizhong's flat agricultural land was converted into housing developments, roads, and other infrastructure.

The loss of farmland affected traditional livelihoods based on rice cultivation, viticulture, and small-scale agriculture. Local vineyards, including plots associated with the region's historic wine-making tradition, were reduced or removed. Before the dam project, Cizhong was known for its Catholic heritage and vineyards descended from grape varieties introduced by French missionaries in the nineteenth century. Several family-owned vineyards disappeared following land conversion, leaving only a small number of producers maintaining the historic cultivars.

The transformation of the landscape also affected tourism. Cizhong had previously attracted visitors interested in its rural scenery, Catholic church, and wine culture. Following the relocation project, residents reported a decline in longer stays and tourism-related income, as the village increasingly became a brief stop rather than a destination.

== See also ==
- Hydropower in the Mekong River Basin
- List of tallest dams in the world
- List of dams and reservoirs in China
- List of tallest dams in China
