= CH. Karnchang =

Company of Thailand

CH. Karnchang Public Company Limited
- Native name: บริษัท ช.การช่าง จำกัด (มหาชน)
- Traded as: SET: CK
- ISIN: TH0530010Z06
- Founded: November 27, 1972; 53 years ago
- Founder: Plew Trivisvavet
- Headquarters: Bangkok, Thailand
- Key people: Supamas Trivisvavet (CEO and president)
- Subsidiaries: Bangkok Expressway and Metro; CK Power Public Company Limited; Thai Tap Water Supply

CH. Karnchang Public Company Limited (CK, Thai: บริษัท ช.การช่าง จำกัด (มหาชน)) is a Thai contractor and construction firm, operating in Thailand and Laos. The second-largest construction firm in Thailand, CH. Karnchang was founded in 1972 in Bangkok, by Plew Trivisvavet and his four brothers. Supamas Trivisvavet became president and CEO in 2015.

== Bangkok rail transit ==
CH. Karnchang has constructed various metro lines in Bangkok. In 2024, CH. Karnchang was awarded the tender to conduct design and civil works for the MRT Orange Line's western extension.

== CK Power PCL ==
CH. Karnchang's power generation subsidiary, CK Power PCL, constructs and operates a variety of renewable energy projects. CK Power has constructed dams on the Mekong River in Laos, including the Nam Ngum 2 Hydroelectric Power Plant and the Xayaburi Dam.
