= Don Sahong Dam =

Dam in Champasak, Laos

- Location within Laos
- Country: Laos
- Location: Champasak Province
- Coordinates: 13°56′37.87″N 105°57′22.62″E
- Purpose: Power
- Status: Operational
- Construction began: January 2016
- Opening date: January 2020
- Construction cost: $500 million
- Owners: Mega First Corporation Berhad (80%); Électricité du Laos (20%)

Dam and spillways
- Impounds: Mekong
- Height: 22.5 m (74 ft)
- Elevation at crest: 77 m
- Dam volume: 130,000 m^{3}

Power Station
- Commission date: January 2020
- Type: Run-of-the-river
- Hydraulic head: 17 m
- Turbines: 4 x 65 MW
- Installed capacity: 260 MW
- Annual generation: 2000 GW·h

The Don Sahong is a hydroelectric dam commissioned in 2020 on the Mekong River in Siphandone area of Champasak Province, Laos, less than two kilometers upstream of the Laos–Cambodia border.

== Description ==
The Don Sahong Dam is a run-of-the-river hydroelectricity facility at the downstream end of the Hou Sahong channel between Don Sahong and Don Sadam islands. The dam is 22.5 m high. It has an installed capacity of 260 MW, provided by four bulb turbines 65 MW each. Most of the produced electricity will be exported to Thailand and Cambodia. A dedicated 195 MW power line connecting the power station with Cambodia has been commissioned in early 2020.

== History ==
In March 2006, the Government of Laos signed a memorandum of understanding with the Malaysian engineering and construction company, Mega First Corporation Berhad, for a feasibility study of the project. In February 2008, a project development agreement was signed.

On 30 September 2013, the government of Laos notified the Mekong River Commission of its intention to construct the Don Sahong Dam. This was controversial among other Mekong River Commission member states Cambodia, Thailand, and Vietnam, who argued that as a mainstream dam, Don Sahong is subject to Prior Consultation under the Mekong River Commission Procedures for Notification, Prior Consultation, and Agreement (PNPCA). Under these procedures, the proponent nation of a mainstream dam is required to not only notify neighbouring countries of its intention, but also to undertake a consultation aimed at reaching consensus with neighbouring states. The Government of Laos has maintained that as the dam site is only on a channel within the mainstream of the river, it is not subject to the process of Prior Consultation like dams that cover the entire mainstream such as the Xayaburi Dam.

In June 2014, the government of Laos agreed to have the Don Sahong Hydropower Project undergo the MRC's prior consultation process. This process, part of the 1995 Mekong Agreement, aims to reach consensus among members, but is non-binding as was demonstrated in the case of Xayaburi Dam, which has proceeded despite no consensus from the prior consultation process. Similarly for Don Sahong, the members of the MRC could not come to an agreement on how to proceed with the project, and it was referred to a governmental level.

The dam proposal sparked controversy among civil society groups, especially in Cambodia, where groups are concerned about impacts on fisheries. One group went so far as to call for a boycott of Angkor Beer, given the brewer's financial involvements with dam developers.

The Don Sahong Power Company entered into a concession agreement with the government of Laos on 15 September 2015, on a build, operate and transfer basis, with a concession period of 25 years after the commercial operation date, expected to be in 2019. An EPC contract with Sinohydro was signed on 15 October 2015, marking the start of construction.

The first of four generators of the dam started its test in October 2019. The whole hydropower plant started operating in January 2020.

== Developers, engineers and financiers ==
The developer backing the Don Sahong Dam is Mega First Corporation Berhad, a Malaysian company which owns the British Virgin Islands-incorporated company Don Sahong Power Company. Engineering feasibility studies were completed by AECOM.

== Impact ==
Developers suggest that the project would have "no significant impact" on the local environment, however both the governments of Cambodia and Vietnam, and a variety of civil society groups have raised concerns over uncertain or likely impacts, especially on fisheries. Independent fisheries experts contend that the dam would have a serious impact on fish migration as the channel is the only one within the Khone Falls complex that is passable to migratory fishes in the dry season, and the major migration channel year-round.

The developers argue that given the declining local fish catches, the removal of fish traps from the much smaller channels surrounding the dam site, as well as other modifications to depth and channel bathymetry will enable these routes to replace the Don Sahong as a passageway for fish migration. The viability of these alternative routes has been questioned by government representatives of Cambodia, Thailand, and Vietnam, with the latter suggesting "it is not possible to replace the modified channels for upstream fish migration with the existing Hou Sahong". Scientists have raised concerns over the adequacy of the EIA, queried this approach to fishery mitigation as experimental and unproven, and labeled the belief that mitigation measures would be effective as "faith based".

The Don Sahong Hydropower Project poses a major threat to the Mekong River's critically endangered population of Irrawaddy dolphin. The risk was considered very high for the small resident sub-population living in the Veun Nyang/Anlong Cheuteal pool that straddles the Lao/Cambodian border, and was the only remaining dolphin population in Laos. The Don Sahong Dam had been predicted to cause the extirpation of dolphins from Laos in 2014. The last dolphin died in 2022, two years after the dam started operation. Threats to the dolphins include the blasting of large volumes of rock from the channel, the intensive heavy industrial activity at the site, modifications to the river flows, along with pushing local fishers further into the dolphins' habitat. The construction plan for the Don Sahong Project excludes underwater blasting downstream of the dam site. Almost all excavation will be from drained sections of the upper Hou Sahong, though blasting would still occur very near the dolphins behind a coffer dam. Despite this minor mitigation effort, damage to the dolphin's sensitive hearing structures is expected and could prove fatal. Mechanical excavation would also continue below the dam to very near the animals. Other risks identified include the long-term effects of disturbance and stress on the animals, and the demographic consequences if the sub-population near the dam was extirpated. The persistence of threats at the site means that only the lowest risk activities are compatible with dolphin persisting in the area, though developers state that "construction impacts [on dolphins are] necessary".

The project would reduce flow to the Khone Phapheng Falls and surrounding channels. Environmental impact assessment documents indicate that the guaranteed flow would be the equivalent of an extreme dry-season low-flow (800 cubic meters per second).

As the Siphandone area is considered as a potential Ramsar site, construction of the dam would threaten its eligibility for the Ramsar status.

The Thako Project is another hydroelectric project proposed for the Phapheng channel, which is adjacent to the Sahong channel and also within the Siphandone. The Thako and Don Sahong projects are economically incompatible due to competition for the same water resources. Thako has been promoted as more sustainable than Don Sahong as it does not block a river channel. However, it would produce less electricity. Feasibility and EIA processes have been completed for both proposals, but the government of Laos has yet to agree to either proposal.
