= Miaowei Dam =

- Location within China
- Country: China
- Location: Yunlong County, Dali Bai Autonomous Prefecture, Yunnan
- Coordinates: 25°51′15.66″N 99°9′40.78″E
- Purpose: Power
- Status: Operational
- Construction began: 2010
- Owner: Lancang River Company

Dam and spillways
- Type of dam: Embankment, rock-fill
- Impounds: Lancang (Mekong) River
- Height: 139.8 m (459 ft)
- Length: 576.7 m (1,892 ft)
- Width (crest): 12 m (39 ft)

Reservoir
- Total capacity: 660,000,000 m^{3} (540,000 acre⋅ft)
- Catchment area: 93,900 km^{2} (36,300 mi^{2})

Power Station
- Commission date: 2017-2018
- Type: Conventional
- Turbines: 4 x 350 MW Francis-type
- Installed capacity: 1,400 MW
- Annual generation: 5,990 GWh (expected)

The Miaowei Dam is a rock-filled embankment dam on the Lancang (Mekong) River in Yunlong County of Yunnan Province, China. Construction on the dam began in 2010. The four turbines of 1,400 MW hydroelectric power station were commissioned in 2017 and 2018.

== See also ==
- Hydropower in the Mekong River Basin
- List of tallest dams in the world
- List of dams and reservoirs in China
- List of tallest dams in China
