= Dahuaqiao Dam =

Dam in Nujiang Lisu, Yunnan, China

- Location within China
- Country: China
- Location: Lanping Bai and Pumi Autonomous County, Nujiang Lisu Autonomous Prefecture, Yunnan
- Coordinates: 26°20′26.40″N 99°8′36.50″E
- Purpose: Power
- Status: Operational
- Construction began: 2010
- Opening date: 2018

Dam and spillways
- Type of dam: Gravity, roller-compacted concrete
- Impounds: Lancang (Mekong) River
- Height: 106 m (348 ft)

Reservoir
- Total capacity: 293,000,000 m^{3} (238,000 acre⋅ft)
- Catchment area: 92,600 km^{2} (35,800 mi^{2})

Power Station
- Commission date: 2019
- Type: Conventional
- Turbines: 4 x 225 MW Francis-type
- Installed capacity: 900 MW

The Dahuaqiao Dam is a gravity dam on the Lancang (upper Mekong) River in Lanping Bai and Pumi Autonomous County of Yunnan Province, China. The primary purpose of the dam is hydroelectric power generation. Construction began in 2010 and its 900 MW hydroelectric power station was fully operational as of 2019.

== See also ==
- Hydropower in the Mekong River Basin
- List of tallest dams in the world
- List of dams and reservoirs in China
- List of tallest dams in China
