= Buôn Kuốp Hydroelectric Power Station =

Hydroelectric power station in Daklak, Vietnam

Coordinates: 12.5761°N 107.9265°E

- Interactive map of Buôn Kuốp Hydroelectric Power Station
- Country: Vietnam
- Status: Operational

Buôn Kuốp Hydroelectric Power Station is a 280MW hydroelectric power plant on the Vietnamese section of the Srepok River in Đắk Lắk Province, Vietnam.

== See also ==
- List of power stations in Vietnam
