= Plew Trivisvavet =

Thai businessman

- ปลิว ตรีวิศวเวทย์
- Born: September 10, 1945 (age 79)
- Education: Osaka University (B.Sc, M.Sc)
- Known for: Founder of CH. Karnchang Public Company Limited
- Spouse: Saikasem Trivisvavet
- Children: Thanawat Trivisvavet; Supamas Trivisvavet; Nattavut Trivisvavet

Plew Trivisvavet (Thai: ปลิว ตรีวิศวเวทย์, born September 10, 1945) is a Thai businessman and chairman of the board of Bangkok Expressway and Metro. Trivisvavet founded CH. Karnchang Public Company Limited with his four brothers in 1972. He previously served as CEO and chairman of the board until 2015, when he was succeeded by his daughter Supamas Trivisvavet.

In 2015, Trivisvavet was ranked Thailand's 50th wealthiest person according to Forbes Thailand magazine, worth $425 million.

== Education ==
Trivisvavet attended Osaka University.

== Career ==
Trivisvavet oversaw the construction of the MRT Blue Line from Hua Lampong railway station to Thonburi.
