= Sa Thầy River =

River in Vietnam

Coordinates: 13.92447°N 107.45776°E

The Sa Thầy River (Vietnamese: Sông Sa Thầy) is a river of Vietnam. It is a tributary of the Se San River and flows through Kon Tum Province.
