= Xiaowan Dam =

- Location within China
- Official name: 小湾坝
- Coordinates: 24°42′11″N 100°05′31″E
- Status: Operational
- Construction began: 1 January 2002
- Opening date: March 2010
- Construction cost: US$3.9 billion

Dam and spillways
- Type of dam: Arch, double-curvature
- Height: 292 m (958 ft)
- Length: 902 m (2,959 ft)
- Elevation at crest: 1,245 m (4,085 ft)
- Width (crest): 13 m (43 ft)
- Width (base): 69 m (226 ft)
- Spillway type: Crest/tunnel
- Spillway capacity: 10,014 m^{3}/s (353,641 cu ft/s); Flood discharge (all outlets): 20,709 m^{3}/s (731,331 cu ft/s)

Reservoir
- Total capacity: 15,043,000,000 m^{3} (12,196,000 acre⋅ft)
- Active capacity: 9,895,000,000 m^{3} (8,022,000 acre⋅ft)
- Catchment area: 113,300 km^{2} (43,700 mi^{2})
- Surface area: 190 km^{2} (73 mi^{2})
- Normal elevation: 1,240 m (4,068 ft)

Power Station
- Operator: Huaneng
- Commission date: 2009-2010
- Hydraulic head: 251 m (823 ft) (max)
- Turbines: 6 × 700 MW Francis-type
- Installed capacity: 4,200 MW

The Xiaowan Dam (simplified Chinese: 小湾坝; traditional Chinese: 小灣壩; pinyin: Xiǎowān Bà) is an arch dam on the Lancang (Mekong) River in Nanjian County, Yunnan Province in southwest China. The primary purpose of the dam is hydroelectric power generation and it supports a 4,200 MW power station. Constructed between 2002 and 2010 by Huaneng Power International at a cost of ¥32 billion (nearly US$3.9 billion), it is the world's second highest arch dam at 292 m (958 ft). It is also third highest among dams of all types behind Jinping-I and Nurek and the third largest hydroelectric power station in China.

== Background ==
The feasibility study for the dam was completed in 1992, with it as part of the Lancang River Project. In 1995 the report was reviewed and approved by the Chinese government. Three years later in 1998, a consortium to fund and construct the dam was organized. In 1999, preliminary construction (roads, bridges, river diversion) began. Official construction on the dam started on 1 January 2002. The river was diverted by November 2003 and concrete pouring began in 2005. The river diversion was closed and the reservoir began to impound in November 2007. The first generator was commissioned in September 2009 and the dam was complete in March 2010. The last of the six generators went operational on 22 August 2010. The creation of the dam's reservoir submerged 55,678 ha (137,583 acres) of land and displaced 32,737 people.

== Specifications ==
The Xiaowan Dam is a 292 m (958 ft) tall and 902 m (2,959 ft) long double-curvature arch dam. Its crest is 13 m (43 ft) wide while the base sits at 69 m (226 ft) in width. The dam's crest is at an elevation of 1,245 m (4,085 ft) while the normal reservoir level is slightly lower at 1,240 m (4,068 ft). The dam's reservoir has a normal storage capacity of 15,043,000,000 m^{3} (12,196,000 acre⋅ft); of that capacity, 9,895,000,000 m^{3} (8,022,000 acre⋅ft) is active (or "useful") storage. The dam traps water from a catchment area covering 113,300 km^{2} (43,700 mi^{2}). The surface of the reservoir at normal level covers 190 km^{2} (73 mi^{2}).

Helping to control floods, the dam has two spillways, 5 gates near the crest and a tunnel on the left bank. The gates can discharge up to 5,130 m^{3}/s (181,164 cu ft/s) while the tunnel has a maximum discharge of 4,884 m^{3}/s (172,477 cu ft/s). In the middle portion of the dam, there are six orifice openings that can discharge 6,500 m^{3}/s (229,545 cu ft/s). In addition, the dam can release additional water and sediment with two bottom outlets. All of the dam's outlets including the power station give it a maximum flood discharge of 20,709 m^{3}/s (731,331 cu ft/s).

On the right bank of the dam is the power station intake which receives water into six 9.6 m (31 ft) diameter penstocks which each feed a 700 MW Francis turbine-turbine in the underground power station. The drop in elevation from the intake to the turbine affords a maximum hydraulic head of 251 m (823 ft). Once discharged by the turbine, the water is sent down one of two 18 m (59 ft) diameter tailrace tunnels towards the river.

== See also ==
- List of power stations in China
- List of tallest dams in the world
- List of tallest dams in China
- List of dams and reservoirs in China
