= Dachaoshan Dam =

Dam in Yunnan, China

- Location within China
- Country: China
- Location: Yunnan Province
- Coordinates: 24°01′28″N 100°22′09″E
- Status: In use
- Construction began: 1997
- Opening date: 2003
- Construction cost: RMB¥8.87 billion ($1.3 billion USD)
- Owners: Yunnan Dachaoshan Hydropower Co., Ltd.

Dam and spillways
- Type of dam: Gravity, roller-compacted concrete
- Impounds: Lancang (Mekong) River
- Height: 111 m (364 ft)
- Length: 460 m (1,509 ft)
- Dam volume: 1,126,700 m^{3} (39,789,035 ft^{3})
- Spillways: 5
- Spillway type: Controlled, crest overflow

Reservoir
- Creates: Dachaoshan Reservoir
- Total capacity: 940,000,000 m^{3} (762,070 acre⋅ft)
- Catchment area: 121,000 km^{2} (46,718 sq mi)

Power Station
- Commission date: 2001-2003
- Hydraulic head: 72.5 m (238 ft) (rated)
- Turbines: 6 x 225 MW
- Installed capacity: 1,350 MW
- Annual generation: 5931 GWh

The Dachaoshan Dam (Chinese: 大朝山大坝) is a gravity dam on the Lancang (Mekong) River in Yunnan Province, China. The sole purpose of the dam is hydroelectric power production as it supplies water to a power station containing six 225 MW generators for a total installed capacity of 1,350 MW.

== Background ==
Initial construction preparations on the dam began in 1993 before it was approved ready for construction in 1994. On August 4, 1997, the project was approved for construction commencement and on November 10, 1997, the river was diverted. Between 2001 and 2003, the dam was complete and all six generators went operational.

== Design ==
The dam is a 111 m (364 ft) tall and 460 m (1,509 ft) long gravity dam. It is composed of 1,126,700 m^{3} (39,789,035 ft^{3}) of concrete, 756,600 m^{3} (26,719,077 ft^{3}) is roller-compacted concrete. The reservoir created by the dam has a capacity of 940,000,000 m^{3} (762,070 acre⋅ft). To release water downstream, the dam has five 14 m (46 ft) x 17 m (56 ft) crest openings along with three mid-level openings and one bottom flushing outlet. With these openings, the design flood discharge capacity of the dam is 18,000 m^{3}/s (635,664 cu ft/s) while the maximum is 23,500 m^{3}/s (829,895 cu ft/s).

The dam's power station is underground and supplied with water via six 179.5 m (589 ft) long penstocks. Once through the six turbines, the water exits back to the river by means of two tailrace tunnels, one 1,355 m (4,446 ft) long and the other 1,248 m (4,094 ft).

== See also ==
- List of power stations in China

External image
- Front view the dam with crest spillway discharging
