= Thai Tap Water Supply =

- Company type: Public
- Traded as: SET: TTW
- Industry: Resources
- Founded: Thailand (September 11, 2000)
- Headquarters: Sam Phran, Nakhon Pathom, Thailand
- Area served: Nakhon Pathom, Samut Sakorn
- Products: Tap water
- Revenue: ▼5,513 million baht (2016)
- Net income: ▼2,476 million baht (2016)
- Total assets: ▼25,765 million baht (2016)
- Total equity: ▲11,493 million baht (2016)
- Parent: CH. Karnchang Public Company Limited
- Subsidiaries: Bangpa-In Industrial Estate (BIE), Pathum Thani Water (PTW)
- Website: www.ttwplc.com

Thai Tap Water Supply Public Company Limited (TTW) is tap water producer and distributor in Nakhon Pathom and Samut Sakorn areas for the Provincial Waterworks Authority (PWA), to replace tap water production from the PWA's groundwater wells and to increase tap water production volume to accommodate consumers demand so as to help alleviate land subsidence problems and saltwater penetration in accordance with the governmental policy. Pathum Thani Water Co., Ltd. (PTW), the company's subsidiary, is engaged in the same business in Pathum Thani Province.

== History ==
Thai Tap Water Supply was founded on 11 September 2000 with an initial registered capital of 100,000 baht. At the present the company has the registered capital of 3.99 billion baht.

On 22 May 2008, TTW was listed on the Stock Exchange of Thailand.
