= Yali Falls Dam =

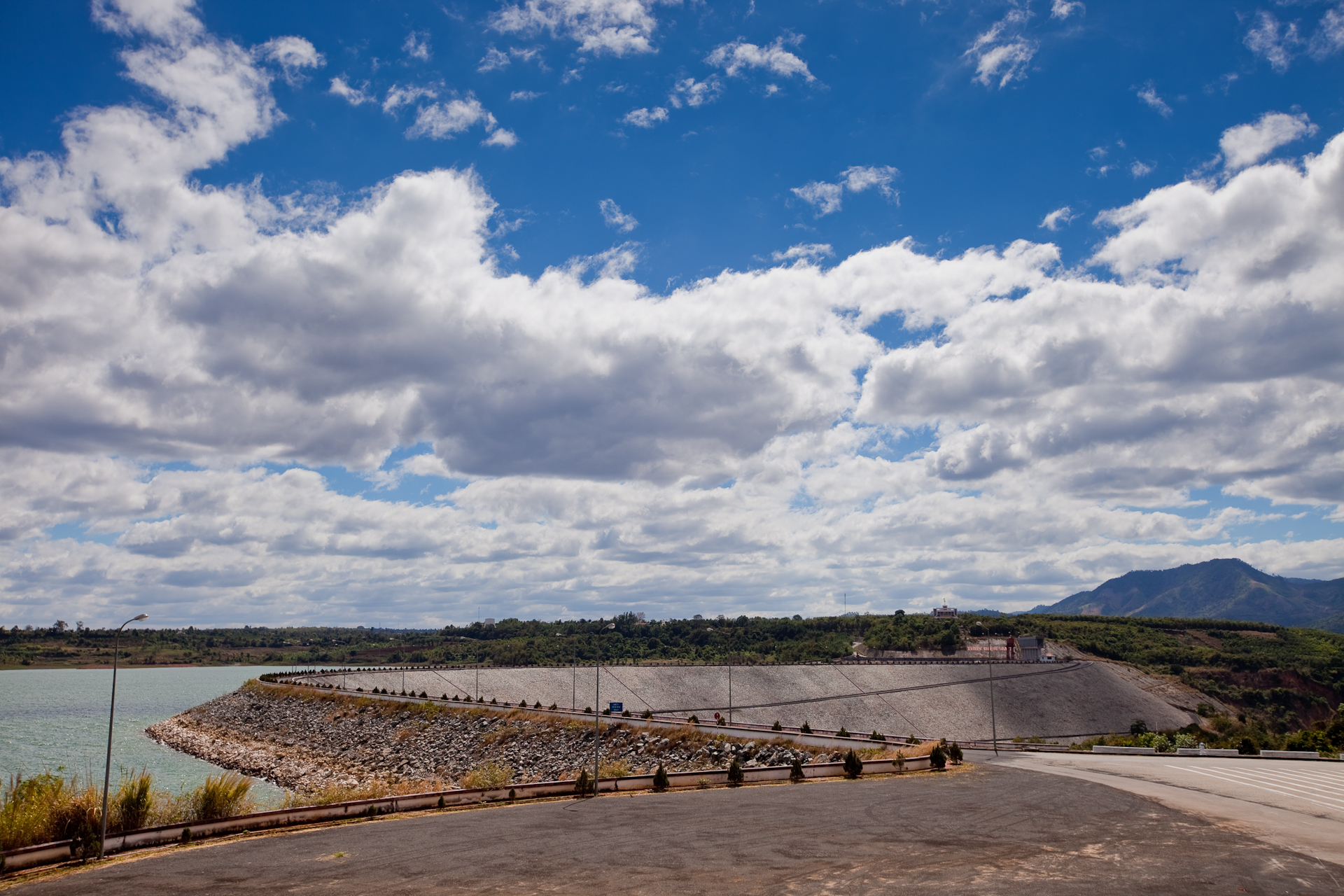

- Location within Vietnam
- Country: Vietnam
- Coordinates: 14.227°N 107.829°E
- Construction began: 1993
- Opening date: 1996

Dam and spillways
- Impounds: Krong Poko
- Height: 69 m (226 ft)

Reservoir
- Surface area: 64.5 km^{2} (24.9 sq mi)

Power Station
- Installed capacity: 720 MW

The Yali Falls Dam is the second largest dam in Vietnam, located in Gia Lai and Kon Tum provinces on the Krong Poko, a tributary of the Sesan River, in the Central Highlands of Vietnam, about 70 kilometres (43 mi) upstream of the Cambodian border. The 69-metre (226 ft)-high dam was begun in 1993 and sealed in 1996, with the 64.5 square kilometres (24.9 sq mi) reservoir filled by 1998. It aims to generate 720 MW of hydropower.

Like many large dam projects, it has been highly criticised, for causing flooding, damaging fisheries and for the lack of consultation with Cambodian authorities. Amongst those opposing the dam are the Sesan-Srepok-Sesong Protection Network (3SPN), organising 59 villages in northeast Cambodia to promote the environment in the three river basins and supported by Oxfam.
