= Houay Ho Dam =

Dam in Attapeu, Laos

Houay Ho
- Location within Laos
- Interactive map of Houay Ho
- Location: Attapeu Province, Laos
- Coordinates: 15°3′34″N 106°45′39″E
- Opening date: 1999
- Construction cost: US$243,000,000
- Owner: Houay Ho Power Co.

Dam and spillways
- Type of dam: Concrete Face Rockfill
- Impounds: Houay Ho River
- Height: 79 m (259 ft)

Reservoir
- Total capacity: 3.53 km^{3} (2,860,000 acre⋅ft)
- Catchment area: 192 km^{2} (74 mi^{2})
- Surface area: 37 km^{2} (14 mi^{2})

Power Station
- Operator: Houay Ho Power Co. Ltd (HHPC)
- Commission date: September 3, 1999
- Turbines: 2 x 75 MW and 1 x 2.1 MW.
- Installed capacity: 152.1 MW (204,000 hp)
- Annual generation: 450 GWh (1,600 TJ)
- Website http://www.houayho.com

The Houay Ho is a dam located in Samakkhixay District of Attapeu Province, Laos, 160 km (99 mi) east of Pakse and 30 km (19 mi) northwest of Attapeu. The project is considered the first privately financed joint venture 'build-operate-transfer' (BOT) hydropower project in Laos. It has installed capacity of 152.1 megawatts (204,000 hp), almost all of which is exported to Thailand.

== Design ==
The dam and plant design follow a format common to many dams in Laos (similar to, for example, the Nam Theun 2 Dam and the Nam Theun-Hinboun Dam), involving an inter-catchment water transfer, between the Houay Ho River, and a small tributary of the Xe Kong River, exploiting the altitudinal difference between the two to generate power.

The turbine array comprises two Francis Type turbines of 75 MW each, and a single Pelton Type turbine of 2.1 MW.

== History ==
The initial partnership involved in the development of this project comprised Daewoo E&C (60%), Électricité du Laos (20%) and Loxely PLC (20%), a Thai development firm. Construction started in 1993, with the development of a 26 km (16 mi) access road. The consortium was granted a 30-year BOT concession agreement from the Government of Laos to develop the hydroelectric resources of the Bolaven Plateau, hitherto untapped.

In September, 1993, the Houay Ho Power Company (HHPC) was established, with registered offices in Thailand, and the BOT agreement between the parties signed the same month (covering a period between 1999 and 2029); in June 1997, the Power Purchase Agreement (PPA) with the Electricity Generating Authority of Thailand (EGAT) was signed, and construction was completed in September 1999. Under the PPA, HHPC must supply 394.2 GWh annually, to Thailand. In 2007, the value of electricity sales from HHPC was US$23.51 million, and gross profit was US$13.2 million.

Year	Electricity supplied by Houay Ho Dam to EGAT, 2002-2007 (GWh)
2002	573
2003	423
2004	394
2005	420
2006	461
2007	473

Emerging from the 1997 Asian economic crisis, however, Daewoo E&C and Loxley, found themselves seriously weakened, indebted, and overextended, and both companies soon attempted to liquidate many of their overseas assets, including the Houay Ho Dam. In January 2002, Tractebel Electricity and Gas International, a Belgian firm, and a Thai firm, MCL, purchased 80% of Daewoo's and Loxely PLC's shares and debts for US$140 million, while the Lao Government retained the remainder. Tractabel is a subsidiary of GDF Suez. A syndicate of Thai banks provided financing, and the Belgian Export Credit Agency (ONDD), provided political coverage in support of Tractebel.

In January, 2002, the dam's ownership changed once again with the purchase of 60% of its shares by GDF Suez; and then again in May 2009, with the purchase of 67% of the company's shares by GDF subsidiary, Glow Energy. The company, in addition to its Thai-registered offices, now has offices in Vientiane, Laos. Its current ownership configuration comprises Glow Energy (67.25%), Électricité du Laos (20%), and Hemaraj Land & Development (12.75%). The Glow Energy and Hemaraj Land & Development have a close association, with other joint ventures in the energy sector, based in Thailand. The company is Thailand's third largest energy producer, and supplies some 7-8% of the country's electricity.

== Controversies ==
In 2004, a Belgian NGO, Proyecto Gato, a Belgian NGO, filed a complaint under the OECD's Guidelines for Multinational Enterprises, arguing that Tractebel should be held responsible for adequate compensation to the people forced to move to make way for the dam. Around 3,000 people from 12 villages were forcibly evicted to make way for the Houay Ho Dam, because they lived in the watershed area. Proyecto Gato also asked Tractebel to make basic health care, educational equipment and medicine available to the resettled villagers.

In April 1994, the project developer (Daewoo) conducted the pre-feasibility study noting the major environmental and social impacts of the project and suggesting possible mitigation measures. Statistics on socio-economic conditions were, however, too general for planning and it appears that no information was gathered from the impacted villages or the surrounding areas. The Preliminary Environmental Impact Assessment (EIA) also recommended a Resettlement Plan, watershed management and environmental monitoring. Only the first recommendation was followed up by the Government of Laos. Irrespective, a key problem in all of this was that the Preliminary EIA was conducted only after construction of the dam had begun.

The Preliminary EIA recommended two villages for relocation: the first was Ban Thang Ngao due to the expected loss of its fisheries; and Ban Nam Han due to inundation. When the resettlement plan was implemented, however, it deviated substantially from the recommendations of the Houay Ho EIA. Ultimately, all villages in the Houay Ho catchment area, together with all of those in the catchment of the adjacent proposed Xe Pian-Xe Namnoy hydropower scheme (which Glow also has an interest in), were relocated to a resettlement site at Houay Kong in Pakxong District, some 30 km (19 mi) west of the dam. In part, this was because of Lao Government 'Focal Zone development strategies', which combine the aims of reducing Swidden agriculture with the relocation of villages to the proximity of roads to provide services and to promote 'national integration' (most of the people relocated belong to minority ethnic groups). The Pakxong District Focal Zone came into effect after the project had already been designed and it would appear that the provincial government attempted to utilize project funds for establishing coffee plantations on the Bolaven Plateau. The Provincial Rural Development Committee drew up a Resettlement Action Plan outlining major strategies for relocation, land allocation, infrastructure and service improvements and the promotion of coffee production, utilizing approximately 57 percent of the Rural Development Funds for the whole province.

Twelve Nya Heun villages were relocated into an area adjacent to Lavaen villages. The mixing of these ethnic groups created tension and conflict over land. The Nya Heun is a very small ethnic group (4,200) and have been classified as ‘vulnerable’ due to their small population, relative isolation and dependence on forestry resources for subsistence. Relocating them outside their traditional forests has had a significant negative impact on their culture and traditional way of life. The consultation process was weak and involved discussions with only their leaders – most people did not want to relocate and leave their homes unnecessarily. Inadequate funds and planning resulted in food shortages that were only remedied by food donations by an international NGO. There was inadequate provisions for potable water and capacity building for local authorities, and an over-reliance on cash compensation, cash crop production and providing services and infrastructure. Despite the recommendations of the EIA consultants and the fact that livestock rearing has been a key element of their livelihood systems, no provision for livestock or grazing areas were made at the new resettlement sites, in the hope that villagers would sell off their animals. Animals remain in the catchment area near original villages.

In addition to these apparent resettlement deficiencies, the release of turbinated water into the Xe Kong River has led to the drying up of the Houay Ho River for some 4 km (2.5 mi) downstream of the dam. The village of Ban Than Ngao, about 8 km (5.0 mi) down-stream has been severely impacted by the loss of water and fishing opportunities.

Houay Ho was funded using balance sheet financing, meaning that the investor (Daewoo) was able to finance the entire project from existing fund reserves and/or credit lines. This allowed for a very short preparatory phase, during which time construction actually commenced on the basis of incomplete and uncertain technical, environmental and financial information. As a consequence, the project provides the Government of Laos with less foreign exchange earnings than had been initially anticipated, while placing the onus of resettlement and compensation on the Government.

A final criticism of the project was (and remains) the lack of transparency in its planning and subsequent environmental and social programs. Its EIA remains unavailable to public scrutiny.

The Belgian national contact point for the OECD Guidelines for Multinational Enterprises, in its consideration of the complaint brought by Projecto Gato against Tractebel, concluded that Tractebel could not be held responsible for the deficiencies and oversights of the project's previous owners. The fate of villagers moved from the Houay Ho's catchment area is currently unclear. Tractebel, in an apparent effort to improve its image, responded soon after this decision by supporting repairs to the old school in the resettlement area, and the construction of a new school valued at US$30,000. The company also refurbished the health center in the resettlement area and the 3.5 km (2.2 mi) road between Houay Kong Village and the resettlement site, at a cost of US$50,000. Finally, Tractebel fixed the broken wells in the resettlement area and constructed six toilets in six villages, at a total cost of US$15,600.

== See also ==
- Mekong
- Mekong River Basin Hydropower
