= Nuozhadu Dam =

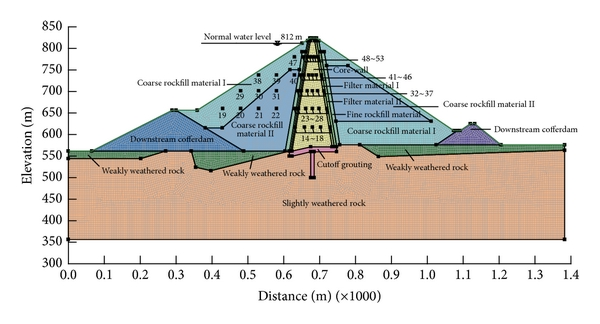
- 2D finite element meshes and measure points of Nuozhadu dam

- Location within China
- Location: Puer, Yunnan Province
- Coordinates: 22°39′22″N 100°25′06″E
- Status: Operational
- Construction began: 2004
- Opening date: 2012

Dam and spillways
- Type of dam: Embankment, central core, rock-fill
- Impounds: Lancang (Mekong) River
- Height: 261.5 m (858 ft)
- Length: 608 m (1,995 ft)
- Width (crest): 18 m (59 ft)
- Spillway type: Service, controlled side channel chute
- Spillway capacity: 31,318 m^{3}/s (1,106,000 cu ft/s)

Reservoir
- Creates: Nuozhadu Reservoir
- Total capacity: 21,749,000,000 m^{3} (17,632,000 acre⋅ft)
- Catchment area: 140,000 km^{2} (54,000 sq mi)
- Surface area: 320 km^{2} (120 sq mi)

Power Station
- Commission date: 2012-2014
- Hydraulic head: 187 m (614 ft)
- Turbines: 9 x 650 MW Francis-type
- Installed capacity: 5,850 MW
- Annual generation: 23,9 TWh

Nuozhadu Dam (Chinese: 糯扎渡大坝; pinyin: Nuòzhādù Dàbà) is an embankment dam on the Lancang (Mekong) River in Yunnan Province in southwest China. The dam is 261.5 m (858 ft) tall, and creates a reservoir with a normal capacity of 21,749,000,000 m^{3} (17,632,000 acre⋅ft) at a level of 812 m (2,664 ft) asl. The purpose of the dam is hydroelectric power production along with flood control and navigation. The dam supports a power station with nine generators, each with generating capacity of 650 MW. The total generating capacity of the power station is 5,850 MW. Construction on the project began in 2004; the dam's first generator went online 6 September 2012 and the last generator was commissioned in June 2014. The construction and management of the project was implemented by Huaneng Power International Ltd., which has a concession to build, own and operate hydroelectric dams on China's stretch of the Mekong River.

== See also ==
- List of power stations in China
- List of tallest dams in the world
- List of tallest dams in China
- List of dams and reservoirs in China
