= Jinghong Dam =

Dam in Jinghong, Yunnan, China

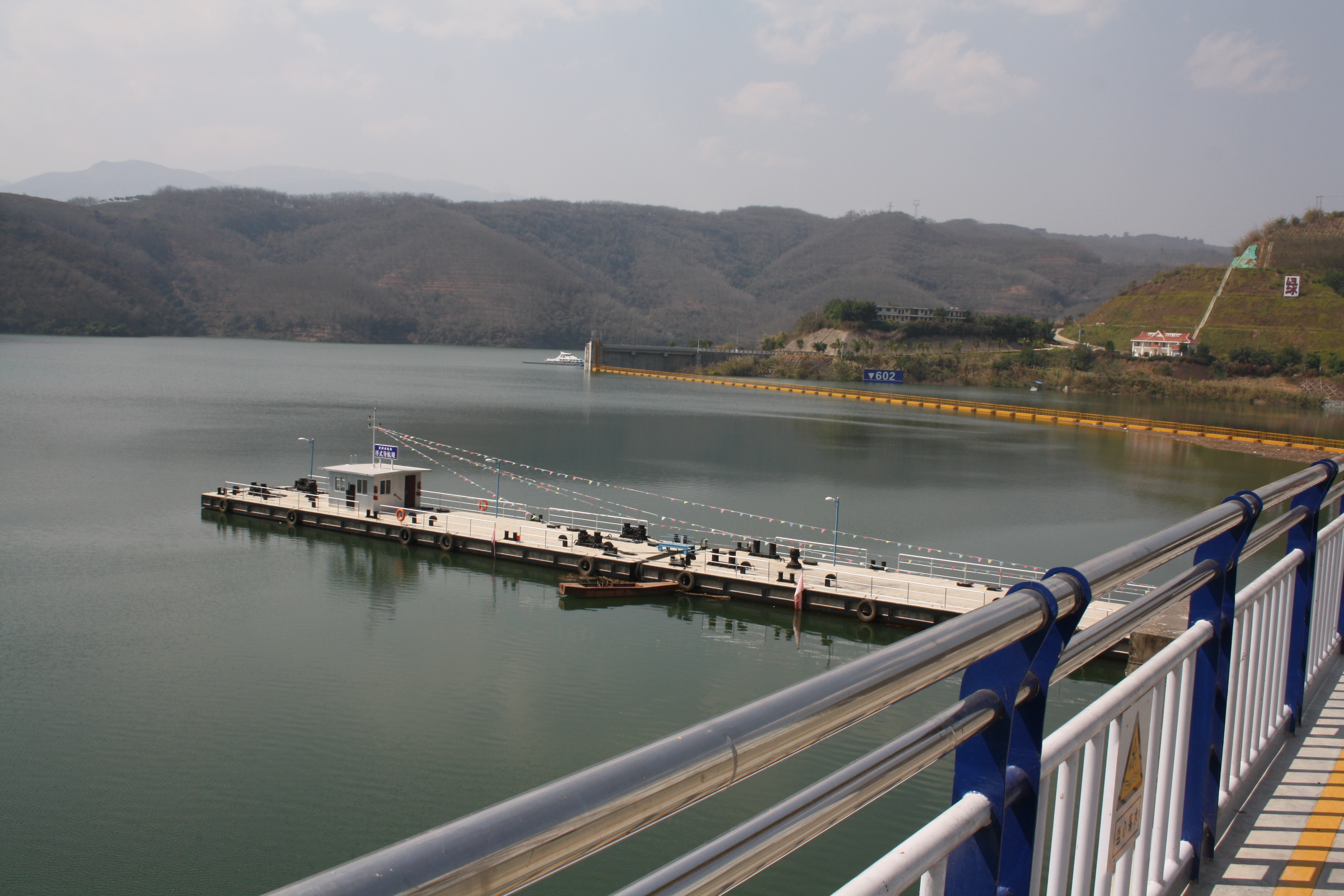

- Location within China
- Official name: 景洪大坝
- Country: China
- Location: Jinghong, Yunnan Province
- Coordinates: 22°03′09″N 100°45′58″E
- Status: In use
- Construction began: 2003
- Opening date: 2008
- Construction cost: 2.3 billion yuan (US$ 1.76 billion)

Dam and spillways
- Type of dam: Gravity, roller-compacted concrete
- Impounds: Lancang (Mekong) River
- Height: 108 m (354 ft)
- Length: 704.5 m (2,311 ft)

Reservoir
- Creates: Jinghong Reservoir
- Total capacity: 249,000,000 m^{3} (201,868 acre⋅ft)
- Surface area: 510 km^{2} (197 sq mi)

Power Station
- Commission date: 2008-2010
- Installed capacity: 1,750 MW

The Jinghong Dam (Chinese: 景洪大坝) is a gravity dam composed of roller-compacted concrete on the Lancang (Mekong) River near Jinghong in Yunnan Province, China. The main purpose of the dam is hydroelectric power production and it has an associated 1,750 MW power station. Part of the power generated is sold to Thailand under an agreement with China.

As of January 2020 it is the nearest Chinese dam upstream of the Thai border, and has helped to cause huge fluctuations in river levels, affecting people's livelihoods downstream by disrupting the river's natural cycle. It, along with the many other dams on the river, is exacerbating the effects of climate change and impacting the ecosystem, disturbing the migratory patterns of fish as well as riverbank plants and local agriculture downstream.

== See also ==
- List of power stations in China
