= Manwan Dam =

- Interactive map of Manwan Dam
- Official name: 漫灣大壩
- Location: Mekong, China
- Coordinates: 24°37′20″N 100°26′56″E
- Construction began: 1986
- Opening date: 1995

Dam and spillways
- Type of dam: Gravity
- Impounds: Mekong River
- Height: 132 m (433 ft)

Reservoir
- Total capacity: 920,000,000 m^{3} (745,856 acre⋅ft)

Power Station
- Installed capacity: 1,570 MW

The Manwan Dam (simplified Chinese: 漫湾大坝; traditional Chinese: 漫灣大壩; pinyin: Mànwān Dàbà) is a large hydroelectric dam in China. It is built on the Mekong (Lancang) River with a capacity of 1,570 MW.

== See also ==
- List of power stations in China
