= Lower Se San 2 Dam =

Dam in Stung Treng, Cambodia

- Location within Cambodia
- Country: Cambodia
- Location: 25 km (16 mi) upstream from Stung Treng
- Coordinates: 13°32′59.5″N 106°15′49.4″E
- Status: Completed
- Construction began: 2014
- Opening date: December 2018
- Construction cost: US$781.52 million
- Owners: Royal Group; Hydrolancang International Energy

Dam and spillways
- Type of dam: Reservoir
- Impounds: Sesan River
- Height: 75 m (246 ft)
- Length: 7,729 m (25,358 ft)

Reservoir
- Total capacity: 1,790,000 m^{3} (63,000,000 cu ft)
- Surface area: 75 km^{2} (29 sq mi)

Power Station
- Operator: Hydro Power Lower Sesan 2 Co. Ltd.
- Turbines: 5 X 80 MW (110,000 hp)
- Installed capacity: 400 MW (540,000 hp) (max. planned)
- Annual generation: 1,998 GWh (7,190 TJ)
- Website http://www.hydrosesan2.com

The Lower Se San 2 Dam (also: Lower Sesan 2 Dam and Han Se San 2 Dam) is a hydroelectric dam on the Se San River in Stung Treng Province, northeastern Cambodia. The Se San River is a major tributary of the Mekong River. The dam site is located 25 kilometres (16 mi) east of the provincial capital, also named Stung Treng. The first turbine began producing electricity in November 2017. The dam was officially opened on December 18, 2018.

== History ==
The Lower Sesan 2 (LSS2) was first envisaged in a 1999 study funded by the Asian Development Bank, in which it was deemed an unattractive investment due to its marginal financial viability and its large potential environmental impact. Nevertheless, a memorandum of understanding between Cambodia's Ministry of Mines and Energy and Vietnam Electricity was signed in 2007 to carry out a detailed feasibility study. In January 2011, the Vietnamese Ministry of Planning and Investment licensed Vietnam Electricity to make a US$816 million investment in the project. The Cambodian government approved the project on 2 November 2012. That same year, EVN withdrew from the project, although it retained a 10% stake in the project. On 26 November 2012, an agreement on the dam's construction was signed between the Royal Group of Cambodia and China's Hydrolancang International Energy, a subsidiary of China Huaneng Group.

== Description ==
The project was built by the Hydro Power Lower Sesan 2 Co. Ltd., a joint company of the Royal Group of Cambodia and Hydrolancang International Energy. Vietnam Electricity holds a 10% nominal stake in the project. After 40 years of operation, the dam's ownership will be transferred to the government. The power plant will have a capacity of 400 megawatts (540,000 hp) with an average output of 1,998 gigawatt-hours (7,190 TJ) per year. It will have five turbines of 80 MW each. The dam is expected to cost US$781 million.

== Impact ==
According to the environmental impact assessment, the dam's reservoir is expected to inundate numerous villages upstream from the dam, which will force the relocation of thousands of villagers, many of whom have lived on or near the banks of the Se San River for generations. Both upstream and downstream, the effects of the dam are expected to drastically reduce the fishery resources on which many thousands more villagers depend for food and income. The effects will likely be felt as far away as the Tonlé Sap Lake.

Both the Sesan and Srepok rivers originate in Vietnam's central highlands before flowing through Stung Treng and Ratanakiri (and Mondulkiri) provinces in northeast Cambodia, making hydropower development along these two Mekong tributaries an international and transboundary concern.

Up to 2,000 people will be displaced. At least 38,675 people, including a large number of indigenous peoples, included in at least 86 villages located along the Sesan and Srepok Rivers and in the reservoir area would lose access to the vast majority of their fisheries resources due to the dam blocking fish migrations from the Mekong and Sekong Rivers up the Sesan and Srepok Rivers. In addition, at least 87 villages in Cambodia located along tributaries of these two rivers would also lose access to migratory fish. In total, at least 78,000 people living above the Sesan 2 dam site are expected to lose access to migratory fish.

== See also ==
- Energy in Cambodia
- Mekong
- Mekong River Commission
