= Srepok River =

River in Vietnam

The Srepok River (Khmer: ទន្លេស្រែពក, Tônlé Srêpôk; Yagrai: Eă Srêpôkô; Vietnamese: Sông Srêpốk) is a major tributary of the Mekong River.

== Geography ==
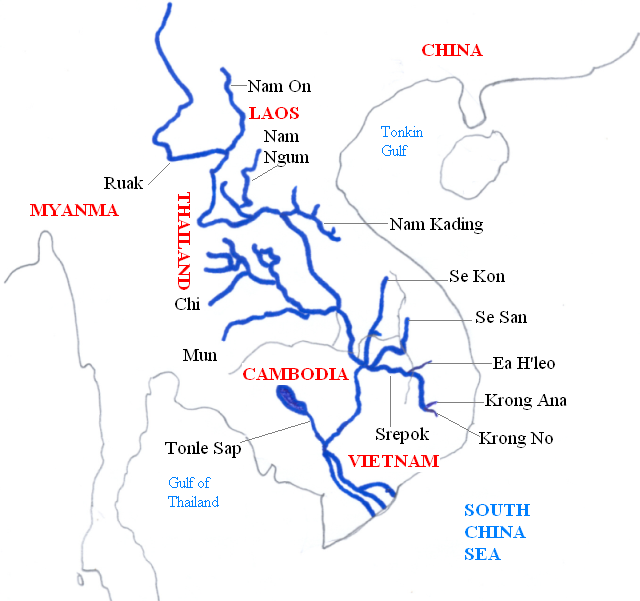
Location of the Srepok River in Indochina peninsula

Srepok River runs from Đắk Lắk Province in the Central Highlands of Vietnam through the Ratanakiri and Stung Treng provinces in Cambodia to join the Mekong near Stung Treng town. Its length is 405 km in which the last 281 km course is in Cambodian territory.

The Srepok River, in turn, has contained two main tributaries, the Krông Nô ("brother river") and Krông Ana ("sister river") streams. In Vietnam, it is also called the Daăk Krông, which means "the big river".

== Course ==
Forming from two tributaries—Krông Nô and Krông Ana rivers in the western side of the South Annamite Mountain Range in Vietnam's Central Highlands province of Đắk Lắk—the Srepok runs through Krông Ana, Buôn Đôn, and Ea Súp districts to the west. Just entering the territory of Cambodia, the Srepok is joined by the Ea H'leo and Ia Drang rivers. In Cambodia, it runs through the Ratanakiri and Stung Treng provinces. In Stung Treng, it enters the Tonlé San River, just 23 miles upstream from the confluence where the Tonlé San joins the Mekong.

The Lower Se San 2 Dam was recently built at the confluence of the Srepok and Tonlé San rivers.

The river's course from the confluence of Krông Nô and Krông Ana rivers to the Vietnam–Cambodia border is approximately 126 km. From the border to Stung Treng is about 281 km.

== Usage ==
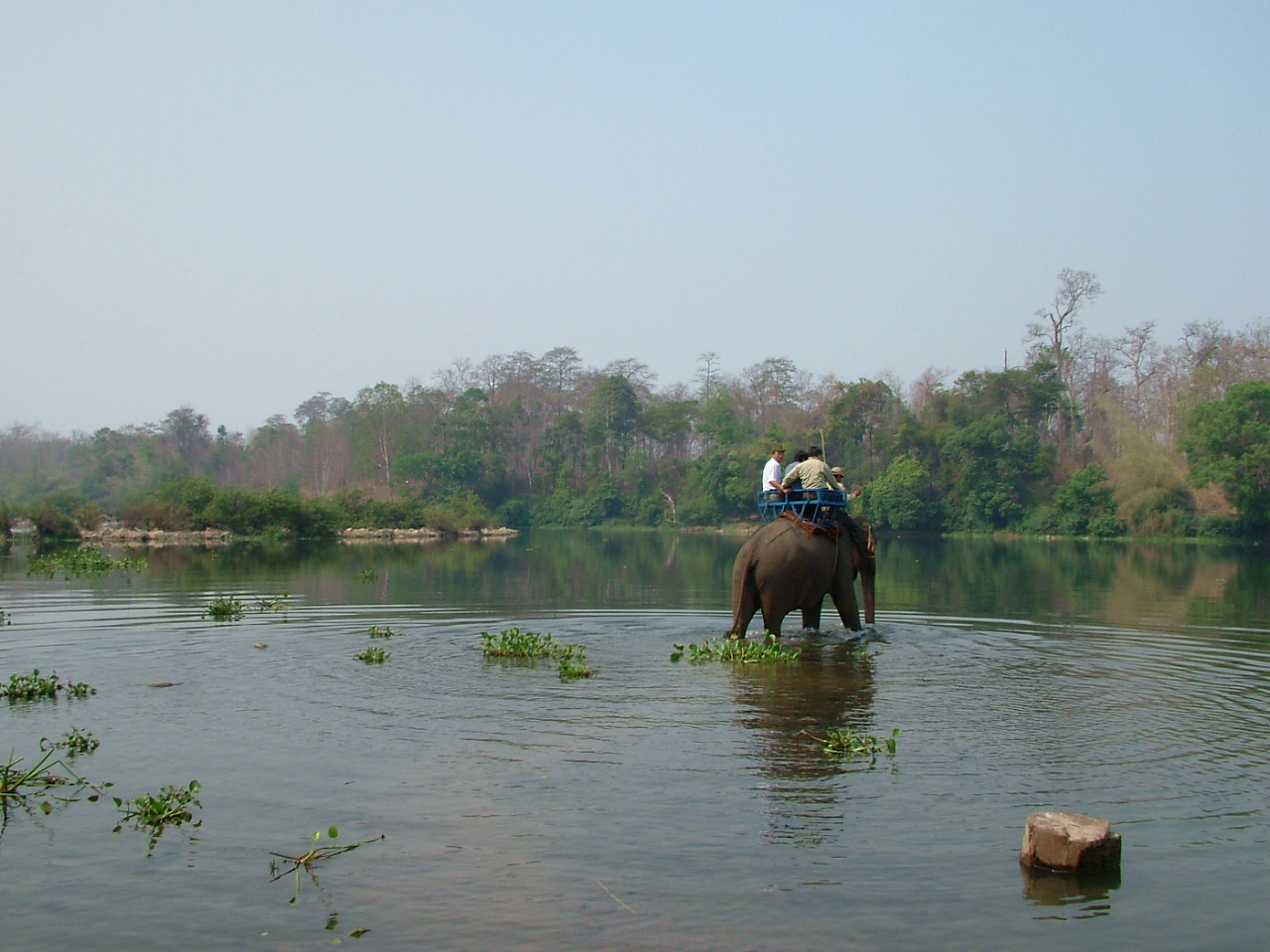
Srepok River at Bản Đôn, Buôn Đôn, Đắk Lắk, Vietnam

In the late 19th century, when road infrastructure was underdeveloped, Srepok River was a crucial water transport route between Vietnam's Central Highlands and Cambodia and Laos. Lao people and Khmer people went to the upstream by boats to exercise trading with people there. Ban Don (Buôn Đôn, Đắk Lắk, Vietnam) once was a busy river port town. Lao people came and inhabited in Stung Treng as well as Ban Don and considerably contributed to Ban Don's special culture features.

Historically, the river was a natural divider between Western and South-Central Bahnaric-speaking people.

== See also ==
- Đồng Nai River
- Pa River
- Se San River
