= Tonlé San =

River in Vietnam and Cambodia

Tonlé San Ya Krong Po Ko
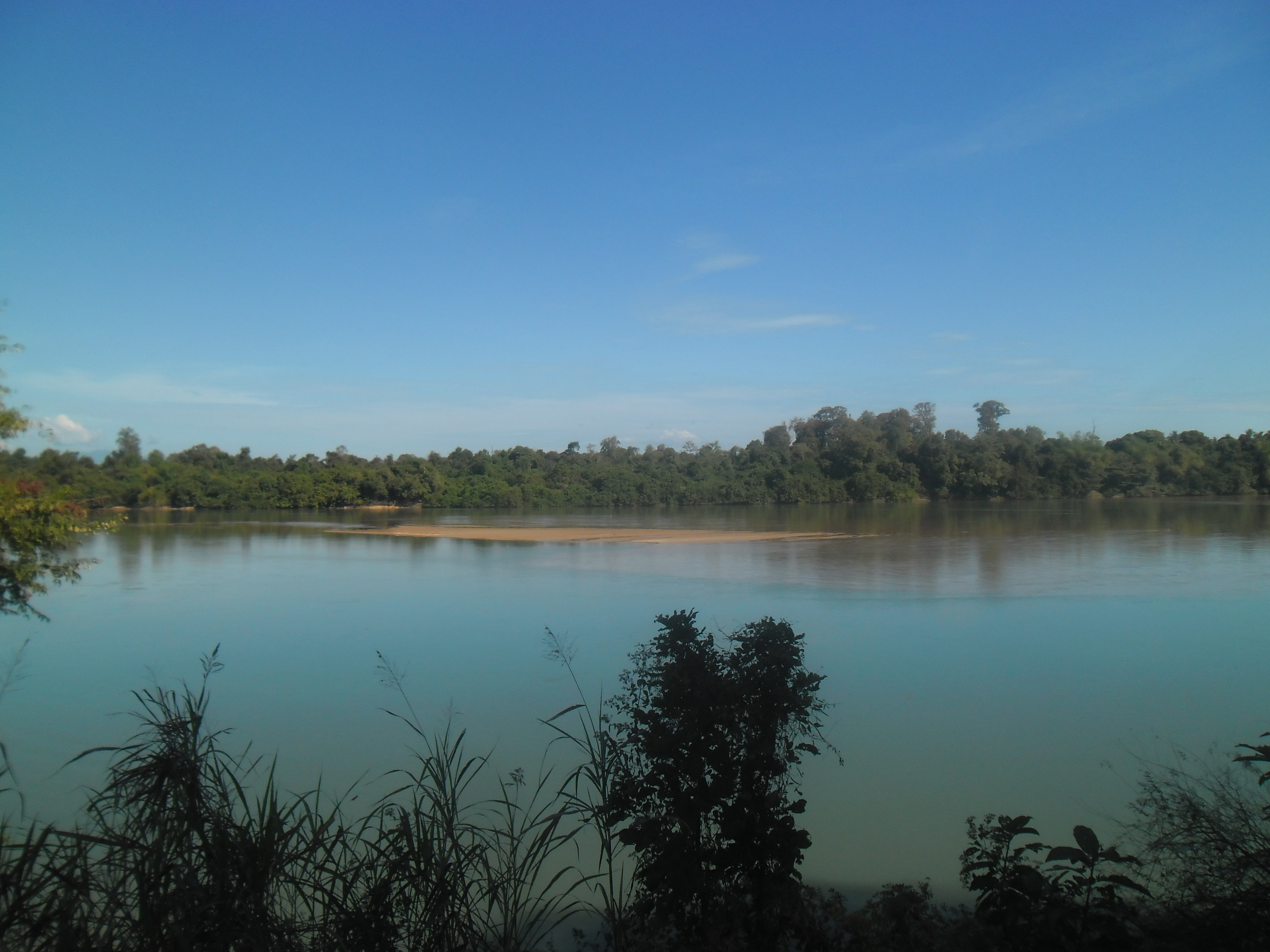
- Tonlé San
- Native name: ទន្លេសាន (Khmer); Sông Sê San (Vietnamese)

Location
- Country: Vietnam, Cambodia

Physical characteristics
- Source
  - location: confluence of Dak Psi and Dak Po Ko
  - coordinates: 14.6063°N 107.8404°E
- Mouth
  - location: Mekong
  - coordinates: 13.536°N 105.965°E
- Basin size: 17,000 km^{2} (6,600 sq mi)

Basin features
- Progression: Tonlé San—Mekong—Mekong Delta—South China Sea

The Tonlé San (Khmer: ទន្លេសាន, Tônlé San), also known as the Sesan River (Vietnamese: Sông Sê San), is a river that flows through central Vietnam and north-east Cambodia. It is a major tributary of the Mekong River. Its tributaries include the Dak Bla, Dakpsy, Sa Thầy and Lagrai rivers. A short portion of the river forms a part of the international border between Cambodia and Vietnam.

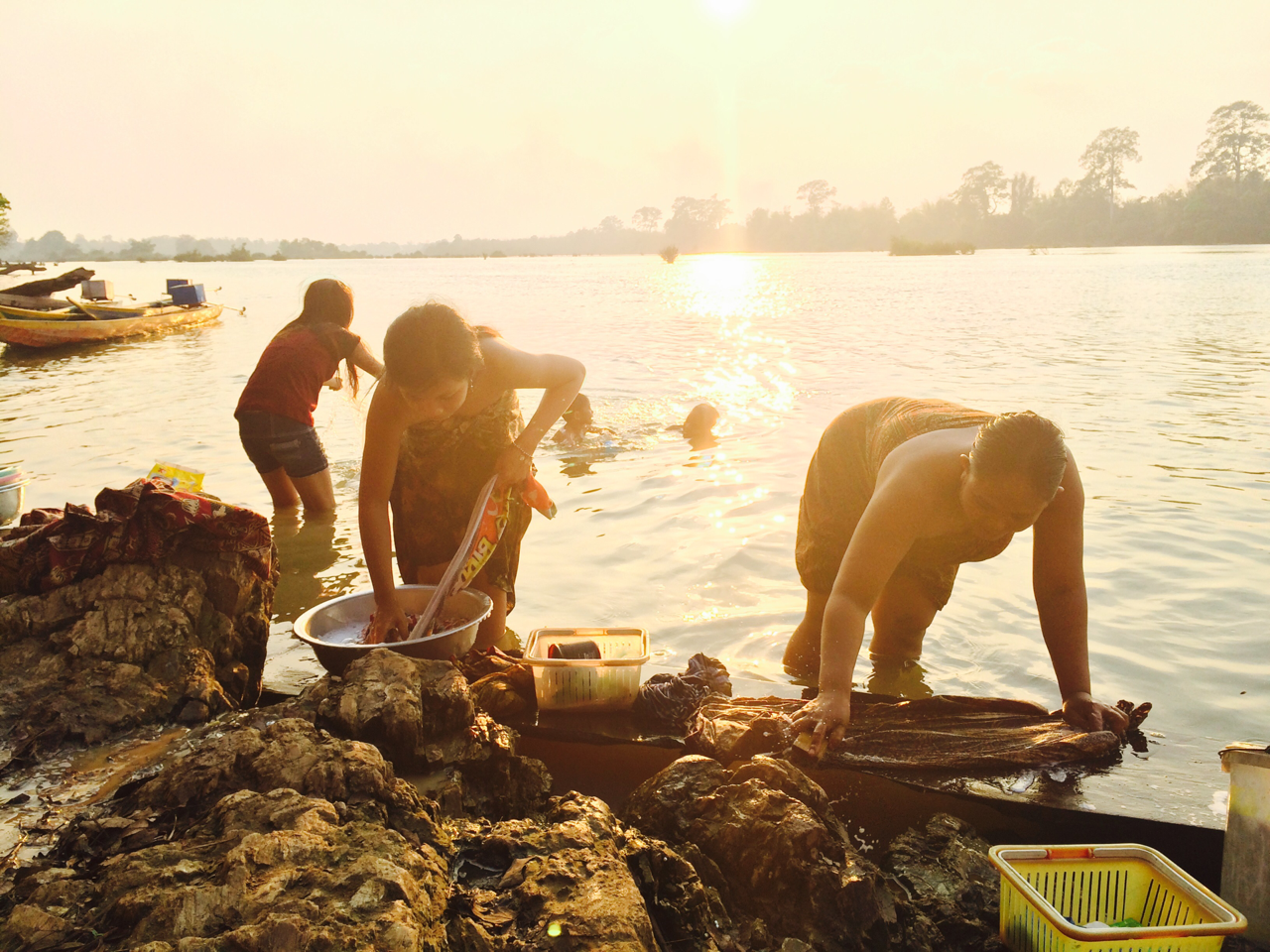
Women in Sesan district wash their clothes in the Tonle Sesan, the major tributary of the Mekong River that flows through Cambodia.

There are a number of hydropower dams on the Se San River and its tributaries. Where it joins the Srepok River in the Lower Se San 2 Dam. Upstream is the dam cascade: Se San 4A, Se San 4, Se San 3A, Se San 3, Yali Falls. On the Dak Po Ko River is the Plei Krông dam. There are also several dams on tributaries of the Dak Bla, including the Dak Snghé, tributary of the Dak Bla, is the Upper Kontum dam and hydropower plant, which discharges into the Tra Khuc River, and the Dak Doa.
