= Xayaburi Dam =

Dam in Xayaburi, Laos

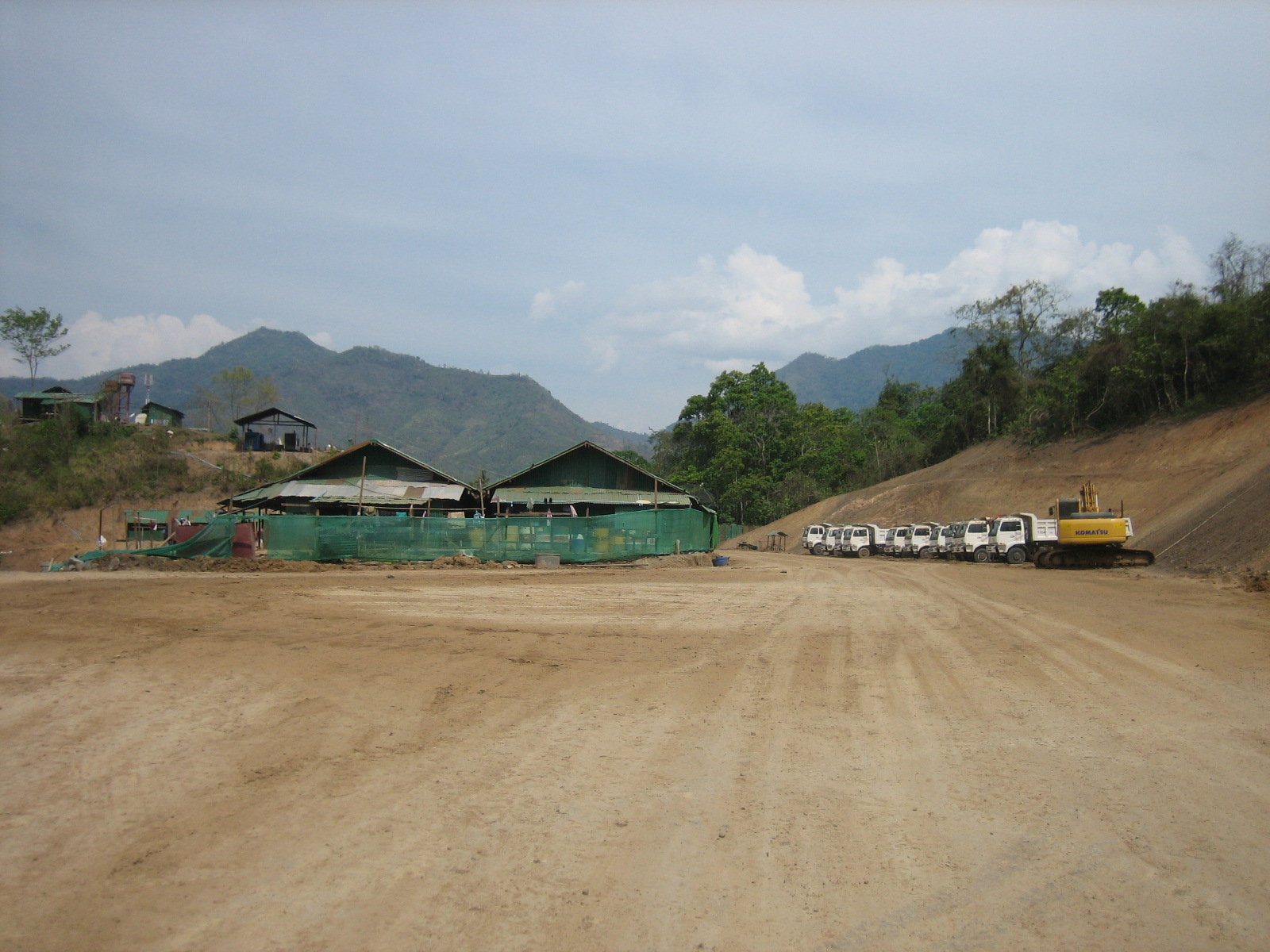

- Location within Laos
- Country: Laos
- Location: Xayaburi
- Coordinates: 19°14′34.4″N 101°49′06.4″E
- Status: Operational
- Construction began: 2012
- Opening date: October 2019
- Construction cost: US$3.8 billion
- Owner: Xayaburi Power Company Limited

Dam and spillways
- Type of dam: Run-of-river concrete barrage
- Impounds: Mekong
- Height: 32.6 m (107 ft)
- Length: 820 m (2,690 ft)
- Spillway type: 10 x radial gates
- Spillway capacity: 3,980 m^{3}/s (141,000 cu ft/s)

Reservoir
- Total capacity: 1.3 km^{3} (1,100,000 acre⋅ft)
- Catchment area: 272,000 km^{2} (105,000 sq mi)
- Surface area: 49 km^{2} (19 sq mi)

Power Station
- Operator: Xayaburi Power Company Limited
- Hydraulic head: 18 m (59 ft) (rated)
- Turbines: EDL: 1 × 60 MW; EGAT: 7 x 175 MW
- Installed capacity: 1,285 MW
- Annual generation: 7,370 GWh
- Website www.xayaburi.com/index_eng.aspx

The Xayaburi Dam is a run-of-river hydroelectric dam on the Lower Mekong River, approximately 30 kilometres (19 mi) east of the town of Sainyabuli (Xayaburi) in northern Laos. Commercial operation of the dam started in October 2019. The main purpose of the dam is to produce hydroelectric power, 95% of which is to be purchased by the Electricity Generating Authority of Thailand (EGAT). The project is surrounded in controversy due to complaints from downstream riparians and environmentalists. Preliminary construction began in early-2012, but work on the dam itself was suspended shortly thereafter due to complaints from Cambodia and Vietnam downstream. After making modifications to the dam's design, Laos started construction with a ceremony on 7 November 2012. The Xayaburi Dam is the first of the 11 dams planned on the lower Mekong.

== History ==
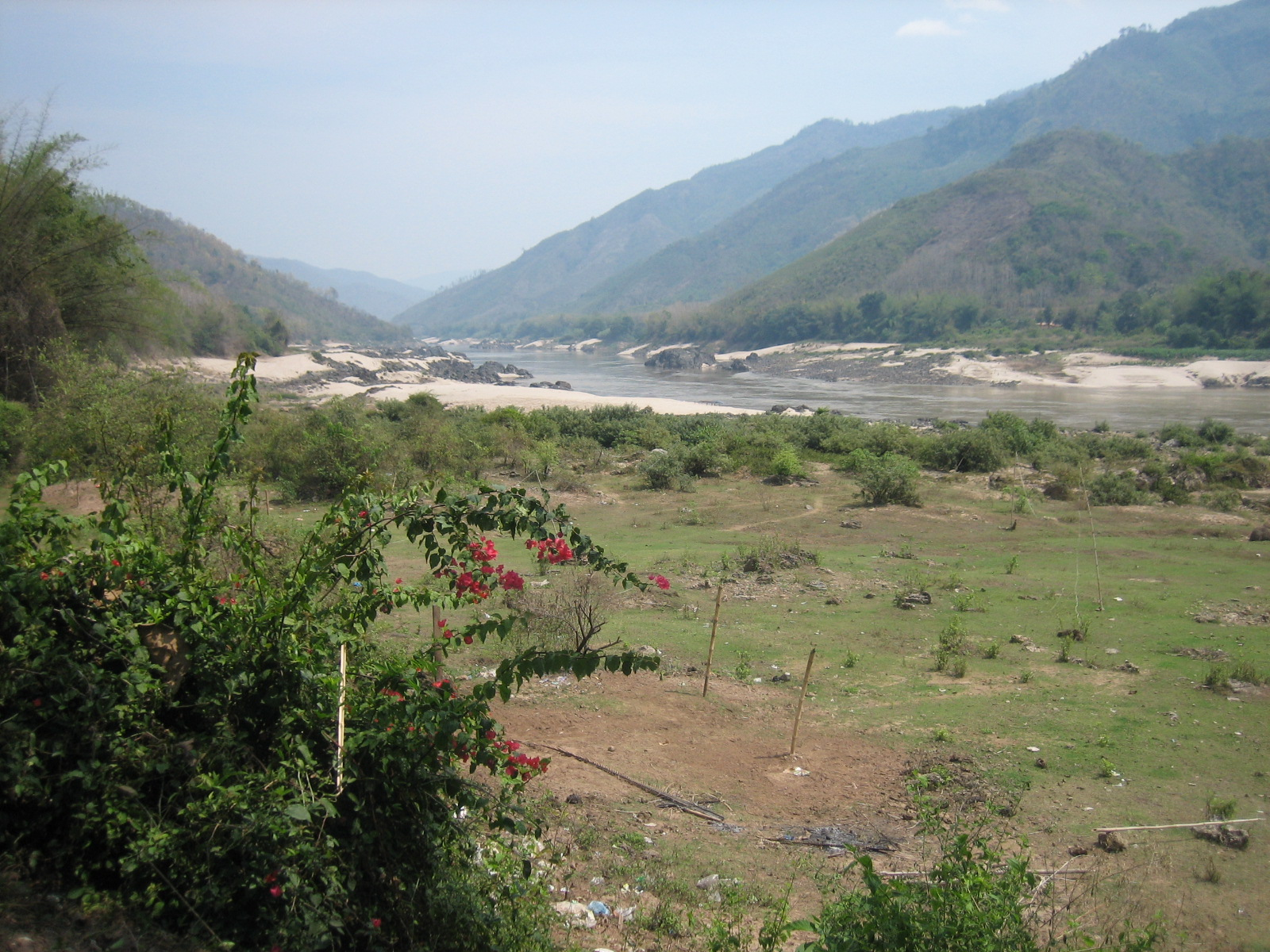
Site terrain

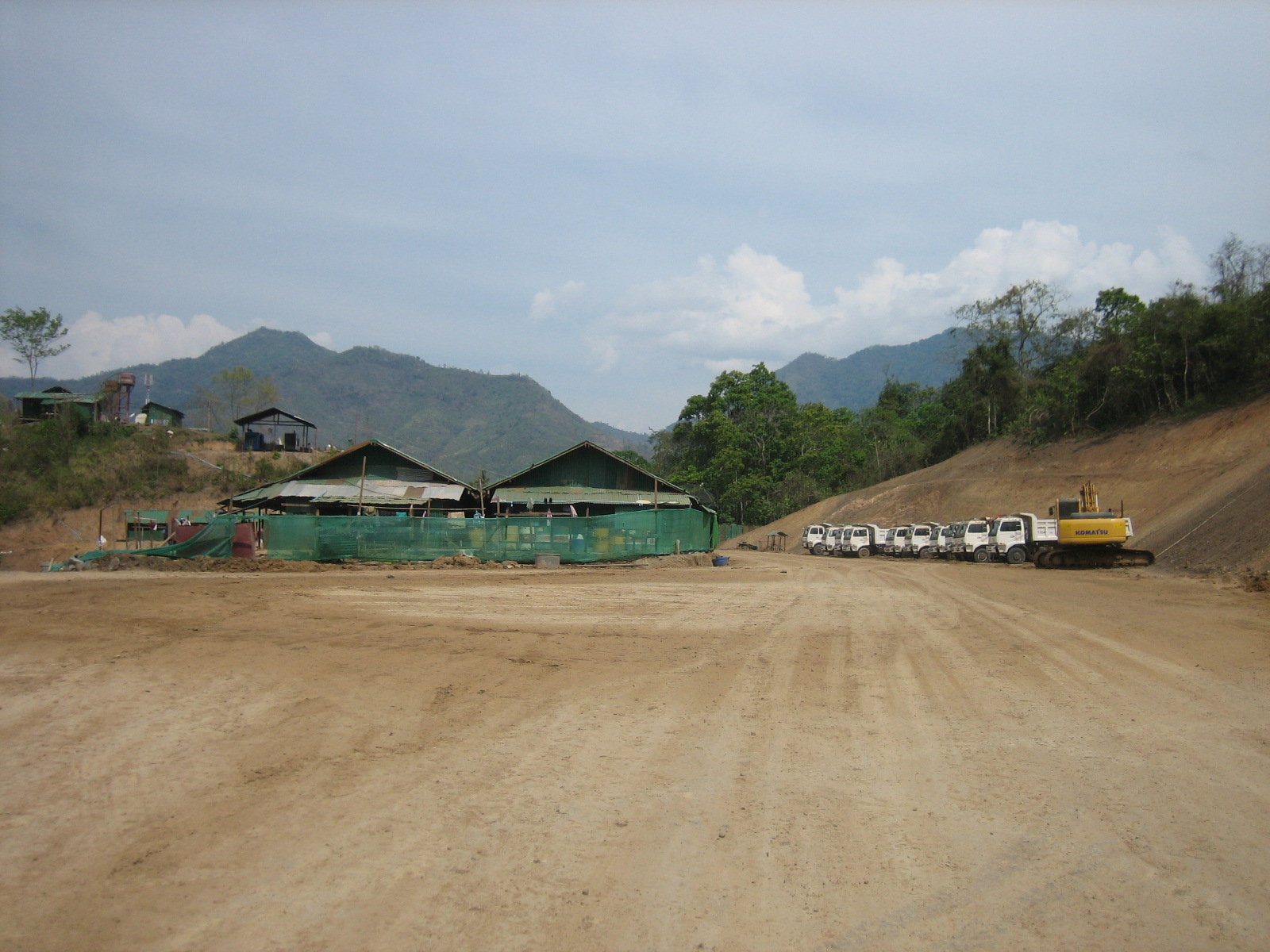
Construction site

On 4 May 2007, the Lao government signed a memorandum of understanding with Thailand's CH. Karnchang Public Company Limited for the development of this hydropower project. The formal project development agreement followed in November 2008, and a feasibility study was conducted that same year by Swiss-based AF Colenco and Thai TEAM consultants. The environmental impact assessment was submitted in February 2010. In July 2010, a memorandum of understanding for power purchase was signed by EGAT and the Lao government.

According to the 1995 Mekong Agreement, the project is subject to the Mekong River Commission (MRC) Procedures for Notification, Prior Consultation, and Agreement. Under this agreement, the project's host country must notify the governments of the other signatories, namely Cambodia, Thailand, and Vietnam. The process was initiated in September 2010. It is the first project initiated through a regional decision-making process.

On 19 April 2011, the MRC Joint Committee announced that the MRC countries could not reach a consensus on how to proceed with the project, and agreed that a decision on the prior consultation process be tabled for consideration at the ministerial level. However, in June 2011, the Laos Government gave the Thai developer CH. Karnchang the go-ahead to resume work on the Xayaburi Dam, informing the company that the Mekong River Commission's decision-making process was completed. Prashanth Parameswaran, a former researcher at the Project 2049 Institute, who is conducting research on dam projects in Southeast Asia, warned, "Laos' actions not only represent a breach of trust, but threaten to undermine already fledgling efforts at regional cooperation in an ecosystem that supports the livelihoods of tens of millions of people."

Dam construction began on 15 March 2012. CH. Karnchang announced on 17 April 2012 the signing of a 52 billion baht contract with the Xayaburi Power Company. Preliminary construction (roads, bridges, support facilities) had accelerated in the prior few months. Cambodia's government immediately reacted to the announcement, threatening to take Laos to international court if they chose to build it unilaterally. Laos announced a halt to construction on 11 May 2012 due to complaints from neighbors and environmental groups. Commercial operation of the dam started in October 2019.

== Description ==
The Xayaburi Dam is on a site 350 kilometres (220 mi) upstream of Vientiane and 770 kilometres (480 mi) downstream of Jinhong, the last dam of a Chinese cascade of seven dams, including four existing and three planned dams. In terms of energy supply, it will be the third largest project among those considered for development on the mainstem in the Lower Mekong Basin.

The Xayaburi Dam is 820 metres (2,690 ft) long and 32.6 metres (107 ft) high with a rated hydraulic head of 18 metres (59 ft). Sitting at the head of a 272,000 square kilometres (105,000 sq mi) catchment area, it will create a reservoir with 1.3 km^{3} (1,100,000 acre⋅ft) gross storage capacity and a surface area of 49 square kilometres (19 sq mi). The reservoir will reach 30 metres (98 ft) in depth and stretch between 60 and 90 kilometres (37 and 56 mi). The dam features a navigation lock and two fish passes.

The power plant houses seven 175 MW Kaplan turbine-generators and one 60 MW Kaplan turbine generator. The total installed capacity is 1,285 megawatts, with a total annual energy production of 7,406 GWh. Around 95% of produced electricity (the seven 175 MW generators) would be exported to Thailand through a planned 200-kilometre (120 mi) long transmission line from the Xayaburi Dam to Loei Province in Thailand. The dam's construction was slated to take 96 months at a cost of approximately US$3.5 billion. It became operational on October 29, 2019.

The Mekong River Commission (MRC) is in doubt as to whether the dam will function in the long term because its reservoir may be filled with silt. A team of international sediment experts engaged by the MRC looked at this question and concluded that a proper sediment management plan and redesign of sediment passing structure will minimize sediment trapping. The developer stated it has accepted the MRC's conclusions and adopted its recommendations on sediment management.

== Developers, engineers, and financiers ==
The project is developed by Xayaburi Power Company Limited, a subsidiary of the Thai construction company CH. Karnchang Public Company Limited. Ch. Karnchang Public Company is also the leading contractor for the project. A syndicated loan of 80 billion Thai baht (US$2.67 billion at the March 2013 exchange rate) is provided by six Thai banks: Bangkok Bank, Kasikorn Bank, the government-owned Krung Thai Bank, Siam Commercial Bank, TISCO, and the Export-Import Bank of Thailand (EXIM Bank). Thailand’s electricity utility, EGAT, has agreed to purchase 95 percent of the dam's electricity.

The engineering firm for the dam is the Finnish company Pöyry. Pöyry carried out a comparison between the original design of the dam and the recommendations of the Mekong River Commission, a body that brings together all riparian states of the lower Mekong and that has carried out a strategic environmental assessment for the impact of the planned cascade of dams on the Mekong. In that comparison, Pöyry recommended improving the sustainability of the dam "including additional environmental studies, installation of additional fish ladders and other measures to improve fish migration as well as technical design modifications to improve the sediment and nutrients handling." After this, Pöyry was contracted to modify the design and to supervise the dam's construction, without awaiting the results of the unspecified "additional environmental studies". Critics point out that analyzing the environmental impact of a dam inherently constitutes a conflict of interest with the more lucrative design and supervision of the dam. Pöyry stated and even guaranteed that the dam's environmental impacts could be mitigated, a statement for which it was severely criticized. The French engineering company Compagnie Nationale du Rhône(CNR) was hired to provide an independent "peer review" of the Pöyry findings related to hydrology, navigation, and, in particular, sediment transport. CNR recommended further studies "to improve the project". This was interpreted as CNR distancing itself from Pöyry's conclusions.

== Impact ==
According to International Rivers, the dam's construction would cause around 2,100 people to be resettled, and more than 202,000 people living in the dam's area would experience impacts due to the loss of agricultural land and riverbank gardens, bring an end to gold panning in the river, and provide less access to the forest resources of the Luang Prabang Range. The Xayaburi Dam would also have a significant effect on the biodiversity of the river ecosystem, and the fisheries within the larger Mekong River basin. According to a World Wildlife Fund (WWF) report, the Xayaburi Dam would drive the already critically endangered Mekong giant catfish (Pangasianodon gigas) to extinction.

Because the Mekong is a complex ecosystem that hosts the most productive inland fisheries in the world, the stakes are high for the construction of such a dam. According to a study conducted by WWF and the UN Food and Agriculture Organization, and coordinated by the WorldFish Center, there are 229 fish species whose spawning and migratory patterns would be affected by a mainstream dam. This change in fish biodiversity and abundance would greatly affect the tens of millions of people in the Greater Mekong Sub-region who depend on the river for their food and livelihood. According to Phnom Penh-based WorldFish Center, this damage to fisheries "cannot be mitigated by fish passes and reservoirs".

A strategic environmental assessment commissioned by the Mekong River Commission (MRC) recommends a 10-year deferral of all Mekong mainstream dams in Cambodia, Laos, Thailand, and Vietnam, and calls for further studies. According to an MRC spokeswoman, construction of the Xayaburi Dam "will result in irreversible environmental impacts". The MRC warns that if Xayaburi and subsequent schemes went ahead, it would "fundamentally undermine the abundance, productivity and diversity of the Mekong fish resources".

Milton Osborne, Visiting Fellow at the Lowy Institute for International Policy who has written widely on the Mekong, warns: "The future scenario is of the Mekong ceasing to be a bounteous source of fish and guarantor of agricultural richness, with the great river below China becoming little more than a series of unproductive lakes."

None of the mitigation measures for fish and sediment passage included in the dam's current design have been tested at scale or in this environment. "Nowhere in the tropics has a successful fish passage been built for a dam the size of Xayaburi," said Dr. Eric Baran of the World Fish Centre in Phnom Penh. "It is unreasonable to assume that the proposed fish passage options will be efficient when they are neither based on successful experience in a similar context nor on a study of the local species."

Fish are a staple of the diet in Laos and Cambodia, with around 80% of the Cambodian population's annual protein intake coming from fish caught in the Mekong River system, with no alternative source to replace it. An MRC report claims that dam projects on the Mekong River will reduce aquatic life by 40% by 2020, and predicted that 80% of fish will be depleted by 2040. Thailand will be impacted, as its fish stocks in the Mekong will decline by 55%, Laos will be reduced by 50%, Cambodia by 35%, and Vietnam by 30%. Dams would also restrict the flow of water over agricultural areas linked to the river.

Record low water levels in the Mekong in July 2019, normally the rainy season, have led critics to point to the Xayaburi Dam as a contributor to the problem. Xayaburi Power counters that the facility is a run-of-river dam, so outflow from the 514 million cubic metre reservoir equals inflow. The power company claims it cannot share the inflow and outflow levels of the dam as the information is classified in accordance with the company's Lao government contract.
