= List of tallest dams in China =

The tallest dams in China are some of the tallest dams in the world. Nearly 22,000 dams over 15 metres (49 ft) in height – about half the world's total – have been constructed in China since the 1950s. Many of the tallest are located in the southwestern part of the country (Guizhou, Sichuan, Yunnan) on rivers such as the Mekong, the Yangtze, and its upper stretch (Jinsha River) and tributaries (Yalong, Dadu, Min and Wu). The Yellow River in the western part of the country also hosts several among the tallest. Purposes for these high structures include flood control, irrigation and, predominantly, hydroelectric power. While beneficial, many throughout the country have been criticized for their effects on the environment, displacement of locals and effect on transboundary river flows. Currently, the country's and world's tallest, Jinping-I Dam, an arch dam 305 m (1,001 ft) high, is located in Sichuan. The tallest embankment dam in China is the 261 m (856 ft) Nuozhadu Dam in Yunnan. The country's highest gravity dam is Longtan Dam at 216.2 m (709 ft), which can be found in Guangxi. At 233 m (764 ft), Shuibuya Dam in Hubei is the world's tallest concrete-face rock-fill dam. In Sichuan, the government is constructing the 312 m (1,024 ft) tall Shuangjiangkou Dam which, when complete, will become the world's tallest dam.

== List ==
All Chinese dams over 100 m (328 ft) in height are listed below.

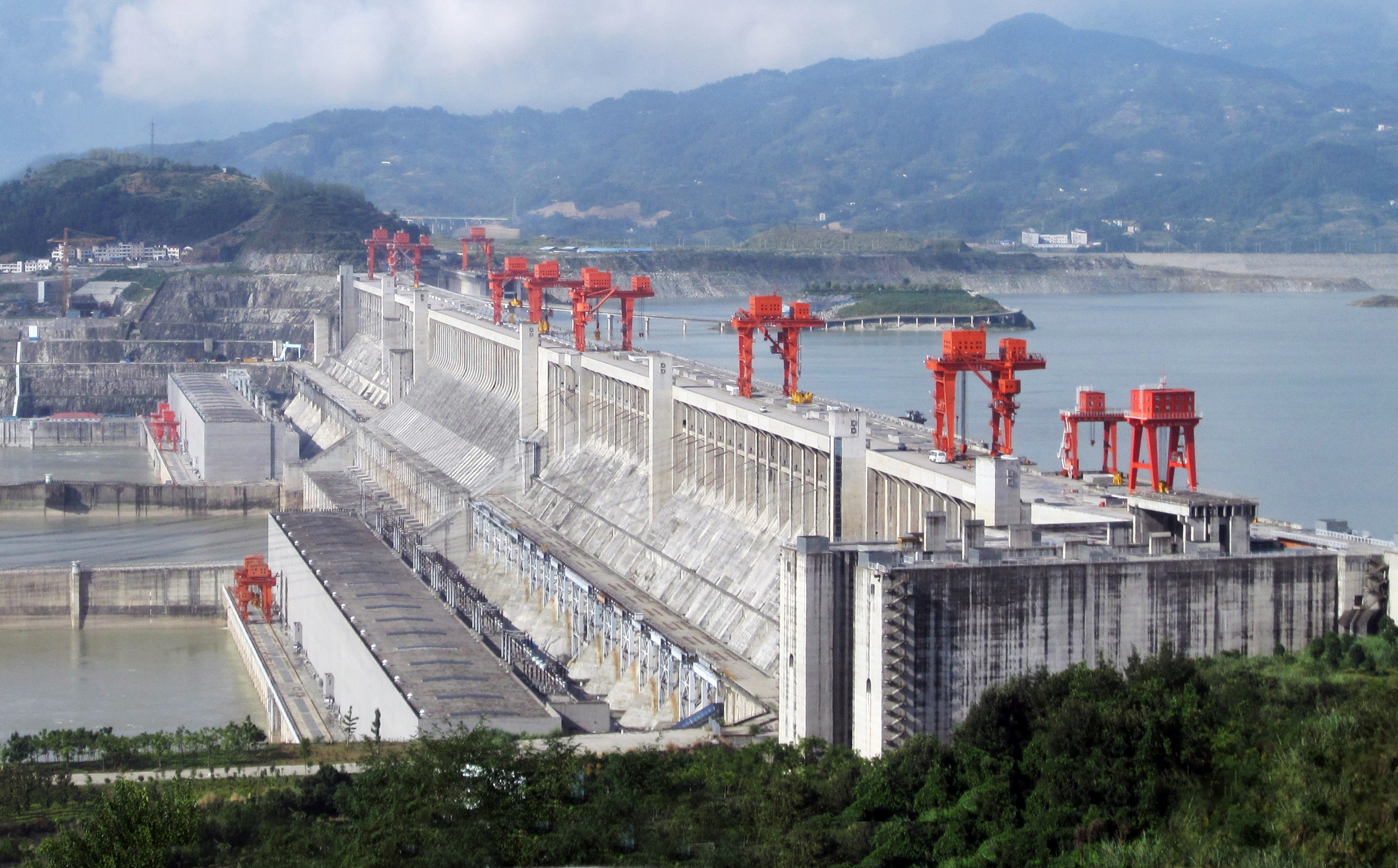
The 181 m (594 ft) tall Three Gorges Dam

Name	Region, province or city	Impounds	Height	Type	Complete	Notes
Shuangjiangkou Dam	Sichuan	Dadu River	312 m (1,024 ft)	Embankment, rock-fill	2020	
Jinping-I Dam	Sichuan	Yalong River	305 m (1,001 ft)	Arch	2013	
Lianghekou Dam	Sichuan	Yalong River	295 m (968 ft)	Arch	2023	
Xiaowan Dam	Yunnan	Lancang River	292 m (958 ft)	Arch	2010	
Xiluodu Dam	Yunnan	Jinsha River	285.5 m (937 ft)	Arch	2013	
Baihetan Dam	Sichuan/Yunnan	Jinsha River	277 m (909 ft)	Arch	2019	
Nuozhadu Dam	Yunnan	Lancang River	261.5 m (858 ft)	Embankment, rock-fill	2013	
Laxiwa Dam	Qinghai	Yellow River	250 m (820 ft)	Arch	2009	
Ertan Dam	Sichuan	Yalong River	240 m (790 ft)	Arch	1999	
Changheba Dam	Sichuan	Dadu River	240 m (790 ft)	Concrete-face rock-fill	2016	
Wudongde Dam	Sichuan/Yunnan	Jinsha River	240 m (787 ft)	Gravity	2018	
Shuibuya Dam	Hubei	Qing River	233 m (764 ft)	Concrete-face rock-fill	2008	
Goupitan Dam	Guizhou	Wu River	232.5 m (763 ft)	Arch	2009	
Houziyan Dam	Guizhou	Dadu River	223.5 m (733 ft)	Embankment	2016	
Jiangpinghe Dam	Hubei	Loushui River	221 m (725 ft)	Concrete-face rock-fill	2012	
Longtan Dam	Guangxi	Hongshui River	216 m (709 ft)	Gravity	2009	
Maerdang Dam	Qinghai	Yellow River	211 m (692 ft)	Concrete-face rock-fill	2016	
Dagangshan Dam	Sichuan	Dadu River	210 m (690 ft)	Arch	2015	
Huangdeng Dam	Yunnan	Lancang River	203 m (666 ft)	Gravity	2019	
Guangzhao Dam	Guizhou	Beipan River	200.5 m (658 ft)	Gravity	2004	
Pubugou Dam	Sichuan	Dadu River	186 m (610 ft)	Concrete-face rock-fill	2010	
Sanbanxi Dam	Guizhou	Yuan (Qingshui) River	185.5 m (609 ft)	Concrete-face rock-fill	2006	
Three Gorges Dam	Hubei	Yangtze River	181 m (594 ft)	Gravity	2008	
Hongjiadu Dam	Guizhou	Liuchong River	179.5 m (589 ft)	Concrete-face rock-fill	2005	
Longyangxia Dam	Qinghai	Yellow River	178 m (584 ft)	Arch	1992	
Tianshengqiao-I Dam	Guizhou/Guangxi	Nanpan River	178 m (584 ft)	Concrete-face rock-fill	2000	
Danjiangkou Dam	Hubei	Han River	176.6 m (579 ft)	Gravity	1973	
Kajiwa Dam	Sichuan	Muli River	171 m (561 ft)	Concrete-face rock-fill	2014	
Guandi Dam	Sichuan	Yalong River	168 m (551 ft)	Gravity	2012	
Wujiangdu Dam	Guizhou	Wu River	165 m (541 ft)	Arch-gravity	1979	
Quxue Dam	Sichuan	Shuoqu River	164.2 m (539 ft)	Embankment, rock-fill	2017	
Dongfeng Dam	Guizhou	Wu River	162 m (531 ft)	Arch	1995	
Tankeng Dam	Zhejiang	Ou River	162 m (531 ft)	Concrete-face rock-fill	2008	
Xiangjiaba Dam	Yunnan/Sichuan	Jinsha River	161 m (528 ft)	Embankment, rock-fill	2014	
Jinanqiao Dam	Yunnan	Jinsha River	160 m (520 ft)	Gravity	2010	
Guanyinyan Dam	Yunnan/Sichuan	Jinsha River	159 m (522 ft)	Gravity	2014	
Pangduo Dam	Tibet	Lhasa River	158 m (518 ft)	Embankment, rock-fill	2013	
Dongjiang Dam	Hunan	Lishui River	157 m (515 ft)	Arch	1992	
Geheyan Dam	Hubei	Qing River	157 m (515 ft)	Arch-gravity	2006	
Jilintai I Dam	Xinjiang	Kashgar River	157 m (515 ft)	Concrete-face rock-fill	2005	
Malutang Dam	Yunnan	Panlong River	156 m (512 ft)	Concrete-face rock-fill	2009	
Shatuo Dam	Guizhou	Wu River	156 m (512 ft)	Arch	2009	
Zipingpu Dam	Sichuan	Min River	156 m (512 ft)	Concrete-face rock-fill	2006	
Bashan Dam	Chongqing	Ren River	155 m (509 ft)	Concrete-face rock-fill	2009	
Lijiaxia Dam	Qinghai	Yellow River	155 m (509 ft)	Arch-gravity	1997	
Liyuan Dam	Yunnan	Jinsha River	155 m (509 ft)	Concrete-face rock-fill	2014	
Xiaolangdi Dam	Henan	Yellow River	154 m (505 ft)	Embankment, rock-fill	2000	
Yangqu Dam	Qinghai	Yellow River	150 m (492 ft)	Concrete-face rock-fill	2016	
Dongjing Dam	Guizhou	Beipan River	150 m (490 ft)	Concrete-face rock-fill	2009	
Baishan Dam	Jilin	Second Songhua River	149.5 m (490 ft)	Arch-gravity	1984	
Liujiaxia Dam	Gansu	Yellow River	147 m (482 ft)	Gravity	1969	
Maoergai Dam	Sichuan	Heishui River	147 m (482 ft)	Embankment	2011	
Longshou II Dam	Gansu	Heihe River	146.5 m (481 ft)	Concrete-face rock-fill	2004	
Jilebulake Dam	Xinjiang	Haba River	146.3 m (480 ft)	Concrete-face rock-fill	1996	
Miaowei Dam	Yunnan	Lancang River	139.8 m (459 ft)	Embankment, rock-fill	2016	
Jiangkou Dam	Chongqing	Furong River	139 m (456 ft)	Arch	2003	
Ahai Dam	Yunnan	Jinsha River	138 m (453 ft)	Gravity	2012	
Wawushan Dam	Sichuan	Zhougonghe River	138 m (453 ft)	Concrete-face rock-fill	2007	
Wuluwati Dam	Xinjiang	Kalakashi River	138 m (453 ft)	Concrete-face rock-fill	2001	
Wunonglong Dam	Yunnan	Lancang River	137.5 m (451 ft)	Gravity	2016	
Jiudianxia Dam	Gansu	Tao River	136.5 m (448 ft)	Concrete-face rock-fill	2008	
Dongping Dam	Hubei	Zhong River	135 m (443 ft)	Arch	2006	
Longma Dam	Yunnan	Lixian River	135 m (443 ft)	Concrete-face rock-fill	2007	
Dahuashui Dam	Guizhou	Qingshuihe River	134.5 m (441 ft)	Arch	2008	
Shiyazi Dam	Guizhou	Hongjiadu River	134.5 m (441 ft)	Gravity	2010	
Yingzidu Dam	Guizhou	Sancha River	134.5 m (441 ft)	Concrete-face rock-fill	2003	
Baozhusi Dam	Sichuan	Bailong River	132 m (433 ft)	Gravity	2000	
Gongboxia Dam	Qinghai	Yellow River	132 m (433 ft)	Concrete-face rock-fill	2006	
Lizhou Dam	Sichuan	Muli River	132 m (433 ft)	Arch	2016	
Manwan Dam	Yunnan	Lancang River	132 m (433 ft)	Gravity	1995	
Jiangya Dam	Hunan	Loushui River	131 m (430 ft)	Gravity	2000	
Baise Dam	Guangxi	You River	130 m (430 ft)	Gravity	2006	
Hongkou Dam	Fujian	Huotong River	130 m (430 ft)	Gravity	2008	
Jinpen Dam	Shaanxi	Heihe River	130 m (427 ft)	Embankment	2002	
Shapai Dam	Sichuan	Caopo River	130 m (430 ft)	Arch	2006	
Hunanzhen Dam	Zhejiang	Qiantang River	129 m (423 ft)	Buttress	1980	
Ankang Dam	Shaanxi	Han River	128 m (420 ft)	Gravity	1989	
Tengzigou Dam	Chongqing	Dragon River	127 m (417 ft)	Arch	2006	
Jiemian Dam	Fujian	Junxi River	126 m (413 ft)	Concrete-face rock-fill	2007	
Guxian Dam	Henan	Luohe River	125 m (410 ft)	Gravity	1995	
Yele Dam	Sichuan	Nanya River	124.5 m (408 ft)	Embankment	2006	
Qiaoqi Dam	Sichuan	Baoxinghe River	123 m (404 ft)	Embankment, rock-fill	2007	
Suofengying Dam	Guizhou	Wu River	121 m (397 ft)	Gravity	2006	
Baiyun Dam	Hunan	Wushui River	120 m (394 ft)	Concrete-face rock-fill	2006	
Gudongkou Dam	Hubei	Xiangqi River	120 m (394 ft)	Concrete-face rock-fill	1999	
Ludila Dam	Yunnan	Jinsha River	120 m (390 ft)	Gravity	2013	
Wudu Dam	Sichuan	Fu River	120 m (390 ft)	Gravity	2008	
Longkaikou Dam	Yunnan	Jinsha River	119 m (390 ft)	Gravity	2013	
Silin Dam	Guizhou	Wu River	117 m (384 ft)	Gravity	2008	
Pengshui Dam	Chongqing	Wu River	116.5 m (382 ft)	Arch	2008	
Shimenkan Dam	Yunnan	Lixian River	116 m (381 ft)	Arch	2010	
Tingzikou Dam	Sichuan	Jialing River	116 m (381 ft)	Gravity	2014	
Zangmu Dam	Tibet Autonomous Region	Yarlung Tsangpo (Brahmaputra) River	116 m (381 ft)	Gravity	2015	
Sinanjiang Dam	Yunnan	Sinan River	115 m (377 ft)	Concrete-face rock-fill	2008	
Pankou Dam	Hubei	Du River	114 m (374 ft)	Concrete-face rock-fill	2012	
Shitouhe Dam	Shaanxi	Shitouhe River	114 m (374 ft)	Embankment	1969	
Yunfeng Dam	Jilin	Yalu River	113.75 m (373.2 ft)	Gravity	1965	
Gelantan Dam	Yunnan	Lixian River	113 m (371 ft)	Gravity	2008	
Mianhuatan Dam	Fujian	Ting River	113 m (371 ft)	Gravity	1999	
Tianhuaban Dam	Yunnan	Niulan River	113 m (371 ft)	Arch	2011	
Fengtan Dam	Hunan	You River	112.5 m (369 ft)	Arch-gravity	1978	
Dachaoshan Dam	Yunnan	Lancang River	111 m (364 ft)	Gravity	2003	
Longjiang Dam	Yunnan	Long River	110 m (361 ft)	Arch	2010	
Yantan Dam	Guangdong	Hongshui River	110 m (360 ft)	Gravity	1995	
Jinghong Dam	Yunnan	Lancang River	108 m (354 ft)	Gravity	2008	
Xinanjiang (Qiandao) Dam	Zhejiang	Qiantang River	108 m (354 ft)	Gravity	1959	
Lower Baoquan Dam	Henan Province	Yuhe River	107.5 m (353 ft)	Gravity	1994/2011	
Panjiakou Dam	Hebei	Luan River	107.5 m (353 ft)	Gravity	1984	
Huanglongtan Dam	Hubei	Du River	107 m (351 ft)	Gravity	1976	
Sanmenxia Dam	Henan/Shanxi	Yellow River	106 m (348 ft)	Gravity	1960	
Dahuaqiao Dam	Yunnan	Lancang River	106 m (348 ft)	Gravity	2018	
Shuifeng (Sup'ung) Dam	Liaoning	Yalu River	106 m (348 ft)	Gravity	1941	
Madushan Dam	Yunnan	Honghe (Red) River	105.5 m (346 ft)	Gravity	2011	
Gongguoqiao Dam	Yunnan	Lancang River	105 m (344 ft)	Gravity	2011	
Wanjiazhai Dam	Shaanxi	Yellow River	105 m (344 ft)	Gravity	1998	
Xinfengjiang Dam	Guangdong	Xinfeng River	105 m (344 ft)	Gravity	1962	
Zhexi Dam	Hunan	Zi Shui River	104 m (341 ft)	Gravity	1962	
Jinshuitan Dam	Zhejiang	Longquan Creek	102 m (335 ft)	Arch	1988	
Bikou Dam	Gansu	Bailong River	101 m (331 ft)	Embankment	1977	
Jishixia Dam	Qinghai	Yellow River	101 m (331 ft)	Gravity	2010	
Lubuge Dam	Guizhou\Yunnan	Huangni River	101 m (331 ft)	Embankment	1988	
Shuikou Dam	Fujian	Min River	101 m (331 ft)	Gravity	1996	

=== Under construction ===
Name	Region, province or city	Impounds	Height	Type	Completion	Notes
Medog Hydropower Station	Tibet Autonomous Region	Yarlung Tsangpo (Brahmaputra) River	-	Hydropower	2033	

== See also ==
- List of dams and reservoirs in China
- List of tallest dams in the world
