= List of dams and reservoirs in China =

Dams and reservoirs in China are numerous and have had a profound effect on the country's development and people. According to the World Commission on Dams in 2000, there were 22,104 dams over the height of 15 m (49 ft) operating in China. Of the world's total large dams, China accounts for the most – 20 percent of them; 45 percent of which are used for irrigation. Accordingly, the oldest in China still in use belongs to the Dujiangyan Irrigation System which dates back to 256 BC. In 2005, there were over 80,000 reservoirs in the country and over 4,800 dams completed or under construction that stands at or exceed 30 m (98 ft) in height. As of 2007, China is also the world's leader in the construction of large dams; followed by Turkey, and Japan in third. The tallest dam in China is the Jinping-I Dam at 305 m (1,001 ft), an arch dam, which is also the tallest dam in the world. The largest reservoir is created by the Three Gorges Dam, which stores 39.3 billion m^{3} (31,900,000 acre feet) of water and has a surface area of 1,045 km^{2} (403 sq mi). Three Gorges is also the world's largest power station.

Dams and their associated reservoirs are constructed by the country for several reasons including hydroelectric power generation, flood control, irrigation, drought mitigation, navigation and tourism. China has the largest potential for hydropower in the world and currently ranks first in hydroelectric generating capacity with about 200,000 MW online. These benefits have come with adverse effects such as resettlement and inundation while impeding river flow often leads to habitat loss and on certain rivers there are issues with trans-boundary river flow.

The nation's leading institution for dam design is the Beijing-based China Institute of Water Resources and Hydropower Research (IWHR), somewhat similar to Russia's Hydroproject Institute.

Below is a partial list of dams and reservoirs in China that are both operational and under construction. The most notable by height, type, and reservoir size, are among those listed. The minimum height for a dam to be included on the list is 20 m (66 ft).

== List ==
Name	Region, province or city	Impounds	Height	Type	Storage capacity	Complete	Notes
Ahai Dam	Yunnan Province	Jinsha River	138 m (453 ft)	Gravity	8,820,000,000 m^{3} (7,150,490 acre⋅ft)	2012	
Ankang Dam	Shaanxi Province	Han River	128 m (420 ft)	Gravity	2,580,000,000 m^{3} (2,091,640 acre⋅ft)	1989	
Baihetan Dam	Sichuan/Yunnan Provinces	Jinsha River	277 m (909 ft)	Arch	17,924,000,000 m^{3} (14,531,223 acre⋅ft)	2021	
Baise Dam	Guangxi	You River	130 m (427 ft)	Gravity	5,660,000,000 m^{3} (4,588,637 acre⋅ft)	2006	
Lower Baoquan Dam	Henan Province	Yuhe River	107.5 m (353 ft)	Gravity	16,500,000 m^{3} (13,377 acre⋅ft)	1994	
Upper Baoquan Dam	Henan Province	Upper Baoquan Reservoir	94.8 m (311 ft)	Concrete-face rock-fill	8,270,000 m^{3} (6,700 acre⋅ft)	2011	
Baogang Tailings Dam	Inner Mongolia	N/A	6 m (20 ft)	Embankment, tailings	85,000,000 m^{3} (68,911 acre⋅ft)	1965	
Baozhusi Dam	Sichuan Province	Bailong River	132 m (433 ft)	Gravity	2,550,000,000 m^{3} (2,067,319 acre⋅ft)	2000	
Bashan Dam	Chongqing	Renhe River	155 m (509 ft)	Concrete-face rock-fill	315,000,000 m^{3} (255,375 acre⋅ft)	2009	
Baishan Dam	Jilin Province	Second Songhua River	149.5 m (490 ft)	Arch-gravity	6,500,000,000 m^{3} (5,269,636 acre⋅ft)	1984	
Baiyun Dam	Hunan Province	Wushui River	120 m (394 ft)	Concrete-face rock-fill	545,000,000 m^{3} (441,839 acre⋅ft)	2006	
Banqiao Dam	Henan Province	Ru River	50.5 m (166 ft)	Embankment	675,000,000 m^{3} (547,231 acre⋅ft)	1952/93	
Bikou Dam	Gansu Province	Bailong River	101 m (331 ft)	Embankment	521,000,000 m^{3} (422,382 acre⋅ft)	1977	
Burqin Shankou Dam	Xinjiang	Burqin River	94 m (308 ft)	Arch	221,000,000 m^{3} (179,168 acre⋅ft)	2013	
Changheba Dam	Sichuan Province	Dadu River	240 m (787 ft)	Concrete-face rock-fill	1,075,000,000 m^{3} (871,517 acre⋅ft)	2016	
Changshou Dam	Chongqing	Yangtze River	52 m (171 ft)	Embankment	1,027,000,000 m^{3} (832,602 acre⋅ft)	1954	
Chengbihe Dam	Guangxi	Chengbihe River	70 m (230 ft)	Embankment	1,150,000,000 m^{3} (932,320 acre⋅ft)	1961	
Chonghu'er Dam	Xinjiang	Burqin River	74 m (243 ft)	Gravity	85,000,000 m^{3} (68,911 acre⋅ft)	2009	
Dachaoshan Dam	Yunnan Province	Lancang River	111 m (364 ft)	Gravity	940,000,000 m^{3} (762,070 acre⋅ft)	2003	
Dagangshan Dam	Sichuan Province	Dadu River	210 m (689 ft)	Arch	724,000,000 m^{3} (586,956 acre⋅ft)	2014	
Daguangba Dam	Hainan Province	Changhua River	57 m (187 ft)	Gravity/Embankment	1,710,000,000 m^{3} (1,386,320 acre⋅ft)	1995	
Dahuaqiao Dam	Yunnan Province	Lancang River	106 m (348 ft)	Gravity	293,000,000 m^{3} (237,539 acre⋅ft)	2018 (?)	
Dahuashui Dam	Guizhou Province	Qingshuihe River	134.5 m (441 ft)	Arch	276,500,000 m^{3} (224,162 acre⋅ft)	2008	
Danjiangkou Dam	Hubei Province	Han River	176.6 m (579 ft)	Gravity	17,450,000,000 m^{3} (14,146,945 acre⋅ft)	1973	
Dongfeng Dam	Guizhou Province	Wu River	162 m (531 ft)	Arch	1,025,000,000 m^{3} (830,981 acre⋅ft)	1995	
Dongjing Dam	Guizhou Province	Beipan River	150 m (492 ft)	Concrete-face rock-fill	955,000,000 m^{3} (774,231 acre⋅ft)	2009	
Dongjiang Dam	Hunan Province	Lishui River	157 m (515 ft)	Arch	9,565,000,000 m^{3} (7,754,472 acre⋅ft)	1992	
Dongping Dam	Hubei Province	Zhong River	135 m (443 ft)	Arch	336,000,000 m^{3} (272,400 acre⋅ft)	2006	
Ertan Dam	Sichuan Province	Yalong River	240 m (787 ft)	Arch	5,800,000,000 m^{3} (4,702,137 acre⋅ft)	1999	
Fengman Dam	Jilin Province	Second Songhua River	91 m (299 ft)	Gravity	11,460,000,000 m^{3} (9,290,773 acre⋅ft)	1953	
Fengshuba Dam	Guangdong Province	Dong River	95.4 m (313 ft)	Gravity	1,932,000,000 m^{3} (1,566,298 acre⋅ft)	1974	
Fengtan Dam	Hunan Province	You River	112.5 m (369 ft)	Arch-gravity	1,740,000,000 m^{3} (1,410,641 acre⋅ft)	1978	
Geheyan Dam	Hubei Province	Qing River	157 m (515 ft)	Arch-gravity	3,400,000,000 m^{3} (2,756,425 acre⋅ft)	2006	
Gelantan Dam	Yunnan Province	Lixian River	113 m (371 ft)	Gravity	409,000,000 m^{3} (331,582 acre⋅ft)	2008	
Gezhen Dam	Hainan Province	Changhua River	34 m (112 ft)	Gravity/Embankment	146,000,000 m^{3} (118,000 acre⋅ft)	2009	
Gezhouba Dam	Hubei Province	Yangtze River	47 m (154 ft)	Gravity	1,580,000,000 m^{3} (1,280,927 acre⋅ft)	1988	
Gongboxia Dam	Qinghai Province	Yellow River	132 m (433 ft)	Concrete-face rock-fill	630,000,000 m^{3} (510,749 acre⋅ft)	2006	
Gongguoqiao Dam	Yunnan Province	Lancang River	105 m (344 ft)	Gravity	120,000,000 m^{3} (97,286 acre⋅ft)	2011	
Goupitan Dam	Guizhou Province	Wu River	232.5 m (763 ft)	Arch	6,451,000,000 m^{3} (5,229,911 acre⋅ft)	2009	
Guandi Dam	Sichuan Province	Yalong River	168 m (551 ft)	Gravity	760,000,000 m^{3} (616,142 acre⋅ft)	2012	
Guangzhao Dam	Yunnan Province	Beipan River	200.5 m (658 ft)	Gravity	3,254,000,000 m^{3} (2,638,061 acre⋅ft)	2004	
Guanyinyan Dam	Yunnan/Sichuan Province	Jinsha River	159 m (522 ft)	Gravity	2,072,000,000 m^{3} (1,679,798 acre⋅ft)	2014	
Gudongkou Dam	Hubei Province	Xiangqi River	120 m (394 ft)	Concrete-face rock-fill	138,000,000 m^{3} (111,878 acre⋅ft)	1999	
Guxian Dam	Henan Province	Luohe River	125 m (410 ft)	Gravity	1,175,000,000 m^{3} (952,588 acre⋅ft)	1995	
Huating Dam	Anhui Province	Changhe River	57.9 m (190 ft)	Embankment	2,390,000,000 m^{3} (1,937,605 acre⋅ft)	1976	
Hongjiadu Dam	Guizhou Province	Liuchong River	179.5 m (589 ft)	Concrete-face rock-fill	4,947,000,000 m^{3} (4,010,598 acre⋅ft)	2005	
Hongkou Dam	Fujian Province	Huotong River	130 m (427 ft)	Gravity	449,700,000 m^{3} (364,578 acre⋅ft)	2008	
Hongshi Dam	Jilin Province	Second Songhua River	46 m (151 ft)	Gravity	1,630,000,000 m^{3} (1,321,463 acre⋅ft)	1985	
Houziyan Dam	Guizhou Province	Dadu River	223.5 m (733 ft)	Embankment	662,000,000 m^{3} (536,692 acre⋅ft)	2017 (?)	
Huangdeng Dam	Yunnan Province	Lancang River	203 m (666 ft)	Gravity	1,613,000,000 m^{3} (1,307,680 acre⋅ft)	2018 (?)	
Huanglongtan Dam	Hubei Province	Duhe River	107 m (351 ft)	Gravity	1,228,000,000 m^{3} (995,556 acre⋅ft)	1976	
Hunanzhen Dam	Zhejiang Province	Qiantang River	129 m (423 ft)	Buttress	2,067,000,000 m^{3} (1,675,744 acre⋅ft)	1980	
Jiemian Dam	Fujian Province	Junxi River	126 m (413 ft)	Concrete-face rock-fill	1,824,000,000 m^{3} (1,478,741 acre⋅ft)	2007	
Jiangkou Dam	Chongqing	Furong River	139 m (456 ft)	Arch	497,000,000 m^{3} (402,924 acre⋅ft)	2003	
Jiangpinghe Dam	Hubei Province	Loushui River	221 m (725 ft)	Concrete-face rock-fill	1,366,000,000 m^{3} (1,107,434 acre⋅ft)	2012	
Jiangya Dam	Hunan Province	Loushui River	131 m (430 ft)	Gravity	1,740,000,000 m^{3} (1,410,641 acre⋅ft)	2000	
Jilebulake Dam	Xinjiang	Haba River	146.3 m (480 ft)	Concrete-face rock-fill	232,000,000 m^{3} (188,085 acre⋅ft)	2013	
Jilintai I Dam	Xinjiang	Kashgar River	157 m (515 ft)	Concrete-face rock-fill	2,530,000,000 m^{3} (2,051,104 acre⋅ft)	2005	
Jinanqiao Dam	Yunnan Province	Jinsha River	160 m (525 ft)	Gravity	847,000,000 m^{3} (686,674 acre⋅ft)	2010	
Jinghong Dam	Yunnan Province	Lancang River	108 m (354 ft)	Gravity	249,000,000 m^{3} (201,868 acre⋅ft)	2008	
Jinpen Dam	Shaanxi Province	Heihe River	130 m (427 ft)	Embankment	200,000,000 m^{3} (160,000 acre⋅ft)	2002	
Jinping-I Dam	Sichuan Province	Yalong River	305 m (1,001 ft)	Arch	7,700,000,000 m^{3} (6,200,000 acre⋅ft)	2013	
Jinping-II Dam	Sichuan Province	Yalong River	37 m (121 ft)	Gravity	14,200,000 m^{3} (11,500 acre⋅ft)	2012	
Jinshuitan Dam	Zhejiang Province	Longquan Creek	102 m (335 ft)	Arch	13,930,000,000 m^{3} (11,290,000 acre⋅ft)	1988	
Jishixia Dam	Qinghai Province	Yellow River	101 m (331 ft)	Gravity	263,500,000 m^{3} (213,600 acre⋅ft)	2010	
Jiudianxia Dam	Gansu Province	Tao River	136.5 m (448 ft)	Concrete-face rock-fill	94,300,000 m^{3} (76,450 acre⋅ft)	2008	
Jufudu Dam	Yunnan Province	Lixian River	95 m (312 ft)	Gravity	174,000,000 m^{3} (141,064 acre⋅ft)	2008	
Kajiwa Dam	Sichuan Province	Muli River	171 m (561 ft)	Concrete-face rock-fill	375,000,000 m^{3} (304,017 acre⋅ft)	2014	
Laxiwa Dam	Qinghai Province	Yellow River	250 m (820 ft)	Arch	1,079,000,000 m^{3} (875,000 acre⋅ft)	2009	
Lianghekou Dam	Sichuan Province	Yalong River	295 m (968 ft)	Arch	10,770,000,000 m^{3} (8,731,381 acre⋅ft)	2021	
Lianhua Dam	Heilongjiang Province	Mudan River	71.8 m (236 ft)	Concrete-face rock-fill	4,180,000,000 m^{3} (3,390,000 acre⋅ft)	1996	
Lijiaxia Dam	Qinghai Province	Yellow River	155 m (509 ft)	Arch-gravity	1,650,000,000 m^{3} (1,337,677 acre⋅ft)	1997	
Liujiaxia Dam	Gansu Province	Yellow River	147 m (482 ft)	Gravity	4,240,000,000 m^{3} (3,437,424 acre⋅ft)	1969	
Liuxihe Dam	Guangdong Province	Liuxihe River	78 m (256 ft)	Arch	325,000,000 m^{3} (263,482 acre⋅ft)	1958	
Liyuan Dam	Yunnan Province	Jinsha River	155 m (509 ft)	Concrete-face rock-fill	727,000,000 m^{3} (589,388 acre⋅ft)	2014	
Lizhou Dam	Sichuan Province	Muli River	132 m (433 ft)	Arch	186,900,000 m^{3} (151,522 acre⋅ft)	2015	
Longjiang Dam	Yunnan Province	Long River	110 m (361 ft)	Arch	1,217,000,000 m^{3} (986,638 acre⋅ft)	2010	
Longkaikou Dam	Yunnan Province	Jinsha River	119 m (390 ft)	Gravity	544,000,000 m^{3} (441,028 acre⋅ft)	2013	
Longma Dam	Yunnan Province	Lixian River	135 m (443 ft)	Concrete-face rock-fill	590,000,000 m^{3} (478,321 acre⋅ft)	2007	
Longshou II Dam	Gansu Province	Heihe River	146.5 m (481 ft)	Concrete-face rock-fill	86,200,000 m^{3} (69,883 acre⋅ft)	2004	
Longtan Dam	Guangxi	Hongshui River	216 m (709 ft)	Gravity	27,270,000,000 m^{3} (22,108,149 acre⋅ft)	2009	
Longtang Dam	Hainan Province	Nandu River		Gravity		2011	
Longyangxia Dam	Qinghai Province	Yellow River	178 m (584 ft)	Arch	24,700,000,000 m^{3} (20,024,616 acre⋅ft)	1992	
Lubuge Dam	Guizhou\Yunnan Provinces	Huangni River	101 m (331 ft)	Embankment	110,000,000 m^{3} (89,178 acre⋅ft)	1988	
Ludila Dam	Yunnan Province	Jinsha River	120 m (394 ft)	Gravity	1,718,000,000 m^{3} (1,392,805 acre⋅ft)	2015	
Madushan Dam	Yunnan Province	Honghe (Red) River	105.5 m (346 ft)	Gravity	551,000,000 m^{3} (446,703 acre⋅ft)	2011	
Maerdang Dam	Qinghai Province	Yellow River	211 m (692 ft)	Concrete-face rock-fill	1,482,000,000 m^{3} (1,201,477 acre⋅ft)	2020	
Malutang Dam	Yunnan Province	Panlong River	156 m (512 ft)	Concrete-face rock-fill	546,000,000 m^{3} (442,649 acre⋅ft)	2009	
Manwan Dam	Yunnan Province	Lancang River	132 m (433 ft)	Gravity	920,000,000 m^{3} (745,856 acre⋅ft)	1995	
Maoergai Dam	Sichuan Province	Heishui River	147 m (482 ft)	Embankment	535,000,000 m^{3} (433,732 acre⋅ft)	2011	
Mianhuatan Dam	Fujian Province	Ting River	113 m (371 ft)	Gravity	1,698,000,000 m^{3} (1,376,591 acre⋅ft)	1999	
Miaowei Dam	Yunnan Province	Lancang River	139.8 m (459 ft)	Embankment, rock-fill	660,000,000 m^{3} (535,071 acre⋅ft)	2014	
Nanwan Dam	Henan Province	Huai River	38.3 m (126 ft)	Embankment	1,340,000,000 m^{3} (1,090,000 acre⋅ft)	1955	
Nierji Dam	Heilongjiang Province/Inner Mongolia	Nen River	41.5 m (136 ft)	Embankment, rock-fill	8,610,000,000 m^{3} (6,980,000 acre⋅ft)	2006	
Niululing Dam	Hainan Province	Wanquan Basin	90.5 m (297 ft)	Gravity	778,000,000 m^{3} (631,000 acre⋅ft)	1982	
Nuozhadu Dam	Yunnan Province	Lancang River	261.5 m (858 ft)	Embankment, rock-fill	21,749,000,000 m^{3} (17,632,000 acre⋅ft)	2014	
Pangduo Dam	Tibet Autonomous Region	Lhasa River	158 m (518 ft)	Embankment, rock-fill	1,170,000,000 m^{3} (950,000 acre⋅ft)	2013	
Panjiakou Dam	Hebei Province	Luan River	107.5 m (353 ft)	Gravity	2,930,000,000 m^{3} (2,375,390 acre⋅ft)	1984	
Pankou Dam	Hubei Province	Du River	114 m (374 ft)	Concrete-face rock-fill	1,970,000,000 m^{3} (1,597,105 acre⋅ft)	2012	
Pengshui Dam	Chongqing	Wu River	116.5 m (382 ft)	Arch	518,000,000 m^{3} (419,949 acre⋅ft)	2008	
Project 635 Dam	Xinjiang	Irtysh River	70.6 m (232 ft)	Embankment, rock-fill	282,000,000 m^{3} (228,621 acre⋅ft)	2001	
Pubugou Dam	Sichuan Province	Dadu River	186 m (610 ft)	Concrete-face rock-fill	5,390,000,000 m^{3} (4,369,744 acre⋅ft)	2010	
Qiaoqi Dam	Sichuan Province	Baoxinghe River	123 m (404 ft)	Embankment, rock-fill	214,000,000 m^{3} (173,493 acre⋅ft)	2009	
Quxue Dam	Sichuan Province	Shuoqu River	164.2 m (539 ft)	Embankment, rock-fill	132,600,000 m^{3} (107,501 acre⋅ft)	2017 (?)	
Renzonghai Dam	Sichuan Province	Tianwan River	60 m (197 ft)	Embankment, rock-fill	112,000,000 m^{3} (91,000 acre⋅ft)	2007	
Sanbanxi Dam	Guizhou Province	Yuan (Qingshui) River	185.5 m (609 ft)	Concrete-face rock-fill	4,094,000,000 m^{3} (3,319,060 acre⋅ft)	2006	
Sanmenxia Dam	Henan/Shanxi Province	Yellow River	106 m (348 ft)	Gravity	16,200,000,000 m^{3} (13,133,554 acre⋅ft)	1960	
Shapai Dam	Sichuan Province	Caopo River	130 m (427 ft)	Arch	3,135,000,000 m^{3} (2,541,586 acre⋅ft)	2006	
Shatuo Dam	Guizhou Province	Wu River	156 m (512 ft)	Arch	631,000,000 m^{3} (511,560 acre⋅ft)	2009	
Shiyazi Dam	Guizhou Province	Hongjiadu River	134.5 m (441 ft)	Gravity	321,500,000 m^{3} (260,644 acre⋅ft)	2010	
Shimenkan Dam	Yunnan Province	Lixian River	116 m (381 ft)	Arch	197,000,000 m^{3} (159,710 acre⋅ft)	2010	
Shisanling Dam	Beijing	Wenyu River	29 m (95 ft)	Embankment	59,000,000 m^{3} (47,832 acre⋅ft)	1995	
Shitouhe Dam	Shaanxi Province	Shitouhe River	114 m (374 ft)	Embankment	147,000,000 m^{3} (119,175 acre⋅ft)	1969	
Shuangjiangkou Dam	Sichuan Province	Dadu River	312 m (1,024 ft)	Embankment, rock-fill	3,135,000,000 m^{3} (2,541,586 acre⋅ft)	2020	
Shuibuya Dam	Hubei Province	Qing River	233 m (764 ft)	Concrete-face rock-fill	4,580,000,000 m^{3} (3,710,000 acre⋅ft)	2008	
Shuifeng (Sup'ung) Dam	Liaoning Province	Yalu River	106 m (348 ft)	Gravity	14,600,000,000 m^{3} (11,836,413 acre⋅ft)	1941	
Shuikou Dam	Fujian Province	Min River	101 m (331 ft)	Gravity	2,600,000,000 m^{3} (2,100,000 acre⋅ft)	1996	
Silin Dam	Guizhou Province	Wu River	117 m (384 ft)	Gravity	1,205,000,000 m^{3} (977,000 acre⋅ft)	2008	
Sinanjiang Dam	Yunnan Province	Sinan River	115 m (377 ft)	Concrete-face rock-fill	270,000,000 m^{3} (220,000 acre⋅ft)	2008	
Songtao Dam	Hainan Province	Nandu River	80.7 m (265 ft)	Embankment, earth-fill	3,070,000,000 m^{3} (2,490,000 acre⋅ft)	1969	
Suofengying Dam	Guizhou Province	Wu River	121 m (397 ft)	Gravity	201,200,000 m^{3} (163,115 acre⋅ft)	2006	
Taipingwan Dam	Liaoning Province	Yalu River	31.5 m (103 ft)	Gravity	100,000,000 m^{3} (81,071 acre⋅ft)	1987	
Tankeng Dam	Zhejiang Province	Ou River	162 m (531 ft)	Concrete-face rock-fill	4,190,000,000 m^{3} (3,396,888 acre⋅ft)	2008	
Tengzigou Dam	Chongqing	Dragon River	127 m (417 ft)	Arch	193,000,000 m^{3} (156,468 acre⋅ft)	2006	
Three Gorges Dam	Hubei Province	Yangtze River	181 m (594 ft)	Gravity	39,300,000,000 m^{3} (31,900,000 acre⋅ft)	2008	
Tianhuaban Dam	Yunnan Province	Niulan River	113 m (371 ft)	Arch	65,700,000 m^{3} (53,300 acre⋅ft)	2011	
Tianhuangping Dam	Zhejiang Province	Daxi Creek	72 m (236 ft)	Concrete-face rock-fill	6,770,000 m^{3} (5,490 acre⋅ft)	2004	
Tianshengqiao-I Dam	Guizhou/Guangxi Province	Nanpan River	178 m (584 ft)	Concrete-face rock-fill	10,257,000,000 m^{3} (8,315,000 acre⋅ft)	2000	
Tianshengqiao-II Dam	Guizhou/Guangxi Province	Nanpan River	58.7 m (193 ft)	Concrete-face rock-fill	26,000,000 m^{3} (21,000 acre⋅ft)	1997	
Tingzikou Dam	Sichuan Province	Jialing River	116 m (381 ft)	Gravity	4,067,000,000 m^{3} (3,297,000 acre⋅ft)	2014	
Tukahe Dam	Yunnan Province	Lixian River	59.2 m (194 ft)	Gravity	88,000,000 m^{3} (71,343 acre⋅ft)	2008	
Wanjiazhai Dam	Shaanxi Province	Yellow River	105 m (344 ft)	Gravity	896,000,000 m^{3} (726,000 acre⋅ft)	1998	
Wawushan Dam	Sichuan Province	Zhougonghe River	138 m (453 ft)	Concrete-face rock-fill	545,000,000 m^{3} (441,839 acre⋅ft)	2007	
Weiyuan Dam	Jilin Province	Yalu River	55 m (180 ft)	Gravity	626,000,000 m^{3} (507,506 acre⋅ft)	1987	
Wudongde Dam	Sichuan/Yunnan Province	Jinsha River	270 m (886 ft)	Compound Arch	7,600,000,000 m^{3} (6,161,420 acre⋅ft)	2020	
Wudu Dam	Sichuan Province	Fu River	120 m (394 ft)	Gravity	572,000,000 m^{3} (463,728 acre⋅ft)	2008	
Wujiangdu Dam	Guizhou Province	Wu River	165 m (541 ft)	Arch-gravity	2,300,000,000 m^{3} (1,900,000 acre⋅ft)	1979	
Wunonglong Dam	Yunnan Province	Lancang River	137.5 m (451 ft)	Gravity	272,000,000 m^{3} (220,514 acre⋅ft)	2018 (?)	
Wuluwati Dam	Xinjiang	Kalakashi River	138 m (453 ft)	Concrete-face rock-fill	347,000,000 m^{3} (281,317 acre⋅ft)	2001	
Wuqiangxi Dam	Hunan Province	Yuan River	87.5 m (287 ft)	Gravity	4,350,000,000 m^{3} (3,530,000 acre⋅ft)	1996	
Xiangjiaba Dam	Yunnan/Sichuan Provinces	Jinsha River	161 m (528 ft)	Embankment, rock-fill	5,163,000,000 m^{3} (4,185,712 acre⋅ft)	2012	
Xiaolangdi Dam	Henan Province	Yellow River	154 m (505 ft)	Embankment, rock-fill	12,800,000,000 m^{3} (10,377,129 acre⋅ft)	2000	
Xiaowan Dam	Yunnan Province	Lancang River	292 m (958 ft)	Arch	15,000,000,000 m^{3} (12,000,000 acre⋅ft)	2010	
Xiluodu Dam	Yunnan Province	Jinsha River	285.5 m (937 ft)	Arch	12,670,000,000 m^{3} (10,270,000 acre⋅ft)	2013	
Xinanjiang (Qiandao) Dam	Zheijang Province	Qiantang River	108 m (354 ft)	Gravity	22,000,000,000 m^{3} (18,000,000 acre⋅ft)	1959	
Xinfengjiang Dam	Guangdong Province	Xinfeng River	105 m (344 ft)	Gravity	13,900,000,000 m^{3} (11,300,000 acre⋅ft)	1962	
Yamaguchi Dam	Xinjiang	Haba River	40.5 m (133 ft)	Concrete-face rock-fill	50,000,000 m^{3} (40,536 acre⋅ft)	1996	
Yangqu Dam	Qinghai Province	Yellow River	150 m (492 ft)	Concrete-face rock-fill	1,472,000,000 m^{3} (1,193,000 acre⋅ft)	2016 (?)	
Yantan Dam	Guangdong Province	Hongshui River	110 m (361 ft)	Gravity	2,612,000,000 m^{3} (2,118,000 acre⋅ft)	1995	
Yayangshan Dam	Yunnan Province	Lixian River	88 m (289 ft)	Concrete-face rock-fill	247,000,000 m^{3} (200,000 acre⋅ft)	2006	
Yele Dam	Sichuan Province	Nanya River	124.5 m (408 ft)	Embankment	298,000,000 m^{3} (242,000 acre⋅ft)	2006	
Yingzidu Dam	Guizhou Province	Sancha River	134.5 m (441 ft)	Concrete-face rock-fill	455,000,000 m^{3} (369,000 acre⋅ft)	2003	
Yinpan Dam	Chongqing	Wu River	78.5 m (258 ft)	Gravity	320,000,000 m^{3} (259,428 acre⋅ft)	2011	
Yulongyan Dam	Hunan Province	Gongxi River	96 m (315 ft)	Arch	57,800,000 m^{3} (46,900 acre⋅ft)	2005	
Yunfeng Dam	Jilin Province	Yalu River	113.75 m (373 ft)	Gravity	3,895,000,000 m^{3} (3,157,728 acre⋅ft)	1965	
Zangmu Dam	Tibet Autonomous Region	Brahmaputra River	116 m (381 ft)	Gravity	86,600,000 m^{3} (70,208 acre⋅ft)	2015	
Zhelin Dam	Jiangxi Province	Zhelin River	72.5 m (238 ft)	Embankment, earth-fill	7,900,000,000 m^{3} (6,404,634 acre⋅ft)	1972	
Zhexi Dam	Hunan Province	Zi Shui River	104 m (341 ft)	Gravity	3,656,000,000 m^{3} (2,963,967 acre⋅ft)	1962	
Zhikong Dam	Tibet Autonomous Region	Lhasa River	50 m (164 ft)	Embankment, rock-fill	225,000,000 m^{3} (182,410 acre⋅ft)	2007	
Zipingpu Dam	Sichuan Province	Min River	156 m (512 ft)	Concrete-face rock-fill	1,120,000,000 m^{3} (907,999 acre⋅ft)	2006	

== See also ==
- List of power stations in China
- List of tallest dams in China
- Hydroelectricity in China
