= List of major power stations in Fujian province =

Location of power stations in Fujian province: coal/oil/gas, nuclear, hydroelectric, wind

This article lists the major power stations located in Fujian Province.

== Non-renewable ==
=== Coal based ===
Station	Name in Chinese	Coordinates	Capacity (MW)	Operational units and (type)	Under construction units	Reference
Kemen Power Station	可门电厂	26°22′24″N 119°45′44″E	4,400	4×600MW, 2×1,000MW		
Houshi Power Station	后石电厂	24°18′17″N 118°07′32″E	4,200	7×600MW		
Meizhouwan Power Station	湄洲湾电厂	25°09′40″N 119°02′02″E	4,112	2×396MW, 2×1,000MW	2×660MW	
Quanzhou Thermal Power Station	泉州热电厂	25°12′16″N 118°56′41″E	3,260	2×300MW, 2×670MW	2×660MW	
Hongshan thermal Power Station	鸿山热电厂	24°43′48″N 118°44′57″E	3,200	2×600MW, 2×1,000MW		
Fuzhou Power Station	福州电厂	25°59′27″N 119°28′54″E	2,720	4×350MW, 2×660MW		
Ningde Power Station	宁德电厂	26°45′27″N 119°44′13″E	2,520	2×600MW, 2×660MW		
Guoneng Fuzhou Thermal Power Station	国能福州热电厂	25°26′21″N 119°20′22″E	2,520	2×600MW	2×660MW	
Guoneng Lianjiang Power Station	国能连江港电	26°23′07″N 119°47′21″E	2,000	2×1,000MW		
Songyu Power Station	嵩屿电厂	24°26′49″N 118°01′35″E	1,800	4×300MW	1×600MW	
Shaowu Power Station	邵武电厂	27°23′2″N 117°27′46″E	1,320	2×660MW		
Luoyuan Power Station	罗源电厂	26°24′41″N 119°45′49″E	1,320	2×660MW		
Quanzhou Power Station	泉州泉惠石化工业区电厂	25°02′34″N 118°55′19″E	1,320		2×660MW	
Longyan Pithead Power Station	龙岩坑口电厂	25°16′47″N 117°09′19″E	600	2×300MW		
Zhangping Power Station	漳平电厂	25°17′04″N 117°23′56″E	600	2×300MW		
Yong'an Power Station	永安电厂	26°00′15″N 117°22′50″E	600	2×300MW		

=== Natural gas based ===
Station	Name in Chinese	Coordinates	Capacity (MW)	Operational units and (type)	Under construction units	Reference
Putian LNG Power Station	莆田燃气电厂	25°13′03″N 119°00′08″E	1,560	4×390MW		
Jinjiang LNG Power Station	晋江燃气电厂	24°33′48″N 118°38′37″E	1,400	4×350MW		
Xiamen Eastern LNG Power Station	厦门东部燃气电厂	24°32′44″N 118°13′34″E	780	2×390MW		

=== Nuclear ===
Station	Name in Chinese	Coordinates	Capacity (MW)	Operational reactors	Under construction Reactors	Planned reactors	Reference
Ningde Nuclear Power Plant	宁德核电站	27°02′46″N 120°17′18″E	4,320	4×1080MW (CPR1000)		2×1080MW	
Fuqing Nuclear Power Plant	福清核电站	25°26′39″N 119°26′46″E	4,500	2×1080MW (CPR1000)	2×1080MW (CPR1000), 2×1,170MW (Hualong 1)		
Zhangzhou Nuclear Power Plant	漳州核电站	23°49′43″N 117°29′33″E	2,240		2×1220MW (Hualong-1)		
Xiapu Nuclear Power Plant	霞浦核电站	26°48′06″N 120°09′11″E	600		1×600MWe (CFR-600)		

== Renewable ==
=== Hydroelectric ===
==== Conventional ====
Station	Name in Chinese	Coordinates	River	Total capacity (MW)	Dam height (meters)	Status	Operational Units	Under construction units	Planned units	Reference
Shuikou Hydro Power Station	水口水电站	26°18′12″N 118°48′44″E	Min river	1,400	101	Operational	7×200MW			
Mianhuatan Hydro Power Station	棉花滩水电站	24°39′41″N 116°35′46″E	Ding river	600	111	Operational	4×150MW			
Shaxikou Hydro Power Station	沙溪口水电站	26°35′09″N 118°04′57″E	Xixi river	300	40	Operational	4×75MW			
Jiemian Hydro Power Station	街面水电站	25°56′19″N 118°02′38″E	Junxi river	300	126	Operational	2×150MW			

==== Pumped-storage ====
Station	Name in Chinese	Coordinates	Status	Capacity (MW)	Height difference (meters)	Operational units	Under construction units
Xianyou Pumped Storage Power Station	仙游抽水蓄能电站	25°31′55″N 118°33′14″E	Operationa	1,200		4×300MW	
Zhouning Pumped-storage Hydro Power Station	周宁抽水蓄能电站	27°05′21″N 119°24′23″E	Operationa	1,200	408	4×300MW	
Yongtai Pumped-storage Hydro Power Station	永泰抽水蓄能电站	27°05′21″N 119°24′23″E	Operationa	1,200	416	4×300MW	
Yunxiao Pumped-storage Hydro Power Station	云霄抽水蓄能电站		UC	1,800	465		6×300MW
Xiamen Pumped-storage Hydro Power Station	厦门抽水蓄能电站	24°51′33″N 118°10′07″E	UC	1,400	545		4×350MW
Yong'an Pumped-storage Hydro Power Station	永安抽水蓄能电站		UC	1,200	472		4×300MW

=== Wind ===
Fujian has rich resource of wind power. By 2008, there was more than 450MW of operational and underconstructed wind electricity power capacity, and this was projected to reach 3,000MW by 2020.

== See also ==
- List of power stations in China
