= Kajiwa Dam =

Dam in Sichuan, China

- Location within China
- Country: China
- Location: Kajiwa, Muli Tibetan Autonomous County, Sichuan Province
- Coordinates: 28°42′47.50″N 100°53′15.68″E
- Purpose: Power
- Status: Operational
- Construction began: 2008
- Opening date: 2014

Dam and spillways
- Type of dam: Embankment, concrete-face rock-fill
- Impounds: Muli River
- Height: 171 m (561 ft)
- Length: 323 m (1,060 ft)

Reservoir
- Total capacity: 375,000,000 m^{3} (304,000 acre⋅ft)

Kajiwa Hydropower Plant
- Coordinates: 28°39′39.96″N 100°55′12.88″E
- Commission date: 2015
- Type: Conventional, diversion
- Turbines: 4 x 110 MW, 2 x 6.2 MW Francis-type
- Installed capacity: 452.4 MW

The Kajiwa Dam is a concrete-face rock-fill dam on the Muli River near Kajiwa in Muli Tibetan Autonomous County, Sichuan Province, China.

Preliminary construction (roads, bridges, foundation work) on the dam began in 2008 and construction on the 452.4 MW power station began in August 2011. The dam began to impound its reservoir in December 2014. The first 110 MW unit was commissioned on 16 March 2015. The power station went fully operational in the end of 2015. To operate, water from the dam is sent to a power station about 6 km (3.7 mi) downstream.

== See also ==
- List of tallest dams in the world
- List of dams and reservoirs in China
- List of tallest dams in China
