= Longjiang Dam =

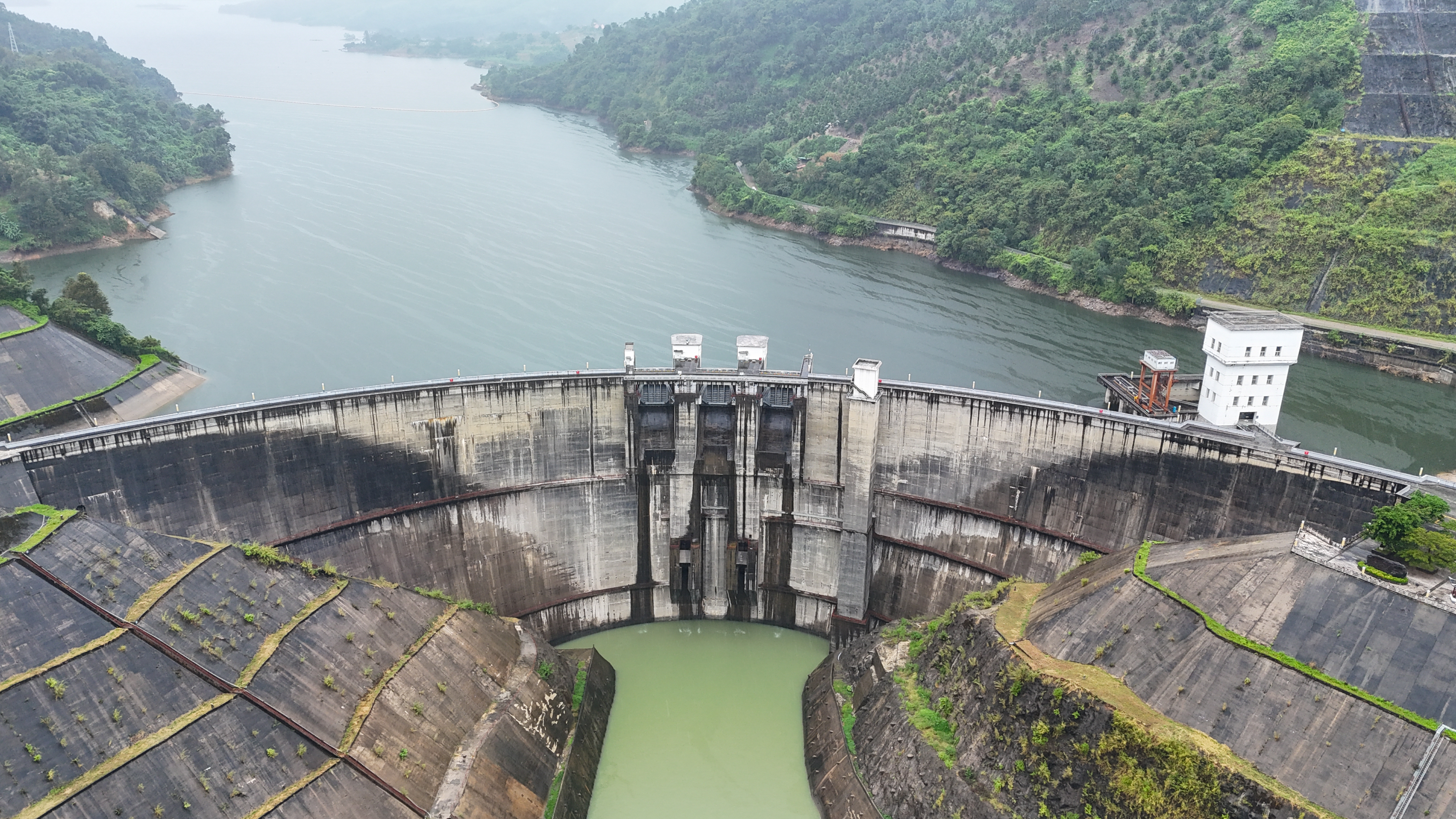

- Location within China
- Country: China
- Location: Mangshi, Dehong Prefecture, Yunnan Province
- Coordinates: 24°14′25.30″N 98°6′40.16″E
- Purpose: Power, flood control, irrigation
- Status: Operational
- Construction began: 2006
- Opening date: 2010; 16 years ago

Dam and spillways
- Impounds: Long River
- Height: 110 m (360 ft)
- Length: 472 m (1,549 ft)
- Elevation at crest: 875 m (2,871 ft)
- Width (base): 23.76 m (78.0 ft)

Reservoir
- Total capacity: 1,217,000,000 m^{3} (986,638 acre⋅ft)
- Normal elevation: 872 m (2,861 ft)

Longjiang Hydropower Plant
- Commission date: 2010
- Type: Conventional
- Turbines: 3 x 80 MW Francis-type
- Installed capacity: 240 MW

The Longjiang Dam is an arch dam on the Long River (upper of Shweli River) near Mangshi in Dehong Prefecture of Yunnan Province, China. It is a multiple-purpose project aimed at flood control, irrigation and hydroelectric power generation. Its reservoir has a storage capacity of 1,217,000,000 m^{3} (986,638 acre⋅ft), of which 679,000,000 m^{3} (550,474 acre⋅ft) is reserved for river these purposes. The dam's power station is located on its left bank and contains three 80 MW Francis turbine-generators for a total installed capacity if 240 MW. Construction on the project began on 28 November 2006 and all generators were commissioned in 2010.

== See also ==
- List of dams and reservoirs in China
- List of tallest dams in China
