= Jinpen Dam =

- Location within China
- Country: China
- Location: Zhouzhi County, Shaanxi Province
- Coordinates: 34°2′53.63″N 108°12′18.21″E
- Purpose: Irrigation, municipal water, flood control, power
- Status: Operational
- Construction began: 1996
- Opening date: 2000; 26 years ago

Dam and spillways
- Type of dam: Embankment, rock-fill earth-core
- Impounds: Weihe River
- Height: 130 m (430 ft)
- Length: 422 m (1,385 ft)
- Elevation at crest: 600 m (2,000 ft)
- Dam volume: 8,150,000 m^{3} (10,660,000 cu yd)
- Spillway type: Tunnel, uncontrolled
- Spillway capacity: 2,000 m^{3}/s (71,000 cu ft/s)

Reservoir
- Total capacity: 200,000,000 m^{3} (160,000 acre⋅ft)
- Active capacity: 177,400,000 m^{3} (143,800 acre⋅ft)
- Catchment area: 1,481 km^{2} (572 mi^{2})
- Normal elevation: 594 m (1,949 ft)

Power Station
- Commission date: 2002
- Type: Conventional
- Turbines: 2 x 12.5 MW Francis-type
- Installed capacity: 25 MW

The Jinpen Dam is a rock-fill embankment dam on the Heihe River, a tributary of the Weihe River which flows into the Yellow River, in Zhouzhi County of Shaanxi Province, China. It serves as a multi-purpose dam; providing water for irrigation and municipal uses while also affording flood control and hydroelectric power generation. Water from the reservoir is used to irrigate crops in the Weihe River valley just below the dam. Along with the Shitouhe Dam to the west, the dam supplies the nearby city of Xi'an with municipal water. The power station at the dam has an installed capacity of 25 MW. Construction on the dam began in 1998 and the river was diverted in 1998. Filling of the reservoir began in 2000 and was complete in 2001. The power station was commissioned by 2002.

== See also ==
- List of dams and reservoirs in China
- List of tallest dams in China
