= Baiyun Dam =

- Location within China
- Country: China
- Location: Chengbu Miao Autonomous County, Hunan Province
- Coordinates: 26°19′45.31″N 110°19′55.89″E
- Purpose: Power
- Status: Operational
- Construction began: 1992
- Opening date: 1999; 27 years ago

Dam and spillways
- Type of dam: Embankment, concrete-face rock-fill
- Impounds: Wushui River
- Height: 120 m (390 ft)
- Length: 189.5 m (622 ft)

Reservoir
- Total capacity: 360,000,000 m^{3} (290,000 acre⋅ft)
- Catchment area: 556 km^{2} (215 mi^{2})
- Surface area: 9.6 km^{2} (3.7 mi^{2})
- Normal elevation: 540 m (1,770 ft)

Power Station
- Installed capacity: 54 MW

The Baiyun Dam is a concrete-face rock-fill dam on the Wushui River in Chengbu Miao Autonomous County of Hunan Province, China. The dam serves to provide water for irrigation and to generate hydroelectric power. Construction on the dam started in 1992, the reservoir was impounded in 1998 and the project was complete in 1999. The reservoir has a storage capacity of 360,000,000 m^{3} (290,000 acre⋅ft) and the power station has an installed capacity of 54 MW.

== See also ==
- List of dams and reservoirs in China
- List of tallest dams in China
