= Fengshuba Dam =

- Location within China
- Country: China
- Location: Longchuan County
- Coordinates: 24°24′43″N 115°21′36″E
- Status: Operational
- Construction began: 1970
- Opening date: 1974
- Owners: Guangdong Yudean Group Co., Ltd.

Dam and spillways
- Type of dam: Concrete gravity
- Impounds: Dong River
- Height: 95.4 m (313 ft)
- Length: 400 m (1,312 ft)

Reservoir
- Total capacity: 1,932,000,000 m^{3} (1,566,298 acre⋅ft)
- Catchment area: 5,150 km^{2} (1,988 sq mi)

Power Station
- Commission date: 1973-1974
- Turbines: 2 x 75 MW Francis-type
- Installed capacity: 150 MW

The Fengshuba Dam is a concrete gravity dam on the Dong River in Longchuan County, Guangdong Province, China. The primary purpose of the dam is hydroelectric power generation and it has an installed capacity of 150 MW. Construction on the dam began in May 1970, the first generator was operational in December 1973 and the second in November 1974. The 95.4 m (313 ft) tall dam withholds a reservoir of 1,932,000,000 m^{3} (1,566,298 acre⋅ft).

== See also ==
- List of dams and reservoirs in China
- List of major power stations in Guangdong
