= List of major power stations in Henan province =

This page lists the major power stations located in Henan province.

== Non-renewable ==
=== Coal based ===
| Station | Name in Chinese | Coordinates | Capacity (MW) | Operational units and (type) | Under construction units |
|---|---|---|---|---|---|
| Qinbei Power Station | 沁北电厂 | 35°10′00″N 112°42′59″E | 4,400 | 4×600 MW, 2×1,000 MW | |
| Nanyang Guotou Power Station | 国投南阳电厂 | 33°05′12″N 111°53′53″E | 4,000 | 2×1,000 MW | 2×1,000 MW |
| Sanmengxia Power Station | 三门峡电厂 | 34°41′06″N 111°01′37″E | 2,800 | 2×300 MW, 2×600 MW, 1×1,000 MW | |
| Xinmi Power Station | 新密电厂 | 34°29′55″N 113°35′46″E | 2,600 | 2×300 MW, 2×1,000 MW | |
| Wanji Power Station | 万基控股集团电厂 | 34°44′27″N 112°03′47″E | 2,340 | 4×135 MW, 2×300 MW | 2×600 MW |
| Yuzhou Power Station | 禹州电厂 | 34°10′28″N 113°21′21″E | 2,020 | 2×350 MW, 2×660 MW | |
| Qinyang Power Station | 沁阳电厂 | 35°11′18″N 112°53′21″E | 2,000 | 2×1,000 MW | |
| Luyang Power Station | 鲁阳电厂 | 33°49′17″N 113°00′52″E | 2,000 | 2×1,000 MW | |
| Yaomeng Power Station | 姚孟电厂 | 33°44′14″N 113°14′23″E | 2,000 | 4×300 MW, 2×600 MW | |
| Shaanmei Xinyang Power Station | 陕煤信电电厂 | | 2,000 | | 2×1,000 MW |
| Xinyang Power Station | 大唐信阳电厂 | 32°06′36″N 114°08′30″E | 1,960 | 2×320 MW, 2×660 MW | |
| Yahekou Power Station | 鸭河口电厂 | 33°18′25″N 112°38′36″E | 1,900 | 2×350 MW, 2×600 MW | |
| Hebi Power Station | 鹤壁电厂 | 35°51′04″N 114°10′44″E | 1,800 | 2×300 MW, 2×600 MW | |
| Dengfeng Power Station | 登封电厂 | 34°23′33″N 113°12′00″E | 1,800 | 2×300 MW, 2×600 MW | |
| Xinxiang Baoshan Power Station | 新乡宝山电厂 | 35°19′38″N 113°29′28″E | 1,320 | 2×660 MW | |
| Huarun Jiaozuo Longyuan Power Station | 华润焦作龙源电厂 | 35°13′12″N 113°06′00″E | 1,320 | 2×660 MW | |
| Shenghua Guoneng Jiaozuo Power Station | 神华国能焦作电厂 | 35°15′35″N 113°29′57″E | 1,320 | 2×660 MW | |
| Longquan Jinheng Power Station | 龙泉金亨电力电厂 | 34°24′53″N 112°30′03″E | 1,320 | 2×660 MW | |
| Gongyi Datang Power Station | 大唐巩义电厂 | 34°47′32″N 113°06′17″E | 1,320 | 2×660 MW | |
| Longda Power Station | 隆达电厂 | 33°33′50″N 114°32′06″E | 1,320 | 2×660 MW | |
| Puyang Longfeng Power Station | 濮阳龙丰电厂 | 35°46′07″N 115°15′22″E | 1,320 | 2×660 MW | |
| Huaren Shouyangshan Power Station | 华润首阳山电厂 | 34°44′14″N 112°41′04″E | 1,320 | 2×660 MW | |
| Anyang Power Station | 安阳电厂 | 36°07′10″N 114°16′32″E | 1,200 | 4×300 MW | |
| Mengjin Power Station | 孟津电厂 | 34°51′55″N 112°31′55″E | 1,200 | 2×600 MW | |
| Xingyang Power Station | 荥阳电厂 | 34°49′30″N 113°22′01″E | 1,200 | 2×600 MW | |
| Kaifeng Thermal Power Station | 开封电厂 | 34°48′23″N 114°26′48″E | 1,200 | 2×600 MW | |
| Minquan Power Station | 民权电厂 | 34°37′06″N 115°17′34″E | 1,200 | 2×600 MW | |
| Shouyangshan Power Station | 中建电力首阳山电厂 | 34°43′53″N 112°45′21″E | 1,000 | 2×200 MW, 2×300 MW | |
| Jiaozuo Wanfang Aluminum Plant Power Station | 焦作万方铝厂自备电厂 | 35°15′01″N 113°22′12″E | 970 | 2×135 MW, 2×350 MW | |
| Zhongfu Power Station | 中孚电厂 | 34°47′32″N 113°04′39″E | 900 | 3×300 MW | |
| Yichuan No3 Power Station | 伊川第三电厂 | 34°24′47″N 112°33′01″E | 900 | 3×300 MW | |
| Luoyang Thermal Power Station | 华能洛阳热电厂 | 34°34′51″N 112°24′01″E | 700 | 2×350 MW | |
| Mianchi Thermal Power Station | 华能渑池热电厂 | 34°45′32″N 111°48′29″E | 700 | 2×350 MW | |
| Shangqiu Mingsheng Thermal Power Station | 商丘民生热电厂 | 34°28′10″N 115°42′24″E | 700 | 2×350 MW | |
| Xiangcheng Nengxing Thermal Power Station | 河南襄城能信热电厂 | 33°49′33″N 113°27′11″E | 700 | | 2×350 MW |
| Huazhou Thermal Power Station | 滑州热电厂 | 35°31′41″N 114°34′33″E | 700 | 2×350 MW | |
| Linzhou Thermal Power Station | 大唐林州热电厂 | 36°06′30″N 113°51′45″E | 700 | 2×350 MW | |
| Luohe Power Station | 漯河电厂 | 33°31′37″N 114°05′30″E | 660 | 2×330 MW | |
| Zhumadian Thermal Power Station | 驻马店热电厂 | 33°02′46″N 114°03′39″E | 660 | 2×330 MW | |
| Datang Luoyang Thermal Power Station | 大唐洛阳热电厂 | 34°40′51″N 112°23′09″E | 640 | 2×320 MW | |
| Xinxiang Yuxin Power Station | 新乡豫新电厂 | 35°24′14″N 113°55′47″E | 600 | 2×300 MW | |
| Yudong Power Station | 裕东电厂 | 33°53′09″N 116°21′50″E | 600 | 2×300 MW | |
| Zhumadian Gucheng Power Station | 驻马店古城电厂 | 32°52′18″N 114°02′36″E | 600 | 2×300 MW | |
| Puyang Thermal Power Station | 国能濮阳热电厂 | 35°45′10″N 114°59′00″E | 420 | 2×210 MW | |
| Nanyang Thermal Power Station | 中电投南阳热电厂 | 33°01′49″N 112°30′40″E | 420 | 2×210 MW | |

=== Natural gas based ===
| Station | Name in Chinese | Coordinates | Capacity (MW) | Operational units and (type) | Under construction units |
|---|---|---|---|---|---|
| Luoyang Wanzhong Jili Natural Gas Power Station | 洛阳万众吉利热电燃气电厂 | 34°54′30″N 112°37′32″E | 900 | 2×450 MW | |
| Zhengzhou Natural Gas Power Station | 郑州燃机电厂 | 34°47′49″N 113°31′39″E | 780 | 2×390 MW | |
| Zhongyuan Natural Gas Power Station | 中原燃气电厂 | 32°57′28″N 114°03′52″E | 780 | 2×390 MW | |
| Zhoukou Natural Gas Power Station | 周口燃机电厂 | 33°25′40″N 114°56′19″E | 600 | 2×300 MW | |

== Renewable ==
=== Hydroelectric ===
==== Conventional ====
| Station | Name in Chinese | Coordinates | River | Capacity (MW) | Dam height (meters) | Status | Operational units | Under construction units |
|---|---|---|---|---|---|---|---|---|
| Xiaolangdi Hydropower Station | 小浪底水利枢纽 | 34°55′31″N 112°22′20″E | Yellow River | 1,800 | 154 | Operational | 6×300 MW | |
| Sanmenxia Hydropower Station | 三门峡水利枢纽 | 34°49′52″N 111°20′42″E | Yellow River | 400 | 106 | Operational | 5×50 MW, 2×75 MW | |

==== Pumped-storage ====
| Station | Name in Chinese | Coordinates | Capacity (MW) | Rated head (meters) | Status | Operational units | Under construction units |
|---|---|---|---|---|---|---|---|
| Jiufengshan Pumped Storage Power Station | 九峰山抽水蓄能电站 | | 2,100 | 682 | UC | | 6×350 MW |
| Songxian Pumped Storage Power Station | 嵩县抽水蓄能电站 | | 1,800 | 425 | UC | | 6×300 MW |
| Luoning Dayugou Pumped Storage Power Station | 洛宁大鱼沟抽水蓄能电站 | 34°17′44″N 111°46′23″E | 1,400 | 503 | UC | | 4×350 MW |
| Lushan Pumped Storage Power Station | 鲁山花园沟抽水蓄能电站 | | 1,300 | 475 | UC | | 4×325 MW |
| Baoquan Pumped Storage Power Station | 宝泉抽水蓄能电站 | 35°28′08″N 113°28′24″E | 1,200 | 510 | Operational | 4×300 MW | |
| Tianchi Pumped Storage Power Station | 天池抽水蓄能电站 | 33°37′45″N 112°12′16″E | 1,200 | 510 | Operational | 4×300 MW | |
| Gongshang Pumped Storage Power Station | 弓上抽水蓄能电站 | | 1,200 | 410 | UC | | 4×300 MW |
| Gongyi Pumped Storage Power Station | 巩义后寺河抽水蓄能电站 | | 1,200 | 453 | UC | | 4×300 MW |
| Wuyue Pumped Storage Power Station | 五岳抽水蓄能电站 | | 1,000 | | UC | | 4×250 MW |

=== Wind ===
| Station | Name in Chinese | Coordinates | Operational capacity (MW) | Status | Units |
|---|---|---|---|---|---|
| Wugang Wind Farm | 舞钢市风电场 | 33°17′36″N 113°24′30″E | | Operational & expending | |
| Nanyang Wind Farm | 南阳风电场 | 33°05′40″N 113°11′22″E | | Operational & expending | |

=== Solar ===
| Station | Name in Chinese | Coordinates | Operational capacity (MW) | Status |
|---|---|---|---|---|
| Linzhou Solar Power Station | 林州光伏电站 | 36°13′52″N 113°52′26″E | | Operational & expending |
| Hebi Solar Power Station | 鹤壁光伏电站 | 35°59′28″N 114°08′06″E, 35°35′15″N 114°05′11″E | | Operational & expending |
| Qinyang Solar Power Station | 沁阳光伏电站 | 35°10′54″N 112°45′27″E | | Operational & expending |
| Jiyuan Solar Power Station | 济源光伏电站 | 35°11′30″N 112°33′35″E | | Operational & expending |
| Sanmengxia Solar Power Station | 三门峡光伏电站 | 34°45′12″N 111°33′30″E34°44′10″N 111°25′51″E 34°44′50″N 111°16′15″E 34°39′34″N 111°40′33″E | | Operational & expending |
| Luoning Solar Power Station | 洛宁光伏电站 | 34°28′41″N 111°39′31″E 34°22′16″N 111°29′45″E | | Operational & expending |
| Yiyang Solar Power Station | 宜阳光伏电站 | 34°28′57″N 112°07′33″E 34°28′12″N 112°06′41″E | | Operational & expending |
| Yanshi Solar Power Station | 偃师光伏电站 | 34°31′45″N 112°44′49″E | | Operational & expending |
| Gongyi Solar Power Station | 巩义光伏电站 | 34°44′26″N 113°07′57″E | | Operational & expending |
| Lankao Solar Power Station | 兰考光伏电站 | 34°57′22″N 114°51′03″E | | Operational & expending |
| Yichuan Solar Power Station | 伊川光伏电站 | 34°22′47″N 112°39′05″E 34°28′12″N 112°06′41″E | | Operational & expending |
| Ruzhou Solar Power Station | 汝州光伏电站 | 34°16′21″N 112°49′54″E | | Operational & expending |
| Ruyang Solar Power Station | 汝阳光伏电站 | 34°10′57″N 112°24′08″E | | Operational & expending |
| Yuzhou Solar Power Station | 禹州光伏电站 | 34°10′55″N 113°10′12″E34°09′33″N 113°17′45″E 34°06′41″N 113°21′09″E 34°06′37″N 113°23′20″E 34°17′37″N 113°14′01″E 34°20′01″N 113°21′27″E | | Operational & expending |
| Baofeng Solar Power Station | 宝丰光伏电站 | 33°48′40″N 112°59′40″E33°50′38″N 112°53′19″E 33°58′39″N 112°48′52″E | | Operational & expending |
| Yexian Solar Power Station | 叶县光伏电站 | 33°26′45″N 113°14′11″E | | Operational & expending |
| Fangcheng Solar Power Station | 方城县光伏电站 | 33°25′04″N 113°12′20″E33°17′56″N 112°39′18″E | | Operational & expending |
| Wugang Solar Power Station | 舞钢光伏电站 | 33°10′08″N 113°38′32″E | | Operational & expending |
| Suiping Solar Power Station | 遂平光伏电站 | 33°10′01″N 113°42′55″E33°07′23″N 113°40′48″E | | Operational & expending |
| Zhumadian Solar Power Station | 驻马店光伏电站 | 33°04′27″N 113°41′00″E | | Operational & expending |

== See also ==
- List of power stations in China
