= Shitouhe Dam =

- Location within China
- Country: China
- Location: Mei County, Shaanxi Province
- Coordinates: 34°10′10.25″N 107°39′5.25″E
- Purpose: Irrigation, municipal water, flood control, power
- Status: Operational
- Construction began: 1976
- Opening date: 1989; 37 years ago

Dam and spillways
- Type of dam: Embankment, rock-fill clay-core
- Impounds: Shitouhe River
- Height: 114 m (374 ft)
- Length: 590 m (1,940 ft)
- Width (crest): 10 m (33 ft)
- Width (base): 488 m (1,601 ft)
- Dam volume: 8,350,000 m^{3} (10,920,000 cu yd)
- Spillway type: Uncontrolled chute
- Spillway capacity: 7,150 m^{3}/s (252,000 cu ft/s)

Reservoir
- Total capacity: 147,000,000 m^{3} (119,000 acre⋅ft)
- Inactive capacity: 5,000,000 m^{3} (4,100 acre⋅ft)
- Catchment area: 673 km^{2} (260 mi^{2})
- Surface area: 1.9 km^{2} (0.73 mi^{2})

Power Station
- Commission date: 1989-1991
- Type: Conventional
- Turbines: 4 x 5 MW Francis-type
- Installed capacity: 20 MW

The Shitouhe Dam is an embankment dam on the Shitouhe River, a tributary of the Weihe River that flows into the Yellow River, in Mei County of Shaanxi Province, China. The dam serves several purposes, including flood control, hydroelectric power, water supply for irrigation, and municipal uses. The 114 m (374 ft) tall rock-fill dam can hold a reservoir of 147,000,000 m^{3} (119,000 acre⋅ft), of which 120,000,000 m^{3} (97,000 acre⋅ft) can be used to irrigate the valley below the dam. Approved by China's Ministry of Water Conservancy in 1974, construction started in June 1976. It was completed in 1989. In July 1996, the dam began to supply water to the nearby city of Xi'an. In 2002, the Jinpen Dam to the east was constructed to help provide water to the city.

== See also ==
- List of dams and reservoirs in China
- List of tallest dams in China
