= Taipingwan Dam =

- Location within China
- Official name: 太平湾水电站,태평만댐, T'aep'yŏngman Hydropower Station
- Country: China/North Korea
- Location: Dandong, China/Sinuiju, North Korea
- Coordinates: 40°21′09″N 124°44′05″E
- Purpose: Power
- Status: Operational
- Construction began: 1982
- Opening date: 1987

Dam and spillways
- Impounds: Yalu River
- Height: 31.5 m (103 ft)
- Length: 1,185 m (3,888 ft)
- Dam volume: 10,000 m^{3} (13,080 cu yd)
- Spillway type: Gate-controlled

Reservoir
- Total capacity: 100,000,000 m^{3} (81,071 acre⋅ft)

Power Station
- Commission date: 1986-1987
- Turbines: 4 x 47.5 MW Kaplan-type
- Installed capacity: 190 MW
- Annual generation: 720 GWh

The Taipingwan Dam (T'aep'yŏngman Dam) is a gravity dam on the lower Yalu River between China and North Korea. It is located about 30 km (19 mi) northeast of Dandong, Liaoning Province and Sinuiju, North Pyongan Province. The dam was first designed in 1978 and construction began in October 1982. The river was diverted in September 1983 and the first generator was operational on 25 December 1986. The three remaining generators were commissioned in 1987, and the dam was complete in July of that year. China built the dam and operates its 190 MW power station. Power from the dam is used by both China and North Korea.

== See also ==
- List of dams and reservoirs in China
