= Wiwon Dam =

- Location within China
- Official name: 위원댐,위원발전소,渭原水电站
- Country: China/North Korea
- Location: Ji'an, Jilin Province/Wiwon County, Chagang Province
- Coordinates: 40°54′05.83″N 125°58′23.77″E
- Purpose: Power
- Status: Operational
- Construction began: 1979
- Opening date: 1987

Dam and spillways
- Impounds: Yalu River
- Height: 55 m (180 ft)
- Length: 637 m (2,090 ft)
- Elevation at crest: 171 m (561 ft)
- Spillway type: Gate-controlled

Reservoir
- Total capacity: 626,000,000 m^{3} (507,506 acre⋅ft)
- Catchment area: 31,602 km^{2} (12,202 mi^{2})
- Normal elevation: 164 m (538 ft)

Power Station
- Commission date: 1987-1988
- Hydraulic head: 39 m (128 ft) (design)
- Turbines: 6 x 65 MW Francis-type
- Installed capacity: 390 MW
- Annual generation: 1200 GWh

The Wiwon Dam or Weiyuan Dam is a gravity dam on the Yalu River between China and North Korea. It is located 40 km (25 mi) southwest of Ji'an in Jilin Province, China and Wiwon in Chagang Province, North Korea. It was constructed between 1979 and 1987. The dam's six 65 MW generators were commissioned in 1987 and 1988. It is jointly owned and operated by China and North Korea.

== See also ==
- List of dams and reservoirs in China
- List of major power stations in Jilin
