= Qiaoqi Dam =

- Location within China
- Country: China
- Location: Baoxing County, Ya'an, Sichuan
- Coordinates: 30°41′31.48″N 102°44′48.44″E
- Purpose: Power
- Status: Operational
- Construction began: 2002
- Opening date: 2007; 19 years ago

Dam and spillways
- Type of dam: Embankment, rock-fill
- Impounds: Baoxinghe River
- Height: 123 m (404 ft)
- Length: 452.7 m (1,485 ft)
- Width (crest): 10 m (33 ft)
- Width (base): 450 m (1,480 ft)

Reservoir
- Total capacity: 223,000,000 m^{3} (181,000 acre⋅ft)

Qiaoqi Hydropower Station
- Coordinates: 30°32′53.31″N 102°39′7.93″E
- Commission date: 2007
- Type: Conventional, diversion
- Hydraulic head: 550 m (1,800 ft)
- Turbines: 3 x 80 MW Francis-type
- Installed capacity: 240 MW

The Qiaoqi Dam is a rock-fill embankment dam on the Baoxinghe River in Baoxing County of Sichuan Province, China. The primary purpose of the dam is hydroelectric power generation. Construction on the project began in October 2002 and its 240 MW power station was commissioned in 2007. Water from the reservoir is diverted south to the power station via a 18.676 km (11.605 mi) long head-race tunnel and penstock. The power station is located on the north bank of the main stem Baoxing River. The drop in elevation between the reservoir and power station afford a hydraulic head of about 550 m (1,800 ft).

== See also ==
- List of tallest dams in China
- List of dams and reservoirs in China
