= Gudongkou Dam =

- Location within China
- Country: China
- Location: Xingshan County, Hubei Province
- Coordinates: 31°22′2.09″N 110°45′12.09″E
- Purpose: Power, flood control
- Status: Operational
- Construction began: 1993
- Opening date: 1998; 28 years ago

Dam and spillways
- Type of dam: Embankment, concrete-face rock-fill
- Impounds: Xiangxi River
- Height: 120 m (390 ft)
- Length: 187.8 m (616 ft)
- Width (base): 332.4 m (1,091 ft)
- Dam volume: 1,880,000 m^{3} (2,460,000 cu yd)
- Spillway capacity: 1,250 m^{3}/s (44,000 cu ft/s)

Reservoir
- Total capacity: 147,000,000 m^{3} (119,000 acre⋅ft)
- Normal elevation: 203 m (666 ft)

Power Station
- Commission date: 1999-2000
- Type: Conventional
- Turbines: 3 x 15 MW Francis-type
- Installed capacity: 45 MW

The Gudongkou Dam is a concrete-face rock-fill dam on the Xiangxi River, a tributary of the Yangtze River, in Xingshan County of Hubei Province, China. It is located about 64 km (40 mi) north of the Three Gorges Dam. The dam serves to provide for flood control and hydroelectric power generation. Preliminary construction (roads, bridges, foundation) started in 1990 but official construction on the dam and power station began on 1 March 1993. The dam began to impound its reservoir in 1996 and its three generators were commissioned between 1999 and 2000.

== See also ==
- List of dams and reservoirs in China
- List of tallest dams in China
