= Yingzidu Dam =

Yingzidu
- Location within China
- Country: China
- Location: Pingba County, Guizhou Province
- Coordinates: 26°35′03″N 106°8′17″E
- Purpose: Power, flood control
- Status: Operational
- Construction began: 2000
- Opening date: 2003; 23 years ago

Dam and spillways
- Type of dam: Embankment, concrete-face rock-fill
- Impounds: Sancha River
- Height: 134.5 m (441 ft)
- Length: 276 m (906 ft)
- Elevation at crest: 1,092.5 m (3,584 ft)
- Width (crest): 10.6 m (35 ft)
- Spillway type: Controlled chute
- Spillway capacity: 8,386 m^{3}/s (296,100 cu ft/s)

Reservoir
- Total capacity: 455,000,000 m^{3} (369,000 acre⋅ft)
- Catchment area: 6,422 km^{2} (2,480 mi^{2})
- Surface area: 13.88 km^{2} (5.36 mi^{2})
- Normal elevation: 1,086 m (3,563 ft)

Yingzidu Hydropower Station
- Commission date: 2003-2004
- Type: Conventional
- Turbines: 3 x 120 MW Francis-type
- Installed capacity: 360 MW

The Yingzidu Dam is a concrete-face rock-fill dam on the Sancha River, a tributary of the Wu River, in Pingba County of Guizhou Province, China. The purpose of the dam is hydroelectric power production and flood control. It supports a 360 MW power station located just downstream. At a normal elevation of 1,086 m (3,563 ft) the reservoir withholds 455,000,000 m^{3} (369,000 acre⋅ft) but it can hold up to 531,000,000 m^{3} (430,000 acre⋅ft) in the event of a flood. The spillway on the dam can also discharge up to 8,386 m^{3}/s (296,100 cu ft/s) of water. Construction on the dam began on 8 November 2000 and on 10 April 2003 it began to impound its reservoir. On 22 May of the same year the first generator was commissioned, the second in August. By June 2004, the project was complete.

== See also ==
- List of dams and reservoirs in China
- List of tallest dams in China
