= Chengbihe Dam =

Dam in Guangxi, China

- Location within China
- Country: China
- Location: Baise City
- Coordinates: 23°57′06″N 106°38′20″E
- Status: Operational
- Construction began: 1958
- Opening date: 1961

Dam and spillways
- Type of dam: Embankment
- Impounds: Chengbihe River
- Height: 70 m (230 ft)
- Length: 425 m (1,394 ft)
- Elevation at crest: 190.4 m (625 ft)
- Width (crest): 6 m (20 ft)
- Width (base): 465 m (1,526 ft)

Reservoir
- Total capacity: 1,150,000,000 m^{3} (932,320 acre⋅ft)
- Catchment area: 2,000 km^{2} (772 sq mi)
- Surface area: 39.1 km^{2} (15 sq mi)

Power Station
- Commission date: 1966/1997
- Turbines: 4 x 7.5 MW
- Installed capacity: 30 MW

The Chengbihe Dam is an embankment dam on the Chengbihe River, a tributary of the You River. It is located 6 km (4 mi) north of Baise City in Guangxi, China. The dam was constructed between 1958 and 1961. The 70 m (230 ft) tall earth dam with a concrete core creates a 1,150,000,000 m^{3} (932,320 acre⋅ft) reservoir and supports a 30 MW power station. The original four generators were commissioned in 1966 at 6.5 MW each but were uprated to 7.5 MW in 1997.

== See also ==
- List of major power stations in Guangxi
- List of dams and reservoirs in China
