= Sinanjiang Dam =

- Location within China
- Country: China
- Location: Mojiang Hani Autonomous County, Pu'er Prefecture, Yunnan
- Coordinates: 23°5′39.78″N 101°52′20.81″E
- Purpose: Power
- Status: Operational
- Construction began: 2003
- Opening date: 2008; 18 years ago

Dam and spillways
- Type of dam: Embankment, concrete-face rock-fill
- Impounds: Sinan River
- Height: 115 m (377 ft)

Reservoir
- Total capacity: 270,000,000 m^{3} (220,000 acre⋅ft)
- Catchment area: 1,583 km^{2} (611 mi^{2})

Sinanjiang Hydropower Plant
- Coordinates: 23°4′54.55″N 101°46′30.33″E
- Commission date: 2008
- Type: Conventional, diversion
- Turbines: 3 x 67 MW Francis-type
- Installed capacity: 201 MW

The Sinanjiang Dam is a concrete-face rock-fill dam on the Sinan River, a tributary of the Lixian River, in Mojiang Hani Autonomous County of Yunnan Province, China. The primary purpose of the dam is hydroelectric power production and it supports a 201 MW power station. Construction began in October 2003 and the river was diverted around the dam site on 5 February 2005. All three generators were commissioned in 2008. To produce power, water from the reservoir is diverted around a bend in the river through a 10.3 km (6.4 mi) long headrace tunnel which connects to the power station via a penstock. The power station contains three 67 MW Francis turbine-generators.

== See also ==
- List of dams and reservoirs in China
- List of tallest dams in China
