= Maoergai Dam =

- Location within China
- Country: China
- Location: Mao County, Ngawa Prefecture, Sichuan
- Coordinates: 32°4′23.03″N 103°13′44.56″E
- Purpose: Power
- Status: Operational
- Construction began: 2006
- Opening date: 2011; 15 years ago

Dam and spillways
- Type of dam: Embankment, rock-fill
- Impounds: Heishui River
- Height: 147 m (482 ft)
- Elevation at crest: 2,138 m (7,014 ft)
- Width (crest): 12 m (39 ft)

Reservoir
- Total capacity: 535,000,000 m^{3} (434,000 acre⋅ft)

Maoergai Hydropower Station
- Coordinates: 31°58′54.90″N 103°20′7.69″E
- Commission date: 2011
- Type: Conventional
- Hydraulic head: 168 m (551 ft)
- Turbines: 3 x 140 MW Francis-type
- Installed capacity: 420 MW

The Maoergai Dam is a rock-filled embankment dam on the Heishui River in Mao County of Sichuan Province, China. The primary purpose of the dam is hydroelectric power production and it supports a 420 MW power station. Preliminary construction (roads, bridges and foundation) for the dam began in 2006 while construction on the dam and power station commenced in 2008. The generators were commissioned in 2011. To produce power, water from the reservoir is diverted to a power station downstream through a 16.15 km (10.04 mi) long headrace tunnel and penstock. The difference in elevation between the reservoir and power station affords a hydraulic head (water drop) of 168 m (551 ft). The dam sits just below the headwaters of the Heishui and water discharged through its power station regulates the flow of water for smaller power stations downstream.

== See also ==
- List of dams and reservoirs in China
- List of tallest dams in China
