= Yulongyan Dam =

- Location within China
- Country: China
- Location: Hongjiang
- Coordinates: 27°06′41″N 110°08′52″E
- Status: Operational
- Construction began: 2003
- Opening date: 2005
- Construction cost: ¥120 million yuan (US$18 million)

Dam and spillways
- Type of dam: Arch
- Impounds: Gongxi River
- Height: 96 m (315 ft)
- Length: 469 m (1,539 ft)
- Width (crest): 6 m (20 ft)

Reservoir
- Total capacity: 57,800,000 cubic metres (46,900 acre⋅ft)
- Active capacity: 39,960,000 cubic metres (32,400 acre⋅ft)
- Catchment area: 402 km^{2} (155 mi^{2})
- Normal elevation: 300 m (984 ft)

Power Station
- Commission date: 2006
- Hydraulic head: 96 m (315 ft) (max)
- Turbines: 2 x 12.5 MW Francis-type
- Installed capacity: 25 MW
- Annual generation: 65 million kWh

The Yulongyan Dam is an arch dam on the Gongxi River located 32 km (20 mi) east of Hongjiang in Hunan Province, China. The primary purpose of the dam is hydroelectric power generation but it also provides flood control and water for irrigation. Construction initially began in 1992 but work was halted due to a lack of funding. In 2003 construction began again and the dam was complete in 2005 with the power station commissioned in 2006. The 96 m (315 ft) tall dam creates a reservoir with a capacity of 57,800,000 cubic metres (46,900 acre⋅ft) and its power station has an installed capacity of 25 MW.

== See also ==
- List of dams and reservoirs in China
