= Guxian Dam =

- Location within China
- Country: China
- Location: Luoning County
- Coordinates: 34°14′24″N 111°16′38″E
- Construction began: 1978
- Opening date: 1993

Dam and spillways
- Type of dam: Concrete gravity
- Height: 125 m (410 ft)
- Length: 315 m (1,033 ft)
- Elevation at crest: 553 m (1,814 ft)
- Width (crest): 9 m (30 ft)
- Spillway type: 5 x tainter gate

Reservoir
- Total capacity: 1,175,000,000 m^{3} (952,588 acre⋅ft)
- Catchment area: 5,370 km^{2} (2,073 sq mi)

Power Station
- Commission date: 1992
- Turbines: 3 x 20 MW Francis-type
- Installed capacity: 60 MW

The Guxian Dam is a concrete gravity dam on the Luo River, a tributary of the Yellow River, in Luoning County, Henan Province, China. The primary purpose of the dam is flood control but it also generates hydroelectricity and provides water for irrigation. The 125 m (410 ft) tall dam withholds a reservoir of 1,175,000,000 m^{3} (952,588 acre⋅ft) and provides 848,000,000 m^{3} (687,485 acre⋅ft) in flood storage. The dam's power station contains three 20 MW Francis turbine-generators for a total installed capacity of 60 MW. Construction on the dam began in 1958 but was suspended several times afterwards. It recommenced in 1978 and the reservoir began to fill in 1991. The dam's generators were commissioned in 1992 and the project complete in 1993. The dam's spillway is controlled by five tainter gates and has a maximum discharge capacity of 11,436 m^{3}/s (403,859 cu ft/s). Flip buckets are used at the spillway base to dissipate water. On the right side of the spillway there are two intermediate orifice openings controlled by hydraulic press-operated radial gates. Two bottom outlets are set on the spillway's left side, also controlled by hydraulic press-operated radial gates. To the left of the bottom outlets is the power station.

== See also ==
- List of dams and reservoirs in China
- List of major power stations in Henan
