= Wudu Dam =

- Location within China
- Country: China
- Location: Jiangyou
- Coordinates: 31°55′00″N 104°46′28″E
- Status: Operational

Dam and spillways
- Type of dam: Concrete gravity
- Impounds: Fu River
- Height: 120 m (394 ft)
- Length: 727 m (2,385 ft)
- Dam volume: 1,630,000 m^{3} (2,131,960 cu yd)

Reservoir
- Total capacity: 572,000,000 m^{3} (463,728 acre⋅ft)

Power Station
- Commission date: 2008-2010
- Turbines: 3 x 50 MW Francis-type
- Installed capacity: 150 MW

The Wudu Dam is a concrete gravity dam on the Fu River located 14 km (9 mi) north of Jiangyou in Sichuan Province, China. The primary purpose of the dam is irrigation and it is part of the Sichuan Wudu Irrigated Agricultural Development Project. The dam also provides flood control and supports a 150 MW power station. Construction on the dam began on 1 November 2004 and excavation in March 2005. Pouring of roller-compacted concrete began in 2006 and the dam was completed in 2008. The last generator was commissioned in 2010. The 120 m (394 ft) tall dam creates a reservoir with a capacity of 572,000,000 m^{3} (463,728 acre⋅ft).

== See also ==
- List of dams and reservoirs in China
- List of major power stations in Sichuan
