= Hongkou Dam =

- Location within China
- Country: China
- Location: Ningde
- Coordinates: 26°53′36″N 119°19′41″E
- Status: Operational
- Construction began: 2003
- Opening date: 2008
- Owners: Fujian Hongkou Hydropower Co., Ltd.

Dam and spillways
- Type of dam: Concrete gravity
- Height: 130 m (427 ft)
- Length: 340 m (1,115 ft)
- Dam volume: 768,000 m^{3} (1,004,506 cu yd)
- Spillways: Huotong River

Reservoir
- Total capacity: 449,700,000 m^{3} (364,578 acre⋅ft)
- Catchment area: 8.9 km^{2} (3 sq mi)

Power Station
- Hydraulic head: 89 m (292 ft) (rated)
- Turbines: 2 x 100 MW Francis-type
- Installed capacity: 200 MW

The Hongkou Dam is a concrete gravity dam on the Huotong River located 32 km (20 mi) northwest of Ningde in Fujian Province, China. Constructed between 2003 and 2008, the dam serves to produce hydroelectricity. Its power station consists of two 100 MW Francis turbine-generators for an installed capacity of 200 MW. The 130 m (427 ft) tall dam was constructed with roller-compacted concrete and withholds a reservoir with a storage capacity of 449,700,000 m^{3} (364,578 acre⋅ft).

== See also ==
- List of dams and reservoirs in China
- List of major power stations in Fujian
