= Lizhou Dam =

- Location within China
- Country: China
- Location: Muli Tibetan Autonomous County, Sichuan Province
- Coordinates: 28°5′23.69″N 100°56′2.70″E
- Purpose: Power
- Status: Operational
- Construction began: 2009
- Opening date: 2015

Dam and spillways
- Type of dam: Arch, roller-compacted concrete
- Impounds: Muli River
- Height: 132 m (433 ft)
- Width (crest): 7 m (23 ft)
- Width (base): 26 m (85 ft)

Reservoir
- Total capacity: 186,900,000 m^{3} (151,500 acre⋅ft)
- Catchment area: 8,603 km^{2} (3,322 mi^{2})
- Surface area: 4.97 km^{2} (1.92 mi^{2})

Lizhou Hydropower Plant
- Coordinates: 27°58′46.35″N 101°0′11.09″E
- Commission date: 2016
- Type: Conventional, diversion
- Hydraulic head: 177 m (581 ft)
- Turbines: 3 x 115 MW, 2 x 5 MW Francis-type
- Installed capacity: 355 MW

The Lizhou Dam is a run-of-the-river hydroelectric arch dam on the Muli River in Muli Tibetan Autonomous County, Sichuan Province, China.

The primary purpose of the dam is hydroelectric power generation, with its 355 MW power station located 14.5 km to the southeast of the dam. The difference in elevation between the reservoir and power station affords a hydraulic head (water drop) of 177 m (581 ft).

Preliminary construction on the project began in 2009 and the superstructures were approved in 2011. Pouring of roller-compacted concrete for the dam began in 2012. The dam began to impound its reservoir in December 2015. Lizhou Dam started producing its power in 2016, when the whole facility was commissioned.

== See also ==
- List of dams and reservoirs in China
- List of tallest dams in China
