= Bashan Dam =

- Location within China
- Country: China
- Location: Chengkou County
- Coordinates: 32°06′11″N 108°27′44″E
- Status: Operational
- Construction began: 2005
- Opening date: 2009
- Owners: Chongqing Bashan Hydropower Development Co., Ltd.

Dam and spillways
- Type of dam: Embankment, concrete-face rock-fill
- Impounds: Renhe River
- Height: 155 m (509 ft)
- Length: 477 m (1,565 ft)
- Elevation at crest: 685 m (2,247 ft)
- Width (crest): 12 m (39 ft)
- Dam volume: 5,500,000 m^{3} (7,193,728 cu yd)

Reservoir
- Total capacity: 315,000,000 m^{3} (412,004,445 cu yd)
- Catchment area: 1,712 km^{2} (661 mi^{2})
- Surface area: 5.72 km^{2} (2 mi^{2})

Power Station
- Commission date: 2009
- Turbines: 2 x 70 MW Pelton-type
- Installed capacity: 140 MW
- Annual generation: 449 GWh

The Bashan Dam is an embankment dam on the Renhe River located 15 km (9 mi) northwest of Chengkou County's seat in Chongqing, China. The primary purpose of the dam is hydroelectric power generation and it supports a 140 MW power station containing two 70 MW Pelton turbine generators. It is a concrete-face rock-fill type with a height of 155 m (509 ft); creating a reservoir with a capacity of 315,000,000 m^{3} (412,004,445 cu yd). The dam is located before a bend in the river and diverts water through a 2,181 m (7,156 ft) long headrace tunnel that leads to the power station. Construction on the project began in 2005, the river was diverted by 2006 and the generators were operational in 2009.

== See also ==
- List of dams and reservoirs in China
- List of major power stations in Chongqing
- Bashanosaurus
