= Jiudianxia Dam =

- Location within China
- Country: China
- Location: Jonê County
- Coordinates: 34°55′26″N 103°49′58″E
- Status: Operational
- Construction began: 2005
- Opening date: 2008
- Construction cost: US$410 million

Dam and spillways
- Type of dam: Embankment, concrete-face rock-fill
- Impounds: Tao River
- Height: 136.5 m (448 ft)
- Elevation at crest: 2,206 m (7,238 ft)
- Dam volume: 2,800,000 m^{3} (3,662,262 cu yd)

Reservoir
- Total capacity: 943,000,000 m^{3} (764,503 acre⋅ft)
- Normal elevation: 2,202 m (7,224 ft)

Power Station
- Commission date: 2008
- Turbines: 3 x 100 MW Francis-type
- Installed capacity: 300 MW
- Annual generation: 994 million kWh

The Jiudianxia Dam is a concrete-face rock-fill dam on the Tao River in Jonê County, Gansu Province, China. The dam was constructed to conserve water and produce hydroelectricity. The 136.5 m (448 ft) tall dam withholds a reservoir of 943,000,000 m^{3} (764,503 acre⋅ft) and its power station has an installed capacity of 300 MW. Construction on the dam began in 2005 and it was complete in 2008.

== See also ==
- List of dams and reservoirs in China
- List of major power stations in Gansu
