= Jishixia Dam =

- Location within China
- Coordinates: 35°49′42″N 102°42′23″E
- Status: Under construction
- Construction began: 2005

Dam and spillways
- Impounds: Yellow River
- Height: 101 m (331 ft)

Reservoir
- Creates: Jishixia Reservoir
- Total capacity: 263,500,000 m^{3} (213,600 acre⋅ft)

Power Station
- Turbines: 3 x 340 MW Francis turbines
- Installed capacity: 1,020 MW

The Jishixia Dam is a concrete face rock-fill embankment dam on the Yellow River in Qinghai Province, China. It is 101 m (331 ft) tall and downstream from the Gongboxia Dam. The purpose of the dam is hydroelectric power generation and flood control. The dam supports a power station with 3 x 340 MW Francis turbines for a total installed capacity of 1,020 MW. Construction on the dam began in 2005 and the river was diverted in March 2007. The first generator was operational in mid-2010 and the rest by the end of the year.

== See also ==
- List of power stations in China
