= Jinshuitan Dam =

- Location within China
- Country: China
- Location: Lishui
- Coordinates: 28°12′45″N 119°32′11″E
- Status: Operational
- Construction began: 1981
- Opening date: 1986

Dam and spillways
- Type of dam: Arch
- Impounds: Longquan Creek
- Height: 102 m (335 ft)
- Width (crest): 5 m (16 ft)
- Width (base): 24.6 m (81 ft)
- Spillways: 2
- Spillway type: Shallow and intermediate levels on each, flip-bucket dissipation
- Spillway capacity: Shallow: 3,122 m^{3}/s (110,252 cu ft/s); Intermediate: 2,638 m^{3}/s (93,160 cu ft/s)

Reservoir
- Creates: Xiangong Lake
- Total capacity: 13,930,000,000 m^{3} (11,290,000 acre⋅ft)
- Catchment area: 2,761 km^{2} (1,066 sq mi)
- Surface area: 34 km (21 mi)
- Maximum length: 66 km (41 mi)
- Normal elevation: 184 m (604 ft)

Power Station
- Operator: Zhejiang Provincial Electric Bureau
- Commission date: 1987-1988
- Turbines: 6 x 50 MW Francis-type
- Installed capacity: 300 MW
- Annual generation: 490 GWh

The Jinshuitan Dam is an arch dam on Longquan Creek, a tributary of the Oujiang River in Zhejiang Province, China. It is located about 47 km (29 mi) southwest of Lishui. The dam and power station were completed in 1988 and serve several purposes to include hydroelectric power generation, water supply, flood control and navigation. It is the first dam of the Oujiang River cascade to be constructed and creates the second largest lake in Zhejiang.

== Background ==
Construction on the dam began in October 1981 and the river was closed the same month in 1983. In 1986, the reservoir began filling and reached conservation storage level. On 7 April 1987, the first generator went online and by 31 December 1988, the other three generators in the power station were commissioned.

== Design ==
The dam is a double-curvature (variable radius) type with a height of 102 m (335 ft), crest width of 5 m (16 ft) and base width of 24.6 m (81 ft). Sitting at the head of a 2,761 km^{2} (1,066 sq mi) catchment area, the dam creates Xiangong Lake which has a capacity of 13,930,000,000 m^{3} (11,290,000 acre⋅ft). The lake covers a surface area of 34 km (21 mi) and is 66 km (41 mi) in length. The dam has two spillways that lie on either side of the power station. Each spillway has a shallow and an intermediate opening. The shallow openings have a maximum discharge of 3,122 m^{3}/s (110,252 cu ft/s) while the intermediate can discharge 2,638 m^{3}/s (93,160 cu ft/s). The power station is located at the base of the dam and contains the six 50 MW Francis turbine-generators which are each supplied with water via a 4.5 m (15 ft) diameter penstock. Between the power station and the east spillway, there is a boat/raft lift to move small vessels and lumber from the river below into the reservoir.

== See also ==
- List of dams and reservoirs in China
- List of major power stations in Zhejiang
