= Tankeng Dam =

- Location within China
- Country: China
- Location: Qingtian
- Coordinates: 28°07′05″N 120°02′04″E
- Status: Operational
- Construction began: 2003
- Opening date: 2008

Dam and spillways
- Type of dam: Embankment, concrete-face rock-fill
- Impounds: Ou River
- Height: 162 m (531 ft)
- Length: 507 m (1,663 ft)

Reservoir
- Total capacity: 4,190,000,000 m^{3} (3,396,888 acre⋅ft)
- Surface area: 70.93 km^{2} (27 sq mi)

Power Station
- Commission date: 2008-2009
- Turbines: 3 x 200 MW Francis-type
- Installed capacity: 600 MW

The Tankeng Dam is a concrete-face rock-fill embankment dam on the Ou River located 24 km (15 mi) west of Qingtian, Zhejiang Province, China. The main purpose of the dam is hydroelectric power generation but it also provides for flood control, irrigation, and tourism. The 162 m (531 ft) tall dam creates a reservoir with a maximum capacity of 4,190,000,000 m^{3} (3,396,888 acre⋅ft). The power station contains 3 x 200 MW Francis turbine-generators for a total installed capacity of 600 MW. The dam was planned beginning in the early 1980s and approved in May 2003. Construction on the dam began that same year and in April 2008, the dam began to impound the river. On 15 August 2008, the first generator became operational, the second on 12 January 2009 and the third on 10 July 2009.

During construction, ten towns and eighty villages were submerged and over fifty thousand people were relocated.

== See also ==
- List of dams and reservoirs in China
- List of tallest dams in the world
- List of major power stations in Zhejiang
