= Tengzigou Dam =

- Location within China
- Country: China
- Location: Shizhu County
- Coordinates: 30°04′06″N 108°13′24″E
- Construction began: 2002
- Opening date: 2006

Dam and spillways
- Type of dam: Arch
- Impounds: Dragon River
- Height: 127 m (417 ft)
- Length: 339 m (1,112 ft)

Reservoir
- Total capacity: 193,000,000 m^{3} (156,468 acre⋅ft)
- Catchment area: 607 km^{2} (234 sq mi)

Power Station
- Commission date: 2005
- Turbines: 2 x 35 MW
- Installed capacity: 70 MW

The Tengzigou Dam is an arch dam on the Dragon River, a tributary of the Yangtze River, in Shizhu County, Chongqing, China. Construction on the dam began in 2006, the first generator was operational in 2005 and the project was complete in 2006. The dam supports a 70 MW hydroelectric power station.

== See also ==
- List of dams and reservoirs in China
