= Sanbanxi Dam =

- Location within China
- Country: China
- Location: Jinping County, Guizhou Province
- Coordinates: 26°36′21″N 109°02′54″E
- Status: In use
- Construction began: 2001
- Opening date: 2006

Dam and spillways
- Type of dam: Embankment, concrete face rock-fill
- Impounds: Yuan (Qingshui) River
- Height: 185.5 metres (609 ft)
- Length: 423.75 metres (1,390 ft)
- Dam volume: 8,280,000 metres (27,165,354 ft)
- Spillways: 3
- Spillway type: Service, gate-controlled chute on crest
- Spillway capacity: 13,100 cubic metres per second (462,622 cu ft/s) (max)

Reservoir
- Creates: Sanbanxi Reservoir
- Total capacity: 4,094,000,000 m^{3} (3,319,060 acre⋅ft)

Power Station
- Turbines: 4 x 250 MW
- Installed capacity: 1,000 MW
- Annual generation: 2.428 billion kWh

The Sanbanxi Dam is a concrete face rock-fill embankment dam on the Yuan (Qingshui) River in Jinping County, Guizhou Province, China. The dam houses a hydroelectric power station with 4 x 250 MW generators for a total installed capacity of 1,000 MW. Construction began in 2001 and was complete by 2006.

== See also ==
- List of power stations in China
- List of dams and reservoirs in China
