= Songtao Reservoir =

Songtao Reservoir Dam
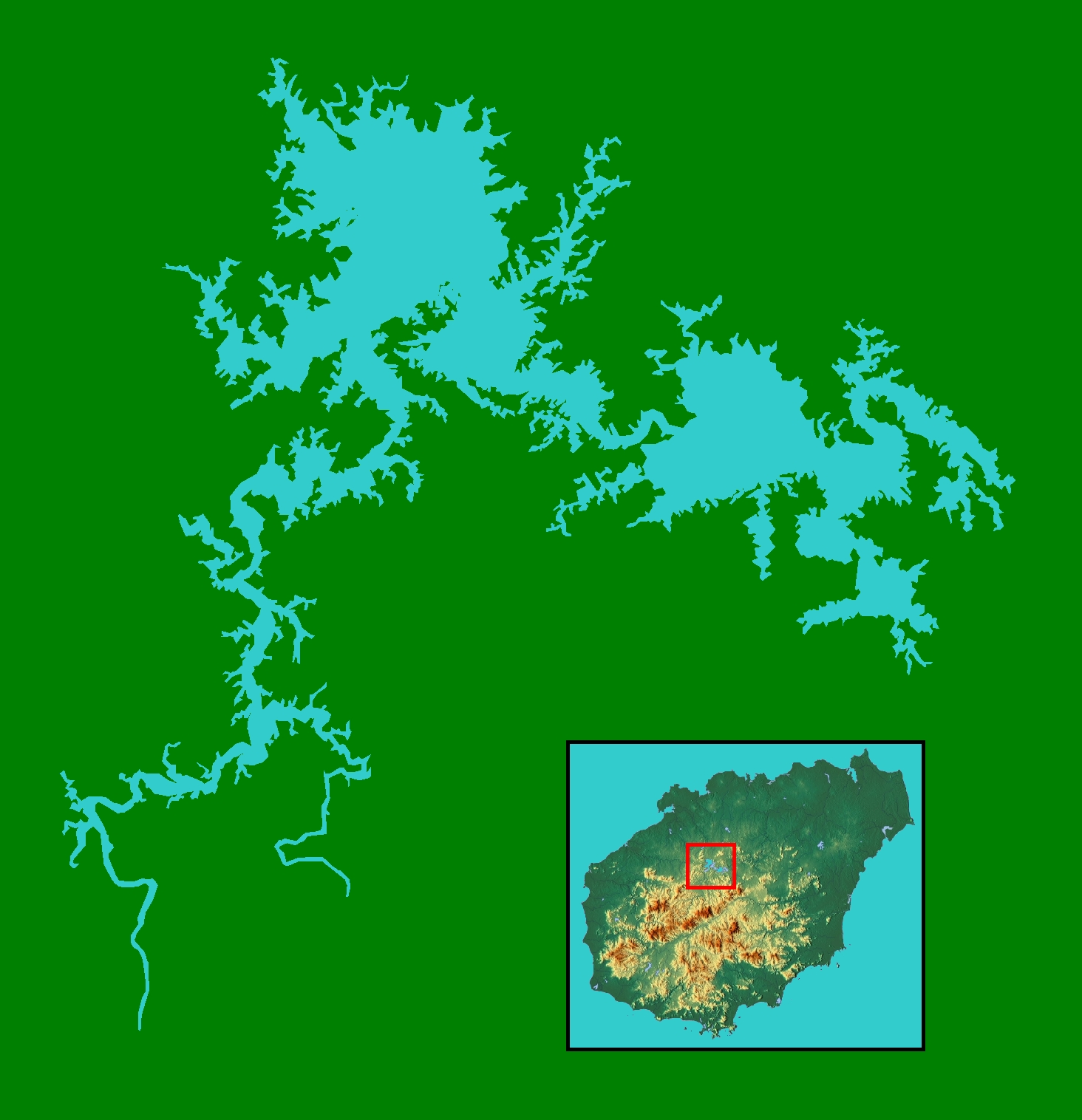
- Map showing the Songtao Reservoir (Greenfield Reservoir)

- Location within China
- Country: China
- Location: Hainan
- Coordinates: 19°19′57″N 109°40′44″E
- Construction began: 1958
- Opening date: 1969

Dam and spillways
- Impounds: Nandu River
- Height: 80.7 m (265 ft)
- Length: 760 m (2,490 ft)

Reservoir
- Creates: Songtao Reservoir; Songtao Reservoir Irrigation Area (Code BHF60000181)
- Total capacity: 3,070,000,000 m^{3} (2,490,000 acre⋅ft)
- Surface area: 58.66 km^{2} (22.65 sq mi)

The Songtao Reservoir (Chinese: 松涛水库; pinyin: Sōngtāo Shuǐkù), also known as the Songtao Reservoir Irrigation Area, is the largest body of water in Hainan, and the second largest reservoir in China.

Located upstream of the Nandu River approximately 20 kilometres (12 mi) southeast of Danzhou City, the reservoir covers 0.17 percent of the island and has a total capacity of 3,340,000,000 cubic metres (1.18×10^{11} cu ft). The reservoir contains more than 100 islands, and is used for agriculture, fisheries, and tourism.
