= Nierji Dam =

- Location within China
- Country: China
- Location: Morin Dawa Daur Autonomous Banner
- Coordinates: 48°29′31″N 124°31′38″E
- Status: Operational
- Construction began: 2001
- Opening date: 2006

Dam and spillways
- Type of dam: Embankment, rock-fill
- Impounds: Nen River
- Height: 41.5 m (136 ft)
- Length: 7,180 m (23,556 ft)
- Spillway capacity: 20,300 m^{3}/s (716,888 cu ft/s)

Reservoir
- Total capacity: 8,610,000,000 m^{3} (6,980,241 acre⋅ft)
- Catchment area: 66,400 km^{2} (25,637 sq mi)

Power Station
- Commission date: May 2005
- Turbines: 4 x 62.5 MW Kaplan-type
- Installed capacity: 250 MW

The Nierji Dam (Chinese: 尼尔基水利枢纽) is an embankment dam on the Nen River just north of Morin Dawa and on the border of Inner Mongolia and Heilongjiang Province, China. The dam was constructed between 2001 and 2006 for several purposes to include hydroelectric power generation, flood control, navigation and water supply.

== Design ==
The dam is a rock-fill type and 41.5 m (136 ft) tall at its highest point. The total length of the dam is 7,180 m (23,556 ft) which includes the 1,676 m (5,499 ft) long main dam with an asphalt core. The dam creates a reservoir with a capacity of 8,610,000,000 m^{3} (6,980,241 acre⋅ft) and sits at the head of a 66,400 km^{2} (25,637 sq mi) catchment area. The dam's spillway consists of 11 floodgates and has a maximum discharge capacity of 20,300 m^{3}/s (716,888 cu ft/s). The dam's power station contains four 62.5 MW Kaplan turbine-generators for a total installed capacity of 250 MW.
