= Longshou II Dam =

- Location within China
- Country: China
- Location: Zhangye
- Coordinates: 38°45′24″N 100°06′03″E
- Status: Operational
- Construction began: 2002
- Opening date: 2004
- Construction cost: $153 million USD
- Owners: Gansu Hexi Hydropower Development Investment Co., Ltd.

Dam and spillways
- Type of dam: Embankment, concrete-face rock-fill
- Impounds: Heihe River
- Height: 146.5 m (481 ft)
- Length: 191 m (627 ft)
- Elevation at crest: 1,924.5 m (6,314 ft)
- Dam volume: 2,530,000 m^{3} (3,309,115 cu yd)
- Spillway type: Controlled chute
- Spillway capacity: 2,696 m^{3}/s (95,208 cu ft/s)

Reservoir
- Total capacity: 86,200,000 m^{3} (69,883 acre⋅ft)
- Normal elevation: 1,920 m (6,299 ft)

Power Station
- Commission date: 2004
- Turbines: 3 x 45 MW; 1 x 22 MW; Francis-type
- Installed capacity: 157 MW
- Annual generation: 528 GWh

The Longshou II Dam, also referred to as Longshou No. 2, is a concrete-face rock-fill dam on the Heihe River, located 35 km (22 mi) southwest of Zhangye in Gansu Province, China. It is part of the Gansu Heihe Rural Hydropower Development and supports a 157 MW power station. The dam's first feasibility study was carried out in 2000 and river diversion construction began in December 2001. In June 2002, the river was diverted and in September that year, filling of the dam's body began. On 17 August 2004, the first generator was operational with the rest by the end of the year. The 146.5 m (481 ft) high dam withholds a reservoir with a capacity of 86,200,000 m^{3} (69,883 acre⋅ft). It's spillway is located on the right bank and is a controlled chute type with a discharge capacity of 2,696 m^{3}/s (95,208 cu ft/s). Water is delivered to the dam's power station downstream via a 1.7 km (1 mi) long tunnel. The dam is located upstream of the Longshou I Dam, an 80 m (262 ft) tall double-curvature arch dam with an installed capacity of 52 MW. Upstream is the Xiaogushan Dam, a gravity dam which diverts water to a 102 MW power station.

== See also ==
- List of dams and reservoirs in China
- List of major power stations in Gansu
