= Jiemian Dam =

- Location within China
- Country: China
- Location: Youxi County, Fujian Province
- Coordinates: 25°56′17.58″N 118°2′36.99″E
- Purpose: Power
- Status: Operational
- Construction began: 2002
- Opening date: 2007; 19 years ago

Dam and spillways
- Type of dam: Embankment, concrete-face rock-fill
- Impounds: Junxi River
- Height: 126 m (413 ft)
- Length: 500.5 m (1,642 ft)

Reservoir
- Total capacity: 1,824,000,000 m^{3} (1,479,000 acre⋅ft)

Power Station
- Commission date: 2007-2008
- Type: Conventional
- Turbines: 2 x 150 MW Francis-type
- Installed capacity: 300 MW

The Jiemian Dam is a concrete-face rock-fill dam on the Junxi River in Youxi County of Fujian Province, China. The primary purpose of the dam is hydroelectric power generation and it supports a 300 MW power station. Construction on the dam began in 2002, the reservoir was impounded by 17 February 2007 and on 28 November 2007, the first 150 MW generator was commissioned. The second was commissioned in 2008.

== See also ==
- List of dams and reservoirs in China
- List of tallest dams in China
