= Hunanzhen Dam =

Dam on the Qiantang River, located south of Quzhou in Zhejiang Province, China

- Location within China
- Country: China
- Coordinates: 28°41′23″N 118°50′10″E
- Status: Operational
- Construction began: 1958
- Opening date: 1980

Dam and spillways
- Type of dam: Concrete buttress/gravity
- Impounds: Qiantang River
- Height: 129 m (423 ft)
- Length: 440 m (1,444 ft)
- Elevation at crest: 242 m (794 ft)
- Width (crest): 7 m (23 ft)
- Width (base): 11.84 m (39 ft)

Reservoir
- Total capacity: 2,067,000,000 m^{3} (1,675,744 acre⋅ft)
- Catchment area: 2,197 km^{2} (848 sq mi)
- Normal elevation: 230 m (755 ft)

Power Station
- Commission date: 1979/2006
- Turbines: 4 x 42.5 MW; 1 x 100 MW; Francis-type
- Installed capacity: 270 MW

The Hunanzhen Dam is a trapezoidal buttress dam on the Qiantang River, located 27 km (17 mi) south of Quzhou in Zhejiang Province, China. The primary purpose of the dam is hydroelectric power generation but it also serves to provide for flood control and irrigation water supply. Construction on the dam began in 1958 but was halted in 1961. It recommenced in 1970, the first generator was operational in 1979 and the project complete in 1980. The original installed capacity of the dam's power plant was 170 MW but the plant was expanded with an additional 100 MW generator, commissioned in 2006.

== Design ==
The dam is a 129 m (423 ft) tall and 440 m (1,444 ft) wide trapezoidal buttress dam, much like a gravity dam but thinner and with buttresses. The dam's crest is 7 m (23 ft) wide while the base wall is 11.84 m (39 ft) wide. The dam has 18 buttresses with the spillway section located in the center. The dam's crest sits at an elevation of 242 m (794 ft) above sea level and the spillway's crest is 223 m (732 ft) above sea level. The spillway is controlled by five radial gates and within the center four of the six piers supporting the spillway chutes are four outlets. The maximum discharge capacity of the spillway and outlets is 10,600 m^{3}/s (374,335 cu ft/s). The dam sits at the head of a 2,197 km^{2} (848 sq mi) catchment area and withholds a reservoir of 2,067,000,000 m^{3} (1,675,744 acre⋅ft). The dam's power stations are located downstream around the natural river bend and water is supplied via a 1.4 km (1 mi) tunnel. The original power house contains four 42.5 MW Francis turbine-generators and the expansion power house, located just downstream, contains one 100 MW Francis turbine-generator.

== See also ==
- List of dams and reservoirs in China
- List of major power stations in Zhejiang
