= Baozhusi Dam =

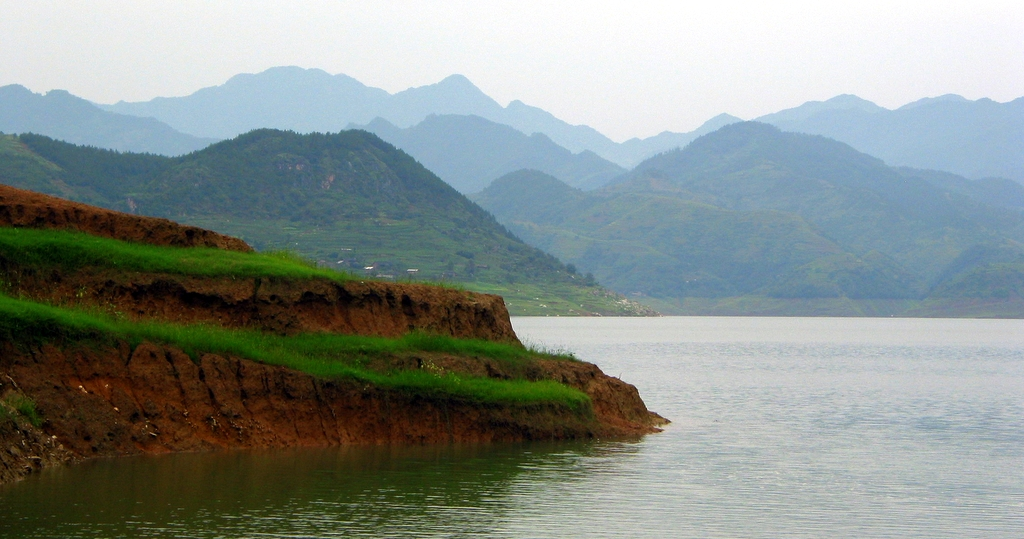
- The dam's reservoir, Bailong Lake

- Location within China
- Country: China
- Location: Guangyuan
- Coordinates: 32°31′11″N 105°36′37″E
- Status: Operational
- Construction began: 1984
- Opening date: 2000

Dam and spillways
- Type of dam: Concrete gravity
- Impounds: Bailong River
- Height: 132 m (433 ft)
- Length: 524 m (1,719 ft)
- Elevation at crest: 595 m (1,952 ft)
- Dam volume: 2,310,000 m^{3} (3,021,366 cu yd)
- Spillway capacity: 16,060 m^{3}/s (567,154 cu ft/s)

Reservoir
- Creates: White Dragon Lake
- Total capacity: 2,550,000,000 m^{3} (2,067,319 acre⋅ft)
- Catchment area: 28,428 km^{2} (10,976 sq mi)
- Surface area: 61.2 km^{2} (24 sq mi)
- Maximum length: 67 km (42 mi)
- Normal elevation: 588 m (1,929 ft)

Power Station
- Commission date: 1996-1997
- Hydraulic head: 103 m (338 ft) (max)
- Turbines: 4 x 175 MW Francis-type
- Installed capacity: 700 MW
- Annual generation: 2,278 GWh

The Baozhusi Dam is a gravity dam on the Bailong River, located 23 km (14 mi) northwest of Guangyuan in Sichuan Province, China. Construction on the dam began in 1984, the generators were operational between 1996 and 1998 while the rest of the facilities were complete 2000. The dam was constructed for hydroelectric power generation, flood control and water supply for irrigation and industrial uses. The 132 m (433 ft) tall concrete gravity dam creates a 2,550,000,000 m^{3} (2,067,319 acre⋅ft) reservoir with a surface area of 61.2 km^{2} (24 sq mi). On either side of power station at the dam's base, there are two gate-controlled chute spillways. Beside them are two pairs of intermediate sluice-controlled orifice openings. Below the left intermediate opening are two bottom sluices. The total discharge capacity of the spillways and openings is 16,060 m^{3}/s (567,154 cu ft/s). The dam's power station contains 4 x 175 MW Francis turbine-generators which are afford a maximum hydraulic head of 103 m (338 ft) given the dam's height.

== See also ==
- List of dams and reservoirs in China
- List of major power stations in Sichuan
