= Quxue Dam =

- Location within China
- Country: China
- Location: Dêrong County, Garzê Tibetan Autonomous Prefecture, Sichuan
- Coordinates: 28°25′20.91″N 99°19′23.64″E
- Purpose: Power
- Status: Operational
- Construction began: 2013
- Opening date: 2016

Dam and spillways
- Type of dam: Embankment, rock-fill with asphalt concrete core
- Impounds: Shoqu River
- Height: 164.2 m (539 ft)
- Length: 219.85 m (721.3 ft)
- Width (crest): 15 m (49 ft)

Reservoir
- Total capacity: 132,600,000 m^{3} (107,500 acre⋅ft)

Power Station
- Commission date: 2016
- Type: Conventional
- Turbines: 2 x 123 MW Francis-type
- Installed capacity: 246 MW

The Quxue Dam is a 174 m (571 ft)-tall rock-fill embankment dam on the Shuoqu River in Dêrong County of Sichuan Province, China.

the Quxue Dam has a narrow canyon with very steep abutments supporting its superstructure.

The primary purpose of the dam is hydroelectric power generation and it supports a 246 MW power station.

== Design and construction ==
The dam is situated in a deep canyon which has an asymmetrical “V” shape. The slope of the left and right banks is around 70°, getting steeper towards the top. Made of mobile sediment, the depth of the alluvial river overburden (waste and spoil) is around 30 m (98 ft) at the dam site.

The crest length of the dam is 220 m (720 ft) with the crest width being 15 m (49 ft) across. The dam was designed to have a slope of 1.9H:1V upstream and an average slope of 1.85H:1V downstream.

Construction on the dam began in 2013 and the river was diverted around the construction site in February 2014. The power station was completed in 2016.

== See also ==
- List of dams and reservoirs in China
