= Baise Dam =

- Location within China
- Country: China
- Location: Baise City
- Coordinates: 23°55′34″N 106°27′21″E
- Status: Operational
- Construction began: 2000
- Opening date: 2006

Dam and spillways
- Type of dam: Gravity
- Impounds: You River
- Height: 130 m (427 ft)
- Length: 720 m (2,362 ft)
- Dam volume: 2,672,000 m^{3} (3,494,844 cu yd)

Reservoir
- Total capacity: 5,660,000,000 m^{3} (4,588,637 acre⋅ft)

Power Station
- Turbines: 4 x 135 MW Francis-type
- Installed capacity: 540 MW
- Annual generation: 1,690 GWh

The Baise Dam is a gravity dam on the You River located 16 km (10 mi) west of Baise City in Guangxi, China. The dam was constructed between 2000 and 2006. The 130 m (427 ft) tall dam was constructed with roller-compacted concrete and creates a 5,660,000,000 m^{3} (4,588,637 acre⋅ft) reservoir. The dam's power station contains four 135 MW Francis turbine generators for a total installed capacity of 540 MW and average annual generation of 1,690 GWh.

== See also ==
- List of major power stations in Guangxi
- List of dams and reservoirs in China
