= Dongqing Dam =

- Location within China
- Location: Zhenfeng County
- Coordinates: 25°31′38.6″N 105°45′57.1″E
- Construction began: 2005
- Opening date: 2009
- Owner: China Huidan Corporation

Dam and spillways
- Type of dam: Embankment, concrete-face rock-fill
- Impounds: Beipan River
- Height: 150 m (492 ft)
- Length: 678 m (2,224 ft)
- Dam volume: 9,500,000 m^{3} (12,425,531 cu yd)

Reservoir
- Total capacity: 955,000,000 m^{3} (774,231 acre⋅ft)

Power Station
- Commission date: 2009-2010
- Turbines: 4 x 220 MW
- Installed capacity: 880 MW
- Annual generation: 3,100 GWh

The Dongqing Dam, also spelled Dongjing, is a concrete face rock-fill dam on the Beipan River bordering Zhenning and Zhenfeng County 20 km (12 mi) northeast of Zhenfeng County's seat in Guizhou Province, China. The 150 m (492 ft) tall concrete-face rock-fill dam withholds a reservoir of 955,000,000 m^{3} (774,231 acre⋅ft) and supports an 880 MW hydroelectric power station. Construction began in 2005, the river was diverted in 2006, the dam began to impound the reservoir in 2009 and the first generator was commissioned that same year.

== See also ==
- List of dams and reservoirs in China
- List of major power stations in Guizhou
