= Wuluwati Dam =

- Location within China
- Country: China
- Location: Hotan County
- Coordinates: 36°49′28″N 79°27′04″E
- Status: Operational
- Construction began: 1993
- Opening date: 2001

Dam and spillways
- Type of dam: Embankment, concrete-face rock-fill
- Impounds: Karakash River
- Height: 138 m (453 ft)
- Length: 365 m (1,198 ft)
- Elevation at crest: 1,965 m (6,447 ft)
- Dam volume: 6,770,000 m^{3} (8,854,826 cu yd)
- Spillway type: Controlled chute

Reservoir
- Total capacity: 347,000,000 m^{3} (281,317 acre⋅ft)
- Surface area: 13 km^{2} (5 sq mi)
- Maximum length: 23.5 km (15 mi)
- Maximum width: 700 m (2,297 ft)
- Normal elevation: 1,962 m (6,437 ft)

Power Station
- Commission date: 2000-2001
- Hydraulic head: 106 m (348 ft)
- Turbines: 4 x 15 MW Francis-type
- Installed capacity: 60 MW
- Annual generation: 189 GWh

The Wuluwati Dam (Chinese: 乌鲁瓦提水利枢纽工程) is a concrete-face rock-fill dam on the Karakash River in Hotan County, Xinjiang, China. The dam serves to provide water supply, hydroelectric power generation and recreation. Construction began in 1993 with the river's diversion and in 1995, construction on the dam began. The first two generators were operational in December 2000 and the last two in January 2001. The 138 m (453 ft) tall dam withholds a reservoir of 347,000,000 m^{3} (281,317 acre⋅ft). The dam's power station contains four 15 MW Francis turbine-generators.

== See also ==
- List of dams and reservoirs in China
- List of major power stations in Xinjiang
