= Shiyazi Dam =

- Location within China
- Official name: 石垭子水电站
- Country: China
- Location: Wuchuan County
- Coordinates: 28°39′07″N 107°58′05″E
- Status: Operational
- Construction began: 2007
- Opening date: 2010
- Owners: Guizhou Zhongshui Energy Co., Ltd

Dam and spillways
- Type of dam: Concrete gravity
- Impounds: Hongjiadu River
- Height: 134.5 m (441 ft)
- Elevation at crest: 547 m (1,795 ft)
- Width (crest): 7 m (23 ft)
- Width (base): 28 m (92 ft)

Reservoir
- Total capacity: 321,500,000 m^{3} (260,644 acre⋅ft)
- Catchment area: 2,589 km^{2} (1,000 sq mi)
- Surface area: 8 km^{2} (3 sq mi)
- Normal elevation: 544 m (1,785 ft)

Power Station
- Commission date: 2010
- Turbines: 2 x 70 MW Francis-type
- Installed capacity: 140 MW
- Annual generation: 478 GWh

The Shiyazi Dam is a concrete gravity dam on the Hongjiadu River, a tributary of the Wu River, in Wuchuan County, Guizhou Province, China. The primary purpose of the dam is hydroelectric power generation. Construction on the dam began in 2007 and concrete pouring in April 2008. The reservoir began to impound in September 2010. The dam was "capped off" with concrete on 24 December 2011 and the generators were commissioned a week later on 31 December. The dam, being located in a steep portion of Meilin Canyon, was difficult to construct. The 134.5 m (441 ft) tall dam withholds a reservoir with a capacity of 321,500,000 m^{3} (260,644 acre⋅ft) and was constructed with both normal concrete and roller-compacted concrete. The dams power station is located 320 m (1,050 ft) downstream and contains two 70 MW Francis turbine-generators for an installed capacity of 140 MW.

== See also ==
- List of dams and reservoirs in China
- List of major power stations in Guizhou
