= Wawushan Dam =

- Location within China
- Country: China
- Location: Ya'an
- Coordinates: 29°40′22″N 103°02′15″E
- Status: Operational
- Construction began: 2003
- Opening date: 2007
- Owners: Sichuan Wawushan Power Industrial Co., Ltd.

Dam and spillways
- Type of dam: Embankment, concrete-face rock-fill
- Impounds: Zhougonghe River
- Height: 138 m (453 ft)
- Length: 277 m (909 ft)
- Dam volume: 3,500,000 m^{3} (4,577,827 cu yd)

Reservoir
- Total capacity: 545,000,000 m^{3} (441,839 acre⋅ft)

Power Station
- Commission date: 2008
- Turbines: 2 x 130 MW Francis-type
- Installed capacity: 260 MW

The Wawushan Dam is a concrete-face rock-fill dam on the Zhougonghe River in Hongya County, Sichuan Province, China. It is located 34 km (21 mi) south of Ya'an. The primary purpose of the dam is hydroelectric power generation and it supports a 260 MW power station. Construction began on 28 February 2003 and on 10 April 2007, the dam began to impound its reservoir. On 8 January 2008, the first generator became operational, and the second followed on 4 February 2008. The 138 m (453 ft) tall dam withholds a reservoir with a capacity of 545,000,000 m^{3} (441,839 acre⋅ft).

== See also ==
- List of dams and reservoirs in China
- List of major power stations in Guizhou
