= Muli River =

Coordinates: 27°49′47″N 101°11′12″E

Muli

Location
- Country: China
- Region: Sichuan

Physical characteristics
- Mouth
  - location: Yalong River
- Length: 388 km (241 mi)
- Discharge
  - average: 142 m^{3}/s (5,000 cu ft/s)

The Muli is a river in Sichuan Province, China. It is the principal tributary of the Yalong River. Six dams are planned for the river, three of which, Kajiwa, Lizhou and Shangtongba are under construction. Dashawan Dam on the middle reaches of the river was completed in 2012.
