= Dahuashui Dam =

- Location within China
- Country: China
- Location: Kaiyang County of Guizhou Province
- Coordinates: 26°49′26″N 107°15′54″E
- Construction began: December 2003
- Opening date: 2008

Dam and spillways
- Impounds: Qingshui River
- Height: 134.5 m (441 ft)
- Length: 287.6 m (944 ft)
- Width (base): 28 m (92 ft)

Reservoir
- Creates: Dahuashui Reservoir
- Total capacity: 276,500,000 m^{3} (224,162 acre⋅ft)
- Surface area: 7.6 km^{2} (3 sq mi)

Power Station
- Commission date: January 2008
- Hydraulic head: 127.7 m (419 ft) (min.)
- Installed capacity: 200 MW
- Annual generation: 775 GWh

The Dahuashui Dam is an arch dam on the Qingshuihe River near Pingzhai in Kaiyang County of Guizhou Province, China. The purpose of the dam is hydroelectric power production and flood control. The dam creates a reservoir of 276,500,000 m^{3} (224,162 acre⋅ft) which supplies water to a power station containing two 200 MW generators. Construction on the dam began in December 2003 and was expected to be complete in May 2007 but a lack of funding delayed project completion until initial operation on January 20, 2008. The dam was constructed with roller-compacted concrete.

== See also ==
- List of power stations in China
