= Qingshui River (Guizhou) =

Coordinates: 27°15′01″N 107°06′47″E

Qingshui

Location
- Country: China

Physical characteristics
- Mouth
  - location: Wu River

Qingshui River
- Chinese: 清水河
- Literal meaning: Clearwater River
Transcriptions
Standard Mandarin
- Hanyu Pinyin: Qīngshuǐhé
- Wade–Giles: Ch‘ing-shui-ho

The Qingshui River is a tributary of the Wu River in Guizhou Province, China. It is interrupted by the Dahuashui Dam.

== See also ==
- Other Qingshuis in China and on Taiwan
