= Lower Baoquan Dam =

Coordinates: 35°27′27.51″N 113°27′55.50″E

The Lower Baoquan Dam was completed in 1994 on the Yuhe River, a tributary of the Yalu River, and is a masonry gravity type. It was raised 16 metres (52 ft), from 91.1 metres (299 ft) to 107.5 metres (353 ft), to support the Baoquan Pumped Storage Power Station.
