= Jilintai I Dam =

Dam east of Nilka in Xinjiang, China

Jilintai Dam
- Location within China
- Country: China
- Location: Nilka
- Coordinates: 43°51′40″N 82°50′51″E
- Status: Operational
- Construction began: 2001
- Opening date: 2005

Dam and spillways
- Type of dam: Embankment, concrete-face rock-fill
- Impounds: Kash River
- Height: 157 m (515 ft)
- Length: 445 m (1,460 ft)
- Dam volume: 8,360,000 m^{3} (10,934,467 cu yd)
- Spillway type: Open hole tunnel
- Spillway capacity: 876 m^{3}/s (30,936 cu ft/s)

Reservoir
- Total capacity: 2,530,000,000 m^{3} (2,051,104 acre⋅ft)
- Active capacity: 1,700,000,000 m^{3} (1,378,212 acre⋅ft)

Power Station
- Turbines: 4 x 115 MW Francis-type
- Installed capacity: 460 MW

The Jilintai I Dam is a concrete-face rock-fill embankment dam on the Kash River, 29 km (18 mi) east of Nilka in Xinjiang, China. The dam was constructed between 2001 and 2005 for several purposes but mainly for hydroelectric power generation. It supports a 460 MW power station. The Jilintai I is the first of 10 dam projects on the Kash. Construction of Jilintai II, directly downstream, began in May 2008 and the 50 MW power station was commissioned in October 2010. The project, including the diversion dam, was completed in April 2011.

== See also ==
- List of major power stations in Xinjiang
