= Ludila Dam =

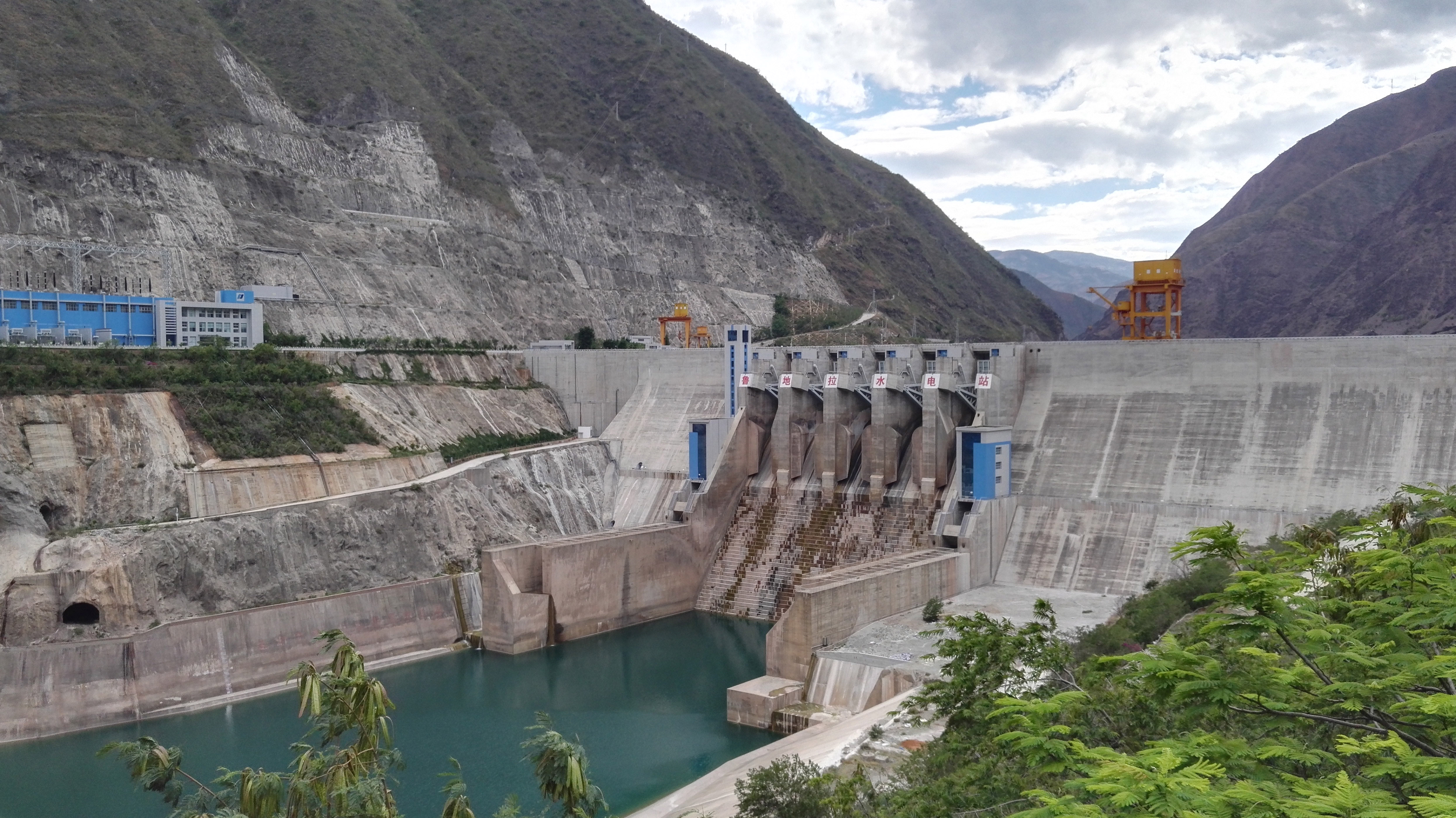
- The dam in June 2017

- Location within China
- Country: China
- Coordinates: 26°12′5.20″N 100°48′59.25″E
- Status: Operational
- Construction began: 2007
- Opening date: 2013
- Owner: Huadian Power

Dam and spillways
- Impounds: Jinsha River
- Height: 120 m (394 ft)

Reservoir
- Total capacity: 1,718,000,000 m^{3} (1,392,805 acre⋅ft)

Power Station
- Commission date: 2013-
- Turbines: 6 x 360 MW Francis-type
- Installed capacity: 2,160 MW

The Ludila Dam (鲁地拉水电站 in Chinese) is a gravity dam on the Jinsha River near Lijiang in Yunnan province, China. The primary purpose of the dam is hydroelectric power generation and it will support a 2,160 MW power station. Construction on the dam began in 2007 and was briefly halted in June 2009 by the Ministry of Environmental Protection after it was being constructed without approval. On 13 June 2013 the dam's first generator became operational. In May 2014 reports surfaced that the dam and been damaged or was structurally unsound, forcing engineers to draw down the reservoir level and leaving the power station inoperable. An estimated 16,900 people were relocated after its construction.

== See also ==
- List of power stations in China
