= Gongboxia Dam =

- Location within China
- Country: China
- Location: Longhua County, Qinghai Province
- Coordinates: 35°52′39″N 102°13′40″E
- Construction began: 2000
- Opening date: 2006

Dam and spillways
- Impounds: Yellow River
- Height: 132 m (433 ft)
- Length: 429 m (1,407 ft)
- Width (crest): 10 m (33 ft)
- Spillways: 2
- Spillway type: Service, controlled chute

Reservoir
- Creates: Gongboxia Reservoir
- Total capacity: 630,000,000 m^{3} (510,749 acre⋅ft)
- Catchment area: 143,619 km^{2} (55,452 sq mi)

Power Station
- Installed capacity: 1,500 MW
- Annual generation: 5.14 billion kWh

The Gongboxia Dam is a concrete face rock-fill embankment dam on the Yellow River in Longhua County, Qinghai Province, China. The dam supports a 1,500 MW hydroelectric power station.

Construction on the dam began in July 2000 by diverting the river and by August 15 the next year, the river was diverted and excavation began on the foundation. On August 1, 2002, workers began to create the embankment and by October the next year, the dam's body was almost complete. Concrete pouring on the face slab began in March 2004 and was complete by June. Filling of the reservoir began in August and in 2006 the project was complete.

== See also ==
- List of power stations in China
- List of dams and reservoirs in China
