= Baoquan Pumped Storage Power Station =

- Interactive map of Baoquan Pumped Storage Power Station
- Official name: 宝泉抽水蓄能电站
- Country: China
- Location: Jiaozuo
- Coordinates: 35°28′04″N 113°28′17″E
- Status: Operational
- Construction began: 2004
- Opening date: 2011
- Owner: State Grid Henan Baoquan Pumped Storage Co.

Upper reservoir
- Creates: Baoquan Upper Reservoir
- Total capacity: 8,270,000 m^{3} (6,705 acre⋅ft)

Lower reservoir
- Creates: Baoquan Reservoir
- Total capacity: 16,500,000 m^{3} (13,377 acre⋅ft)

Power Station
- Hydraulic head: 562.5 m (1,845 ft)
- Pump-generators: 4 x 300 MW (400,000 hp) Francis pump turbines
- Installed capacity: 1,200 MW (1,600,000 hp)
- Annual generation: 2,010 million kWh

The Baoquan Pumped Storage Power Station (Chinese: 宝泉抽水蓄能电站) is a pumped-storage hydroelectric power station located 34 kilometres (21 mi) northeast of Jiaozuo in Henan Province, China. It was constructed between June 2004 and December 2011 and has a 1,200-megawatt (1,600,000 hp) installed capacity. The power station operates by shifting water between an upper and lower reservoir to generate electricity.

== Upper Baoquan Reservoir ==
The Upper Baoquan Reservoir was formed by excavating a valley 1.5 kilometres (0.93 mi) above the lower reservoir and constructing a 94.8-metre (311 ft) tall concrete-face rock-fill dam. The walls around the reservoir are blanketed with concrete and asphalt. The upper reservoir has a 8,270,000 cubic metres (6,700 acre⋅ft) storage capacity of which 6,200,000 cubic metres (5,000 acre⋅ft) can be used for power generation.

== Baoquan Reservoir ==
The lower reservoir was formed by raising the height of the existing Lower Baoquan Dam while the Upper Baoquan Reservoir is located in a valley above the north side of the lower reservoir. During periods of low energy demand, such as at night, water is pumped from Baoquan Reservoir up to the upper reservoir. When energy demand is high, the water is released back down to the lower reservoir but the pump turbines that pumped the water up now reverse mode and serve as generators to produce electricity. The process is repeated as necessary and the plant serves as a peaking power plant.

The lower reservoir can store up to 16,500,000 cubic metres (13,400 acre⋅ft) of water. The drop in elevation between the upper and lower reservoir affords a hydraulic head of 562.5 metres (1,845 ft). While generating electricity, the pump-generators produce 2,010 million kWh annually but consumes 2,642 million kWh when pumping. Pumping when energy is low in demand and cheap helps cover the excess cost.

== See also ==
- List of pumped-storage power stations
