= Fu River (Sichuan) =

River in Sichuan and Chongqing, China

Coordinates: 29.9881°N 106.268°E

Fu River, or Fu Jiang (Chinese: 涪江; pinyin: Fú Jiāng) is a river of in China's Sichuan Province and Chongqing Municipality.It is a right tributary of the Jialing River, which in its turn is a left tributary of the Yangtze; it is thus part of the East China Sea basin.

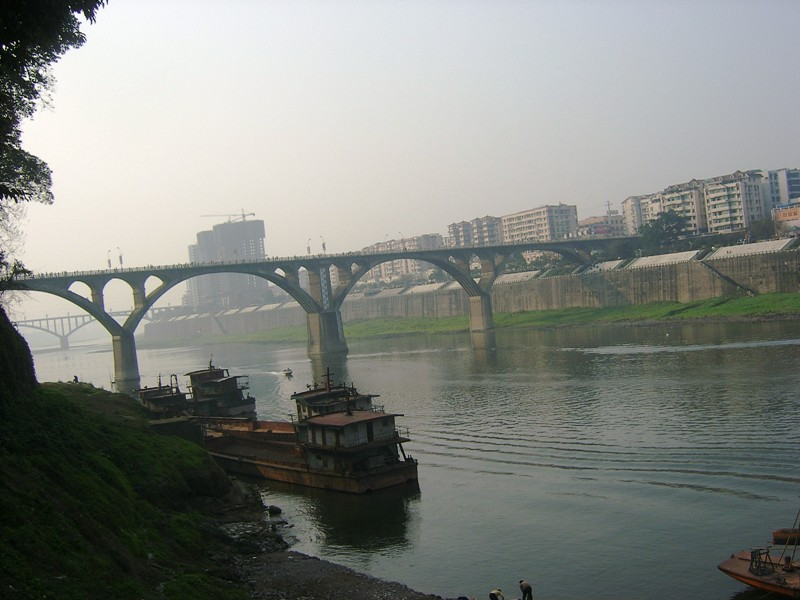
Two bridges across the Fu River at Hechuan, Chongqing.

The Fu River flows in the general southern and south-eastern direction across the central Sichuan (Mianyang and Suining Prefectures), and then enters the Chongqing Municipality, where it merges with the Jialing River.

== See also ==
- List of rivers in China
- List of rivers of India
