= Mianhuatan Dam =

- Location within China
- Country: China
- Location: Yongding County, Fujian Province
- Coordinates: 24°39′40″N 116°35′45″E
- Status: In use
- Construction began: 1998
- Opening date: June 2002

Dam and spillways
- Type of dam: Concrete gravity
- Impounds: Tingjiang River
- Height: 113 metres (371 ft)
- Length: 308.5 metres (1,012 ft)
- Width (crest): 7 metres (23 ft)
- Dam volume: 615,000 cubic metres (21,718,520 ft^{3})
- Spillway type: Service, gate-controlled on crest

Reservoir
- Creates: Mianhuatan Reservoir
- Total capacity: 1,698,000,000 cubic metres (1,376,591 acre⋅ft)
- Catchment area: 7,907 square kilometres (3,053 sq mi)
- Surface area: 64 square kilometres (25 sq mi)

Power Station
- Turbines: 4 x 150 MW Francis-type
- Installed capacity: 600 MW

The Mianhuatan Dam is a concrete gravity dam on the Tingjiang River in Yongding County, Fujian Province, China. The dam is 113 metres (371 ft) tall and composed of roller-compacted concrete. The main purpose of the dam is hydroelectric power generation and it supports a power station with 4 x 150 MW generators for a combined capacity of 600 MW. Other purposes of the dam include flood control, navigation and irrigation. Construction began in 1998 and the project was completed in June 2002.

== See also ==
- List of power stations in China
