= List of major power stations in Yunnan =

This article lists the major power stations located in Yunnan province.

== Non-renewable ==
=== Coal based ===
Station	Name in Chinese	Coordinates	Capacity (MW)	Operational units and (type)	Under construction units
Diandong Power Station	滇东电厂	25°11′59″N 104°40′57″E	2,400	4×600MW	
Xuanwei Power Station	宣威电厂	26°11′14″N 104°06′38″E	1,800	6×300MW	
Honghe Power Station	红河电厂	23°44′38″N 103°13′15″E	1,300	2×300MW, 1×700MW	
Qujing Power Station	曲靖电厂	25°39′48″N 104°03′52″E	1,200	4×300MW	
Yuwang Power Station	雨汪电厂	25°05′41″N 104°37′14″E	1,200	2×600MW	
Zhengxiong Power Station	镇雄电厂	27°29′34″N 104°56′52″E	1,200	2×600MW	
Weixing Power Station	威信电厂	27°53′03″N 104°52′46″E	1,200	2×600MW	
Yangzonghai Power Station	阳宗海电厂	24°57′41″N 103°01′44″E	1,000	2×200MW, 2×300MW	
Xiaolongtan Power Station	小龙潭发电厂	23°50′07″N 103°12′06″E	600	2×300MW	
Xunjiansi Power Station	巡检司电厂	23°57′25″N 103°11′21″E	600	2×300MW	
Kunming 2nd Power Station	昆明二电厂	25°00′53″N 102°19′58″E	600	2×300MW	

== Renewable ==
=== Hydroelectric ===
==== Conventional ====
Station	Name in Chinese	Coordinates	River	Capacity (MW)	Dam height (meters)	Status	Units
Xiangjiaba Hydro Power Station	向家坝水电站	28°38′41″N 104°23′32″E	Yangtze (Jinsha)	7,750	161	Operational	8×800MW, 3×450MW
Xiluodu Hydro Power Station	溪洛渡水电站	28°15′06″N 103°39′34″E	Yangtze (Jinsha)	13,860	278	Operational	18×770MW
Baihetan Hydro Power Station	白鹤滩水电站	27°13′22″N 102°54′10″E	Yangtze (Jinsha)	16,000	289	Operational, under construction	16×1,000MW
Wudongde Hydro Power Station	乌东德水电站	26°20′02″N 102°37′48″E	Yangtze (Jinsha)	10,200	270	Operational, under construction	12×850MW
Yinjiang Hydro Power Station	银江水电站	26°35′17″N 101°45′59″E	Yangtze (Jinsha)	390		Under construction	
Jinsha Hydro Power Station	金沙水电站	26°34′24″N 101°38′34″E	Yangtze (Jinsha)	560	66	Operational, under construction	
Guanyinyan Hydro Power Station	观音岩水电站	26°31′13″N 101°26′15″E	Yangtze (Jinsha)	3,000	159	Operational	5×600MW
Ludila Hydro Power Station	鲁地拉水电站	26°12′01″N 100°48′54″E	Yangtze (Jinsha)	2,160	140	Operational	6×360MW
Longkaikou Hydro Power Station	龙开口水电站	26°31′57″N 100°24′58″E	Yangtze (Jinsha)	1,800	119	Operational	5×360MW
Jin'anqiao Hydro Power Station	金安桥水电站	26°48′27″N 100°26′52″E	Yangtze (Jinsha)	2,400	160	Operational	4×600MW
Ahai Hydro Power Station	阿海水电站	27°19′59″N 100°30′27″E	Yangtze (Jinsha)	2,000	138	Operational	5×400MW
Liyuan Hydro Power Station	梨园水电站	27°39′36″N 100°17′12″E	Yangtze (Jinsha)	2,400	155	Operational	4×600MW
Xulong Hydro Power Station	旭龙水电站	28°45′42″N 99°6′59″E	Yangtze (Jinsha)	2,400		Under construction	4 x 600
Benzilan Hydro Power Station	奔子栏水电站		Yangtze (Jinsha)	2,100		In prep	4 x 555
Mengsong Hydro Power Station	勐松水电站	21°48′46″N 101°10′17″E	Lancang	600	65	In plan	
Jinghong Hydro Power Station	景洪水电站	22°03′06″N 100°46′01″E	Lancang	1,750	108	Operational	5×350MW
Nuozadu Hydro Power Station	糯扎渡水电站	22°38′17″N 100°25′56″E	Lancang	5,850	261.5	Operational	9×650MW
Dachaoshan Hydro Power Station	大朝山水电站	24°01′30″N 100°22′12″E	Lancang	1,350	111	Operational	6×225MW
Manwan Hydro Power Station	漫湾水电站	24°37′17″N 100°26′53″E	Lancang	1,500	132	Operational	5×300MW
Xiaowan Hydro Power Station	小湾水电站	24°42′19″N 100°05′32″E	Lancang	4,200	292	Operational	6×700MW
Gongguoqiao Hydro Power Station	功果桥水电站	25°35′09″N 99°20′09″E	Lancang	900	105	Operational	4×225MW
Miaowei Hydro Power Station	苗尾水电站	25°51′20″N 99°09′40″E	Lancang	1,400	139.8	Operational	4×350MW
Dahuaqiao Hydro Power Station	大华桥水电站	26°18′24″N 99°08′29″E	Lancang	900	106	Operational	4×225MW
Huangdeng Hydro Power Station	黄登水电站	26°33′35″N 99°07′11″E	Lancang	1,900	203	Operational	4×475MW
Tuoba Hydro Power Station	托巴水电站	27°10′52″N 99°08′55″E	Lancang	1,400	158	Operational	4×350MW
Lidi Hydro Power Station	里底水电站	27°50′24″N 99°02′01″E	Lancang	420	74	Operational	3×127MW
Wunonglong Hydro Power Station	乌弄龙水电站	27°57′00″N 99°54′55″E	Lancang	990	137.5	Operational	3×330MW
Gushui Hydro Power Station	古水水电站	28°36′19″N 98°45′26″E	Lancang	1,800	310	In plan	
Ganlanba Hydro Power Station	橄榄坝水电站	27°57′00″N 99°54′55″E	Lancang	155	60.5	In plan	5×31MW
Sinanjiang Hydro Power Station	泗南江水电站	23°05′38″N 101°52′25″E	Sinan	201	115	Operational	3×67MW
Madushan Hydro Power Station	马堵山水电站	23°02′46″N 103°17′05″E	Red	300	105.5	Operational	3×100MW
Malutang Hydro Power Station	马鹿塘水电站	23°01′03″N 104°44′39″E	Panlong	240	154	Operational	3×80MW
Lubuge Hydro Power Station	鲁布革水电站	24°51′58″N 104°34′48″E	Beipan River	600	103.8	Operational	4×150MW
Longjiang Hydro Power Station	龙江水电站	24°14′23″N 98°06′41″E	Long River	240	110	Operational	
Gelantan Hydro Power Station	戈兰滩水电站	22°42′08″N 102°03′27″E	Lixian River	390	113	Operational	2×120MW; 1×150MW
Longma Hydro Power Station	龙马水电站	22°52′31″N 101°38′50″E	Lixian River	240	135	Operational	3×80MW
Shimenkan Hydro Power Station	石门坎水电站	23°01′18″N 101°29′55″E	Lixian River	130	111	Operational	2×65MW
Yayangshan Hydro Power Station	崖羊山水电站	23°06′05″N 101°23′41″E	Lixian River	120	88	Operational	2×60MW
Tukahe Hydro Power Station	土卡河水电站	22°33′31″N 102°18′38″E	Lixian River	165	59.2	Operational	3×55MW
Jufudu Hydro Power Station	居甫渡水电站	22°54′11″N 101°46′23″E	Lixian River	295	95	Operational	3×95MW

==== Pumped-storage ====
Station	Name in Chinese	Coordinates	Capacity (MW)	Rated head (meters)	Status	Generator units	Under construction units
Lufeng Pumped Storage Power Station	禄丰抽水蓄能电站		1,200	435	UC		4×300MW

== See also ==
- List of power stations in China
