= Xiaonanhai Dam =

- Location within China
- Country: People's Republic of China
- Coordinates: 29°03′36.30″N 105°56′32.31″E
- Status: Cancelled
- Construction began: March 2012 (preliminary)
- Opening date: 2019 est.
- Construction cost: RMB¥32 billion

Dam and spillways
- Impounds: Yangtze River
- Height: 67 m (220 ft)

Reservoir
- Creates: Xiaonanhai Reservoir
- Total capacity: 1,300×10^{6} m^{3} (1,053,927 acre⋅ft)
- Inactive capacity: 655×10^{6} m^{3} (531,017 acre⋅ft)

Power Station
- Installed capacity: 1,760 MW

The Xiaonanhai Dam was a proposed dam on the Yangtze River in Chongqing, China. It was to have an associated 1,760 MW hydroelectric power station. Preliminary construction on the dam began on 29 March 2012 and earliest completion was expected in 2019. However, it was cancelled in March 2015 due to environmental concerns.

== Project initiation ==
The project, under responsibility of the Chongqing municipal government, was initiated under the stewardship of Bo Xilai prior to his fall from grace in 2012. The dam was to be constructed by China Three Gorges Corporation 40 km upstream of the city, and 700 km upstream from the Three Gorges Dam.

Weng Lida, a former director of the water resources bureau at the Yangtze River Commission, said that senior China Three Gorges executives had succumbed to pressure from the Chongqing authorities. According to the South China Morning Post, Chongqing's success in overcoming all major obstacles to the dam's construction is attributed to the personal intervention of Bo.

== Controversy ==
The project was strongly opposed by environmentalists, who saw it as a "politically motivated decision". It was highly controversial due to the environmental impact, the high cost-benefit ratio, as well as the secretive decision-making process under Bo. A total of 338 freshwater fish species have been identified on the Yangtze. 189 live in the area – currently a preservation – and many of those are found in no other river basin in China.

An official study by the Yangtze River Commission in 2003 concluded that the Xiaonanhai dam could not be recommended due to its "unremarkable economic returns". According to Chongqing Daily, project cost per-kilowatt is triple that compared with other projects along the Yangtze: with total investment estimated at ¥32 billion, the project will cost ¥16,000 per-kilowatt of capacity, whereas the Three Gorges dam, Xiluodu Dam and Xiangjiaba cost ¥4,950, ¥3,538 and ¥5,749 respectively. Under pressure from environmental critics the central government in 2009.

On 14 December 2011 the State Council approved changes to shrink the boundaries of a Yangtze River preserve, clearing the way for the construction of the dam and the flooding of much of the preserve. Environmentalists also feared that the dam will seriously affect biodiversity and render extinct several endangered fish species, including the Chinese sturgeon and Chinese paddlefish. Critics were most bitter about the perceived silencing of leading mainland scientists who were previously allied with environmentalists in opposing the Xiaonanhai dam and the downsizing of a neighboring national fishery reserve to make way for the project.

A 30 March 2015 order given by the Ministry of Environmental Protection to cancel the dam surfaced in early April 2015. The order may be due to the project's encroachment on protected areas.

== See also ==
- List of dams and reservoirs in China
- List of power stations in China
