= List of conventional hydroelectric power stations =

This is a list of conventional hydroelectric power stations.

This list includes power stations that are larger than 1,000 megawatts (1.3×10^{6} hp) in maximum net capacity, and are operational or under construction. Those power stations that are smaller than 1,000 MW, or those that are only at a planning/proposal stage may be found in regional lists, listed at the end of the page.

== Overview ==
The largest hydroelectric power station is the Three Gorges Dam in China, rated at 22.5 gigawatts (30.2×10^{6} hp) in total installed capacity. After passing on 7 December 2007 the 14-gigawatt (19×10^{6} hp) mark of the Itaipu Dam, the facility was ranked as the largest power-generating facility ever built. The dam is 181 metres (594 ft) high, 2,335 metres (7,661 ft) long and 115 metres (377 ft) in width. Power is generated by 32 turbines rated at 700 MW (940,000 hp), and two turbines rated 50 MW (67,000 hp), which are used to power the facility itself. Construction of this dam commenced in 1994, and was completed in 2012, nearly two decades after it started.

The next six largest dams, after the Three Gorges Dam, with capacity of more than 10 gigawatts (13×10^{6} hp) are:

1. Baihetan Dam – 16 gigawatts (21×10^{6} hp)
2. Itaipu Dam – 14 gigawatts (19×10^{6} hp)
3. Xiluodu Dam – 13.86 gigawatts (18.59×10^{6} hp)
4. Belo Monte Dam – 11.233 gigawatts (15.064×10^{6} hp)
5. Guri Dam – 10.235 gigawatts (13.725×10^{6} hp)
6. Wudongde Dam – 10.2 gigawatts (13.7×10^{6} hp)

The planned Grand Inga Dam, if completed, with capacity of 40 to 70 gigawatts (54×10^{6} to 94×10^{6} hp), is estimated to be nearly twice the size of the Three Gorges Dam.

The Three Gorges Dam in Hubei, China, has the world's largest instantaneous generating capacity at 22,500 MW of power. In second place is the Baihetan Dam, also in China, with a capacity of 16,000 MW. The Itaipu Dam in Paraguay and Brazil is the third largest with 14,000 MW of power. Despite the large difference in installed capacity between Three Gorges Dam and Itaipu Dam, they generate nearly equal amounts of electrical energy during the course of an entire year – Itaipu 103 terawatt-hours (370 PJ) in 2016 and Three Gorges 111.8 TWh (402 PJ) in 2020, because the Three Gorges experiences six months per year when there is very little water available to generate power, while the Paraná River continuously feeds the Itaipu with an ample supply of water year-round.

Energy output of the Three Gorges reaches 125 TWh (450 PJ) in years of high feed availability. The Three Gorges (22,500 MW - 32 × 700 MW and 2 × 50 MW) is operated jointly with the much smaller Gezhouba Dam (2,715 MW). The total generating capacity of this two-dam complex is 25,215 MW. The Itaipu on the Brazil–Paraguay border has 20 generator units with overall 14,000 MW of installed capacity. However, the maximum number of generating units allowed to operate simultaneously cannot exceed 18 (12,600 MW).

The Jinsha River (the upper stream of Yangtze River) complex is the largest hydroelectric generating system currently under construction. It has three phases. Phase one includes four dams on the downstream of the Jinsha River. They are Wudongde Dam, Baihetan Dam, Xiluodu Dam, and Xiangjiaba Dam, with generating capacity of 10,200 MW, 16,000 MW, 13,860 MW, and 7,798 MW respectively. Phase two includes eight dams on the middle stream of the Jinsha River. The total generating capacity is 21,150 MW. Phase three includes eight dams on the upper stream of the Jinsha River. The total generating capacity is 8,980 MW. The total combined capacity of the Jinsha complex with the Three Gorges complex will be 103,203 MW.

As of 2025, plans exist in the Democratic Republic of the Congo for the construction of a hydroelectric power station set to overtake the Three Gorges, with an installed capacity of 39,000 MW. The Project is called Grand Inga and is planned to be realised on the lower Congo River. As of 2014, China is working on a 50,000 MW dam as part of the Yarlung Tsangpo Hydroelectric and Water Diversion Project. Another proposal, Penzhin Tidal Power Plant, presumes an installed capacity up to 87,100 MW.

The largest hydroelectric power stations top the list of the largest power stations of any kind, are among the largest hydraulic structures and are some of the largest artificial structures in the world.

== Hydroelectric power stations ==
The following two lists rank the largest conventional hydroelectric power stations that have an installed electric power generation capacity of at least 1,000 MW.

Station	Image	Country	Location	River	Installed capacity	Annual production (Note: Generating capacity is not the only factor determining the amount of electricity generated, as this also depends on consistent utilization of the plant's capacity. Factors enhancing this are the free capacity of the reservoir and the consistency of water supply during and across years.)	Area flooded	Reservoir volume	Years of completion	Ref
Adam Beck Hydroelectric Generating Stations		Canada	43°08′51″N 79°02′42″W		1,962 megawatts (2,631,000 hp)					
Ahai Dam		China	27°19′59″N 100°30′27″E		2,000 megawatts (2,700,000 hp)					
Akosombo Dam	Aerial view of a large rock structure located in a forest between the mountains, large pipes and a cloudy sky	Ghana	06°17′59″N 00°03′34″E		1,020 megawatts (1,370,000 hp)					
Alberto Lleras Dam		Colombia	04°43′29″N 73°28′59″W		1,150 megawatts (1,540,000 hp)					
Aldeadávila Dam		Portugal; Spain	41°12′42″N 6°41′08″W		1,139.2 megawatts (1,527,700 hp)					
Alicurá Dam		Argentina	40°35′10″S 70°45′09″W		1,050 megawatts (1,410,000 hp)					
Aswan High Dam	Image of Aswan High Dam, looking east, with powerhouse in background	Egypt	23°58′14″N 32°52′40″E		2,100 megawatts (2,800,000 hp)					
Atatürk Dam	Aerial view of a large structure located between mountains and a large lake	Turkey	37°28′54″N 38°19′03″E		2,400 megawatts (3,200,000 hp)					
Baihetan Dam		China	28°15′06″N 103°39′34″E	Jinsha	16,000 megawatts (21,000,000 hp)	60.24 TWh (216.9 PJ)		20.62 km^{3}	2022	
Baishan Dam		China	42°43′35″N 127°13′25″E		1,800 megawatts (2,400,000 hp)					
Bakun Hydroelectric Power Station	Image of a large rock structure and a power transformation station in the left, a rocky mountain, a river and another concrete structure in the right	Malaysia	02°45′23″N 114°03′47″E		2,520 megawatts (3,380,000 hp)					
Bath County PSP		United States	38°12′32″N 79°48′00″W		3,003 MW	3.32 TWh (12.0 PJ)	3.3 km^{2}	0.030 km^{3}	1985, 2005/2009	
Beauharnois Hydroelectric Power Station		Canada	45°18′50″N 73°54′32″W		1,903 megawatts (2,552,000 hp)					
Belo Monte Dam		Brazil	3°7′40″S 51°46′33″W	Xingu	11,223 megawatts (15,050,000 hp); 11,233 MW	39.5 TWh (142 PJ)	441 km^{2}	1.89 km^{3}	2016/2019	
Bento Munhoz Hydroelectric Plant		Brazil	26°00′34″S 51°40′00″W		1,674 megawatts (2,245,000 hp)					
Bersimis-1 generating station		Canada	49°18′31″N 69°33′50″W		1,178 megawatts (1,580,000 hp)					
Bhakra Dam	Image of a large structure located between two mountains with power lines, a jungle, a house and a green river	India	31°24′39″N 76°26′00″E		1,325 megawatts (1,777,000 hp)					
Bieudron Hydroelectric Power Station		Switzerland	46°11′7″N 7°14′58″E		1,269 megawatts (1,702,000 hp)					
Boguchany Hydroelectric Power Station		Russia	58°41′41″N 99°08′56″E		2,997 megawatts (4,019,000 hp)					
Bonneville Dam		United States	45°38′39″N 121°56′26″W		1,242 megawatts (1,666,000 hp)					
Boundary Dam		United States	48°59′14″N 117°20′51″W		1,003.25 megawatts (1,345,380 hp)					
Bratsk Dam	Image of a large concrete structure that looks kind of old and unused with a pier and some structures on it and alongside it	Russia	56°17′10″N 101°47′10″E	Angara	4,500 megawatts (6,000,000 hp); 4,515 MW	22.6 TWh (81 PJ)	5,470 km^{2}	169.27 km^{3}	1961/1966	
Bureya Dam		Russia	50°16′07″N 130°18′54″E		2,010 megawatts (2,700,000 hp)					
Cahora Bassa Dam		Mozambique	15°35′07″S 32°42′17″E		2,075 megawatts (2,783,000 hp)					
Caruachi Dam	Image of a wall like structure in left, a raging river in the right and power lines located on low hills	Venezuela	08°09′36″N 62°47′55″W		2,160 megawatts (2,900,000 hp)					
Cheboksary Hydroelectric Station		Russia	56°08′17″N 47°27′56″E		1,374 megawatts (1,843,000 hp)					
Chicoasén Dam		Mexico	16°56′30″N 93°06′02″W		2,430 megawatts (3,260,000 hp)					
Chief Joseph Dam		United States	47°59′43″N 119°38′00″W		2,620 megawatts (3,510,000 hp)					
Chirkey Dam		Russia	42°58′38″N 46°52′15″E		1,000 megawatts (1,300,000 hp)					
Chivor Hydroelectric Project		Colombia	04°54′03″N 73°17′49″W		1,000 megawatts (1,300,000 hp)					
Churchill Falls		Canada	53°31′46″N 63°58′05″W	Churchill	5,428 megawatts (7,279,000 hp)	35 TWh (130 PJ)	6,988 km^{2}	32.64 km^{3}	1971/1974	
Cirata Dam		Indonesia	6°42′02″S 107°22′01″E		1,008 megawatts (1,352,000 hp)					
Coca Codo Sinclair		Ecuador	00°07′52″S 77°27′07″W		1,500 megawatts (2,000,000 hp)					
Dachaoshan Dam		China	24°01′38″N 100°22′19″E		1,350 megawatts (1,810,000 hp)					
Dagangshan Dam		China	29°26′57″N 102°13′02″E		2,600 megawatts (3,500,000 hp)					
Dalles Dam		United States	45°36′44″N 121°08′04″W		1,878 megawatts (2,518,000 hp)					
Danjiangkou Dam		China	32°33′21″N 111°29′16″E		1,035 megawatts (1,388,000 hp)					
Dnieper Hydroelectric Station		Ukraine	47°52′09″N 35°05′13″E		1,578.6 megawatts (2,116,900 hp)					
El Chocón Dam		Argentina	39°15′57″S 68°45′23″W		1,260 megawatts (1,690,000 hp)					
Emborcação Hydroelectric Power Plant		Brazil	18°34′33″S 47°52′37″W		1,192 megawatts (1,598,000 hp)					
Engineer Souza Dias Hydroelectric Power Station		Brazil	26°27′00″S 52°40′00″W		1,551 megawatts (2,080,000 hp)					
Enguri Dam		Georgia	42°45′36″N 42°01′48″E		1,300 megawatts (1,700,000 hp)					
Ertan Dam		China	26°49′16″N 101°46′52″E	Yalong	3,300 megawatts (4,400,000 hp)	17 TWh (61 PJ)	101 km^{2}	5.8 km^{3}	1999	
Estreito Hydroelectric Power Plant^{(Portuguese)}		Brazil	06°35′22″S 47°27′53″W		1,087 megawatts (1,458,000 hp)					
Fengman Dam		China	43°43′10″N 126°41′18″E		1,480 megawatts (1,980,000 hp)					
Fengning PSP Station		China	41°41′03″N 116°33′12″E		3,600 MW	3.4 TWh (12 PJ)		0.070 km^{3}	2019/2021	
Furnas Dam		Brazil	20°40′11″S 46°19′05″W		1,240 megawatts (1,660,000 hp)					
Geheyan Dam		China	30°28′3″N 111°8′23″E		1,200 megawatts (1,600,000 hp)					
Gezhouba Dam		China	30°44′23″N 111°16′20″E		2,715 megawatts (3,641,000 hp)					
Ghazi-Barotha Hydropower Project		Pakistan	33°46′48″N 72°15′35″E		1,450 megawatts (1,940,000 hp)					
Gilgel Gibe III Dam		Ethiopia	06°50′50″N 37°18′05″E		1,870 megawatts (2,510,000 hp)					
Glen Canyon Dam		United States	36°56′14″N 111°29′04″W		1,320 megawatts (1,770,000 hp)					
Gongboxia Dam		China	35°52′40″N 102°13′56″E		1,500 megawatts (2,000,000 hp)					
Gordon M. Shrum Generating Station		Canada	56°01′05″N 122°12′24″W		2,907 megawatts (3,898,000 hp)					
Goupitan Dam		China	27°22′31″N 107°37′59″E	Wu	3,000 megawatts (4,000,000 hp)	9.67 TWh (34.8 PJ)	94 km^{2}	6.45 km^{3}	2009/2011	
Grand Coulee Dam	Image of some mountains, a large structure, a river and a village near the river	United States	47°57′24″N 118°59′00″W	Columbia	6,809 megawatts (9,131,000 hp)	20.24 TWh (72.9 PJ)	324 km^{2}	12 km^{3}	1942/1950, 1973, 1975/1980, 1983/1984, 1991 (Note: First unit installed in 1942, 18th in 1950, 21st in 1991; 6 units in third powerplant were installed between 1975 and 1980, 2 units of pumped-storage plant were installed in 1973, 4 more units in 1983 and 1984.)	
Grand Ethiopian Renaissance		Ethiopia	11°12′51″N 35°05′35″E	Blue Nile	5,150 (Note: 750 MW commissioned as of August 2022)		1,800 km^{2}	74 km^{3}	2022-2025	
Grand'Maison Dam		France	45°12′21″N 06°07′01″E		1,800 megawatts (2,400,000 hp)					
Guandi Dam		China	27°44′39″N 101°55′47″E		2,400 megawatts (3,200,000 hp)					
Guangzhao Dam		China	25°57′34″N 105°15′03″E		1,040 megawatts (1,390,000 hp)					
Guanyinyan Dam		China	26°31′17″N 101°26′16″E	Jinsha	3,000 megawatts (4,000,000 hp)	13.62 TWh (49.0 PJ)		2.07 km^{3}	2014/2016	
Guri Dam	Ground-level view of a large concrete structure in the left, power lines at the top and a parking lot with many cars in it	Venezuela	07°46′00″N 63°00′00″W	Caroní	10,235 megawatts (13,725,000 hp)	53.41 TWh (192.3 PJ)	4,250 km^{2}	135 km^{3}	1978, 1986	
Hoover Dam	Aerial view of a white structure located between mountains with a lake, roads in the left, power lines in the right and a pylon with some wires in the low part	United States	36°00′56″N 114°44′16″W		2,080 megawatts (2,790,000 hp)					
Houziyan Dam		China	30°32′46″N 102°03′29″E		1,700 megawatts (2,300,000 hp)					
Huangdeng Dam		China	26°33′22″N 99°06′41″E		1,900 megawatts (2,500,000 hp)					
Hòa Bình Dam		Vietnam	20°48′30″N 105°19′26″E		1,960 megawatts (2,630,000 hp)					
Ilha Solteira Dam		Brazil	20°22′58″S 51°21′44″W	Paraná	3,444 megawatts (4,618,000 hp)	17.9 TWh (64 PJ)	1,195 km^{2}	21.2 km^{3}	1973	
Ilisu Dam		Turkey	37°34′00″N 41°54′00″E		1,200 megawatts (1,600,000 hp)					
Indirasagar Dam		India	22°17′02″N 76°28′17″E		10,000 megawatts (13,000,000 hp)					
Infiernillo Dam		Mexico	18°16′23″N 101°53′34″W		1,120 megawatts (1,500,000 hp)					
Inga II		Democratic Republic of the Congo	05°31′44″S 13°37′14″E		1,424 megawatts (1,910,000 hp)					
Iron Gate I Hydroelectric Power Station		Romania; Serbia	44°40′15″N 22°31′45″E		2,372 megawatts (3,181,000 hp)					
Itaipu Dam	Aerial view of a huge concrete structure located between some low hills and a river, with some large pipes at the base and power lines at the top of the structure and a road	Brazil; Paraguay	25°24′31″S 54°35′21″W	Paraná	14,000 megawatts (19,000,000 hp)	103 TWh (370 PJ)	1,350 km^{2}	29 km^{3}	1984/1991, 2003 (Note: First unit installed in 1984, 18th in 1991; in 2003, 2 additional units were installed.)	
Itumbiara Hydroelectric Power Plant		Brazil	18°25′00″S 49°13′00″W		2,082 megawatts (2,792,000 hp)					
Itá Hydroelectric Power Plant		Brazil	27°16′00″S 52°19′00″W		1,450 megawatts (1,940,000 hp)					
Jean-Lesage generating station		Canada	49°19′18″N 68°20′49″W		1,145 megawatts (1,535,000 hp)					
Jinanqiao Dam		China	26°48′27″N 100°26′52″E		2,400 megawatts (3,200,000 hp)					
Jinghong Dam		China	22°3′9″N 100°45′54″E		1,750 megawatts (2,350,000 hp)					
Jinping-I Dam		China	28°11′07″N 101°37′42″E	Yalong	3,600 megawatts (4,800,000 hp)	17 TWh (61 PJ)	82.5 km^{2}	7.76 km^{3}	2014	
Jinping-II Dam		China	28°14′20″N 101°38′32″E	Yalong	4,800 megawatts (6,400,000 hp)	24.23 TWh (87.2 PJ)		0.010 km^{3}	2014	
Jirau Power Station		Brazil	9°15′0″S 64°24′0″W	Madeira	3,750 megawatts (5,030,000 hp)	19.1 TWh (69 PJ)	258 km^{2}		2014/2016	
Jishixia Dam		China	35°49′42″N 102°42′23″E		1,020 megawatts (1,370,000 hp)					
John Day Dam		United States	45°42′59″N 120°41′40″W		2,160 megawatts (2,900,000 hp)					
José Richa Hydroelectric Plant		Brazil	25°32′36″S 53°29′48″W		1,240 megawatts (1,660,000 hp)					
Julius Nyerere Dam		Tanzania	07°48′19″S 37°50′44″E		2,115 megawatts (2,836,000 hp)					
Karakaya Dam		Turkey	38°13′40″N 39°08′20″E		1,800 megawatts (2,400,000 hp)					
Karcham Wangtoo Hydroelectric Plant		India	31°32′35.53″N 78°00′54.80″E		1,000 megawatts (1,300,000 hp)					
Kariba Power Station		Zambia; Zimbabwe	16°31′18″S 28°45′41″E		1,626 megawatts (2,181,000 hp)					
Karun-1 Dam (Shahid Abbaspour)		Iran	32°07′00″N 49°37′00″E		2,000 megawatts (2,700,000 hp)					
Karun-2 Dam (Masjed Soleyman)		Iran	32°01′40″N 49°24′01″E		2,000 megawatts (2,700,000 hp)					
Karun-3 Dam		Iran	31°48′00″N 50°05′00″E		2,280 megawatts (3,060,000 hp)					
Karun-4 Dam		Iran	31°36′00″N 50°28′00″E		1,020 megawatts (1,370,000 hp)					
Keban Dam	Aerial view of a concrete structure located between mountains that has a long ridge, a road and large pipes and an electric power transformation station	Turkey	38°48′25″N 38°45′25″E		1,330 megawatts (1,780,000 hp)					
Kettle Generating Station		Canada	56°23′03″N 94°38′06″W		1,220 megawatts (1,640,000 hp)					
Koyna Hydroelectric Project		India	17°24′06″N 73°45′08″E		1,960 megawatts (2,630,000 hp)					
Krasnoyarsk Dam	Image of a large water retaining structure that spills water like a waterfall, some power lines and a construction crane	Russia	55°56′05″N 92°17′40″E	Yenisei	6,000 megawatts (8,000,000 hp)	18.35 TWh (66.1 PJ)	2,000 km^{2}	73.3 km^{3}	1967/1972	
Kvilldal Hydroelectric Power Station		Norway	59°31′00″N 06°38′00″E		1,240 megawatts (1,660,000 hp)					
La Grande-1 generating station		Canada	53°44′04″N 78°34′25″W		1,436 megawatts (1,926,000 hp)					
La Grande-2-A generating station		Canada	53°47′09″N 77°27′07″W		2,106 megawatts (2,824,000 hp)					
La Grande-3 generating station		Canada	53°43′40″N 75°59′55″W		2,418 megawatts (3,243,000 hp)					
La Grande-4 generating station		Canada	53°53′12″N 73°27′55″W		2,779 megawatts (3,727,000 hp)					
Lai Châu Dam		Vietnam	22°08′22″N 102°59′07″E		1,200 megawatts (1,600,000 hp)					
Laxiwa Dam		China	36°04′13″N 101°11′08″E	Yellow	4,200 megawatts (5,600,000 hp)	10.23 TWh (36.8 PJ)		1.08 km^{3}	2010	
Laúca Dam		Angola	9°44′34.9″S 15°07′32.2″E		2,070 megawatts (2,780,000 hp)					
Lianghekou Dam		China	30°09′46″N 101°00′49″E	Yalong	3,000 megawatts (4,000,000 hp)	11 TWh (40 PJ)		10.77 km^{3}	2021/2022	
Lijiaxia Dam		China	36°7′7″N 101°48′29″E		2,000 megawatts (2,700,000 hp)					
Limestone Generating Station		Canada	55°30′25″N 94°06′25″W		1,340 megawatts (1,800,000 hp)					
Liujiaxia Dam		China	35°56′02″N 103°20′34″E		1,225 megawatts (1,643,000 hp)					
Liyuan Dam		China	27°39′36″N 100°17′12″E		2,400 megawatts (3,200,000 hp)					
Longkaikou Dam		China	26°31′57″N 100°24′58″E		1,800 megawatts (2,400,000 hp)					
Long Spruce Generating Station		Canada	56°24′1″N 94°22′10″W		1,010 megawatts (1,350,000 hp)					
Longtan Dam		China	25°01′38″N 107°02′51″E	Hongshui	6,426 megawatts (8,617,000 hp)	18.7 TWh (67 PJ)		27.27 km^{3}	2007/2009	
Longyangxia Dam		China	36°7′21″N 100°55′12″E		1,280 megawatts (1,720,000 hp)					
Ludila Dam		China	26°12′01″N 100°48′54″E		2,160 megawatts (2,900,000 hp)					
Luiz Barreto Hydroelectric Power Plant		Brazil	20°9′11″S 47°16′46″W		1,050 megawatts (1,410,000 hp)					
Luiz Gonzaga Power Station		Brazil	9°8′38″S 38°18′48″W		1,479 megawatts (1,983,000 hp)					
Macagua		Venezuela	8°18′14″N 62°40′04″W	Caroní	3,167.5 megawatts (4,247,700 hp)	15.2 TWh (55 PJ)	47.4 km^{2}	0.36 km^{3}	1961, 1996	
Machadinho Hydroelectric Power Plant		Brazil	27°34′00″S 51°40′00″W		1,140 megawatts (1,530,000 hp)					
Maerdang Dam		China	34°40′21″N 100°41′32″E		2,200 megawatts (3,000,000 hp)					
Malpaso (Nezahualcoyotl) Dam		Mexico	17°10′43″N 93°35′54″W		1,080 megawatts (1,450,000 hp)					
Mangla Dam		Pakistan	33°08′31″N 73°38′42″E		1,070 megawatts (1,430,000 hp)					
Manic-5 Generating Station		Canada	50°38′21″N 68°43′35″W		1,596 megawatts (2,140,000 hp)					
Manic-5-PA Generating Station		Canada	50°28′30″N 68°43′46″W		1,064 megawatts (1,427,000 hp)					
Mantaro-Tablachaca Hydroelectric Complex^{(Spanish)}		Peru	12°17′28″S 74°41′04″W		1,008 megawatts (1,352,000 hp)					
Manwan Dam		China	24°37′20″N 100°26′56″E		1,570 megawatts (2,110,000 hp)					
Marimbondo Hydroelectric Power Plant		Brazil	20°18′14″S 49°11′52″W		1,440 megawatts (1,930,000 hp)					
McNary Dam		United States	45°55′47″N 119°17′46″W		1,127 megawatts (1,511,000 hp)					
Merowe Dam		Sudan	18°40′08″N 32°03′01″E		1,250 megawatts (1,680,000 hp)					
Miaowei Dam		China	25°51′15.66″N 99°9′40.78″E		1,400 megawatts (1,900,000 hp)					
Mica Dam		Canada	52°04′40″N 118°33′59″W		2,805 megawatts (3,762,000 hp)					
Moses-Saunders Power Dam		Canada; United States	45°00′23″N 74°47′42″W		1,957 megawatts (2,624,000 hp)					
Mosul Dam		Iraq	36°37′49″N 42°49′23″E		1,052 megawatts (1,411,000 hp)					
Nam Theun II Dam		Laos	17°30′14″N 105°01′53″E		1,075 megawatts (1,442,000 hp)					
Nathpa Jhakri Dam		India	31°33′50″N 77°58′49″E		1,500 megawatts (2,000,000 hp)					
Ney Braga Hydroelectric Plant		Brazil	25°47′35″S 52°6′47″W		1,280 megawatts (1,720,000 hp)					
Nizhnekamsk Hydroelectric Station		Russia	55°41′59″N 52°16′43″E		1,205 megawatts (1,616,000 hp)					
Nuozhadu Dam		China	22°33′51″N 100°30′46″E	Mekong	5,850 megawatts (7,840,000 hp)	23.9 TWh (86 PJ)	320 km^{2}	21.75 km^{3}	2014	
Nurek Dam		Tajikistan	38°22′00″N 69°21′00″E	Vakhsh	3,015 megawatts (4,043,000 hp)	11.2 TWh (40 PJ)	98 km^{2}	10.5 km^{3}	1972/1979, 1988	
Outardes-3 generating station		Canada	49°33′33″N 68°43′58″W		1,026 megawatts (1,376,000 hp)					
Paulo Afonso Hydroelectric Complex	Aerial image of a coastal mountainous place with some structures located on top of it and some power lines	Brazil	9°23′49″S 38°12′08″W	São Francisco	4,279 megawatts (5,738,000 hp); 4,279.6 MW		117 km^{2}	1.4 km^{3}	1954/1974, 1979/1983	
Paute Dam		Ecuador	02°35′10″S 78°33′30″W		1,075 megawatts (1,442,000 hp)					
Pengshui Dam		China	29°12′02″N 108°11′50″E		1,750 megawatts (2,350,000 hp)					
Piedra del Águila Dam		Argentina	40°11′25″S 69°59′29″W		1,400 megawatts (1,900,000 hp)					
Porto Primavera Dam		Brazil	15°34′45″S 56°05′49″W		1,540 megawatts (2,070,000 hp)					
Pubugou Dam		China	29°12′34″N 102°50′11″E	Dadu	3,300 megawatts (4,400,000 hp)	14.6 TWh (53 PJ)		5.39 km^{3}	2009/2010	
René-Lévesque generating station		Canada	49°44′25″N 68°35′34″W		1,244 megawatts (1,668,000 hp)					
Revelstoke Dam		Canada	51°02′58″N 118°11′38″W		2,480 megawatts (3,330,000 hp)					
Robert-Bourassa generating station	A giant staircase carved in the rock	Canada	53°47′43″N 77°26′26″W	La Grande	5,616 megawatts (7,531,000 hp) (Note: Combined with adjacent La Grande-2-A the LG-2 complex has 7,722 MW of installed capacity)	31 TWh (110 PJ)	2,835 km^{2}	61.7 km^{3}	1979/1981	
Robert Moses Niagara Power Plant		United States	43°08′35″N 79°02′23″W		2,675 megawatts (3,587,000 hp)					
Rocky Reach Dam		United States	47°32′00″N 120°17′40″W		1,299.6 megawatts (1,742,800 hp)					
Roseires Dam		Sudan	18°40′10″N 32°03′10″E		1,800 megawatts (2,400,000 hp)					
Salto Grande Dam		Argentina; Uruguay	31°16′29″S 57°56′18″W		1,890 megawatts (2,530,000 hp)					
Salto Osório Hydroelectric Power Plant		Brazil	25°32′06″S 53°00′33″W		1,078 megawatts (1,446,000 hp)					
Salto Santiago Dam		Brazil	25°37′04″S 52°36′48″W		1,420 megawatts (1,900,000 hp)					
Sanbanxi Dam		China	26°36′21″N 109°02′57″E		1,000 megawatts (1,300,000 hp)					
San Carlos Hydroelectric Power Plant		Colombia	06°12′39″N 74°50′26″W		1,240 megawatts (1,660,000 hp)					
Santo Antonio Dam		Brazil	8°48′6″S 63°57′3″W	Madeira	3,568 megawatts (4,785,000 hp); 3,580 MW	21.2 TWh (76 PJ)	490 km^{2}		2012/2016	
Saratov Hydroelectric Station		Russia	52°03′11″N 47°45′18″E		1,481 megawatts (1,986,000 hp)					
Sardar Sarovar Dam	Image of a wall like structure located between mountains with curves at the bottom of it, some kind of plant and a rusty rail bar	India	21°49′49″N 73°44′50″E		1,450 megawatts (1,940,000 hp)					
Sayano-Shushenskaya Dam		Russia	52°49′31″N 91°22′15″E	Yenisei	6,400 megawatts (8,600,000 hp)	29.4 TWh (106 PJ)	621 km^{2}	31.3 km^{3}	1978/1985, 2010/2014 (Note: 10 units were installed between 1978 and 1985; after the 2009 failure, new units were installed between 2010 and 2014.)	
Serra da Mesa Hydroelectric Power Station		Brazil	24°58′23″S 53°28′19″W		1,275 megawatts (1,710,000 hp)					
Shatuo Dam		China	28°29′53″N 108°28′31″E		1,120 megawatts (1,500,000 hp)					
Shuibuya Dam		China	30°26′30″N 110°21′40″E		1,840 megawatts (2,470,000 hp)					
Shuikou Dam		China	26°18′7″N 118°48′48″E		1,400 megawatts (1,900,000 hp)					
Silin Dam		China	27°48′08″N 108°11′10″E		1,080 megawatts (1,450,000 hp)					
Sobradinho Dam		Brazil	09°28′00″S 40°48′30″W		1,050 megawatts (1,410,000 hp)					
Srisailam Dam	Aerial image of a river flowing from a concrete structure in the shape of a waterfall, with some forest in the background	India	16°05′12″N 78°53′48″E		1,670 megawatts (2,240,000 hp)					
Suwalong Dam		China	29°33′22″N 99°02′53″E		1,200 megawatts (1,600,000 hp)					
São Simão Hydroelectric Power Plant		Brazil	18°59′03″S 50°31′08″W		1,710 megawatts (2,290,000 hp)					
Sơn La Dam		Vietnam	21°29′47″N 103°59′42″E		2,400 megawatts (3,200,000 hp)					
Tala Hydroelectricity Project		Bhutan	27°02′09″N 89°35′49″E		1,020 megawatts (1,370,000 hp)					
Tarbela Dam		Pakistan	34°05′23″N 72°41′54″E	Indus	4,888 megawatts (6,555,000 hp)	17.39 TWh (62.6 PJ)	260 km^{2}	13.7 km^{3}	1976, 1992, 2018	(Note: planned final capacity 6,418 megawatts (8,607,000 hp))
Tehri Dam (Note: power station under construction)		India	30°22′40″N 78°28′50″E		1,400 megawatts (1,900,000 hp)					(Note: another is 1,000 MW under construction)
Teles Pires Dam		Brazil	09°20′26″S 56°46′37″W		1,820 megawatts (2,440,000 hp)					
Three Gorges Dam	Aerial view of a huge concrete structure located between the mountains, with buildings, power lines and construction and lifting cranes	China	30°49′15″N 111°00′08″E	Yangtze	22,500 megawatts (30,200,000 hp)	111.8 terawatt-hours (402 PJ)	1,084 km^{2}	39.3 km^{3}	2008/2012	
Tianshengqiao-I Dam		China	24°56′31″N 105°06′23″E		1,200 megawatts (1,600,000 hp)					
Tianshengqiao-II Dam		China	24°57′47″N 105°09′20″E		1,320 megawatts (1,770,000 hp)					
Tingzikou Dam		China	31°49′24″N 105°52′07″E		1,100 megawatts (1,500,000 hp)					
Toktogul Dam		Kyrgyzstan	41°48′23″N 72°52′27″E		1,260 megawatts (1,690,000 hp)					
Tucuruí Dam	Aerial view of a concrete structure, a low hill and massive amounts of water that spur in a waterfall like way from the structure	Brazil	03°49′54″S 49°38′48″W	Tocantins	8,370 megawatts (11,220,000 hp)	41.43 TWh (149.1 PJ)	3,014 km^{2}	45 km^{3}	1984, 2007	
Upper Gotvand Dam		Iran	32°12′58″N 48°56′09″E		1,000 megawatts (1,300,000 hp)					
Ust-Ilimsk Hydroelectric Station		Russia	57°58′06″N 102°41′45″E	Angara	3,840 megawatts (5,150,000 hp)	21.7 TWh (78 PJ)	1,873 km^{2}	59.4 km^{3}	1980	
Volga Hydroelectric Station		Russia	48°49′34″N 44°40′19″E		2,734 megawatts (3,666,000 hp)					
Votkinsk Hydroelectric Station		Russia	56°47′13″N 54°04′44″E		1,120 megawatts (1,500,000 hp)					
Wanapum Dam		United States	46°52′31″N 119°58′16″W		1,040 megawatts (1,390,000 hp)					
Wanjiazhai Dam		China	39°34′47″N 111°25′38″E		1,080 megawatts (1,450,000 hp)					
Wudongde Dam		China	26°20′02″N 102°37′48″E	Jinsha	10,200 megawatts (13,700,000 hp)	38.91 TWh (140.1 PJ)		7.4 km^{3}	2020/2021	
Wujiangdu Dam		China	27°19′10″N 106°45′39″E		1,130 megawatts (1,520,000 hp)					
Wuqiangxi Dam		China	28°46′33″N 110°55′39″E		1,200 megawatts (1,600,000 hp)					
Xayaburi Dam		Laos	19°15′14″N 101°48′49″E		1,285 megawatts (1,723,000 hp)					
Xiangjiaba Dam		China	28°38′57″N 104°22′14″E	Jinsha	7,798 megawatts (10,457,000 hp); 6,400 MW	30.88 TWh (111.2 PJ)	95.6 km^{2}	5.16 km^{3}	2014	
Xiaolangdi Dam		China	34°40′13″N 112°25′33″E		1,836 megawatts (2,462,000 hp)					
Xiaowan Dam		China	24°42′19″N 100°05′32″E	Mekong	4,200 megawatts (5,600,000 hp)	19 TWh (68 PJ)	190 km^{2}	15 km^{3}	2010	
Xiluodu Dam		China	28°15′52″N 103°38′47″E	Jinsha	13,860 megawatts (18,590,000 hp)	55.2 TWh (199 PJ)	108 km^{2}	12.67 km^{3}	2014	
Xingó Hydroelectrical Power Plant		Brazil	9°37′14″S 37°47′34″W	São Francisco	3,162 megawatts (4,240,000 hp)	18.7 TWh (67 PJ)	60 km^{2}	3.8 km^{3}	1994/1997	
Yacyretá Dam		Argentina; Paraguay	27°28′58″S 56°43′30″W	Paraná	3,100 megawatts (4,200,000 hp)	20.09 TWh (72.3 PJ)	1,695 km^{2}	21 km^{3}	1994/1998, 2011	
Yangqu Dam		China	35°42′4″N 100°16′8″E		1,200 megawatts (1,600,000 hp)					
Yantan Dam		China	24°02′26″N 107°30′45″E		1,210 megawatts (1,620,000 hp)					
Zeya Hydroelectric Station		Russia	53°48′00″N 127°23′00″E		1,330 megawatts (1,780,000 hp)					
Zhiguli Hydroelectric Station		Russia	53°26′42″N 49°29′24″E		2,488 megawatts (3,336,000 hp)					
Água Vermelha Dam		Brazil	19°56′59″S 49°53′54″W		1,396 megawatts (1,872,000 hp)					

== Under construction ==
This table lists stations under construction with an expected installed capacity at least 3,000 MW.

Name	Country	Location	River	Expected capacity (MW)	Expected completion
Medog	China	29°27′37″N 95°21′48″E	Yarlung Tsangpo	60,000 megawatts (80,000,000 hp)	2033
Tasang	Myanmar	20°27′23″N 98°39′0″E	Salween	7,110 megawatts (9,530,000 hp)	? (on hold)
Diamer-Bhasha	Pakistan	35°31′08″N 73°47′10″E	Indus River	4,500 megawatts (6,000,000 hp)	2029
Dasu	Pakistan	35°31′10″N 73°44′21″E	Indus River	4,320 megawatts (5,790,000 hp)	2029
Rogun	Tajikistan	38°41′03″N 69°46′26″E	Vakhsh	3,780 megawatts (5,070,000 hp) (Note: 760 MW commissioned as of October 2021)	2018-2029
Myitsone	Myanmar	25°41′23″N 97°31′04″E	Irrawaddy	3,600 megawatts (4,800,000 hp)	? (suspended)

== See also ==
- List of largest dams
- List of largest power stations
- List of pumped-storage hydroelectric power stations
- List of run-of-the-river hydroelectric power stations
- List of tallest dams
- List of hydroelectric power station failures
