= China Yangtze Power =

Chinese electric power company

Yangtze Power
- Type: Public
- Traded as: SSE: 600900; SSE MidCap Component; CSI A50
- Industry: Hydroelectricity
- Founded: 2002; 24 years ago
- Headquarters: Beijing, China
- Area served: China
- Key people: Li Yongan (chairman)
- Parent: China Three Gorges (61.92%)
- Website: www.cypc-cn.com

China Yangtze Power Co., Ltd.
- Simplified Chinese: 中国长江电力股份有限公司
- Traditional Chinese: 中國長江電力股份有限公司
- Literal meaning: China Yangtze Electricity Joint-Stock Limited Company
Transcriptions
Standard Mandarin
- Hanyu Pinyin: Zhōngguó chángjiāng diànlì gǔfèn yǒuxiàn gōngsī

Yangtze Power
- Simplified Chinese: 长江电力
- Traditional Chinese: 長江電力
Transcriptions
Standard Mandarin
- Hanyu Pinyin: chángjiāng diànlì

China Yangtze Power Co., Ltd. (CYPC), known as Yangtze Power is a Chinese utilities company, headquartered in Beijing. The company is a component of SSE 180 Index. A controlling share is held by the parent company China Three Gorges Corporation (CTG, Chinese: 中国长江三峡集团公司), a state-owned enterprise under State-owned Assets Supervision and Administration Commission of the State Council.

The enterprise produces and sells energy to customers. China Yangtze Power was founded on 4 November 2002 and was brought on 18 November 2003 to the Shanghai Stock Exchange. China Yangtze Power originated from a cooperation of Chinese enterprises: Huaneng Power International, China National Nuclear Corporation, China National Petroleum Corporation, Gezhouba Water Resources and Hydropower Engineering Group as well as the Changjiang Institute of Survey, Planning, Design and Research.

== Three Gorges Dam Hydroelectric Plants ==
The Three Gorges Dam above ground hydroelectric plant became fully operational in 2010 and has an installed capacity of 18.2GW (26 x 700MW). These units have been progressively acquired from the majority owner China Three Gorges Corporation as they have been built. A final underground hydroelectric plant is expected to be transferred by 2012.

== Other Hydroelectric Plants ==
The company is the operator of other Yangtze hydroelectric plants – Xiluodu Dam (13,860 MW), Xiangjiaba Dam (6,448 MW) and Gezhouba Dam (2,715 MW). Two other are under construction – Baihetan Dam (16,000 MW) and Wudongde Dam (10,200 MW).

== Marketing ==
The company sells its electricity via China State Grid Corporation mainly to Central China (Hubei, Hunan, Henan, Jiangxi and Chongqing), East China (Shanghai, Jiangsu, Zhejiang and Anhui) and Guangdong Province.
