= Industry in China =

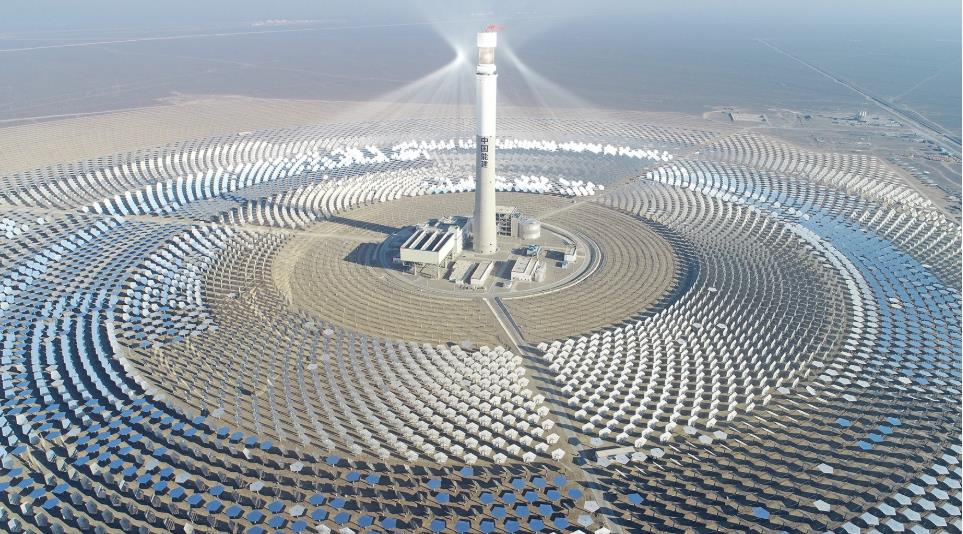
A 50 MW molten-salt power tower in Hami, Xinjiang, China

The industrial sector comprised 36.5% of the gross domestic product (GDP) of the People's Republic of China in 2024. China is the world's leading manufacturer of chemical fertilizers, cement and steel. Prior to 1978, most output was produced by state-owned enterprises. As a result of the reform and opening up that followed, there was a significant increase in production by enterprises sponsored by local governments, especially townships and villages, and, increasingly, by private entrepreneurs and foreign investors, but by 1990 the state sector accounted for about 70 percent of output. By 2002 the share in gross industrial output by state-owned and state-holding industries had decreased with the state-run enterprises themselves accounting for 46 percent of China's industrial output. In November, 2012 the State Council mandated a "social risk assessment" for all major industrial projects. This requirement followed mass public protests in some locations for planned projects or expansions.

== History ==
China ranks first worldwide in industrial output. Major industries include mining and ore processing; iron and steel; aluminium; coal; machinery; armaments; textiles and apparel; petroleum; cement; chemical; fertilizers; food processing; automobiles and other transportation equipment including rail cars and locomotives, ships, and aircraft; consumer products including footwear, toys, and electronics; telecommunications and information technology. China has become a preferred destination for the relocation of global manufacturing facilities. Its strength as an export platform has contributed to incomes and employment in China. The state-owned sector still accounts for about 40% of GDP. In recent years, authorities have been giving greater attention to the management of state assets—both in the financial market as well as among state-owned-enterprises—and progress has been noteworthy.

=== 1949–1978: State-led industrial development ===
Following the establishment of the People's Republic of China in 1949, the government implemented a Soviet-style centrally planned economy, prioritizing heavy industries such as steel, coal, and machinery. The First Five-Year Plan (1953–1957), with technical and financial support from the Soviet Union, led to significant industrial growth and the formation of a basic national industrial framework. During this period, 156 major industrial projects were launched, including large-scale enterprises in military production, metallurgy, chemicals, machinery, and energy. These efforts aimed to build a relatively complete industrial base and modern national defense system, significantly raising China's industrial capacity and technological level to one comparable with that of advanced countries in the 1940s. However, the system was characterized by high input reliance, low efficiency, and imbalanced output structures, including chronic overproduction in some sectors.

Since the founding of the People's Republic, industrial development has been given considerable attention. Article 35 of the 1949 Common Program adopted by the Chinese People's Political Consultative Conference emphasized the development of heavy industry, such as mining, iron and steel, power, machinery, electrical industry, and the chemical industry "in order to build a foundation for the industrialization of the nation."

Between 1958 and 1962, the Great Leap Forward aimed to accelerate industrialization through rural collectivization and mass mobilization. This campaign caused severe disruptions to both agriculture and industry, and is widely associated with a major famine that resulted in tens of millions of deaths. The subsequent Cultural Revolution (1966–1976) further destabilized the industrial sector, as many technical experts and administrators were purged, leading to administrative paralysis and production inefficiencies.

Despite these setbacks, China had, by 1978, developed a foundational industrial base dominated by state-owned enterprises in sectors such as chemicals, metallurgy, and machinery. Industrial growth during the 1957–1978 period averaged approximately 8.8 percent annually, though growth rates fluctuated considerably from year to year. According to scholars, persistent inefficiencies within the command economy model contributed to the eventual launch of economic reforms at the end of the 1970s.

During the Third Five-Year Plan period, the Chinese government embarked on the Third Front campaign to develop industrial and military facilities in the country's interior in preparation for defending against the risk of invasion by the Soviet Union or the United States. Through its distribution of infrastructure, industry, and human capital around the country, the Third Front created favorable conditions for subsequent market development and private enterprise.

=== 1978–Present: Industrial reform, growth, and modernization ===
Since the launch of economic reforms in 1978, China's industrial sector has undergone profound structural transformation. The shift from a centrally planned economy to a market-oriented system led to the diversification of ownership forms, the expansion of manufacturing, and the gradual rise of China as a global industrial power.

==== Reform and ownership transformation ====
In the early reform years, the state began loosening direct control over industrial enterprises. The state-owned enterprise (SOE) system, which dominated China's industrial landscape in the pre-reform era, was gradually restructured. From the mid-1980s onward, policies encouraged managerial autonomy, profit retention, and performance-based contracts. During the 1990s, large-scale SOE reforms led to widespread privatization and the emergence of shareholding systems. Many small and medium-sized SOEs were closed or merged, while key large enterprises were corporatized and listed on stock markets, both domestically and abroad.

At the same time, non-state industrial sectors expanded rapidly.Township and village enterprises (TVEs) emerged as a dynamic force in rural industrialization during the 1980s and early 1990s. Private enterprises were gradually legalized and expanded into manufacturing, textiles, electronics, and other light industries. By the early 2000s, non-state enterprises accounted for the majority of industrial output value.

==== Export-oriented manufacturing and WTO integration ====
China's accession to the World Trade Organization (WTO) in 2001 further accelerated its industrial development. China's industrial base became increasingly export-oriented, with labor-intensive manufacturing—such as garments, electronics, and toys—playing a central role.Foreign direct investment (FDI), particularly in coastal provinces, introduced advanced technologies and management practices. Joint ventures and wholly foreign-owned enterprises flourished in sectors like automotive, consumer electronics, and telecommunications.

Between 2001 and 2010, China became known as the "world's factory," producing a growing share of global manufactured goods. By 2010, it had overtaken the United States to become the world's largest manufacturing nation by value added.

Following its 2001 entry into the World Trade Organization, China quickly developed a reputation as the "world's factory" through its manufacturing exports. The complexity of its exports increased over time, and as of 2019 it accounts for approximately 25% of all high tech goods produced globally.

Since 2010, China has had the world's largest construction market.

==== Industrial upgrading and innovation ====
In the 2010s, Chinese policymakers prioritized shifting from low-end manufacturing to higher-value-added, innovation-driven industries. The “Made in China 2025” initiative, launched in 2015, aimed to upgrade ten key industrial sectors, including robotics, aerospace, advanced rail equipment, new energy vehicles, and medical devices. The goal was to enhance domestic technological capabilities and reduce dependence on imported components and equipment. Research and development (R&D) spending increased significantly, with industrial firms becoming major contributors. The proportion of Chinese manufactured goods at the higher end of the value chain grew after the early 2000s and accelerated further after 2020. As of the early 2020s, China ranked among the top global countries in manufacturing output for high-tech industries, such as solar panels, 5G equipment, and electric vehicles. Government policies supported strategic emerging industries through subsidies, tax incentives, and industrial parks.

State-owned enterprises continued to dominate in strategic sectors such as energy, telecommunications, and heavy industry, while the private sector and foreign-invested firms played leading roles in consumer goods, light industry, and technology manufacturing.

Beginning in 2010 and continuing through at least 2023, China has produced more industrial goods per year than any other country. It is also the world's largest user of industrial robots.

== Data ==
In 2018-2019, 37.6% of industrial assets were privately owned.

According to the National Bureau of Statistics of China, the proportion of the output value of the secondary industry (including construction) in the China's GDP and the proportion of the number of employees in the total number of employees are shown in the following table:

year	Proportion of secondary industry output value in GDP (%)	Industrial output as a percentage of GDP (%)	Share of secondary industry in total employment (%)
1952	20.7	17.6	7.4
1960	44.3	39.0	15.9
1970	40.2	36.6	10.2
1980	48.0	43.8	18.2
1985	42.6	38.2	20.8
1990	41.0	36.5	21.4
1995	46.5	40.6	23.0
2000	45.1	39.7	22.5
2001	44.3	39.1	22.3
2002	43.9	38.7	21.4
2003	45.0	39.7	21.6
2004	45.2	40.1	22.5
2005	46.4	41.1	23.8
2006	46.9	41.4	25.2
2007	46.2	40.7	26.8
2008	46.2	40.6	27.2
2009	45.2	39.0	27.8
2010	45.7	39.4	28.7
2011	45.8	39.4	29.6
2012	44.7	38.2	30.5
2013	43.4	36.8	30.3
2014	42.3	35.6	30.2
2015	40.0	33.4	29.7
2016	38.8	32.2	29.2
2017	39.1	32.5	28.6
2018	39.0	32.2	28.2
2019	37.8	30.9	28.1
2020	36.9	30.1	28.7
2021	38.1	31.5	29.1

== Machinery manufacturing ==
China's machinery manufacturing industry can provide complete sets of large advanced equipment, including large gas turbines, large pump storage groups, and nuclear power sets, ultra-high voltage direct-current transmission and transformer equipment, complete sets of large metallurgical, fertilizer and petro-chemical equipment, urban light rail transport equipment, and new papermaking and textile machinery. Machinery and transportation equipment have been the mainstay products of Chinese exports, as China's leading export sector for successive 11 years from 1996 to 2006. In 2006, the export value of machinery and transportation equipment reached 425 billion US dollars, 28.3 percent more than 2005.

== Energy policy ==
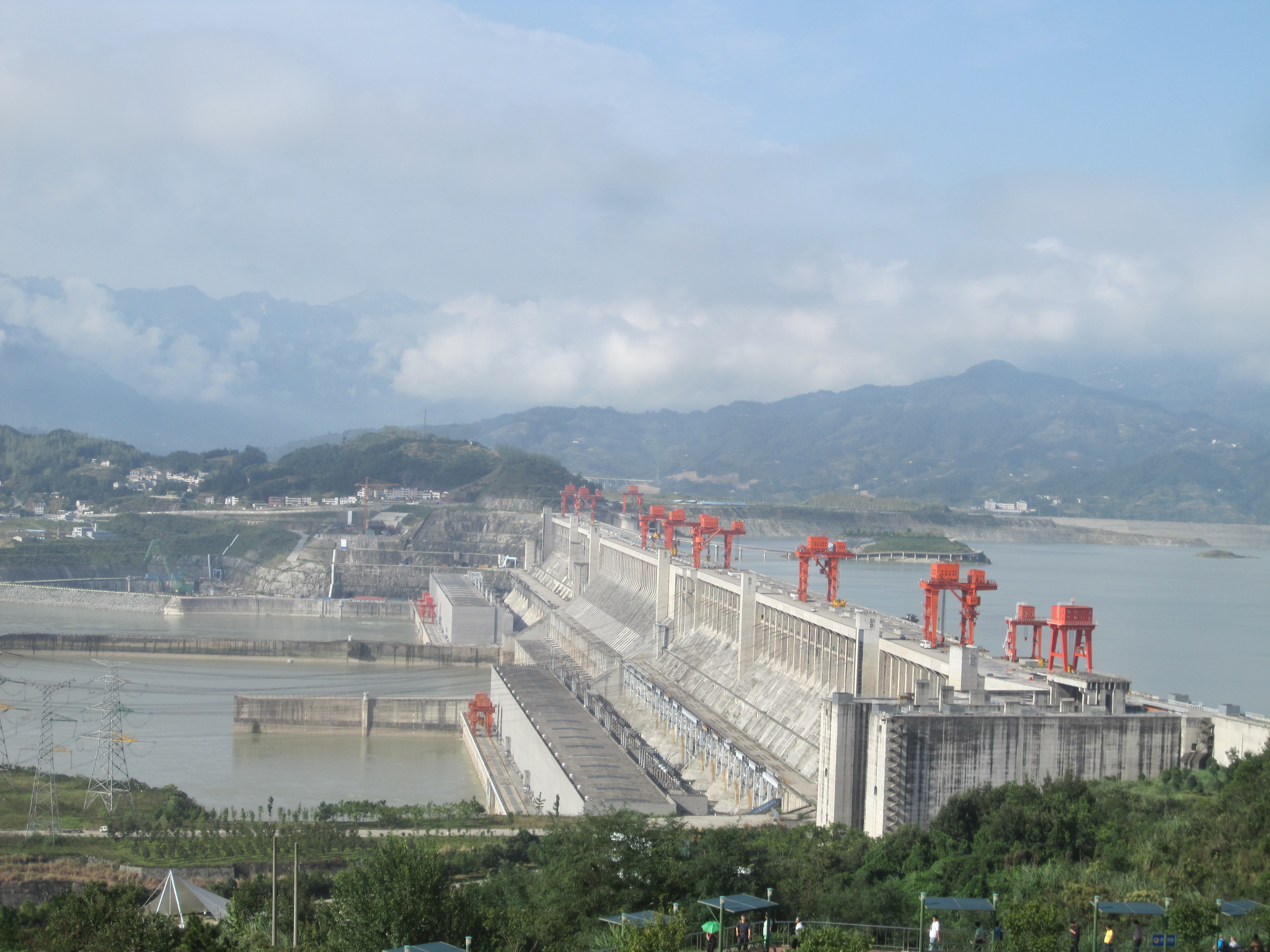
The world's largest hydropower plant, the Three Gorges Dam, Yangtze River, China

The People's Republic of China is both the world's largest energy consumer and the largest industrial country. China is currently the world's largest emitter of greenhouse gases, and coal in China is a major cause of global warming. China is also the world's largest renewable energy producer, and the largest producer of hydroelectricity, solar power and wind power in the world. The energy policy of China is connected to its industrial policy, where the goals of China's industrial production dictate its energy demand management.

== Automotive ==
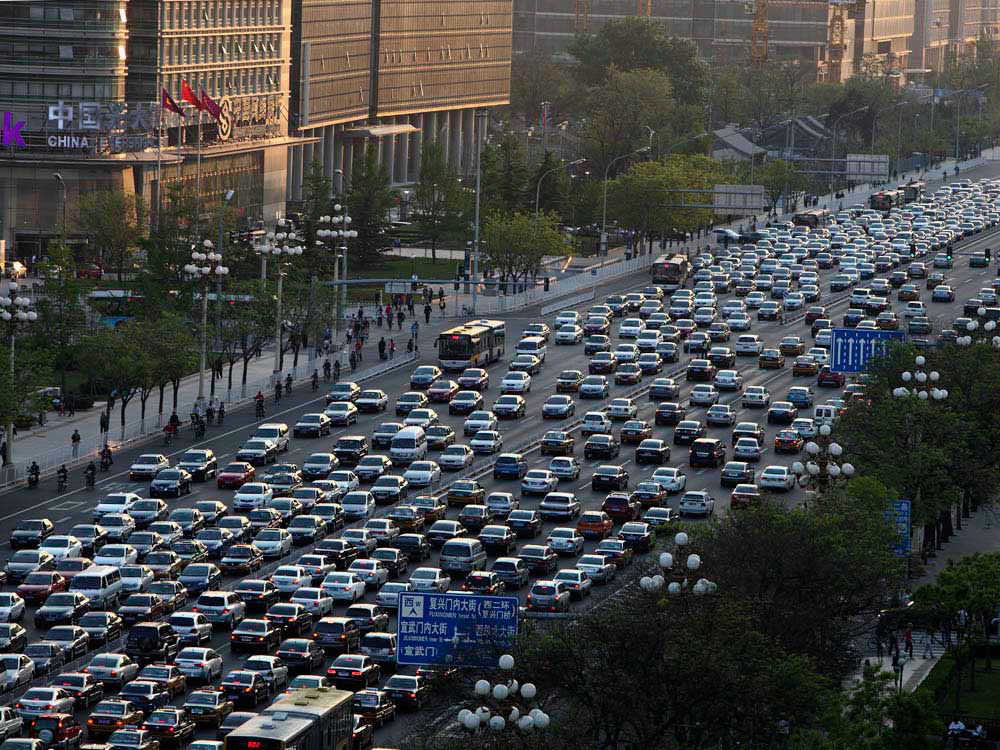
Chang'an avenue in Beijing

The automotive industry in China has been the largest in the world measured by automobile unit production since 2008. As of 2024, China is also the world's largest automobile market both in terms of sales and ownership.

== Steel ==
The steel industry of the People's Republic of China, initially small and hindered by war, expanded rapidly following market reforms in 1978, eventually becoming the world's largest producer. Despite this growth, the industry faced challenges with high debt, market volatility, and environmental pressures. Rising exports from 2023-2024 led to global oversupply, price drops, and tariffs, prompting China to halt new steel mill approvals and encourage overseas investments. China's central government has also worked to phase out unprofitable "zombie" companies while pushing for stricter environmental controls on steel production.

== Mining ==
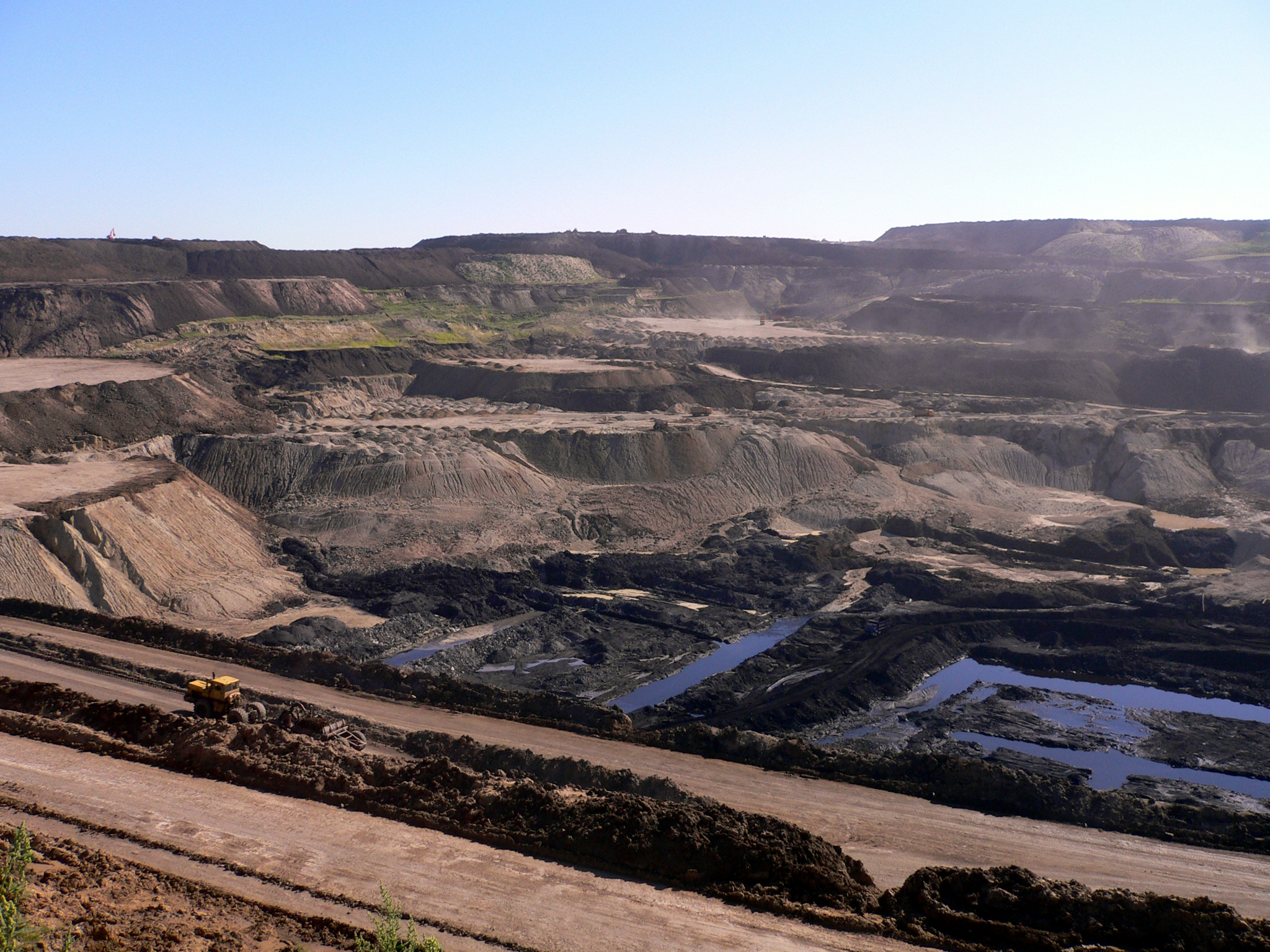
A coal mine near Hailar District

As of 2022, more than 200 types of minerals are actively explored or mined in the People's Republic of China (PRC). These resources are widely but not evenly distributed throughout the country. Taken as a whole, China's economy and exports do not rely on the mining industry, but the industry is critical to various subnational governments of the PRC.

Mining is extensively regulated in the PRC and involves numerous regulatory bodies. The state owns all mineral rights, regardless of the ownership of the land on which the minerals are located. Mining rights can be obtained upon government approval, and payment of mining and prospecting fees.

During the Mao Zedong era, mineral exploration and mining was limited to state-owned enterprises and collectively owned enterprises and private exploration of mineral resources was largely prohibited. The industry was opened to private enterprises during the reform and opening up in the 1980s and became increasingly marketized in the 1990s. In the mid-2000s, the Chinese government sought to consolidate the industry due to concerns about underutilization of resources, workplace safety, and environmental harm. During that period, state-owned enterprises purchased smaller privately owned mines. China's mining industry grew substantially and the period from the early 2000s to 2012 is often referred to as a "golden decade" in the mining industry.

== Information technology ==
=== Computer industry ===
China started operating supercomputers some two decades after the first supercomputer was fielded with the "Yinhe-1" in 1983.

=== Internet ===
The People's Republic of China has been on the Internet intermittently since May 1989 and on a permanent basis since 20 April 1994. In 2008, China became the country with the largest population on the Internet; as of 2025, it has remained so. As of December 2024, 1.09 billion people (77.5% of the country's total population) use the internet.

== Energy ==
=== Electric power industry ===
By the end of 2024, China's total installed power generation capacity reached 3,348.62 million kilowatts. This included 1,444.45 million kilowatts of thermal power, 435.95 million kilowatts of hydropower, 60.83 million kilowatts of nuclear power, 520.68 million kilowatts of grid-connected wind power, and 886.66 million kilowatts of grid-connected solar power. The continued expansion of non-fossil fuel sources, particularly wind and solar energy, reflects China's efforts to diversify its energy mix and promote cleaner electricity generation. These developments align with China's stated goals of achieving carbon peaking by 2030 and carbon neutrality by 2060.

==== Hydropower ====
China possesses the world's largest installed hydropower capacity. As of the end of 2024, the total capacity reached approximately 436 gigawatts, with major hydroelectric projects located along the Yangtze and its tributaries. Prominent facilities include the Three Gorges Dam, Baihetan Dam, and Xiluodu Dam, each among the largest hydropower stations in the world.

State-owned enterprises such as China Three Gorges Corporation and China Huadian Corporation lead the sector, contributing to energy security, renewable energy expansion, and peak-load balancing.

==== Nuclear power ====
The People's Republic of China ranks third in the world both in total nuclear power capacity installed and electricity generated, accounting for around one tenth of global nuclear power generated. As of December 31, 2024, mainland China operated a total of 57 nuclear power units, with a combined installed capacity of 59,431.7 MWe (rated capacity). In 2024, nuclear power plants generated 445.175 billion kilowatt-hours of electricity, representing approximately 4.73% of mainland China's total electricity generation of 9,418.34 billion kilowatt-hours.

==== Wind power ====
The People's Republic of China has developed one of the world's largest wind power industries. As of the end of 2024, the country's installed wind power capacity reached approximately 521 gigawatts, marking an 18% increase from the previous year. This expansion is part of China's broader efforts to diversify its energy mix and reduce carbon emissions. The development of wind energy has been supported by national policies and strategic investments outlined in successive five-year plans.

The People's Republic of China is also home to several of the world's leading wind turbine manufacturers. In 2024, Chinese companies including Goldwind, Envision, and Mingyang Wind Power ranked among the top three globally in terms of wind turbine installations, collectively accounting for a significant share of the global market. These manufacturers operate across a comprehensive industrial chain encompassing equipment design, production, and deployment. In parallel, major state-owned enterprises such as China Huaneng Group and China Datang Corporation play central roles in wind farm construction and operation, contributing to the sector's rapid growth.

Wind farms are predominantly located in northern, northeastern, and northwestern regions, including Inner Mongolia, Xinjiang, and Hebei, with a growing presence of offshore wind projects along the eastern coastline. The rapid growth of wind energy contributes significantly to China's transition toward a low-carbon energy system and its stated goals of peaking carbon emissions by 2030 and achieving carbon neutrality by 2060.

== Petroleum ==
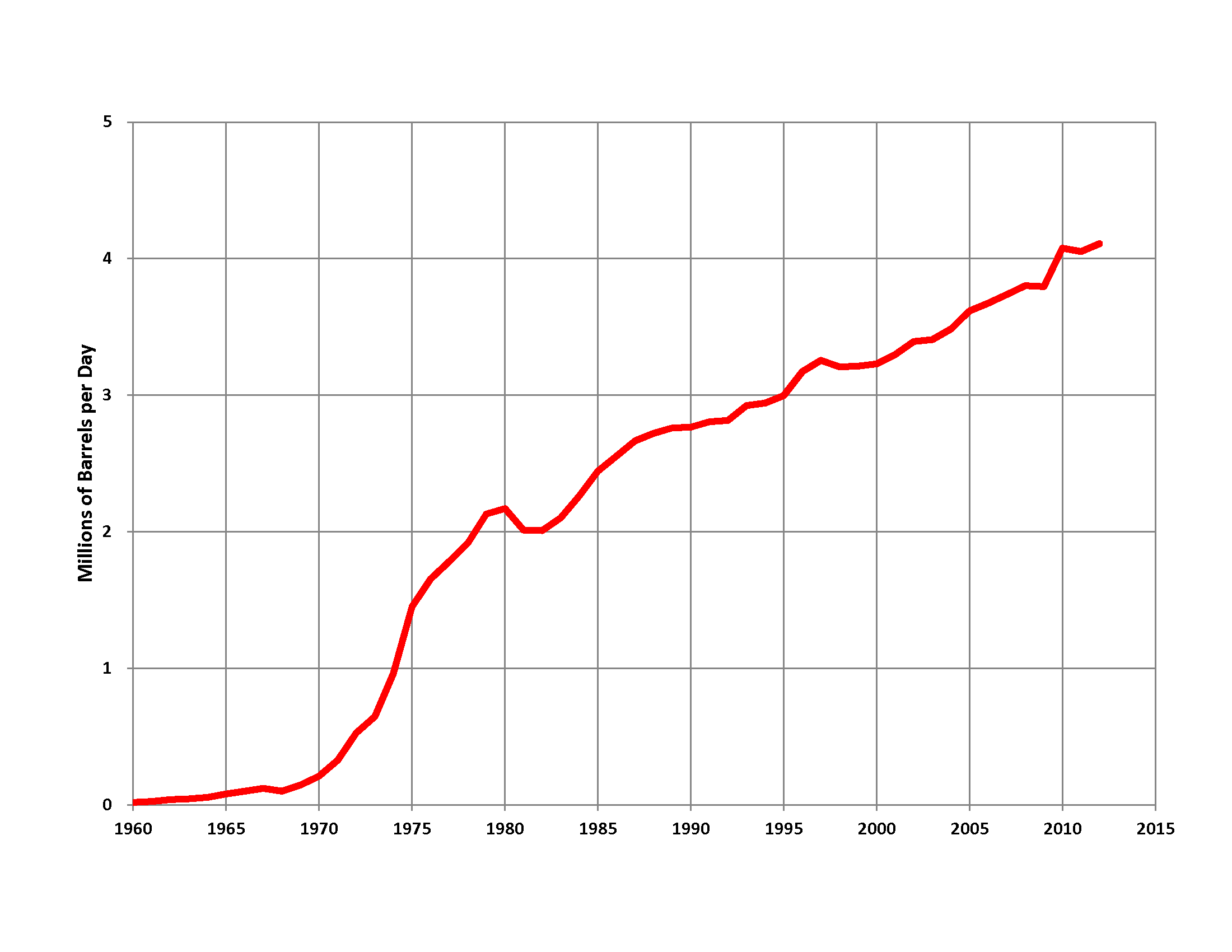
Chinese oil production from 1960 to 2015

The petroleum industry in China has evolved from small-scale exploration during the Qing dynasty to one of the largest in the world since the founding of the People's Republic of China. Domestic oil production began in earnest in the 1950s, with major discoveries such as the Daqing and Shengli oil fields transforming the country into a net oil exporter by the 1970s. However, rising domestic demand led China to become a net oil importer by 1993 and the world's largest oil importer by 2013. To safeguard its energy security, China has developed a large "Strategic Petroleum Reserve" and expanded foreign oil investments through state-owned enterprises. Oil remains a critical component of China's energy policy, economic planning, and geopolitical strategy.

== See also ==
- Pollution in China
- Environmental issues in China
