= Ultra-high-voltage electricity transmission in China =

Ultra high voltage transmission of electricity (UHV electricity transmission) has been used in the People's Republic of China since 2009 to transmit both alternating current (AC) and direct current (DC) electricity over long distances separating China's energy resources and consumers.

Since 2004, the electricity sector in China has been growing at an unprecedented rate due to the rapid growth in industry of China. A serious supply shortage during 2005 had impacted the operation of many Chinese companies, which led to the country aggressively investing in their electricity supply in order to fulfil the demand from industries and hence secure economic growth. The installed electricity generation capacity has increased from 443 GW at end of 2004 to 793 GW at the end of 2008. The increment in these four years is equivalent to approximately one-third of the total generation capacity of the United States, or 1.4 times the total capacity of Japan. During the same period of time, annual energy consumption has also risen from 2,197 TWh to 3,426 TWh. China's annual electricity consumption is expected to reach 6,800–6,900 TWh by 2018, up from 4,690 TWh in 2011, with the installed capacity reaching 1,463 GW up from 1,056 GW in 2011, of which 342 GW is hydropower, 928 GW coal-fired, 100 GW wind, 43 GW nuclear, and 40 GW natural gas. China is the country with the largest consumption of electricity as of 2011.

China's Twelfth Five-Year Plan (covering the period 2011 to 2015) provided for the development of an ultra-high-voltage (UHV) transmission corridor to increase the integration of renewable energy from the point of generation to its point of consumption.

== Transmission and distribution ==
On the transmission and distribution side, the country has focused on expanding capacity and reducing losses by:

1. deploying long-distance ultra-high-voltage direct current (UHVDC) and ultra-high-voltage alternating current (UHVAC) transmission
2. installing high-efficiency amorphous metal transformers

== UHV transmission worldwide ==
Ultra-high-voltage overhead power lines circuits have long been in use in many parts of the world. For example, 2,362 km of 1,150 kV circuits were built in the former USSR, and 427 km of 1,000 kV AC circuits have been developed in Japan (Kita-Iwaki powerline). Experimental lines of various scales are also found in many countries. However, most of these lines are currently operating at a lower voltage due to insufficient power demand or other reasons.

In 2015, the State Grid Corporation of China proposed the Global Energy Interconnection, a long-term proposal to develop globally integrated smart grids and ultra high voltage transmission networks to connect over 80 countries. The idea is supported by CCP general secretary Xi Jinping and his leadership in his attempt to develop support in various internal forums, including UN bodies.

== Reasons for UHV transmission in China ==
China's focus on UHV transmission is partly driven by the geographic separation between major energy resources and demand centres. A significant share of China's solar power capacity is located in the solar-rich, sparsely populated western and northern regions, while studies have found that more than 99% of the country's technical potential for concentrated solar power is located in the western provinces of Xinjiang, Inner Mongolia, Qinghai, Gansu, and Tibet. The majority of the hydropower resources are in the west, while coal resources are concentrated in the northwest. Major electricity demands, however, is concentrated in the east and south, including major cities such as Beijing and Shanghai. To reduce transmission losses over these long distances, UHV transmission is a logical choice. At the 2009 International Conference on UHV Power Transmission in Beijing, the State Grid Corporation of China announced plans to invest RMB 600 billion (approximately US$88 billion) in UHV development by 2020.

Implementation of the UHV grid enables the construction of newer, cleaner, more efficient power generation plants far from population centers. Older power plants along the coast will be retired. This will lower the total current amount of pollution, as well as the pollution felt by citizens within urban dwellings. The use of large central power plants providing electric heating are also less polluting than individual boilers used for winter heating in many northern households. The UHV grid will aid China's plan of electrification and decarbonization, and enable integration of renewable energy by removing the transmission bottleneck that is currently limiting expansions in wind and solar generation capacity whilst further developing the market for long-range electric vehicles in China.

== UHV circuits completed or under construction ==
As of 2023, the operational UHV circuits are:

Name (Chinese)	Type	Voltage (kV)	Length (km)	Power rating (GW)	Year Completed
Jindongnan–Nanyang–Jingmen (晋东南-南阳-荆门)	AC	1000	654	5.0	January 2009
Yunnan - Guangdong (云南-广东)	HVDC	±800	1438	5	June 2010
Xiangjiaba–Shanghai (向家坝-上海)	HVDC	±800	1907	6.4	July 2010
Jinping – Southern Jiangsu (锦屏-苏南)	HVDC	±800	2059	7.2	December 2012
Huainan–Zhejiang North–Shanghai (淮南-浙北-上海)	AC	1000	2×649	8.0	September 2013
Nuozadu - Guangdong (糯扎渡-广东)	HVDC	±800	1413	5	May 2015
Hami – Zhengzhou (哈密-郑州)	HVDC	±800	2210	8	January 2014
Xiluodu - Zhejiang West (溪洛渡-浙西)	HVDC	±800	1680	8	July 2014
Zhejiang North - Fuzhou (浙北-福州)	AC	1000	2×603	6.8	December 2014
Huainan–Nanjing–Shanghai (淮南-南京-上海)	AC	1000	2×780		November 2016
Xilingol League - Shandong (锡盟-山东)	AC	1000	2×730	9	July 2016
Lingzhou - Shaoxing (灵州-绍兴)	HVDC	±800	1720	8	September 2016
Inner Mongolia West - Tianjin (蒙西-天津南)	AC	1000	2×608	5	December 2016
Jiuquan–Hunan (酒泉-湖南)	HVDC	±800	2383	8	June 2017
Shanxi North–Jiangsu (晋北-江苏)	HVDC	±800	1119	8	July 2017
Xilingol League - Shengli (锡盟-胜利)	AC	1000	2x236.8		August 2017
Yuheng–Weifang (榆横-潍坊)	AC	1000	2×1050		August 2017
Xilingol League–Jiangsu (锡盟-江苏)	HVDC	±800	1620	10	October 2017
Zhalute–Qingzhou (扎鲁特—青州)	HVDC	±800	1234	10	December 2017
Shanghaimiao–Linyi (上海庙-临沂)	HVDC	±800	1238	10	December 2017
Dianxi-Guangdong (滇西-广东)	HVDC	±800	1959	5	December 2017
Zhundong–South Anhui (准东-皖南)	HVDC	±1100	3293	12	December 2018
Shijiazhuang–Xiong'an (石家庄-雄安)	AC	1000	2×222.6		June 2019
Weifang-Linyi-Zaozhuang-Heze-Shijiazhuang (潍坊-临沂-枣庄-菏泽-石家庄)	AC	1000	2×823.6		January 2020
Zhangbei-Xiong'an (张北-雄安)	AC	1000	2×319.9		August 2020
Mengxi-Jinzhong (蒙西-晋中)	AC	1000	2x304		October 2020
Qinghai-Henan (青海-河南)	HVDC	±800	1587	8	December 2020
Wudongde-Guangxi-Guangdong (昆柳龙直流工程)	HVDC	±800	1489	8	December 2020
Zhangbei-Xiong'an (张北-雄安)	AC	1000	2×319.9		December 2020
Zhumadian-Nanyang (驻马店-南阳)	AC	1000	186.6		December 2020
Yazhong-Jiangxi (雅中-江西)	HVDC	±800	1711	8	June 2021
Shanbei-Hubei (陕北-湖北)	HVDC	±800	1127	8	August 2021
Nanchang-Changsha (南昌-长沙)	AC	1000	2×341		December 2021
Baihetan-Jiangsu (白鹤滩-江苏)	HVDC	±800	2087	8.0	July 2022
Nanyang-Jingmen-Changsha (南阳-荆门-长沙)	AC	1000			October 2022
Wuhan-Jingmen-Changsha (武汉-荆门)	AC	1000	2x233		December 2022
Baihetan-Zhejiang (白鹤滩-浙江)	HVDC	±800	2193	8	December 2022
Wuhan-Zhumadian (武汉-驻马店)	AC	1000	2x287		November 2023
Fuzhou-Xiamen (福州-厦门)	AC	1000	2x238		December 2023
Zhangbei-Shengli (张北-胜利)	AC	1000	2×366		October 2024
Wuhan-Nanchang (武汉-南昌)	AC	1000	2x456.6		November 2024
Sichuan-Chongqing (四川-重庆)	AC	1000	2x658	4-4,8	December 2024
Xaoping-Shandong (陇东-山东)	HVDC	±800	926	8	May 2025
Hami-Chongqing (哈密-重庆)	HVDC	±800	2260	8	June 2025
Ningxia-Hunan (宁夏-湖南)	HVDC	±800	1634	8	June 2025
Jinshang-Hubei (金上-湖北)	HVDC	±800	1901	8	September 2025
Shaanbei-Anhui (陕北-安徽)	HVDC	±800	1069	8	June 2026
Yantai-Weihai (烟台-威海)	AC	1000	2x565		October 2026

The under-construction/In preparation UHV lines are:

Name (Chinese)	Type	Voltage (kV)	Length (km)	Power rating (GW)	Year started
Aba-Chengdu East(阿坝-成都东)	AC	1000	2x371.7		July 2024
Gansu-Zhejiang (甘肃-浙江)	HVDC	±800	2370	8	July 2024
Geermu-Guangxi (格尔木-广西)	HVDC	±800	2884	8	February 2025
Datong-Huailai-Tianjin South (大同-怀来-天津南)	AC	1000	2x770		March 2025
SE Tibet-Guangdong (藏东南-粤港澳大湾区)	HVDC	±800	2681	10	September 2025
Inner Mongolia West - Beijing-Tianjin-Hebei(蒙西-京津冀)	HVDC	±800	700	8	December 2025
Panxi-Chuannan-Tianfu South (攀西-川南-天府南)	AC	1000	2x994		March 2026
Zhejiang Ring (浙江环网)	AC	1000	2x508		April 2026
Dalate-Mengxi (达拉特-蒙西)	AC	1000	2x124.4		June 2026

== See also ==
- Southern Hami–Zhengzhou UHVDC
- Electricity sector in China

== Sources ==
- Curtis, Simon; Klaus, Ian (2024). The Belt and Road City: Geopolitics, Urbanization, and China's Search for a New International Order. Yale University Press. doi:10.2307/jj.11589102. ISBN 978-0-300-26690-0. JSTOR jj.11589102.
- Lewis, Joanna I. (2023). Cooperating for the Climate. doi:10.7551/mitpress/11959.001.0001. ISBN 978-0-262-37264-0.
