= China Three Gorges Corporation =

Chinese state-owned company

- Native name: 中国长江三峡集团公司
- Type: State-owned enterprise
- Industry: Electricity
- Founded: 27 September 1993
- Headquarters: Wuhan, China
- Area served: Worldwide
- Revenue: CN¥63.0 billion (2014)
- Net income: CN¥26.0 billion (2014)
- Total assets: CN¥280.98 billion
- Owner: SASAC
- Number of employees: 18,121 (2013)
- Subsidiaries: China Yangtze Power; EDP (23.15%)
- Website: www.ctg.com.cn

The China Three Gorges Corporation (CTG; Chinese: 中国长江三峡集团公司) is a Chinese state-owned power company, established on 27 September 1993. The company was responsible for the construction of the Three Gorges Dam-project, the world's largest hydroelectric power plant, that went into operation in 2008. In September 2002, CTG established the subsidiary company China Yangtze Power, which took over operations and management of Gezhouba and Three Gorges dams. CTG is one of the world's largest energy companies with total assets of RMB 475.5 billion (app. USD 77.3 billion) in 2014. Other than hydroelectric dams, the company also operates onshore and offshore wind farms.

== Business ==
Apart from Gezhouba and the Three Gorges Dam, CTG operates and develops other hydroelectric projects on the Yangtze River - Xiangjiaba Dam, Xiluodu Dam, Baihetan Dam (the world's second largest hydroelectric power plant) and Wudongde Dam. By the end of 2014 CTG had 46.3 GW of total hydropower installed capacity in China and over 28 GW of total installed capacity under construction or development.

CTG started to develop wind power in 2007 and also entered the solar power industry in 2011. By 2014, it had 31 wind power projects in operation and additionally 33 under construction or development. It also had 37 solar power projects in operation and 18 under construction or development. Total installed capacity at the time was 3,707 MW in operation, with 3,050 MW under construction or development.

As of the end of 2013, CTG had business in 37 countries and regions, with 84 ongoing international construction and investment projects. In December 2011, China Three Gorges Corporation acquired a 21.35% Portuguese government's stake in Energias de Portugal for €2.69 billion.

In December 2011 China Three Gorges Corporation paid HK$2.1 billion (US$270 million) for a 29% stake in China Power New Energy Development.

China Yangtze River Three Gorges Corporation is involved in developing, building, and operating hydroelectric power facilities in Brazil. As of 2026, Three Gorges Corporation has five projects in Brazil valued at USD 5.4 billion in power generation. The company also invests in Bolivia, Ecuador, and Chile.

== U.S. sanctions ==
In August 2020, the United States Department of Defense published the names of companies with links to the People's Liberation Army operating directly or indirectly in the United States. CTG was included on the list. In November 2020, Donald Trump issued an executive order prohibiting any American company or individual from owning shares in companies that the United States Department of Defense has listed as having links to the People's Liberation Army, which included CTG. In January 2024, the United States Department of Defense named CTG on its list of "Chinese Military Companies Operating in the United States."
