= Malutang Dam =

- Location within China
- Country: China
- Location: Malipo County
- Coordinates: 23°01′01″N 104°44′39″E
- Status: Operational
- Construction began: 2004
- Opening date: 2009

Dam and spillways
- Type of dam: Embankment, concrete-face rock-fill
- Impounds: Panlong River
- Height: 156 m (512 ft)
- Length: 493 m (1,617 ft)
- Dam volume: 8,000,000 m^{3} (10,463,605 cu yd)
- Spillway type: Controlled chute

Reservoir
- Total capacity: 546,000,000 m^{3} (442,649 acre⋅ft)
- Catchment area: 5,878 km^{2} (2,270 sq mi)

Power Station
- Commission date: 2004-2010
- Turbines: Stage I: 2 x 50 MW Francis-type; Stage II: 3 x 100 MW Francis-type
- Installed capacity: 400 MW

The Malutang Dam is a concrete-face rock-fill dam (CFRD) on the Panlong River in Malipo County, Yunnan Province, China. The primary purpose of the dam is hydroelectric power generation and the power plant was constructed in two stages. Stage I consists of a 40 m (131 ft) tall gravity dam which diverted water through a 3,460 m (11,352 ft) long tunnel to a 100 MW above ground power station downstream. Construction on Stage I began in 2002 and the first of 50 MW Francis turbine-generators was commissioned in October 2004, the second in January 2005.

Stage II was the construction of a 156 m (512 ft) tall CFRD (Malutang Dam) 200 m (656 ft) downstream of the Stage I dam. Stage II's power station contains three 100 MW Francis turbine generators. Construction on Stage II began in August 2005 and the reservoir began to fill in October 2009. In December 2009, the first 100 MW generator was operational and the last two by May 2010. Malutang Dam's reservoir submerged the Stage I dam but the Stage II intake tower receives water for both stages, allowing Stage I to continue to operate.

== See also ==
- List of dams and reservoirs in China
- List of major power stations in Yunnan
