= Colíder Dam =

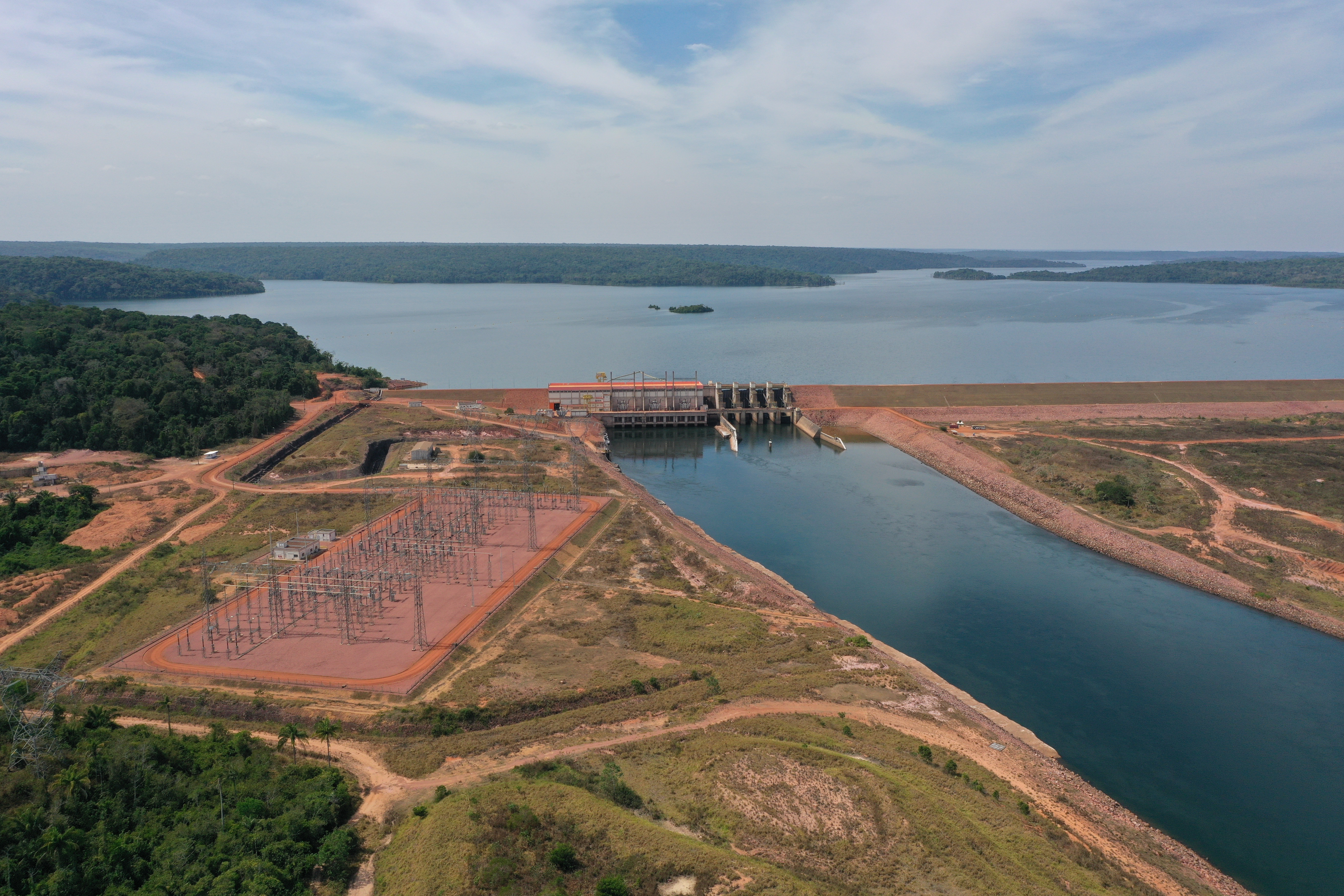
- Site of the Colíder Dam

- Location of the Colíder Dam in Brazil
- Interactive map of Colíder Dam
- Official name: Usina Hidrelétrica Colíder
- Location: Colíder, Mato Grosso, Brazil
- Coordinates: 10°59′6.60″S 55°46′30.39″W
- Purpose: Power
- Status: Operational
- Construction began: 15 May 2011
- Opening date: 2019
- Construction cost: US$1 billion
- Operator: Eletrobras

Dam and spillways
- Type of dam: Embankment, concrete gravity composite
- Impounds: Teles Pires river
- Height: 40 m (131 ft)
- Length: 1,526 m (5,007 ft)
- Dam volume: 4,961,000 m^{3} (175,196,062 ft^{3}) (concrete & earth)
- Spillway type: Overflow, 1 controlled gates
- Spillway capacity: 20,000 m^{3}/s (706,293 cu ft/s)

Reservoir
- Surface area: 182.8 km^{2} (71 mi^{2})

Power Station
- Operator: Centrais Elétricas do Brasil - Eletrobras
- Commission date: 21 December 2019
- Type: Run-of-the-river
- Hydraulic head: 15.10 m (50 ft)
- Turbines: 3 x 102.3 MW bulb turbines
- Installed capacity: 306.9 MW (max)
- Website http://www.copel.com/uhecolider/

The Colíder Dam is a rock-fill dam with an asphalt-concrete core, built from 2011 to 2019 on the Teles Pires river. It is located about 40 km (25 mi) southeast of Colíder in the state of Mato Grosso, Brazil. The dam's hydroelectric power stations have 3 turbines each 102.3 MW, resulting in a total installed capacity of 306.9 MW. Construction on the run-of-the-river type station was initiated in May 2011, and the last unit started operating in December 2019.

The dam is part of a planned six power plant "Hidrovia Tapajos/Teles Pires" project to create a navigable waterway connecting the interior of Brazil to the Atlantic Ocean. The waterway will consist of five dams on the Teles Pires river: 53 megawatts (71,000 hp) Magessi Dam, 402 megawatts (539,000 hp) Sinop Dam, 300 megawatts (400,000 hp) Colíder Dam, 1,820 megawatts (2,440,000 hp) Teles Pires Dam, 736 megawatts (987,000 hp) Sao Manoel Dam) and the 230 megawatts (310,000 hp) Foz do Apiacas Dam on the Apiacas river.

The Colíder Dam, Sinop Dam and Teles Pires Dam are built, while the smaller upstream dams are still in the planning stages by 2019.

== Design ==
The Colíder Dam will be a combination embankment dam with concrete sections for the power stations and spillway. The length of the entire dam will be 1,560 m (5,118 ft). The dam will utilize 4.7 million cubic meters of earth and 260 thousand cubic meters of concrete, and will impound a reservoir with a surface area of 182.8 square kilometers. The power plant is being constructed by the Brazilian utility Companhia Paranaense de Energia (Copel).

=== Environmental Impacts ===
To reduce emissions of methane, a powerful greenhouse gas, 82 square kilometers of vegetation were cleared before the reservoir was filled.

== See also ==
- List of power stations in Brazil
