= Colíder =

Coordinates: 10.8128°S 55.455°W

- Municipality
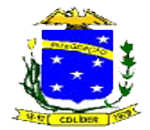
- Flag Coat of arms

- Country: Brazil
- Region: Center-West
- State: Mato Grosso
- Mesoregion: Norte Mato-Grossense

Population (2020)
  - Total: 33,649
- Time zone: UTC−3 (BRT)

Colíder is a municipality in the state of Mato Grosso in the Central-West Region of Brazil. The Colíder Dam is situated about 40 km (25 mi) southeast on the Teles Pires River.

== See also ==
- List of municipalities in Mato Grosso
