= Gelantan Dam =

- Location within China
- Interactive map of Gelantan Dam
- Official name: 戈兰滩大坝
- Country: China
- Location: Honghe/Jiangcheng
- Coordinates: 22°42′08″N 102°03′27″E
- Status: Operational
- Construction began: 2006
- Opening date: 2008
- Owners: Yunnan Datang International Lixianjiang River Basin Hydropower Development Co., Ltd.

Dam and spillways
- Type of dam: Gravity, roller-compacted concrete
- Impounds: Lixian River
- Height: 113 m (371 ft)
- Length: 466 m (1,529 ft)
- Dam volume: 1,200,000 m^{3} (1,569,541 cu yd)

Reservoir
- Total capacity: 409,000,000 m^{3} (331,582 acre⋅ft)
- Catchment area: 17,170 km^{2} (6,629 mi^{2})

Power Station
- Commission date: 2007-2008
- Turbines: 2 x 120 MW Francis-type; 1 x 150 MW Francis-type
- Installed capacity: 390 MW

The Gelantan Dam (戈兰滩大坝) is a gravity dam on the Lixian River, bordering the counties of Honghe and Jiangcheng in Yunnan Province, China. The primary purpose of the dam is hydroelectric power generation and it supports a 390 MW power station. Construction began in 2003, the river was diverted in 2006 and the first generator was commissioned in 2007, the last two in 2008. It is the sixth dam in the Lixian River cascade.

== See also ==
- List of dams and reservoirs in China
- List of major power stations in Yunnan
