= Tukahe Dam =

- Location within China
- Interactive map of Tukahe Dam
- Country: China
- Location: Luchon/Jiangcheng
- Coordinates: 22°34′21″N 102°17′37″E
- Status: Operational
- Construction began: 2003
- Opening date: 2008
- Owners: Yunnan Datang International Lixianjiang River Basin Hydropower Development Co., Ltd.

Dam and spillways
- Type of dam: Concrete gravity, roller-compacted concrete
- Impounds: Lixian River
- Height: 59.2 m (194 ft)
- Length: 300 m (984 ft)
- Dam volume: 570,000 m^{3} (745,532 cu yd)

Reservoir
- Total capacity: 88,000,000 m^{3} (71,343 acre⋅ft)
- Active capacity: 13,000,000 m^{3} (10,539 acre⋅ft)
- Normal elevation: 368 m (1,207 ft)

Power Station
- Commission date: 2008
- Hydraulic head: 31.5 m (103 ft) (max)
- Turbines: 3 x 55 MW Kaplan-type
- Installed capacity: 165 MW

The Tukahe Dam (土卡河) is a gravity dam on the Lixian River, bordering the counties of Luchun and Jiangcheng in Yunnan Province, China. The primary purpose of the dam is hydroelectric power generation and it supports a 165 MW power station. Construction began in 2003 and in 2008 the three 55 MW generators were commissioned. It is the last in a cascade of seven dams on the Lixian.

== See also ==
- List of dams and reservoirs in China
- List of major power stations in Yunnan
