= Xiaolangdi Dam =

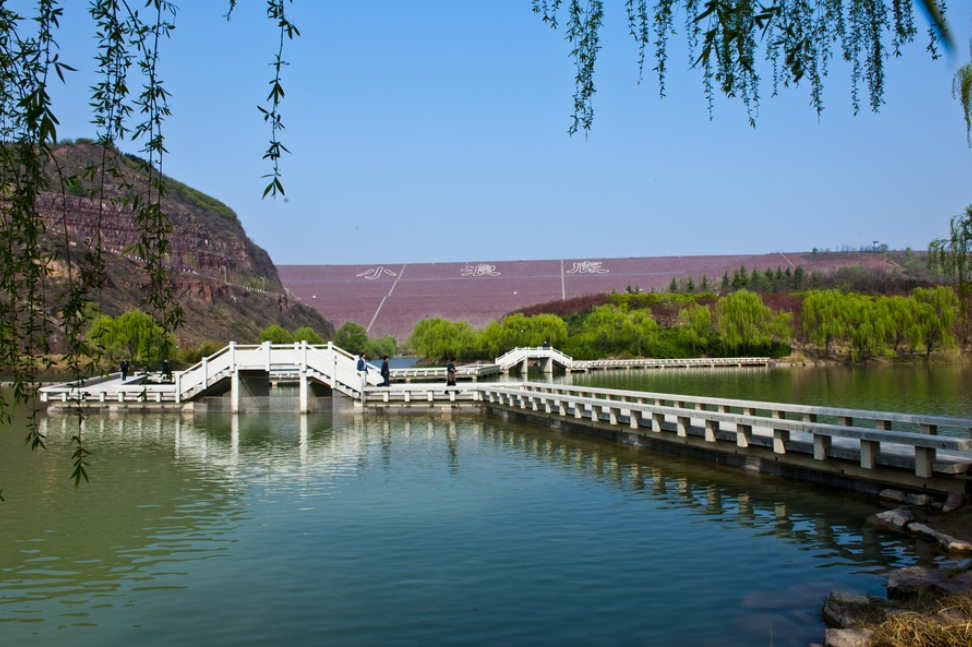

- Location within China
- Official name: 小浪底
- Country: China
- Location: Jiyuan
- Coordinates: 34°55′26″N 112°21′55″E
- Status: Operational
- Construction began: 1994
- Opening date: 2000
- Construction cost: US$3.5 billion
- Owners: Yellow River Water and Hydroelectric Power Development Corporation

Dam and spillways
- Type of dam: Embankment, rock-fill
- Impounds: Yellow River
- Height: 154 m (505 ft)
- Width (base): 1,317 m (4,321 ft)

Reservoir
- Total capacity: 12.8 km^{3} (10,377,129 acre⋅ft)
- Maximum length: 130 km (81 mi)

Power Station
- Turbines: 6 × 306 MW
- Installed capacity: 1,836 MW
- Annual generation: 5.1 TWh
- Website; Official website

The Xiaolangdi Dam (Chinese: 小浪底; pinyin: Xiǎolàngdǐ) is a dam in Jiyuan, Henan Province, China, and impounds the Yellow River. The facility is located about 20 km to the northwest of Luoyang. It has a total installed capacity of 1,836 MW and generates up to 5.1 TWh annually with the help of six 306 MW turbines. The dam stands 154 m (505 ft) tall and 1,317 m (4,321 ft) wide. It cost US$3.5 billion to construct.

== See also ==
- List of conventional hydroelectric power stations
- List of power stations in China
