= Longma Dam =

- Location within Yunnan Location within China
- Interactive map of Longma Dam
- Country: China
- Location: Mojiang Hani Autonomous County, Pu'er City, Yunnan
- Coordinates: 22.875562°N 101.647375°E
- Status: Operational
- Construction began: 2003
- Opening date: 2007
- Construction cost: US$332 million
- Owners: Yunnan Datang International Lixianjiang Hydropower Development Co., Ltd.

Dam and spillways
- Type of dam: Embankment, concrete-face rock-fill
- Impounds: Lixian River
- Height: 135 m (443 ft)
- Length: 315 m (1,033 ft)
- Elevation at crest: 643 m (2,110 ft)
- Width (crest): 10 m (33 ft)
- Dam volume: 3,670,000 m^{3} (4,800,179 cu yd)

Reservoir
- Total capacity: 590,000,000 m^{3} (478,321 acre⋅ft)

Power Station
- Commission date: 2007
- Turbines: 3 x 80 MW Francis-type
- Installed capacity: 240 MW

The Longma Dam (simplified Chinese: 龙马大坝; traditional Chinese: 龍馬大壩; pinyin: lóng mǎ dà bà) is a concrete-face rock-fill dam on the Lixian River in Mojiang Hani Autonomous County, Pu'er City, Yunnan Province, China. The primary purpose of the dam is hydroelectric power generation and it is the fourth of seven dams in the Lixian River Project. It supports a 240 MW power station. Construction on the dam began on 23 December 2003 and the reservoir began to impound 20 July 2005. In July 2007, the first generator was commissioned and the last two were in December 2007. The project was complete in June 2008 at a cost of US$332 million. The 135 m (443 ft) tall dam withholds a reservoir with a 590,000,000 m^{3} (478,321 acre⋅ft) capacity.

== See also ==
- List of dams and reservoirs in China
- List of major power stations in Yunnan
