= Ultra high voltage transmission =

Ultra high voltage transmission (UHVT) is a generic term for an overhead power line technology, which operates in excess of 1000 kV. Its main advantage is lower power loss over distance, typically only 1.5% over 500 kilometres (310 miles).

== See also ==
- Ultra-high-voltage electricity transmission in China
