= Shimenkan Dam =

- Location within China
- Interactive map of Shimenkan Dam
- Country: China
- Location: Pu'er
- Coordinates: 23.021920°N 101.502793°E
- Status: Operational
- Construction began: 2007
- Opening date: 2010
- Owners: Yunnan Datang International Lixianjiang River Basin Hydropower Development Co., Ltd.

Dam and spillways
- Type of dam: Arch
- Impounds: Lixian River
- Height: 116 m (381 ft)
- Length: 356 m (1,168 ft)
- Elevation at crest: 758 m (2,487 ft)
- Width (crest): 7 m (23 ft)

Reservoir
- Total capacity: 197,000,000 m^{3} (159,710 acre⋅ft)
- Surface area: 6.5 km^{2} (3 sq mi)
- Normal elevation: 756 m (2,480 ft)

Power Station
- Turbines: 2 x 65 MW Francis-type
- Installed capacity: 130 MW
- Annual generation: 570 GWh

The Shimenkan Dam (石门坎) is an arch dam on the Lixian River (李仙江), straddling the border between Ning'er and Mojiang County in Yunnan Province, China. The primary purpose of the dam is hydroelectric power generation and its power station has an installed capacity of 130 MW. Construction began in 2007 and the dam was complete in 2010. The dam is 116 m (381 ft) tall and creates a reservoir with a capacity of 197,000,000 m^{3} (159,710 acre⋅ft). It is the second dam in the Lixian River cascade.

== See also ==
- List of dams and reservoirs in China
- List of major power stations in Yunnan
