= Yayangshan Dam =

- Location within China
- Interactive map of Yayangshan Dam
- Official name: 崖羊山大坝
- Country: China
- Location: Pu'er City
- Coordinates: 23.101563°N 101.394732°E
- Status: Operational
- Construction began: 2003
- Opening date: 2006
- Owners: Yunnan Datang International Lixianjiang River Basin Hydropower Development Co., Ltd.

Dam and spillways
- Type of dam: Embankment, concrete-face rock-fill
- Impounds: Lixian River
- Height: 88 m (289 ft)
- Length: 236 m (774 ft)
- Dam volume: 1,380,000 m^{3} (1,804,972 cu yd)

Reservoir
- Total capacity: 247,000,000 m^{3} (200,246 acre⋅ft)
- Active capacity: 134,000,000 m^{3} (108,636 acre⋅ft)

Power Station
- Commission date: 2006
- Hydraulic head: 80 m (262 ft) (max)
- Turbines: 2 x 60 MW Francis-type
- Installed capacity: 120 MW

The Yayangshan Dam (崖羊山大坝) is a concrete-face rock-fill dam on the Lixian River, bordering the counties of Ning'er and Mojiang in Yunnan Province, China. It is located 56 km (35 mi) from Pu'er City. The primary purpose of the dam is hydroelectric power generation and it supports a 120 MW power station. Construction began in 2003, the river was diverted in 2004 and the two 60 MW generators were commissioned in 2006. It is the first dam in the Lixian River cascade.

== See also ==
- List of dams and reservoirs in China
- List of major power stations in Yunnan
