= Jufudu Dam =

- Location within China
- Interactive map of Jufudu Dam
- Country: China
- Location: Yuanjiang/Mojiang
- Coordinates: 22.902961°N 101.773283°E
- Status: Operational
- Construction began: 2004
- Opening date: 2008
- Owners: Yunnan Datang International Lixianjiang River Basin Hydropower Development Co., Ltd.

Dam and spillways
- Type of dam: Concrete gravity, roller-compacted concrete
- Impounds: Lixian River
- Height: 95 m (312 ft)
- Length: 320 m (1,050 ft)
- Elevation at crest: 525 m (1,722 ft)
- Dam volume: 800,000 m^{3} (1,046,360 cu yd)

Reservoir
- Total capacity: 174,000,000 m^{3} (141,064 acre⋅ft)
- Normal elevation: 522 m (1,713 ft)

Power Station
- Commission date: 2008
- Turbines: 3 x 95 MW
- Installed capacity: 285 MW

The Jufudu Dam (居甫渡大坝) is a gravity dam on the Lixian River, bordering the counties of Yuanjiang and Mojiang in Yunnan Province, China. It is located 56 km (35 mi) from Pu'er City. The primary purpose of the dam is hydroelectric power generation and it supports a 285 MW power station. Construction began in September 2004, and the three 95 MW generators were commissioned in December 2008. It is the fifth dam in the Lixian cascade.

== See also ==
- List of dams and reservoirs in China
- List of major power stations in Yunnan
