= Teles Pires Dam =

- Location of the Teles Pires Dam in Brazil
- Official name: Usina Hidrelétrica Teles Pires
- Location: Paranaíta, Mato Grosso and Pará, Brazil
- Coordinates: 9°20′26″S 56°46′37″W
- Construction began: July 2011
- Opening date: September 2016
- Construction cost: US$1.62 billion (R$ 3.3 billion)
- Owner: Iberdrola Neoenergia Iberdrola
- Operator: Iberdrola Neoenergia Iberdrola

Dam and spillways
- Type of dam: Gravity, composite
- Impounds: Teles Pires
- Height: 80 m (262 ft)
- Length: 860 m (2,822 ft)
- Spillway type: Gate-controlled
- Spillway capacity: 13,704 m^{3}/s (483,952 cu ft/s)

Reservoir
- Total capacity: 0.99722 km^{3} (997,220,000 m^{3})
- Surface area: 151 km^{2} (58 mi^{2})
- Maximum water depth: 6.6 m (22 ft) (average)
- Normal elevation: 220 m (722 ft)

Power Station
- Operator: ANEEL
- Hydraulic head: 54.57 m (179 ft)
- Turbines: 5 x 364 MW (488,000 hp) vertical Francis turbines
- Installed capacity: 1,820 MW (2,440,000 hp)
- Website www.neoenergia.com/section/noticias_interna_en.asp?news=10054
- River flow 2261 m3/s average

The Teles Pires Dam is a run-of-the-river hydroelectric dam on the Teles Pires River, 330 km (205 mi) upstream of the confluence with the Tapajós river, on the border of the Brazilian states of Mato Grosso and Pará. The 80-metre (260 ft) dam impounds a 150-square-kilometre (58 sq mi) reservoir (55 square kilometres (21 sq mi) original riverbed and 95 square kilometres (37 sq mi) inundated area), 84% in Mato Grosso state (Paranaíta district) and 16% in Para state (Jacareacanga district).

The dam is part of a planned six-power-plant "Hidrovia Tapajos/Teles Pires" project to create a navigable waterway connecting the interior of Brazil to the Atlantic Ocean. The waterway will consist of six dams on the Teles Pires river—the 53-megawatt (71,000 hp) Magessi Dam, 430-megawatt (580,000 hp) Sinop Dam, 342-megawatt (459,000 hp) Colider Dam, 1,820-megawatt (2,440,000 hp) Teles Pires Dam, and 746-megawatt (1,000,000 hp) Sao Manoel Dam—and the 230-megawatt (310,000 hp) Foz do Apiacas Dam on the Apiacas river. Smaller upstream dams are still in the planning stages.

== Design ==
The Teles Pires Dam is a gravity dam constructed of composite materials layered on a roller-compacted concrete core, located on the Teles Pires river 330 kilometres (210 mi) upstream of the confluence with the Tapajos river, on the border between the Brazilian states of Mato Grosso and Para.

== Impacts ==
Brazilian law requires water impoundments to undergo an approval process to ensure that each project meets environmental, social, political, and safety criteria.

=== Social ===
The most frequent objection is that the dam builders failed to adequately consult with indigenous peoples, as required by law. The Brazilian government indigenous protection foundation FUNAI predicts that there may be un-contacted indigenous populations in the region that will be affected by the dam. On March 30, 2012, a judge suspended construction of the Teles Pires Dam to preserve a waterfall that is considered sacred by an indigenous tribe.

=== Environmental ===
The Teles Pires Dam does not impound a large reservoir because it is a run-of-the-river project. The dam also feature significant environmental remediation efforts. As a consequence, there has not been strong environmental opposition to the implementation of the Teles Pires Dam. On 17 March 2015 an agreement was made to compensate the public for the irreversible negative environmental impacts of the project through payment of R$500,000 for use by the Sucunduri State Park.

== See also ==
- List of power stations in Brazil
