= Tingzikou Dam =

- Location within China
- Country: China
- Location: Cangxi County
- Coordinates: 31°49′24″N 105°52′07″E
- Status: Operational
- Construction began: 2009
- Opening date: 2013

Dam and spillways
- Type of dam: Gravity
- Impounds: Jialing River
- Height: 116 m (381 ft)

Reservoir
- Creates: Tingzikou Reservoir
- Total capacity: 4,067,000,000 m^{3} (3,297,171 acre⋅ft)

Power Station
- Commission date: 2013-2014
- Hydraulic head: 73 m (240 ft) (rated)
- Turbines: 4 x 275 MW
- Installed capacity: 1,100 MW
- Annual generation: 3.2 billion kWh (est.)

The Tingzikou Dam is a gravity dam on the Jialing River downstream of Guangyuan in Cangxi County, Sichuan province, China. The purposes of the dam is flood control, irrigation, hydroelectric power production and navigation. The dam supports a 1,100 MW power station and a 500-ton ship lift. The project was approved in October 2009 and after being shelved for 50 years. Construction began soon thereafter and the river was closed-off in January 2010. The dam began to impound its reservoir in May 2013 and the first generator went online in August. On 20 March 2014 the third generator was commissioned and the fourth and final on 29 April 2014.

== See also ==
- List of power stations in China
