= Baihetan Dam =

Hydroelectric megadam in China

- Location within China
- Interactive map of Baihetan Dam
- Official name: 白鹤滩大坝
- Construction began: 2008
- Opening date: February 2021
- Construction cost: ¥220 billion (US$31.58 billion)

Dam and spillways
- Type of dam: double-curvature arch dam
- Impounds: Jinsha River
- Height: 289 metres (948 ft)
- Width (crest): 13 metres (43 ft)
- Width (base): 72 metres (236 ft)

Reservoir
- Total capacity: 17,924,000,000 m^{3} (14,531,223 acre⋅ft)

Power Station
- Turbines: 16 × 1 GW
- Installed capacity: 16 GW (operational)
- Annual generation: 60.24 TWh

The Baihetan Dam (Note: simplified Chinese: 白鹤滩大坝; traditional Chinese: 白鶴灘大壩; pinyin: Báihètān Dàbà) is a large hydroelectric dam on the Jinsha River, an upper stretch of the Yangtze River in Sichuan and Yunnan provinces, in southwest China. The dam is a 289-meter-tall double-curvature arch dam with a crest elevation of 834 m, and a width of 72 m at the base and 13 m at the crest. It is considered to be the last large hydropower project in China after a series of projects starting with the Three Gorges Dam. It is also the second largest hydropower plant in the world. The hydropower station is equipped with 16 hydro-generating units each having a capacity of 1 gigawatt, the world's largest turbines. All hydro-generating units of the Baihetan hydropower station became fully operational on 20 December 2022.

The dam is also part of the "world's largest clean energy corridor", where it joins other mega hydropower projects like the Three Gorges Dam, Wudongde Dam, Xiluodu Dam, and Xiangjiaba Dam, all located on the same river system, to produce and transmit renewable energy from the resource-rich western region to the cities in the east. In addition to power generation, the hydropower project also provides flood control, improved navigation, and sand blocking.

== History ==
In June 1959, an on-site survey was conducted at Qiaojia by a domestic expert group and a Czechoslovak expert group and, consequently, the future site for the Baihetan Power Station was selected. However, the breaking down of relations during the Sino-Soviet split in 1962, resulted in the survey team being withdrawn. The beginning of China's "Cultural Revolution" also saw the construction plans becoming shelved for many years.

Surveying of the dam site was restarted in 1992. In 2008, the original plan for the construction of Baihetan Hydropower Station, was formally started. In December 2008, the Baihetan site began construction. The dam was originally scheduled to be constructed between 2009 and 2018. The Jinsha River became officially closed in November 2014.

On August 3, 2017, construction of the main dam was officially started. The manufacturing of the first water guiding mechanism in the Baihetan Hydro-generator units was completed in Harbin, where it both passed inspection and was awarded approval on October 27, 2018. The first 1,000 MW turbine runner was completed at Dongfang Electric's Baihetan Runner Processing Plant on January 12, 2019.

An opening ceremony took place on February 5, 2021, and storage of water behind the dam commenced on April 7 of the same year, and by April 24, the water storage elevation of the hydro plant had risen over 720 meters. On June 28, 2021, the Baihetan Dam began generating electricity, when the project's first two turbines started operating. The third turbine followed in July and the fourth in November of the same year. On 20 December 2022, the formal completion of Baihetan Hydropower Station was achieved when the final hydro-generating unit was connected to the grid and began producing power.

Experts have noted the 4-year construction period as being exceptionally fast for a project of its type.

== Power generation ==
The facility generates power by utilizing 16 turbines, each with a generating capacity of 1.0 GW, taking the generating capacity to 16,000 MW. In terms of generating capacity, it is the second largest hydroelectric power plant in the world, after the Three Gorges Dam. It is estimated to generate 62.44 terawatt-hours (TWh) annually and will save about 90 million tons of coal per year and consequently reduce annual carbon emissions by 248 million tonnes.

As of 2021, each of the 1,000 MW turbines are the biggest in the world. A turbine/generator assembly is 50 meters high and weighs 7,500 tons, and produces 24 kV.

The dam is supported by a substation in Butuo County which converts the 500 kV AC generated to 800 kV DC for long distance transmission. It is claimed to be the largest substation in the world with an area of 62 ha.

== Impact ==
The dam and reservoir have particularly affected upstream Qiaojia County, providing thousands of jobs to local residents, while also requiring resettlement of 32 villages totaling 50,178 residents. Coinciding with the dam construction, the road network was also improved.

== See also ==
- Wudongde Dam, the next dam upstream
- Xiluodu Dam, the next dam downstream
- List of power stations in China
- List of largest power stations
