= Black River (Asia) =

River in Vietnam, and in China

Coordinates: 21°13′37.05″N 105°20′51.79″E

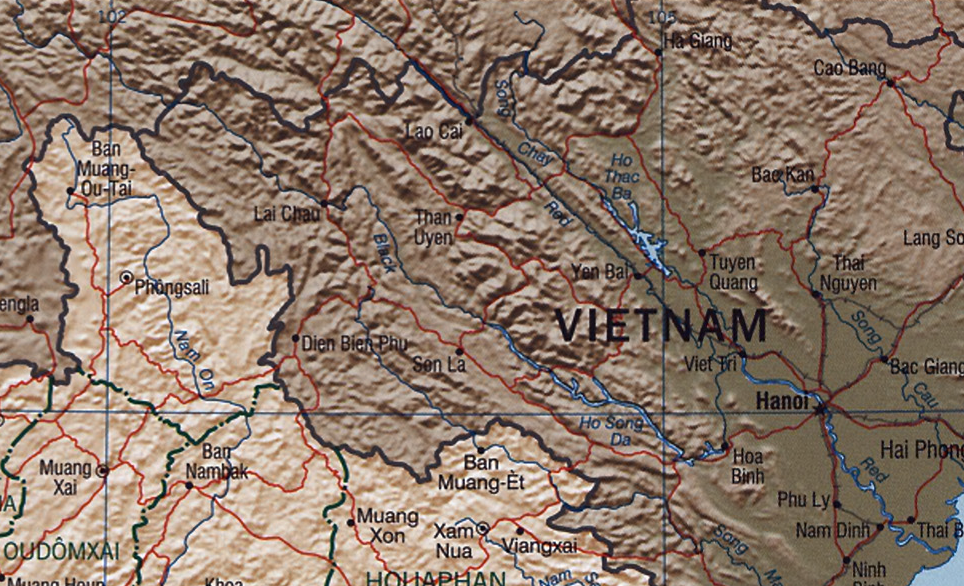
- Vietnamese: sông Đà "Da river" Chinese: 李仙江 lǐxiān jiāng "Fairy Li' river"

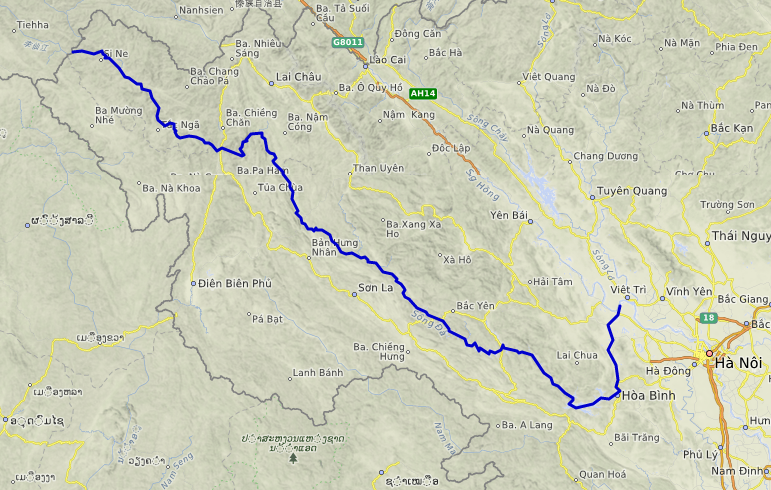

Location
- Country: Vietnam; China

Physical characteristics
- Length: 910 km (570 mi)

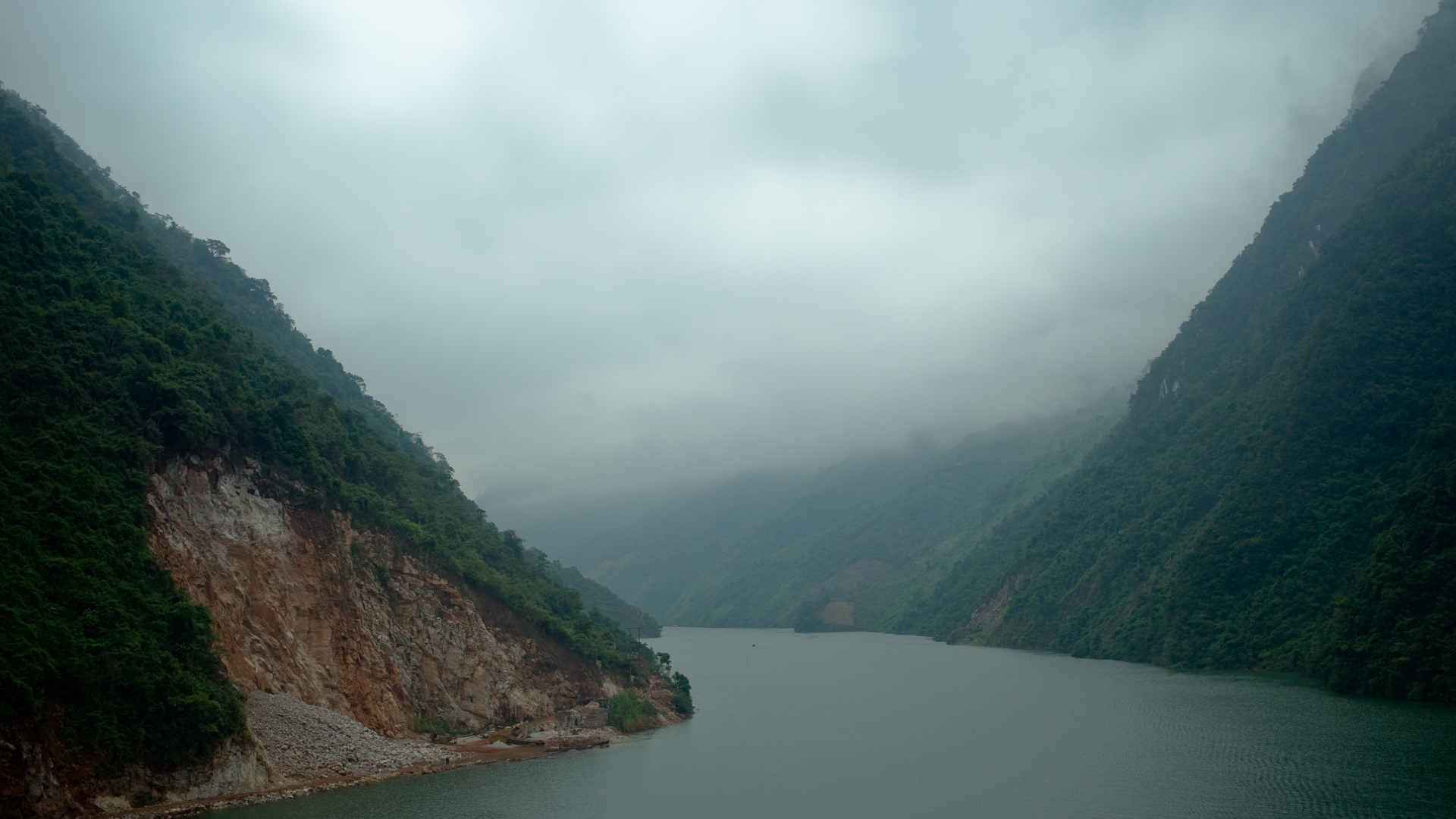
Black River near Mường Lay town

The Black River, (Vietnamese: Sông Đà, from the Tai language Da meaning "dark-brown"; chữ Hán: 瀧沱) also known upstream as the Lixian River (Chinese: 李仙江) in China, is a river located in China and northwestern Vietnam.

== Course ==
Its source is in Yunnan province of China. From China, the river's course passes through the Vietnamese provinces of Lai Châu (where it forms part of the border with Điện Biên province), Sơn La and Hòa Bình.

The Black River is the most important tributary of the Red River, which it joins in Tam Nông district near Việt Trì in Phú Thọ province. It also forms part of the border between Phú Thọ province and Hanoi (previously the border with Hà Tây province).

The river's total length is 910 km, with approximately 427 km in China and 527 km in Vietnam.

== Hydroelectric power ==
The Black River yields substantial hydroelectric power.

In China, seven dams are planned of which six, the Yayangshan Dam, Shimenkan Dam, Longma Dam, Jufudu Dam, Gelantan Dam, and Tukahe Dam, have been completed. The Xinpingzhai Dam is still in the planning stage. The total installed power capacity of this series of dams is approximately 1,300 megawatts.

In Vietnam, there are three large hydroelectric plants on the Black River. The Hòa Bình Dam was completed in 1994. The Sơn La Dam was completed in 2012 and became the largest hydroelectric producer in Southeast Asia. The Lai Châu Dam in the Mường Tè district of Lai Châu province was inaugurated on December 20, 2016. The total installed power capacity of these three dams is 5,520 megawatts.

== See also ==
- List of rivers of Vietnam
