= Panlong River =

River in Yunnan, China

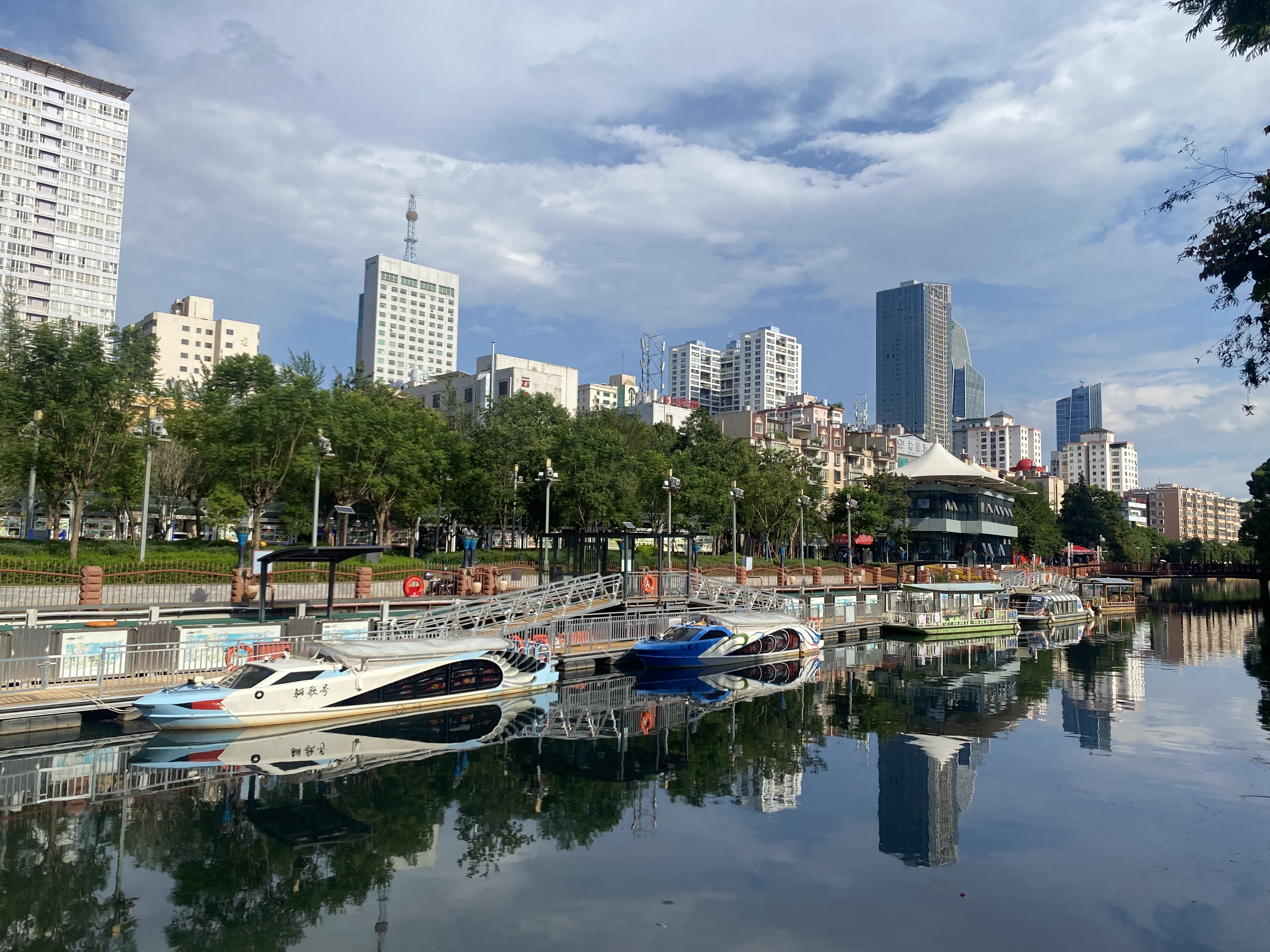
Panlong River cruise pier at Taoyuan Square

The Panlong River (Chinese: 盘龙江; pinyin: Pánlóng Jiāng) is an urban river in Kunming City, Yunnan, China. It originates at the Songhuaba Reservoir north of Kunming and acts as the city's primary waterway, flowing in a north-to-south direction through the city's four main urban districts, forming the boundary between the Panlong and Wuhua Districts in the north and the Guandu and Xishan districts in the south. It enters the Dian Lake at 24.953732°N 102.686274°E.

Although naturally formed, today the river is fully channelized and pretty much completely artificial and human-managed. After the Songhua Dam and its reservoir were constructed, the water from the upper course became managed and started to be diverted for drinking water, and due to the ever-increasing water consumption of the growing city, the reservoir's water is now rarely released into the river. Instead, the river's primary flow comes from a pipeline of water diverted from the Niulan River in Xundian County and deposited at the top of Kunming Waterfall Park, more than 2 km downstream from the dam, flowing down to create the park's artificial waterfall attraction before entering the river bed. It also receives a large quantity of municipal sewage and wastewater from industrial effluent, which once contributed enormously to the rampant pollution in Dian Lake but is now mostly treated. The river bed between Songhua Dam and the Waterfall Park remains mostly dry outside of rainy days and is overgrown with amphibious plants that consume most of the remaining water.

The Panlong River of Kunming should not be confused with another, longer, river of the exact same name (also 盘龙江), which flows through south-eastern Yunnan and Vietnam and enters the Red River.
