= Wudongde Dam =

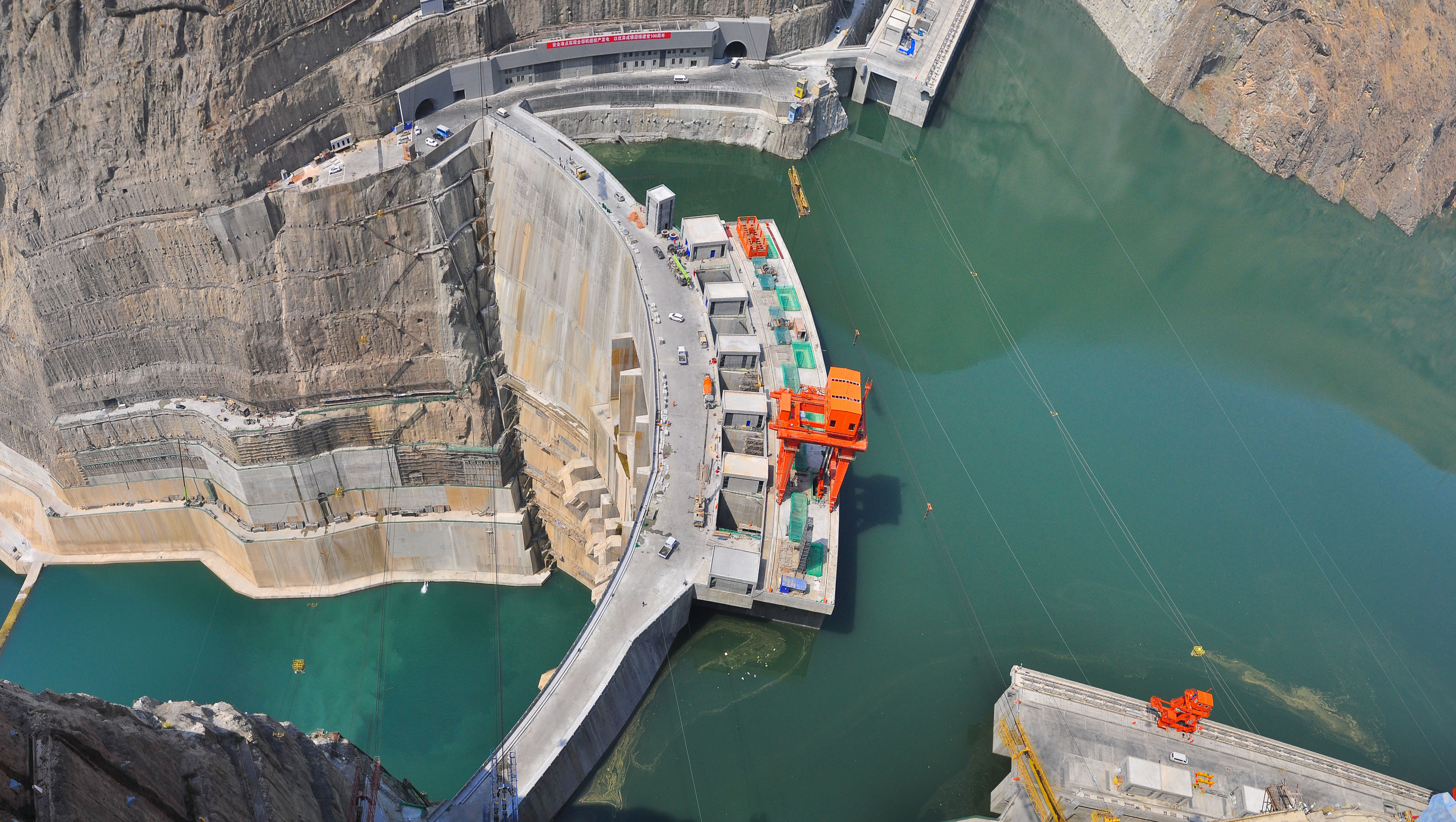
- Wudongde Dam

- Location within China
- Interactive map of Wudongde Dam
- Official name: 乌东德坝
- Location: China
- Coordinates: 26°20′02″N 102°37′48″E
- Construction began: 2015
- Opening date: June 2021
- Construction cost: CN¥120 billion (2020) (equivalent to CN¥124.27 billion or US$17.27 billion in 2024)

Dam and spillways
- Type of dam: Compound Arch
- Impounds: Jinsha River
- Height: 240 m (787 ft)

Reservoir
- Total capacity: 7,400,000,000 m^{3} (6,000,000 acre⋅ft)

Power Station
- Operator: China Three Gorges Corporation
- Commission date: 2021
- Turbines: 12 × 850 MW Francis-type
- Installed capacity: 10.2 GW
- Annual generation: 38.91 TWh

The Wudongde Dam (simplified Chinese: 乌东德坝; traditional Chinese: 烏東德壩; pinyin: Wūdōngdé Bà) is a large hydroelectric dam on the Jinsha River, an upper stretch of Yangtze River in Sichuan and Yunnan provinces in southwest China.

The design is one of the tallest in the world at 240 m (787 ft), and will generate power using 12 turbines, each with a generating capacity of 850 MW, totalling the generating capacity to 10,200 MW. Construction began in 2015, the first generator was scheduled to be commissioned in 2018 and the entire project completed in 2021. The power station is owned by China Three Gorges Corporation.

The first two turbines went online in July 2020. The station became fully operational in June 2021.

== See also ==
- List of power stations in China
