= Xiangjiaba Dam =

- Location within China
- Official name: 向家坝
- Location: Yunnan
- Coordinates: 28°38′48″N 104°23′33″E
- Status: Operational
- Construction began: November 26, 2006
- Opening date: 2012

Dam and spillways
- Type of dam: Gravity
- Impounds: Jinsha River
- Height: 161 metres (528 ft)
- Length: 909 metres (2,982 ft)

Reservoir
- Total capacity: 5,163,000,000 m^{3} (4,185,712 acre⋅ft)
- Catchment area: 458,800 km^{2} (177,144 sq mi)
- Surface area: 95.6 km^{2} (37 sq mi)

Power Station
- Operator: China Yangtze Power
- Commission date: 2012-2014
- Turbines: 4 × 812 MW, 4 × 800 MW, 3 x 450 MWMW Francis-type
- Installed capacity: 7,798 MW
- Annual generation: 30.7 TWh (2015)

The Xiangjiaba Dam (simplified Chinese: 向家坝; traditional Chinese: 向家壩; pinyin: Xiàngjiābà) is a large gravity dam on the Jinsha River, a tributary of the Yangtze River in Yunnan Province and Sichuan Province in southwest China. The facility has eleven Francis turbines, four with a capacity of 812 MW and four rated at 800 MW and three with 450 MW, totalling an installed capacity of 7,798 MW. Xiangjiaba Dam is China's fourth-biggest hydropower station following Three Gorges Dam, Baihetan Dam and Xiluodu Dam. Construction started on November 26, 2006, and its first generator was commissioned in October 2012. The last generator was commissioned on July 9, 2014.

The output of the generating station is connected to an ±800 kV HVDC link, the Xiangjiaba–Shanghai HVDC system, which transmits the power to Shanghai.

== See also ==
- List of power stations in China
