= Xiluodu Dam =

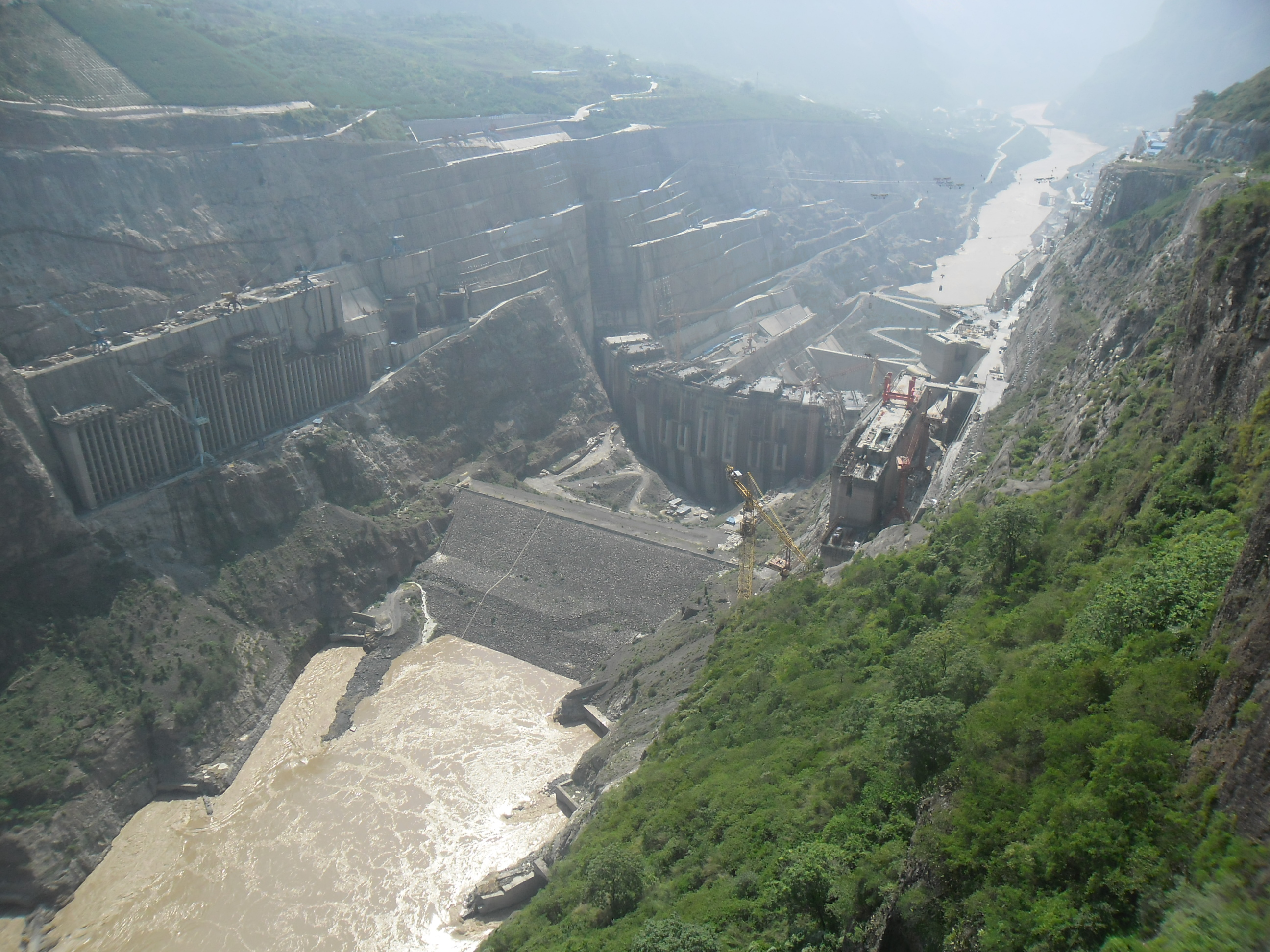

- Location within China
- Interactive map of Xiluodu Dam
- Official name: 溪洛渡大坝
- Location: Xiluodu Town, Yongshan County, Yunnan/Leibo County Sichuan, China
- Coordinates: 28°15′35.46″N 103°38′58.20″E
- Construction began: December 2005
- Opening date: July 2013
- Construction cost: US$6.2 billion

Dam and spillways
- Type of dam: Double-curvature arch, concrete
- Impounds: Jinsha River
- Height: 285.5 m (937 ft)
- Length: 700 m (2,300 ft)
- Elevation at crest: 610 m (2,000 ft)
- Spillway type: 7 × crest floodgates, 7 × orifices, 4 × tunnels
- Spillway capacity: 32,278 m^{3}/s (1,139,900 cu ft/s)

Reservoir
- Creates: Xiluodu Reservoir
- Total capacity: 12,670,000,000 cubic metres (10,270,000 acre⋅ft)
- Active capacity: 6,460,000,000 cubic metres (5,240,000 acre⋅ft)
- Catchment area: 454,400 km^{2} (175,400 mi^{2})
- Normal elevation: 600 m (2,000 ft)

Xiluodu Hydropower Station
- Operator: China Yangtze Power
- Commission date: 2013–2014
- Turbines: 18 × 770 MW Francis-type
- Installed capacity: 13,860 MW
- Annual generation: 55.2 TWh (2015)

The Xiluodu Dam (simplified Chinese: 溪洛渡大坝; traditional Chinese: 溪洛渡大壩; pinyin: Xīluòdù Dàbà) is an arch dam on the Jinsha River, i.e. the upper course of the Yangtze in China. It is located near the town of Xiluodu in Yongshan County of Yunnan Province but the dam straddles into Leibo County of Sichuan Province on the opposite side of the river. The primary purpose of the dam is hydroelectric power generation and its power station has an installed capacity of 13,860 MW. Additionally, the dam provides for flood control, silt control and its regulated water releases are intended to improve navigation downstream. Construction on the dam and power station began in 2005 and the first generator was commissioned in 2013, the last in 2014. It is operated by China Yangtze Power and is currently the fourth-largest power station in the world, as well as the fifth tallest dam world-wide.

== Location ==
The Xiluodu Dam is located on the Jinsha (Upper Yangtze) River as it exits the mountainous region of the Hengduan Mountains and Yungui Plateau and enters the Sichuan Basin. This part of the Jinsha flows between the Daliang Mountains in Sichuan on the left (northwest) bank, and the Wulian Feng in Yunnan on the right (southeast) bank. The Jinsha falls to an elevation of 400 m (1,300 ft) above sea level here while mountains rise more than 2,000 m (6,600 ft) above the Jinsha on either side.

== Background ==
Preliminary construction (roads, bridges, tunnels) for the dam began in 2003 and work on main structures officially commenced on 26 December 2005. In November 2007, the Jinsha was successfully diverted around the construction site, allowing the dam to be built. Concrete pouring began in 2008. The reservoir was impounded in May 2013 and the first of 18×770 MW Francis turbine-generators was commissioned on 15 July 2013. The fourteenth generator was commissioned in April 2014. The eighteenth and final generator was commissioned on 30 June 2014.

== Design ==
The Xiluodu is a 285.5 m (937 ft) tall and 700 m (2,300 ft) long double-curvature arch dam. It is the third tallest arch dam in the world and a key component of the Jinsha River Project. It withholds a reservoir of 12,670,000,000 cubic metres (10,270,000 acre⋅ft) of which 6,460,000,000 cubic metres (5,240,000 acre⋅ft) is considered active storage for power generation. The dam contains several spillways to include seven surface outlets, eight mid-level orifices and four spillway tunnels. All spillways afford a maximum discharge of 32,278 m^{3}/s (1,139,900 cu ft/s). The dam's power station is split into two underground power stations, one located behind the right abutment, the second behind the left abutment. Each power station contains nine 770 MW Francis turbine-generators for a total installed capacity of 13,860 MW.

== See also ==
- List of power stations in China
- List of tallest dams in the world
- List of tallest dams in China
- List of dams and reservoirs in China
- List of largest power stations in the world
