= List of power stations in Vietnam =

The following page lists some of the power stations in Vietnam.

== Coal ==
Source: Initial query Coal Tracker, updated with data from MOIT 2019 Report 58/BC-CBT, updated using press releases, updated from PDP 7A

Station	Province	Capacity (MW)	Commission date	Sponsor/owner	Status	Note	Ref
An Khanh 1 (Khanh Hoa power station)	Thai Nguyen	120 (2×60)	2015	An Khanh Electricity JSC	Operating		1208/QĐ-TTg
Cam Pha Phase I-II	Quang Ninh	680 (2×340)	2011	VINACOMIN	Operating		1208/QĐ-TTg
Cao Ngan	Thai Nguyen	115 (2×57.5)	2006	VINACOMIN	Operating		428/QĐ-TTg, BCĐQGĐ-VP
Dong Nai Formosa Unit 1–2	Dong Nai	300 (2×150)	2004	Hung Nghiep Formosa	Operating		
Dong Nai Formosa Unit 3	Dong Nai	150	2018	Hung Nghiep Formosa	Operating		428/QĐ-TTg
Duyen Hai 1	Tra Vinh	1245	2015	EVN	Operating		1208/QĐ-TTg
Duyen Hai 3	Tra Vinh	1245	2017	EVN	Operating		57/BCĐQGĐL-VP
Formosa Ha Tinh	Ha Tinh	650	2015	Hung Nghiep Formosa Ha Tinh	Operating		428/QĐ-TTg
Formosa Ha Tinh Phase 2	Ha Tinh	650	2020	Hung Nghiep Formosa Ha Tinh			
Hai Phong 1–2	Hai Phong	1200 (4×300)	2011-2014	EVNGENCO2 TPC Hai Phong	Operating		
Lee & Man	Hau Giang	125 (1×50, 1×75)	2018	Lee & Man Vietnam Paper LLC	Operating		
Mao Khe	Quang Ninh	440 (2×220)	2013	VINACOMIN	Operating		
Mong Duong 1	Quang Ninh	1120	2015	EVNGENCO3 TPC Mong Duong	Operating		1208/QĐ-TTg
Mong Duong 2	Quang Ninh	1245	2015	AES-VCM Mong Dong Power Co Ltd	Operating		
Na Duong 1	Lang Son	110 (2×55)	2005	VINACOMIN	Operating		
Nghi Son 1	Thanh Hoa	600 (2×300)	2013-2014	EVNGENCO No 1	Operating		1208/QĐ-TTg
Ninh Binh	Ninh Binh	100 (4×25)	1976	Ninh Binh Thermal Power JSC	Operating		
Nong Son 1	Quang Nam	30	2015	VINACOMIN	Operating		1208/QĐ-TTg
Pha Lai 1	Hai Duong	440 (4×110)	1986	Pha Lai Thermal Power JSC	Operating		
Pha Lai 2	Hai Duong	600 (2×300)	2001	Pha Lai Thermal Power JSC	Operating		
Quang Ninh 1–2	Quang Ninh	1200 (4×300)	2009-2014	Quang Ninh Thermal Power JSC	Operating		1208/QĐ-TTg
Son Dong	Bac Giang	220 (2×110)	2009	VINACOMIN	Operating		
Thai Binh 1	Thai Binh	600 (2×300)	2018	EVN	Operating		57/BCĐQGĐL-VP
Thang Long (Le Loi power station)	Quang Ninh	620 (2×310)	2017-2018	Hanoi Export-Import Company	Operating		57/BCĐQGĐL-VP
Uong Bi I extension	Quang Ninh	300	2009	EVNGENCO No 1	Operating		1208/QĐ-TTg
Uong Bi I	Quang Ninh	105 (1×50, 1×55)	1975-1976	EVNGENCO No 1	Operating	Retired in 2021	
Uong Bi II extension	Quang Ninh	330	2014	EVNGENCO No 1	Operating		
Vedan Vietnam Cogeneration	Dong Nai	60	2015	Vedan Vietnam JSC	Operating		EVN Annual Report 2016
Vinh Tan 1	Binh Thuan	1240 (2×620)	2018-2019	China Southern Power Grid, Vinacomin	Operating		57/BCDQGDL-VP
Vinh Tan 2	Binh Thuan	1245	2014	EVNGENCO3	Operating		1208/QĐ-TTg
Vinh Tan 4	Binh Thuan	1200 (2×600)	2017-2018	EVN	Operating		57/BCDQGDL-VP
Vung Ang 1	Ha Tinh	1200 (2×600)	2014-2015	PetroVietnam Power Corp	Operating		1208/QĐ-TTg
Duyen Hai 2	Tra Vinh	1200 (2×600)	2021	Janakuasa SDN BHD	Construction		57/BCDQGDL-VP
Duyen Hai 3 Extension	Tra Vinh	660	2019	EVN	Construction		57/BCDQGDL-VP
Hai Duong (Hai Duong BOT plant)	Hai Duong	1200 (2×600)	2020	JAKS Resources, China Power Engineering Consulting Group	Construction		57/BCDQGDL-VP
Long Phu 1	Soc Trang	1200 (2×600)	2023	PetroVietnam Power Corp	Construction		57/BCDQGDL-VP
Na Duong 2	Lang Son	110	2024	VINACOMIN	Construction		57/BCDQGDL-VP
Nghi Son 2	Thanh Hoa	1200 (2×600)	2022	Korean Electric Power Corporation and Marubeni Group	Construction		57/BCDQGDL-VP
Song Hau 1	Hau Giang	1200 (2×600)	2021	PetroVietnam Power Corp	Construction		57/BCDQGDL-VP
Thai Binh 2	Thai Binh	1200 (2×600)	2022	PetroVietnam Power Corp	Construction		57/BCDQGDL-VP
Vinh Tan 4 extension	Binh Thuan	600	2019	EVN	Construction		57/BCDQGDL-VP
Vung Ang 3	Ha Tinh	1200 (2×600)	2024-2025	Samsung Construction & Trading Corporation	Shelved		57/BCDQGDL-VP
An Khanh 2	Thai Nguyen	300 (2×150)		An Khanh Electricity JSC	Cancelled		
Bac Lieu (Cai Cung power station)	Bac Lieu	1200 (2×600)		EVN, Sojitz Kyushu Corporation	Cancelled	switch to gas	
Binh Dinh 1-2 (Than Binh Dinh power station)	Binh Dinh	2400 (2×1200)		Electricity Generating Authority of Thailand and possibly other Thai companies	Cancelled		
Cam Pha Phase III	Quang Ninh	440 (2×220)		VINACOMIN	Cancelled		
Dung Quat 1–2	Quang Ngai	1200 (2×600)		Sembcorp Utilities Vietnam	Cancelled	switch to gas	
Ganh Dau (Phu Quoc power station)	Kien Giang	200 (2×100)		VINACOMIN	Cancelled	switch to gas	
Hai Phong 3 Unit 3–4	Hai Phong	1200 (2×600)		VINACOMIN	Cancelled		
Hoa Dau Long Son	Vung Tau	225 (3×75)		Hoa Dau Son LLC	Cancelled	switch to gas	
Kien Luong 1–2	Kien Giang	2400 (4×600)		Tan Tao Energy Corp.	Cancelled		
Kien Luong 3	Kien Giang	2000 (2×1000)		Tan Tao Energy Corp.	Cancelled		
Nam Dinh 2 (Hai Hau power station)	Nam Dinh	1200 (2×600)		Taekwang Vina Industry JSC	Cancelled		
Ninh Binh II Expansion	Ninh Binh	300		Ninh Binh Thermal Power JSC	Cancelled		
Phu Tho	Phu Tho	600		EVN	Cancelled	switch to solid wastes	
Phu Yen	Phu Yen	2400 (4×600)		EVN	Cancelled	switch to gas	
Son My 1–6	Binh Thuan	3600 (6×600)		Son My Electricity Centre	Cancelled	switch to gas	
Song Hau 3	Hau Giang	2000 (2×1000)		no investor	Cancelled		
Tan Thanh	Ba Ria-Vung Tau	2400 (4×600)		J-Power	Cancelled		
Than An Giang	An Giang	2000		no investor	Cancelled		
Van Phong 2	Khanh Hoa	1320 (2×660)		Hanoi Industrial Construction and Investment, Keangnam Enterprises	Cancelled		
Cong Thanh	Thanh Hoa	600	2024	Cong Thanh Thermal Power JSC	Permitted		57/BCDQGDL-VP
Nam Dinh 1 (Hai Hau power station)	Nam Dinh	1200 (2×600)	2024-2025	Taekwang Vina Industry JSC, First National Operation & Maintenance Co. (NOMAC)	Permitted		57/BCDQGDL-VP
Quang Trach 1	Quang Binh	1200 (2×600)	2022-2023	EVN	Permitted		57/BCDQGDL-VP
Quynh Lap 1	Nghe An	1200 (2×600)	2026	VINACOMIN	Permitted		57/BCDQGDL-VP
Song Hau 2	Hau Giang	2000 (2×1000)	2024	Toyo Engineering & Construction	Permitted		57/BCDQGDL-VP
Van Phong 1	Khanh Hoa	1320 (2×660)	2023-2024	Sumitomo Corporation	Permitted		57/BCDQGDL-VP
Vung Ang 2	Ha Tinh	1200 (2×600)	2023-2024	OneEnergy Co.	Permitted		57/BCDQGDL-VP
An Khanh - Bac Giang (Luc Nam power station)	Bac Giang	650	2023	An Khanh - Bac Giang Thermoelectric JSC	Pre-permit		57/BCDQGDL-VP
Duc Giang - Lao Cai Chemical	Lao Cai	100 (2×50)	2020	Duc Giang - Lao Cai Chemicals JSC	Pre-permit		
Hai Ha CHP 1-4 (Dong Phat Hai Ha (CHP))	Quang Ninh	2100	2019-2030	Texhong Hai Ha Industrial Park Co.	Preparation		57/BCDQGDL-VP
Hai Phong 3 Unit 1–2	Hai Phong	1200 (2×600)	2028-2029	VINACOMIN	Pre-permit		57/BCDQGDL-VP
Long Phu 2	Soc Trang	1320 (2×660)	2029-2030	Tata Group	Pre-permit		57/BCDQGDL-VP
Quang Tri 1	Quang Tri	1320 (2×660)	2026-2027	EGAT International (EGATi)	Pre-permit		57/BCDQGDL-VP
Vinh Tan 3	Binh Thuan	1980 (3×660)	2024-2025	OneEnergy, EVN, and Pacific Group	Pre-permit		57/BCDQGDL-VP
Dung Quat Special Economic Zone (J-Power) Phase I-II	Quang Ngai	4400 (1×2000, 1×2400)	2028-2030	J-Power	Announced		
Long An Phase I	Long An	1200 (2×600)		no investor	Announced		57/BCDQGDL-VP
Long An Phase II	Long An	1600 (2×800)		no investor	Announced		57/BCDQGDL-VP
Long Phu 3	Soc Trang	1800 (3×600)		PVN proposed to transfer	Announced		57/BCDQGDL-VP
Quang Ninh 3	Quang Ninh	1200 (2×600)		no investor	Announced		57/BCDQGDL-VP
Quang Trach 2	Quang Binh	1200 (2×600)	2026	EVN	Announced		57/BCDQGDL-VP
Quang Tri 2	Quang Tri	1200 (2×600)	2024	Korea Western Power Co	Announced		
Quynh Lap 2	Nghe An	1200 (2×600)	2027-2028	POSCO	Announced		57/BCDQGDL-VP
Rang Dong cogeneration	Nam Dinh	100	2025		Announced		Decision 428/QD-TTg annex 1 Table 2, "Projects in operation from 2025" row 4
Tan Phuoc 1	Tien Giang	1200 (2×600)		EVN	Announced		57/BCDQGDL-VP
Tan Phuoc 2	Tien Giang	1200 (2×600)		EVN	Announced		57/BCDQGDL-VP
Thai Binh 3	Thai Binh	440		VINACOMIN	Announced		
Vung Ang 3		1200 (2×600)			Announced		Decision 428/QD-TTg: Reserve power plants for renewable energy power stations’ failure of schedule and output expected

== Gas turbines ==
Source: updated with data from Ministry of Industry and Trade (MOIT) 2019 Report 58/BC-CBT, updated with Decision 125/QD-DTDL, updated using press releases.

Station	Province	Capacity (MW)	Commission date	Sponsor/owner	Status	Note	Ref
Ca Mau 1&2 gas power plant	Ca Mau	2×750	2008	PetroVietnam Power Ca Mau	Operating		and decision 125/QD-DTDL annex 3 row 22–23
Nhon Trach 1 gas power plant	Dong Nai	450	2009	PetroVietnam Power Nhon Trach	Operating		
Nhon Trach 2 Combined Cycle Gas Turbine Plant	Dong Nai	750	2011	PetroVietnam Power Nhon Trach 2	Operating		
Phu My 2.1	Vung Tau	477	1997	Phu My Thermal Power Company, GENCO3	Operating		and Decision 125/QD-DTDL annex 1 row 15
Ba Ria	Vung Tau	340	1992-2002	Ba Ria Thermal Power Company, GENCO 3	Operating		and Decision 125/QD-DTDL annex 3 row 21
Phu My 2.1 extension	Vung Tau	468	1999	Phu My Thermal Power Company, GENCO 3	Operating		and Decision 125/QD-DTDL annex 1 row 15
Phu My 4	Vung Tau	477	2004	Phu My Thermal Power Company, GENCO 3	Operating		and Decision 125/QD-DTDL annex 1 row 16
O Mon	Can Tho	2×330	2009-2015	EVNGENCO2	Operating		
Phu My 1	Vung Tau	1118	a	Phu My Thermal Power Company, GENCO 3	Operating		and Decision 125/QD-DTDL annex 1 row 14
Phu My 3	Vung Tau	720	2004	Phu My 3 Bot Power Company LTD, BP Holdings BV (England), SempCorp Utilities company (Singapore), Kyushu and Nissho Iwai (Japan)	Operating		and Decision 125/QD-DTDL annex 3 row 18
Phu My 2.2	Vung Tau	720	2005	Mekong Energy Company LTD, Electricité De France (EDF), Sumitomo, TEPCO	Operating		and Decision 125/QD-DTDL annex 3 row 17
O Mon III Combined Cycle Gas Turbine Plant	Can Tho	1×750	2025	EVN (ODA)	Permitted/pre-permit		Report 58/BC-CBT annex row I.13
O Mon IV Combined Cycle Gas Turbine Plant	Can Tho	1×750	2023	EVN	Permitted/pre-permit		Report 58/BC-CBT annex row I.14
Dung Quat I Combined Cycle Gas Turbine Plant	Quang Ngai	750	2024	EVN	Permitted/pre-permit		Report 58/BC-CBT annex row I.19
DungQuat III Combined Cycle Gas Turbine Plant	Quang Ngai	750	2025	EVN	Permitted/pre-permit		Report 58/BC-CBT annex row I.20
Nhon Trach 3&4 Combined Cycle Gas Turbine Plant	Dong Nai	2×750	2023-2024	PVN	Permitted/pre-permit		Report 58/BC-CBT annex row II.5
Mien Trung 1,2 Combined Cycle Gas Turbine Plant	Quang Nam	2×750	2024-2025	PVN	Permitted/pre-permit		Report 58/BC-CBT annex row II.7
Long Son Petrochemical Complex (Mien Nam Petrochemical Complex)	Vung Tau	2×10	2023	SCG Group (Thailand)	Permitted/pre-permit		
Kien Giang 1&2 Combined Cycle Gas Turbine Plant	Kien Giang	2×750	After 2030	PVN	Announced		Report 58/BC-CBT annex row II.6
Son My II Combined Cycle Gas Turbine Plant	Binh Thuan	3×750	2026-2028	AES Corporation, PVGAS	Announced		Report 58/BC-CBT annex row II.8 and
Dung Quat II Combined Cycle Gas Turbine Plant	Quang Ngai	750	2026	BOT	Announced		Report 58/BC-CBT annex row IV.12
Son My Combined Cycle Gas Turbine Plant	Binh Thuan	3×750	2028-2029	Electricité De France (EDF), Kiushu, Sojitz, PAC	Announced		Report 58/BC-CBT annex row IV.15 and
O Mon II Combined Cycle Gas Turbine Plant	Can Tho	750	2026	no investor	Announced		Report 58/BC-CBT annex row VI.3
Ca Na LNG gas power plant	Ninh Thuan	4×1500	unknown	Gulf Energy Development Group (Thailand)	Announced		
Bac Lieu LNG gas power plant	Bac Lieu	3200	unknown	Delta Offshore Energy	Announced		
Phu Yen	Phu Yen			J-Power	Announced		
Long Son	Vung Tau	3×1200	2019-2025	EVNGENCO3	Announced		

Updated with data from Ministry of Industry and Trade (MOIT) 2019 Report 58/BC-CBT, updated with Decision 125/QD-DTDL, updated using press releases.

Power plants	Other names	Sponsors	Capacity (MW)	Status	Province	Commission date	Source	Note
O Mon III Combined Cycle Gas Turbine Plant		EVN (ODA)	1×750	Pre-permit/permitted	Can Tho	2025	MOIT Report 58/BC-CBT annex row I.13	
O Mon IV Combined Cycle Gas Turbine Plant		EVN	1×750	Pre-permit/permitted	Can Tho	2023	MOIT Report 58/BC-CBT annex row I.14	
Dung Quat I Combined Cycle Gas Turbine Plant		EVN	750	Pre-permit/permitted	Quang Ngai	2024	MOIT Report 58/BC-CBT annex row I.19	
Dung Quat III Combined Cycle Gas Turbine Plant		EVN	750	Pre-permit/permitted	Quang Ngai	2025	MOIT Report 58/BC-CBT annex row I.20	
Nhon Trach 3&4 Combined Cycle Gas Turbine Plant		PVN	2×750	Pre-permit/permitted	Dong Nai	2023-2024	MOIT Report 58/BC-CBT annex row II.5	
Kien Giang 1&2 Combined Cycle Gas Turbine Plant		PVN	2×750	Announced	Kien Giang	After 2030	MOIT Report 58/BC-CBT annex row II.6	
Mien Trung 1,2 Combined Cycle Gas Turbine Plant		PVN	2×750	Pre-permit/permitted	Quang Nam	2024-2025	MOIT Report 58/BC-CBT annex row II.7	
Son My II Combined Cycle Gas Turbine Plant		AES Corporation, PVGAS	3×750	Announced	Binh Thuan	2026-2028	MOIT Report 58/BC-CBT annex row II.8 and	
Dung Quat II Combined Cycle Gas Turbine Plant		BOT	750	Announced	Quang Ngai	2026	MOIT Report 58/BC-CBT annex row IV.12	
Son My Combined Cycle Gas Turbine Plant		Electricité De France (EDF), Kiushu, Sojitz, PAC	3×750	Announced	Binh Thuan	2028-2029	MOIT Report 58/BC-CBT annex row IV.15 and	
O Mon II Combined Cycle Gas Turbine Plant		no investor	750	Announced	Can Tho	2026	MOIT Report 58/BC-CBT annex row VI.3	
Ca Na LNG gas power plant		Gulf Energy Development Group (Thailand)	4×1500	Announced	Ninh Thuan	unknown		
Ca Mau 1&2 gas power plant		PetroVietnam Power Ca Mau	2×750	Operating	Ca Mau	2008	and decision 125/QD-DTDL annex 3 row 22–23	
Nhon Trach 1 gas power plant		PetroVietnam Power Nhon Trach	450	Operating	Dong Nai	2009		
Nhon Trach 2 Combined Cycle Gas Turbine Plant		PetroVietnam Power Nhon Trach 2	750	Operating	Dong Nai	2011		
Bac Lieu LNG gas power plant		Delta Offshore Energy	3200	Announced	Bac Lieu	unknown		
Phu My 2.1		Phu My Thermal Power Company, GENCO3	477	Operating	Vung Tau	1997	and Decision 125/QD-DTDL annex 1 row 15	
Ba Ria		Ba Ria Thermal Power Company, GENCO 3	340	Operating	Vung Tau	1992-2002	and Decision 125/QD-DTDL annex 3 row 21	
Phu My 2.1 extension		Phu My Thermal Power Company, GENCO 3	468	Operating	Vung Tau	1999	and Decision 125/QD-DTDL annex 1 row 15	
Phu My 4		Phu My Thermal Power Company, GENCO 3	477	Operating	Vung Tau	2004	and Decision 125/QD-DTDL annex 1 row 16	
Phu Yen		J-Power		Announced	Phu Yen			
Long Son Petrochemical Complex	Mien Nam Petrochemical Complex	SCG Group (Thailand)	2×10	permitted	Vung Tau	2023		
O Mon		EVNGENCO2	2×330	operating	Can Tho	2009-2015		
Phu My 1		Phu My Thermal Power Company, GENCO 3	1118	operating	Vung Tau	2001	and Decision 125/QD-DTDL annex 1 row 14	
Phu My 3		Phu My 3 Bot Power Company LTD, BP Holdings BV (England), SempCorp Utilities company (Singapore), Kyushu and Nissho Iwai (Japan)	720	operating	Vung Tau	2004	and Decision 125/QD-DTDL annex 3 row 18	
Phu My 2.2		Mekong Energy Company LTD, Electricité De France (EDF), Sumitomo, TEPCO	720	operating	Vung Tau	2005	and Decision 125/QD-DTDL annex 3 row 17	
Long Son		EVNGENCO3	3×1200	Announced	Vung Tau	2019-2025		

== Solar power plants ==
Source: Initial query from DEVI Renewable Energies, updated using press releases

Note: Construction start + COD date form: day/month/year

Station	Location	Province	Capacity (MW)	Capacity (MWp)	Construction start date	COD date	Sponsor/owner	Status	Note	Source
TTC Phong Dien	Dien Loc commune, Phong Dien district, TT Hue province	Thua Thien Hue	35	48	01/01/2018	25/09/2018	GEC/TTC	Operation	EPC: Sharp-SSSA-NSN partnership	
TTC Krong Pa	Krong Pa, Gia Lai	Gia Lai	49	69	03/2018	4/11/2018	GEC/TTC	Operation		
BP Solar 1 (Vietnamese power plant)	Huu Phuoc commune, Ninh Phuoc district, Ninh Thuan province	Ninh Thuan	37.5	46	06/2018	20/01/2019	Bac Phuong JSC	Operation		
Srepok 1	Ea Wer commune, Buon Don district, Dak Lak province	Dak Lak	42.1	50	19/10/2018	31/01/2019	Dai Hai Investment and Development JSC	Operation		
Long Thanh 1	Cu M'Lan commune, Ea Sup district, Dak Lak province	Dak Lak	43.8	50		05/2019	Long Thanh Infrastructure Investment and Development JS	Operation		
Quang Minh solar power	Village 9, Ea Wer commune, Buon Don district, Dak Lak	Dak Lak	40.9	50	19/10/2018	31/01/2019	Dai Hai Power + Srepok Solar	Operation		
TTC 1 solar power	Thanh Thanh Cong port warehouse in An Hoa commune, Trang Bang district, Tay Ninh	Tay Ninh	48	68.8	25/05/2018	06/03/2019	TTC Green Energy	Operation		
TTC 2 solar power	Trang Bang District, Tay Ninh Province	Tay Ninh	40.8	50	10/08/2018	19/4/2019	TTC Green Energy	Operation		
BIM 1	Phuoc Minh commune, Thuan Nam district, Ninh Thuan	Ninh Thuan	25	30	01/2018	27/03/2019	Bim Group	Operation	BIM - AC Renewable partnership	
BIM 2	Phuoc Minh commune, Thuan Nam district, Ninh Thuan	Ninh Thuan	199.3	250	01/2018	05/2019	Bim Group	Operation	Powerway Mounting structure. Sungrow Inverter. AC Energy – the subsidiaries of Ayala Corporation (Philippines) is the owner and Bouygues Energies & Services (France) is the EPC contractor. BIM - AC Renewable partnership.	
BIM 3	Phuoc Minh commune, Thuan Nam district, Ninh Thuan	Ninh Thuan	41.2	50	01/2018	05/2019	Bim Group	Operation	Powerway Mounting structure. Sungrow Inverter. AC Energy – the subsidiaries of Ayala Corporation (Philippines) is the owner and Bouygues Energies & Services (France) is the EPC contractor. BIM - AC Renewable partnership.	
Yen Dinh solar power	Yen Thai commune, Yen Dinh district, Thanh Hoa province	Thanh Hoa	30	38	10/2017	22/3/2019	Song Lam Son La Energy JSC	Operation		
Vinh Tan Power Center Phase 1	Vinh Tan commune, Tuy Phong district, Binh Thuan province	Binh Thuan	6.2		12/2018	23/01/2019	EVNPECC2	Operation		
Vinh Tan Power Center Phase 2	Vinh Tan commune, Tuy Phong district, Binh Thuan province	Binh Thuan	34.9	42.7	12/2018	22/06/2019	EVNGENCO 3	Operation		
TTC Ham Phu II	Ham Phu, Ham Thuan Bac district, Binh Thuan province	Binh Thuan	40.8	49	31/07/2018	12/04/2019	GEC/TTC	Operation		
Da Mi Floating	Tanh Linh and Ham Thuan Bac districts, Binh Thuan province	Binh Thuan	42.5	47.5	2017	13/05/2019	DHD - Da Nhim Hydropower Plant - Ham Thuan - Da Mi (EVNGENCO 1)	Operation		
Sao Mai Solar PV1 Phase 1&2	Tinh Bien district, An Giang	An Giang	174	210	02/2019	06/07/2019	Sao Mai Group	Operation		
Mui Ne	Mui Ne ward, Phan Thiet city, Binh Thuan province	Binh Thuan	32.5	40	12/10/2018	04/06/2019	Duc Thanh Mui Ne JSC (Pacifico Energy + Duc Long Gia Lai)	Operation	EPC: TTCL Vietnam LLC, Battery of Jinko Solar. TVGS is Mott Macdonald	
Hong Phong 4	Hong Phong commune, Bac Binh district, Binh Thuan province	Binh Thuan	40	48	10/2018	30/5/2019	Ha Do Group (HDG)	Operation	Sunpower panels, Inverter SMA, Transformer ABB, Tractebel: OE	
LIG Quang Tri	Gio Hai commune and Gio Thanh commune, Gio Linh district, Quang Tri	Quang Tri	40.8	49.5	10/2018	18/05/2019	LICOGI 13 JSC	Operation		
Hau Giang	Hoa An commune, Phung Hiep district, Hau Giang province	Hau Giang	29			15/12/2020	VKT Hoa An JSC	Operation		
Hong Phong 1A	Hong Phong commune, Bac Binh district, Binh Thuan province	Binh Thuan	150	195		01/06/2019	Hong Phong 1 Energy JSC	Operation	Sinohydro Corporation Limited belongs to Power Chi Group	
Hong Phong 1B	Hong Phong commune, Bac Binh district, Binh Thuan province	Binh Thuan	100	130		02/06/2019	Hong Phong 1 Energy JSC	Operation	Sinohydro Corporation Limited belongs to Power Chi Group	
Hong Liem 3	Hong Liem commune, Ham Thuan Bac district, Binh Thuan province	Binh Thuan	42			18/12/2020	Truong Loc Binh Thuan Solar Company	Operation		
Cu Jut solar power	Ea T’ling town, Cu Jut district, Dak Nong province	Dak Nong	50	62	06/2017	20/04/2019	Mien Trung Hydropower JSC (CHP)	Operation		
Nhi Ha - Thuan Nam 13	Nhi Ha commune, Thuan Nam district, Ninh Thuan province	Ninh Thuan	40	50	05/2018	20/06/2019	Solar Power Ninh Thuan One Member LLC	Operation		
CMX Renewable Energy Vietnam	Mỹ Sơn commune, Ninh Son district, Ninh Thuan province	Ninh Thuan	131.3	168	09/06/2018	18/06/2019	CMX Re Sunseap Vietnam	Operation	JV: Sunseap, InfraCo Asia and CMX Renewable Energy Canada Inc	
Thuan Nam 19	Phuoc Minh commune, Thuan Nam district, Ninh Thuan	Ninh Thuan	49	61.1	01/04/2018	24/6/2019	Tasco Energy	Operation	EPC: Risen Energy. Risen holds 70% equity	
Ninh Phuoc 6.1, 6.2	Phuoc Huu commune, Ninh Phuoc district, Ninh Thuan province	Ninh Thuan	49	58.3	12/06/2018	06/2019	NITSA (Ninh Thuan Renewable Energy & Agriculture JSC)	Operation	EPC: EVNPECC2	
Dam Tra O	My Chau commune, Phu My district, Binh Dinh province	Binh Dinh	41.7			18/12/2020	Vietnam Renewable Energy JSC	Operation		
Dohwa Le Thuy	Ngu Thuy Bac and Hung Thuy commune, Le Thuy district, Quang Binh province	Quang Binh	47.6			24/12/2020	Green Energy Dohwa Company Ltd	Operation		
Cam Hung	Cam Hung commune, Cam Xuyen district, Ha Tinh province	Ha Tinh	23.2			25/12/2020	GA POWER SOLAR PARK CAM XUYEN LTD	Operation		
Cat Hiep	Hoi Van village, Cat Hiep commune, Phu Cat district, Binh Dinh province	Binh Dinh	42	49.5	29/10/2018	06/06/2019	Truong Thanh (TTVN Group)	Operation	Powerway Mounting system. EPC: Juwi. JV: Quadran International (owned by Lucia Holding – France Republic)	
Ha Do Ninh Phuoc	Phuoc Thai commune, Ninh Phuoc district, Ninh Thuan province	Ninh Thuan	40	50		01/09/2020	Ha Do Group	Operation		
Phuoc Huu	Phuoc Huu commune, Ninh Phuoc district, Ninh Thuan	Ninh Thuan	50	65	30/06/2018	20/06/2019	Nha Trang Bay Investment JSC	Operation	Module:JA Solar, Inverter:SMA, Mounting:Schletter Solar Mounting Group, Transformers:Siemens	
Song Luy 1	Song Luy commune, Bac Binh district, Binh Thuan province	Binh Thuan	39	46.7	23/09/2018	05/2019	Binh Thuan Optoelectronics Investment JSC	Operation	Design consultant Sigma Energy (Spain) - Electrical Consultant 4 (Vietnam), Supervision Consultant Tractebel (Belgium). Equipment suppliers are ABB (Sweden), TMEIC (Japan), JA Solar (China); Contractor of construction and installation PowerChina (China) -AIT (Vietnam). The project also has credit support by SHB bank.	
SP – Infra Ninh Thuan	Phuoc Vinh commune, Ninh Phuoc district, Ninh Thuan	Ninh Thuan		50	04/2018	09/2020	Surya Prakash Energy Ltd. Vietnam	Operation		
Bau Ngu Lake	Phuoc Dinh commune, Thuan Nam district, Ninh Thuan	Ninh Thuan	37.4	45.8	31/03/2018	06/2019	Truong Thanh Investment and Construction JSC	Operation	OCA: transformer	
Gelex Ninh Thuan	Phuoc Dinh commune, Thuan Nam district, Ninh Thuan	Ninh Thuan	42	50	04/06/2018	02/07/2019	Gelex Ninh Thuan Energy JSC	Operation		
Xuan Tho 1	Xuan Tho 1 and Xuan Tho 2 communes, Song Cau town, Phu Yen province	Phu Yen	45.9	49.6	08/01/2019	27/06/2019	Phu Khanh Solar JSC	Operation		
Xuan Tho 2	Xuan Tho 1 and Xuan Tho 2 communes, Song Cau town, Phu Yen province	Phu Yen	45.9	49.6	08/01/2019	27/06/2019	Phu Khanh Solar JSC	Operation		
BCG Bang Duong/BCG-CME Long An 1	Thanh An commune, Thanh Hoa district, Long An province	Long An	31.25	40.6	16/09/2018	23/06/2019	Bamboo Capital Group	Operation		
Cam Lam VN	Cam An Bac commune, Cam Lam district - Khanh Hoa	Khanh Hoa	45	49.6		25/06/2019	Cam Lam Solar Ltd.	Operation	Equity: Golf Long Thanh	
KN Cam Lam	2 communes of Cam An Bac and Cam Phuoc Tay, Cam Lam district, Khanh Hoa	Khanh Hoa	45	49.5		25/06/2019	Cam Lam Solar Ltd.	Operation	Equity: Golf Long Thanh	
Hoa Hoi (power station)	Hoa Hoi commune, Phu Hoa district, Phu Yen province	Phu Yen	214.2	257	17/11/2018	10/06/2019	B.Grimm Phu Yen + Truong Thanh Vietnam Group JSC (TTVN)	Operation		
Truc Son	5 hamlet, Truc Son commune, Cu Jut district, Dak Nong province	Dak Nong	36.5	44.4	02/2018	14/06/2019	GEC/TTC	Operation		
Phong Phu	Phong Phu commune, Tuy Phong district, Binh Thuan province	Binh Thuan	38	42	08/2018	27/04/2019	Solarcom	Operation		
BMT Solar farm Dak Lak	Ea Phe commune, Krong Pac district, Dak Lak province	Dak Lak	25	30	10/2018	25/04/2019	AMI and AC Energy	Operation	EPC general contractor unit (cooperation between Malaysia ERS Company and Vietnam IPC Group)	
Jang Pong Solar farm Dak Lak	Ea Huar commune, Buon Don district, Dak Lak province	Dak Lak	24	30		21/11/2020	Cao Nguyen IE JSC	Operation	The plant is connected to the 35kVA grid, after going into operation, the commercial electricity supply will provide 17.5 million kWh of electricity per year.	
Mo Duc solar farm	Duc Minh commune, Mo Duc district, Quang Ngai province	Quang Ngai	19.2		08/2015	26/04/2019	Thien Tan Group	Operation	FTC Solar Tracking	
Binh Nguyen solar farm	Nam Binh village, Binh Nguyen commune, Binh Son district, Quang Ngai	Quang Ngai	40.8	49.6	20/09/2018	18/05/2019	Truong Thanh Quang Ngai High Technology and Energy JSC	Operation	General contractors are Sharp Corporation (Japan) and Hawee Construction and Industry JSC (Vietnam). Truong Thanh Quang Ngai High Technology and Energy JSC was established by Vietnam Joint Venture Group and Sermsang Power Corporation (Kingdom of Thailand).	
AMI Khanh Hoa	Cam An Nam commune, Cam Lam district, Khanh Hoa province	Khanh Hoa	47.5	49.9	24/08/2018	30/05/2019	AMI Khanh Hoa Energy JSC	Operation		
KN Van Ninh	Van Hung commune, Van Ninh district, Khanh Hoa province	Khanh Hoa	86.7	100		07/12/2020	KN Van Ninh Solar Development and Investment Company Limited	Operation		
Krong Pa 2	Chu Gu commune, Krong Pa district, Gia Lai province	Gia Lai	39	49		2019	Thanh Nguyen Development and Investment Company Limited	Operation		
Loc Ninh 1	Loc Tan commune, Loc Ninh district, Binh Phuoc province	Binh Phuoc	187.5			19/12/2020	Loc Ninh Energy JSC	Operation		
Loc Ninh 2	Loc Tan commune, Loc Ninh district, Binh Phuoc province	Binh Phuoc	187.5			19/12/2020	Loc Ninh Energy JSC	Operation		
Loc Ninh 3	Loc Tan commune, Loc Ninh district, Binh Phuoc province	Binh Phuoc	125			22/12/2020	Loc Ninh Energy JSC	Operation		
Loc Ninh 4	Loc Tan commune, Loc Ninh district, Binh Phuoc province	Binh Phuoc	162			21/12/2020	Loc Ninh 4 Energy JSC	Operation		
Loc Ninh 5	Loc Tan commune, Loc Ninh district, Binh Phuoc province	Binh Phuoc	40			21/12/2020	Loc Ninh 4 Energy JSC	Operation		
Long Son	Ninh Son commune, Ninh Hoa district, Khanh Hoa province	Khanh Hoa	140			02/12/2020	Long Son Energy JSC	Operation		
My Hiep	My Hiep commune, Phu My district, Binh Dinh province	Binh Dinh	40.8			11/12/2020	Vietnam Renewable Energy JSC	Operation		
Phu My 1	My Thang and My An commune, Phu My district, Binh Dinh province	Bình Dinh	100	144		14/12/2020	Clean Energy Vision Development JSC	Operation		
Phu My 2	My Thang and My An commune, Phu My district, Binh Dinh province	Bình Dinh	93.8	110		27/12/2020	Clean Energy Vision Development JSC	Operation		
Phu My 3	My Thang and My An commune, Phu My district, Binh Dinh province	Bình Dinh	81.3			18/12/2020	Clean Energy Vision Development JSC	Operation		
Phuoc Ninh	Phuoc Ninh and Phuoc Minh commune, Thuan Nam district, Ninh Thuan province	Ninh Thuan	36.9	45		12/06/2020	Ninh Thuan Energy Industry JSC	Operation		
Phuoc Thai 1	Phuoc Thai commune, Ninh Phuoc district, Ninh Thuan province	Ninh Thuan	42	50		04/07/2020	EVN	Operation		
Song Giang	Cam Thinh Dong and Cam Thinh Tay communes, Cam Ranh city, Khanh Hoa province	Khanh Hoa	42	50	11/2018	15/04/2019	Song Giang Solar Power JSC	Operation		
Tan Chau 1	Tan Thanh commune, Tam Chau district, Tay Ninh province	Tay Ninh	41.2	50		24/09/2020	Tan Chau Energy JSC	Operation		
Thac Mo	Thac Mo commune, Phuoc Long district, Binh Phuoc province	Binh Phuoc	40.8	50		05/12/2020	Thac Mo Hydropower JSC	Operation		
Thanh Long Phu Yen	Son Thanh Dong commune, Tay Hoa district, Phu Yen province	Phu Yen	32.8	50		02/12/2020	Thanh Long Phu Yen Solar JSC	Operation		
Thien Tan 1.2	Phuoc Ha commune, Ninh Phuoc district, Ninh Thuan province	Ninh Thuan	85.4	100		31/12/2020	Ninh Thuan Energy Industry JSC	Operation		
Thien Tan 1.3	Phuoc Vinh commune, Ninh Phuoc district, Ninh Thuan province	Ninh Thuan	43	50		28/12/2020	Ninh Thuan Energy Industry JSC	Operation		
Thien Tan Solar	Phuoc Trung commune, Bac Ai district, Ninh Thuan province	Ninh Thuan	43	50		07/03/2020	Thien Tan Group	Operation		
Thuan Nam Duc Long	Phuoc Minh commune, Thuan Nam district, Ninh Thuan province	Ninh Thuan	43	50		24/12/2019	DLG Ninh Thuan Solar JSC	Operation		
Trung Nam Thuan Nam	Phuoc Minh commune, Thuan Nam district, Ninh Thuan province	Ninh Thuan	450	630		30/09/2020	Trung Nam Thuan Nam Solar Power Company Limited	Operation		
Trung Son	Cam An Bac commune, Cam Lam district, Khanh Hoa province	Khanh Hoa	29.6	35		20/12/2020	Trung Son Energy Development JSC	Operation		
VNECO	Trung Nghia commune, Vung Liem district, Vinh Long province	Vinh Long	42	50		29/12/2020	Vneco - Vinh Long Solar Power One Member Limited Company	Operation		
Xuan Thien - Ea Sup 1	Ia Lop and Ia Rve commune, Ea Sup district, Dak Lak province	Dak Lak	600	831		08/12/2020	Xuan Thien Group	Operation		
Chu Ngoc - EVNLICOGI 16	B’Lang village, Chu Ngọc commune, Krong Pa district, Gia Lai province	Gia Lai	12.8	15	01/2019	28/05/2019	LICOGI 16 Gia Lai Renewable Energy Investment JSC	Operation		
Vinh Hao solar farm	Vinh Hao commune, Tuy Phong district, Binh Thuan province	Binh Thuan	30	34.2		16/05/2019	Vinh Hao Solar Power JSC	Operation		
Vinh Hao 4 solar farm	Vinh Hao commune, Tuy Phong district, Binh Thuan province	Binh Thuan	36.8	39		28/05/2019	Quynh Quang Real Estate Company	Operation		
Vinh Hao 6 solar farm	Vinh Hao commune, Tuy Phong district, Binh Thuan province	Binh Thuan	40.6	50	25/10/2018	18/06/2019	Vinh Hao 6 Energy JSC	Operation		
Van Giao 2 solar power	An Cu commune, Tinh Bien district, An Giang province	An Giang	40	50		16/06/2019	Van Giao Solar Energy JSC	Operation	TrinaSolar. 0.38 / 22kV pressure lifting station, 22kV medium voltage cable and working road to each solar array; operator area; 22kV distribution area, 22 / 110kV pressure lifting station. 110 kV transmission line of solar power plant Van Giao - Tinh Bien connected to Van Giao 2 solar power plant into 110 kV Tinh Bien substation. Powerchina Zhongnan Corporation Limited (China) is the EPC general contractor	
Van Giao 1 solar power	An Cu commune, Tinh Bien district, An Giang province	An Giang	40	50		17/06/2019	Van Giao Solar Energy JSC	Operation	TrinaSolar. 0.38 / 22kV pressure lifting station, 22kV medium voltage cable and working road to each solar array; operator area; 22kV distribution area, 22 / 110kV pressure lifting station. 110 kV transmission line of solar power plant Van Giao - Tinh Bien connected to Van Giao 2 solar power plant into 110 kV Tinh Bien substation. Powerchina Zhongnan Corporation Limited (China) is the EPC general contractor	
Solar Park 01	Hamlet 3, Binh Hoa Nam Commune, Duc Hue District, Long An Province	Long An	40.8	50		18/06/2019	Hoan Cau Long An	Operation		
Solar Park 02	Hamlet 3, Binh Hoa Nam Commune, Duc Hue District, Long An Province	Long An	40.8	50		19/06/2019	Vietnamsolar JSC	Operation		
Cam Hoa solar farm	Cam Hoa commune, Cam Xuyen district, Ha Tinh province	Ha Tinh	43.8	50	15/01/2019	01/07/2019	Hoanh Son Group JSC	Operation		
Eco Seido Tuy Phong	Phong Phu commune and Phu Lac commune, Tuy Phong district, Binh Thuan province	Binh Thuan	40	51	28/03/2018	12/06/2019	Green Energy LLC	Operation		
TTC Duc Hue 1	My Thanh Bac commune, Duc Hue district, Long An province	Long An	40.8	49	31/08/2018	2020	GEG/TTC	Operation		
Trung Nam Ninh Thuan solar power	Bac Phong commune and Loi Hai commune, Thuan Bac district, Ninh Thuan province	Ninh Thuan	204	258	07/07/2018	13/04/2019	Trung Nam JSC	Operation	Siemens Inverter	
Da Bac solar power	Da Bac Industrial Area, Da Bac Commune, Chau Duc District, Ba Ria Vung Tau Province	Ba Ria-Vung Tau	48	61	12/2018	14/05/2019	Dong A JSC	Operation		
Da Bac 2 solar power	Da Bac Industrial Area, Da Bac Commune, Chau Duc District, Ba Ria Vung Tau Province	Ba Ria-Vung Tau	48	61	12/2018	01/05/2019	Tai Tien Limited Liability Company	Operation		
Da Bac 3 solar power	Da Bac Industrial Area, Da Bac Commune, Chau Duc District, Ba Ria Vung Tau Province	Ba Ria-Vung Tau	42	50	12/2018	8/5/2019	Green HC Limited Liability Company	Operation		
Da Bac 4 solar power	Da Bac Industrial Area, Da Bac Commune, Chau Duc District, Ba Ria Vung Tau Province	Ba Ria-Vung Tau	42	50	12/2018	11/6/2019	Dong A Chau Duc JSC	Operation		
Dau Tieng 1, 2	Duong Minh Chau and Tan Chau districts, Tay Ninh province	Tay Ninh	350	420	23/06/2018	2019	B. Grimm Power + Xuan Cau LLC	Operation	EPC:Power Huadong Engineering, PCC1 and PECC2: Substation	
Dau Tieng 3	Duong Minh Chau and Tan Chau districts, Tay Ninh province	Tay Ninh	60	72	23/06/2018	2019	B. Grimm Power + Xuan Cau LLC	Operation	EPC:Power Huadong Engineering, PCC1 and PECC2: Substation	
VSP Binh Thuan II	Vinh Hao, Tuy Phong, Binh Thuan	Binh Thuan	26.5	33.1		2019	VSP Binh Thuan JSC	Operation		
Binh Hoa	Binh Hoa commune, Chau Thanh district, An Giang province	An Giang	10	12		22/06/2019	Pacific Energy Network Viet Nam Company Limited	Operation		
Dien Luc Mien Trung	Cam An Bac commune, Cam Lam district, Khanh Hoa province	Khanh Hoa	50			14/06/2019	EVNCPC	Operation		
Ham Kiem	Ham Kiem commune, Ham Thuan Nam district, Binh Thuan province	Binh Thuan	45	49		16/05/2019	Truong Thanh Binh Thuan Solar JSC	Operation		
KCN Chau Duc	Nghia Thanh commune, Chau Duc district, Ba Ria - Vung Tau province	Ba Ria - Vung Tau	58	70		29/05/2019	Hoang Viet Hung Company Limited	Operation		
Thuan Minh 2	Thuan Minh commune, Ham Thuan district, Binh Thuan province	Binh Thuan	42.5	50		20/06/2019	TRUONG THANH CONSTRUCTION JOINT STOCK COMPANY	Operation		
Thinh Long - AAA Phu Yen	Son Thanh Dong commune, Tay Hoa district, Phu Yen province	Phu Yen	43.8	50		22/06/2019	Thinh Long Phu Yen Solar JSC	Operation		
Tuan An	Cam Thinh Tay commune, Cam Ranh district, Khanh Hoa province	Khanh Hoa	10	11.7		01/06/2019	Tuan An Solar JSC	Operation		
Phong Dien 2	Luong Mai village, Phong Chuong commune, Phong Dien district, Thua Thien Hue province	Thua Thien Hue	40	50		10/12/2020	Doan Son Thuy JSC	Operation		
Fujiwara Binh Dinh	Nhon Hoi Economic Zone, Quy Nhon City, Binh Dinh Province	Binh Dinh	40	50	04/2018	20/06/2019	Fujiwara Binh Dinh Ltd.	Operation		
My Son solar power	Mỹ Sơn commune, Ninh Son district, Ninh Thuan	Ninh Thuan	50	62	27/06/2019	2020	My Son 1 Solar Power JSC	Operation	EPC: LICOGI 16	
My Son solar power	Mỹ Sơn, Ninh Son district, Ninh Thuan	Ninh Thuan	40	50	27/06/2019	2020	My Son 2 Solar Power JSC	Operation	EPC: LICOGI 16	
Sinenergy Ninh Thuan 1	Tan Duc village, Phuoc Huu commune, Ninh Phuoc district, Ninh Thuan province	Ninh Thuan	42.5	50	10/12/2018	16/10/2019	Sinenergy Holdings Singapore	Operation		
Hacom Solar	Phuoc Minh commune, Thuan Nam district, Ninh Thuan	Ninh Thuan	46	50	08/04/2019	25/10/2019	Hacom Holdings	Operation	EPC: Sharp Solar Solution Asia partnership	
Tuy Phong	Vinh Hao commune, Tuy Phong district, Binh Thuan province	Binh Thuan	30	39	19/09/2018	25/06/2019	Power Plus Vietnam LLC	Operation		
EuroPlast Long An	My Thanh Bac commune, Duc Hue district, Long An province	Long An	40.8	50	21/09/2018	30/05/2019	Europlast Long An JSC	Operation		
EuroPlast Phu Yen	Hoa Quang Nam and Hoa Hoi communes, Phu Hoa district, Phu Yen province	Phu Yen	40.6	50	11/2018	21/06/2019	Europlast Phu Yen JSC	Operation		
Solar Park 03, Solar Park 04 (Long An)	Hamlet 3, Binh Hoa Nam Commune, Duc Hue District, Long An Province	Long An	83	100		7/2020	Long An Solar Park JSC	Operation		
Bach Khoa A Chau 1	Hamlet 5, Suoi Day Commune, Tan Chau District, Tay Ninh Province	Tay Ninh	24.2	30		13/05/2019	Tay Ninh Bach Khoa A Chau JSC	Operation		
Tri Viet 1	Hamlet 5, Suoi Day Commune, Tan Chau District, Tay Ninh Province	Tay Ninh	24.2	30		20/05/2019	Tri Viet Tay Ninh JSC	Operation		
HCG	Tien Thuan and Loi Thuan communes, Ben Cau district, Tay Ninh province	Tay Ninh	40	50	11/2018	23/05/2019	Hoang Thai Gia Trust and Investment Management LLC, HCG Tay Ninh solar power JSC	Operation	This project was initiated and developed by Hai Dang JSC and is invested by Reonyuan Power Singapore	
HTG	Tien Thuan and Loi Thuan communes, Ben Cau district, Tay Ninh province	Tay Ninh	40	50	11/2018	24/05/2019	Hoang Thai Gia Trust and Investment Management LLC, HCG Tay Ninh solar power JSC	Operation	This project was initiated and developed by Hai Dang JSC and is invested by Reonyuan Power Singapore	
Phan Lam 1 solar power	Phan Lam commune, Bac Binh district, Binh Thuan province	Binh Thuan	30	36.7	11/01/2019	17/06/2019	Nam Viet Phan Lam Company is a joint venture with Thailand's Super Energy Corporation	Operation		
Phan Lam 2 solar power	Phan Lam commune, Bac Binh district, Binh Thuan province	Binh Thuan		49	10/2018	12/14/2020	Phan Lam Energy LLC	Operation		
Gio Thanh 1,2	Gio Thanh and Gio Hai communes, Gio Linh district, Quang Tri	Quang Tri	83.5	100	26/06/2019	28/11/2020	Gio Thanh Energy JSC, Seco JSC	Operation	Gio Thanh 1 and 2 solar power plants will install approximately 3,000 battery panels, 20 stations with inverter and medium voltage transformer, connected by 110kV voltage to Quan Ngang 110kV substation and expected to complete finished after 6 months of construction.	
Thuan Nam 12	Phuoc Ha commune, Thuan Nam district, Ninh Thuan province	Ninh Thuan	46	50		07/08/2020	Thanh Vinh Solar JSC	Operation		
Thuan Nam 19	Phuoc Minh commune, Thuan Nam district, Ninh Thuan province	Ninh Thuan	49	60		24/06/2020	Tasco Energy JSC	Operation	Annex 2, 4614/BCT-DL	
Nui Mot Lake solar power plant	Phuoc Dinh commune, Thuan Nam district, Ninh Thuan province	Ninh Thuan	42.5	71		05/12/2020	Truong Thanh Construction And Development Investment JSC	Operation		
Trung Nam Tra Vinh solar power	Dan Thanh commune, Duyen Hai town, Tra Vinh province	Tra Vinh	140.8	165	19/01/2019	20/06/2019	Trungnam Tra Vinh Solar Power	Operation		
Binh An	Binh An commune, Bac Binh district, Binh Thuan province	Binh Thuan	42.5	50		19/06/2019	Everich Binh Thuan Energy LLC	Operation		
Se San 4	Se San river, Ia O commune, Ia Grai district, Gia Lai province	Gia Lai	40.6	49		01/12/2019	EVNPMB2	Operation	EVN signs 24.2 million EUR loan agreement for the 49 MW Se San 4 solar project with AFD.	
Bau Zon	Phuoc Huu commune, Ninh Phuoc district, Ninh Thuan province	Ninh Thuan	20			05/08/2020	Sunglim.tt Solar Power Company Limited	Operation		
Nhon Hai Solar Farm	Khanh Phuoc hamlet, Nhon Hai commune, Ninh Hai district, Ninh Thuan province	Ninh Thuan	28	35	07/2019	27/06/2020	Licogi 16 Ninh Thuan RE JSC	Operation	free land use, NOT allowed to transfer to other investor	
Hong Phong 5.2	In Hong Phong commune, Bac Binh district, Binh Thuan province, Binh Thuan province	Binh Thuan	38.4	48		26/12/2020	Thien Nien Ky Energy JSC	Operation		
Phuoc Huu - Dien luc 1	Phuoc Huu commune, Ninh Phuoc district, Ninh Thuan	Ninh Thuan	28.1	30.2	07/2018	09/05/2019	Phuoc Huu Power JSC	Operation		
My Son - Hoan Loc Viet	My Son commune, Ninh Son district, Ninh Thuan	Ninh Thuan	37.5	50	01/07/2018	13/06/2019	My Son - Hoan Loc Viet Solar JSC	Operation		
Adani Phuoc Minh	Phuoc Minh commune and Phuoc Ninh commune, Thuan Nam district, Ninh Thuan	Ninh Thuan	38	50	01/10/2018	01/12/2019	Adani Phuoc Minh Ltd.	Operation		
Xuan Thien Thuan Bac - 1	Bac Phong commune, Thuan Bac district, Ninh Thuan	Ninh Thuan	125		01/09/2018	02/04/2020	Xuan Thien Ninh Thuan JSC	Operation		
Xuan Thien Thuan Bac - 2	Bac Phong commune, Thuan Bac district, Ninh Thuan	Ninh Thuan	75		01/09/2018	31/03/2020	Xuan Thien Ninh Thuan JSC	Operation		
Gia Hoet 1	Gia Hoet 1 lake, Chau Duc district, Ba Ria - Vung Tau province	Ba Ria - Vung Tau	27.5	35		10/12/2020	DTD Natural Energy Investment LLC	Operation		
Tam Bo	Tam Bo lake, Chau Duc district, Ba Ria - Vung Tau province	Ba Ria - Vung Tau	27.5	35		10/12/2020	Energy Development LLC	Operation		
Sơn My 3.1	Son My commune, Ham Tan district, Binh Thuan province	Binh Thuan	43	50		05/12/2019	Son My Renewable Energy JSC, EVNPECC2	Operation		
GAIA	Thanh An commune, Thanh Hoa district, Long An province	Long An	75				BCG Bang Duong & Hanwha Energy JSC	Implementation		
Xuan Thien - Ea Sup 2	Ia Lop and Ia Rve commune, Ea Sup district, Dak Lak province	Dak Lak	683	843			Xuan Thien Group	Implementation		
Xuan Thien - Ea Sup 3	Ia Lop and Ia Rve commune, Ea Sup district, Dak Lak province	Dak Lak	683	843			Xuan Thien Group	Implementation		
Xuan Thien - Ea Sup 4	Ia Lop and Ia Rve commune, Ea Sup district, Dak Lak province	Dak Lak	1400				Xuan Thien Group	Implementation		
Xuan Thien - Ea Sup 5	Ia Lop and Ia Rve commune, Ea Sup district, Dak Lak province	Dak Lak	600	831			Xuan Thien Group	Implementation		
Phuoc Trung solar power project	Ninh Thuan	Ninh Thuan	40	50				Preparation		
Ngoc Lac	Kien Tho commune, Ngoc Lac district, Thanh Hoa province	Thanh Hoa	36				Hoang Son JSC	Preparation		
An Cu (An Giang) solar power project	An Giang	An Giang	40	50				Preparation		
Phong Hoa solar power project	Thua Thien Hue	Thua Thien Hue	40	50				Preparation		
Ia Rsuom - Bitexco - To Na solar power project	Gia Lai	Gia Lai	12	15			Bitexco Group (Solar Power Ninh Thuan LLC)	Preparation		
MT 1, MT 2 solar power project	Loc Thanh commune, Loc Ninh district, Binh Phuoc province	Binh Phuoc	48	60				Preparation		
Loc Thach 1-1 solar power project	Loc Thanh commune, Loc Ninh district, Binh Phuoc province	Binh Phuoc	40	50				Preparation		
TTC Duc Hue 2	Duc Hue district, Long An province	Long An	40	49			GEG/TTC	Preparation		

== Wind power plants ==
Source: Initial query from DEVI Renewable Energies, 795/TTG-CN

Note: Construction start + COD date form: day/month/year

Station	Location	Province	Capacity (MW)	Construction start date	COD date	Sponsor/owner	Status	Note	Source
Tuy Phong Phase 1	Tuy Phong district, Binh Thuan province	Binh Thuan	30	2008	05/2011	REVN - Vietnam Renewable Energy JSC	Operation	Fuhrländer turbines	
Phu Lac wind farm	Phu Lac commune, Tuy Phong district, Binh Thuan province	Binh Thuan	24	27/07/2015	19/09/2016	EVN - Thuan Binh Wind Power	Operation	funded by KfW, 12×2MW Vestas turbines	
Mui Dinh	Phuoc Dinh commune, Thuan Nam district, Ninh Thuan province	Ninh Thuan	37.6	08/2016	01/2019	EAB - Germany	Operation	Enercon turbines E-103 EP02 2.35MW. First turbine erected in August/2018	
Dong Hai 1	Long Dien Dong, Dong Hai district, Bac Lieu province	Bac Lieu	50	16/04/2019		Bac Phuong Energy JSC	Operation	12 turbines; 22/110kV booster lift station - 1×63MVA; The 110kV line connects the plant with Hoa Binh - Dong Hai 110kV line	
Phu Quy	Phu Quy island district, Binh Thuan province	Binh Thuan	6	26/11/2010	12/2012	PV Power	Operation	Vestas turbines 3×2MW	
Bac Lieu (phase I, II) (VN version)	Vinh Trach Dong commune, Bac Lieu city	Bac Lieu	99.2	09/2010	01/2016	Construction-Trade-Tourism Ltd.	Operation	62 x 16 GE (1.6-82.5) turbines	
Dam Nai (phase I) (VN version)	Bac Son commune, Thuan Bac district, Ninh Thuan	Ninh Thuan	7.8	01/04/2017	22/09/2017	Blue Circle +TSV Vietnam	Operation	16× 2,625 MW Gamesa turbines.Phase 1: TC 22kV Ninh Hai station	
Dam Nai (phase II) (VN version)	Bac Son commune, Thuan Bac district, Ninh Thuan	Ninh Thuan	30	20/01/2018	08/09/2018	Blue Circle +TSV Vietnam	Operation	Phase 2: transit 110kV Thap Cham - Ninh Hai (AC300, 0.9 km)	
Huong Linh 1	Huong Hoa district, Quang Tri province	Quang Tri	30		14/03/2020	Tan Hoan Cau Group	Operation		
Huong Linh 2	Huong Hoa district, Quang Tri province	Quang Tri	30		30/04/2017	Tan Hoan Cau Group	Operation	15×2 MW Vestas turbines	
Trung Nam Ninh Thuan phase 1	Loi Hai and Bac Phong communes, Thuan Bac district, Ninh Thuan province	Ninh Thuan	39.95	26/08/2016	27/04/2019	Trungnam Wind Power JSC	Operation	ENERCON turbines, Siemens Inverter	
Trung Nam Ninh Thuan phase 2	Loi Hai and Bac Phong communes, Thuan Bac district, Ninh Thuan province	Ninh Thuan	64		04/2020	Trungnam Wind Power JSC	Operation	ENERCON turbines, Siemens Inverter	
Trung Nam Ninh Thuan phase 3	Loi Hai and Bac Phong communes, Thuan Bac district, Ninh Thuan province	Ninh Thuan	48		04/2020	Trungnam Wind Power JSC	Operation	ENERCON turbines, Siemens Inverter	
Dai Phong wind farm	Thien Nghiep commune, Mui Ne ward, Phan Thiet city	Binh Thuan	40		23/07/2020	Dai Phong Development Investment JSC	Operation	AC Energy accounts for over 62% of the economic ownership including its 50% direct voting stake. Project completion of the first phase is expected in the First Half of 2020, in time for the new wind feed-in-tariff deadline of November 2021.	
HBRE Tay Nguyen phase 1	Ea H'Leo district, Dak Lak province	Dak Lak	28.8		31/12/2019	HBRE Wind Power Solution	Operation		
Phuong Mai 3	Quy Nhon district, Binh Dinh province	Binh Dinh	20.8		01/10/2020	Central Wind JSC	Operation		
Bac Lieu phase III	Vinh Trach Dong commune, Bac Lieu city	Bac Lieu	142	30/01/2018		Super Wind Energy Cong Ly 1 JSC	Implementation	Super Wind Energy Cong Ly 1 JSC = Cong Ly + Thai Investor	
Lac Hoa 1	Lac Hoa commune, Vinh Chau district, Soc Trang	Soc Trang	30			Vinh Chau - TDC Renewable Energy JSC	Implementation		
Lac Hoa 2	Lac Hoa commune, Vinh Chau district, Soc Trang	Soc Trang	130			Lac Hoa 2 Wind Power JSC	Implementation		
Lien Lap	Tan Lien and Tan Lap commune, Huong Hoa district, Quang Tri province	Quang Tri	48			Lien Lap Wind Power JSC	Implementation		
Loi Hai 2	Loi Hai commune, Thuan Bac district, Ninh Thuan province	Ninh Thuan	28.9			Thuan Binh Wind Power JSC	Implementation		
Nam Binh 1	Dak Song district, Dak Nong province	Dak Nong	30				Implementation		
Nhon Hoa 1	Ia Phang and Nhon Hoa commune, Chu Puh district, Gia Lai province	Gia Lai	100			Nhon Hoa 1 Wind Power JSC	Implementation		
Nhon Hoa 2	Ia Phang and Nhon Hoa commune, Chu Puh district, Gia Lai province	Gia Lai	100			Nhon Hoa 2 Wind Power JSC	Implementation		
Phat trien mien nui	Chu Prong district, Gia Lai province	Gia Lai	50			Chu Prong Gia Lai Wind Power JSC	Implementation		
Phong Huy	Tan Thanh and Huong Tan commune, Huong Hoa district, Quang Tri province	Quang Tri	48			Phong Huy Wind Power JSC	Implementation		
Phong Lieu	Huong Linh and Tan Thanh and Huong Tan commune, Huong Hoa district, Quang Tri province	Quang Tri	48			Phong Lieu Wind Power JSC	Implementation		
Phong Nguyen	Tan Thanh and Huong Tan commune, Huong Hoa district, Quang Tri province	Quang Tri	48			Phong Nguyen Wind Power JSC	Implementation		
Phu Lac phase 2	Phu Lac commune, Tuy Phong district, BInh Thuan province	Binh Thuan	25.2			Thuan Binh Wind Power JSC	Implementation		
Cong Ly (3 phase) (VN version)	Lai Hoa commune, Vinh Chau district, Soc Trang	Soc Trang	90	30/01/2018		Super Wind Energy Cong Ly 1 JSC	Implementation	15×2MW per unit.	
Hoa Dong	Hoa Dong Commune, Vinh Chau District, Soc Trang	Soc Trang	30			Hoa Dong Wind Power Ltd	Implementation		
Hoa Dong 2	Hoa Dong Commune, Vinh Chau District, Soc Trang	Soc Trang	72			Hoa Dong Wind Power Ltd	Implementation		
Hoa Binh 1	Vinh Hau Commune, Hoa Binh District, Bac Lieu Province	Bac Lieu	50	01/06/2019		Hoa Binh 1 Wind Power Investment JSC	Implementation		
Hoa Binh 1 phase 2	Vinh Hau Commune, Hoa Binh District, Bac Lieu Province	Bac Lieu	50			Hoa Binh 1 Wind Power Investment JSC	Implementation		
Hoa Binh 2	Vinh Hau Commune, Hoa Binh District, Bac Lieu Province	Bac Lieu	50			Hoa Binh 2 Investment JSC	Implementation		
Hoa Thang 2.2	Hoa Thang commune, Bac Binh district, Binh Thuan province	Binh Thuan	19.8			Win Energy JSC	Implementation		
Hoang Hai	Huc commune, Huong Hoa district, Quang Tri province	Quang Tri	50			Hoang Hai Quang Tri Energy Investment JSC	Implementation		
Cau Dat	Xuan Truong and Tram Hanh communes, Da Lat city	Lam Dong	50	21/03/2019		Dai Duong RE JSC	Implementation		
Dong Hai 1 (V1-7)	Dong Hai commune, Duyen Hai district, Tra Vinh province	Tra Vinh	100			Trung Nam Tra Vinh 1 Wind Power JSC	Implementation		
Dong Hai 1 phase 2	Long Dien Dong commune, Dong Hai district, Bac Lieu province	Bac Lieu	50			Bac Phuong Energy JSC	Implementation		
Ea Nam	Dlie Yang commune, Ea H'leo district, Dak Lak province	Dak Lak	400			Trung Nam Dak Lak 1 Wind Power JSC	Implementation		
Ham Cuong 2	Ham Cuong commune, Ham Thuan Nam district, Binh Thuan province	Binh Thuan	20			HD Investment JSC	Implementation		
Han Quoc Tra Vinh	Truong Long Hoa commune, Duyen Hai district, Tra Vinh province	Tra Vinh	48			Tra Vinh 1 Wind Power JSC	Implementation		
HBRE Chu Prong phase 1	Ia Bang and Ia Phin commune, Chu Prong district, Gia Lai province	Gia Lai	50			HBRE Gia Lai Wind Power JSC	Implementation		
HBRE Ha Tinh	Ky Anh district, Ha Tinh province	Ha Tinh	120			HBRE Wind Power Solution	Implementation		
Hong Phong 1	Hong Phong commune, Bac Binh district, Binh Thuan province	Binh Thuan	40			Hong Phong 1 Wind Power JSC	Implementation		
Hung Hai Gia Lai	Krong Cho district, Gia Lai province	Gia Lai	100				Implementation		
Huong Linh 4	Huong Linh commune, Huong Hoa district, Quang Tri province	Quang Tri	30			Huong Linh 4 Wind Power JSC	Implementation		
Huong Linh 5	Huong Linh commune, Huong Hoa district, Quang Tri province	Quang Tri	30				Implementation		
Huong Linh 7	Huong Linh commune, Huong Hoa district, Quang Tri province	Quang Tri	30			Huong Linh 7 Wind Power JSC	Implementation		
Huong Linh 8	Huong Linh commune, Huong Hoa district, Quang Tri province	Quang Tri	25.2			Huong Linh 7 Wind Power JSC	Implementation		
Ia Bang 1	Ia Bang commune, Chu Prong district, Gia Lai province	Gia Lai	50			Ia Bang Wind Power JSC	Implementation		
Ia Le 1	Ia Le commune, Chu Puh district, Gia Lai province	Gia Lai	100			Cao Nguyen 1 Investment and Development JSC	Implementation		
Ia Pech	Ia Grai district, Gia Lai province	Gia Lai	50			Dien Xanh Gia Lai Investment Energy JSC	Implementation		
Ia Pech 2	Ia Grai district, Gia Lai province	Gia Lai	50			Dien Xanh Gia Lai Investment Energy JSC	Implementation		
Ia Pet Dak Doa 1	Ia Pet commune, Dak Doa district, Gia Lai province	Gia Lai	100			Ia Pet Dak Doa Wind Power Plant Number One JSC	Implementation		
Ia Pet Dak Doa 2	Ia Pet commune, Dak Doa district, Gia Lai province	Gia Lai	100			Ia Pet Dak Doa Wind Power Plant Number Two JSC	Implementation		
Huong Phung 1	Huong Do Hamlet, Huong Phung commune, Huong Hoa district, Quang Tri	Quang Tri	30	29/06/2019		EVNGENCO2	Implementation	The project is built of main items, with 10 turbine towers supporting 110m high, each for a turbine of 3.63MW; lifting stations 0.69/22kV-4,300kVA and internal 22kV electric network; Transformer station Huong Phung 1 22/110kV-1×40MVA; the 110kV line is about 21.5 km long from Huong Phung 1 substation to Lao Bao 220kV substation; construction road system for management and operation, auxiliary area for construction; operation manager.	
Huong Phung 2	Doa Cuoi Hamlet, Huong Phung commune, Huong Hoa district, Quang Tri	Quang Tri	20	27/06/2019		Huong Phung Wind Power Ltd. Co.	Implementation		
Huong Phung 3	Huong Phung commune, Huong Hoa district, Quang Tri	Quang Tri	30	27/06/2019		Huong Phung wind power Ltd. Co.	Implementation		
Khai Long Phase 1	Dat Mui commune, Ngoc Hien district, Ca Mau province	Ca Mau	100	26/09/2016		Super Wind Energy Cong Ly 1 JSC	Implementation	Delayed. Changed investors from Cong Ly to JV Cong Ly+Super Wind Energy (Thailand)	
Binh Dai Phase I	Thua Duc commune, Binh Dai district, Ben Tre province	Ben Tre	30	28/11/2017		TTC-Mekong Wind JSC	Implementation		
Huong Linh 3	Huong Hoa district, Quang Tri province	Quang Tri	30	06/2019		Huong Linh 3 JSC (Tan Hoan Cau Group)	Implementation	DZ110 double circuit, ACSR300 conductor, about 10.2 km long into 110kV busbar of 220kV Lao Bao station	
KOSY Bac Lieu	Vinh Minh A commune, Hoa Binh district, Bac Lieu province	Bac Lieu	40			Kosy Bac Lieu Wind Power JSC	Implementation		7201/BCT-DL
Quoc Vinh Soc Trang (Soc Trang 6)	Vinh Hai commune, Vinh Chau district, Soc Trang province	Soc Trang	30			Quoc Vinh Wind Power Ltd	Implementation		
Soc Trang 18		Soc Trang	22.4			Trung Thinh Soc Trang Energy Company Limited	Implementation		
Song An	An Khe district, Gia Lai province	Gia Lai	46.2			Song An Wind Power JSC	Implementation		
Tai Tam	Huong Phung commune, Huong Hoa district, Quang Tri province	Quang Tri province	50			Tai Tam Quang Tri Energy Investment Company	Implementation		
Tan An 1	Tan An commune, Ngoc Hien district, Ca Mau province	Ca Mau	25			Song Lam Investment Hydropower JSC	Implementation		
Tan Lien 1 phase 1 (AMACCAO Quang Tri 1)	Tan Lien and Huc commune, Huong Hoa district, Quang Tri province	Quang Tri	49.2			Khe Sanh Wind Power JSC	Implementation		
Tan Linh	Huong Tan and Huong Linh commune, Huong Hoa district, Quang Tri province	Quang Tri	48			Tan Linh Wind Power JSC	Implementation		
Tan Phu Dong	Go Cong Dong district, Tien Giang province	Tieng Giang	150			Hoa Viet Corporation			
Tan Tan Nhat - Dak Glei	Dak Glei commune, Dak Glei district, Kon Tum province	Kon Tum	50			Tan Tan Nhat JSC			
Tan Thuan	Tan Thuan commune, Dam Doi district, Ca Mau province	Ca Mau	75			Ca Mau Renewable Energy Investment JSC			
Hanbaram	Tan Hai commune, Ninh Hai district, Ninh Thuan province	Ninh Thuan	117			Hanbaram Wind Power JSC			
Thanh Phu	Thanh Phu district, Ben Tre province	Ben Tre	120						
Thien Phu	Thanh Phu district, Ben Tre province	Ben Tre	30			Thien Phu Energy Investment JSC			
Thien Phu 2	Thanh Phu district, Ben Tre province	Ben Tre	30			Thien Phu Energy Investment JSC			
TNC Quang Tri 1	Huong Hoa district, Quang Tri province	Quang Tri	50			TNC Quang Tri 1 Wind Power JSC			
TNC Quang Tri 2	Huong Hoa district, Quang Tri province	Quang Tri	50						
Soc Trang 2	Vinh Chau district, Soc Trang province	Soc Trang	30			Dai Phong Development Investment JSC	Implementation		
Soc Trang 3	Vinh Chau district, Soc Trang province	Soc Trang	29.4	01/11/2019		BanPu - Thailand Co., Ltd.	Implementation	Metmast installed, FS underway	
Soc Trang 7	Vinh Hai commune, Vinh Chau district, Soc Trang province	Soc Trang	29.4			Xuan Cau LLC	Implementation		
Tra Vinh 3	Hiep Thanh commune, Duyen Hai town, Tra Vinh province	Tra Vinh	78			Ecotech Tra Vinh	Implementation		
Phuoc Huu - Duyen Hai 1	Phuoc Huu commune, Ninh Phuoc district, Ninh Thuan province	Ninh Thuan	30			Phuoc Huu Duyen Hai 1 Wind Power Ltd	Implementation		
Phuoc Minh wind farm	Phuoc Minh commune, Ninh Thuan province	Ninh Thuan	27.3	Q1-2019		Adani Phuoc Minh Wind Power Ltd.(Adani+TVS)	Implementation	Transit 110kV Ninh Phuoc - Phan Ri (AC300, 1 km) (Adani 80%, TVS 20%). Total capacity registered 48.3MW	
Thuan Nhien Phong	Hoa Thang commune, Bac Binh district, Binh Thuan province	Binh Thuan	32			Thuan Nhien Phong Wind Power Ltd	Implementation		
Huong Hiep 1	Huong Hiep commune, Dakrong district, Quang Tri province	Quang Tri	30			Huong Hiep 1 Wind Power JSC	Implementation		
Gelex 1, 2, 3	Huong Linh and Huong Hiep communes, Dakrong district, Quang Tri province	Quang Tri	90			Quang Tri Gelex Energy company	Implementation	Equity Huong Phung wind power JSC 20%	
Thai Hoa	Hoa Thang commune, Bac Binh district, Binh Thuan province	Binh Thuan	90			Pacific Energy - Binh Thuan JSC	Implementation	Metmast installed	
Chinh Thang Wind Energy	Thuan Nam and Ninh Phuoc districts, Ninh Thuan	Ninh Thuan	50	25/04/2019		Chinh Thang Wind Power Ltd.	Implementation	Transit 110kV Thap Cham - Ninh Phuoc (ACSR 300, 0.1 km)	
7A Ninh Thuan	Phuoc Minh commune, Thuan Nam district, Ninh Thuan province	Ninh Thuan	50			Ha do Thuan Nam Wind Energy One Member Company Limited	Implementation		
BT 1	Gia Ninh and Hai Ninh commune, Quang Ninh district, Quang Binh province	Quang Binh	109			BT1 Wind Power JSC	Implementation		
BT 2	Ngu Thuy Bac commune, Le Thuy district, Quang Binh province	Quang Binh	100			BT1 Wind Power JSC	Implementation		
V1-3 Ben Tre	An Thuy commune, Ba Tri district, Ben Tre province	Ben Tre	30			Ben Tre Renewable Energy JSC	Implementation		
Phong Dien 1 - phase 2	Binh Thuan commune, Tuy Phong district, Binh Thuan province	Binh Thuan	30			Binh Thuan Renewable Energy No2 Company Limited	Implementation		
Che bien Tay Nguyen	Chu Prong district, Gia Lai province	Gia Lai	50			Chu Prong Gia Lai Wind Power JSC	Implementation		
Cho Long	Cho Long commune, Kong Chro district, Gia Lai province	Gia Lai	155			Cho Long Wind Power JSC	Implementation		
Cuu An	Cuu An commune, An Khe district, Gia Lai province	Gia Lai	46.2			Cuu An Wind Power JSC	Implementation		
Dak N'Drung 1	Dak Song district, Dak Nong province	Dak Nong	100			Dak N'Drung Energy Company	Implementation		
Dak N'Drung 2	Dak Song district, Dak Nong province	Dak Nong	100			Dak N'Drung 1 Energy Company	Implementation		
Dak N'Drung 3	Dak Song district, Dak Nong province	Dak Nong	100			Dak N'Drung 2 Energy Company	Implementation		
Number 5 Thanh Hai 1	Thanh Hai commune, Thanh Phu district, Ben Tre province	Ben Tre	30			Tan Hoan Cau Ben Tre JSC	Implementation		
5 Ninh Thuan	Phuoc Huu commune, Ninh Phuoc district, Ninh Thuan province	Ninh Thuan	46.2			Phuoc Huu Trung Nam Wind Power JSC	Implementation		
Tra Vinh V1-2 (Duyen Hai phase 1)	Truong Long Hoa commune, Duyen Hai district, Tra Vinh province	Tra Vinh	48			Truong Thanh Group + Sermsang Power Corporation			
Tra Vinh V1-3	Truong Long Hoa commune, Duyen Hai district, Tra Vinh province	Tra Vinh	48			REE Corporation			7201/BCT-DL
Vien An	Ngoc Hien district, Ca Mau province	Ca Mau	50						
VPL	Binh Dai district, Ben Tre province	Ben Tre	30			VPL Energy JSC			
Yang Trung	Kong Chro district, Gia Lai	Gia Lai	145			Yang Trung Wind Power JSC			
Thanh Phong	Thanh Hai commune, Thanh Phu district, Ben Tre province	Ben Tre	29.7			ECOWIN Energy JSC			
Wind power plant number 7	Vinh Hai commune, Vinh Chau district, Soc Trang province	Soc Trang	30			Soc Trang Energy JSC			
HBRE Phu Yen	An Tho, An Hiep and An Linh communes, Tuy An district, Phu Yen province	Phu Yen	200			Super Energy Corporation	Preparation		
HBRE Gia Lai	Ia Bang and Ia Phin communes, Chu Prong district, Gia Lai province	Gia Lai	50			Super Energy Corporation	Preparation		
Soc Trang 4	Vinh Chau district, Soc Trang province	Soc Trang	350			General Trading Construction JSC	Preparation		
Soc Trang 8	Vinh Chau district, Soc Trang province	Soc Trang	100			Trac Viet Renewable Energy Co., Ltd.	Preparation		
Soc Trang 11	Cu Lao Dung district, Soc Trang province	Soc Trang	100			Xuan Thien Yen Bai LLC	Preparation		
Soc Trang 16	Vinh Chau district, Soc Trang province	Soc Trang	40			Envision Energy LLC	Preparation		
Hoa Thang 1.2	Hoa Thang commune and Cho Lau town (Bac Binh district, Binh Thuan province)	Binh Thuan	100			Hoa Thang Energy JSC	Preparation	Transit 110kV Luong Son-Hoa Thang-Mui Ne, wire ACSR 240, 11 km long	
Hiep Thanh - Tra Vinh	Duyen Hai town, Tra Vinh province	Tra Vinh	78				Preparation		
Saigon - Binh Thuan	Bac Binh district, Binh Thuan province	Binh Thuan	200			Saigon-Binh Thuan power investment JSC	Preparation		
Phuong Mai 1	Nhon Hoi Economic Zone, Quy Nhon, Binh Dinh	Binh Dinh	30			Phuong Mai wind power JSC	Preparation	Applying to adjust the connection plan to 110kV, transfer Phuoc Son - Nhon Hoi (AC240-5 km)	
Phuong Mai 2	Nhon Hoi Economic Zone, Quy Nhon, Binh Dinh	Binh Dinh	60			GGP Corp. (Germany)	Preparation		
Bach Long Vi island	Bach Long Vi island, Hai Phong province	Hai Phong	1			National Youth Union	Preparation		
Phuoc Dan	Phuoc Hau, Phuoc Thai, Phuoc Huu communes and Phuoc Dan town, Ninh Phuoc district, Ninh Thuan province.	Ninh Thuan	45			Thuong Tin Power company (Sacomreal)	Preparation		
Nhon Hoi	Phu Hau village, Cat Chanh commune, Phu Cat district	Binh Dinh	30			Fico Investment JSC	Preparation		
Cong Hai	Cong Hai commune, Thuan Bac district, Ninh Thuan province	Ninh Thuan	29			Saigon Industry Corporation	Preparation		
Phuoc Thanh	Phuoc Thanh commune, Bac Ai district, Ninh Thuan province	Ninh Thuan	18			Global Energy Investment and Consultantcy	Preparation		
UPC - Quang Binh 1,2,3,4	Le Thuy, Quang Binh	Quang Binh	120			UPC Renewables Asia	Preparation	2/7/2018 first met Local authority	
Huong Hoa 1	Huong Loc, A Tuc and A Doi communes, Huong Hoa district, Quang Tri province	Quang Tri	64			Licogi 16	Preparation	Construction of 220kV double circuit line with a length of about 20 km from the factory connected to the 220kV busbar of 220kV Lao Bao substation; Construction of 220kV distribution yard for wind power plant 2×80MVA; expanding 2 dividers on 220kV bus bar of 220kV Lao Bao substation to connect the line circuits from the factory	
Huong Son 2	Huong Son commune, Huong Hoa district, Quang Tri	Quang Tri	30			EVNGENCO2 (Song Bung hydroelectric management 2)	Preparation	Huong Son 2 wind power plant is expected to connect to the national electricity system with the plan to build a 22/110kV transformer station at Huong Son 2 wind power plant; construction of single circuit line, ACSR-185 wire with a length of about 6 km; to build a new 110kV highway at 110kV Huong Phung 1 station.	
Ke Ga offshore wind farm	Tan Thanh commune, Ham Thuan Nam district, Binh Thuan province	Binh Thuan	3400			Enterprize Energy	Preparation	Pre-FS underway	
Mang Yang wind farm	Mang Yang district, Gia Lai province	Gia Lai	200			Mirat Energy + HLP	Preparation		
Thai Phong	Chi Cong, Hoa Minh and Phong Phu communes, Tuy Phong district, Binh Thuan province	Binh Thuan	52.5			Pacific Energy - Binh Thuan JSC	Preparation	Metmast installed	
Nexif Energy Ben Tre Wind Power Plant	Thanh Phu district, Ben Tre province	Ben Tre	80			EVNEPTC, Nexif Energy (Singapore)	Preparation	Nexif Energy signs 30 MW PPA with Electric Power Trading Company (EPTC) for first phase of wind farm in Ben Tre Province.	
Asia Dak Song 1	Dak Song district, Dak Nong Province	Dak Nong	50				Preparation		
Bao Thanh	Ba Tri district, Ben Tre province	Ben Tre	50				Preparation		
BCG Soc Trang 1	Hoa Dong commune, Vinh Chau district, Soc Trang province	Soc Trang	50			Bamboo Capital Group	Preparation		
19 Ben Tre	Thua Duc commune, Binh Dai district, Ben Tre province	Ben Tre	50			Bamboo Capital Group	Preparation		
20 Ben Tre	Thua Duc commune, Binh Dai district, Ben Tre province	Ben Tre	50			Bamboo Capital Group	Preparation		
BIM	Thuan Nam district, Ninh Thuan province	Ninh Thuan	88			BIM Group	Preparation		
Binh Dai 2	Thua Duc commune, Binh Dai district, Ben Tre province	Ben Tre	49			Me Kong Wind Power JSC	Preparation		
Binh Dai 3	Thua Duc commune, Binh Dai district, Ben Tre province	Ben Tre	49			Me Kong Wind Power JSC	Preparation		
Cong Hai 1 phase 2	Cong Hai commune, Thuan Bac district, Ninh Thuan province	Ninh Thuan	25			Saigon Industry Corporation	Preparation		
Cong Ly Ba Ria - Vung Tau	Xuyen Moc district, Ba Ria Vung Tau province	Ba Ria Vung Tau	102				Preparation		
Cu Ne 1	Krong Buk district, Dak Lak province	Dak Lak	50				Preparation		
Cu Ne 2	Krong Buk district, Dak Lak province	Dak Lak	50				Preparation		
Dak Hoa	Dak Song district, Dak Nong province	Dak Nong	50				Preparation		
Dam Nai 3	Bac Son commune, Thuan Bac district, Ninh Thuan province	Ninh Thuan	39.4				Preparation		
Dam Nai 4	Bac Son commune, Thuan Bac district, Ninh Thuan province	Ninh Thuan	27.6				Preparation		
Dong Thanh 1	Dong Hai commune, Duyen Hai district, Tra Vinh province	Tra Vinh	80				Preparation		
Dong Thanh 2	Dong Hai commune, Duyen Hai district, Tra Vinh province	Tra Vinh	120				Preparation		
Ea H'Leo 1, 2	Ea H'Leo and Ea Wy commune, Ea H'Leo district, Dak Lak province	Dak Lak	57			Thuan Binh Wind Power JSC	Preparation		
Hai Anh	Lao Bao commune, Huong Hoa district, Quang Tri province	Quang Tri	40				Preparation		
Huong Hiep 2	Huong Hiep commune, Dakrong district, Quang Tri province	Quang Tri	30				Preparation		
Huong Hiep 3	Huong Hiep commune, Dakrong district, Quang Tri province	Quang Tri	30				Preparation		
Ia Boong - Chu Prong	Ia Boong and Ia Me commune, Chu Prong district, Gia Lai province	Gia Lai	50				Preparation		
Khai Long phase 2	Dat Mui commune, Ngoc Hien district, Ca Mau province	Ca Mau	100			Super Wind Energy Cong Ly JSC	Preparation		
Khai Long phase 3	Dat Mui commune, Ngoc Hien district, Ca Mau province	Ca Mau	100			Super Wind Energy Cong Ly JSC	Preparation		
Kon Plong	Kon Plong district, Kon Tum province	Kon Tum	103.5				Preparation		
Krong Buk 1	Krong Buk district, Dak Lak province	Dak Lak	50				Preparation		
Krong Buk 2	Krong Buk district, Dak Lak province	Dak Lak	50				Preparation		
LIG Huong Hoa 1	Huong Loc and A Tuc commune, Huong Hoa district, Quang Tri province	Quang Tri	48			Licogi 16	Preparation		
LIG Huong Hoa 2	Huong Loc and A Tuc commune, Huong Hoa district, Quang Tri province	Quang Tri	48			Licogi 16	Preparation		
Loi Hai	Loi Hai commune, Thuan Bac district, Ninh Thuan province	Ninh Thuan	50			Thuan BInh Wind Power JSC	Preparation		
Long My 1	Vinh Vien A commune, Long My district, Hau Giang province	Hau Giang	100				Preparation		
Nexif Ben Tre phase 2, 3	Thanh Hai commune, Thanh Phu district, Ben Tre province	Ben Tre	50			NEXIF ENERGY BEN TRE ONE MEMBER COMPANY LIMITED	Preparation		
Phu Cuong Soc Trang	Vinh Chau district, Soc Trang province	Soc Trang	200			Phu Cuong Group Corporation + Mainstream Renewable Power	Preparation		
Soc Trang 11	Cu Lao Dung district, Soc Trang province	Soc Trang	101			Xuan Thien Yen Bai Company Limited	Preparation		
Soc Trang 16	Vinh Chau district, Soc Trang province	Soc Trang	40			Envision Energy	Preparation		
Soc Trang 4	Vinh Chau district, Soc Trang province	Soc Trang	350				Preparation		
Soc Trang 7 phase 2	Vinh Hai commune, Vinh Chau district, Soc Trang province	Soc Trang	90			Xuan Cau Company Limited	Preparation		
Song Hau	Long Phu and Tran De district, Soc Trang province	Soc Trang	50				Preparation		
Tan Hop	Huc commune, Huong Hoa district, Quang Tri province	Quang Tri	38				Preparation		
Tran De	Tran De district, Soc Trang province	Soc Trang	50				Preparation		
Vietnam Power number 1	Thuan Nam district, Ninh Thuan province	Ninh Thuan	30			Palatial Global Inc	Preparation		
La Gan		Binh Thuan	3500			Copenhagen Infrastructure Partners	Preparation		

== Biomass ==
This section mentions both plants using biomass products (bagasse,...) and municipal solid waste (MSW).

Source: updated using press releases.

Plant name	Location	Capacity (MW)	Operation time	Technology	Fuel type	Sponsor/owner	Note	Ref
KCP - Phu Yen Phase 1	Phu Yen	30	2017	Combustion	Bagasse	KCP Vietnam Industries Limited		
Tuyen Quang	Tuyen Quang	25	2019	Combustion	Bagasse			
An Khe	Gia Lai	110	2017	Combustion	Bagasse	Quang Ngai Sugar JSC		
Go Cat	Ho Chi Minh City	2.5	2017	Combustion	MSW	Hydraulic and Machine Co., Ltd		
Can Tho	Can Tho	7.5	2018	Combustion	MSW	EB Can Tho Environmental Energy LLC & China Everbright International Corporation		
Nam Son	Hanoi	2	2017	Combustion	MSW	Urban Environment Company (URENCO) & Hitachi Zosen Company - Japan		
Sugar mills		150		CHP				
Soc Son	Hanoi	90	2022	Combustion	MSW			
KCP - Phu Yen Phase 2	Phu Yen	30				KCP Vietnam industries limited	Announced	

== Hydroelectricity ==
This section mentions only medium and large hydro power plants (capacity >= 30 MW).

Source: updated with data from Ministry of Industry and Trade (MOIT) 2019 Report 58/BC-CBT, updated using press releases.

Station	Location	Capacity (MW)	Commission time	Sponsor/owner	Note	Ref
Sơn La Dam	Mường La	6×400		Son La Hydropower Company/EVN		
Lai Chau		1200		Son La Hydropower Company/EVN		
Lai Chau #2, 3		2×400	2016	EVN		Report 58/BC-CBT annex row I.2
Ban Chat		220		Huoi Quang-Ban Chat hydropower company/EVN		
Huoi Quang		520		Huoi Quang-Ban Chat hydropower company/EVN		
Huoi Quang #2		260	2016	EVN		Report 58/BC-CBT annex row I.1
Hoa Binh		1960		Hoa Binh Hydropower Company/EVN	2,400 by 2024	
Tuyen Quang		342		Tuyen Quang Hydropower Company/EVN		
Pleikrong		100		Yaly Hydropower Company/EVN		
Yaly		720		Yaly Hydropower Company/EVN		
Se San 3		260		Yaly Hydropower Company/EVN		
Se San 4		360		Se San Hydropower Development Company/EVN		
Tri An		400		Tri An Hydropower Company/EVN		
Thac Mo expansion		75	2017	Thac Mo expansion hydropower plant project/EVN		Report 58/BC-CBT annex row I.7
Ban Ve		320		Ban Ve Hydropower Company/EVNGENCO 1		
Khe Bo		100		Khe Bo Hydropower Company/EVNGENCO 1		
Trung Son		4×65	2017	Trung Son Hydropower One Member LLC/EVNGENCO 2		Report 58/BC-CBT annex row I.3
Quang Tri		64		Quang Tri Hydropower Company/EVNGENCO 2		
A Vuong		210		A Vuong Hydropower JSC/EVNGENCO 2		
Buon Tua Srah		86		Buon Kuop Hydropower Company/EVNGENCO 3		
Buon Kuop		280		Buon Kuop Hydropower Company/EVNGENCO 3		
Srepok 3		220		Buon Kuop Hydropower Company/EVNGENCO 3		
Song Tranh 2		190		Song Tranh Hydropower Company/EVNGENCO 1		
An Khe		160		Song Ba Ha Hydropower JSC/EVNGENCO 2		
Song Ba Ha		220		Song Bung Hydropower Company/EVNGENCO 2		
Bung River 2		2×50	2018	EVNGENCO 2		Report 58/BC-CBT annex row I.8
Song Bung 4		156		Dong Nai Hydropower Company/EVNGENCO 2		
Dong Nai 3		180		Dong Nai Hydropower Company/EVNGENCO 1		
Dong Nai 4		340		Thac Mo Hydropower JSC/EVNGENCO 1		
Thac Mo		150		Da Nhim-Ham Thuan-Da Mi Hydropower JSC/EVNGENCO 2		
Da Nhim		160		Da Nhim-Ham Thuan-Da Mi Hydropower JSC/EVNGENCO 1		
Da Nhim expansion		80	2019	Da Nhim-Ham Thuan-Da Mi Hydropower JSC/EVNGENCO 1	Generated 40MW	Report 58/BC-CBT annex row I.10
Thuong Kon Tum		2×110	2019	EVN		Report 58/BC-CBT annex row I.11
Ham Thuan		300		Da Nhim-Ham Thuan-Da Mi Hydropower JSC/EVNGENCO 1		
Da Mi		175		Dai Ninh Hydropower Company/EVNGENCO 1		
Dai Ninh		300		Hoang Anh-Gia Lai Hydropower JSC (Bitexco)/EVNGENCO 1		
Ba Thuoc 1		60		Hoang Anh-Gia Lai Hydropower JSC (Bitexco)		
Ba Thuoc 2		80		Bac Ha Hydropower JSC		
Bac Ha		90		IPP		
Bac Me		45		Construction Commercial Joint Stock Corporation (Vietracimex)		
Bao Lam 3		50.6		Power Construction JSC No1 (PCC1)		
Chiem Hoa		48		International Investment Construction and Trade JSC (ICT)		
Chi Khe		41		Agrita Nghe Tinh energy JSC		
Cua Dat		97		Vinaconex P&C JSC		
Hua Na		180		Hua Na Hydropower JSC/PVN		
Huong Son		33		Huong Son Hydropower JSC		
Muong Hum		32		Muong Hum Hydropower JSC		
Nam Chien 1		200		Nam Chien Hydropower JSC		
Nam Chien 2		32		North-west Electric Investment And Development JSC		
Nam Cun		40		299 Construction and Trading JSC		
Nam Muc		44		Nam Muc Hydropower JSC (Bitexco)		
Nam Na 2		66		Hung Hai Construction LLC		
Nam Na 3		84		Hung Hai Construction LLC		
Nam Phang		36		Bac Ha Energy JSC		
Nam Toong		34		Sapa Hydropower One Member LLC		
Ngoi Hut 2		48		Truong Thanh Construction and Development Investment JSC		
Ngoi Hut 2A		8.4		Truong Thanh Construction and Development Investment JSC		
Ngoi Phat		72		Northern Electricity Development Investment JSC 2 (NEDI 2)		
Nhan Hac A		55		Za Hung JSC		
Nhan Hac B		4		Za Hung JSC		
Nho Que 1		32		Nho Que Hydropower JSC 1 (Bitexco)		
Nho Que 2		48		Nho Que Investment and Power Development JSC (Bitexco)		
Nho Que 3		110		Nho Que 3 One Member LLC (Bitexco)		
Song Bac		42		Song Bac Hydropower JSC		
Su Pan 2		34.5		Su Pan Hydropower JSC		
Ta Thang		60		Vietracimex Lao Cai Electric JSC		
Thac Ba		120		Thac Ba Hydropower JSC		
Thai An		82		Thai An Hydropower JSC		
Thuan Hoa		42		Thuan Hoa - Ha Giang Hydropower JSC		
Van Chan		57		Van Chan Hydropower JSC (Bitexco)		
A Luoi		170		Central Hydropower JSC (EVNCHP)		
Binh Dien		44		Binh Dien Hydropower JSC (Bitexco)		
Dakdrinh		125		Dakdrinh Hydropower JSC/PVN		
Dak Mi 3		63		Dak Mi 3 IDICO Hydropower JSC		
Dak Mi 4		208		Dak Mi Hydropower JSC (Bitexco)		
Dak R'Tih		144		Dak R'Tih Hydropower JSC		
Dong Nai 5		150		Dong Nai 5 Hydropower JSC/TKV		
Huong Dien		81		Huong Dien Investment JSC		
Krong H'nang		64		Song Ba JSC		
Se San 3A		108		Se San 3A Power Investment and Development JSC		
Se San 4A		63		Se San 4A Hydropower JSC		
Song Bung 4A		49		Phu Thach My JSC		
Song Bung 5		57		Power Engineering Consulting JSC 1 (PECC1)		
Song Con 2		63		Geruco - Song Con Hydropower JSC		
Song Giang 2		37		Song Giang Hydropower JSC		
Song Tranh 3		62		Song Tranh Hydropower JSC 3		
Srepok 4		80		Dai Hai Electric Investment and Development JSC		
Srepok 4A		64		Buon Don Hydropower JSC		
Vinh Son		66		Vinh Son - Song Hinh Hydropower JSC		
Song Hinh		70		Vinh Son - Song Hinh Hydropower JSC		
Bac Binh		33		Vietnam Power Development JSC (VNPD)		
Can Don		77.6		Can Don Hydroelectric JSC		
Da Dang 2		34		Southern Hydropower JSC (SHP)		
Dam Bri		75		Southern Hydropower JSC (SHP)		
Dong Nai 2		73		Trung Nam Power JSC		
Srokphumieng		51		Srok Phu Mieng IDICO Hydropower JSC		
Small hydro North		1931				
Small hydro Center		1137				
Small hydro South		254				
Ka Nak		13		EVNGENCO 2		
Sông Pha		7.5		Da Nhim-Ham Thuan-Da Mi Hydropower JSC/EVNGENCO 1		
Hoa Binh expansion		2×240	2023	EVN	Under construction or proposed	Report 58/BC-CBT annex row I.21
Ialy expansion		2×180	2023	EVN	Under construction or proposed	Report 58/BC-CBT annex row I.22
Tri An expansion		200	2025	EVN	Under construction or proposed	Report 58/BC-CBT annex row I.23
My Ly		250	2024	IPP	Under construction or proposed	Report 58/BC-CBT annex row V.5
Nam Mo		90	2026	IPP	Under construction or proposed	Report 58/BC-CBT annex row V.6

== Notes ==
=== For solar, wind power plants ===
Rooftop solar	RS
Operational	OP
Under Construction	UC
Groundbreaking	GB
Approved	AP

=== For gas, coal-fired power plants ===
- Announced: Projects that are in the planning decision of the government or companies but have not yet obtained a permit or permission for land use rights, coal supply rights...
- Pre-permit development: Projects have started to implement one of the following items: environmental licenses, land and water use rights, financial security, transmission contract guarantees, etc.
- Permitted: Projects that have been licensed for environmental licenses but have not yet begun to break ground.
- Construction: Projects are being built after the groundbreaking ceremony.
- Shelved: Projects do not have specific information on the project's progress but do not have enough information to declare the project canceled.
- Cancelled: Projects are not progressing after a very long time with no information about the project; Projects converted to natural gas are considered to have not used coal anymore; projects have appeared in government documents but then disappeared.
- Operating: Projects with an official date of Commercial Operation Date (COD).

== See also ==
- List of power stations in Asia
- List of largest power stations in the world
- Energy in Vietnam
- Renewable energy in Vietnam
