= Lai Châu Dam =

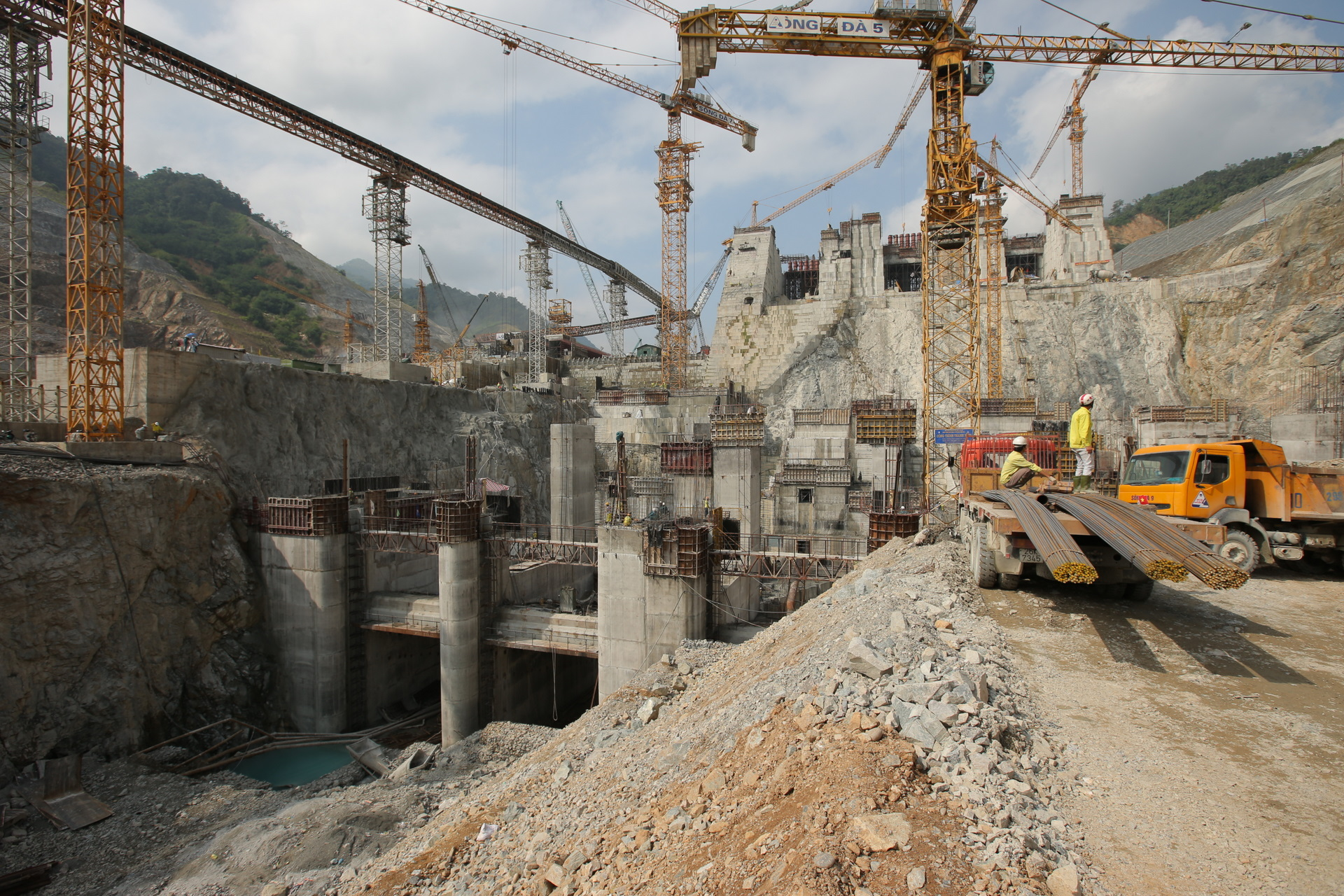
- Lai Châu Dam during construction in 2013

- Location within Vietnam
- Country: Vietnam
- Location: Lai Châu Province
- Coordinates: 22°8′22″N 102°59′7″E
- Status: Operational
- Construction began: 2011
- Opening date: 20 December 2016
- Construction cost: VND 35,700 billion
- Owner: EVN

Dam and spillways
- Impounds: Da River

Power Station
- Operator: EVN
- Commission date: 2017
- Turbines: 3 x 400 MW Francis turbines
- Installed capacity: 1,200 MW
- Capacity factor: 45%
- Annual generation: 4,670 GWh/yr

The Lai Châu Dam (Vietnamese: Nhà máy thủy điện Lai Châu) is a hydroelectric dam on the Black River inaugurated on 20 December 2016 in Lai Châu Province, Vietnam. The owner of the power station is Vietnam Electricity.

The dam was designed by Hydroproject, a Russian hydrotechnical design firm, in collaboration with the Vietnamese company Power Construction No.1 JSC. The ground clearance works and relocation of people was completed by September 2010. Construction started on 5 January 2011; it was expected to be operational by 2017 with the first turbine put into operation in 2016, but the plant was inaugurated on 20 December 2016, one year ahead of the schedule, in a ceremony attended by the Deputy Prime Minister Trịnh Đình Dũng and other important personalities.

The power station has three Francis turbines with a capacity of 400 MW each. Turbines have been manufactured at the Alstom's plant in Tianjin, China. The total capacity of the station is 1,200 MW. It is the third largest hydroelectric power station in Vietnam and the third on the Da river. It is connected with the Hòa Bình Dam completed in 1994, and the Sơn La Dam, inaugurated in 2012. The Lai Châu hydropower projects cost VND 35,700 billion.
