= Hydroproject =

Russian hydrotechnical design firm

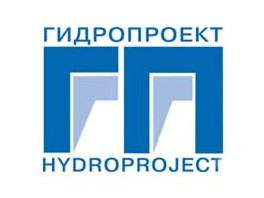
- Industry: Hydropower
- Founded: 1927
- Headquarters: Moscow, Russia
- Key people: Eugene Bellendir (CEO)
- Parent: RusHydro

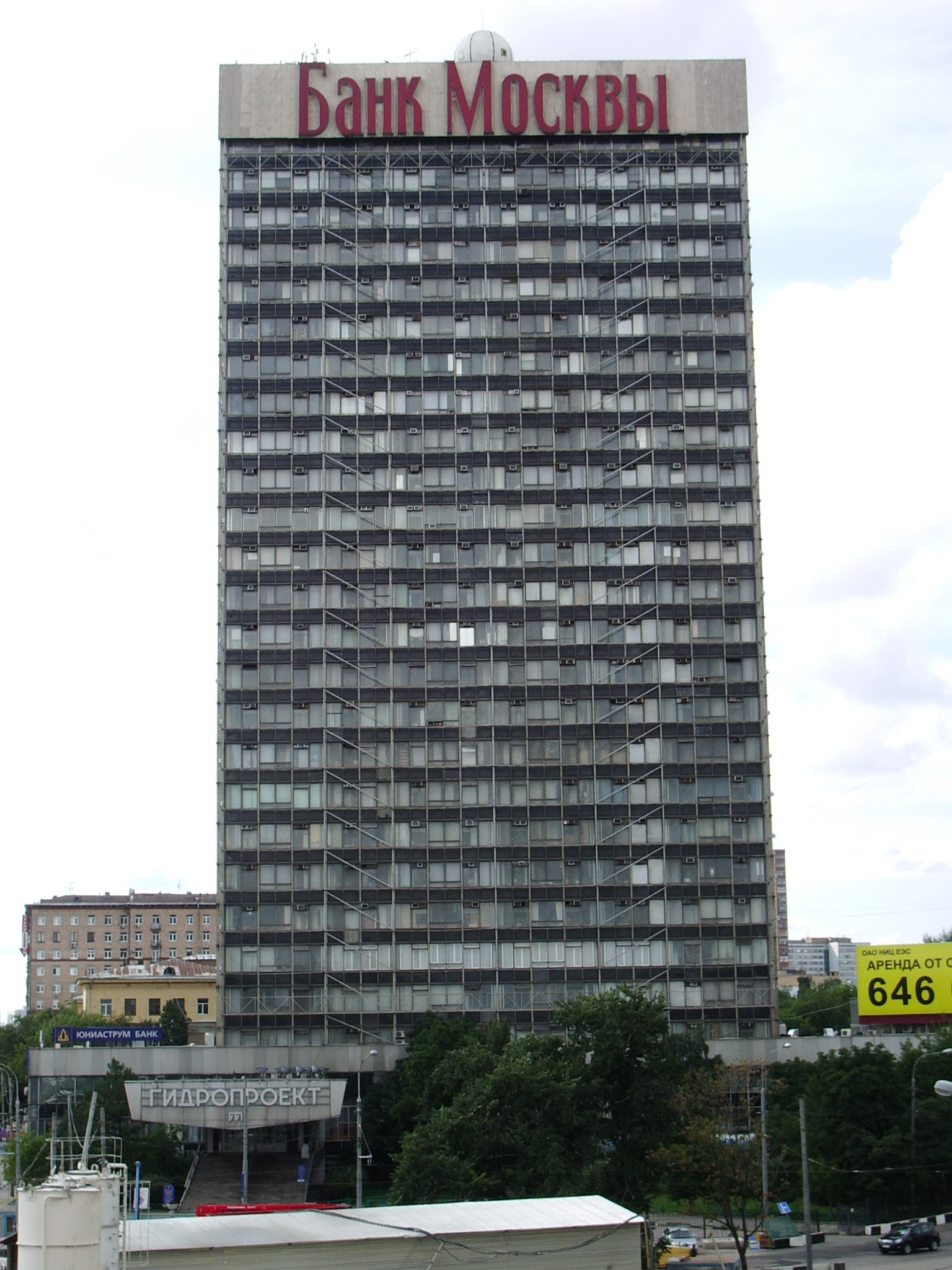
Hydroproject headquarters

Hydroproject (Russian: Институт «Гидропроект», Gidroproekt) is a Russian hydrotechnical design firm. Based in Moscow, it has a number of branches around the country. Its main activities are design of dams, hydroelectric stations, canals, sluices, etc.

Hydroproject and its predecessor institutions have designed most of the hydroelectric dams and irrigation and navigation canals that have been built in the Soviet Union and Russia since the 1930s. They have designed a number of high-profile projects abroad as well, from India to Egypt to Canada. The institute, under Sergey Zhuk's leadership, also researched the Northern river reversal's potential. It has also been involved in realizing nuclear power plants in the Soviet Union between 1969 and 1986.

One of Hydroproject's most famous projects was that of the 3rd and 4th units at the Chernobyl Nuclear Power Plant. They were tasked to design these RBMK reactors, due to the amount of water being used in each of these reactors. They also designed other nuclear reactors, such as that at the Kursk Nuclear Power Plant, and the Smolensk Nuclear Power Plant.

== History ==
Hydroproject traces its history to the design departments of the Moscow Canal Construction Project (the 1930s), and the Hydroelectrostroy Trust (Трест “Гидроэлектрострой”), which was formed on October 9, 1930, to coordinate the construction of hydroelectric dams in the USSR during its first five-year plan. The first director of the Hydroelectroproject Trust, the successor of the Hydroelectrostroy Trust, between 1932 and 1936, was Vissarion Chichinadze, who was executed during the Great Purge. The two organizations, after changing their names a number of times, were finally merged in 1962. Until 1950, they were within the ambit of the USSR Ministry of Internal Affairs; later, under the Ministry of Energy.

Some of the institute's regional branches, notably the one in Saint Petersburg, known as Lenhydroproject, have an even longer history. In the 1990s, the institute operated as a subsidiary of RAO UES, Russia's national electricity company. In 2010 it became part of the RusHydro group.

== Major projects ==
=== In the USSR ===
Dams:

- Most of the hydro dams on the Volga and Kama; see Zhiguli Hydroelectric Station for a list.
- Angara River dams: Irkutsk Hydroelectric Power Station, Bratsk Hydroelectric Power Station, Ust-Ilimsk Hydroelectric Power Station.
- Yenisei River dams: Krasnoyarsk Dam, Sayano-Shushenskaya Dam
- Inguri Dam, Georgia
- Nurek Dam, Tajikistan
- Rogun Dam, Tajikistan
- Toktogul Dam, Kyrgyzstan
- Pļaviņas Hydroelectric Power Station, Latvia
- Riga Hydroelectric Power Plant, Latvia
- Kruonis PSP, Lithuania

Canals:

- Moscow Canal
- Volga–Don Canal
- Volga–Baltic Waterway

Nuclear Power Plants:

- Kursk Nuclear Power Plant, Russia
- Smolensk Nuclear Power Plant, Russia
- Chernobyl Nuclear Power Plant, Ukraine

=== Outside the USSR ===
Dams:

- Capanda Dam, Angola
- Paraná Medio, Argentina (proposed)
- Jenpeg Dam, the first stage of Nelson River Hydroelectric Project in Manitoba, Canada
- Sanmenxia Dam, China
- Aswan Dam, Egypt
- Melka Wakena Dam, Ethiopia
- Tehri Dam, India
- Al-Bagdadi Dam, Iraq
- Haditha Dam, Iraq
- Dukan Dam, Iraq
- Limón Dam, Peru
- Iron Gate I Hydroelectric Power Station and Iron Gate II Hydroelectric Power Station on the Danube, Romania–Serbia
- Tabqa Dam (a.k.a. Euphrates Dam), Syria
- Tishrin Dam, Syria
- Yali Falls Dam, Vietnam
- Hòa Bình Dam, Vietnam
- Sơn La Dam, Vietnam
- Lai Châu Dam, Vietnam
