= Hòa Bình (city) =

- Provincial city (Class-3)
- Hòa Bình City; Thành phố Hòa Bình
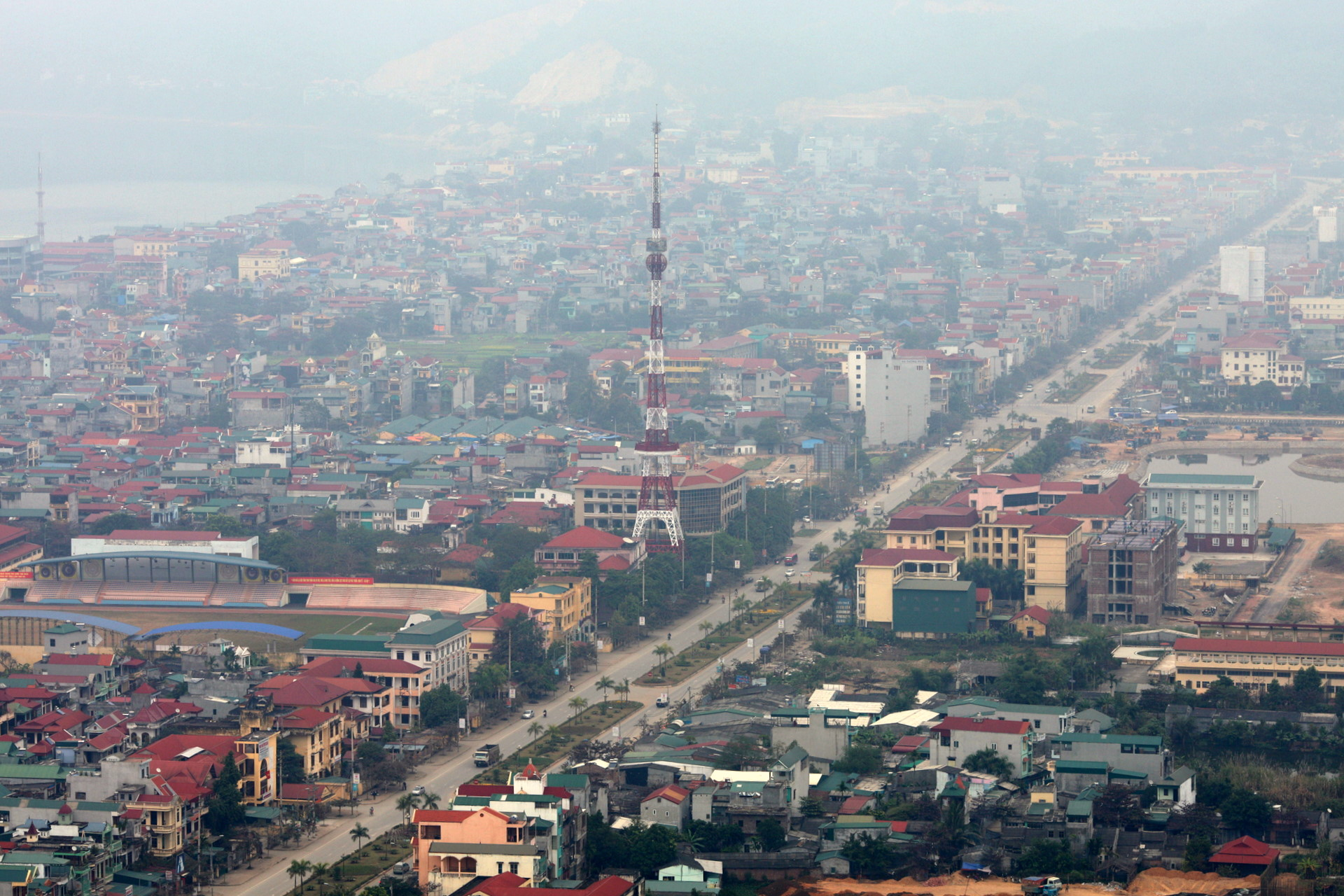
- Interactive map of Hòa Bình
- Location of Hòa Bình in Vietnam
- Coordinates: 20°48′48″N 105°20′18″E
- Country: Vietnam
- Province: Hòa Bình
- Subdivision: 12 wards and 7 rural communes

Area
  - Total: 348.65 km^{2} (134.61 sq mi)

Population (2024)
  - Total: 234,567
  - Density: 672.79/km^{2} (1,742.5/sq mi)
- Climate: Cwa
- Website: http://ubndtp.hoabinh.gov.vn/

Hòa Bình (Vietnamese: [hʷâː ɓîŋ̟]) is a former city in Vietnam. It is the capital of Hòa Bình Province, and is located 76 kilometres from Hanoi and 5 kilometres from the Đà River. The Battle of Hòa Bình was fought around the city from 1951 to 1952 during the First Indochina War.
Hòa Bình Dam, the largest hydroelectric dam in Vietnam until the 2012 completion of the Son La Dam, and also the largest in Southeast Asia, is located near the city. It was built by means of finances and experts from the Soviet Union.

== Demographics ==
As of 2019, the city had a population of 135,718, covering an area of 348.65 km^{2}.

== Administrative divisions ==
Hòa Bình City is divided into 19 commune-level sub-divisions, including 12 wards (Dân Chủ, Đồng Tiến, Hữu Nghị, Kỳ Sơn, Phương Lâm, Quỳnh Lâm, Tân Hòa, Tân Thịnh, Thái Bình, Thịnh Lang, Thống Nhất, Trung Minh) and 7 rural communes (Độc Lập, Hòa Bình, Hợp Thành, Mông Hóa, Quang Tiến, Thịnh Minh, Yên Mông).

== Climate ==
Climate data for Hòa Bình
| Month | Jan | Feb | Mar | Apr | May | Jun | Jul | Aug | Sep | Oct | Nov | Dec | Year |
|---|---|---|---|---|---|---|---|---|---|---|---|---|---|
| Record high °C (°F) | 35.4 (95.7) | 36.8 (98.2) | 38.8 (101.8) | 41.6 (106.9) | 42.5 (108.5) | 41.8 (107.2) | 40.7 (105.3) | 39.7 (103.5) | 38.1 (100.6) | 37.5 (99.5) | 36.5 (97.7) | 33.2 (91.8) | 42.5 (108.5) |
| Mean daily maximum °C (°F) | 20.6 (69.1) | 21.9 (71.4) | 24.9 (76.8) | 29.4 (84.9) | 32.9 (91.2) | 33.9 (93.0) | 33.6 (92.5) | 32.8 (91.0) | 31.7 (89.1) | 29.2 (84.6) | 26.1 (79.0) | 22.6 (72.7) | 28.3 (82.9) |
| Daily mean °C (°F) | 16.5 (61.7) | 18.0 (64.4) | 20.9 (69.6) | 24.8 (76.6) | 27.5 (81.5) | 28.7 (83.7) | 28.6 (83.5) | 28.1 (82.6) | 27.0 (80.6) | 24.5 (76.1) | 21.1 (70.0) | 17.8 (64.0) | 23.6 (74.5) |
| Mean daily minimum °C (°F) | 14.0 (57.2) | 15.6 (60.1) | 18.4 (65.1) | 21.8 (71.2) | 24.0 (75.2) | 25.4 (77.7) | 25.5 (77.9) | 25.2 (77.4) | 24.1 (75.4) | 21.4 (70.5) | 18.1 (64.6) | 14.8 (58.6) | 20.7 (69.3) |
| Record low °C (°F) | 1.9 (35.4) | 5.0 (41.0) | 7.2 (45.0) | 11.1 (52.0) | 16.7 (62.1) | 18.6 (65.5) | 19.6 (67.3) | 21.9 (71.4) | 16.1 (61.0) | 10.8 (51.4) | 5.1 (41.2) | 2.0 (35.6) | 1.9 (35.4) |
| Average rainfall mm (inches) | 20.5 (0.81) | 14.9 (0.59) | 35.1 (1.38) | 95.5 (3.76) | 244.0 (9.61) | 269.8 (10.62) | 310.6 (12.23) | 325.0 (12.80) | 285.5 (11.24) | 183.9 (7.24) | 55.0 (2.17) | 17.2 (0.68) | 1,857.1 (73.11) |
| Average rainy days | 8.6 | 9.2 | 11.5 | 14.0 | 18.1 | 18.2 | 18.9 | 18.4 | 14.2 | 11.5 | 7.4 | 5.8 | 155.9 |
| Average relative humidity (%) | 83.4 | 83.7 | 84.1 | 83.7 | 82.1 | 82.2 | 83.5 | 85.0 | 84.9 | 84.1 | 82.6 | 81.8 | 83.4 |
| Mean monthly sunshine hours | 87.2 | 69.7 | 73.4 | 121.7 | 183.4 | 170.3 | 181.4 | 174.3 | 172.6 | 158.3 | 140.1 | 122.3 | 1,654.7 |
Source: Vietnam Institute for Building Science and Technology, Nchmf.gov.vn (August record high)
