= BP Solar 1 (Vietnamese power plant) =

Coordinates: 11.540743°N 108.872938°E

The BP Solar 1 Power Plant is a solar power plant built on Phuoc Huu commune, Ninh Phuoc district, Ninh Thuan province, Vietnam.

The plant has an installed capacity of 45 MVA. Construction of the power plant started in June 2018, and it was inaugurated January 2019.

The power plant is built on an area of over 62 hectares, consisting of 124,380 panels in total. It also has a total capacity of 46 MWp, providing 74 million kWh per year to the Vietnamese power grid.

== See also ==
- List of solar power plants in Vietnam
