= TTC Krong Pa =

Vietnamese power plant

The TTC Krong Pa Solar Power Plant is a solar power plant built on Chu Gu commune, Krong Pa district, Gia Lai province, Vietnam.

TTC Krong Pa solar plant has an installed capacity of 49 MW (69 MWp), started in March 2018, energized on November 4, 2018, inaugurated in December 2018.

The factory is built on an area of 70.23 hectares of hilly land in the Chu Gu commune, that provides the nation's electricity system with an output of 103 million kWh a year, meeting the equivalent electricity demand of about 47,000 households. CO_{2} emissions are reduced by about 29,000 tons per year.

The factory is located next to National Route 25, 4 kilometers west of Phu Tuc town, Krong Pa district, 131 kilometers from Pleiku city, and 90.5 kilometers from Tuy Hoa city, Phu Yen province.

== See also ==
- List of solar power plants in Vietnam
