= LIG Quang Tri =

Solar power plant

LIG Quang Tri is a solar power plant built on the land of Gio Hai and Gio Thanh communes, Gio Linh district, Quang Tri province.

The LIG Quang Tri solar power plant has an installed capacity of 49.5 MW. The annual electricity production produced by the power plant is expected to be 67.63 million kWh. Its construction started in August 2018, and it was completed in June 2019, and inaugurated the same month.

The factory has an operating area of 58.6 hectares.

== See also ==
- List of solar power plants in Vietnam
