= Hòa Bình Dam =

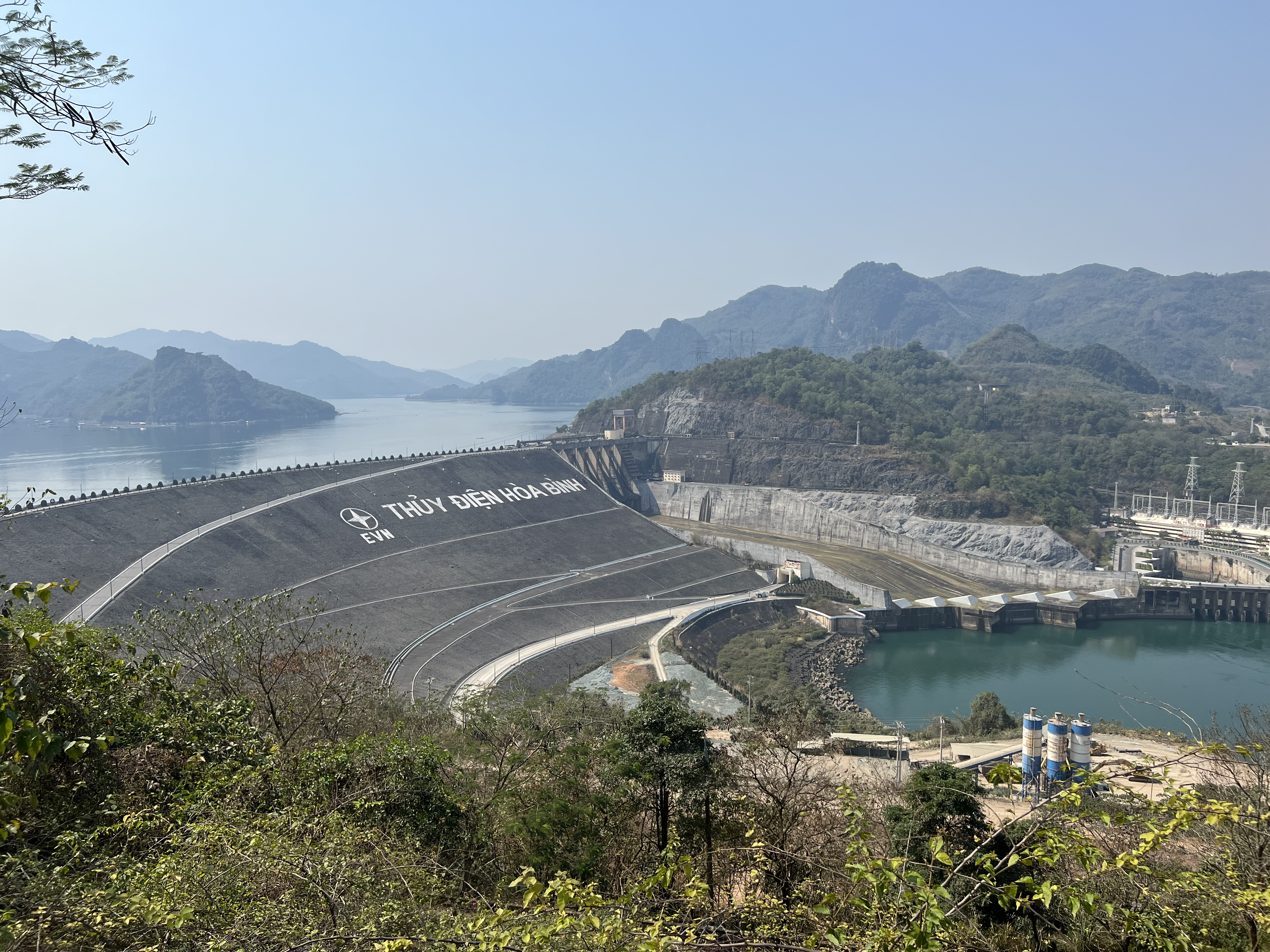
- Interactive map of Hòa Bình Dam
- Official name: Thuỷ điện Hoà Bình
- Country: Vietnam
- Location: Hòa Bình
- Coordinates: 20°48′30″N 105°19′26″E
- Status: Operational
- Construction began: November 1979
- Opening date: 1994
- Construction cost: ₫1.5 billion (1996)
- Owner: Vietnam Electricity
- Operator: Hoa Binh Hydro Power Company

Dam and spillways
- Type of dam: Embankment dam
- Impounds: Black River
- Height: 128 m (420 ft)
- Length: 970 m (3,182 ft)

Reservoir
- Creates: Sông Đà Reservoir
- Total capacity: 1,600,000,000 m^{3} (5.7×10^{10} ft^{3})
- Surface area: 208 km^{2} (80 mi^{2})

Power Station
- Type: Conventional
- Turbines: 8 × 240 MW
- Installed capacity: 1,920 MW
- Annual generation: 8,160 GWh

The Hòa Bình Dam on the Black River (Vietnamese: Sông Đà) is the largest hydroelectric dam in Vietnam from 1994 to 2012 (this record was broken by Sơn La Dam), and one of the largest in Southeast Asia, with a generating capacity of 1,920 MW. The Sông Đà Reservoir, with a capacity of 9 billion m^{3} was formed as the river was dammed.

The dam is located in Hòa Bình City of the Hòa Bình Province in the north of Vietnam. It measures 128 m (420 ft) in height, and 970 m (3,182 ft) in length. It is owned by Vietnam Electricity and operated by the Hoa Binh Hydro Power Company.

== Construction ==
In 1961, the North Vietnam government established a committee on exploring hydropower sites. This was followed by construction of the Thác Bà Dam, starting in 1963. After the Vietnamese reunification, damming the Black River was explored.

Financed and built with Soviet Union and Russian money and experts, construction on the rockfill dam began on November 6, 1979, and was completed in December 1994. The responsible engineer on site of the project was Russian Pavel Bagachenko. In 1986, the river was fully dammed. The first generator unit went operational in 1988, with the final unit starting in 1994.

The Russian engineers used experience from building the Aswan Dam for the construction. The dam structure goes up to 280 m deep in the surrounding rock. 30,000 workers, 5,000 soldiers and 750 Soviet engineers and 1,000 Vietnamese construction managers participated in the construction. Many of the Vietnamese volunteered to help with the construction of the dam. During construction there were 168 deaths, 11 Soviet experts and 157 Vietnamese.

The dam was built to high safety standards, due to earthquake risk in the area, and the enormous impact of dam failure. 12 million people would become homeless if the dam were to fail, and parts of Hanoi could be 30 m under water.

A letter from the Russian engineers to the future generation of Vietnamese people was sealed inside a concrete monument, to be opened on January 1, 2100.

== Power generation ==
Power is generated by utilizing eight turbines with a capacity of 240 MW, totaling an installed capacity of 1,920 MW.

When the dam was first completed, it fulfilled between 30% and 50% of Vietnam's electricity output. As this exceeded the demand of northern Vietnam, a 1,487 km north–south high-voltage line had to be constructed. By 2016 the dam accounted for 6% of Vietnam's total electricity output. Each year approximately 10 billion kWh of electricity is generated by the dam, providing around half of the government revenue of Hòa Bình Province. Since the dam went operational, as of 2021 it had produced a cumulative 230 billion kWh of electricity. The dam is staffed by 800 workers.

In January 2021, an expansion project commenced, adding an additional 480 MW to the generating capacity. When it is completed by the end of 2025, the maximum electricity generation output of the dam will be 2400 MW.

== Impact ==
In addition to electricity generation, the dam helps to ensure the stability of the power grid, protects Hanoi and the Red River Delta against floods, and helps to keep the downstream river navigable. Since its completion, the dam controlled dozens of major floods.

11,141 households, approximately 89,720 people, were relocated with 13 thousand ha of land being submerged.

On the neighboring Tượng Hill, an 18m high, 400 ton statue of Ho Chi Minh stands looking over the dam. The story goes that when Ho Chi Minh crossed the Red River here in a boat during the nation's struggle for independence against America he was so frustrated with the difficulty that he proclaimed that when North and South are reunified a dam will be built to calm the mighty river.

== See also ==
- List of power stations in Vietnam
- List of conventional hydroelectric power stations
