= Cam Hoa solar farm =

Solar farm in Vietnam

The Cam Hoa solar farm is a solar power plant built on the land of Cam Hoa commune, Cam Xuyen district, Ha Tinh province, Vietnam.

The Cam Hoa solar farm has an installed capacity of 50 MWp. Construction of the power was started in January 2019, and completed in June 2019.

Cam Hoa solar power project has been recognized as the first solar power project in Ha Tinh province. The power plant also has a working area of roughly 50 hectares.

== See also ==
- List of solar power plants in Vietnam
