= Tuy Phong =

- Commune
- Interactive map of Tuy Phong
- Coordinates: 11.268244335565791°N 108.64928513784213°E
- Country: Vietnam
- Region: South Central Coast and Central Highlands
- Province: Lâm Đồng
- Administrative headquarters: Phong Phú Hamlet 1

Area
  - Total: 444.10 km^{2} (171.47 sq mi)

Population (31 December 2024)
  - Total: 9,510
  - Density: 21/km^{2} (54/sq mi)

Tuy Phong is a commune in Lâm Đồng province, Vietnam.

On 16 June 2025, the Standing Committee of the National Assembly of Vietnam issued Resolution No. 1671/NQ-UBTVQH15 on the arrangement of commune-level administrative units in Lâm Đồng province in 2025. Under the resolution, the entire area and population of Phan Dũng commune and part of Phong Phú commune, formerly part of Tuy Phong district, were merged to form a new commune named Tuy Phong.
