= TTC Phong Dien =

Solar power plant in Vietnam

The TTC Phong Dien Solar Power Plant is a solar power plant built in Hoà Mỹ village, Dien Loc commune, Phong Điền District, Thừa Thiên-Huế Province, Vietnam.

The plant has an installed capacity of 35 MW, successfully energized on September 25, 2018, inaugurated in October 2018.

The project is built on an area of 45 hectares, with a capacity of 35 MWac equivalent to 48 MWp and an estimated annual electricity output of 61,570 MWh. The TTC Phong Dien solar power plant helps reduce CO_{2} emissions by about 20,503 tons/year, contributes to environmental protection, and contributes to global efforts to limit global warming.

== History ==
TTC Phong Dien solar power is the first solar power plant built in Vietnam.
