= Sơn La Dam =

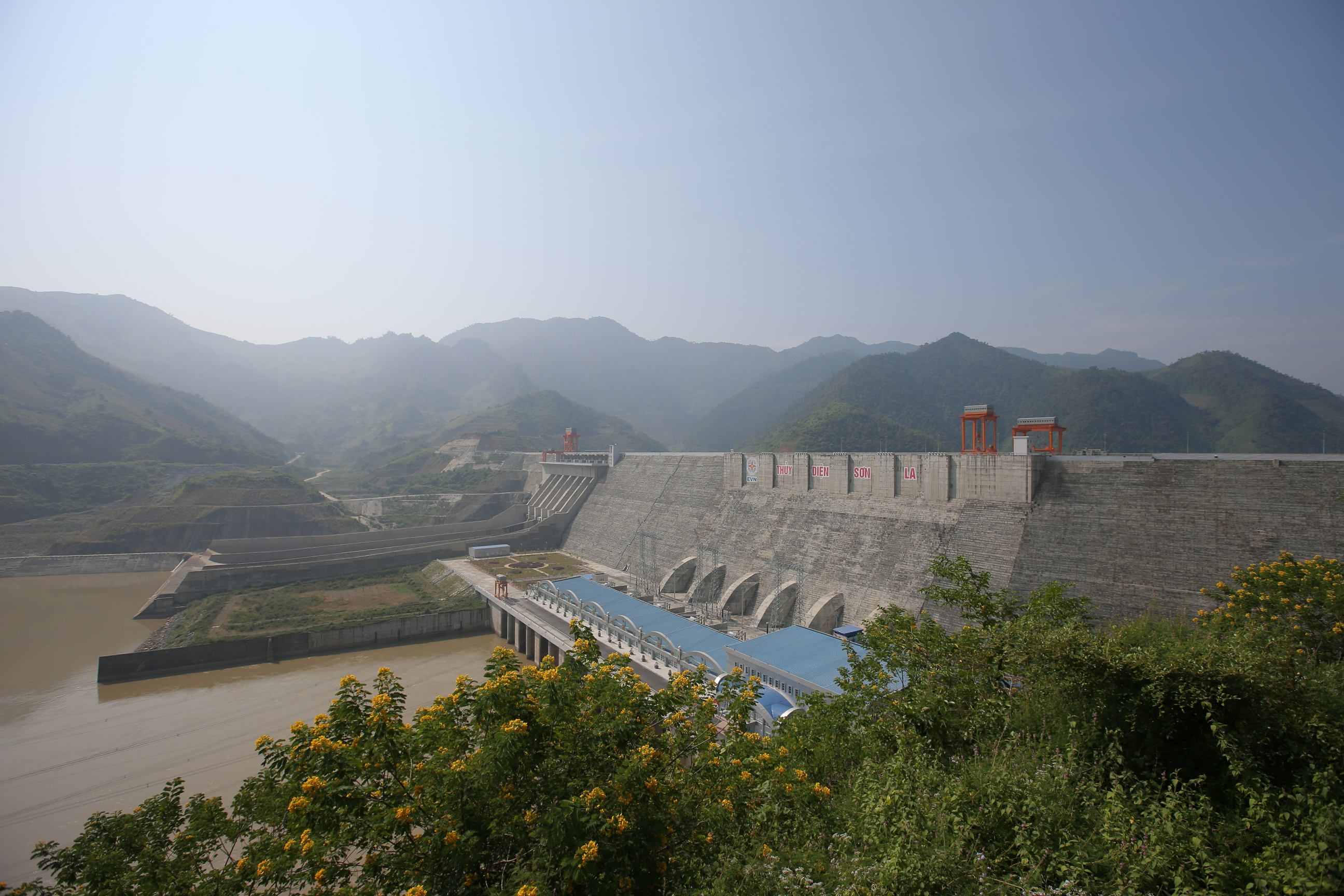

- Location within Vietnam
- Country: Vietnam
- Location: Ít Ong, Mường La District, Sơn La Province
- Coordinates: 21°29′47″N 103°59′42″E
- Status: Operational
- Construction began: 2005
- Opening date: 2012
- Owner: Vietnam Electricity

Dam and spillways
- Type of dam: Concrete gravity dam
- Impounds: Da River
- Height: 138 m (453 ft)
- Length: 1,000 m (3,300 ft)
- Width (base): 90 m (295 ft)
- Spillway capacity: 35,000 m^{3}/s (1,200,000 cu ft/s)

Reservoir
- Total capacity: 3.1 km^{3} (0.74 cu mi)
- Surface area: 440 km^{2} (170 sq mi)

Power Station
- Commission date: 2010
- Type: Conventional
- Turbines: 6 x 400 MW Francis type
- Installed capacity: 2,400 MW
- Annual generation: 10,246 GWh

Sơn La Dam is a concrete gravity dam on the Black River in Ít Ong, Mường La District, Sơn La Province, Vietnam. It is the largest hydroelectric power station in Southeast Asia.

== History ==
The project was proposed in the 1970s. Several studies were carried out, including by the Moscow Institute of Hydroelectric and Industry, Electricity and Power Distribution Company (Japan), Designing Research and Production Shareholding Company (Moscow) and SWECO (Sweden). In May 2000, the National Assembly of Vietnam postponed the decision due to lack of information on relocation and compensation plans and for feasibility studies for a scaled-down version of the dam. The project was approved by the National Assembly in December 2002. Construction of the dam began on 2 December 2005.

On 17 December 2010, the first turbine was connected to the power grid. It was officially put into operation on 7 January 2011. The second turbine was put to operation on 10 May 2011, the third turbine on 20 October 2011, the fourth turbine on 22 December 2011, the fifth turbine on 30 April 2012, and the sixth turbine on 26 September 2012. The project was completed on 20 December 2012.

== Description ==
The dam is an RCC Gravity Dam 138 metres (453 ft) high and 90 metres (300 ft) wide at the base. Its length is over 1,000 metres (3,300 ft). It was designed by Hydroproject of Russia.

The power plant consists of six turbines with generating capacity of 400 MW each. It has a total capacity of 2,400 MW with an expected annual generation of 10,246 GWh. The total cost of the project was US$2 billion. The plant is owned by Vietnam Electricity. Turbines are installed by Lilama Joint Stock Co No 10.

== Impact ==
The project required displacement of more than 91,000 ethnic minority people, the largest resettlement in Vietnam's history. Two pilot resettlement sites were established in 2003, and resettlement started in 2005.
