= Vietnam Electricity =

Vietnamese Electricity Company

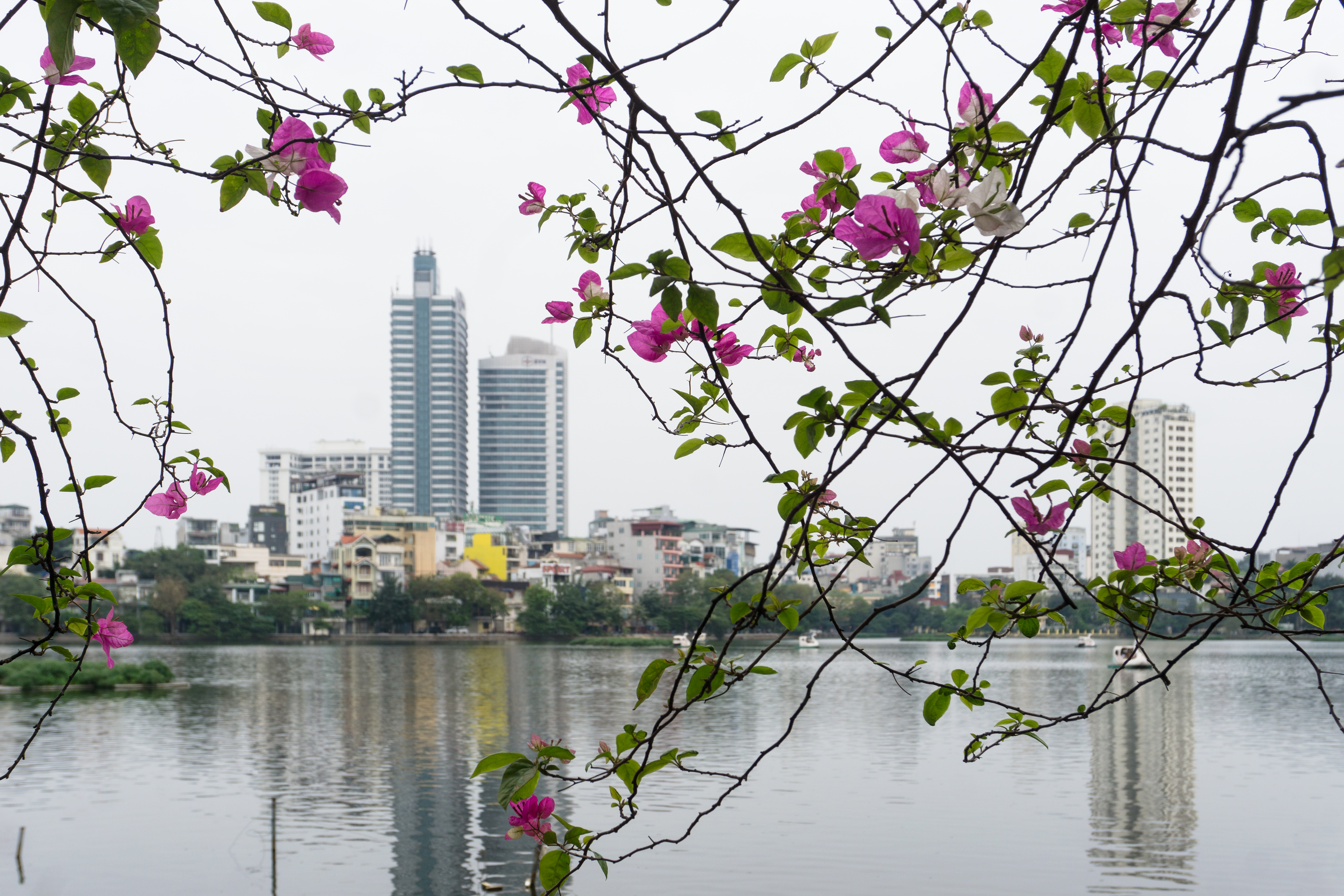
- The EVN Twin Tower headquarters in Hanoi
- Trade name: EVN
- Native name: Tập đoàn Điện lực Việt Nam
- Company type: State owned
- Industry: Electricity
- Founded: 10 October 1997; 28 years ago
- Headquarters: Hanoi, Vietnam
- Key people: Duong Quang Thanh Chairman; Tran Dinh Nhan CEO
- Revenue: US$14.6 billion (2018)
- Owner: Government of Vietnam
- Number of employees: 106,011 (2014)
- Website: www.evn.com.vn

Vietnam Electricity (EVN; Vietnamese: Tập đoàn Điện lực Việt Nam, lit. 'Vietnam Electricity Group') is the national and the sole public power company in Vietnam. It was established by the government of Vietnam as a state-owned company in 1994, and has operated officially as a one-member limited liability company since 2010.

== History ==
In 1994, the Vietnam electricity sector consolidated the electricity generation, transmission and distribution units to establish the Vietnam Electricity Corporation. Also in this year, the 500kV North-South transmission line was put into operation, connecting the power systems of the three regions of North, Central and South into a unified power system for the whole country.

Before 2006, the Vietnam electricity sector operated under a parent-subsidiary model, with the Vietnam Electricity Corporation as the parent company. Then, on June 22, 2006, this corporation was converted into the Vietnam Electricity Group (EVN). On June 25, 2010, the Prime Minister of Vietnam decided to convert the Vietnam Electricity Group model into a single-member limited liability company controlled by the state.

== Subsidiaries ==
- National Power Transmission Corporation
- Power Generation Corporation No. 1
- Power Generation Corporation No. 2
- Power Generation Corporation No. 3
- Northern Power Corporation
- Central Power Corporation
- Southern Power Corporation
- Hanoi City Power Corporation
- Ho Chi Minh City Power Corporation
- National Load Dispatch Center
- Electric Power Trading Company
- Electric Information Centre
- Information Technology Centre

== Criticism ==
EVN is facing various criticisms, notably the lack of clear separation between social responsibility and business responsibility from the Government and EVN itself. For example, providing electricity to remote and island areas by 2023 still faced difficulties due to the lack of clear support policies, leading to challenges in evaluating operational efficiency. EVN's apparatus remains cumbersome and requires restructuring to enhance effectiveness. Although customer service has seen improvements, certain limitations persist. According to a 2022 survey by the Ministry of Industry and Trade, the customer satisfaction rate with EVN's services reached 80%, with 20% remaining unsatisfied. The purchase and dispatch of electricity from power plants outside of EVN lack transparency, causing public controversy. A 2021 report by the State Audit Office of Vietnam pointed out shortcomings in EVN's bidding process for electricity procurement.
