= List of major power stations in Guangxi =

This article lists the major power stations located in Guangxi province.

== Non-renewable ==
=== Coal based ===
Station	Name in Chinese	Coordinates	Capacity (MW)	Operational units	Under construction units
Qinzhou Power Station	钦州电厂	21°42′4″N 108°37′28″E, 21°46′13″N 108°37′17″E	5,840	4×660MW, 2×600MW, 2×1,000MW	
Guoneng Beihai Power Station	国能广投北海电厂	21°32′10″N 109°35′30″E	4,000	4×1,000MW	
Fangchenggang Power Station	防城港电厂	21°35′29″N 108°23′41″E	2,580	2×630MW, 2×660MW	
Hezhou Power Station	贺州电厂	24°44′12″N 111°20′47″E	2,000	2×1,000MW	
Beihai Power Station	北海电厂	21°34′56″N 109°34′52″E	1,920	2×300MW, 2×660MW	
Heshan Power Station	合山电厂	23°49′43″N 108°52′09″E	1,330	2×330MW, 1×670MW	
Laibin Power Station	来宾电厂	23°41′38″N 109°09′52″E	1,320	2×300MW, 2×360MW	
Chongzuo Power Station	崇左电厂	22°29′41″N 107°33′17″E	1,320	2×660MW	
Nanning Power Station	南宁电厂	22°47′19″N 108°56′22″E	1,200	2×600MW	
Guigang Power Station	贵港电厂	23°06′43″N 109°45′57″E	1,200	2×600MW	
Liuzhou Power Station	柳州电厂	24°27′25″N 109°41′39″E	700	2×350MW	
Guidong Hezhou Power Station	桂东电力贺州电厂	24°01′58″N 111°38′54″E	700	2×350MW	
Baise Baikuang Power Station	百色百矿电厂	23°47′17″N 106°48′55″E	700	2×350MW	
Yongfu Power Station	永福电厂	25°06′05″N 110°04′05″E	600	2×300MW	

=== Nuclear ===
Station	Name in Chinese	Coordinates	Capacity (MW)	Operational reactors	Under construction reactors	Reference
Fangchenggang Nuclear Power Plant	防城港核电站	21°40′34″N 108°33′38″E	4,520	2×1,080MW (CPR1000)	2×1,180MW (Hualong-1)	
Bailong Nuclear Power Plant	白龙核电站		2,500		2x1,250MW (CAP1000)	

== Renewable ==
=== Hydroelectric ===
==== Conventional ====
Station	Name in Chinese	Coordinates	River	Capacity (MW)	Dam height (meters)	Status	Units	Reference
Longtan Hydropower Station	龙滩水电站	25°01′38″N 107°02′51″E	Hongshuihe	6,426	216.5	Operational	9×714MW	
Yantan Hydropower Station	岩滩水电站	24°02′26″N 107°30′42″E	Hongshuihe	1,810	110	Operational	4×302.5MW, 2×300MW×	
Datengxia Hydropower Station	大藤峡水电站	23°27′33″N 110°1′55″E	Xijiang	1,600	83.5	Under construction	6×200MW	
Tianshengqiao-II Hydropower Station	天生桥二级水电站	24°57′47″N 105°09′21″E	Nanpanjiang	1,320	58.7	Operational	6×220MW, run-of-the-river	
Tianshengqiao-I Hydropower Station	天生桥一级水电站	24°56′32″N 105°06′21″E	Nanpanjiang	1,200	178	Operational	4×300MW	
Changzhou Hydropower Station	长洲水电站	23°25′12″N 111°12′15″E	Xijiang	630	65	Operational	15×42MW	
Letan Hydropower Station	乐滩水电站	23°58′22″N 108°36′28″E	Hongshuihe	600	63	Operational	4×150MW	
Dahua Hydropower Station	大化水电站	23°51′17″N 108°07′48″E	Hongshuihe	600	78.5	Operational	4×150MW	
Baise Hydropower Station	百色水电站	23°55′34″N 106°27′24″E	Youjiang	540	130	Operational	4×135MW	
Qiaogong Hydropower Station	桥巩水电站	23°37′44″N 108°56′56″E	Hongshuihe	456	63.5	Operational	8×57MW	
Pingban Hydropower Station	平班水电站	24°49′08″N 105°29′21″E	Nanpanjiang	405	66.4	Operational	3×135MW	
Xijin Hydropower Station	西津水电站	24°51′58″N 104°34′48″E	Yujiang	234.4	41	Operational	2×57.2MW, 2×60MW	
Honghua Hydropower Station	红花水电站	24°13′41″N 109°31′52″E	Yujiang	231	53.5	Operational	6×38.5MW	
Bailongtan Hydropower Station	百龙滩水电站	23°51′17″N 108°07′48″E	Hongshuihe	192	28	Operational	6×32MW	

× New expansion of 2×300MW of Yantan Hydropower Station started in 2011.

==== Pumped-storage ====
Station	Name in Chinese	Coordinates	Status	Capacity (MW)	Height difference (meters)	Operational units	Under construction units
Nanning Pumped-storage Hydro Power Station	南宁抽水蓄能电站		UC	1,200	460		4×300MW

== See also ==
- List of power stations in China
