= List of major power stations in Jiangsu province =

This page lists major power stations located in the Jiangsu Province of China.

== Non-renewable ==
=== Coal-based ===
Station	Name in Chinese	Coordinates	Capacity (MW)	Operational units	Under construction units	Reference
Ligang Power Station	利港电厂	31°56′26″N 120°04′33″E	6,040	2×350 MW, 2×370 MW, 4×650 MW	2×1,000 MW	
Sheyanggang Power Station	射阳港电厂	33°49′05″N 120°27′58″E	5,320	2×660 MW, 2×1,000 MW	2×1,000 MW	
Changshu Power Station	常熟电厂	31°45′25″N 120°58′31″E	5,000	4×300 MW, 3×600 MW, 2×1,000 MW		
Lüsigang Power Station	吕四港电厂	32°03′31″N 121°43′34″E	4,640	4×660 MW, 2×1,000 MW		
Taizhou Power Station	泰州电厂	32°11′11″N 119°54′49″E	4,000	4×1,000 MW		
Jurong Power Station	句容电厂	32°11′39″N 119°14′46″E	4,000	4×1,000 MW		
Binhai Power Station	滨海电厂	34°18′26″N 120°14′49″E	4,000	4×1,000 MW		
Taicang Power Station	神华国华太仓电厂	31°39′25″N 121°10′45″E	3,900	2×320 MW, 2×630 MW	2×1,000 MW	
Jianbi Power Station	谏壁电厂	32°10′38″N 119°34′35″E	3,800	6×300 MW, 2×1000 MW		
Nantong Power Station	南通电厂	32°01′59″N 120°46′05″E	3,400	4×350 MW	2×1,000 MW	
Jingjiang Power Station	靖江电厂	32°01′52″N 120°22′56″E	3,320	2×660 MW	2×1,000 MW	
Pengcheng/Tongshan Power Station	彭城/铜山电厂	34°22′40″N 117°10′35″E	3,280	2×1000 MW, 2×340 MW, 2×300 MW		
Changzhou Power Station	常州电厂	31°57′30″N 119°59′33″E	3,260	2×630 MW	2×1,000 MW	
Taicanggang Power Station	国能太仓港电厂	31°35′05″N 121°15′25″E	2,770	2×135 MW, 2×320 MW, 2×330 MW, 2×600 MW		
Xuzhou Power Station	徐州电厂	34°23′10″N 117°15′28″E,	2,660	2×330 MW, 2×1000 MW		
Xinhai Power Station	新海电厂	34°34′40″N 119°07′38″E	2,660	2×1000 MW, 2×330 MW		
Yangzhou No2 Power Station	扬州第二电厂	32°16′04″N 119°25′10″E	2,520	2×600 MW, 2×660 MW		
Jinling Power Station	金陵电厂	32°10′18″N 119°01′07″E	2,060	2×1,030 MW		
Guoxing Shazhou Power Station	国信沙洲电厂		2,000		2×1,000 MW	
Sulong Thermal Power Station	苏龙热电厂	31°55′10″N 120°12′17″E	1,980	2×330 MW	2×660 MW	
Huaren Nanjing Power Station	华润南京电厂	31°56′52″N 118°37′49″E	1,800	2×600 MW, 2×300 MW		
Huaiyin Power Station	淮阴电厂	33°35′43″N 118°57′44″E	1,760	2×220 MW, 4×330 MW		
Zhenjiang Power Station	镇江电厂	32°11′11″N 119°16′25″E	1700	4×125 MW, 2×600 MW		
Suqian Power Station	宿迁电厂	33°50′21″N 118°22′09″E	1,590	2×660 MW, 2×135 MW		
Wangting Power Station	望亭电厂	31°26′40″N 120°26′14″E	1,320	2×660 MW		
Chenjiagang Power Station	陈家港电厂	34°25′26″N 119°47′54″E	1,320	2×660 MW		
Datang Nanjing Power Station	大唐南京发电厂	32°12′46″N 119°12′34″E	1,320	2×660 MW		
Xutang Power Station	徐塘电厂	34°20′55″N 117°55′55″E	1,200	4×300 MW		
Shazhou Power Station	沙洲电厂	31°59′26″N 120°40′52″E	1,200	2×600 MW		
Xuzhou Mining Group Power Station	徐州矿务集团坑口煤矸石综合利用发电厂	34°22′25″N 117°19′40″E	1,200	2×600 MW		
Kanshan Power Station	阚山电厂	34°24′25″N 117°34′38″E	1,200	2×600 MW		
Huaren Jiangsu Nanre Power Station	华润江苏南热电厂	32°12′30″N 118°45′14″E	1,200	2×600 MW		
Banqiao Power Plant	板桥电厂	31.951193°N 118.633301°E	930	2×135 MW and 2×330 MW		
Nanjing Chemical Industry Campus Power Station	南京化学工业园热电厂	32°16′19″N 118°48′59″E	760	2×55 MW, 2×300 MW		
Datun Thermal Power Station	中煤大屯热电工程	32°25′44″N 119°28′35″E	700	2×350 MW		
Huamei Power Station	徐州华美电厂	34°20′23″N 117°06′19″E	700	2×350 MW		
Yangzhou Power Station	扬州电厂	32°25′44″N 119°28′35″E	660	2×330 MW		,
Tianshenggang Power Station	天生港电厂	32°02′05″N 120°45′13″E	660	2×330 MW		
Huaneng Nanjing Power Station	华能南京电厂	32°12′21″N 118°45′11″E	640	2×320 MW		
Sinopec Yizheng Chemical Fiber Power Station	仪征化纤自备电厂	32°16′35″N 119°06′20″E	600	6×100 MW		
Yancheng Power Station	盐城电厂	33°24′00″N 120°07′00″E	560	4×125 MW		
Sinopec Yangzi Petrochemical Power Station	扬子石化分公司热电厂	32°15′10″N 118°47′39″E	360	6×60 MW		

=== Natural gas-based ===
Station	Name in Chinese	Coordinates	Capacity (MW)	Operational units	Under construction units	Reference
Qishuyan Power Station	戚墅堰电厂	31°44′09″N 120°02′14″E	2,170	2×220 MW, 2×350 MW, 2×475 MW		
Wangting Power Station	望亭电厂	31°26′40″N 120°26′14″E	1,750	2×390 MW	2×485 MW	
Zhangjiagang Power Station	张家港电厂	31°53′13″N 120°35′48″E	1,580	2×390 MW, 2×400 MW		
Nantong Gas Power Station	南通电厂	32°01′59″N 120°46′05″E	1,490	3×745 MW		
Zhengjiang Gas Power Station	镇江燃气热电厂	32°07′37″N 119°28′48″E	950		2×475 MW	
Yangzhou Power Station	扬州电厂	32°25′44″N 119°28′35″E	800	2×400 MW		
Kunshan Huadian Power Station	华电昆山燃机热电	31°20′49″N 121°20′29″E	800	2×400 MW		
Jintan Datang Power Station	大唐金坛燃机热电	31°46′24″N 119°36′33″E	800	2×400 MW		
Wuxi Dongya Power Station	无锡东亚电力	31°41′44″N 120°27′59″E	800	2×400 MW		
Jiangyin Gas Power Station	华能江阴燃机热电联产	31°45′32″N 120°23′08″E	800		2×400 MW	
Jinling Power Station	金陵电厂	32°10′18″N 119°01′07″E	780	2×390 MW		
Yizheng Natural Gas Power Station	仪征燃气电厂	32°17′13″N 119°03′18″E	762	3×254 MW		

=== Nuclear ===
Station	Name in Chinese	Coordinates	Capacity installed and Underconstructed (MW)	Operational reactors and (type)	Under construction reactors	Planned reactors
Tianwan Nuclear Power Plant	田湾核电站	34°41′16″N 119°27′36″E	6,360	2×1,060 MW (PWR)	4×1,060 MW (PWR)	2×1,060 MW
Xuwei Nuclear Power Station	徐圩核能供热发电厂		3,000		2×1,200 MW (PWR), 1× 600 MW (HTGR)	

== Renewable ==
=== Hydroelectric ===
==== Pumped-storage ====
Station	Name in Chinese	Coordinates	Capacity (MW)	Height difference (meters)	Status	Operational units	Under construction units
Liyang Pumped Storage Power Station	溧阳抽水蓄能电站	31°14′17″N 119°22′35″E	1,500	259	Operational	6×250 MW	
Jurong Pumped Storage Power Station	句容抽水蓄能电站	32°04′35″N 119°13′35″E	1,350		UC		6×225 MW
Yixing Pumped Storage Power Station	宜兴抽水蓄能电站	31°18′55″N 119°45′37″E	1,000	363	Operational	4×250 MW	
Shahe Pumped Storage Power Station	沙河抽水蓄能电站	31°17′13″N 119°25′47″E	100	97.7	Operational	2×50 MW	

=== Wind ===
Jiangsu is a major wind electricity power base that is developed in China. Its capacity is planned to reach 40-60 GW. By 2010, the installed off-shore and close-shore wind electricity generation capacity was about 1.7 GW, and was expected to reach to 10 GW (3 GW in-land and 7 GW off-shore and close-shore) by 2020.

Station	Name in Chinese	Coordinates	Operational capacity (MW)	Status	Units	Reference
Guanyun Wind Farm	徐州风电场	34°27′52″N 117°25′30″E, 34°24′41″N 117°19′28″E		Operational & expending		
Guanyun Wind Farm	灌云风电场	34°31′24″N 119°41′38″E		Operational & expending		
Xiangshui Wind Power Farm	响水风电场	34°26′38″N 119°56′09″E, 34°23′18″N 120°03′14″E, 34°27′10″N 119°52′05″E	201	Operational & expending	134×1.5 MW	
Binhai Wind Farm	射阳风电场	34°07′52″N 120°18′40″E, 34°10′41″N 120°17′37″E, 34°12′28″N 120°17′28″E, 34°21′38″N 120°04′27″E,		Operational & expending		
Sheyang Wind Farm	射阳风电场	33°53′49″N 120°22′26″E, 34°05′55″N 120°18′47″E		Operational & expending		
Dafeng Wind Power Farm	大丰风电场	32°58′59″N 120°54′03″E, 33°05′03″N 120°51′15″E, 33°10′33″N 120°48′43″E	200	Operational & expending		
Dongtai Wind Power Farm	东台风电场	32°47′48″N 120°54′18″E, 32°38′58″N 120°55′35″E,	200	Operational & expending		
Rudong Wind Power Farm	如东风电场	32°37′09″N 121°0′19″E, 32°31′40″N 121°04′52″E, 32°32′59″N 121°07′46″E, 32°33′45″N 121°16′44″E, 32°20′11″N 121°24′11″E, 32°13′35″N 121°26′56″E	4220	Operational & expending		
Qidong Wind Power Farm	启东风电场	31°49′41″N 121°52′24″E, 31°57′25″N 121°48′11″E		Operational & expending		

=== Solar ===
Station	Name in Chinese	Coordinates	Operational capacity (MW)	Status	Reference
Jiawang Photovoltaic Power Farm	徐州贾汪光伏电站	34°24′25″N 117°19′43″E		Operational & expending	
Jinhu Photovoltaic Power Farm	洪泽光伏电站	33°13′31″N 119°04′57″E		Operational & expending	
Jinhu Photovoltaic Power Farm	金湖光伏电站	33°08′06″N 119°15′50″E, 33°10′31″N 119°12′15″E, 32°56′51″N 119°15′02″E		Operational & expending	
Gaoyou Photovoltaic Power Farm	高邮光伏电站	32°58′24″N 119°36′25″E, 32°58′32″N 119°37′12″E, 32°57′55″N 119°40′22″E		Operational & expending	
Xinghua Photovoltaic Power Farm	兴化光伏电站	33°02′37″N 119°44′06″E, 33°08′26″N 119°43′36″E		Operational & expending	
Jianhu Photovoltaic Power Farm	建湖光伏电站	33°19′51″N 119°45′31″E, 33°29′13″N 119°40′29″E, 33°29′36″N 119°41′36″E		Operational & expending	
Taizhou Photovoltaic Power Farm	泰州光伏电站	32°34′23″N 119°52′32″E, 32°33′49″N 119°52′20″E		Operational & expending	
Jintan Photovoltaic Power Farm	金坛光伏电站	31°50′06″N 119°30′57″E		Operational & expending	
Liyang Photovoltaic Power Farm	溧阳光伏电站	31°31′06″N 119°27′47″E		Operational	
Haizhou Photovoltaic Power Farm	连云港海州光伏电站	34°40′20″N 119°00′55″E		Operational & expending	
Xiangshui Photovoltaic Power Farm	响水滩涂光伏电站	34°24′07″N 119°57′03″E, 34°22′13″N 120°04′04″E, 34°26′50″N 119°51′39″E		Operational & expending	
Binhai Photovoltaic Power Farm	滨海滩涂光伏电站	34°07′32″N 120°18′00″E		Operational & expending	
Sheyang Photovoltaic Power Farm	射阳滩涂光伏电站	33°49′32″N 120°26′42″E		Operational & expending	
Dafeng Photovoltaic Power Farm	大丰滩涂光伏电站	33°07′18″N 120°49′47″E		Operational & expending	
Dongtai Photovoltaic Power Farm	东台滩涂光伏国家级风电光电互补产业基地	32°46′17″N 120°55′13″E, 32°38′40″N 120°57′18″E, 32°38′37″N 120°54′44″E, 32°31′30″N 121°05′05″E		Operational & expending	

== See also ==
- List of power stations in China
