= List of major power stations in Guangdong =

This page lists the major power stations located in Guangdong Province.

== Non-renewable ==
=== Coal ===
Station	Name in Chinese	Coordinates	Capacity (MW)	Operational units	Under construction units
Haimen Power Station	海门电厂	23°11′17″N 116°39′14″E	6,120	4×1030MW	2×1,000MW
Huilai Power Station	惠来电厂	23°00′20″N 116°32′48″E	5,200	2×600MW, 4×1000MW	
Sanbaimen Power Station	大唐潮州电厂	23°33′58″N 117°05′49″E	5,200	2×600MW, 2×1000MW	2×1,000MW
Guohua Taishan Power Station	台山电厂	21°51′57″N 112°55′02″E	5,000	5×600MW, 2×1000MW	
Yangxi Power Station	阳西电厂	21°32′15″N 111°40′13″E	5,000	2×600MW, 2×660MW, 2×1,240MW	
Shanwei Power Station	汕尾电厂	22°42′21″N 115°33′17″E	4,520	2×600MW, 2×660MW	2×1,000MW
Bohe Power Station	博贺电厂	21°26′34″N 111°17′09″E	4,000	4×1,000MW	
Haifeng Power Station	海丰电厂	22°45′28″N 115°02′32″E	4,000	2×1000MW	2×1,000MW
Jiahuwan Power Station	甲湖湾电厂	22°49′57″N 115°59′10″E	4,000	2×1,000MW	2×1000MW
Qingyuan Guoneng Power Station	国能清远电厂	24°24′57″N 113°32′20″E	4,000		4×1,000MW
Shajiao Power Station	沙角电厂	22°44′50″N 113°40′39″E	3,880	3×210MW, 2×300MW, 2×350MW, 3×660MW	
Huadian Shantou Power Station	华电汕头电厂	23°09′53″N 116°38′26″E	3,320	2×660MW	2×1,000MW
Heyuan Power Station	河源电厂	23°34′02″N 114°38′25″E	3,200	2×600MW, 2×1000MW	
Dapu Power Station	大埔电厂	24°24′14″N 116°35′13″E	3,200	2×600MW, 2×1,000MW	
Zhuhai Power Station	珠海电厂	21°58′05″N 113°10′53″E	2,600	2×700MW, 2×600MW	
Zhanjiang Power Station	湛江电厂	21°18′35″N 110°24′34″E	2,400	4×300MW, 2×600MW	
Zhujiang Power Station	珠江电厂	22°48′51″N 113°34′04″E	2,400	4×300MW	2×600MW
Pinghai Power Station	平海电厂	22°36′32″N 114°44′34″E	2,060	2×1,030MW	
Leizhou Power Station	雷州电厂	20°30′34″N 109°49′40″E	2,000	2×1,000MW	
Qianzhan Power Station	前詹电厂		2,000		2×1,000MW
Shaoguan Yuedian Power Station	粤电韶关电厂	24°35′03″N 113°35′00″E	1,860	2×330MW, 2×600MW	
Shenzhen Mawan Power Station	深圳妈湾电厂	22°28′54″N 113°52′19″E	1,800	6×300MW	
Huaren Xijiang Power Station	华润西江电厂	23°07′20″N 112°16′43″E	1,320	2×660MW	
Shantou Power Station	汕头电厂	23°19′32″N 116°44′10″E	1,200	2×300MW, 1×600MW	
Hengyi Power Station	恒益电厂	23°00′59″N 112°50′26″E	1,200	2×600MW	
Donghai Power Station	京信东海电厂	21°4′36″N 110°25′35″E	1,200		2×600MW
Maoming Power Station	茂名电厂	21°40′32″N 110°52′44″E	1,120	1×220MW, 1×300MW, 1×600MW	
Nanhai 1st Power Station	南海发电一厂	22°53′06″N 112°55′01″E	1,000	2×200MW, 2×300MW	
Zhaoqing Power Station	肇庆热电厂	23°18′3″N 112°51′20″E	700	2×350MW	
BaoSteel Zhanjiang Power Station	宝钢湛江公司自备电厂	21°04′09″N 110°29′38″E	700	2×350MW	
Nanxiong Thermal Power Station	南雄电厂	25°08′45″N 114°17′26″E	700	2×350MW	
Guoyue Shaoguan Power Station	国粤韶关电厂	24°56′41″N 113°32′55″E	700	2×350MW	
Huizhou Power Station	惠州电厂	22°45′12″N 114°37′37″E	660	2×330MW	
Guangzhou Huarun Thermal Power Station	广州华润热电厂	22°51′40″N 113°31′21″E	660	2×330MW	
Hengyun Power Station	恒运电厂	23°03′50″N 113°29′59″E	600	2×300MW	
Yunfu Power Station	云浮电厂	22°57′58″N 112°06′27″E	600	2×300MW	

=== Gas ===
Station	Name in Chinese	Coordinates	Capacity (MW)	Operational units	Under construction units
Shenzhen East Power Station	深圳能源集团东部电厂	22°34′28″N 114°26′34″E	2,570	3×390MW, 2×700MW	
Huizhou LNG Power Station	惠州天然气发电厂	22°45′34″N 114°36′53″E	2,550	3×390MW, 3×460MW	
Dongguan Ningzhou Power Station	东莞宁洲燃气电厂	22°47′05″N 113°42′38″E	2,484	3×828MW	
Zhongshan Jiaming Hengmen Power Station	中山嘉明横门电厂	22°34′10″N 113°34′30″E	2,160	2×390MW, 3×460MW	
Dongguan Huaneng Power Station	华能东莞燃机热电	22°58′59″N 114°06′09″E	1,942	2×472.52MW, 2×498.48MW	
Zhujiang Power Station	珠江电厂	22°48′51″N 113°34′04″E	1,900	2×350MW	2×600MW
Yuhua Huangpu Power Station	粤华黄埔电厂	23°04′44″N 113°30′02″E	1,513	2×423MW, 1×667MW	
Zhongshan Sanjiao Power Station	粤电中山三角天然气热电冷联产项目	22°42′47″N 113°26′26″E	1,380	3×460MW	
Hongwan Power Station	珠海深能洪湾电力	22°10′30″N 113°28′23″E	1,356	2×180MW, 2×498MW	
Dongguan Zhongdian Power Station	东莞中电新能源热电	22°58′35″N 113°49′44″E	1,300	2×180MW, 2×470MW	
Zengcheng Power Station	华电福新广州能源电厂	23°10′17″N 113°40′37″E	1,300	2×650MW	
Datang Baocang Power Station	深圳大唐宝昌燃气发电	22°42′27″N 114°01′37″E	1,290	2×180MW, 2×460MW	
Shenzhen Qianwan Power Station	深圳前湾燃机电厂	22°30′29″N 113°50′58″E	1,170	3×390MW	
Huadian Huizhou Dongjiang Power Station	华电惠州东江燃机热电厂	23°6′33″N 114°34′15″E	1,070	2×535MW	
Dongguan Zhangyang Power Station	东莞深能源樟洋电力	22°53′15″N 114°05′39″E	1,040	2×180MW, 2×390MW	
Guoneng Zhaoqing Power Station	国家能源集团肇庆电厂	23°18′9″N 112°51′23″E	1,000	2×500MW	
Guoneng Huizhou Power Station	国家能源集团惠州电厂	22°45′10″N 114°37′38″E	1,000	2×500MW	
Jieyang Dananhai Natural Gas Thermal Power Station	粤电力揭阳大南海天然气热电联产项目	22°56′53″N 116°12′51″E	960		2×480MW
Gaobu Power Station	高埗电厂燃气热电联产	23°7′37″N 113°45′16″E	940		2×470MW
Zhuhai Yuhai Power Station	珠海钰海天然气热电联产	22°04′30″N 113°15′18″E	930	2×465MW	
CNOOC Zhuhai Power Station	中海油珠海电厂	21°59′51″N 113°10′50″E	920	2×460MW	
Dongguan Zhongtang Power Station	东莞中堂燃气热电联产	23°06′50″N 113°40′04″E	920	2×460MW	
Huadu Thermal Power Station	粤电广州花都热电联产项目	23°21′47″N 113°05′26″E	920	2×460MW	
Huadian Qingyuan Power Station	华电清远经济合作区热电联产	24°19′26″N 113°23′52″E	920		2×460MW
Zhaoqing Dinghu Power Station	肇庆鼎湖天然气热电联产	23°11′27″N 112°45′11″E	920	2×460MW	
Hengyun Gas Thermal Power Station	恒运热电联产电厂	23°03′50″N 113°29′59″E	920	2×460MW	
Sihui Power Station	中电四会电厂	23°18′56″N 112°47′08″E	800	2×400MW	
Datang Foshan Thermal Power Station	大唐国际佛山热电冷联产项目	22°54′27″N 112°48′49″E	800	2×400MW	
Hengqin Thermal Power Station	珠海横琴热电厂	22°07′38″N 113°27′59″E	780	2×390MW	
Xinhui Power Station	粤电新会电厂	22°15′14″N 113°03′59″E	780	2×390MW	
CNOOC Shenzhen Power Station	中海油深圳电厂	22°33′27″N 114°29′30″E	595	1×78MW, 1×157MW, 2×183MW	
Nanshan Power Station	南山热电厂	22°30′45″N 113°53′33″E	549	3×183MW	
Zhongshan Minzhong Thermal Power Station	中山民众天然气热电冷联产工程	22°40′22″N 113°29′48″E	538	2×269MW	
Fengda Power Station	惠州深能源丰达电力	22°58′56″N 114°29′19″E	360	2×180MW	

=== Nuclear ===
Station	Name in Chinese	Coordinates	Capacity(MW)	Operational reactors and (type)	Under construction reactors	Planned reactors
Yangjiang Nuclear Power Plant	阳江核电站	21°42′35″N 112°15′38″E	5,400	5×1080MW (PWR)	1×1080MW (PWR)	
Ling'ao Nuclear Power Plant	岭澳核电站	22°36′26″N 114°33′14″E	4,140	2×990MW (PWR), 2×1080MW (PWR)		2×1000MW
Taishan Nuclear Power Plant	台山核电站	21°54′34″N 112°58′45″E	3,500	2×1750MW (PWR, CEPR)		4×1750MW
Lianjiang Nuclear Power Plant	廉江核电站	21°33′26″N 109°48′30″E	2,500		2×1250MW (CAP1000)	
Daya Bay Nuclear Power Plant	大亚湾核电站	22°35′52″N 114°32′37″E	1,800	2×900MW (PWR)		
Lufeng Nuclear Power Plant	陆丰核电站	22°45′00″N 115°49′16″E				2×1000MW
Taipingling Nuclear Power Plant	太平岭核电站	22°41′45″N 114°59′00″E	2,232		2×1116 MW	4

== Renewable ==
=== Hydroelectric ===
==== Conventional ====
Station	Name in Chinese	Coordinates	Capacity (MW)	Operational units	Dam height (meters)	Under construction units
Xinfengjiang Hydro Power Station	新丰江水电站	23°43′38″N 114°38′58″E	292.5	1×75MW, 3×72.5MW	105	
Qingxi Hydro Power Station	青溪水电站	24°33′42″N 116°37′05″E	144	4×36MW	51	
Feilaixia Hydro Power Station	飞来峡水电站	23°48′09″N 113°15′22″E	140	4×35MW	52.3	

==== Pumped-storage ====
Station	Name in Chinese	Coordinates	Capacity (MW)	Height difference (meters)	Operational units	Under construction units
Huizhou Pumped Storage Power Station	惠州抽水蓄能电站	23°16′08″N 114°18′48″E	2,400	532	8×300MW	
Guangdong Pumped Storage Power Station	广州抽水蓄能电站	23°45′55″N 113°57′15″E	2,400	500	8×300MW	
Meizhou Pumped-storage Hydro Power Station	梅州抽水蓄能电站	23°23′13″N 115°29′40″E	2,400		4×300MW	4×300MW
Yangjiang Pumped-storage Hydro Power Station	阳江抽水蓄能电站	21°53′25″N 111°22′26″E	2,400		4×300MW	4×300MW
Qingyuan Pumped Storage Power Station	清远抽水蓄能电站	23°44′29″N 112°51′43″E	1,280		4×320MW	
Shenzhen Pumped Storage Power Station	深圳抽水蓄能电站	22°39′16″N 114°15′22″E	1,200		4×300MW	
Yunfu Shuiyuanshan Pumped Storage Power Station	云浮水源山抽水蓄能电站		1,200			4×300MW
Zhaoqing Langjiang Pumped Storage Power Station	肇庆浪江抽水蓄能电站		1,200			4×300MW
Dianbai Pumped Storage Power Station	电白抽水蓄能电站		1,200			4×300MW

=== Wind ===
Station	Name in Chinese	Coordinates	Capacity installed and under construction (MW)	Planned capacity (MW)
Huilai	惠来风电场	22°58′59″N 116°30′31″E	142.8	
Nan'ao	南澳风电场	23°25′09″N 117°07′53″E	178.64	
Yangjiang Hailing Island	阳江海陵岛风电场		22.1	
Shanwei	汕尾风电场		16.5	
Lufeng	陆丰风电场		20.4	
Zhuhai	珠海风电场		15	
Xuwen	徐闻风电场		1.5	
Taishan	台山风电场		85	
Lufeng Offshore	陆丰海上风电场			1250

== See also ==
- List of power stations in China
