= List of power stations in South Korea =

The following page lists power stations in South Korea.

== Non-renewable ==
=== Coal ===
All power station lists are based on the 7th Basic Electricity Supply Plan(2015)

Station	Coordinates	Capacity (MW)	Units	Completion	Fuel type	Notes
Boryeong Power Station		3,000	6		BIT coal	
Dangjin Power Station		6,040	10		BIT coal	
Hadong Power Station		4,000	8		BIT coal	
Samchonpo Power Station		2,120	4		BIT coal	
Taean Power Station		6,100	10		BIT coal	
Yeongheung Power Station		5,080	6		BIT coal	
->Yeongheung unit 1		800		12 Jul 2004	BIT coal	
->Yeongheung unit 2		800		28 Nov 2004	BIT coal	
->Yeongheung unit 3		870		30 Jun 2008	BIT coal	
->Yeongheung unit 4		870		31 Dec 2008	BIT coal	
->Yeongheung unit 5		870		10 Jun 2014	BIT coal	
->Yeongheung unit 6		870		5 Nov 2014	BIT coal	
Yeosu Power Station		679	2		BIT coal	
Yeongdong Power Station		325	2		ANTH coal	Retired
Donghae Power Station		1100	2		ANTH coal	
Shin Boryung Power Station		2,000	2		BIT coal	
Samcheok Green Power		2,000	2		BIT coal	
Bukpyung Power Station		1,190	2		BIT coal	
Goseong HI Power Station		2,080	2	2021	BIT coal	
->Goseong HI unit 1		1,040		2021	BIT coal	
->Goseong HI unit 2		1,040		Oct 2021	BIT coal	
Samcheok Pos Power		2,100	2	2024	BIT coal	
Gangneung Anin Station		2,080	2	2022	BIT coal	
->Gangneung Ani unit 1		1,040		Dec 2021	BIT coal	
->Gangneung Ani unit 2		1,040		Jun 2022	BIT coal	
Shin Seocheon Power Station		1,000	1	Mar 2020	BIT coal	

=== Fuel oil ===
All power stations with at least 500 MW nameplate capacity are listed.

Station	Community	Coordinates	Capacity (MW)	Notes
Pyeongtaek Power Station			1,400	
Ulsan Power Station			1,800	
Yeosu Power Station			528	

=== Natural gas ===
All power stations with at least 1,000 MW nameplate capacity are listed.

Station	Community	Coordinates	Capacity (MW)	Type
Boryeong Power Station			1,200	CCGT
Busan Power Station			1,800	CCGT
Incheon Power Station			1,012	CCGT
Seoincheon Power Station			1,800	CCGT
Seoul Power Station			1,537	
Shinincheon Power Station			1,800	CCGT
Seoincheon Power Station			1,800	CCGT
Dangjin Eco Ulsan Power Station			1,000	CCGT
Ulsan Power Station			1,200	CCGT

=== Nuclear ===
All power stations are listed.

Station	Community	Coordinates	Capacity (MW)	Unit	Commissioning	Notes
Kori Nuclear Power Plant		35.319904°N 129.290053°E	6,537			
-> Kori #1			587	1	29 April 1978	
-> Kori #2			650	2	25 July 1983	
-> Kori #3			950	3	30 September 1985	
-> Kori #4			950	4	29 April 1986	
-> Shin Kori #1			1,000	5	28 February 2011	
-> Shin Kori #2			1,000	6	20 July 2012	
-> Shin Kori #3			1,400	7	20 December 2016	
-> Shin Kori #4			1,400	8	September 2019	
Hanul Nuclear Power Plant		37°05′34″N 129°23′01″E	5,928			
-> Hanul #1			950	1	10 September 1988	
-> Hanul #2			950	2	30 September 1989	
-> Hanul #3			1000	3	11 August 1998	
-> Hanul #4			1000	4	31 December 1999	
-> Hanul #5			1000	5	29 July 2004	
-> Hanul #6			1000	6	22 April 2005	
-> Shin Hanul #1			1,340	7	November 2018 exp.	Construction
-> Shin Hanul #2			1,340	8	November 2019 exp.	Construction
-> Shin Hanul #3			1,340	9	December 2022 exp.	Construction
-> Shin Hanul #4			1,340	10	December 2023 exp.	Construction
Hanbit Nuclear Power Plant		35°24′54″N 126°25′26″E	5,875			
-> Hanbit #1			950	1	25 August 1986	
-> Hanbit #2			950	2	10 June 1987	
-> Hanbit #3			1,000	3	31 March 1995	
-> Hanbit #4			1,000	4	1 January 1996	
-> Hanbit #5			1,000	5	21 May 2002	
-> Hanbit #6			1,000	6	24 December 2002	
Wolseong Nuclear Power Plant		35°43′0″N 129°28′40″E	4,598			
-> Wolseong #1			657	1	22 April 1983	
-> Wolseong #2			647	2	1 July 1997	
-> Wolseong #3			651	3	1 July 1998	
-> Wolseong #4			653	4	1 October 1999	
-> Shin wolseong #1			997	5	31 July 2012	
-> Shin wolseong #2			993	6	24 July 2015	

== Renewable ==
=== Hydroelectric ===
Power stations with at least 50 MW nameplate capacity are listed.

Station	Community	Coordinates	Capacity (MW)	PS	Notes
Andong Dam	Andong	36°35′05″N 128°46′26″E	80	Yes	
Cheongpyong PS			400	Yes	
Cheongsong PS			600	Yes	
Chungju Dam	Chungju	37°00′22″N 127°59′33″E	400	No	
Daecheong Dam	Daejeon	36°28′39″N 127°28′51″E	90	No	
Hapcheon HPS			100	No	
Hwacheon Dam	Hwacheon	38°07′02″N 127°46′44″E	108	No	
Imha Dam	Andong	36°32′15″N 128°53′00″E	50	No	
Muju PS			600	Yes	
Paldang HPS			120	No	
Sancheong PS			700	Yes	
Samnangjin PS			600	Yes	
Soyanggang Dam	Chuncheon	37°56′44″N 128°48′52″E	200	No	
Yangyang PS	Yangyang	38°00′37″N 128°32′34″E	1,000	Yes	
Yecheon PS			800	Yes	Under construction

=== Tidal ===
Station	Community	Coordinates	Capacity (MW)	Notes
Garorim Bay Tidal Power Station			520	Proposed
Incheon Tidal Power Station		37°29′30″N 126°20′15″E	1,320	Under construction (2017)
Sihwa Lake Tidal Power Station			254	
Uldolmok Tidal Power Station	Uldolmok	34°34′06″N 126°18′28″E	1.5	

=== Wind ===
Power stations with at least 10 MW nameplate capacity are listed.

Station	Community	Coordinates	Capacity (MW)	Turbines
Hankyeong Wind Farm			21	9
Kangwon Wind Farm			98	
Seongsan Wind Farm			12	6
Youngduk Wind Farm			39.6	24

== See also ==
- List of largest power stations in the world
