= List of coal-fired power stations =

The following page lists 84 of the coal-fired power stations (including lignite-fired) that are 3,000 MW or larger net capacity, which are operational or under construction. If a station also has units which do not burn coal, only coal-fired capacity is listed. Those power stations that are smaller than 3,000 MW, and those that are only at a planning/proposal stage may be found in regional lists, listed at the end of the page.

== Coal power stations ==
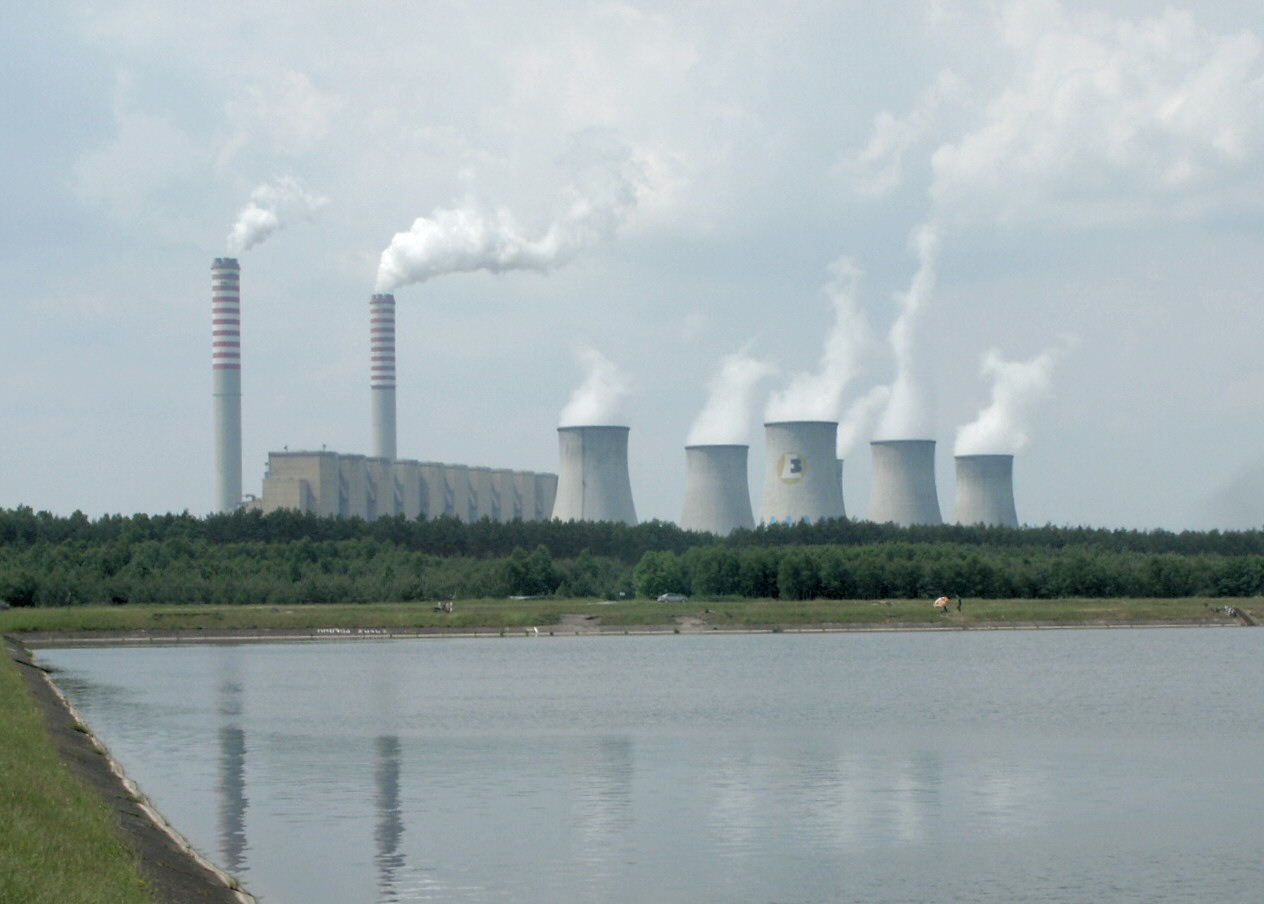
Belchatow Power Station

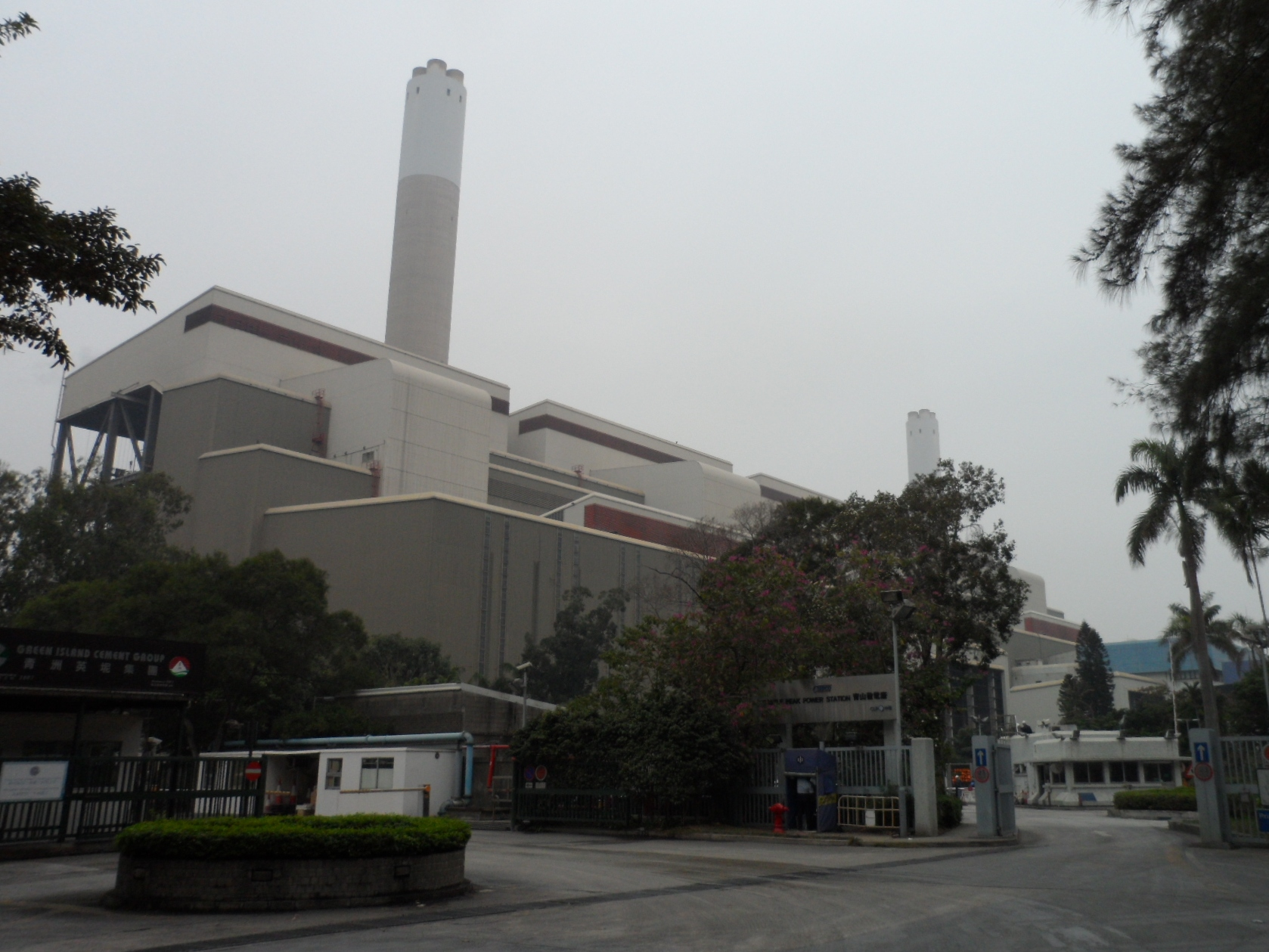
Castle Peak Power Station

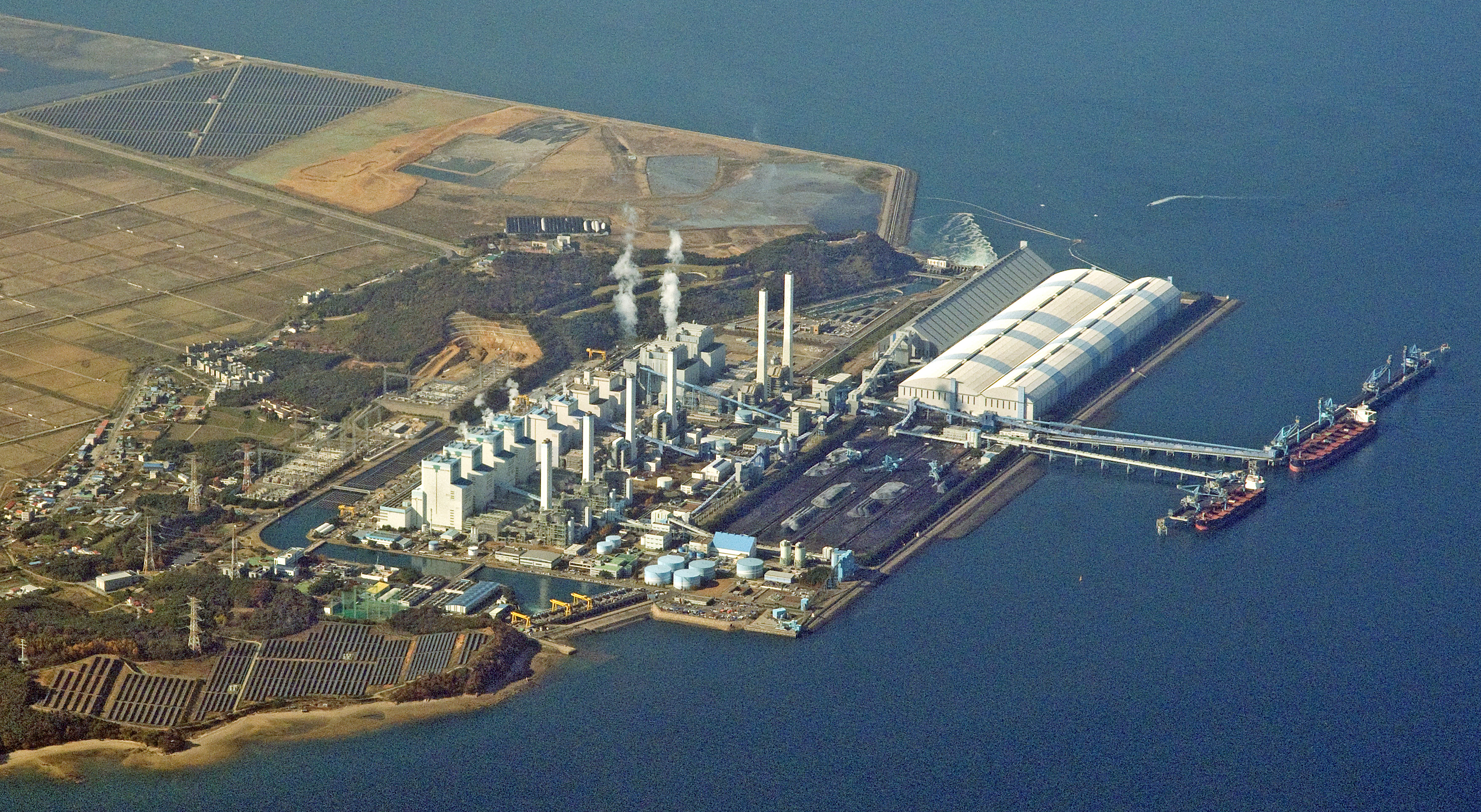
Dangjin Power Station

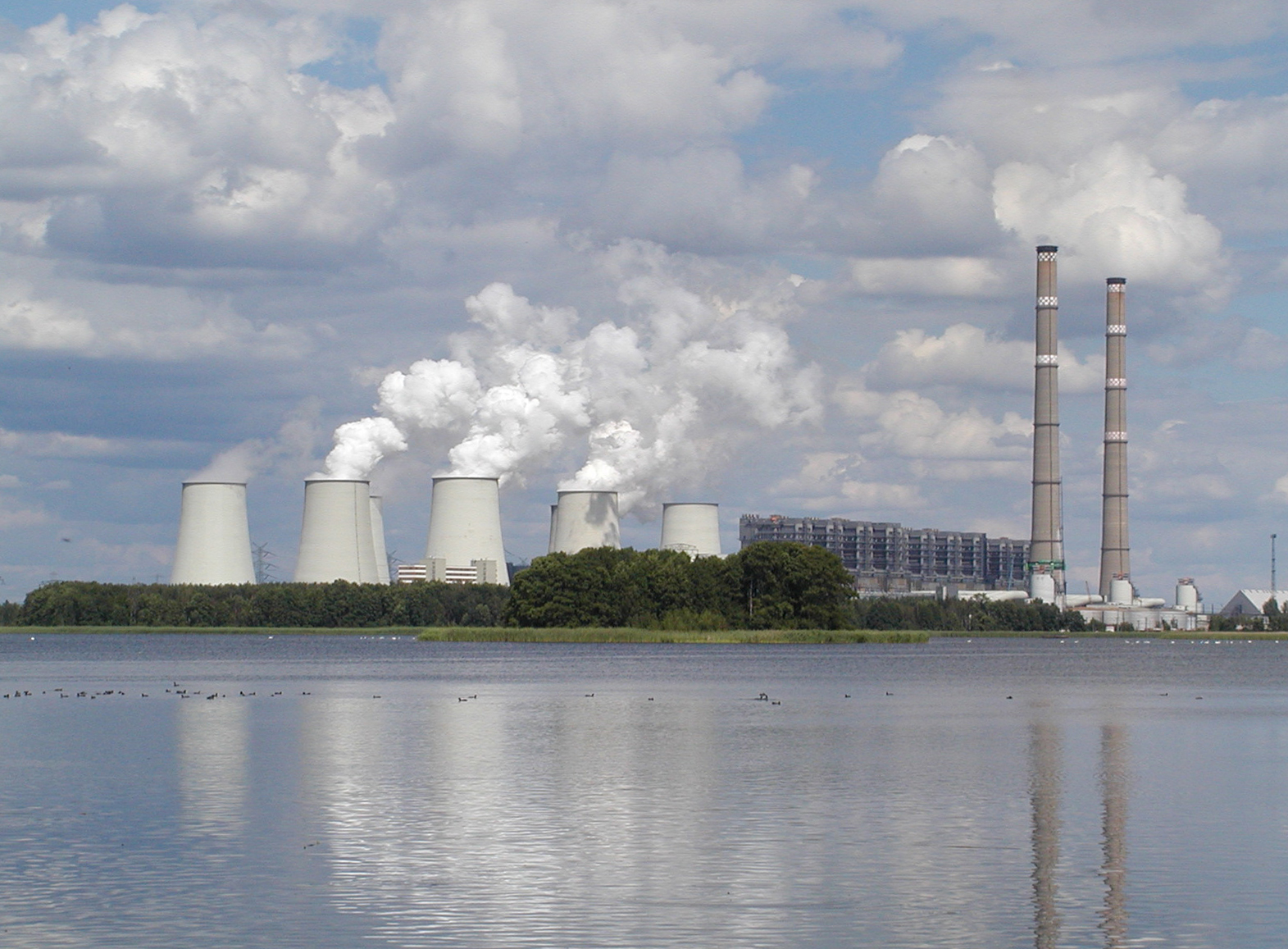
Jänschwalde Power Station

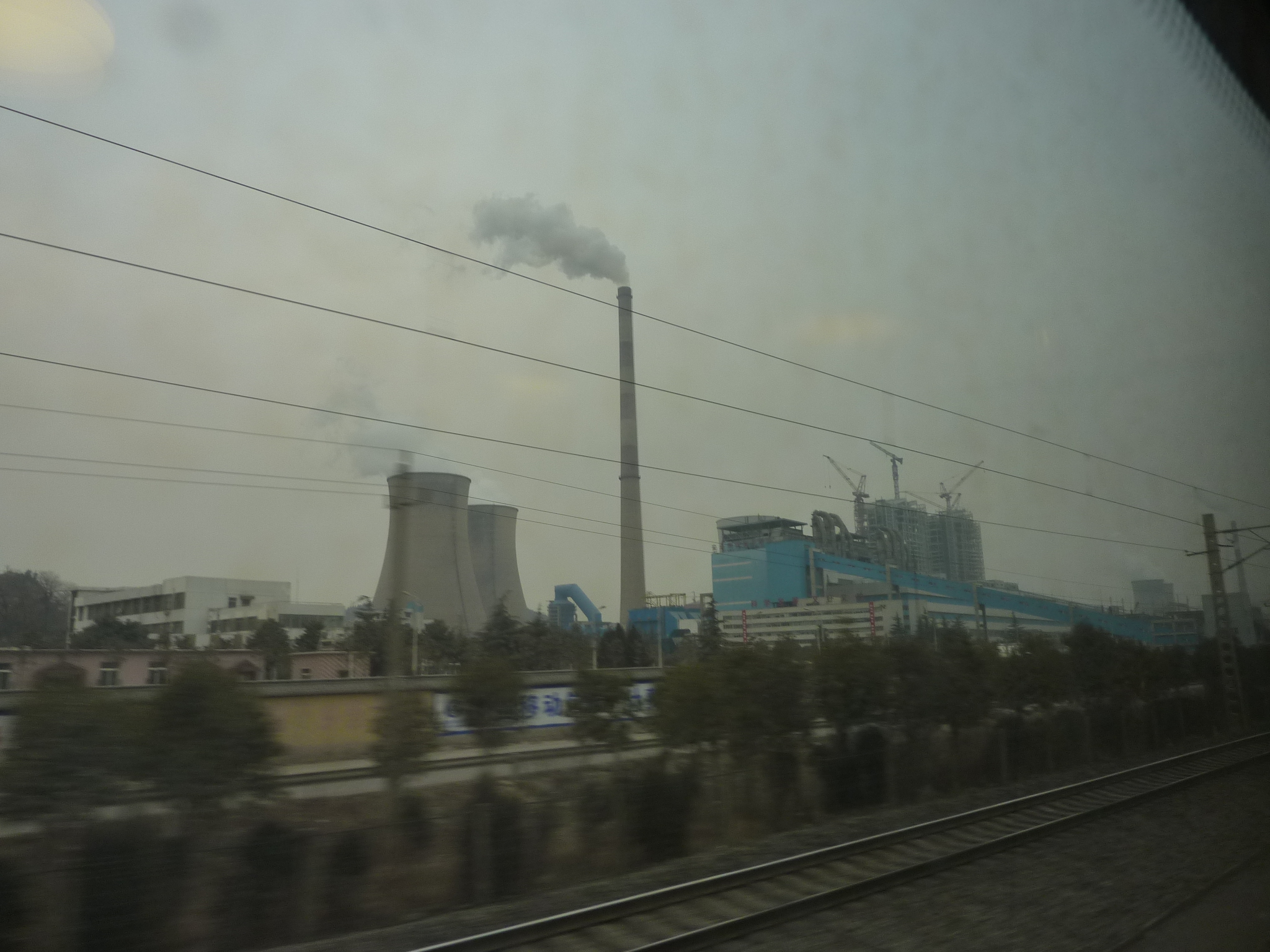
Pengcheng Power Station

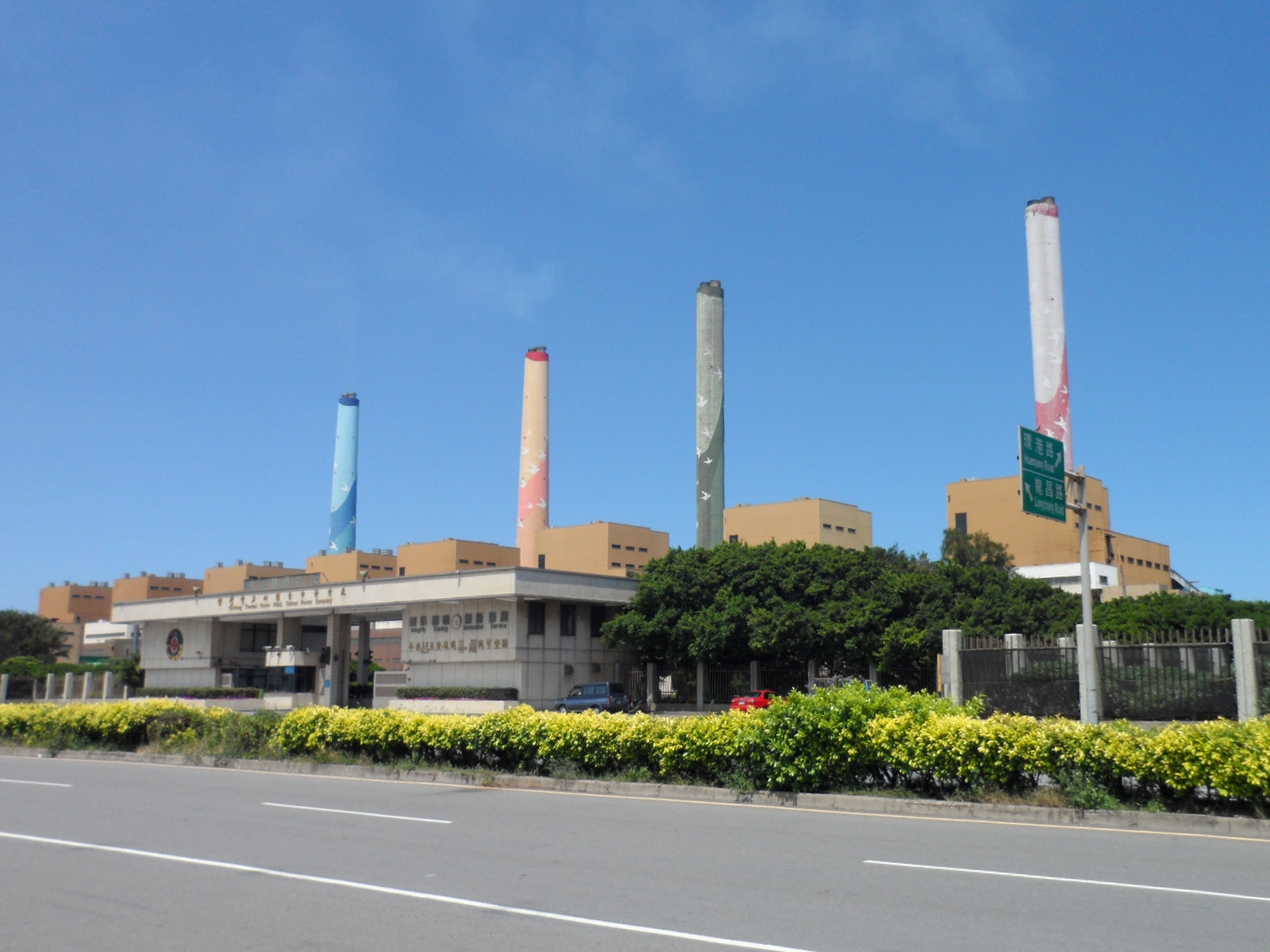
Taichung Power Station

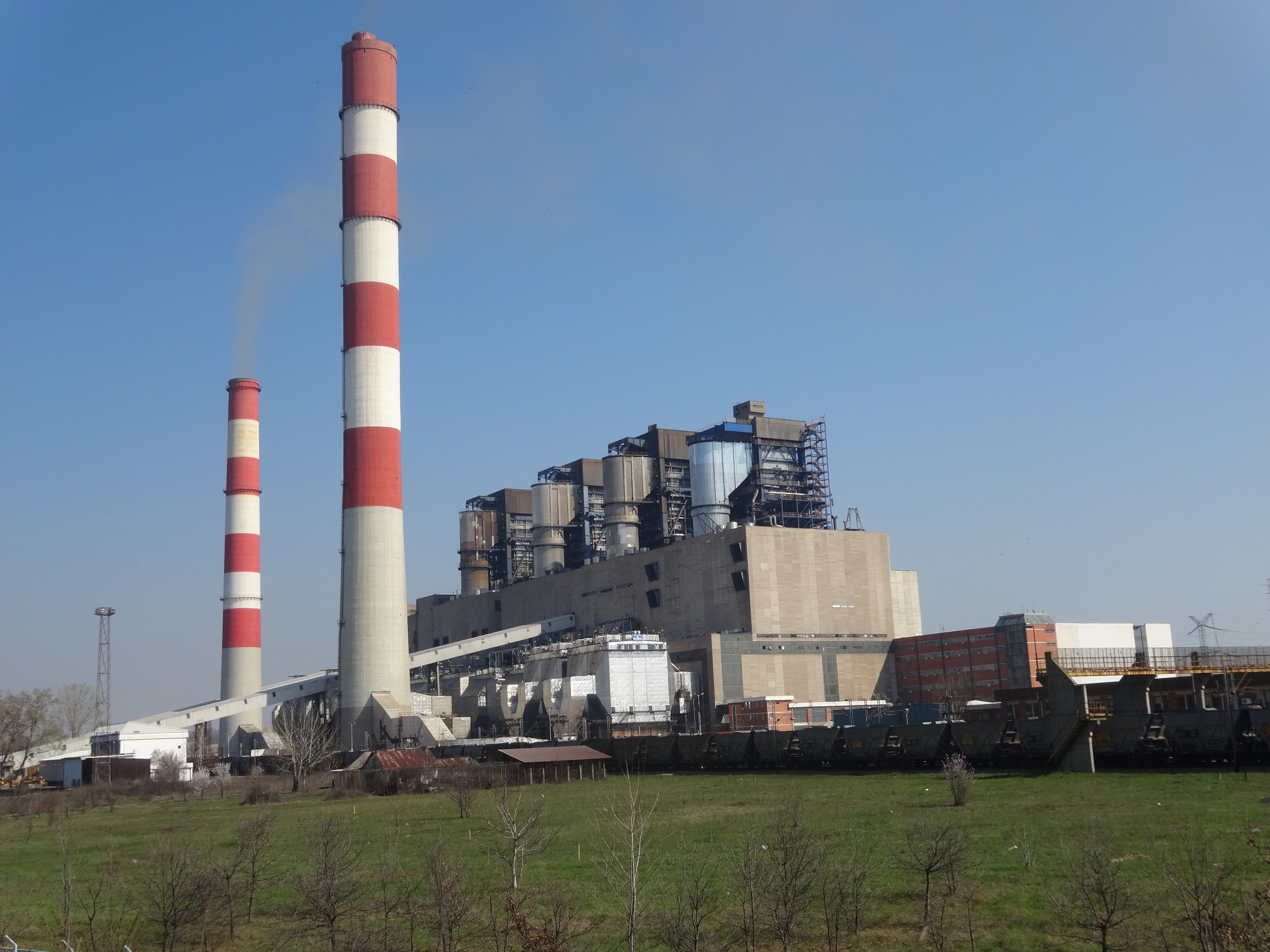
Tesla Power Station

Station	Country	Capacity in MW	Location
Anpara Thermal Power Station	India	3,850	24°12′11″N 82°47′18″E
Bełchatów Power Station	Poland	5,102	51°15′59″N 19°19′50″E
Boryeong Power Station	South Korea	4,000	36°24′06″N 126°29′30″E
Bowen Power Station	United States	3,499	34°07′23″N 84°55′13″W
Castle Peak Power Station	Hong Kong	4,108	22°22′32″N 113°55′12″E
Chandrapur Super Thermal Power Station	India	3,340	20°00′24″N 79°17′21″E
Changshu Power Station	China	3,000	31°45′25″N 120°58′31″E
Dalate Power Station	China	3,180	40°22′00″N 109°59′45″E
Dangjin	South Korea	6,040	37°03′19″N 126°30′35″E
Datong 2nd Power Station	China	3,720	40°01′44″N 113°17′37″E
Duvha Power Station	South Africa	3,600	25°57′50″S 29°20′14″E
Duyên Hải Power Station	Vietnam	3,689	09°35′00″N 106°31′38″E
Ekibastuz GRES-1	Kazakhstan	4,000	51°53′12″N 75°22′31″E
Gibson Generating Station	United States	3,132	38°22′19″N 87°46′02″W
Guodian Beilun Power Station	China	7,340	29°56′37″N 121°48′57″E
Guohua Taishan Power Station	China	5,000	21°51′52″N 112°55′26″E
Hadong Power Station	South Korea	4,000	34°57′02″N 127°49′19″E
Haimen Power Station	China	4,144	23°11′17″N 116°39′14″E
Hanchuan Power Station	China	3,200	30°39′22″N 113°55′23″E
Huadian Laizhou Power Station	China	4,078	37°25′55″N 120°01′02″E
Hekinan Power Station	Japan	4,100	34°50′7″N 136°57′43″E
Houshi Power Station	China	4,200	24°18′16″N 118°07′33″E
Hsinta Power Plant	Taiwan	4,326	22°51′23″N 120°11′49″E
Huilai Power Station	China	3,200	23°00′20″N 112°36′40″E
Jänschwalde Power Station	Germany	3,000	51°50′05″N 14°27′37″E
Jiaxing Power Station	China	6,030	30°37′46″N 121°8′49″E
Jindal Tamnar Thermal Power Plant	India	3,400	22°05′54″N 83°26′19″E
Jurong power station	China	4000	32°11′45″N 119°14′59″E
Kendal Power Station	South Africa	4,116	26°05′24″S 28°58′17″E
Kozienice Power Station	Poland	4,016	51°40′0″N 21°28′0″E
Kriel Power Station	South Africa	3,000	26°15′15″S 29°10′46″E
Kusile Power Station	South Africa	4,000	25°54′59″S 28°55′02″E
Lamma Power Station	Hong Kong	3,755	25°04′40″N 121°31′26″E
Lethabo Power Station	South Africa	3,708	26°44′31″S 27°58′39″E
Ligang Power Station	China	3,840	31°56′26″N 120°04′33″E
Lingwu Power Station	China	3,200	38°08′54″N 106°20′45″E
Loy Yang Power Station	Australia	3,280	38°15′16″S 146°34′37″E
Mailiao Power Plant	Taiwan	4,200	23°48′0″N 120°11′0″E
Majuba Power Station	South Africa	4,110	27°06′02″S 29°46′17″E
Manjung Power Station	Malaysia	4,100	04°09′47″N 100°38′35″E
Matimba Power Station	South Africa	3,990	23°40′06″S 27°36′38″E
Matla Power Station	South Africa	3,600	26°16′57″S 29°08′27″E
Medupi Power Station	South Africa	4,584	23°42′00″S 27°33′00″E
Monroe Power Plant	United States	3,400	41°53′21″N 83°20′44″W
Mundra Thermal Power Station	India	4,620	22°49′25″N 69°33′10″E
Mundra Ultra Mega Power Station	India	4,000	22°48′54″N 69°31′41″E
Neurath Power Station	Germany	4,211	51°2′15″N 6°36′58″E
Niederaussem Power Station	Germany	3,864	50°59′44″N 06°40′09″E
Ninghai Power Station	China	4,400	29°28′57″N 121°30′34″E
Opole Power Plant	Poland	3,342	50°45′04″N 17°52′57″E
Paiton Power Station	Indonesia	4,710	07°42′43″S 113°34′48″E
Pengcheng Power Station	China	3,280	34°22′40″N 117°10′35″E
Pingwei Power Station	China	6,540	32°41′03″N 116°54′05″E
Huaneng Qinbei	China	4,400	35°10′11″N 112°42′56″E
Qinzhou Power Station	China	3,200	21°42′50″N 108°36′53″E
Reftinskaya GRES	Russia	3,800	57°06′24″N 61°42′42″E
Rihand Thermal Power Plant	India	3,000	24°01′39″N 82°47′28″E
Ryazan Power Station	Russia	3,020	54°02′04″N 39°46′39″E
Samcheonpo Power Station	South Korea	3,240	34°54′37″N 128°06′33″E
Sanbaimen Power Station	China	3,200	23°33′58″N 117°05′49″E
Sasan Ultra Mega Power Project	India	3,960	23°58′41″N 82°37′35″E
Shangdu Power Station	China	3,720	42°13′27″N 116°01′41″E
Shengtou Power Station	China	4,600	39°21′51″N 112°33′04″E
Scherer Generating Station	United States	3,520	33°03′47″N 83°48′14″W
Suizhong Power Station	China	3,600	40°04′46″N 120°00′29″E
Suralaya Power Station	Indonesia	4,025	05°53′30.87″S 106°01′52.32″E
Taean	South Korea	6,100	36°54′20″N 126°14′05″E
Talcher Super Thermal Power Plant	India	3,000	21°05′49″N 85°04′30″E
Taichung Power Plant	Taiwan	5,500	24°12′46″N 120°28′52″E
Tanjung Bin Power Station Complex	Malaysia	3,100	01°20′02″N 103°32′32″E
Tesla Power Plant Complex	Serbia	3,286.5	44°40′11.5″N 20°09′35.5″E
Tirora Thermal Power Station	India	3,300	21°24′58″N 79°58′3″E
Tuoketuo Power Station	China	6,720	40°11′49″N 111°21′52″E
Tutuka Power Station	South Africa	3,654	26°46′43″S 29°21′07″E
Vindhyachal Super Thermal Power Plant	India	4,760	24°05′53″N 82°40′18″E
Waigaoqiao Power Station	China	5,160	31°21′21″N 121°35′54″E
Yangcheng Power Station	China	3,300	35°28′01″N 112°34′21″E
Yeongheung Power Station	South Korea	5,080	37°14′17″N 126°26′09″E
Yimin Power Station	China	3,400	48°32′59″N 119°46′26″E
Yuhuan Power Station	China	4,000	28°6′59″N 121°8′17″E
Zhuhai Power Station	China	4,600	21°58′01″N 113°10′55″E
Zhujiang Power Station	China	3,800	22°48′51″N 113°34′04″E
Zouxian Power Station	China	4,540	35°19′31″N 116°55′42″E
Changle Power Station	China	6,000	40°39′21″N 96°29′55″E

== See also ==
- List of least carbon efficient power stations
- List of coal-fired power stations in the United States

== Sources ==
- Boom and Bust 2021: Tracking The Global Coal Plant Pipeline (Report). Global Energy Monitor. 2021-04-05.
