= Datong 2nd Power Station =

Chinese coal-fired power station

- Country: China
- Coordinates: 40.031°N 113.288°E

Datong 2nd Power Station is a large coal-fired power station in China.

== See also ==
- List of coal power stations
- List of major power stations in Shanxi
