= IMHA =

IMHA or Imha may refer to:

- Immune-mediated hemolytic anemia, an immune disorder, typically in dogs
- International Maritime Health Association, concerned with the health of maritime workers
- Imha Dam, a dam in South Korea
- Independent mental health advocacy, people acting as advocates for mental health patients
