= Pingwei Power Station =

Chinese coal-fired power station

Pingwei Power Plant
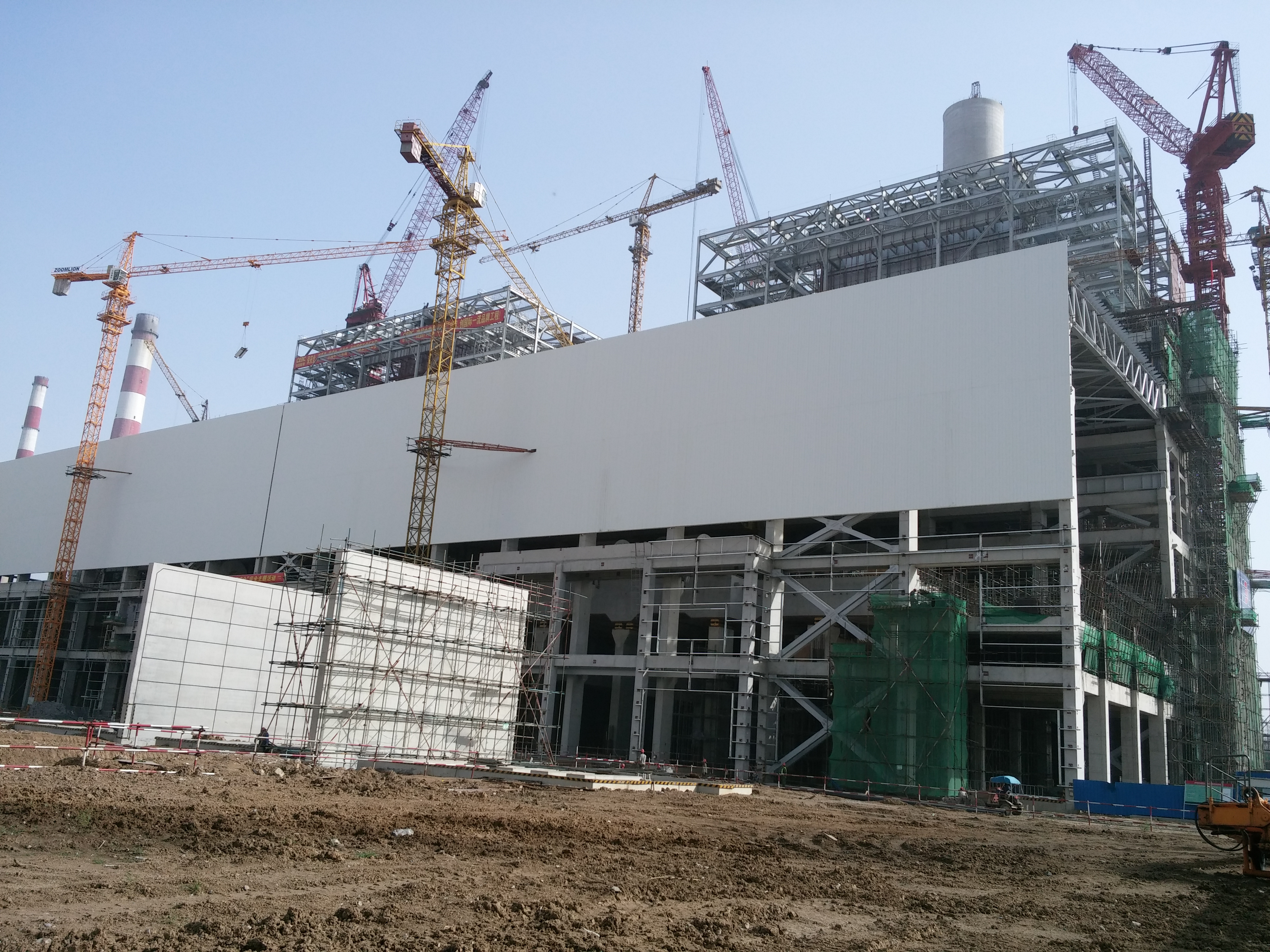
- Country: China
- Coordinates: 32°41′03″N 116°54′05″E
- Owner: China Power International Development

Power generation
- Nameplate capacity: 4,540 MW

Pingwei Power Station is a large coal-fired power station in China.

== See also ==
- List of coal power stations
- List of power stations in China
