= Yimin Power Station =

Chinese coal-fired power station

- Country: China
- Location: Inner Mongolia, China
- Coordinates: 48.549°N 119.774°E
- Status: Commissioned
- Commission date: September 1998
- Operators: Huaneng Yimin Coal & Electricity Co Ltd

Power generation
- Units operational: 2 x 500 MW 4 x 600 MW
- Nameplate capacity: 3,400 MW

Yimin Power Station or Huaneng Yimin Power Station is a large coal-fired power station in China. The power plant is located in Inner Mongolia, China and has 3,400 MW of capacity.

== See also ==
- List of coal power stations
- List of power stations in China
