= Hanchuan Power Station =

Chinese coal-fired power station

- Country: China
- Coordinates: 30.656°N 113.916°E

Hanchuan Power Station is a large coal-fired power station in China.

== See also ==
- List of coal power stations
- List of power stations in China
