= Tanjung Bin Power Station =

Malaysian power station

- Country: Malaysia
- Coordinates: 1°20′N 103°32′E
- Owner: Malakoff
- Operator: Malakoff

Power generation
- Nameplate capacity: 3,100 MW

Tanjung Bin Power Station is a large coal-fired power station in Malaysia.

== See also ==
- List of coal power stations
