= Haimen Power Station =

Chinese coal-fired power station

Huaneng Haimen Power Plant
- Country: China
- Coordinates: 23°11′17″N 116°39′14″E
- Owner: Huaneng Power International

Power generation
- Nameplate capacity: 4,144 MW

Haimen Power Station is a large coal-fired power station in China.

== See also ==
- List of coal power stations
- List of major power stations in Guangdong
