= Huaneng Qinbei power station =

Chinese coal-fired power station

Huaneng Qinbei Power Plant
- Country: China
- Coordinates: 35°10′11″N 112°42′56″E
- Owner: Huaneng Power International

Power generation
- Nameplate capacity: 4,400 MW

Huaneng Qinbei Power Station is a large coal-fired power station in China owned by Huaneng Power International.

== See also ==
- List of coal power stations
- List of power stations in China
