= Nantong Power Station =

Chinese coal-fired power station

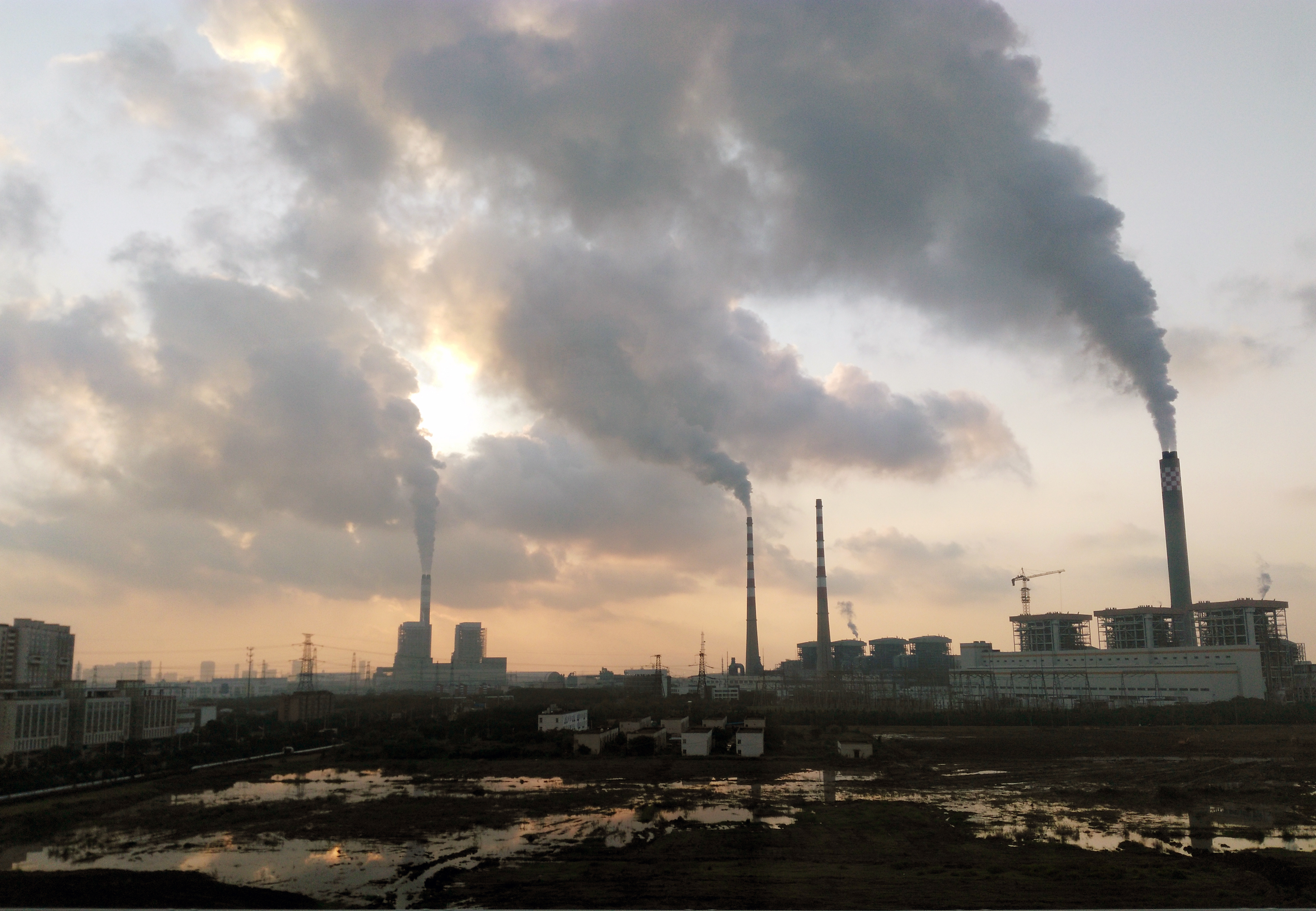
- Country: China
- Location: Jiangsu Province
- Coordinates: 32.032°N 120.770°E
- Status: Operational
- Commission date: 1989
- Operators: China Guodian Corporation and Shenhua Group

Thermal power station
- Primary fuel: Coal

Power generation
- Nameplate capacity: 2,000 MW

Nantong Power Station is a large coal-fired power station in China.

== See also ==
- List of coal power stations
- List of power stations in China
