= K-water =

South Korean government agency

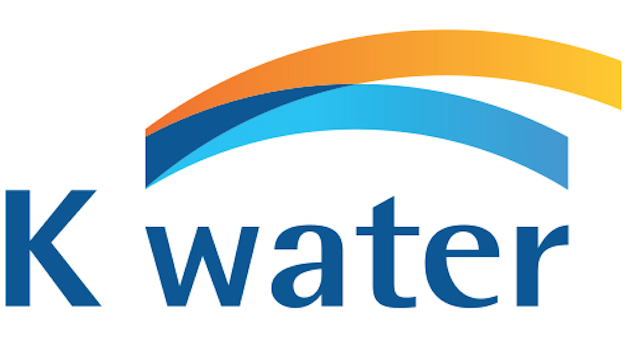
logo of K–water

The Korea Water Resources Corporation (Korean: 한국수자원공사; Hanja: 韓國水資源公社), or K-water, is the governmental agency for comprehensive water resource development and providing both public and industrial water in South Korea. The Comprehensive Development Plan of Land in August 1966 in accordance with the Korea Water Resources Development Corporation Act was enacted in November 1967. The Korea Water Resources Development Corporation was established in 1987, and the Korea Water Resources Corporation Act enacted in 1988.

== Timeline ==
- August 3, 1966 – Korea Water Resources Development Corporation Act was enacted
- November 16, 1967 – Korea Water Resources Development Corporation was founded
- June 30, 1973 – Reclamation of Western Industrial Park was completed
- October 15, 1973 – Soyanggangdaem was completed
- November 19, 1973 – Changwon Machinery Industrial Park Development Project was launched
- February 1, 1974 – Industrial Base Development Company was founded
- October 28, 1976 – Andong Multi-Purpose Dam was completed
- December 2, 1980 – Daecheong Dam was completed
- October 17, 1985 – Chungju Dam was completed
- November 16, 1987 – Nakdong River haguduk was completed
- December 4, 1987 – Korea Water Resources Corporation Act was enacted
- July 1, 1988 – Korea Water Resources Corporation was founded
- December 31, 1989 – Hapcheon Multi-Purpose Dam was completed
- November 19, 1993 – 1st construction phase of Ansan Planned Community was completed
- December 13, 1996 – Water supply of Ilsan Planned Community was expanded
- November 2, 2000 – Water supply of Chungju Dam was expanded
- December 30, 2003 – Water supply of Daecheong Dam was expanded
- December 30, 2003 – consignment of Nonsan water supply (first ever consignment agreement of local networks) was concluded
