= Samcheonpo Power Station =

Korean power station

Samcheonpo Power Plant
- Country: South Korea
- Coordinates: 34°54′42″N 128°06′35″E
- Operator: Korea South-East Power Company

Power generation
- Nameplate capacity: 3,240 MW

Samcheonpo Power Station is a large coal-fired power station in South Korea.

== See also ==
- List of coal power stations
