= Ninghai Power Station =

Chinese coal-fired power station

- Country: China
- Coordinates: 29°28′57″N 121°30′34″E
- Owner: CSEC

Power generation
- Nameplate capacity: 4,400 MW

Ninghai Power Station is a large coal-fired power station in China.

== See also ==
- List of coal power stations
