= Shangdu Power Station =

Chinese coal-fired power station

Huaneng Shangdu power station
- Country: China
- Location: Inner Mongolia
- Coordinates: 42.224°N 116.029°E
- Status: Operating
- Commission date: 2006
- Owners: China Huaneng and Beijing Energy Group

Shangdu Power Station is a large coal-fired power station in China.

== See also ==
- List of coal power stations
- List of power stations in China
