= Banqiao Power Plant =

Chinese power station

- Official name: 板桥电厂
- Country: China
- Location: Jiangsu
- Coordinates: 31.951193°N 118.633301°E
- Status: Operational
- Commission date: June 2004
- Owner: China Resources Power

Thermal power station
- Primary fuel: Coal

Power generation
- Units operational: 2 × 135 MW; 2 × 330 MW
- Nameplate capacity: 930 MW

Banqiao Power Plant (Chinese: 板桥电厂), known also as Nanjing Thermal Power Station and Jiangsu Nanre Coal Power Plant, is a coal-fired power station in the Jiangsu province of China, located near the city of Nanjing.

It began operations in June 2004 and has a power capacity of 930 Megawatt used for baseload energy generation. Its operational units consist of 2 × 135 MW and 2 × 330 MW coal-fired cogeneration units. The two 135 MW generation units were commissioned in June and December 2004 respectively, while the two 330 MW generation units were commissioned in July and December 2005 respectively.

Banqiao Power Plant is owned by China Resources Power with a stake of 65%. Electricity is sold to the state-owned Eastern China Power Grid Company. In June 2020, Banqiao Power Plant was recognised as an eco-education site in Nanjing after making several improvements to reduce pollution to meet local environmental standards.

== See also ==
- List of coal power stations
- List of power stations in China
