= Dalate Power Station =

Chinese coal-fired power station

Dalate power station
- Country: China
- Coordinates: 40.368°N 109.998°E

Dalate Power Station is a large coal-fired power station in China.

== See also ==
- List of coal power stations
