= Zouxian Power Station =

Power station in Shandong, China

Zouxian Power Station 邹县电厂
- Country: China
- Location: Shandong
- Coordinates: 35.3255698°N 116.9260912°E
- Status: Operational
- Owner: China Huadian Corporation

Thermal power station
- Primary fuel: Coal

Power generation
- Nameplate capacity: 4,540 MW

The Zouxian Power Station (Chinese: 邹县电厂; pinyin: Zōuxiàn Diànchǎng), also known as Zouxian Power Plant, is one of the largest power stations in China, with an installed capacity of 4,540 MW. The facility is located in Shandong Province, and is operated by China Huadian Corporation. It runs on coal.

== See also ==
- List of coal power stations
- List of largest power stations in the world
- List of power stations in China
