= Yuhuan Power Station =

Chinese coal-fired power station

Huaneng Yuhuan Power Plant
- Country: China
- Coordinates: 28.1158°N 121.1378°E
- Commission date: November 2006
- Owner: Huaneng Power International

Power generation
- Nameplate capacity: 4,000 MW

Yuhuan Power Station or Huaneng Yuhuan Power Station is a large coal-fired power station in Zhejiang, China.

== See also ==
- List of coal power stations
- List of power stations in China
