= Yangyang Pumped Storage Power Station =

- Country: South Korea
- Location: Yangyang
- Coordinates: 38°00′37″N 128°32′34″E
- Status: Operational
- Construction began: 1996
- Opening date: 2006
- Construction cost: ₩1.1 trillion won (US$1.4 billion).
- Owner(s): Korea Hydro & Nuclear Power

Upper reservoir
- Creates: Inje-gun
- Total capacity: 4,568,000 m^{3} (3,703 acre⋅ft)

Lower reservoir
- Creates: Yangyang-gun
- Total capacity: 19,982,000 m^{3} (16,200 acre⋅ft)

Power Station
- Hydraulic head: 817 m (2,680 ft) (maximum)
- Turbines: 4 x 250 MW (340,000 hp) reversible Francis-type
- Installed capacity: 1,000 MW (1,300,000 hp)

The Yangyang Pumped Storage Power Station uses the water of the Namdae-Chun River to operate a 1,000-megawatt (1,300,000 hp) pumped storage hydroelectric power scheme, about 10 kilometres (6.2 mi) west of Yangyang in Gangwon Province, South Korea. The lower reservoir is created by the Yangyang Dam on the Namdae and the upper reservoir by the Inje Dam is located 937 metres (3,074 ft) above the power plant. Construction on the power plant began in 1996 and it was completed and dedicated on September 13, 2006. It is operated by Korean Midland Power Co., a subsidiary of Korea Electric Power Company and was completed at a cost of ₩1.1 trillion won (US$1.4 billion). The first generator was operational on February 23, 2006 and the last August 10, 2006.

== Design and operation ==
The operation of the power plant begins on the Namdae-Chun River where it is dammed by the Yangsang (Sangbu) Dam at 38°01′15″N 128°33′15″E, creating the lower reservoir. This dam is 61.5 metres (202 ft) tall and 275 metres (902 ft) long concrete gravity dam. Water from a 124.9 km^{2} (48 sq mi) catchment area collects into the lower reservoir which has a 19,982,000 m^{3} (16,200 acre⋅ft) capacity, of which 4,200,000 m^{3} (3,405 acre⋅ft) is active (or "useful") capacity for the power station. The lower reservoir has a surface area of 1.1 km^{2} (272 acres) and operates at storage levels between 127 and 131 metres (417 and 430 ft) above sea level.

During low electricity demand periods, such as the night time, water from the lower reservoir is pumped 937 metres (3,074 ft) above the valley to the upper reservoir in the mountains. The upper reservoir is created by the Inje Dam, located 5.3 km^{2} (2 sq mi) west of the Yangyang Dam at 38°01′08″N 128°29′47″E. The Inje is a 84 m (276 ft) tall and 415 metres (1,362 ft) long rock-fill embankment dam. The capacity of the upper reservoir is 4,200,000 m^{3} (3,405 acre⋅ft) and it has a surface area of 190 square metres (0.047 acres; 0.019 ha). When electricity demand rises and the power plant begins to operate, water is released from the upper reservoir back towards the underground power plant, at the western edge of the lower reservoir. Water fluctuations in the upper reservoir range from 900 metres (3,000 ft) and 936 metres (3,071 ft) above sea level. The power plant contains four 250 MW reversible Francis turbine-generators for an installed capacity of 1,000 MW. The drop in elevation affords a maximum hydraulic head (drop) of 817 metres (2,680 ft) and effective head of 776 metres (2,546 ft).

Additionally, there are 2 x 1.5 megawatts (2,000 hp) Wind turbines installed at the upper reservoir and a 1.5 MW small hydro turbine on the Yangsang Dam.

== See also ==
- List of power stations in South Korea
