= Daecheong Dam =

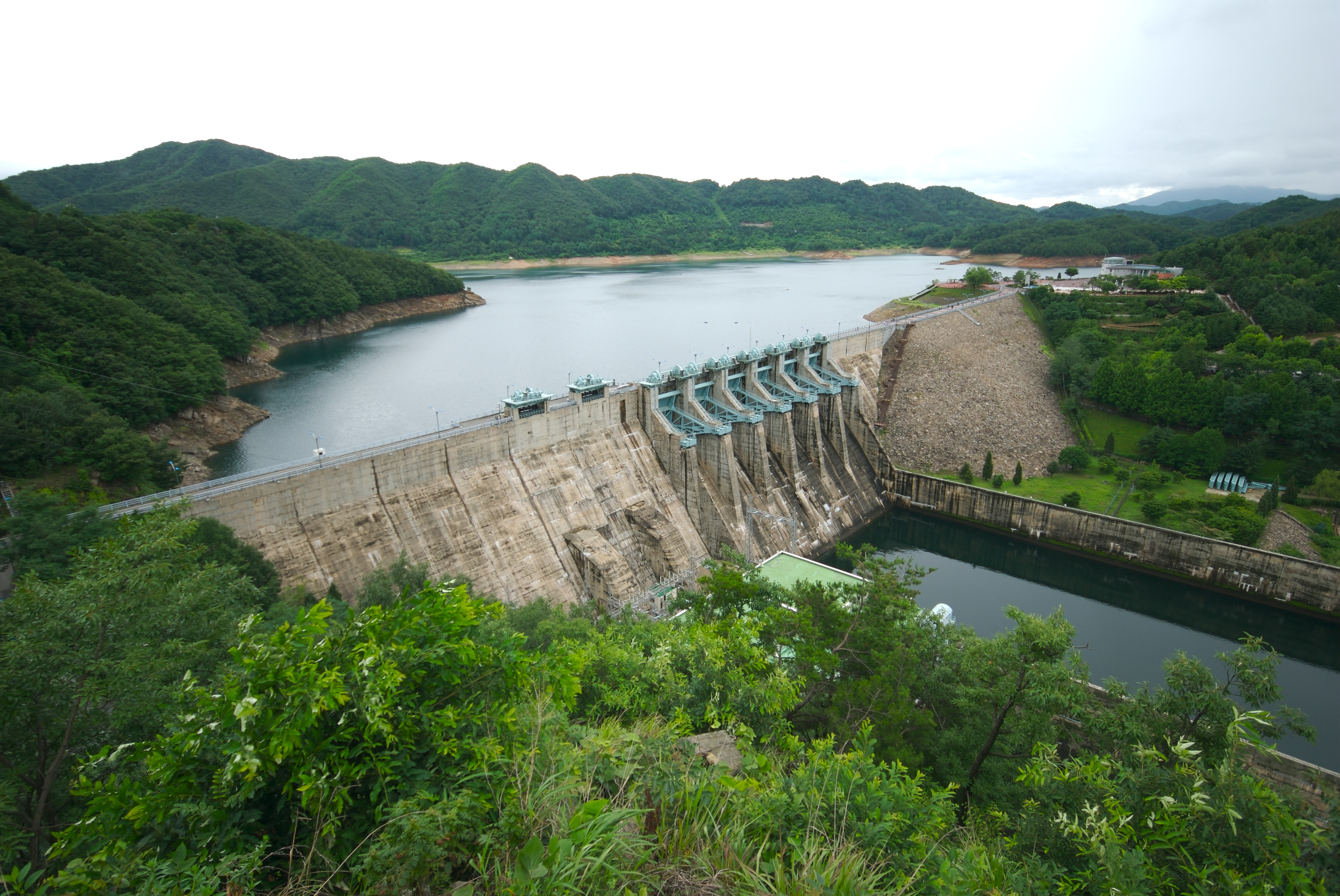

- Location within South Korea
- Country: South Korea
- Location: Daejeon
- Coordinates: 36°28′39″N 127°28′51″E
- Status: Operational
- Construction began: 1975
- Opening date: 1980
- Owner: Korea Water Resources Corporation

Dam and spillways
- Type of dam: Embankment and gravity
- Impounds: Geum River
- Height: 72 m (236 ft)
- Length: 495 m (1,624 ft)

Reservoir
- Total capacity: 1,490,000,000 m^{3} (1,207,963 acre⋅ft)
- Active capacity: 790,000,000 m^{3} (640,463 acre⋅ft)
- Surface area: 72.8 km^{2} (28 sq mi)

Power Station
- Turbines: 2 x 45 MW
- Installed capacity: 90 MW

The Daecheong Dam is a combination concrete gravity (made of concrete) and embankment dam (made of earth) on the Geum River, 16 km (10 mi) north of Daejeon in South Korea. The multi-purpose dam provides benefits of flood control, water supply and hydroelectric power generation. Construction on the dam began in 1975 and was formally commissioned on 1 December 1980. The 72 m (236 ft) high rock-fill dam has a central clay core and has created a reservoir with storage of 1,490,000,000 m^{3} (1,207,963 acre⋅ft).

The reservoir is operated by the Korea Water Resources Corporation (K-water) for flood control, hydro-power generation and water supply.

== Geography ==
The dam is built on the Geum River, also spelled Keum River or Geumgang River, which is the longest river in the central part of South Korea. The downstream stretch of the river up to the estuary is 146 kilometres (91 mi). The dam drains a catchment area of 4,166 square kilometres (1,609 sq mi). The land use pattern of the watershed is 74.5% of forest and hilly area, 16.3% of agricultural land of paddy and other crops, and 9.2% of urban area. The river is joined by five major tributaries and exhibits a dendritic (in the form of branches of a tree) drainage pattern. The catchment receives an annual average rainfall of 1,400 millimetres (55 in) of which more than 50% is recorded during the summer months from July to September, and many episodic (infrequent) events of more than 100 millimetres (3.9 in) have been recorded in a day. The hydrology of the project is thus influenced by the seasonal monsoon climate. There is scenic road on the entire periphery of the lake where Hyeonamsa Temple, and Munuihyanggyo Confucian School are located.

== Features ==
The multipurpose Daecheong Dam completed in 1980 is 72 metres (236 ft) in height, 495 metres (1,624 ft) long and has a gross reservoir capacity of 1.49 million cubic meters. The reservoir water surface area is 72 square kilometres (28 sq mi). It has three saddle dams on the reservoir periphery to prevent spilling of water. Following the building of the dam flood damage in the downstream reaches has been substantially prevented and salinity of the downstream land has also reduced. The annual inflow into the reservoir is 2,451 million cubic meter. The effective storage (live storage) created by the dam is 790 million cubic meter. The mean depth of water is 20 metres (66 ft) with a mean residence time of 180 days. The High Flood Level (HFL) of the reservoir is EL 80 m and the Full Reservoir Level (FRL) is EL 76.5 m. An upstream dam on the upper basin of Geum River, about 133 kilometres (83 mi) upstream, reduces the flow intensity and also the inflow into the reservoir.

The water supply from the reservoir is provided to Chungcheong, Daejeon, Cheongju, Jeollabuk-do areas which include Gunsan, Jeonju, and Iksan. The dam has hydro power facility with installed capacity of 90 MW and the annual power generation is around 240 million kWh.

Nutrient loading (contribution to Eutrophication) of the reservoir has occurred due to agricultural flows and from livestock farms in the catchment. It is classified as meso-stratified (influenced by biotic and abiotic factors).

Organic matter loading (contributed by plants and animals causing changes in the chemical oxygen demand ( COD, a measure of the amount of organic compounds in water), Mn (manganese)) in the lake is about 78.3% during heavy rainfall season, from June to September.

=== Daecheong Dam Water Culture Center ===
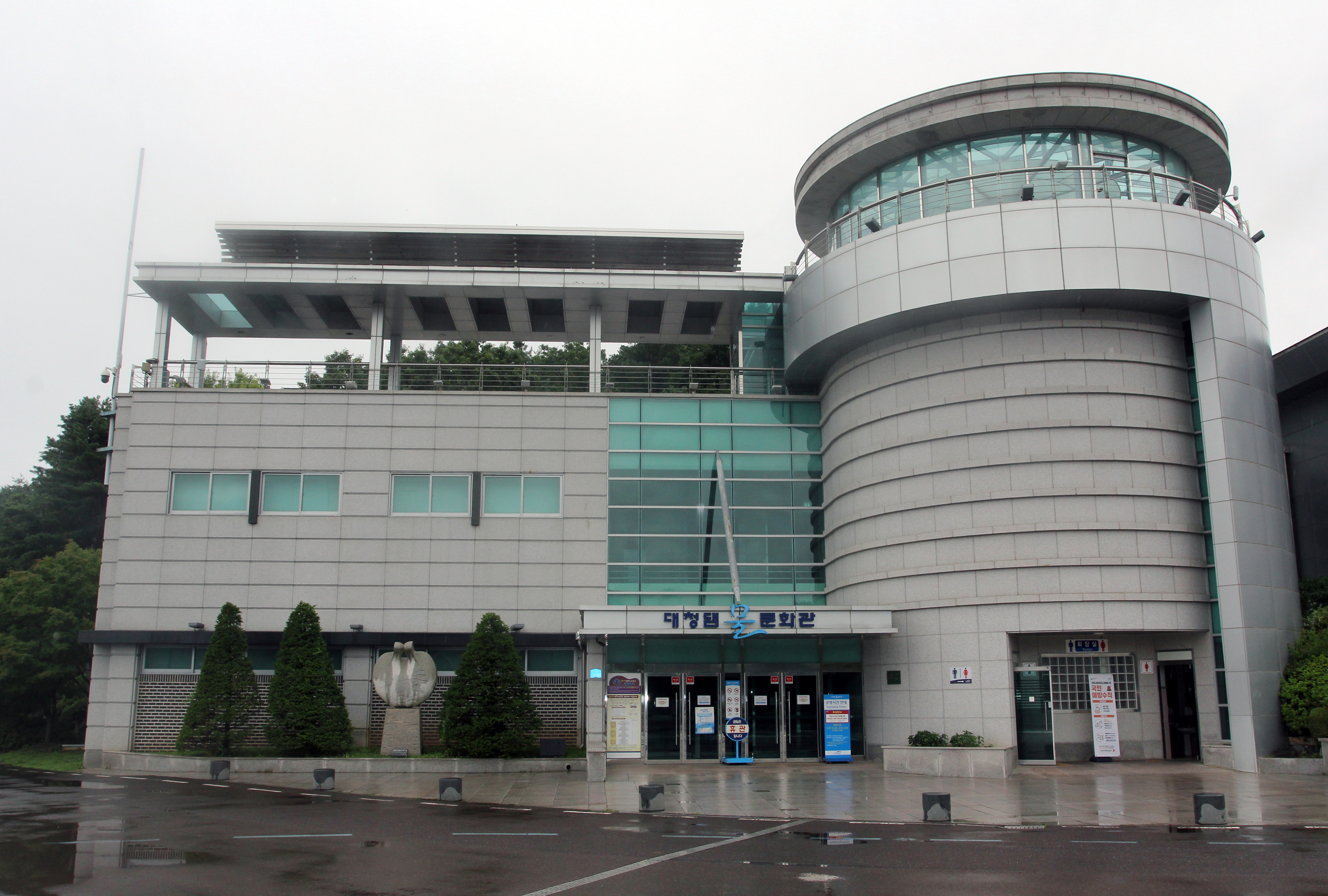
Daecheong Dam Water Culture Center

On the bank of the reservoir, a water-themed cultural museum called the Daecheong Dam Water Culture Center was established on 6 July 2004. It has three exhibition halls which display information on the dam, uses of water, environmental features of the area around on the Geumgang River also on the aspect of cultural aspects of the villages which were submerged by the reservoir and about people living on its periphery. The center also has a theater, information center, and an observatory.

== See also ==
- List of power stations in South Korea

== Bibliography ==
- Committee, Visit Korea (19 September 2013). I love korea: The story of why 33 foreign tourists fell in love with Korea. 길잡이미디어. GGKEY:EQXJS6NP7RR.
- Ho, Goen; Mathew, Kuruvilla (1 January 2004). Sustainability of Water Resources: Proceedings of the International Conference, Nov 2002, Perth Western Australia. IWA Publishing. ISBN 978-1-84339-502-7.
