= Manjung Power Station =

Power station in Manjung, Perak, Malaysia

- Country: Malaysia
- Coordinates: 4°10′N 100°38′E
- Owner: Tenaga Nasional

Power generation
- Nameplate capacity: 4,080 MW

Manjung Power Station (Malay: Stesen Janaelektrik Manjung) is a coal-fired power station in Manjung District, Perak, Malaysia.

== See also ==
- List of coal power stations
