= Taean Power Station =

Korean power station

Taean Thermal Power Station
- Official name: 태안화력발전소
- Country: South Korea
- Coordinates: 36°54′14″N 126°13′58″E
- Owner: Korea Western Power
- Operator: Korea Western Power

Power generation
- Nameplate capacity: 6,446.33 MW

Taean Thermal Power Station (Korean: 태안화력발전소) is a large coal-fired power station in Taean County, South Korea, owned by Korean Western Power Co, part of Korea Electric Power Corporation. As the second largest coal plant in the world, it is estimated to have been the coal-fired power plant which emitted the fourth most carbon dioxide in 2018, at 31 million tons, and relative emissions are estimated at 1.5kg per kWh. The government asked the company to voluntarily cut coal-fired generation in 2021, which they did. There is a pilot plant for coal gasification.

== See also ==
- List of coal power stations
