= Lingwu Power Station =

Chinese coal-fired power station

Ningxia Lingwu power station
- Country: China
- Coordinates: 38°08′53″N 106°20′46″E
- Owner: Huadian Power International

Power generation
- Nameplate capacity: 3,320 MW

Lingwu Power Station is a large coal-fired power station in China.

== See also ==
- List of coal power stations
- List of power stations in China
