= Houshi Power Station =

Chinese coal-fired power station

- Country: China
- Coordinates: 24°18′17″N 118°07′32″E

Power generation
- Nameplate capacity: 4,200 MW

Houshi Power Station is a large coal-fired power station in China.

== See also ==
- List of coal power stations
