= List of major power stations in Shanxi =

This page lists the major power stations located in Shanxi province.

== Non-renewable ==
=== Coal based ===
Station	Name in Chinese	Coordinates	Capacity (MW)	Operational units	Under construction units	Reference
Zhangze/Zhangshan Power Station	漳泽电厂/漳山电厂	36°19′19″N 113°04′50″E, 36°19′52″N 113°06′08″E	4,640	4×210 MW, 2×300 MW, 2×600 MW, 2×1,000 MW		
Datong 2nd Power Station	大同第二电厂	40°01′44″N 113°17′37″E	3,720	6×200 MW, 2×600 MW, 2×660 MW		
Yangcheng Power Station	阳城电厂	35°28′01″N 112°34′21″E	3,300	6×350 MW, 2×600 MW		
Shengtou Zhongdian Power Station	中电神头电厂	39°33′02″N 112°29′26″E	3,200	2×600 MW, 2×1,000 MW		,
Gujiao Power Station	古交电厂	37°53′48″N 112°05′41″E	3,120	2×300 MW, 2×600 MW, 2×660 MW		
Datong 1st/Yungang Thermal Power Station	大同一电厂/云岗热电厂	40°03′45″N 113°13′07″E	3,040	2×220 MW, 2×300 MW	2×1,000 MW	
Datong Tashan Pithead Power Station	大同塔山坑口电厂	39°55′35″N 113°05′01″E	2,520	2×600 MW, 2×660 MW		
Hequ Luneng Power Station	鲁能河曲电厂	39°22′59″N 111°11′08″E	2,400	4×600 MW		
Shengtou 2nd Power Station	神头二电厂	39°32′47″N 112°18′40″E	2,000	4×500 MW		
Yuxian Power Station	盂县电厂	38°04′41″N 113°29′02″E	2,000	2×1,000 MW		
Datong Hudong Power Station	大同湖东电厂	39°58′24″N 113°22′59″E	2,000		2×1,000 MW	
Hejin Power Station	河津电厂	35°36′47″N 110°39′21″E	1,900	2×350 MW, 2×600 MW		
Taiyuan 2nd Power Station	太原第二电厂	37°59′19″N 112°30′57″E	1,800	3×200 MW, 4×300 MW		
Zhaoguang Power Station	兆光电厂	36°33′13″N 111°41′34″E	1,800	2×300 MW, 2×600 MW		
Liulin Power Station	柳林电厂	37°25′16″N 110°49′34″E	1,400	2×100 MW, 2×600 MW		
Youyu Pithead Power Station	右玉坑口电厂	39°51′57″N 112°30′32″E	1,320	2×660 MW		
Tonghua Power Station	同华电厂	38°54′48″N 112°28′32″E	1,320	2×660 MW		
Zhongmei Pingshuo Power Station	中煤平朔电厂	39°32′47″N 112°18′40″E	1,320	2×660 MW		
Gaohe Power Station	高河电厂	36°09′55″N 112°57′43″E	1,320	2×660 MW		
Baode Power Station	苏晋保德煤电	38°52′37″N 111°07′13″E	1,320	2×660 MW		
Yangquan Thermal Power Station	华阳建投阳泉低热值煤热电项目	37°48′48″N 113°25′27″E	1,320	2×660 MW		
Yuguang Power Station	昱光电厂	39°36′55″N 112°47′58″E	1,300	2×300 MW, 2×350 MW		
Wangqu Power Station	王曲电厂	36°20′54″N 113°11′30″E	1,280	2×640 MW		
Taiyuan 1st Power Station	太原第一电厂	37°46′50″N 112°28′38″E	1,275	1×25 MW, 1×50 MW, 4×300 MW		
Shengtou Zhongdian Power Station	中电神头电厂	39°21′56″N 112°31′59″E	1,200	2×600 MW		
Pingshuo Gangue Power Station	平朔煤矸石电厂	39°28′23″N 112°19′13″E	1,200	2×300 MW		
Yangquan 2nd Power Station	阳泉第二电厂	37°46′27″N 113°37′34″E	1,200	4×300 MW		
Wuxiang Power Station	武乡电厂	36°49′16″N 112°50′03″E	1,200	2×600 MW		
Huozhou Power Station	霍州电厂	36°30′57″N 111°40′59″E	1,200	2×600 MW		
Zuoquan Power Station	左权电厂	37°04′01″N 113°21′34″E	1,200	2×600 MW		
Yuncheng Power Station	运城电厂	34°38′48″N 110°17′18″E	1,200	2×600 MW		
Yushe Power Station	榆社电厂	36°58′42″N 112°57′15″E	800	2×100 MW, 2×300 MW		
Guojin Power Station	国金电厂	37°21′10″N 112°0′28″E	700	2×350 MW		
Hepo Power Station	河坡电厂	37°55′10″N 113°36′54″E	700	2×350 MW		
Hequ Shenhua Power Station	神华河曲电厂	39°24′44″N 111°14′47″E	700	2×350 MW		
Hequ Shanmei Power Station	山煤河曲电厂		700	2×350 MW		
Datuhe Power Station	大土河电厂	37°34′17″N 111°16′38″E	700	2×350 MW		
Qiguang Power Station	启光电厂	36°49′17″N 111°37′32″E	700	2×350 MW		
Lülin Power Station	吕临电厂	38°02′39″N 111°05′50″E	700	2×350 MW		
Tongmei Yanggao Thermal Power Station	同煤阳高热电厂	40°15′47″N 113°39′02″E	700	2×350 MW		
Huadian Shuozhou Power Station	华电朔州热电厂	39°21′26″N 112°29′01″E	700	2×350 MW		
Chongguang Jiexiu Power Station	崇光介休电厂	37°06′18″N 111°59′50″E	700	2×350 MW		
Xiaoyi Thermal Power Station	孝义热电厂	37°04′54″N 111°50′19″E	700	2×350 MW		
Ningwu Thermal Power Station	华润宁武热电厂	39°02′39″N 112°18′37″E	700	2×350 MW		
Jinxing Power Station	华电锦兴电厂	38°22′47″N 111°7′26″E	700	2×350 MW		
Jinzhong Thermal Power Station	晋中热电厂	37°13′10″N 112°17′21″E	600		2×300 MW	
Jincheng Thermal Power Station	晋城热电厂	35°27′38″N 112°55′32″E	600	2×300 MW		
Linfeng Thermal Power Station	临汾热电厂	36°05′12″N 111°23′58″E	600	2×300 MW		

== Renewable ==
=== Hydroelectric ===
==== Conventional ====
Station	Name in Chinese	Coordinates	River	Capacity (MW)	Dam height (meters)	Status	Operational units	Under construction units	Reference
Guxian Hydro Power Station	古贤水利枢纽工程	36°13′28″N 110°27′06″E	Yellow River	2,100	199	Under Construction		6*350 MW	
Wanjiazhai Hydro Power Station	万家寨水电站	39°34′43″N 111°25′42″E	Yellow River	1,080	105	Operational	6×180 MW		
Longkou Hydro Power Station	龙口水电站	39°25′11″N 111°17′34″E	Yellow River	420	51	Operational	4×100 MW, 1×20 MW		
Tianqiao Hydro Power Station	天桥水电站	39°03′51″N 111°07′58″E	Yellow River	128	42	Operational	62×28 MW, 2×36 MW		
Sanmenxia Hydropower Station	三门峡水利枢纽	34°49′52″N 111°20′42″E	Yellow River	400	106	Operational	5×50 MW, 2×75 MW		

==== Pumped-storage ====
Station	Name in Chinese	Coordinates	Capacity (MW)	Rated head (meters)	Status	Operational units	Under construction units
Hunyuan Pumped Storage Power Station	浑源抽水蓄能电站	39°34′19″N 113°36′21″E	1,500	649	UC		4×375 MW
Xilongchi-2 Pumped Storage Power Station	西龙池二期抽水蓄能电站		1,400	518	UC		4×350 MW
Shangshe Pumped Storage Power Station	上社抽水蓄能电站		1,400	604	UC		4×350 MW
Xilongchi Pumped Storage Power Station	西龙池抽水蓄能电站	38°32′14″N 113°16′24″E	1,200	640	Operational	4×300 MW	
Yuanqu Pumped Storage Power Station	垣曲抽水蓄能电站	35°03′45″N 111°39′04″E	1,200		UC		4×300 MW
Yuanqu Pumped Storage Power Station phase 2	垣曲二期抽水蓄能电站			386	UC		4×300 MW

== See also ==
- List of power stations in China
