= Liuzhou Power Station =

Liuzhou Power Station 柳州电厂
- Country: China
- Location: Liubei District, Liuzhou City
- Purpose: Power
- Construction began: 1916

Liuzhou Power Station (Chinese: 柳州电厂), also spelled Liuzhou Power Plant, is a large coal-fired power plant located in Liubei District, Liuzhou City.

== History ==
Liuzhou Power Station was first constructed in 1916 (another saying is 1917), and its predecessor was Liuzhou Electric Light Company (柳州电灯公司), which was changed to Liuzhou Electric Light Bureau (柳州电灯局) in 1926, Liuzhou Branch of Guangxi Electric Power Plant (广西电力厂柳州分厂) in 1935, and Liuzhou Power Station in 1942.

On the eve of the Chinese Communist Party's occupation of Liuzhou, Bai Chongxi ordered the defenders to blow up the Liuzhou Power Plant while fleeing Liuzhou. However, the power plant was preserved under the protection of the entire plant's employees. In 1958, the 3×12000-kilowatt unit plant of the first phase of construction of Liuzhou Power Plant was located at the western foot of Que'er Mountain (雀儿山) in Liubei Industrial Zone. In December 1959, November 1960, and May 1969, three units of the plant were completed and put into production for power generation.

Liuzhou Power Plant temporarily suspended production on the evening of March 30, 2018, and all two generating units ceased operation.
