= Zhujiang Power Station =

Chinese coal-fired power station

- Country: China
- Location: Guangdong, China
- Coordinates: 22.8141°N 113.5676°E
- Status: Commissioned
- Commission date: April 1994
- Owners: Guangzhou Development Group and Altima International

Power generation
- Units operational: 3 x 300 MW 1 x 320MW
- Nameplate capacity: 1220 MW

Zhujiang Power Station or Yangxi Zhujiang power station is a large coal-fired power station in Guangzhou China.

== See also ==
- List of coal power stations
- List of power stations in China
