= Beihai Power Station =

Beihai Power Station 北海电厂
- Country: China
- Location: Tieshan Port (Linhai) Industrial Zone
- Purpose: Power
- Construction began: 1987
- Construction cost: ¥8.26 billion

Beihai Power Station (Chinese: 北海电厂), also spelled Beihai Power Plant, is a large coal-fired power plant located in Shitoubu Village (石头埠村), Xinggang Town (兴港镇), Tieshan Port District (铁山港区). The total investment of the project was 8.26 billion yuan.

== History ==
The plant was first constructed in 1987, and Guangxi signed an agreement with the Hong Kong and Macao International Investment Corporation to jointly build the Beihai Power Station. However, the construction of the project was suspended in 1999 due to capital and environmental protection issues.

Construction of the first phase of the Beihai Power Plant officially began in June 2003, and was officially put into trial production on March 9, 2005. The total installed capacity of the first phase of the plant is 2×300 MW coal-fired units, and the total investment was 2.65 billion yuan.
