= Sanbaimen Power Station =

Chinese coal-fired power station

- Country: China
- Coordinates: 23°33′58″N 117°05′49″E

Power generation
- Nameplate capacity: 3,200 MW

Sanbaimen Power Station or Xuzhou Power Station is a large coal-fired power station in China.

== See also ==
- List of coal power stations
- List of power stations in China
