= Jurong power station =

Chinese coal-fired power station

- Country: China
- Coordinates: 32.196°N 119.248°E

Huadian Jurong power station or Jurong power station is a large coal-fired power station in China.

== See also ==
- List of coal power stations
- List of power stations in China
