= Changshu Power Station =

Chinese coal-fired power station

Changshu Power Plants
- Country: China
- Coordinates: 31°45′25″N 120°58′30″E

Power generation
- Nameplate capacity: 5,270 MW

Changshu Power Station or "Changshu-1 power station" is a large coal-fired power station in China.

== See also ==
- List of coal power stations
