= Boryeong Power Station =

Korean power station

Boryeong Power Plant
- Country: South Korea
- Coordinates: 36°24′N 126°29′E
- Operator: Korea Midland Power

Power generation
- Nameplate capacity: 1,350 MW; 4,000 MW; 5,350 MW

Boryeong Power Station is a large coal-fired power station in South Korea.

== See also ==
- List of coal power stations
