= Zhuhai Power Station =

Chinese coal-fired power station

Zhuhai Power Plant
- Country: China
- Coordinates: 21°58′05″N 113°10′55″E
- Owner: Guangdong Energy Group

Power generation
- Nameplate capacity: 1,400 MW

Zhuhai Power Station is a large coal-fired power station in China.

== See also ==
- List of coal power stations
