= Opole Power Plant =

Coal-fired thermal power station in Poland

Opole Power Station
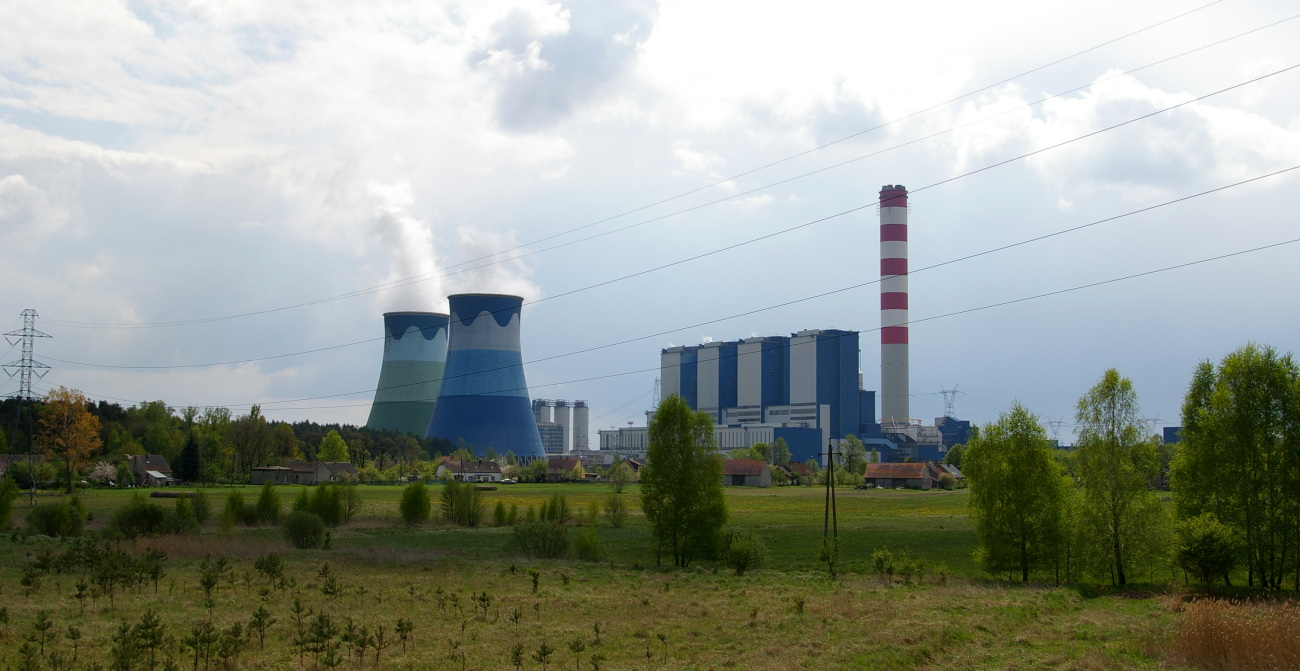
- Country: Poland
- Location: Opole
- Coordinates: 50°48′N 17°54′E

Power generation
- Nameplate capacity: 3,280 MW

External links
- Website: www.elopole.pgegiek.pl
- Commons: Related media on Commons

Opole Power Plant is a coal-fired thermal power station in Opole, Poland, 100 km (62 mi) from Katowice. It is Poland's third largest power station with an installed capacity of 3.3 GW. The plant is fueled primarily by bituminous coal and uses flue-gas desulfurization.

Four power units were constructed from 1993–1997. Two additional units were built from 2014–2019, with a total generating capacity of 3342 MW. In 2012, Rafako, Mostostal Warszawa and Polimex-Mostostal formed a consortium to construct the additional units. Due to Rafako's financial problems, they were replaced by Alstom in 2013. Construction on No. 5 and No. 6 units began in January 2014 and ended in 2019.

== Radio antennae ==
The highest of the chimneys is also used for transmission purposes. A system of transmitting antennas was mounted on it, including FM for Radio Doxa. The program is transmitted with a power of 10 kW on a frequency of 107.9 MHz in vertical polarization. The height of the antenna support is 151 meters above sea level and the height of the facility is 250 meters above sea level. The height of the antenna system's suspension is 230 meters above sea level.
