= Pengcheng Power Station =

Chinese coal-fired power station

Xuzhou Power Station
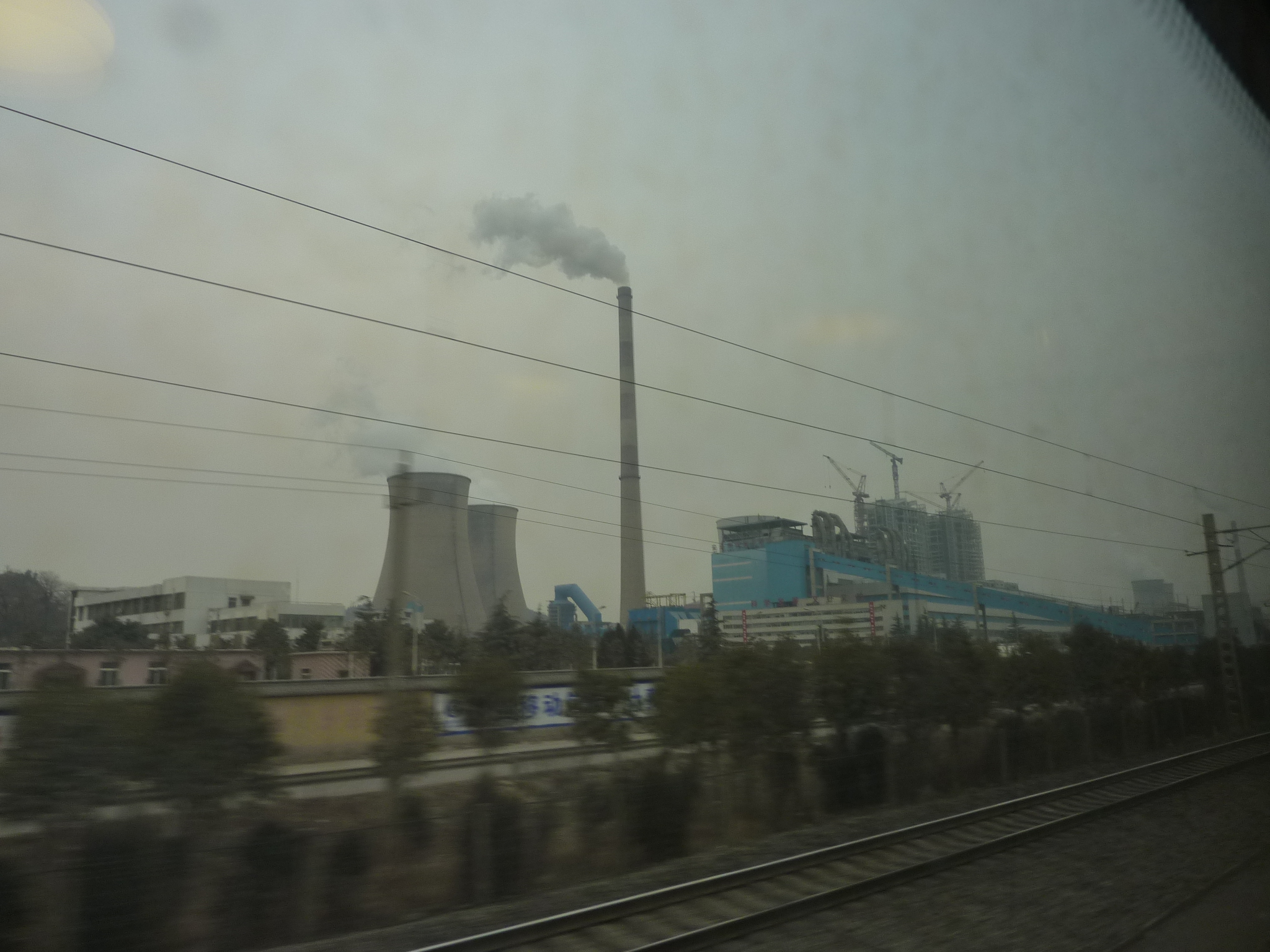
- Country: China
- Coordinates: 34°23′10″N 117°15′28″E

External links
- Commons: Related media on Commons

Pengcheng Power Station or Xuzhou Power Station is a large coal-fired power station in China.

== See also ==
- List of coal power stations
- List of power stations in China
