= Shenzhen Mawan Thermal Power Station =

Coal-fired power station in Shenzhen, China

Coordinates: 22.48°N 113.872°E

Shenzhen Mawan Thermal Power Station (深圳马湾电厂) is a coal fired power plant located in Nanshan district in the city of Shenzhen, Guangdong province, China. It was one of the first coal fired plants in China to implement clean coal technology to lower the presence of sulphur and nitrogen oxides in its effluent, thus reducing air pollution dramatically.

The power plant has a capacity of 6 x 300 MW and is located in the South west of Shenzhen, near the coast where a dedicated coal jetty provides a supply of coal for the plant.

== History ==
Shenzhen Mawan power plant was commissioned in September 1989 as a Sino-foreign joint venture controlled by the Shenzhen Energy Group Co., Ltd. As of May 2018, the power plant consists of six 320MW coal-fired units. Additionally, the Shenzhen Mawan power company also owns the two 50,000-ton coal piers and one 10,000-ton oil wharf located next to the power plant.

Along with three other power plants located in Shenzhen (one nuclear and two gas fired), Mawan Power Company provides a large section of the power for Shenzhen power grid. The Company is included in China’s Top 500 list of Largest Industrial Enterprises and National Advanced Enterprise of Energy-Saving. Its Unit 5 and Unit 6 won the first prize in the National Coal-fired Power Unit (300 MW Grade) Competition, while Unit 4, 5 and 6 have been awarded National Reliable Gold Unit by the State Electricity Regulatory Commission.

== Operations ==
The power plant is operated by "SE Mawan power corporation", a company jointly owned and operated by the Shenzhen government, Shenzhen Mawan power company ltd, the central government, Bai rui shun Beijing co. ltd. .
