= Laibin Power Station =

Laibin Power Station 来宾电厂
- Country: China
- Location: Liuzhou, Guangxi
- Purpose: Power
- Construction began: January 6, 1987

Laibin Power Station (Chinese: 来宾电厂), also spelled Laibin Power Plant, is a coal-fired power plant located in Laibin Municipal Henan Industrial Park (来宾市河南工业园区), covering an area of 458 mu. It is the first BOT pilot project approved by the Central People's Government of the People's Republic of China.

== History ==
The 2×125 MW units of the first phase of the Laibin Power Station started construction on January 6, 1987, and the two units were put into operation in March 1989 and January 1990 respectively.

In 1995, approved by the State Planning Commission of the People's Republic of China, the People's Government of Guangxi Zhuang Autonomous Region decided to adopt the BOT investment and financing method to construct the second phase of the generating station (Laibin Power Plant B). The two generating units were put into production in September 1999 and May 2000 respectively.

Laibin Power Plant B is the first power plant constructed in BOT manner in the People's Republic of China, with an installed capacity of 720,000 kilowatts and a total investment of US$616 million, of which 25% is invested by shareholders, Électricité de France and Alstom.
