= Jiaxing Power Station =

Coal fired power station in Jiaxing, China

- Country: China
- Location: Jiaxing, Zhejiang
- Coordinates: 30°38′N 121°09′E
- Status: Operational
- Construction began: 1995
- Commission date: 1995-2011
- Construction cost: US$15.78 billion
- Owner: Zhejiang Energy Group Co Ltd
- Operator: Zhejiang Jiaxing Power Generation Co Ltd

Thermal power station
- Primary fuel: Bituminous coal

Power generation
- Units operational: 2 X 300 MW 4 X 600 MW 3 X 1000 MW
- Nameplate capacity: 6300 MW

The Jiaxing Power Station is a state-owned 5000 megawatt coal fired power station owned by Zhejiang Energy Group Co Ltd in Zhejiang. The $15.78 billion plant is situated in Jiaxing. With an installed capacity of 5,000 MW, it is the 9th largest coal-fired power station in the world. (It shares this title with the Guohua Taishan Power Station.) The plant consists of two 300MW sub-critical units, four 600MW super-critical units and three 1000MW ultra-supercritical units, which combined form the 6,300MW plant.
