= Korea Western Power =

South Korean energy company

- Native name: 한국서부발전
- Founded: 2001; 25 years ago
- Headquarters: Taean, South Chungcheong, South Korea
- Parent: Ministry of Trade
- Website: kogas.or.kr

Korea Western Power (KOWEPO; Korean: 한국서부발전; RR: Hanguk Seobi Baljeon) is an energy company based in South Korea. The company is a subsidiary of Korea Electric Power Corporation (KEPCO), and operates power plants including the Taean Thermal Power Plant. It has ten bituminous coal-fired power plants, 22 gas-fired combined cycles, and four petroleum-fired power plants.
