= Dangjin Power Station =

South Korean coal-fired power station

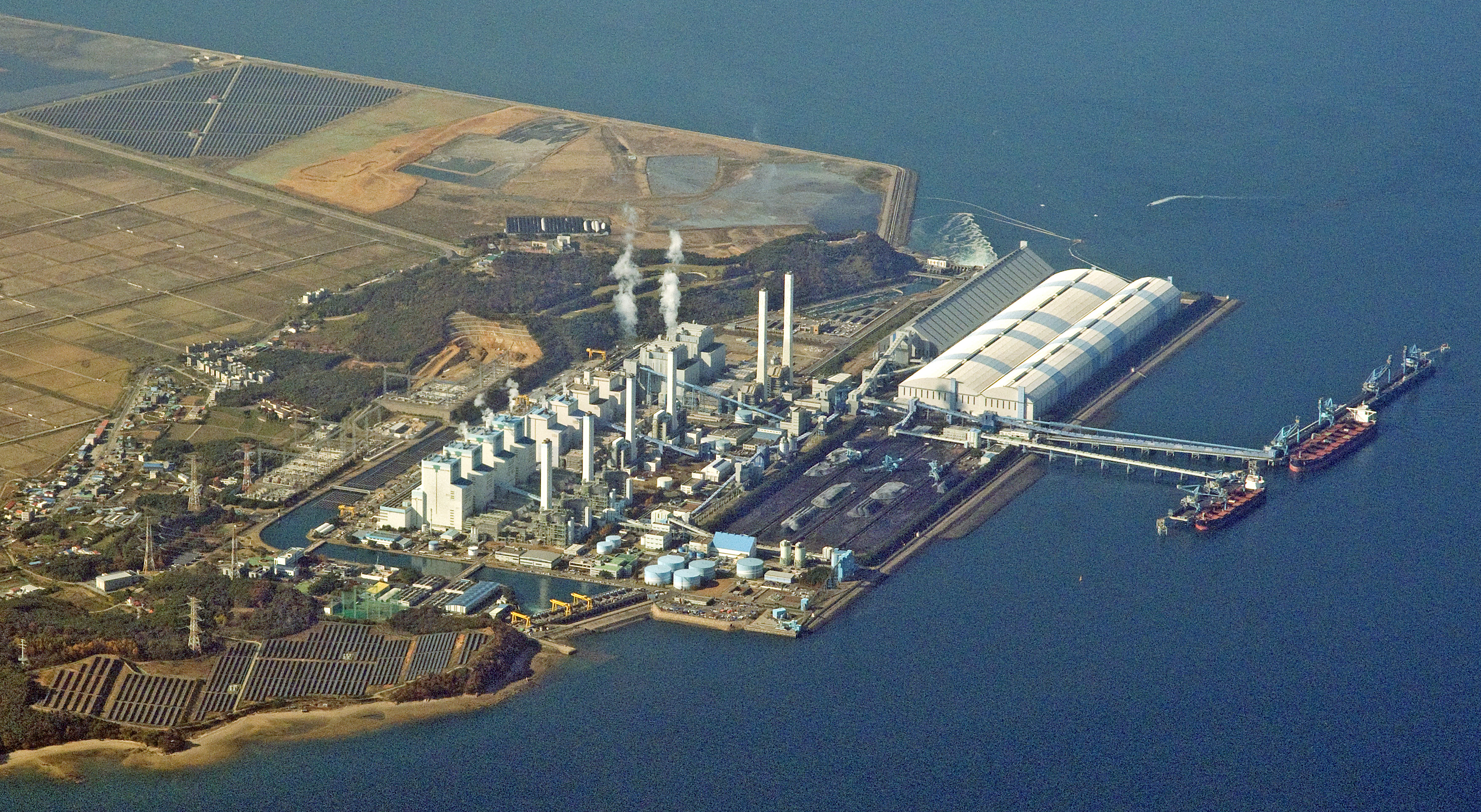
- Aerial view of Dangjin Power Station (November 2025)
- Country: South Korea
- Coordinates: 37°03′18″N 126°30′41″E
- Owner: Korea South-East Power Company
- Operator: Korea South-East Power Company

Power generation
- Nameplate capacity: 6,040 MW

Dangjin Power Station (Korean: 당진화력발전소; Hanja: 唐津火力發電所) is a large coal-fired power station in Dangjin, South Korea, owned by Korea East-West Power, part of Korea Electric Power Corporation.

Third largest in the world the plant is estimated to have been the coal-fired power plant which emitted the third most carbon dioxide in 2018, at 34 million tons, and relative emissions are estimated at 1.5 kg per kWh. The government asked the company to voluntary cut coal-fired generation in 2021, which they did. Waste water is used for fish farming.

== See also ==
- List of coal power stations
