= Yongfu Power Station =

Yongfu Power Station 永福电厂
- Location within Guangxi Location within China
- Country: China
- Location: Guilin, Guangxi
- Coordinates: 25.1°N 110.07°E
- Purpose: Power
- Construction began: July 1998

Yongfu Power Station (Chinese: 永福电厂), also known as Guodian Yongfu Power Plant or Yongfu Power Plant, is a Chinese thermal power plant located at Yongfu County. The power plant belongs to China Energy Investment Corporation.

== History ==
Construction of Yongfu Power Station began in July 1998. In the first phase of the plant, two 125,000-kilowatt modified ultra-high pressure units were completed and put into operation in 2000.

The 2×300 MW sub-critical coal-fired units in the second phase of the project were put into operation in 2007.

In 2008, the project of using high-efficiency and low-consumption large units and shutting down high-consumption and low-efficiency small units in Yongfu Power Plant was formally approved by the National Development and Reform Commission, with a total investment of 2.69 billion yuan.

In November 2013, China Guodian Corporation and Électricité de France jointly built the third phase of Yongfu Power Station, with a total investment of approximately 2.8 billion yuan.
