= Guohua Taishan Power Station =

Power station in Jiangmen, Guangdong, China

Guohua Taishan Power Station 国华台山发电厂
- Country: China
- Location: Guangdong
- Coordinates: 21°51′52″N 112°55′24″E
- Status: Operational
- Commission date: March 2011 (Unit 6); November 2011 (Unit 7)
- Owner: China Energy Investment Corporation

Thermal power station
- Primary fuel: Coal

Power generation
- Units operational: 5 X 600 MW; 2 X 1,000 MW
- Nameplate capacity: 5,000 MW

Guohua Taishan Power Station (simplified Chinese: 国华台山发电厂; traditional Chinese: 國華台山發電廠; pinyin: Guóhuá Táishān Fādiànchǎng) is a coal-fired power station in Taishan, Jiangmen, Guangdong, China. With an installed capacity of 5,000 MW, it is the 9th largest coal-fired power station in the world. (It shares this title with the Jiaxing Power Station.)

== History ==
The first unit of the power station was commissioned in 2003. Other units were further commissioned until 2011.

== See also ==
- List of coal power stations
- List of largest power stations in the world
- List of power stations in China
