= Yangcheng Power Station =

Power station in Beiliu, Shanxi, China

Yangcheng Power Station 阳城电厂
- Country: China
- Location: Shanxi
- Coordinates: 35°28′01″N 112°34′21″E
- Status: Operational
- Construction began: 2002
- Commission date: 1996
- Owner: Datang International Power Generation Company

Thermal power station
- Primary fuel: Coal

Power generation
- Units operational: 6 x 350 MW, 2 x 600 MW
- Nameplate capacity: 3,300 MW

Yangcheng Power Station (Chinese: 阳城电厂) is a coal-fired power station in Beiliu, Shanxi, China. It has an installed capacity of 3,300 MW. The plant was first commissioned in 1996. Construction on phase one of the plant began in 2001 and ended in 2007. The plant is the site of the world's two largest dry cooling towers.

== See also ==
- List of coal power stations
- List of largest power stations in the world
- List of power stations in China
