= Ligang Power Station =

Chinese coal-fired power station

Jiangsu Ligang Power Plant
- Country: China
- Coordinates: 31°56′26″N 120°04′33″E
- Owner: CITIC Group

Power generation
- Nameplate capacity: 4,040 MW

Ligang Power Station is a large coal-fired power station in China.

== See also ==
- List of coal power stations
- List of power stations in China
