= Huilai Power Station =

Chinese coal-fired power station

Huilai Power Plant
- Country: China
- Coordinates: 23°00′18″N 116°32′49″E
- Owner: Guangdong Energy Group

Power generation
- Nameplate capacity: 3,200 MW

Huilai Power Station or is a large coal-fired power station in China.

== See also ==
- List of coal power stations
- List of power stations in China
