= Duyên Hải Power Station =

Vietnamese power plant complex

Coordinates: 09°35′00″N 106°31′38″E

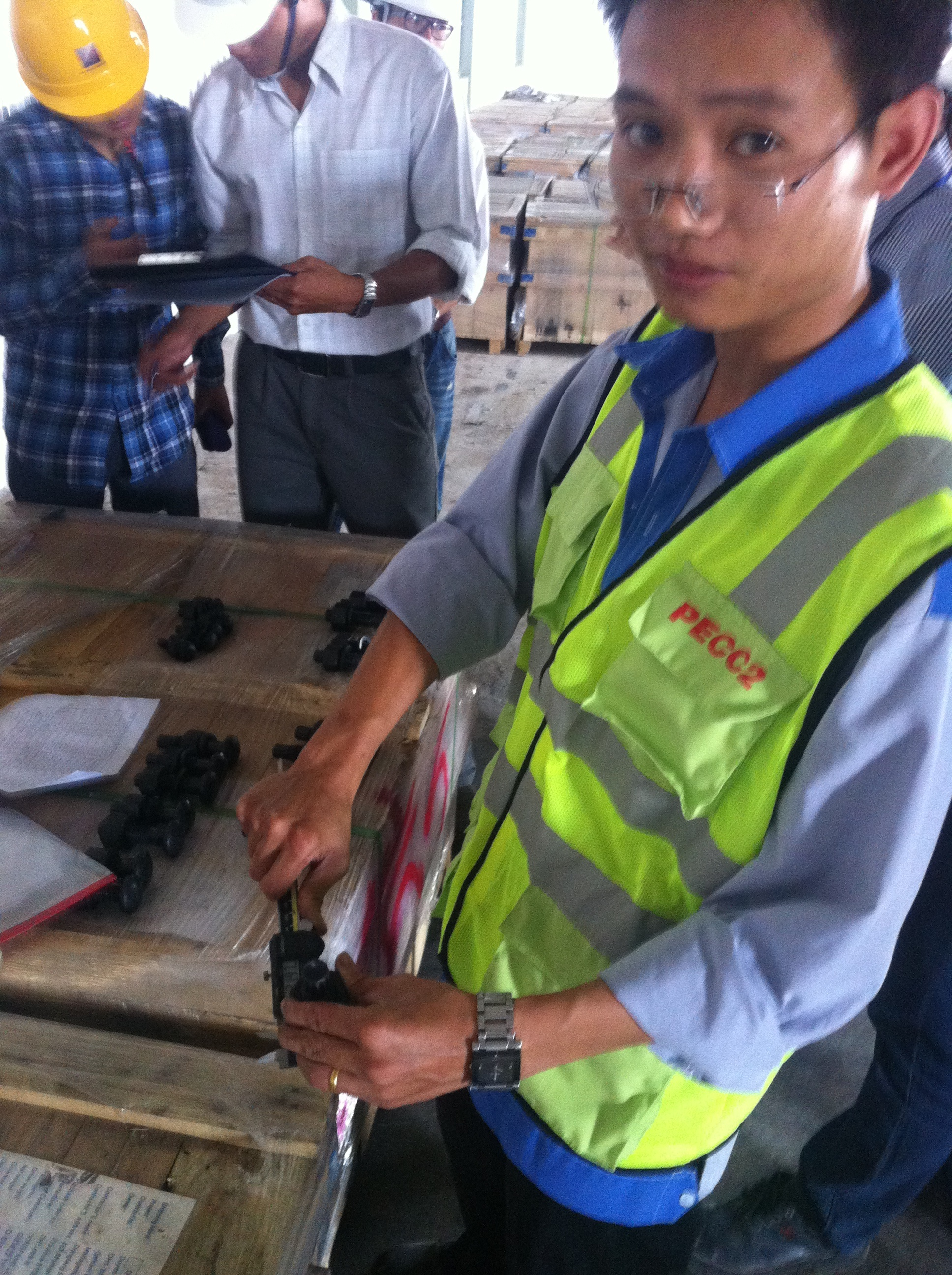
Boiler #1 high strength bolts material input inspection

The Duyên Hải Power Station is a complex of under-construction coal-fired power plants in Vietnam. It is located in Mu U Hamlet, Dan Thanh Commune, Duyên Hải District, Trà Vinh Province. The complex will have a total capacity of 3,689 MW. It includes also a seaport coal terminal, to be built by China Communications Construction Company, with a capacity of 12 million tonnes of coal and oil per year.

== Duyen Hai 1 ==
Duyen Hai 1 will have an installed capacity of 1,245 MW (2 X 622.5MW) and its annual output will be 7.5–8 GWh. The plant will cost US$1.5 billion. It is owned by Vietnam Electricity.

Engineering, procurement and construction contract was signed on 30 March 2010 and construction started on 19 September 2010. The main contractor is Dongfang Electric Corporation Limited According to the contract, unit 1 would be operational by 25 July 2015 and unit 2 by 25 September 2015. It is expected that the first boiler at unit 1 would be fired on 25 October 2014.

== Duyen Hai 2 ==
The 1,200-MW Duyen Hai 2 will be developed by Malaysian company Janakuasa under build–operate–transfer agreement. The engineering, procurement and construction contract is awarded to Alstom.

== Duyen Hai 3 ==
Duyen Hai 3 has a planned capacity of 1,244 MW. It consists of two condensing units, 622 MW each. When built, it is expected to use 3.6 million metric tons of coal a year for annual production of 7.8 GWh of electricity. The plant will cost US$1.37 billion. It is owned by Vietnam Electricity.

The plant will be built by Chinese Chengda-Dec-Swepdi-Zepc consortium as the main contractor. Construction started on 8 December 2012, and it is expected to become operational in 2015–2016. The plant covers an area of 879 hectares (2,170 acres).
