= Imha Dam =

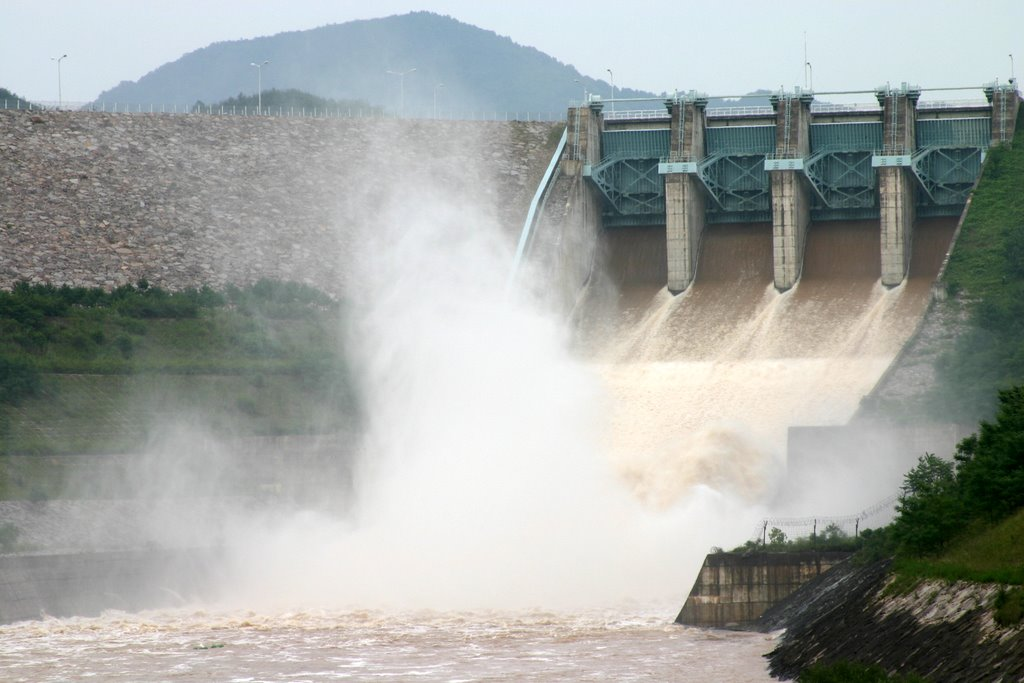
- Spillway of the dam

- Location within South Korea
- Country: South Korea
- Location: Andong
- Coordinates: 36°32′15″N 128°53′00″E
- Status: Operational
- Construction began: 1987
- Opening date: 1991
- Owner: Korea Water Resources Corporation

Dam and spillways
- Type of dam: Embankment, rock-fill
- Impounds: Banbyeoncheon River
- Height: 73 m (240 ft)
- Length: 515 m (1,690 ft)
- Dam volume: 3,423,000 m^{3} (4,477,115 cu yd)

Reservoir
- Total capacity: 595,000,000 m^{3} (482,374 acre⋅ft)
- Catchment area: 1,361 km^{2} (525 sq mi)
- Surface area: 26.4 km^{2} (10 sq mi)

Power Station
- Turbines: 2 x 25 MW
- Installed capacity: 50 MW

The Imha Dam is an embankment dam on the Banbyeoncheon River, a tributary of the Nakdong River, 14 km (9 mi) east of Andong in Gyeongsangbuk-do province, South Korea. The purpose of the dam is flood control, water supply and hydroelectric power generation. Construction on the dam began in 1987 and it was complete in 1991. The 73 m (240 ft) tall rock-fill, central earth-core dam creates a reservoir with a capacity of 595,000,000 m^{3} (482,374 acre⋅ft) and supplies a 50 MW power station with water. It supplies water for both municipal and industrial uses to Gumi, Dagu, Masan, Changwon, Jinhae, Ulsan, and Busan.

== Floating Solar Power Plant ==
In 2025, a 47 MW floating photovoltaic power plant was commissioned at the Imha Dam reservoir. Construction began in July of 2024. Designated as South Korea's first renewable energy cluster, the facility operates in conjunction with the existing hydroelectric station to supply solar power during the day and hydropower at night. The combined hybrid hydro and solar PV is expected to generate 61 GWh annually. The project was co-developed by Korea Hydro & Nuclear Power and the Korea Water Resources Corporation at a cost of KRW 73.2 billion ($50.2 million). The floating array features a unique design with 16 structures arranged to resemble the Korean flag and national flower. The project is notable for its "Sunlight Pension" community participation model, which allows approximately 4,500 local residents to share in the profits generated by the plant.

== See also ==
- List of power stations in South Korea
