= Nanning Power Station =

Nanning Power Station 南宁电厂
- Country: China
- Location: Nanning, Guangxi
- Purpose: Power
- Construction cost: ¥18.33 billion

Nanning Power Station (Chinese: 南宁电厂), also spelled Nanning Power Plant, is a large thermal power project located in Nanning, Guangxi, with a total investment of 18.33 billion yuan. Its predecessor was Nanning Electric Light Company (南宁电灯公司), which was jointly established in 1914 by Xu Dezhai (徐德斋) and Shan Mingfang (单名芳), with a factory located in Nanguo Street, Nanning City.

== History ==
In December 2009, the new construction project of Nanning Power Plant was approved by the National Development and Reform Commission, and on May 21, 2010, the main plant of the new construction of two 660,000 kW units of Nanning Power Plant was started.

On September 4, 2012, the second unit 2 of Nanning Power Plant passed the 168-hour full-load test running (168小时满负荷试运行), marking the official completion and operation of the first phase of Guodian Nanning Power Plant. The total investment of the project is about 4.56 billion yuan.
