= Hadong Power Station =

Korean power station

Hadong Power Plant
- Country: South Korea
- Coordinates: 34°57′09″N 127°49′17″E
- Operator: Korea Southern Power Company

Power generation
- Nameplate capacity: 4,000 MW

Hadong Power Station is a large coal-fired power station in South Korea.

== See also ==
- List of coal power stations
