= Qinzhou Power Station =

Coordinates: 21.7011°N 108.6239°E

Qinzhou Power Station 钦州电厂
- Location within Guangxi Location within China
- Country: China
- Location: Qinzhou, Guangxi
- Purpose: Power
- Construction began: May 23, 2005

Qinzhou Power Station (Chinese: 钦州电厂), also spelled Qinzhou Power Plant, is a Chinese thermal power plant located at Qinzhou Bay (钦州湾). It is a national key power construction project in China.

== History ==
The project of Qinzhou Power Station was approved by the National Development and Reform Commission (NDRC) on March 12, 2005, and its construction was officially started on May 23 of that year. The first unit of the first phase of the power plant was connected to the grid in July 2007, and the second unit was officially put into operation on November 2.

In July 2014, the second phase expansion project of Qinzhou Power Plant was approved by the National Development and Reform Commission.

In July 2020, State Development & Investment Corporation (SDIC) signed a strategic cooperation agreement with the People's Government of Guangxi Zhuang Autonomous Region (广西壮族自治区人民政府), and signed the "Investment Contract for the Phase III Project of SDIC Qinzhou Power Station" with the Government of Qinzhou City. The total investment for the third phase of the project is 11 billion yuan.
