= List of power stations in China =

The following page lists some power stations in mainland China, sorted by energy source and location.

== Coal ==
Station	Chinese name	Province	Coordinates	Total capacity (MW)	Units and status	Operator(s)
Beilun Power Station	北仑电厂	Zhejiang	29°56′26″N 121°48′48″E	5,000	5×600, 2×1000 operational	China Energy Investment Corporation
Shanghai Caojing Power Station	上海漕泾电厂	Shanghai	30°45′38.63″N 121°24′2.88″E	2,000	2×1000 operational	State Power Investment Corporation, Shanghai Electric
Jiaxing Power Station	嘉兴发电厂	Zhejiang	30°37′47″N 121°08′46″E	5,060	2×300, 4×600, 2×1000 operational	Zhejiang Jiahua
Ninghai Power Station	宁海电厂	Zhejiang	29°29′16″N 121°30′34″E	4,400	4×600, 2×1,000 operational	China Energy Investment Corporation
Shidongkou Power Station	石洞口发电厂	Shanghai	31°27′54.25″N 121°24′17.28″E	3,820	1×320, 3×300, 2×600, 2×660 operational	China Huaneng Group
Guohua Taishan Power Station	台山电厂	Guangdong	21°52′00″N 112°55′22″E	5,000	5×600, 2×1000 operational	China Energy Investment Corporation
Waigaoqiao Power Station	外高桥电厂	Shanghai	31°21′21″N 121°35′50″E	5,000	4×300, 2×900, 2×1000 operational	China Power Investment
Yangcheng Power Station	阳城电厂	Shanxi	35°28′11″N 112°34′41″E	4,620	6×350, 2×600 operational, 2×660 under construction	Datang International Power Generation Company
Qinbei power station	华能沁北电厂	Henan	35°10′3.36″N 112°42′59.4″E	4,400	4×600, 2×1000 operational	China Huaneng Group
Zouxian Power Station	邹县电厂	Shandong	35°19′36″N 116°56′02″E	4,400	4×335, 2×600, 2×1000 operational	Huadian Group
Houshi Power Station	后石电厂	Fujian	24°18′11″N 118°07′35″E	4,200	7×600 operational	Huayang Group
Yuhuan Power Station	玉环电厂	Zhejiang	28°06′57″N 121°08′16″E	4,200	4×1,050 operational	China Huaneng Group
Laizhou power station	华电莱州电厂	Shandong	37°25′55.99″N 120°1′5.16″E	4,078	2×1,039, 2×2,000 operational	Huadian
Jurong power station	华电句容电厂	Jiangsu	32°11′44.7″N 119°14′58.92″E	4,000	4×1,000	Huadian
Lingtai power station	灵台电站	Gansu	35°3′43.29″N 107°25′33.43″E	4,000	4×1,000 pre-permit development	Shandong Energy
Tianjin Beijiang power station	天津北疆电厂	Tianjin	39°13′9.55″N 117°55′47.64″E	4,000	4×1,000	SDIC Huajing Power Holdings
Jianbi Power Station	谏壁电厂	Jiangsu	32°10′54″N 119°34′35″E	3,980	6×300, 2×1000 operational	China Energy Investment Corporation
Hubei Ezhou power station	湖北鄂州电厂	Hubei	30°33′6.37″N 114°38′31.2″E	3,960	2×330, 2×650 operational	
Xinyuan Aluminum power station	鑫源铝业电站	Shandong	36°36′55.91″N 116°13′8.76″E	3,960	6×660 operational	Chiping Xinyuan Aluminum
Shajiao Power Station	沙角电厂	Guangdong	22°44′50″N 113°40′39″E	3,880	3×210, 2×300, 2×350, 3×660 operational	
Datong No2 Power Station	大同第二电厂	Shanxi	40°01′44″N 113°17′37″E	3,720	6×200, 2×600 operational, 2×660 under construction	China Energy Investment Corporation
Shangdu power station	华能上都电厂	Inner Mongolia	42°13′25.28″N 116°1′45.48″E	3,720	4×600, 2×660	China Huaneng Group, Beijing Energy Group
Wujiaqu power station	五家渠电站	Xinjiang	44°16′8.11″N 87°41′16.37″E	3,640	4×360, 2×1,100 operational	Xinfa Group
Suizhong Power Station	绥中电厂	Liaoning	40°04′48″N 120°00′27″E	3,600	2×800, 2×1,000 operational	Shenghua Energy
Shenhua Yuanyang Lake power station	申花鸳鸯湖电厂	Ningxia	38°3′27″N 106°41′29.04″E	3,520	2×660, 2×1,100	China Energy Investment
SDIC Qinzhou power station	国投钦州电厂	Guangxi	21°42′1.69″N 108°37′27.48″E	3,360	2×630, 2×1,050	SDIC Huajing Power Holdings
Xuzhou Pengcheng power station	徐州彭城电厂	Jiangsu	34°22′40.44″N 117°10′33.24″E	3,340	2×330, 2×340, 2×1,000 operational	China Resources
CPI Changshu-1 power station	中电国际常熟发电厂	Jiangsu	31°45′19.63″N 120°58′11.64″E	3,320	4×330, 2×1,000 operational	CPI
Huadian Ningxia Lingwu power station	华电宁夏灵武电厂	Ningxia	38°8′53.99″N 106°20′44.88″E	3,320	2×600, 2×1,060	Huadian
Hanchuan power station	汉川电厂	Hubei	30°39′23.8″N 113°55′2.28″E	3,320	2×300, 2×330, 2×1,000	China Energy Investment
Fujian Hongshan power station	神华福能鸿山电厂	Fujian	24°43′38.21″N 118°44′58.92″E	3,200	2×600, 2×1,000 operational	China Energy Investment
Chaozhou Sanbaimen power station	大唐潮州三百门发电	Guandong	23°33′58″N 117°05′49″E	3,200	2×600, 2×1,000 operational	Datang International Power Generation Company
Tuoketuo Power Station	托克托电厂	Neimenggu	40°11′49″N 111°21′52″E	6,720	8×600, 2×300, 2×660 operational	Datang International Power Generation Company
Huilai Power Station	惠来电厂	Guandong	23°00′20″N 116°32′48″E	3,200	2×600, 2×1,000 operational	Guangdong Yuedian
Dalate power station	华能北方联合电力达拉特发电厂	Inner Mongolia	40°22′1.02″N 109°59′45.6″E	3,180	6×330, 2×600 operational	China Huaneng Group
Xishan Gujiao power station	山西焦煤西山煤电古交电厂	Shanxi	37°53′32.17″N 112°5′29.16″E	3,120	2×300, 2×600, 2×660 operational	Shanxi Xingneng Electricity Power Co.
Tongling Power Station	铜陵电厂	Anhui	30°53′30″N 117°45′00″E	2,975	2×300, 2×660, 1×1,055 operational	Wanneng
Datang Sanmenxia power station	大唐三门峡发电公司	Henan	34°41′7.87″N 111°1′38.64″E	2,900	2×320, 2×630, 1×1,1000	Datang International Power Generation Company
Taicang Harbor Power Station	太仓港电厂	Jiangsu	31°35′05″N 121°15′25″E	2,770	2×135, 2×320, 2×330, 2×600 operational	Golden Concord
Fuzhou Power Station	福州电厂	Fujian	25°59′27″N 119°28′54″E	2,720	4×350, 2×660 operational	China Energy Investment Corporation
Ligang Power Station	利港电厂	Jiangsu	31°56′22″N 120°04′54″E	2,600	4×350, 2×600 operational	
Luohuang Power Station	珞璜电厂	Chongqing	29°20′55″N 106°26′05″E	2,600	4×350, 2×600 operational	
Zhuhai Power Station	珠海电厂	Guangdong	21°58′04″N 113°10′56″E	2,600	2×600, 2×700MW operational	Yuedian
Dezhou Power Station	德州电厂	Shandong	37°27′07″N 116°14′35″E	2,520	4×300, 2×660 operational	China Huaneng Group
Ningde Power Station	宁德电厂	Fujian	26°45′27″N 119°44′13″E	2,520	2×600, 2×660 operational	Datang International Power Generation Company
Yangzhou No2 Power Station	扬州第二电厂	Jiangsu	32°16′12″N 119°25′19″E	2,400	4×600 operational	Huaren
Wushashan Power Station	乌沙山电厂	Zhejiang	29°30′22″N 121°39′51″E	2,400	4×600, operational	Datang International Power Generation Company
Pingwei Power Station	平圩电厂	Anhui	32°41′03″N 116°54′05″E	4,400	4×600, 2×1,000, operational	CPI
Xibaipo Power Station	西柏坡电厂	Hebei	38°14′45″N 114°13′09″E	2,400	4×300, 2×600 operational	
Luohe Power Station	洛河电厂	Anhui	32°41′07″N 117°04′40″E	2,400	4×300, 2×600 operational	Datang International Power Generation Company
Fengcheng Power Station	丰城电厂	Jiangxi	28°11′45″N 115°42′31″E	2,400	4×300, 2×600 operational	China Energy Investment Corporation
Yangluo Power Station	阳逻电厂	Hubei	30°41′38″N 114°32′35″E	2,400	4×300, 2×600 operational	China Huaneng Group
Xiangfan Power Station	襄樊电厂	Hubei	31°54′57″N 112°10′10″E	2,400	4×300, 2×600 operational	Huadian
Guang'an Power Station	广安电厂	Sichuan	30°31′41″N 106°49′34″E	2,400	4×300, 2×600 operational	Huadian
Zhangjiakou Power Station	张家口电厂	Hebei	40°39′28″N 114°56′42″E	2,400	8×300 operational	Datang International Power Generation Company
Kemeng Power Station	可门电厂	Fujian	26°22′24″N 119°45′44″E	2,400	4×600 operational	Huadian
Zhanjiang Power Station	湛江电厂	Guangdong	21°18′35″N 110°24′34″E	2,400	4×300, 2×600 operational	Zhanjiang Electricity
Pingliang Power Station	平凉电厂	Gansu	35°30′06″N 106°47′10″E	2,400	4×300, 2×600 operational	China Huaneng Group
Jiangsu Nantong power station	江苏省南通市电站	Jiangsu	32°1′55.7″N 120°46′10.56″E	2,350	2×1,000 operational	China Energy Investment
Shouyangshan Power Station	首阳山电厂	Henan	34°43′53″N 112°45′21″E	2,240	2×220, 2×300, 2×600 operational	Datang International Power Generation Company, Huarun
Panshan Power Station	盘山电厂	Tianjin	39°58′55″N 117°27′40″E	2,200	2×500, 2×600 operational	Datang International Power Generation Company, China Energy Investment Corporation
Yimin Power Station	伊敏电厂	Neimenggu	48°33′01″N 119°46′40″E	2,200	2×500, 2×600 operational	China Huaneng Group
Jingyuan Power Station	靖远电厂	Gansu	36°43′46″N 104°45′37″E	2,150	4×220, 1×300, 2×330, 1×340 operational	China Energy Investment Corporation
Yuanbaoshan Power Station	元宝山电厂	Neimenggu	42°18′12″N 119°19′45″E	2,100	1×300, 3×600 operational	
Hezhou Power Station	贺州电厂	Guangxi	24°44′15″N 111°21′09″E	2,090		2×1,045
Wujing Power Station	吴泾电厂	Shanghai	31°03′31″N 121°27′56″E	2,075	1×100, 1×125, 2×300, 1×50, 2×600 operational	
Haimen Power Station	海门电厂	Guangdong	23°11′17″N 116°39′14″E	2,060	2×1,030 operational	China Huaneng Group
Pinghai Power Station	平海电厂	Guangdong	22°36′32″N 114°44′34″E	2,060	2×1,030 operational	Guangdong Yuedian, Zhujiang Investment
Shuangyashan Power Station	双鸭山电厂	Heilongjiang	46°33′55″N 131°40′18″E	2,030	1×200, 3×210, 2×600, operational	China Energy Investment Corporation
Taizhou Power Station	泰州电厂	Jiangsu	32°11′14″N 119°54′59″E	2,000	2×1,000 operational	China Energy Investment Corporation
Shentou No2 Power Station	神头第二电厂	Shanxi	39°22′04″N 112°32′00″E	2,000	4×500 operational	State Grid Energy Development Co.
Ordos Power Qipanjing power station	鄂尔多斯电力冶金股份棋盘井自备电厂	Inner Mongolia	39°23′6.86″N 106°57′56.52″E	1,960	4×330, 2×50, 3×135	Ordos Share Holding Group
Shuanghuai Power Station	重庆合川双槐电厂	Chongqing	30°09′41″N 106°32′53″E	1,920	2×300, 2×660 operational	China Power Investment
Buriqi power station	布里奇电站	Inner Mongolia	38°12′15″N 108°46′3.49″E	1,320	2×660 announced	
Shentou No1 Power Station	神头第一电厂	Shanxi	39°22′08″N 112°33′19″E	1,300	2×50, 6×200 operational	
Zhangjiagang Shazhou power station	永泰能源张家港沙洲发电厂	Jiangsu	31°59′23.03″N 120°41′16.44″E	1,260	2×630 operational	Wintime Energy
Dongming Plastic power station	东明塑胶电站	Xinjiang	44°41′18.64″N 89°6′49.82″E	200	2×100 operational	Xinjiang East Hope Dongming Plastic Co Ltd.

== Nuclear ==
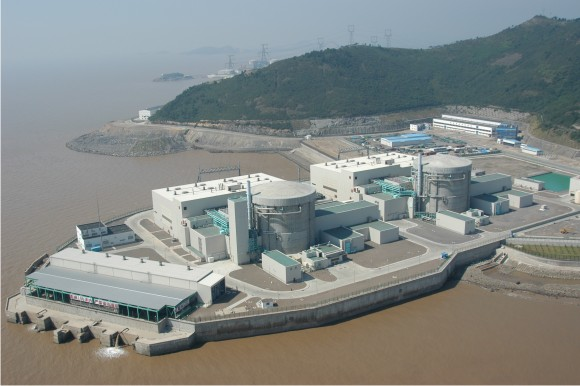
The Qinshan III (Units 1 & 2)

Station	Location	Coordinates	Capacity (MW)	Reactors	Notes
Changjiang Nuclear Power Plant	Changjiang, Hainan	19°27′38.7″N 108°53′59.70″E	1,300	2	
Daya Bay Nuclear Power Plant (大亚湾核电站)	Longgang District, Shenzhen, Guangdong Province	22°36′N 114°33′E	1,968	2	
Fangchenggang Nuclear Power Plant	Gangkou District, Fangchenggang, Guangxi	21°40′15″N 108°33′30″E	2,160	2	2 more reactors under construction
Fangjiashan Nuclear Power Plant (方家山核电站)	Zhejiang Province	30°26′29″N 120°56′30″E	2,178	2	2 more reactors under construction
Fuqing Nuclear Power Plant (福清核电站)	Fuqing, Fujian Province	25°26′53″N 119°27′2″E	6,150	6	
Haiyang Nuclear Power Plant (海阳核电站)	Haiyang, Shandong province	36°42.5′N 121°23′E	2,340	2	
Hongyanhe Nuclear Power Plant (红沿河核电站)	Wafangdian, Liaoning Province	39°48′7″N 121°28′30″E	6,710	6	
Ling Ao Nuclear Power Plant (岭澳核电站)	Longgang District, Shenzhen, Guangdong Province	22°36′17.24″N 114°33′05.36″E	3914	4	
Ningde Nuclear Power Plant (宁德核电站)	Fuding, Ningde, Fujian Province	27°2.7′N 120°17′E	4,320	4	2 more reactors planned
Qinshan Nuclear Power Plant (秦山核电站)	Haiyan County, Zhejiang Province	30°26′08″N 120°57′23″E	4,038	7	
Sanmen Nuclear Power Plant (三门核电站)	Sanmen County, Zhejiang Province	29°6′4″N 121°38′31″E	2,314	2	
Taishan Nuclear Power Plant (台山核电站)	Taishan, Guangdong Province	21°54′43″N 112°58′58″E	3,500	2	
Tianwan Nuclear Power Plant (田湾核电站)	Lianyungang, Jiangsu Province	34°41′13″N 119°27′35″E	6,080	6	2 more reactors under construction
Yangjiang Nuclear Power Station (阳江核电站)	Yangjiang, Guangdong Province	21°42′30″N 112°15′40″E	6,000	6	

== Hydroelectric ==
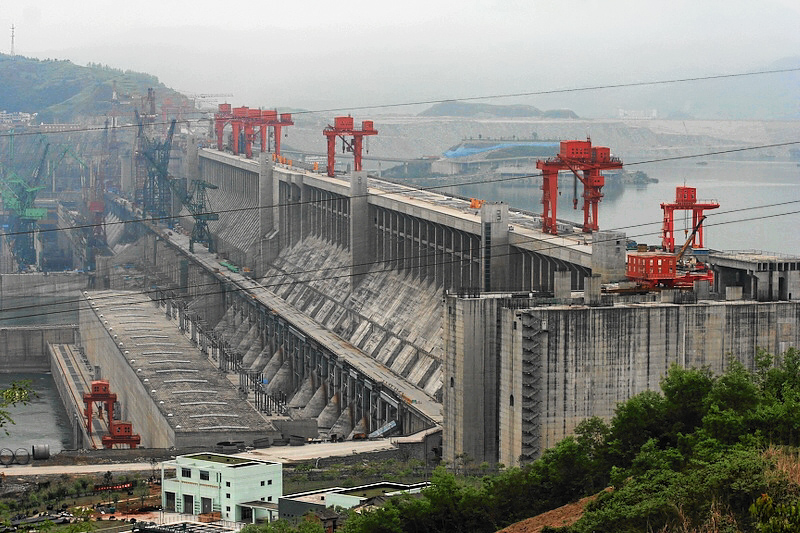
The Three Gorges Dam is the world's largest electricity-generating plant of any kind.

Station	Chinese name	Location	Coordinates	Capacity (MW)	Status	Type
Ahai Dam	阿海水电站		27°21′02″N 100°30′23″E	2,000	Operational	Conventional
Baihetan Dam	白鹤滩水电站		28°15′06″N 103°39′34″E	16,000	Operational	Conventional
Baishan Dam	白山水电站		42°43′35″N 127°13′25″E	1,800	Operational	Conventional
Bailianhe	白莲河抽水蓄能电站		30°36′15″N 115°26′52″E	1,224	Operational	Conventional
Banqiaoyu Dam				1,000	Proposed	
Baoquan II PS	宝泉抽水蓄能电站2期			1,200	Proposed	
Baoquan	宝泉抽水蓄能电站		35°27′27.2″N 113°27′53.7″E	1,200	Operational	Pumped storage
Ertan Dam	二滩水电站		26°49′15″N 101°46′52″E	3,300	Operational	Conventional
Fengning	丰宁抽水蓄能电站		41°39′58.35″N 116°31′43.63″E	3,600	Under construction	Pumped storage
Geheyan Dam	隔河岩水电站		30°28′03″N 111°8′18″E	1,200	Operational	Conventional
Gezhouba Dam	葛洲坝水利枢纽		30°44′23″N 111°16′20″E	2,710	Operational	Conventional
Goupitan Dam	构皮滩水电站		27°22′31″N 107°37′59″E	3,100	Operational	Conventional
Guangdong	广州抽水蓄能电站		23°45′52″N 113°57′12″E	2,400	Operational	Pumped storage
Heimifeng	黑麋峰抽水蓄能电站			1,200	Operational	Pumped storage
Hongping	洪坪抽水蓄能电站		29°3′58.99″N 115°19′6.16″E	2,400	Under construction	Pumped storage
Huanggou	荒沟抽水蓄能电站			1,200	Under construction	Pumped storage
Huating Lake	花凉亭水电站	Taihu County	30°28′02″N 116°14′51″E	40.0	Operational	Conventional
Hohhot	呼和浩特抽水蓄能电站			1,200	Under construction	Pumped storage
Huizhou	惠州抽水蓄能电站		23°16′07″N 114°18′50″E	2,400	Operational	Pumped storage
Jinghong Dam	景洪水电站		22°3′9″N 100°45′54″E	1,750	Operational	Conventional
Jinping-I Dam	锦屏一级水电站		28°11′07″N 101°37′42″E	3,600	Operational	Conventional
Jinping-II Dam	锦屏二级水电站		28°07′42″N 101°47′27″E	4,400	Operational	Conventional
Laxiwa Dam	拉西瓦水电站		36°04′18″N 101°11′14″E	4,200	Operational	Conventional
Lijiaxia Dam	李家峡水电站		36°07′06″N 101°48′28″E	2,000	Operational	Conventional
Liujiaxia Dam	刘家峡水电站		35°56′02″N 103°20′34″E	1,225	Operational	Conventional
Longtan Dam	龙滩水电站		25°01′38″N 107°02′51″E	6,300	Operational	Conventional
Longyangxia Dam	龙羊峡水电站		36°07′20″N 100°55′06″E	1,280	Operational	Conventional
Manwan Dam	漫湾水电站		24°37′20″N 100°26′56″E	1,750	Operational	Conventional
Nuozhadu Dam	糯扎渡水电站		22°39′22″N 100°25′06″E	5,850	Operational	Conventional
Panlong	蟠龙抽水蓄能电站			1,200	Under construction	Pumped storage
Pengshui Dam	彭水水电站	Wulong County	29°12′02″N 108°11′50″E	1,750	Operational	Conventional
Pubugou Dam	瀑布沟水电站		29°13′30″N 102°49′52″E	3,300	Operational	Conventional
Pushihe	蒲石河抽水蓄能电站			1,200	Operational	Pumped storage
Qingyuan	清远抽水蓄能电站			1,280	Operational	Pumped storage
Shenzhen	深圳抽水蓄能电站			1,200	Under construction	Pumped storage
Shisanling (Ming Toms)	十三陵抽水蓄能电站		40°15′50″N 116°16′23″E	800	Operational	Pumped storage
Shuibuya Dam	水布垭水电站		30°26′30″N 110°21′40″E	1,840	Operational	Conventional
Shuikou Dam	水口水电站		26°18′11″N 118°48′43″E	1,400	Operational	Conventional
Tai'an	泰安抽水蓄能电站			1,000	Operational	Pumped storage
Three Gorges Dam	三峡水利枢纽		30°49′15″N 111°00′08″E	22,500	Operational	
Tianchi	天池抽水蓄能电站			1,200	Under construction	
Tianhuangping	天荒坪抽水蓄能电站		30°28′13″N 119°36′21″E	1,800	Operational	Pumped storage
Tianhuangping II PS	天荒坪抽水蓄能电站2期			2,100	Proposed	
Tianshengqiao-I	天生桥1级水电站		24°56′29″N 105°6′25″E	1,200	Operational	
Tianshengqiao-II	天生桥2级水电站		24°54′47″N 105°9′19″E	1,320	Operational	
Tongbai	桐柏抽水蓄能电站			1,200	Operational	Pumped storage
Wendeng	文登抽水蓄能电站			1,800	Under construction	Pumped storage
Wudongde Dam	乌东德水电站		26°20′02″N 102°37′48″E	10,200	Operational	
Wulongshan	乌龙山抽水蓄能电站			2,400	Proposed	Pumped storage
Wuqiangxi Dam	五强溪水电站		28°46′33″N 110°55′25″E	1,200	Operational	
Wuyuanshan	婺源山抽水蓄能电站			1,500	Proposed	Pumped storage
Xiangjiaba Dam	向家坝水电站		28°38′27″N 104°27′37″E	7,750	Operational	
Xiangshuijian	响水涧抽水蓄能电站			1,000	Operational	Pumped storage
Xianyou	仙游抽水蓄能电站			1,200	Operational	Pumped storage
Xiaolangdi Dam	小浪底水利枢纽		34°55′26″N 112°21′55″E	1,836	Operational	
Xiaowan Dam	小湾水电站		24°42′11″N 100°05′31″E	4,200	Operational	
Xilongchi	西龙池抽水蓄能电站			1,200	Operational	Pumped storage
Xiluodu Dam	溪洛渡水电站		28°13′02″N 103°33′46″E	13,860	Operational	
Yangjiang	阳江抽水蓄能电站			2,400	Proposed	Pumped storage
Yantan Dam	岩滩水电站		24°02′26″N 107°30′43″E	1,212	Operational	
Yixing	宜兴抽水蓄能电站			1,000	Operational	Pumped storage
Yongtai	永泰抽水蓄能电站			1,200	Proposed	Pumped storage
Zangmu Dam	藏木水电站		29°11′06″N 92°31′00″E	510	Operational	
Zhanghewan	张河湾抽水蓄能电站			1,000	Operational	Pumped storage
Zhuhai	珠海抽水蓄能电站			1,800	Proposed	Pumped storage
Zulaishan	徂徕山抽水蓄能电站			1,800	Proposed	Pumped storage

== Solar ==
Name	Location	Capacity MW_{p}	Annual output GWh	Land size km^{2}	Year	Remarks	Ref
Tengger Desert Solar Park	37°33′00″N 105°03′14″E	1,547		43	2016	In Zhongwei, Ningxia	
Datong Solar Power Top Runner Base	40°04′25″N 113°08′12″E, 40°00′19″N 112°57′20″E	1,000			2016	Total capacity will be 3 GW in 3 phases.	
Longyangxia Dam Solar Park	36°10′54″N 100°34′41″E	850		23	2015	320 MW Phase I completed in December 2013, 530 MW phase II in 2015	
Huanghe Hydropower Golmud Solar Park	36°24′00″N 95°07′30″E	500		23	2014	Phase I completed in October 2011, followed by Phase II and III. 60 MW phase IV under construction. Within a group of 1,000 MW of co-located plants.	
Three Gorges Golmud Solar Park		500			2018		
Three Gorges Delingha Solar Park		500			2018		
Yanchi Solar Park	38.1633714°N 106.7611986°E	380	525		2016	Up to 2,000 MW when complete	
Cixi solar farm		200		3	2017	Mounted atop Changhe and Zhouxiang aquaculture reservoirs	
Gansu Jintai Solar Facility		200			2013	In Jin Chang, Gansu Province	
Gonghe Industrial Park Phase I		200			2013	Following phases with 550 MW planned	

== Tide ==
Station	Community	Coordinates	Capacity (MW)	Status	Ref
Jiangxia Tidal Power Station (江厦潮汐电站)		28°20′34″N 121°14′25″E	3.2	Operational	

== Wind ==
Station	Community	Coordinates	Capacity (MW)	Turbines	Status
Dabancheng Wind Farm	Ürümqi, Xinjiang		500		Operational
Danjinghe Wind Farm	Zhangbei County, Hebei Province		200	207	Operational
Gansu Wind Farm	Gansu Province	40°12′N 96°54′E	20,000		Under construction
Huitengliang Wind Farm	Huitengliang, inner Mongolia		300	200	Operational
Jilin Tongyu Tongfa Wind Farm	Tongyu County, Jilin Province		100.5	118	Operational
Shangyi Longyuan Wind Farm	Zhangjiakou, Hebei Province		150	100	Operational
Fancun Wind Farm	Yiyang, Henan Province		45		
Shangyi Qijiashan Wind Farm	Zhangjiakou, Hebei Province		199.5	133	Operational
Nan'ao Wind Farm	Shantou, Guangdong Province	23°26′N 117°14′E	171.7	236	Operational

== By location ==
The following pages list the major power stations in China by province:

- List of major power stations in Anhui
- List of major power stations in Beijing
- List of major power stations in Chongqing
- List of major power stations in Fujian province
- List of major power stations in Gansu
- List of major power stations in Guangdong
- List of major power stations in Guangxi
- List of major power stations in Guizhou
- List of major power stations in Hainan province
- List of major power stations in Hebei province
- List of major power stations in Heilongjiang
- List of major power stations in Henan province
- List of power stations in Hong Kong
- List of major power stations in Hubei province
- List of major power stations in Hunan province
- List of major power stations in Inner Mongolia
- List of major power stations in Jiangsu province
- List of major power stations in Jiangxi province
- List of major power stations in Jilin province
- List of major power stations in Liaoning province
- List of power stations in Macau
- List of major power stations in Ningxia
- List of major power stations in Qinghai province
- List of major power stations in Shaanxi
- List of major power stations in Shandong
- List of major power stations in Shanghai
- List of major power stations in Shanxi
- List of major power stations in Sichuan
- List of major power stations in Tianjin
- List of major power stations in the Tibet Autonomous Region
- List of major power stations in Xinjiang
- List of major power stations in Yunnan
- List of major power stations in Zhejiang

== See also ==
- Energy policy of China
- List of largest power stations in the world
- List of offshore wind farms in China
- Renewable energy in China
