= List of major power stations in Qinghai province =

This article lists the major power stations located in Qinghai province.

== Non-renewable ==
=== Coal-based ===
Station	Name in Chinese	Coordinates	Capacity (MW)	Operational units	Under construction units	Reference
Qiaotou Power Station	桥头电厂	36°54′17″N 101°42′48″E	2,580	2×300MW	3×660MW	
Xining Power Station	西宁电厂	36°35′03″N 101°29′36″E	1,320	2×660MW		
Geermu Power Station	格尔木电厂		1,320	2×660MW		
Xining Thermal Power Station	西宁热电厂	36°37′45″N 101°37′39″E	700	2×350MW		
Datong Power Station	大通电厂	36°54′51″N 101°42′22″E	600	2×300MW		
Xihai Power Station	西海电厂	36°58′26″N 100°54′39″E	250	2×125MW		

=== Natural gas-based ===
Station	Name in Chinese	Coordinates	Capacity (MW)	Operational units	Under construction units	Reference
Golmud Gas-fire Power Station	格尔木燃气电站	36°22′55″N 94°58′10″E	300	2×150MW (natural gas)		

== Renewable ==
=== Hydroelectric ===
==== Conventional ====
Station	Name in Chinese	Coordinates	River	Total capacity (MW)	Dam height (meters)	Status	Units
Jishixia Hydro Power Station	积石峡水电站	35°49′35″N 102°42′17″E	Yellow River	1,020	101	Operational	3×340MW
Suzhi Hydro Power Station	苏只水电站	35°52′22″N 102°20′12″E	Yellow River	225	51.56	Operational	3×75MW
Huangfeng Hydro Power Station	黄丰水电站	35°52′30″N 102°26′00″E	Yellow River	225	49	Operational	5×45MW
Gongboxia Hydro Power Station	公伯峡水电站	35°54′42″N 102°13′55″E	Yellow River	1,500	132.2	Operational	5×300MW
Kangyang Hydro Power Station	康扬水电站	36°03′25″N 101°56′49″E	Yellow River	284.9	36.5	Operational	7×40.7MW
Zhiganglaka Hydro Power Station	直岗拉卡水电站	36°06′42″N 101°52′23″E	Yellow River	190	42.5	Operational	5×38MW
Lijiaxia Hydro Power Station	李家峡水电站	36°07′07″N 101°48′30″E	Yellow River	2,000	175	Operational	5×400MW
Nina Hydro Power Station	尼那水电站	36°03′44″N 101°16′01″E	Yellow River	160	50.9	Operational	4×40MW
Laxiwa Hydro Power Station	拉西瓦水电站	36°04′12″N 101°11′05″E	Yellow River	4,200	250	Operational	6×700MW
Longyangxia Hydro Power Station	龙羊峡水电站	36°07′20″N 100°55′07″E	Yellow River	1,280	178	Operational	4×320MW
Yangqu Hydro Power Station	羊曲水电站	35°42′52″N 100°16′9″E	Yellow River	1,200	150	Operational	3×400MW
Banduo Hydro Power Station	班多水电站	35°18′36″N 100°16′28″E	Yellow River	360	78.72	Operational	3×120MW
Cihaxia Hydro Power Station	茨哈峡水电站		Yellow River	4,200		Proposed	6×700MW
Maerdang Hydro Power Station	玛尔档水电站	34°40′21″N 100°41′32″E	Yellow River	2,320	211	Operational	5×550MW

==== Pumped-storage ====
Station	Name in Chinese	Coordinates	Capacity (MW)	Rated head (meters)	Status	Operational units	Under construction units
Warang Pumped Storage Power Station	哇让抽水蓄能电站		2,800	428	Under construction		8×350 MW
Tongde Pumped Storage Power Station	同德抽水蓄能电站		2,400	366.5	Under construction		8×300 MW
Nanshankou Pumped Storage Power Station	南山口抽水蓄能电站		2,400	425	Under construction		8×300 MW

== See also ==
- List of power stations in China
