= List of major power stations in Hunan province =

This article lists the major power stations located in Hunan province.

== Non-renewable ==
=== Coal based ===
| Station | Name in Chinese | Coordinates | Capacity (MW) | Operational units | Under construction units | Reference |
|---|---|---|---|---|---|---|
| Yiyang Power Station | 益阳电厂 | 28°35′48″N 112°16′07″E | 3,800 | 2×300MW, 2×600MW | 2×1,000MW | |
| Shaanmei Shimen Power Station | 陕煤石门电厂 | 29°34′45″N 111°23′41″E | 2,640 | 4×330MW | 2×660MW | |
| Yueyang Power Station | 岳阳电厂 | 29°26′47″N 113°09′31″E | 2,525 | 2×300MW, 2×362.5MW, 2×600MW | | |
| Yongzhou Power Station | 神华国华永州电厂 | 26°34′3″N 111°29′36″E | 2,000 | 2×1,000MW | | |
| Pingjiang Power Station | 华电平江电厂 | 28°48′52″N 113°31′28″E | 2,000 | 2×1,000MW | | |
| Guohua Yueyang Power Station | 国华岳阳电厂 | 29°36′41″N 112°45′27″E | 2,000 | 2×1,000MW | | |
| Datang Zhuzhou Power Station | 大唐华银株洲电厂 | 27°27′45″N 113°7′11″E | 2,000 | | 2×1,000MW | |
| Shaanmei Miluo Power Station | 陕煤汨罗电厂 | 28°39′50″N 113°3′38″E | 2,000 | | 2×1,000MW | |
| Yuzhou Power Station | 湖南能源岳州电厂 | | 2,000 | | 2×1,000MW | |
| Liyujiang Power Station | 鲤鱼江电厂 | 25°56′30″N 113°12′59″E (A) 25°56′26″N 113°11′37″E (B) | 1,980 | 2×330MW (A), 2×660MW (B) | | |
| Xiangtan Power Station | 湘潭电厂 | 27°49′42″N 112°59′47″E | 1,900 | 2×350MW, 2×600MW | | |
| Jinzhushan Power Station | 金竹山电厂 | 27°37′34″N 111°28′55″E | 1,800 | 3×600MW | | |
| Changde Power Station | 常德电厂 | 28°56′15″N 111°44′13″E | 1,320 | 2×660MW | | |
| Baoqing Power Station | 宝庆电厂 | 27°12′09″N 111°23′48″E | 1,320 | 2×660MW | | |
| Youxian Power Station | 攸县电厂 | 27°14′40″N 113°27′42″E | 1,260 | 2×630MW | | |
| Changsha Power Station | 长沙电厂 | 28°29′21″N 112°47′49″E | 1,200 | 2×600MW | | |
| Leiyang Power Station | 耒阳电厂 | 26°23′08″N 112°51′31″E | 1,020 | 2×210MW, 2×300MW | | |
| Chenzhou Power Station | 国粤郴州电厂 | | 700 | 1×700MW | | |
| Zhuzhou Power Station | 株洲电厂 | 27°51′31″N 113°07′10″E | 620 | 2×310MW | | |
| Chuangyuan Power Station | 创元电厂 | 29°11′52″N 111°33′43″E | 600 | 2×300MW | | |
| Lianyuan Power Station | 涟源电厂 | 27°45′59″N 111°53′39″E | 600 | 2×300MW | | |

== Renewable ==
=== Hydroelectric ===
==== Conventional ====
| Station | Name in Chinese | Coordinates | River | Capacity (MW) | Dam height (meters) | Status | Operational units | Under construction units |
|---|---|---|---|---|---|---|---|---|
| Wuqiangxi Hydropower Station | 五强溪水电站 | 28°46′30″N 110°55′36″E | Yuan River | 1,200 | 87.5 | Operational | 5×240MW | |
| Zhexi Hydropower Station | 柘溪水电站 | 28°19′49″N 111°07′43″E | Zi River | 950 | 104 | Operational | 2×250MW, 6×75MW | |
| Tuokou Hydropower Station | 托口水电站 | 27°09′25″N 109°38′40″E | Yuan River | 830 | 82 | Operational | 3×84MW | |
| Fengtan Hydropower Station | 凤滩水电站 | 28°43′12″N 110°16′29″E | You River | 800 | 112.5 | Operational | 4×100MW, 2×200MW | |
| Dongjiang Hydropower Station | 东江水电站 | 25°52′24″N 113°18′34″E | Lei River | 500 | 157 | Operational | 4×125MW | |
| Jiangya Hydropower Station | 江垭水电站 | 29°32′26″N 110°44′23″E | Li River | 300 | 131 | Operational | 3×100MW | |
| Linjintan Hydropower Station | 凌津滩水电站 | 28°45′40″N 111°12′41″E | Yuan River | 270 | 52.05 | Operational | 9×30MW | |
| Wanmipo Hydropower Station | 碗米坡水电站 | 28°45′36″N 109°30′20″E | You River | 240 | 64.5 | Operational | 3×80MW | |
| Hongjiang Hydropower Station | 洪江水电站 | 27°08′03″N 109°57′49″E | Yuan River | 225 | 56 | Operational | 5×45MW | |
| Dafutan Hydropower Station | 大伏潭水电站 | 27°58′51″N 110°16′00″E | Yuan River | 195 | 52.05 | Operational | 9×30MW | |
| Tongwan Hydropower Station | 铜湾水电站 | 27°35′04″N 110°17′28″E | Yuan River | 180 | 42 | Operational | 4×45MW | |

==== Pumped-storage ====
| Station | Name in Chinese | Coordinates | Capacity (MW) | Rated head (meters) | Status | Operational units | Under construction units |
|---|---|---|---|---|---|---|---|
| Anhua Pumped Storage Power Station | 安化抽水蓄能电站 | 28°07′59″N 111°46′45″E | 2,400 | 424 | Under construction | | 8×300MW |
| Guanghanping Pumped Storage Power Station | 广寒坪抽水蓄能电站 | 27°18′33″N 113°40′45″E | 1,800 | 408 | Under construction | | 6×300MW |
| Pingjiang Pumped Storage Power Station | 平江抽水蓄能电站 | 28°28′12″N 113°43′54″E | 1,400 | 647 | Under construction | | 4×350MW |
| Heimifeng Pumped Storage Power Station | 黑麋峰抽水蓄能电站 | 28°27′35″N 113°00′36″E | 1,200 | | Operational | 4×300MW | |
| Yanling Pumped Storage Power Station | 炎陵罗萍江抽水蓄能电站 | | 1,200 | 366 | Under construction | | 4×300MW |
| Muwangxi Pumped Storage Power Station | 桃源木旺溪抽水蓄能电站 | | 1,200 | 392 | Under construction | | 4×300MW |

== See also ==
- List of power stations in China
