= List of major power stations in Jiangxi province =

This article lists the major power stations located in Jiangxi province.

== Non-renewable ==
=== Coal-based ===
Station	Name in Chinese	Coordinates	Capacity (MW)	Operational units	Units under construction	Reference
Fengcheng Power Station	丰城电厂	28°11′38″N 115°42′35″E	4,520	4×300MW, 2×660MW, 2×1,000MW		
Shenhua Jiujiang Power Station	神华九江电厂	29°49′33″N 116°22′33″E	4,000	4×1,000MW		
Fuzhou (JX) Power Station	抚州电厂	27°47′06″N 116°33′47″E	4,000	2×1,000MW	2×1,000MW	
Xinfeng Power Station	信丰电厂	25°16′55″N 114°54′50″E	3,320	2×660MW	2×1,000MW	
Fenyi Power Station	分宜电厂	27°57′31″N 114°44′58″E	3,320	2×660MW	2×1,000MW	
Ruijin Power Station	瑞金电厂	25°55′28″N 115°06′09″E	2,700	2×350MW, 2×1,000MW		
Xinyu Power Station	新余电厂	27°41′15″N 114°57′02″E	2,000	2×1,000MW		
Shanggao Power Station	上高电厂	28°11′2″N 114°49′27″E	2,000	2×1,000MW		
Shangrao Power Station	上饶电厂	28°16′47″N 117°52′1″E	2,000	2×1,000MW		
Jingangshan Power Station	井冈山电厂	27°02′48″N 115°01′10″E	1,920	2×300MW, 2×660MW		
Guixi Power Station	贵溪电厂	28°17′18″N 117°13′21″E	1,800	2×300MW, 2×600MW		
Guodian Jiujiang Power Station	国电九江电厂	29°44′25″N 116°02′10″E	1,360	2×350MW, 1×660MW		
Jingdezhen Power Station	景德镇电厂	29°11′17″N 117°05′08″E	1,320	2×660MW		
Xinchang Power Station	新昌电厂	28°51′40″N 115°58′41″E	1,320	2×660MW		
Anyuan Power Station	安源电厂	27°38′53″N 114°0′16″E	1,320	2×660MW		
Huangjinbu Power Station	黄金埠电厂	28°27′02″N 116°51′36″E	1,200	2×600MW		

== Renewable ==
=== Hydroelectric ===
==== Conventional ====
Station	Name in Chinese	Coordinates	River	Capacity (MW)	Dam height (meters)	Status	Units	Reference
Wan'an Hydropower Station	万安水电站	26°26′41″N 114°47′40″E	Ganjiang	500	58	Operational	5×100MW	
Zhelin Hydropower Station	柘林水电站	29°12′34″N 115°29′57″E	Xijiang	420	63.5	Operational	4×45MW, 2×120MW	
Xiajiang Dam	峡江水利枢纽	27°31′02″N 115°07′51″E	Ganjiang	360	15.2	Operational	8×45MW	
Longtoushan Dam	龙头山水电站	28°13′53″N 115°47′51″E	Ganjiang	240		Operational	8×60MW	
Xingan Dam	新干航电枢纽	27°54′42″N 115°26′21″E	Ganjiang	112		Operational	7×16MW	

==== Pumped-storage ====
Station	Name in Chinese	Coordinates	Total capacity (MW)	Rated head (meters)	Operational units	Units under construction	Planned units
Hongping Pumped Storage Power Station	洪屏抽水蓄能电站	29°04′30″N 115°19′10″E	2,400	540		4×300MW	4×300MW
Fengxin Pumped Storage Power Station	奉新抽水蓄能电站		1,200	505	Under construction		4×300MW

== See also ==
- List of power stations in China
