= List of major power stations in Shandong =

This article lists the major power stations located in Shandong Province.

== Non-renewable ==
=== Coal based ===
Station	Name in Chinese	Coordinates	Capacity (MW)	Operational units	Under construction units
Weiqiao Power Station	魏桥集团自备电厂	36°54′03″N 117°46′56″E	6,600	4×330MW, 8×660MW	
Chiping Xinyuan Aluminum Power Station	茌平信源铝业有限公司茌平自备电厂	36°36′51″N 116°13′19″E	6,060	3×700MW, 6×660MW	
Zouxian Power Station	邹县电厂	35°19′31″N 116°55′42″E	4,540	4×335MW, 2×600MW, 2×1000MW	
Dezhou Power Station	德州电厂	37°27′07″N 116°14′35″E	2,670	4×300MW, 2×700MW	
Weiqiao Huji Power Station	魏桥胡集电厂	37°21′00″N 117°46′42″E	2,640	8×330MW	
Changshan Power	邹平长山电厂	36°53′41″N 117°51′40″E	2,640	8×330MW	
Laiwu Power Station	莱芜电厂	36°08′11″N 117°41′14″E	2,600	2×300, 2×1000MW	
Liaocheng Power Station	聊城电厂	36°29′22″N 115°49′41″E	2,530	2×600MW, 2×650MW	
Shiliquan Power Station	十里泉电厂	34°48′52″N 117°34′23″E	2,220	1×125MW, 2×300MW, 2×660MW	
Rizhao Power Station	日照电厂	35°20′40″N 119°30′40″E	2,060	2×350MW, 2×680MW	
Weihai Power Station	威海电厂	37°26′56″N 122°12′25″E	2,060	2×350MW, 2×680MW	
Huangdao Power Station	黄岛电厂	36°02′18″N 120°13′10″E	2,050	2×135MW, 2×230MW, 2×660MW	
Weifang Power Station	潍坊电厂	36°39′54″N 119°15′51″E	2,000	2×330MW, 2×670MW	
Laizhou Power Station	莱州电厂	37°25′56″N 120°01′05″E	2,000	2×1000MW	
Nanshan Group Power Station	南山集团自备电厂	37°43′44″N 120°26′53″E	2,000	1×120MW, 3×150MW, 2×220MW, 3×330MW	
Shouguang Power Station	寿光电厂	37°16′04″N 118°54′26″E	2,000	2×1000MW	
Dongying Power Station	大唐东营电厂	38°06′49″N 118°54′36″E	2,000	2×1000MW	
Zhongxing Penglai Power Station	中兴蓬莱电厂	37°46′11″N 120°36′36″E	2,000		2×1000MW
Yuncheng Power Station	大唐郓城电厂	35°31′4″N 115°57′30″E	2,000		2×1000MW
Boxing Power Station	国家能源博兴发电有限公司	37°16′30″N 118°19′50″E	2,000		2×1000MW
Heze (Guodian) Power Station	国电菏泽电厂	35°14′30″N 115°32′03″E	1,510	2×125MW, 2×300MW, 2×330MW	
Jünan Liyuan Thermal Power Station	莒南力源热电厂	35°10′19″N 119°02′14″E	1,400	4×350MW	
Huangtai Power Station	黄台电厂	36°42′29″N 117°05′18″E	1,360	2×330MW, 2×350MW	
Bajiao Power Station	八角电厂	37°41′37″N 121°07′38″E	1,340	2×670MW	
Longkou Power Station	龙口电厂	37°40′47″N 120°18′50″E	1,320	2×660MW	
Changqing Power Station	济南热电长清电厂	36°31′51″N 116°50′55″E	1,320	2×660MW	
Weiqiao Binzhou Industrial Park Power Station	滨州绿动热电	37°20′46″N 117°53′31″E	1,320	4×330MW	
Weiqiao 2nd Power Station	邹平宏利热电	37°01′30″N 117°29′2″E	1,320	4×330MW	
Weiqiao Beihai Power Station	魏桥北海汇宏电厂	38°01′20″N 117°58′22″E	1,320	4×330MW	
Luxi Power Station	山东鲁西发电煤炭地下气化发电工程	35°20′36″N 116°47′06″E	1,320	2×660MW	
Shiheng Power Station	石横电厂	36°12′47″N 116°30′46″E	1,200	4×300MW	
Laicheng Power Station	莱城电厂	36°15′19″N 117°40′20″E	1,200	4×300MW	
Qingdao Power Station	青岛电厂	36°06′45″N 120°19′42″E	1,200	4×300MW	
Feixian Power Station	费县电厂	35°19′18″N 117°54′13″E	1,200	2×600MW	
Heze (Huarun) Power Station	华润菏泽电厂	35°15′12″N 115°40′56″E	1,200	2×600MW	
Xintai Power Station	山东能源集团新泰电厂	35°49′17″N 117°45′20″E	1,200		2×600MW
Shengli Oil Field Power Station	胜利油田自备电厂	37°24′05″N 118°31′52″E	1,040	2×200MW, 2×300MW, 1×40MW (fuel)	
Tengzhou Power Station	滕州电厂	35°04′05″N 117°07′15″E	1,000	2×150MW, 2×350MW	
Nanding Power Station	南定电厂	36°45′35″N 118°03′13″E	910	2×125MW, 2×330MW	
Baiyanghe Power Station	白杨河电厂	36°28′19″N 117°50′33″E	890	2×145MW, 2×300MW	
Linqing Power Station	临清热电厂	36°52′30″N 115°46′17″E	700	2×350MW	
Binzhou Power Station	大唐滨州电厂	37°28′02″N 118°02′49″E	700	2×350MW	
Jining Huaneng Power Station	华能济宁电厂	35°28′09″N 116°42′23″E	700	2×350MW	
Dongjiakou Thermal Power Station	华能董家口热电厂	35°36′22″N 119°46′50″E	700	2×350MW	
Lubei Power Station	鲁北电厂	38°04′55″N 117°44′33″E	660	2×330MW	
Liaocheng Thermal Power Station	聊城热电厂	36°28′04″N 115°54′39″E	660	2×330MW	
Xingdian Power Station	辛店电厂	36°46′57″N 118°14′09″E	600	2×300MW	
Penglai Power Station	蓬莱电厂	37°45′17″N 120°35′40″E	660	2×330MW	

Gas-based

Station	Name in Chinese	Coordinates	Capacity (MW)	Operational units	Under construction units
Huadian Qingdao Natural Gas Power Station	华电青岛天然气热电联产工程	36°06′45″N 120°19′55″E	1,011MW	2×505.54MW	
Huaneng Yantai Natural Gas Power Station	华能烟台燃机发电		980MW		2×490MW
Huadian Zhangqiu Natural Gas Power Station	华电章丘燃机热电	36°06′45″N 120°19′55″E	800MW	2×400MW	

=== Nuclear-based ===
Station	Name in Chinese	Coordinates	Capacity (MW)	Operational reactors	Under construction reactors	Reference
Haiyang Nuclear Power Plant	海阳核电站	36°42′33″N 121°22′54″E	5,006	2×1250MW (AP1000)	2×1253MW (CAP1000)	
Shidao Bay Nuclear Power Plant	石岛湾核电厂	36°58′20″N 122°31′44″E	3,310	1×210MW (HTG)	2×1550MW (CAP-1400)	
Laiyang Nuclear Power Plant	莱阳核电站		3,086		2x1,543MW	

== Renewable ==
=== Hydroelectric ===
==== Pumped-storage ====
Station	Name in Chinese	Coordinates	Capacity (MW)	Rated head (meters)	Status	Operational units	Under construction units
Wendeng Pumped-storage Hydro Power Station	文登抽水蓄能电站	37°12′52″N 121°47′25″E	1,800	386	Operational	6×300MW	
Tai'an Pumped Storage Power Station Phase 2	泰安二期抽水蓄能电站	36°13′19″N 117°02′31″E	1,800	454	UC		6×300MW
Yimeng Pumped Storage Power Station	沂蒙抽水蓄能电站	35°25′36″N 118°04′48″E	1,200	386	Operational	4×300MW	
Weifang Pumped Storage Power Station	潍坊抽水蓄能电站	36°22′10″N 118°18′30″E	1,200	240	UC		4×300MW
Tai'an Pumped Storage Power Station	泰安抽水蓄能电站	36°13′19″N 117°02′31″E	1,000	225	Operational	4×250MW	

=== Wind ===
Wind power has become the fastest growing new energy resource in Shandong province. By February 2010, there were 24 operational wind farms with an electricity power capacity of 1,010MW. Shandong plans to build several off-shore wind farms that are over 1,000MW.

== See also ==
- List of power stations in China
