= List of major power stations in Shaanxi =

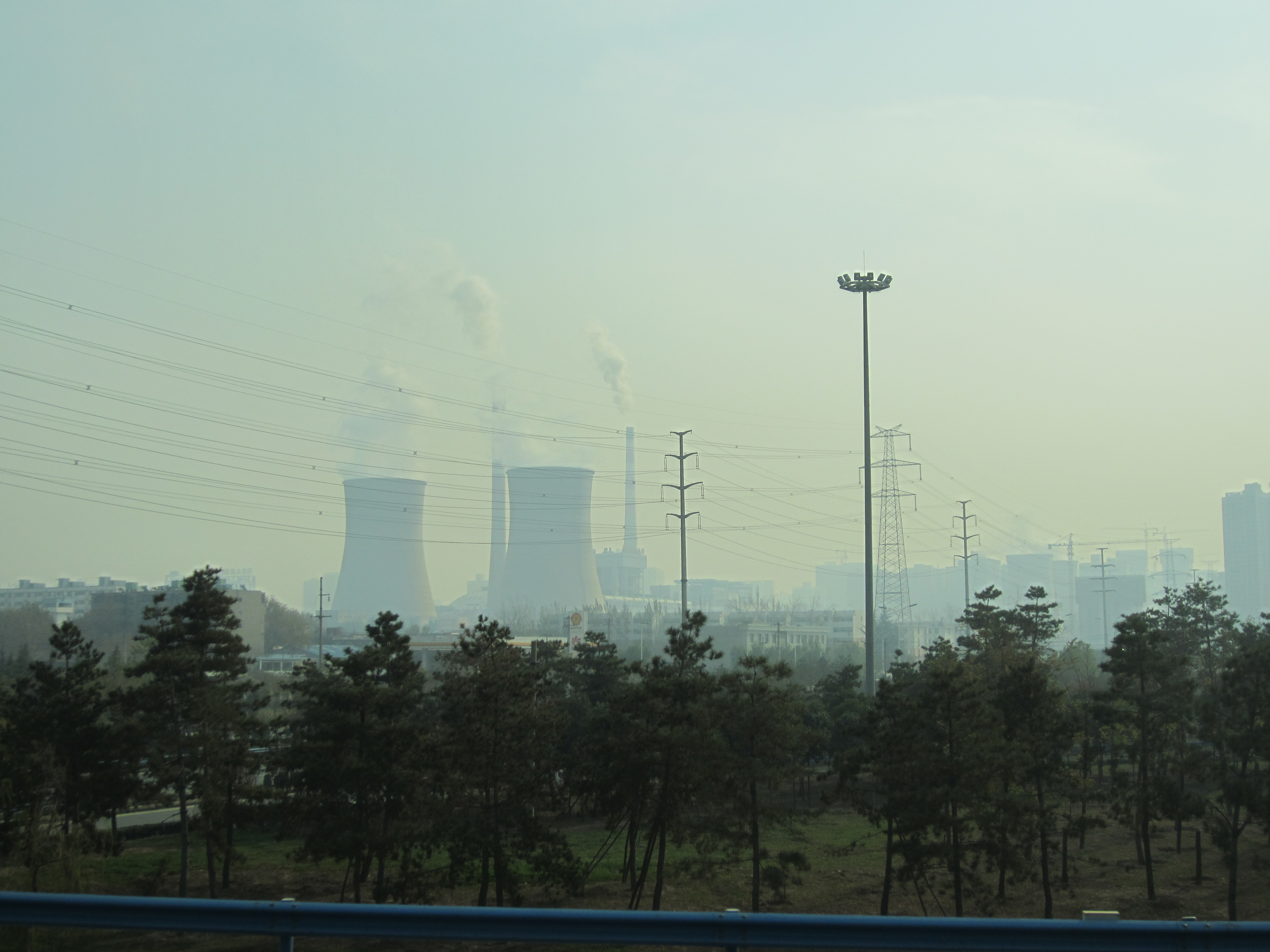
Coal power plant in Baqiao

This article lists the major power stations located in Shaanxi province.

== Non-renewable ==
=== Coal, gas and fuel-oil-based ===
Station	Name in Chinese	Coordinates	Capacity (MW)	Operational units	Under construction units	Reference
Fuxian Power Station	延长石油富县电厂	35°51′40″N 109°12′46″E	4,000	2×1,000MW	2×1,000MW	
Leilongwan Power Station	雷龙湾电厂	37°55′32″N 109°06′01″E	4,000	2×1,000MW	2×1,000MW	
Jinjie Power Station	锦界电厂	38°44′10″N 110°10′01″E	3,720	4×600MW	2×660MW	
Diantou Power Station	店头电厂	35°39′22″N 109°02′59″E	3,320	2×660MW	2×1,000MW	
Shangluo Power Station	商洛电厂	33°48′27″N 110°03′53″E	2,640	4×660MW		
Qingshuichuan Power Station	府谷清水川煤电一体化项目	39°12′12″N 111°07′11″E	2,600	2×300MW, 2×1,000MW		
Pucheng Power Station	蒲城电厂	34°58′42″N 109°47′56″E	2,520	4×330MW, 2×600MW		
Shenhua Fugu Power Station	神华国神府谷电厂	39°12′33″N 110°47′09″E	2,520	2×600MW, 2×660MW		
Hancheng No2 Power Station	韩城第二电厂	35°35′58″N 110°33′24″E	2,400	4×600MW		
Qinling Power Station	秦岭电厂	34°31′48″N 109°56′32″E	2,120	4×200MW, 2×660MW		
Hengshan Power Station	榆能横山煤电一体化项目电厂	38°01′59″N 109°24′51″E	2,000	2×1,000MW		
Youser Group Power Station	陕西有色榆林铝镁合金项目电厂	38°31′55″N 109°52′50″E	1,650	5×330MW		
Dianta Power Station	店塔电厂	38°58′26″N 110°27′03″E	1,590	2×135MW, 2×660MW		
Yuneng Yanghuopan Power Station	榆能杨伙盘煤电一体化电厂	39°03′14″N 110°31′28″E	1,320	2×660MW		
Binchang Power Station	神华国能彬长电厂	35°06′36″N 108°07′27″E	1,320		2×660MW	
Hongdunjie Power Station	枣矿红墩界电厂	37°53′25″N 108°55′00″E	1,320		2×660MW	
Datang Xiwangzhai Power Station	大唐西王寨煤电一体化		1,320		2×660MW	
Yan'an Power Station	华能延安电厂	35°49′34″N 109°18′16″E	1,320	2×660MW		
Deyuan Fugu Power Station	德源府谷电厂	39°10′43″N 111°05′08″E	1,200	2×600MW		
Tongchuan Power Station	铜川电厂	34°50′58″N 108°53′21″E	1,200	2×600MW		
Weihe Power Station	渭河电厂	34°25′41″N 108°54′41″E	1,200	4×300MW		
Baoji No2 Power Station	宝鸡第二电厂	34°29′47″N 107°13′11″E	1,200	4×300MW		
Yuheng Power Station	榆横电厂	38°08′03″N 109°32′13″E	1,200	2×600MW		
Baqiao Power Station	灞桥热电厂	34°17′07″N 109°03′01″E	850	2×125MW, 2×300MW		
Fuping Thermal Power Station	富平热电厂	34°43′11″N 109°13′20″E	700	2×350MW		
Linyou North Thermal Power Station	陕能麟北发电厂	34°54′28″N 107°33′11″E	700	2×350MW		
Yan'an Thermal Power Station	延安热电厂	36°41′26″N 109°40′39″E	700	2×350MW		
Yulin Thermal Power Station	榆神榆林热电	38°17′57″N 109°48′40″E	700		2×350MW	
Weinan Thermal Power Station	渭南热电联产	34°35′22″N 109°26′23″E	700		2×350MW	
Yangling Power Station	杨凌热电厂	34°15′32″N 108°07′00″E	660	2×330MW		
Lueyang Power Station	略阳电厂	33°20′48″N 106°08′33″E	660	2×330MW		

== Renewable ==
=== Hydroelectric ===
==== Conventional ====
Station	Name in Chinese	Coordinates	River	Capacity (MW)	Dam height (meters)	Status	Operational units	Under construction units
Ankang Hydro Power Station	安康水电站	32°36′15″N 108°53′33″E	Han River	852.5	128	Operational	4×200 MW, 1×52.5 MW	
Xunyang Hydro Power Station	旬阳水电站	32°48′51″N 109°22′17″E	Han River	320	54	Operational	4×80 MW	
Chuhe Hydro Power Station	蜀河水电站	32°55′37″N 109°41′52″E	Han River	276	66	Operational	6×46 MW	
Xihe Hydro Power Station	喜河水电站	32°50′30″N 108°17′16″E	Han River	180	60.8	Operational	3×60 MW	
Tianqiao Hydro Power Station	天桥水电站	39°03′51″N 111°07′58″E	Yellow River	128	42	Operational	2×28 MW, 2×36 MW	

==== Pumped storage ====
Station	Name in Chinese	Coordinates	Capacity (MW)	Rated head (meters)	Status	Operational units	Under construction units
Zhen'an Pumped Storage Hydro Power Station	镇安抽水蓄能电站	33°31′41″N 108°39′59″E	1,400	440	Under construction		4×350 MW

== See also ==
- List of power stations in China
