= Shanghai Caojing Power Station =

Coal-fired power plant in Shanghai, China

Shanghai Caojing Power Station 上海漕泾电厂
- Country: China
- Location: Shanghai
- Coordinates: 30°45′38.63″N 121°24′2.88″E
- Status: Operational
- Construction began: August 2006
- Commission date: 2010
- Owners: State Power Investment Corporation, Shanghai Electric

Thermal power station
- Primary fuel: Coal

Power generation
- Units operational: 2 × 1000 MW
- Nameplate capacity: 2,000 MW

External links
- Website: Shanghai Electric Power Co.

The Shanghai Caojing Power Station (Chinese: 上海漕泾电厂) is a coal-fired power station in Jinshan District, Shanghai, China. The plant has an installed capacity of 2,000 MW. The station generates energy by two 1,000 MW units, which is fuelled by coal. The plant has a 210-metre chimney on-site.

The plant is operated by State Power Investment Corporation and Shanghai Electric and was created as a supporting project for Expo 2010 Shanghai China.

== See also ==
- List of coal power stations
- List of major power stations in Shanghai
- List of power stations in China
