= List of major power stations in Beijing =

This article lists the major power stations located in Beijing.

== Non-renewable ==
=== Coal based ===
Station	Name in Chinese	Coordinates	Capacity (MW)	Operational units and (type)	Under construction units	Reference
Beijing Huaneng Thermal Power Station	华能北京热电厂	39°53′09″N 116°31′54″E	880	4×220 MW, 1.76 million tonnes/year		

=== Natural gas based ===
Station	Name in Chinese	Coordinates	Capacity (MW)	Operational units and (type)	Underconstructed units	Reference
Beijing Huaneng Thermal Power Station	华能北京热电厂	39°53′08″N 116°32′21″E	1,921	2×461.5 MW, 2×499 MW (Mitsubishi)		
Datang Gaojing Thermal Power Station	大唐高井热电厂	39°56′28″N 116°07′29″E	1,380	3×460 MW (GE 9FB)		
Beijing Jingxi Thermal Gas Power Center	北京京西燃气热电	39°56′33″N 116°07′37″E	1,307.8	3×436 MW (Siemens SGT5)		
Beijing Shenghua Guohua Thermal Gas Power Center	神华国华北京燃气热电	39°57′16″N 116°37′06″E	950.98	2×475.5 MW (Mitsubishi)		
Beijing Jingneng Gaoantun Thermal Gas Power Center	北京京能高安屯燃气热电	39°57′05″N 116°37′08″E	845	2×422.5 MW (Siemens SGT5)		
Beijing SW Thermal Gas Power Center	西南燃气热电中心	39°49′58″N 116°21′07″E	838	2×419 MW (Siemens SGT5)		
Beijing Taiyanggong Thermal Power Station	太阳宫燃气热电厂	39°58′42″N 116°26′19″E	780	2×390 MW (GE 9FA)		
Beijing Huadian Thermal Gas Power Center	华电北京(郑常庄)热电	39°53′22″N 116°16′21″E	508	2×254 MW (Siemens SGT5)		
Beijing Jingfeng Gas Power Center	北京京丰燃气发电	39°48′46″N 116°08′36″E	400	1×400 MW (Mitsubishi)		
Beijing Weilai Gas Thermal Power Station	北京京能未来燃气热电	40°06′05″N 116°28′05″E	255	1×255 MW (Siemens SGT5)		
Huarun Xiexing Thermal Power Station	华润协鑫(北京)热电	39°46′52″N 116°30′07″E	150	2×75 MW (Pratt & Whitney)		
Beijing Zhengdong Electronics Power Station	北京正东电子动力集团	39°57′49″N 116°29′16″E	122	2×42 MW (GE ), 1×38.4 MW (KHI)		

== Renewable ==
=== Hydroelectric ===
==== Pumped-storage ====
Station	Name in Chinese	Coordinates	Status	Capacity (MW)	Height difference (meters)	Operational units	Under construction units
Shisanling Pumped Storage Power Station	十三陵抽水蓄能电站	40°15′50″N 116°16′23″E	Operational	800	430	4×200 MW	

=== Wind ===
Station	Name in Chinese	Coordinates	Operational capacity (MW)	Status	Units	Reference
Guanting Wind Power Farm	官厅风电场		64.5	Operational	43×1.5 MW	

== See also ==
- List of power stations in China
