= List of major power stations in Shanghai =

Below is a list of the major power stations in Shanghai, China.

== Thermal power stations ==
Coal-based

Station	Name in Chinese	Coordinates	Capacity (MW)	Operational units	Under construction units
Waigaoqiao Power Station	外高桥电厂	31°21′21″N 121°35′50″E	5,000	4×300MW, 2×900MW, 2×1000MW	
Caojing Power Station	漕泾电厂	30°45′36″N 121°23′59″E	4,700	2×1000MW, 2×350(IGCC)	2×1000MW
Shidongkou Power Station	石洞口电厂	31°27′49″N 121°24′15″E	3,600	4×300MW, 4×600MW	
Wujing Power Station	吴泾电厂	31°03′31″N 121°27′56″E	2,400	4×300MW, 2×600MW	2×300MW
Baosteel Power Station	宝山钢铁自备电厂	31°26′41″N 121°26′10″E	1,200	1×150MW, 3×350MW	
Shanghai Petrochemical Power Station	上海石化自备电厂	30°41′55″N 121°16′40″E	375		

Natural gas based

Station	Name in Chinese	Coordinates	Capacity (MW)	Operational units	Under construction units
Lingang LNG Power Station	临港燃气电厂	30°51′03″N 121°47′16″E	1,400	4×350MW	
Minghang LNG Power Station	闵行燃机示范工程	30°59′26″N 121°22′39″E	1,213	1x468MW, 1x745MW	
Shidongkou Power Station	石洞口电厂	31°27′49″N 121°24′15″E	1,197	3×399MW	
Chongming LNG Power Station	崇明燃气电厂	31°35′18″N 121°28′28″E	848	2×424MW	
Fengxian LNG Power Station	奉贤燃机电厂	30°58′33″N 121°29′46″E	720	4×180MW	
Shanghai Chemical Industry Thermal Power Station	上海化工区热电联供	30°47′33″N 121°27′00″E	656	2×328MW	

== Wind power ==
Station	Name in Chinese	Coordinates	Operational capacity (MW)	Operational units	Under construction units	Planned units
Donghai Bridge Wind Power Farm*	东海大桥海上风电场	30°45′43″N 122°0′15″E	102	34×3MW		
Nanhui Wind Power Farm	南汇风电场	30°57′31″N 121°55′13″E	16.5	11×1.5MW		
Chongming Dongtan Wind Power Farm	崇明东滩风电场	31°31′14″N 121°55′57″E	4.5	3×1.5MW	10×1.5MW	
Chongming Beiyan Wind Power Farm	崇明北沿风电场	31°35′41″N 121°50′30″E				24×2MW
Fengxian Bay Wind Power Farm	奉贤海湾风电场	30°48′53″N 121°30′36″E	3.4	4×0.85MW	4×2MW	

- Donghai Bridge Wind Power Farm is the first marine wind power farm in China.

== Solar power ==
Station	Name in Chinese	Coordinates	Operational capacity (kW)	Under construction capacity (kW)	Planned units (kW)
Hongqiao Transportation Hub Solar Power Station	虹桥车站太阳能电站	31°11′45″N 121°18′58″E	6,688		
Chongming Solar Photovoltaic Power Station	崇明太阳能光伏电站	31°43′18″N 121°30′38″E	1,046		
Shanghai Lingang Solar Photovoltaic Power Station	上海临港太阳能光伏电站	30°53′08″N 121°49′28″E	1,080		

== See also ==
- List of power stations in China
