= List of major power stations in Zhejiang =

This article lists the major power stations located in Zhejiang Province.

== Non-renewable ==
=== Coal ===
Station	Name in Chinese	Coordinates	Capacity (MW)	Operational units	Under construction units
Beilun Power Station	北仑电厂	29°56′26″N 121°48′48″E	7,400	5×660 MW, 2×1,050 MW	2×1,000 MW
Jiaxing Power Station	嘉兴电厂	30°37′47″N 121°08′46″E	6,300	2×300 MW, 4×600 MW, 3×1,000 MW	
Yuhuan Power Station	玉环电厂	28°06′57″N 121°08′16″E	5,000	5×1,000 MW	
Yueqing Power Station	乐清电厂	28°10′15″N 121°05′26″E	4,520	2×600 MW, 2×660 MW, 2×1,000 MW	
Ninghai Power Station	宁海电厂	29°28′57″N 121°30′34″E	4,400	4×600 MW, 2×1,000 MW	
Taizhou Second Power Station	台州第二电厂	29°00′48″N 121°41′48″E	4,100	2×1,000 MW, 2×1050 MW	
Liuheng Power Station	六横电厂	29°45′34″N 122°07′34″E	4,000	4×1,000 MW	
Cangnan Power Station	苍南电厂	27°29′54″N 120°39′44″E	3,000	2×1,000 MW	1×1,000MW
Wenzhou Power Station	温州电厂	27°59′47″N 120°50′09″E	2,520	4×300 MW, 2×660 MW	
Lanxi Power Station	兰溪电厂	29°11′12″N 119°30′23″E	2,400	4×600 MW	
Wushashan Power Station	乌沙山电厂	29°30′22″N 121°39′51″E	2,400	4×600 MW	
Zhoushan Power Station	舟山电厂	30°06′13″N 122°11′04″E	2,020	2×350 MW, 2×660 MW	
Changxing Power Station	长兴电厂	30°59′31″N 119°55′47″E	1,320	2×660 MW	
Yushan Power Station	中煤岱山鱼山电厂		1,320	2×660 MW	
Rongsheng Jintang Power Station	荣盛金塘电厂		1,320		2×660 MW
Toumenggang Power Station	头门港电厂		1,320		2×660 MW
Zhenghai Power Station	镇海电厂	30°02′47″N 121°39′25″E	1,320	2×660 MW	
Taizhou Power Station	台州电厂	28°41′52″N 121°27′13″E	1,260	2×300 MW, 2×330 MW	
Shaoxing Binghai Thermal Power Station	绍兴滨海热电厂	30°13′36″N 120°43′04″E	600	2×300 MW	

=== Gas ===
Station	Name in Chinese	Coordinates	Capacity (MW)	Operational units	Under construction units
Anji Natural Gas Power Station	安吉燃气发电厂	30°48′4″N 119°44′40″E	1,634	2×817 MW	
Zhenhai Natural Gas Power Station	浙能镇海天然气燃机发电	30°1′21″N 121°39′39″E	1,560	2×350 MW, 2×430 MW	
Zhoushan Natural Gas Power Station	舟山燃气发电厂		1,490	2×745 MW	
Datang Jinhua Power Station	大唐金华天然气发电厂	29°07′43″N 119°33′15″E	1,470	2×735 MW	
Banshan Power Station	半山电厂	30°21′40″N 120°08′44″E	1,170	3×390 MW	
Xiaoshan Power Station	萧山电厂	30°03′03″N 120°13′56″E	1,170	3×390 MW	
Changxing Natural Gas Power Station	长兴天然气热电	30°58′48″N 119°55′14″E	870	2×435 MW	
Tongxiang Natural Gas Power Station	桐乡燃机电厂	30°35′36″N 120°21′27″E	400	2×200 MW	

Nuclear

=== Nuclear ===
Station	Name in Chinese	Coordinates	Capacity installed and under construction (MW)	Operational reactors and (type)	Under construction reactors	Planned reactors
Qinshan Nuclear Power Plant	秦山核电站	30°26′25″N 120°56′59″E	310	1×310 MW (PWR)		
Qinshan Nuclear Power Plant No2	秦山第二核电站	30°25′17″N 120°56′37″E	2,600	2×650 MW (PWR), 2×650 MW (PWR)		
Qinshan Nuclear Power Plant No3	秦山第三核电站	30°26′10″N 120°57′28″E	1,456	2×72 8MW (PHWR)		
Sanmen Nuclear Power Station	三门核电站	29°06′04″N 121°38′23″E	2,200	2×1,100 MW (PWR)		4×1,100 MW
Fangjiashan Nuclear Power Plant	方家山核电站	30°26′27″N 120°56′27″E	2,160	2×1080 MW (PWR)		
Cangnan Nuclear Power Station	三澳核电站	27°12′10″N 120°31′1″E	2,400		2×1,200 MW	
Jinqimeng Nuclear Power Station	金七门核电站	29°03′21″N 121°57′7″E	2,200		2×1,000 MW	

- China's first indigenously designed and constructed nuclear power plant

== Renewable ==
=== Hydroelectric ===
==== Conventional ====
Station	Name in Chinese	Coordinates	River	Capacity (MW)	Dam height (meters)	Status	Units
Xin'anjiang	新安江水电站	29°29′01″N 119°12′51″E	Xin'an	662.5	105	Operational	4×75 MW, 5×72.5 MW
Fuchunjiang	富春江水电站	29°42′35″N 119°39′08″E	Xin'an	297.2	47.7	Operational	4×60MW, 1×57.2MW
Tankeng	滩坑水电站	28°07′10″N 120°02′00″E	Ou	600	162	Operational	3×200 MW
Jinshuitan	紧水滩水电站	28°12′44″N 119°32′11″E	Ou	300	102	Operational	6×50 MW

==== Pumped-storage ====
Station	Name in Chinese	Coordinates	Capacity (MW)	Height difference (meters)	Status	Operational units	Under construction units
Changlongshan Pumped Storage Power Station	长龙山抽水蓄能电站	30°29′17″N 119°36′30″E	2,100	710	Operational	6×350 MW	
Tianhuangping Pumped Storage Power Station	天荒坪抽水蓄能电站	30°28′08″N 119°36′04″E	1,800	590	Operational	6×300 MW	
Jinyun Pumped Storage Power Station	缙云抽水蓄能电站	28°32′01″N 120°10′30″E	1,800	589	UC		4×425 MW
Tiantai Pumped Storage Power Station	天台抽水蓄能电站	29°10′36″N 121°08′35″E	1,700	724	UC		6×300 MW
Xianju Pumped Storage Power Station	仙居抽水蓄能电站	28°38′30″N 120°24′41″E	1,500	447	Operational	4×375 MW	
Ninghai Pumped Storage Power Station	宁海抽水蓄能电站	29°23′57″N 121°35′30″E	1,400	459	Operational	4×350 MW	
Songyang Pumped Storage Power Station	松阳抽水蓄能电站		1,400	481	UC		4×350 MW
Tonglu Pumped Storage Power Station	桐庐抽水蓄能电站		1,400	531	UC		4×350 MW
Jingning Pumped Storage Power Station	景宁抽水蓄能电站		1,400	643	UC		4×350 MW
Tongbai Pumped Storage Power Station	桐柏抽水蓄能电站	29°12′00″N 121°00′40″E	1,200	244	Operational	4×300 MW	
Qujiang Pumped Storage Power Station	衢江抽水蓄能电站	28°46′22″N 118°53′33″E	1,200	415	UC		4×300 MW
Pan'an Pumped Storage Power Station	磐安抽水蓄能电站	28°59′12″N 120°35′39″E	1,200	421	UC		4×300 MW
Qingtian Pumped Storage Power Station	青田抽水蓄能电站		1,200	410	UC		4×300 MW
Taishun Pumped Storage Power Station	泰顺抽水蓄能电站		1,200	444	UC		4×300 MW
Yongjia Pumped Storage Power Station	永嘉抽水蓄能电站		1,200	577	UC		4×300 MW
Jinshuitan Pumped Storage Power Station	紧水滩抽水蓄能电站		297		UC		1×297 MW
Wuxijiang Pumped Storage Power Station	乌溪江混合式抽水蓄能电站		297		UC		

==== Tidal ====
Station	Name in Chinese	Coordinates	Capacity (MW)	Under construction units	Planned units
Jiangxia	江厦潮汐电站	28°34′08″N 121°14′24″E	3.9	1×500 kW, 1×600 kW, 4×700 kW	

=== Wind ===
Station	Name in Chinese	Coordinates	Capacity (MW)	Generator units	Under construction units	Planned units
Cixi	慈溪风电场	30°16′51″N 121°26′46″E	49.5	33×1500 kW		
Kuocangshan	括苍山风电场	28°48′25″N 120°55′03″E	21.3	33×600 kW, 2×750 kW		
Hedingshan	鹤顶山风电场	27°18′50″N 120°26′07″E	20.35	5×600 kW, 8×850 kW, 2×1000 kW, 13×600 kW, 3×250 kW		
Tiantaishan	天台山风电场		10.92	14×780 kW		
Donghaitan	东海塘风电场	28°27′11″N 121°35′53″E	40	20×2000 kW		
Dongtou	洞头风电场	27°49′47″N 121°06′17″E	13.5	18×750 kW		
Xiangshan	象山海上风电场					150 MW
Chuanshan	穿山风电场					30×1500 kW

=== Solar ===
Location	Location in Chinese	Coordinates	Capacity (MW)
Jiangshan	江山市	28°31′54″N 118°31′16″E	
Changshan	常山县	28°51′09″N 118°20′59″E	
Huzhou	湖州市	30°57′00″N 119°51′07″E 30°57′45″N 120°01′27″E 30°49′03″N 119°58′40″E 30°46′13″N 120°09′01″E 30°45′47″N 120°10′39″E 30°44′41″N 120°10′18″E	

== See also ==
- List of power stations in China
