= List of major power stations in Inner Mongolia =

This page lists the major power stations located in Inner Mongolia.

== Non-renewable ==
=== Coal-based ===
Station	Name in Chinese	Coordinates	Capacity (MW)	Operational	Under construction	Reference
Tuoketuo Power Station	托克托电厂	40°11′42″N 111°21′29″E	6,120	8×600MW, 2×660MW		
Dalate Power Station	达拉特电厂	40°21′58″N 109°59′49″E	4,180	6×330MW, 2×600MW	1×1,000MW	
Shuangwei Power Station	双维电厂	38°19′16″N 106°43′16″E	4,000	4×1,000MW		
Jinshan Thermal Power Station	内蒙古能源金山热电厂	40°42′26″N 111°27′27″E	3,920	2×300MW, 2×660MW	2×1,000MW	
Shangdu Power Station	上都电厂	42°13′27″N 116°01′41″E	3,720	4×600MW, 2×660MW		
Yimin Power Station	伊敏电厂	48°32′59″N 119°46′26″E	3,400	2×500MW, 4×600MW		
Jinlian Aluminum Power Station	锦联铝材自备电厂	45°24′47″N 119°35′52″E	3,040	2×200MW, 4×660MW		
Huineng Changchuan Power Station	汇能长川电厂	39°36′43″N 111°11′8″E	2,640	4×660MW		
Kubuqi Desert Power Station	库布齐沙漠送电上海工程煤电项目		2,640		4×660MW	
Xilinhot Mengneng Power Station	锡林浩特热电厂	43°59′04″N 116°07′50″E	2,620	2×300MW, 2×350MW	2×660MW	
Daihai Power Station	岱海电厂	40°31′14″N 112°40′04″E	2,460	2×600MW， 2×630MW		
Fengzhen Power Station	华能北方联合电力丰镇发电厂	40°24′15″N 113°08′35″E	2,400	6×200MW, 2×660MW		
Yuanbaoshan Power Station	元宝山电厂	42°18′12″N 119°19′27″E	2,100	1×300MW, 3×600MW		
Jingneng Jining Thermal Power Station	京能集宁热电联产电厂	41°03′12″N 113°09′21″E	2,020	2×350MW, 2×660MW		
Shenglu Power Station	盛鲁电厂	38°22′23″N 106°46′25″E	2,000	2×1,000MW		
Wulaigai Power Station	乌拉盖电厂	45°57′23″N 119°6′25″E	2,000		2×1,000MW	
Zhunda Power Station	内蒙古能源集团准大电厂	40°1′24″N 111°10′9″E	2,000		2×1,000MW	
Ordos Beijiao Thermal Power Station	鄂尔多斯北骄热电厂	39°50′49″N 109°59′07″E	1,980	2×330MW, 2×660MW		
Inner Mongolia Chuangyuan Metal Power Station	内蒙古创源金属有限公司自备电厂	45°26′14″N 119°25′37″E	1,980	6×330MW		
Junggar Suancigou Power Station	京泰酸刺沟电厂	39°42′40″N 111°11′56″E	1,920	2×300MW, 2×660MW		
Hongjun Power Station	霍煤鸿骏铝电自备电厂	45°29′59″N 119°39′16″E	1,800	2×100MW, 2×150MW 2×300MW, 2×350MW		
Baotou Aluminum Smelter Plant Power Station	包头铝业自备电厂	40°33′26″N 110°08′54″E	1,750	5x350MW		
Tongliao Power Station	通辽电厂	43°40′17″N 122°09′17″E	1,400	4×200MW, 1×600MW		
Xilinhot Datang Power Station	大唐锡林浩特电厂	44°01′16″N 116°10′23″E	1,320	2×660MW		
Shenghua Shengli Power Station	神华北电胜利能源	43°59′44″N 116°09′00″E	1,320	2×660MW		
Keyouzhong Mengneng Power Station	蒙能集团科右中发电厂	44°57′38″N 121°24′19″E	1,320	2×660MW		
Guohua Zhungeer Power Station	国华准格尔电厂	39°51′12″N 111°15′26″E	1,320	4×330MW		
Bulian Power Station	布连电厂	39°18′02″N 109°58′07″E	1,320	2×660MW		
Helin Power Station	和林电厂	40°16′36″N 112°09′44″E	1,320	2×660MW		
Baotou East Hope Aluminum Smelter Plant Power Station	包头希望铝业自备电厂	40°35′39″N 109°46′56″E	1,320	4×155MW, 2×350MW		
Huarun Wujianfang Power Station	华润电力五间房电厂	44°36′04″N 116°41′54″E	1,320	2×660MW		
Jingneng Wujianfang Power Station	京能五间房电厂	44°36′05″N 116°42′14″E	1,320	2×660MW		
Weijiamao Power Station	魏家峁电厂	39°33′26″N 111°22′01″E	1,320	2×660MW		
Zhujiaping Power Station	朱家坪电厂	39°36′14″N 111°22′07″E	1,320	2×660MW		
Jingneng Chagandaoer Power Station	京能查干淖尔电厂	43°32′56″N 115°08′37″E	1,320	2×660MW		
Huaneng Shengli Power Station	华能北方胜利电厂	43°59′58″N 116°06′44″E	1,320	2×660MW		
Baiyinhua SPIC Pithead Power Station	白音华国家电投坑口电厂	44°47′52″N 118°30′44″E	1,320	2×660MW		
Tumd Power Station	华电土右电厂	40°35′00″N 110°37′22″E	1,320	2×660MW		
Zhongmei Manglai Power Station	中煤芒来电厂	44°18′03″N 113°18′22″E	1,320	2×660MW		
Qipanjing Power Station	棋盘井电厂	39°23′10″N 106°58′06″E	1,260	2×65MW, 2×135MW, 2×200MW, 4×330MW		
Huolinhe Pithead Power Station	霍林河坑口电厂	45°30′26″N 119°39′00″E	1,200	2×600MW		
Huadian Baotou Power Station	华电包头电厂	40°34′09″N 109°47′21″E	1,200	2×600MW		
Ewenke Power Station	鄂温克电厂	48°43′48″N 119°56′26″E	1,200	2×600MW		
Baorixile Power Station	宝日希勒电厂	49°20′52″N 119°43′14″E	1,200	2×600MW		
Baiyinhua Jinshan Pithead Power Station	华电白音华金山电厂	44°55′55″N 118°42′29″E	1,200	2×600MW		
Daban Power Station	大板电厂	43°35′18″N 118°42′46″E	1,200	2×600MW		
Hohhot Power Station	呼和浩特电厂	40°47′33″N 111°35′50″E	1,100	2×350MW, 2×200MW		
Haibowan Power Station	华能北方联合电力海勃湾发电厂	39°19′01″N 106°51′49″E	1,060	2×200MW, 2×330MW		
Baotou No2 Thermal Power Station	包头第二热电厂	40°40′38″N 109°53′24″E	1,000	2×200MW, 2×300MW		
Shenghua Zhungeer Gangue Power Station	神华准格尔能源矸石电厂	39°49′40″N 111°15′58″E	960	2×330MW, 2×150MW		
Shenghua Yili Power Station	神华亿利自备	40°21′41″N 109°58′21″E	800	4×200MW		
Zhuozi Power Station	卓资电厂	40°55′18″N 112°38′23″E	800	4×200MW		
Shengle Power Station	盛乐电厂	40°33′43″N 111°51′48″E	700	2×350MW		
Shuangxin Power Station	双欣电厂	39°54′17″N 106°47′00″E	700	2×350MW		
Chifeng Power Station	赤峰经开热电联产	42°16′24.38″N 119°08′48″E	700	2×350MW		
Baiyinhua Aluminum Smelting Power Station	国家电投集团内蒙古白音华煤电有限公司铝电分公司自备电厂	44°47′29″N 118°30′32″E	700	2×350MW		
Kangbashi Thermal Power Station	京能康巴什热电厂	39°35′52″N 109°54′33″E	700	2×350MW		
Xinhengfeng Power Station	新恒丰电厂	40°57′46″N 110°05′10″E	700	2×350MW		
Dongyuan Power Station	东源科技低热值煤自备电厂	39°29′05″N 106°41′54″E	700		2×350MW	
Manzhouli Thermal Power Station	满洲里热电厂	49°23′53″N 117°38′38″E	700	2×350MW		
Jingke Power Station	内蒙古源源能源集团京科发电厂	44°58′55″N 121°25′28″E	680	1×330MW, 1×350MW		
Xing'an Thermal Power Station	兴安热电厂	46°05′39″N 122°01′22″E	680	2×340MW		
Dongsheng Power Station	东胜电厂	39°49′22″N 110°02′04″E	660	2×330MW		
Hangjin Power Station	杭锦电厂	39°55′12″N 109°06′56″E	660	2×330MW		
Bayanhaote Thermal Power Station	巴彦浩特热电厂	38°48′53″N 105°43′24″E	660	2×330MW		
Jinhai Waste Coal Power Station	京海煤矸石电厂	39°39′30″N 106°51′43″E	660	2×330MW		
Baotou Donghua Thermal Power Station	华电包头东华热电厂	40°34′44″N 110°04′25″E	640	2×320MW		
Xinfeng Thermal Power Station	新丰热电厂	40°28′14″N 113°05′13″E	600	2×300MW		
Jinqiao Power Station	金桥电厂	40°42′32″N 111°44′26″E	600	2×300MW		
Wusitai Power Station	乌斯太电厂	39°26′46″N 106°40′05″E	600	2×300MW		
Wuda Power Station	乌达电厂	39°28′47″N 106°44′09″E	600	2×300MW		
Mengxi Power Station	蒙西电厂	39°53′33″N 106°45′58″E	600	2×300MW		
China Resources Dengkou Thermal Power Station	华润磴口金牛发电厂	40°23′01″N 107°00′17″E	600	2×300MW		
Linhe Thermal Power Station	临河热电厂	40°46′56″N 107°29′28″E	600	2×300MW		
Salaqi Power Station	萨拉齐电厂	40°31′59″N 110°33′54″E	600	2×300MW		
Baotou No1 Thermal Power Station	包头第一热电厂	40°39′24″N 109°39′27″E	600	2×300MW		
Baotou No3 Thermal Power Station	包头第三热电厂	40°37′27″N 110°00′12″E	600	2×300MW		
Wulashan Power Station	乌拉山电厂	40°39′04″N 108°46′04″E	600	2×300MW		
Zhungeer Dafanpu Pithead Power Station	准格尔大饭铺坑口电厂	39°47′10″N 111°09′37″E	600	2×300MW		
Mengtai Buliangou Power Station	蒙泰不连沟煤业电厂	40°02′06″N 111°17′08″E	600	2×300MW		
Junzheng Wuhai Power Station	君正乌海电厂	39°27′56″N 106°42′04″E	500	2×150MW, 1×200MW		
Xilaifeng Power Station	神华乌海能源公司西来峰发电厂	39°22′14″N 106°53′34″E	400	2×200MW		
Wuhai Thermal Power Station	北方联合电力乌海热电厂	39°42′25″N 106°49′48″E	400	2×200MW		
Jining Thermal Power Station	集宁热电厂	41°01′10″N 113°09′35″E	300	2×150MW		
Shenghua Coal liquefaction Thermal Power Station	神华煤制油自备热电厂	39°19′44″N 110°09′07″E	200	2×100MW		

=== Natural gas-based ===
Station	Name in Chinese	Coordinates	Capacity (MW)	Operational	Under construction
Sulige Natural Gas Power Station	苏里格燃气发电厂	38°32′22″N 108°48′48″E	300	2×150MW	

== Renewable ==
=== Hydroelectric ===
==== Conventional ====
Station	Name in Chinese	Coordinates	River	Total capacity (MW)	Dam height (meters)	Status	Operational units	Under construction units	Planned units
Wanjiazhai Hydro Power Station	万家寨水电站	39°34′43″N 111°25′42″E	Yellow River	1,080	105	Operational	6×180MW		
Longkou Hydro Power Station	龙口水电站	39°25′11″N 111°17′34″E	Yellow River	420	51	Operational	4×100MW, 1×20MW		

==== Pumped-storage ====
Station	Name in Chinese	Coordinates	Capacity (MW)	Rated head (meters)	Status	Operational units	Under construction units
Hohhot Pumped Storage Power Station	呼和浩特抽水蓄能电站	40°59′14″N 111°41′18″E	1,200	521	Operational	4×300MW	
Zhirui Pumped Storage Power Station	芝瑞抽水蓄能电站	42°52′45″N 117°48′36″E	1,200	443	Under construction		4×300MW
Wuhai Pumped Storage Power Station	乌海抽水蓄能电站	42°52′45″N 117°48′36″E	1,200	411	Under construction		4×300MW

=== Wind ===
Inner Mongolia has the largest wind power capacity in China. The installed capacity was over 7,300MW in 2010.

Station	Name in Chinese	Coordinates	Operational capacity (MW)	Status	Units	Reference
Huitengxile Wind Power Farm	辉腾锡勒风电场	41°11′34″N 112°36′41″E	>1,085	Operational		
Zhurihe Wind Power Farm	朱日河风电场			Operational		
Shangdu Wind Power Farm	商都风电场			Operational		
Xilinhot Wind Power Farm	锡林浩特风电场	43°56′02″N 116°5′9.7″E		Operational		
Dali Wind Power Farm	达里风电场			Operational		
Saihanba Wind Power Farm	赛罕坝风电厂			Operational		
Keshiketeng Wind Power Farm	克什克腾风电厂			Operational		
Huitengliang Wind Power Farm	灰腾梁风电厂			Operational		
Yongsheng Wind Power Farm	永盛风电厂			Operational		
Duolun Wind Power Farm	多伦风电厂			Operational		
Xianghuangqi Wind Power Farm	镶黄旗风电厂			Under construction		
Wulanhua Wind Power Farm	四子王旗乌兰花风电场			Operational		
Alatanemol Wind Poweer Farm	阿拉坦额莫勒风电场			Operational		
Aorigehu Wind Poweer Farm	熬日格呼风电场			Operational		

=== Solar ===
As of 2020, Inner Mongolia had 12,370 MW of solar power installed.

== See also ==
- List of power stations in China
