= Guangdong Pumped Storage Power Station =

- Overview rendition of the PSPS
- Interactive map of Guangdong Pumped Storage Power Station
- Official name: 广州抽水蓄能电站
- Country: China
- Location: Lütian town, Conghua District, Guangdong
- Coordinates: 23°45′52″N 113°57′12″E
- Status: Operational
- Construction began: Stage I: 1989; Stage II: 1994
- Opening date: Stage I: 1994; Stage II: 2000

Upper reservoir
- Creates: Guangdong Upper
- Total capacity: 24,080,000 m^{3} (19,522 acre⋅ft)

Lower reservoir
- Creates: Guangdong Lower
- Total capacity: 23,400,000 m^{3} (18,971 acre⋅ft)

Power Station
- Hydraulic head: 535 m (1,755 ft) (max. gross)
- Pump-generators: 8 × 300 MW (400,000 hp)
- Installed capacity: 2,400 MW (3,200,000 hp)

The Guangdong Pumped Storage Power Station or Guangzhou Pumped Storage Power Station (Chinese: 广州抽水蓄能电站) is a pumped-storage hydroelectric power station near Guangzhou, Guangdong Province, China. Power is generated by utilizing eight turbines, each with a 300-megawatt (400,000 hp) capacity, totalling the installed capacity to 2,400 megawatts (3,200,000 hp). The generated power is sold to CLP customers in Hong Kong. The power station was constructed in two stages, the first four turbines were completed in 1994 and the second four in 2000.

== Operation ==
The station is composed mainly of a lower and upper reservoir and an underground power station. Water for the system is derived from the Liuxihe River. The lower reservoir has a capacity of 23,400,000 cubic metres (19,000 acre⋅ft) and is created by a 43.5-metre (143 ft) tall and 153.12-metre (502 ft) long gravity dam composed of roller-compacted concrete. Water from this reservoir is pumped into the upper reservoir which is created by a 68-metre (223 ft) tall and 318.52-metre (1,045 ft) long concrete face rock-fill embankment dam and has a capacity of 23,400,000 cubic metres (19,000 acre⋅ft). Water from the upper reservoir can then be re-released down two penstocks towards the power station. The same reversible pumps that moved the water up can now generate electricity. Just before reaching the power station, the two penstocks each split off into four separate branch pipes, each feeding one of the eight reversible 300 MW turbine generators with water. Once power generation is complete, the generators can reverse, pump the water back up to the upper reservoir and resume the process over again.

== See also ==
- Huizhou Pumped Storage Power Station
- List of power stations in China
