= List of major power stations in Anhui =

This article lists the major power stations located in Anhui province.

== Non-renewable ==
=== Coal based ===
Station	Name in Chinese	Coordinates	Capacity (MW)	Operational units	Under construction units
Pingwei Power Station	平圩电厂	32°41′03″N 116°54′05″E	6,540	2×630MW, 2×640MW, 2×1,000MW	2×1,000MW
Anqing Power Station	安庆电厂	30°32′25″N 117°10′18″E	4,600	2×300MW, 2×1,000MW	2×1,000MW
Luohe Power Station	淮南洛能电厂	32°41′07″N 117°04′40″E	3,800	2×300MW, 2×600MW, 2×1,000MW	
Banji Power Station	板集电厂	32°53′44″N 116°14′34″E	3,320	2×1,000MW, 2×660MW	
Tongling Wanneng Power Station	皖能铜陵电厂	30°52′59″N 117°45′47″E	2,920	2×300MW, 2×660MW, 1×1,000MW	
Pingshan Power Station	平山电厂	33°50′02″N 116°49′52″E	2,670	2×660MW, 1×1,350MW	
Panji Power Station	潘集电厂	32°46′06″N 116°45′32″E	2,640	4×660MW	
Liu'an Power Station	六安电厂	31°39′22″N 116°29′32″E	2,640	2×660MW	2×660MW
Bangbu Power Station	蚌埠电厂	32°47′04″N 117°06′53″E	2,520	2×600MW, 2×660MW	
Fengtai Power Station	凤台电厂	32°45′26″N 116°39′00″E	2,520	2×600MW, 2×660MW	
Tianji Power Station	田集电厂	32°44′47″N 116°48′43″E	2,520	2×600MW, 2×660MW	
Fuyang Power Station	阜阳电厂	33°00′16″N 115°50′43″E	2,520	2×600MW, 2×660MW	
Wuhu Huadian Power Station	华电芜湖电厂	31°14′22″N 118°09′06″E	2,320	2×660MW, 1×1,000MW	
Huaibei Guo'an Power Station	淮北国安电厂	33°52′05″N 116°51′34″E	1,960	2×320MW, 2×660MW	
Suzhou Qianyinzi Power Station	宿州钱营孜电厂	33°30′38″N 116°55′36″E	1,700	2×350MW	1×1,000MW
Maanshan Power Station	马鞍山电厂	31°43′12″N 118°27′37″E	1,320	2×660MW	
Dangtu Power Station	当涂电厂	31°32′06″N 118°24′49″E	1,320	2×660MW	
Wuhu Zhongdian Power Station	中电芜湖电厂	31°27′07″N 118°20′42″E	1,320	2×660MW	
Huaibei Hushan Power Station	淮北虎山电厂	33°50′41″N 116°56′11″E	1,320	2×660MW	
Lujiang Power Station	庐江电厂	31°08′59″N 117°27′10″E	1,320	2×660MW	
Xieqiao Power Station	谢桥电厂	32°46′55″N 116°23′17″E	1,320		2×660MW
Xuancheng Power Station	宣城电厂	30°52′09″N 118°51′57″E	1,260	1×600MW 1×660MW	
Maanshan No2 Power Station	马鞍山第二电厂	31°45′03″N 118°28′47″E	1,200	4×300MW	
Tongling Guodian Power Station	国电铜陵电厂	31°04′02″N 117°57′51″E	1,200	2×600MW	
Chaohu Power Station	巢湖电厂	31°39′05″N 117°49′21″E	1,200	2×600MW	
Hefei Power Station	合肥电厂	31°54′55″N 117°15′05″E	1,200	2×600MW	
Suzhou Power Station	宿州电厂	33°48′16″N 116°58′57″E	1,200	2×600MW	
Suzhou Thermal Power Station	宿州热电厂	33°39′14″N 116°58′45″E	700	2×350MW	
Hefei No2 Power Station	合肥第二电厂	31°48′16″N 117°30′26″E	700	2×350MW	
Guqiao Power Station	顾桥电厂	32°48′51″N 116°34′05″E	660	2×330MW	
Chizhou Power Station	池州电厂	30°45′15″N 117°35′21″E	600	2×300MW	
Tianjiaan Power Station	田家庵电厂	32°40′09″N 117°01′31″E	600	2×300MW	
Masteel Power Station	马钢热电厂	31°44′04″N 118°29′21″E	525	4×60MW, 1×135MW, 1×150MW	

=== Natural gas based ===
Station	Name in Chinese	Coordinates	Capacity (MW)	Operational units	Under construction units	Reference
Chuzhou Natural Gas Power Station	滁州天然气调峰电厂	32°41′30″N 118°53′55″E	900	2×450 MW		
Hefei Natural Gas Power Station	合肥天然气调峰电厂	32°06′52″N 117°11′56″E	900	2×450 MW		
Wuhu Natural Gas Power Station	芜湖天然气调峰电厂		900		2×450 MW	

== Renewable ==
=== Hydroelectric ===
==== Pumped-storage ====
Station	Name in Chinese	Coordinates	Total capacity (MW)	Status	Height difference (meters)	Operational units	Under construction units
Jixi Pumped Storage Power Station	绩溪抽水蓄能电站	30°09′35″N 118°45′39″E	1,800	Operational	600	6×300MW	
Jinzhai Pumped-storage Hydro Power Station	金寨抽水蓄能电站	31°25′00″N 115°58′00″E	1,200	Operational	322	4×300MW	
Xiangshuijian Pumped Storage Power Station	响水涧抽水蓄能电站	31°06′46″N 118°17′31″E	1,000	Operational	190	4×250MW	
Tongcheng Pumped-storage Hydro Power Station	桐城抽水蓄能电站		1,280	Under construction	355		4×320MW
Langyashan Pumped Storage Power Station	琅琊山抽水蓄能电站	32°18′32″N 118°16′10″E	600	Operational	126	4×150MW	

=== Wind ===
Station	Name in Chinese	Coordinates	Operational capacity (MW)	Status	Units	Reference
Fengyang Wind Farm	凤阳风电场	32°42′57″N 117°20′51″E	49.8	Operational		
Laian Wind Farm	来安风电场	32°39′32″N 118°30′38″E		Operational		

=== Solar ===
By the end of September 2024, there were 40.3 GW photovoltaic power capacity connected in grid in Anhui province, of which centralized photovoltaic was 14.1 GW, and distributed photovoltaic was 26.2 GW.

Prefecture-level districts	Name in Chinese	Coordinates of major operational PV stations
Suzhou	宿州	34°19′40″N 116°22′54″E, 34°13′36″N 116°59′52″E, 33°54′53″N 117°39′27″E, 33°59′58″N 117°8′25″E, 33°49′18″N 117°31′31″E, 33°49′04″N 116°57′5″E, 33°25′12″N 116°59′0″E, 33°27′16″N 117°0′0″E, 33°34′18″N 117°8′3″E, 33°35′21″N 117°1′11″E, 33°34′47″N 116°59′19″E, 33°41′26″N 117°3′51″E, 33°59′14″N 117°25′2″E, 33°41′26″N 117°3′51″E, 33°30′41″N 117°25′22″E
Huaibei	淮北	33°53′38″N 116°39′46″E, 33°37′19″N 116°36′45″E, 33°29′11″N 116°45′27″E, 33°27′41″N 116°45′26″E, 33°32′13″N 116°53′34″E, 33°58′12″N 117°23′26″E
Bozhou	亳州	33°17′47″N 116°32′51″E, 33°25′47″N 115°59′19″E
Fuyang	阜阳	32°41′13″N 116°48′38″E, 33°11′25″N 115°26′12″E, 32°57′50″N 115°55′25″E, 32°48′2″N 116°14′28″E, 32°48′41″N 116°14′31″E, 32°49′10″N 116°17′43″E, 32°34′39″N 116°35′15″E
Bengbu	蚌埠	33°24′7″N 117°13′57″E, 33°2′20″N 117°27′49″E, 32°45′32″N 117°15′29″E, 33°2′42″N 118°2′38″E,
Huainan	淮南	32°36′42″N 116°52′42″E, 32°35′14″N 116°53′07″E, 32°36′40″N 116°34′34″E, 32°52′57″N 116°24′44″E, 32°51′53″N 116°36′49″E, 32°42′27″N 116°31′53″E, 32°44′2″N 116°34′53″E, 32°36′26″N 116°34′26″E, 32°46′43″N 116°44′26″E, 32°49′7″N 116°50′14″E, 32°48′48″N 116°52′8″E, 32°47′24″N 116°51′25″E, 32°44′40″N 116°55′14″E, 32°41′17″N 116°48′33″E, 32°37′10″N 116°52′54″E, 32°33′48″N 116°50′43″E, 32°41′32″N 117°7′44″E, 32°8′36″N 116°46′57″E, 32°8′15″N 116°53′17″E, 32°13′8″N 116°52′36″E
Lu'an	六安	31°55′16″N 115°55′43″E, 31°46′58″N 115°54′43″E, 31°46′4″N 115°57′13″E, 31°43′7″N 115°59′17″E, 31°47′10″N 115°59′39″E, 31°45′30″N 116°2′35″E, 31°43′11″N 116°3′58″E, 31°44′28″N 116°5′38″E, 31°44′57″N 116°7′31″E, 31°48′35″N 116°14′13″E, 32°3′1″N 116°10′31″E, 32°16′3″N 116°8′29″E, 32°56′3″N 116°23′52″E, 31°38′7″N 116°20′33″E, 31°31′4″N 116°44′53″E
Chuzhou	滁州	32°39′15″N 119°12′07″E

== See also ==
- List of power stations in China
