= List of major power stations in Ningxia =

This article lists the major power stations located in Ningxia province.

== Non-renewable ==
=== Coal-based ===
Station	Name in Chinese	Coordinates	Capacity (MW)	Operational units and (type)	Under construction units	Reference
Daba Power Station	大坝电厂	37°59′02″N 105°55′41″E	3,720	4×300MW, 2×600MW	2×660MW	
Yuanyanghu Power Station	鸳鸯湖电厂	38°03′27″N 106°41′29″E	3,520	2×660MW, 2×1100MW		
Zhongwei Power Station	中卫电厂	37°37′18″N 105°14′06″E	3,340	4×660 MW, 2×350MW		
Lingwu Power Station	灵武电厂	38°08′54″N 106°20′45″E	3,320	2×600MW, 2×1,060MW		
Fangjiazhuang Power Station	方家庄电厂	37°50′13″N 106°40′06″E	2,200	2×1,100MW		
Liupanshan Power Station	六盘山电厂	36°10′39″N 106°9′22″E	2,000		2×1,000MW	
Shizuishan Power Station	石嘴山电厂	39°17′03″N 106°47′21″E	1,980	6×330MW		
Ningdong Power Station	宁东电厂	37°50′42″N 106°47′13″E	1,980	2×330MW, 2×660MW		
Shuidonggou Power Station	水洞沟电厂	38°12′52″N 106°32′40″E	1,320	2×660MW		
Yinxing Power Station	银星电厂	37°43′33″N 106°44′15″E	1,320	2×660MW		
Zaoquan Power Station	枣泉电厂	38°02′30″N 106°36′04″E	1,320	2×660MW		
Pingluo Power Station	平罗电厂	39°0′44″N 106°56′10″E	1,320	2×660MW		
Yongli Power Station	永利电厂		1,320		2×660MW	
Pengyang Power Station	彭阳煤电联营项目		1,320		2×660MW	
Xixia Power Station	西夏热电厂	38°26′35″N 106°07′24″E	1,100	2×200MW	2×350MW	
Wuzhong Power Station	吴忠热电厂	37°56′11″N 106°08′23″E	700	2×350MW		
Dawukou Power Station	大武口电厂	39°02′09″N 106°23′16″E	660	2×330MW		
Zhongning Power Station	中宁电厂	37°35′22″N 105°42′23″E	660	2×330MW		
Maliantai Power Station	马莲台电厂	38°10′24″N 106°34′14″E	660	2×330MW		
Qingtongxia Aluminum Group Power Station	青铜峡铝业自备电厂	37°55′26″N 105°54′44″E	660	2×330MW		
Liupanshan Power Station	六盘山热电厂	36°02′40″N 106°17′31″E	660	2×330MW		
Yinglite Chem Power Station	英力特化工有限公司热电厂	39°18′26″N 106°43′48″E	600	2×300MW		
Ningdong Gangue Power Station	宁东矸石电厂	38°10′56″N 106°30′48″E	600	2×300MW		
Lingzhou Power Station	灵州电厂	38°08′27″N 106°34′02″E	270	2×135MW		

== Renewable ==
=== Hydroelectric ===
==== Conventional ====
Station	Name in Chinese	Coordinates	River	Total capacity (MW)	Dam height (meters)	Status	Operational units	Under construction units
Qingtongxia Hydro Power Station	青铜峡水电站	37°53′40″N 105°59′39″E	Yellow River	272	42.7	Operational	7×36MW, 1×20MW	
Shapotou Hydro Power Station	沙坡头水电站	37°26′46″N 105°01′13″E	Yellow River	153.2	37.6	Operational	5×290MW, 1×5.2MW, 1×3MW	

==== Pumped-storage ====
Station	Name in Chinese	Coordinates	Capacity (MW)	Rated head (meters)	Status	Operational units	Under construction Units
Niushoushan Pumped Storage Power Station	牛首山抽水蓄能电站		1,000	382	Under construction		4×250 MW

== See also ==
- List of power stations in China
