= List of major power stations in Tianjin =

This article lists the major power stations located in Tianjin.

== Non-renewable ==
=== Coal-based ===
Station	Name in Chinese	Coordinates	Capacity (MW)	Operational units	Under construction units	Reference
Beijiang Power Station	北疆电厂	39°13′08″N 117°55′50″E	4,000	4×1000MW		
Panshan Power Station	盘山电厂	39°58′47″N 117°27′41″E	2,200	2×500MW, 2×600MW		
Junliangcheng Power Station	军粮城电厂	39°03′13″N 117°24′41″E	1,850	4×200MW, 3×350MW		
Dagang Power Station	大港电厂	38°46′30″N 117°29′38″E	1,314	4×328.5MW		
Yangliuqing Power Station	杨柳青电厂	39°09′05″N 117°02′15″E	1,300	2×350MW, 2×300MW		

=== Gas-based ===
Station	Name in Chinese	Coordinates	Capacity (MW)	Operational units	Underconstructed units	Reference
Chentangzhuang Gas Power Station	陈塘庄热电厂煤改气	38°57′43″N 117°11′08″E	1,800	2×900MW		
Junliangcheng Gas Power Station	军粮城电厂	39°03′20″N 117°24′29″E	650	650MW		
Lingang Gas Thermal Power Station	天津临港燃机热电	38°55′25″N 117°43′42″E	477	1×477MW		
Huadian Fuyuan Thermal Power Station	天津华电福源热电	39°26′05″N 116°59′03″E	400	2×200MW		

== Renewable ==
=== Wind ===
Station	Name in Chinese	Coordinates	Operational capacity (MW)	Status	Units	Reference
Dashengtang Wind Power Farm	大神堂风电场		26	Operational	13×2MW	

== See also ==
- List of power stations in China
