= Huizhou Pumped Storage Power Station =

Huizhou Pumped-storage Power Station
- Interactive map of Huizhou Pumped-storage Power Station
- Country: China
- Location: Huizhou, Guangdong
- Coordinates: 23°16′07″N 114°18′50″E
- Status: Operational
- Opening date: 2007-2011

Power Station
- Pump-generators: 8
- Installed capacity: 2,448 megawatts (3,283,000 hp)
- Annual generation: 4,200 gigawatt-hours (15,000 TJ)

The Huizhou Pumped Storage Power Station (Chinese: 惠州抽水蓄能电站) is a pumped storage hydroelectric power station near Huizhou in Guangdong province, China. It contains 8 pump-generators that total a 2,448-megawatt (3,283,000 hp) installed capacity. Initial units went online between 2007 and 2008, and the power station was complete on June 15, 2011.

The power station is supplied with water by an upper reservoir which is created by two dams. The main dam is a 56 metres (184 ft) tall and 156 metres (512 ft) long roller-compacted concrete (RCC) dam. The second, auxiliary, dam is 14 metres (46 ft) high and 133 metres (436 ft) long. Once water from the upper reservoir is transferred through the power station, which is located 420 metres (1,380 ft) underground, and electricity produced, it discharges to a lower reservoir. This lower reservoir is created by a single 61 m (200 ft) tall 420 m (1,380 ft) long RCC dam. The water can then be pumped by the generators back into the upper reservoir for reuse.

== See also ==
- Guangdong Pumped Storage Power Station
- List of power stations in China
