= Jixi Pumped Storage Power Station =

- Official name: 绩溪抽水蓄能电站
- Country: China
- Location: Jixi County
- Coordinates: 30.1593°N 118.7617°E
- Status: Operational
- Construction began: 2010
- Opening date: 2019-2021
- Construction cost: CNY¥8.2 billion (US$ 1.2 billion)

Upper reservoir
- Total capacity: 10,598,000 m^{3} (8,592 acre⋅ft)

Lower reservoir
- Total capacity: 10,944,000 m^{3} (8,872 acre⋅ft)

Power Station
- Turbines: 6 x 300 MW Francis pump turbines
- Installed capacity: 1,800 MW

The Jixi Pumped Storage Power Station (Chinese: 绩溪抽水蓄能电站) is a pumped-storage hydroelectric power station currently under construction in Jixi County, Anhui Province, China. Studies were carried out in 2008 and construction began in December 2010. It is expected to last 6 years. As of April 2017 the dam is completed. First turbine was commissioned in December 2019, followed by second in May 2020 and third and fourth in August 2020. The last two units were commissioned in February 2021.

== Reservoirs ==
The lower reservoir is formed by a 63.9 m (210 ft) tall and 480 m (1,575 ft) long concrete-face rock-fill dam (CFRD), with a storage capacity of 10,944,000 m^{3} (8,872 acre⋅ft) of which 8,670,000 m^{3} (7,029 acre⋅ft) is active (or 'usable') for pumping. The upper reservoir is formed by a CFRD as well, which is 114.2 m (375 ft) tall and 330 m (1,083 ft) long, withholding a 10,598,000 m^{3} (8,592 acre⋅ft) man-made lake. The normal elevation of the lower reservoir is 339.3 m (1,113 ft) and the upper 961 m (3,153 ft). This difference in elevation affords a rated hydraulic head of 599 m (1,965 ft). The power station is located underground near the bank of the lower reservoir and contains six 300 MW Francis pump turbine-generators.

== See also ==
- List of major power stations in Anhui
- List of pumped-storage hydroelectric power stations
