= Shuikou shiplift =

The ShuiKou shiplift was built in Fujian province, on the Min River. It can lift vessels displacing 500 tons. Its caisson's dimensions are 124 metres (407 ft) × 12 metres (39 ft) × 2.5 metres (8.2 ft). The ShuiKou Dam's maximum height is 101 metres (331 ft).

Beside the shiplift there is flight of three conventional locks, also capable of transitting vessels of 500 tons. When built it was the second largest shiplift in China, after the one being built on the Three Gorges Dam.

World Bank planning documents describe both the shiplift and flight of conventional locks as being capable of transiting two 500 ton vessels. The World Bank planning documents anticipated 700,000 tons per year would transit the dam. The maximum capacity of the shiplift and flight of locks is 3.2 million tons per year.

Construction of the shiplift began in 1991. A catastrophic flood on the river, in 1992, delayed completion.
