= Fengtan Dam =

- Location within China
- Country: China
- Location: Zhangjiajie
- Coordinates: 28°43′11″N 110°16′27″E
- Status: Operational
- Construction began: 1970
- Opening date: 1978

Dam and spillways
- Type of dam: Arch-gravity
- Impounds: You River
- Height: 112.5 m (369 ft)
- Length: 488 m (1,601 ft)
- Elevation at crest: 211.5 m (694 ft)
- Width (base): 65.5 m (215 ft)

Reservoir
- Total capacity: 1,740,000,000 m^{3} (1,410,641 acre⋅ft)
- Catchment area: 17,400 km^{2} (6,718 sq mi)
- Normal elevation: 205 m (673 ft)

Power Station
- Commission date: 1978/79; 2004
- Turbines: 4 x 100 MW; 2 x 200 MW; Francis-type
- Installed capacity: 800 MW
- Annual generation: 2,043 GWh

The Fengtan Dam is an arch-gravity dam on the You River, located 48 km (30 mi) southeast of Zhangjiajie in Hunan Province, China. The purpose of the multi-purpose dam is flood control, irrigation, power generation and navigation. The dam has a power station with an installed capacity of 800 MW and provides water for the irrigation of 44 km^{2} (17 sq mi). Construction on the dam began in 1970 and the first generator was operational in 1978. All four of the original generators were operational by 1979. A power plant expansion project began in 2001 and in 2004 two additional 200 MW generators were commissioned.

== Design ==
The Fengtan is a 112.5 m (369 ft) tall and 488 m (1,601 ft) long (at the crest) arch-gravity dam. Its base arch length is 200 m (656 ft) and the dam has a curve radius of 243 m (797 ft). The base width of the dam is 65.5 m (215 ft). The crest sits at an elevation of 211.5 m (694 ft) above sea level while normal reservoir elevation is 205 m (673 ft). The dam sits at the head of a 17,400 km^{2} (6,718 sq mi) catchment area and withholds a reservoir with a capacity of 1,740,000,000 m^{3} (1,410,641 acre⋅ft). The dam's spillway is located on its downstream face and consists of 13 chutes controlled by radial gates. Six of the chutes have their flip buckets mid-way on the face of the dam while the seven others are on the lower portion. The original power house is located within the left side of the dam near the abutment and contains four 100 MW Francis turbine-generators. The turbines are afforded a rated hydraulic head of 78 m (256 ft) and are each supplied water via a 5.6 m (18 ft) diameter penstock. On the dam's right bank, there is a 50-ton boat lift which is also used to move lumber as well.

== See also ==
- List of dams and reservoirs in China
- List of major power stations in Hunan
