= He Jing (engineer) =

Chinese hydraulic engineer and politician (1934–2019)

He Jing (Chinese: 何璟; December 1934 – 22 November 2019) was a Chinese hydraulic engineer and politician. She served as chief engineer and vice minister of the Ministry of Water Resources of the People's Republic of China, and was the chief designer of the Ankang Dam and the Shiquan Dam.

== Biography ==
He Jing was born in December 1934 in Fuzhou, Fujian, Republic of China. She graduated from East China Institute of Hydrology (now Hohai University) in 1956, and joined the Chinese Communist Party the same year.

In 1956, she became an engineer at the Beijing Survey and Design Institute of the Ministry of Electric Power, and participated in the design of the Liujiaxia Dam. After 1976, she served as chief designer of the Ankang Dam in Shaanxi. She also designed the Shiquan Dam (石泉电站), which won the State Science and Technology Progress Award (Second Class).

She was appointed chief engineer of the Ministry of Water Resources of the People's Republic of China in 1988, and vice minister in 1993. From 1997, she served as an advisor to the State Power Corporation of China. She became an advisor to China Datang Corporation in 2003.

== Personal life ==
He Jing married Lu Youmei, her classmate at East China Institute of Hydrology. Lu, also a hydraulic engineer, is an academician of the Chinese Academy of Engineering.

She died on 22 November 2019 in Beijing, aged 84.
