= Jiangya Dam =

- Location within China
- Country: China
- Location: Zhangjiajie
- Coordinates: 29°32′26″N 110°44′22″E
- Status: Operational
- Construction began: 1995
- Opening date: 1999
- Construction cost: US$400 million

Dam and spillways
- Type of dam: Concrete gravity
- Impounds: Loushui River
- Height: 131 m (430 ft)
- Length: 368 m (1,207 ft)
- Elevation at crest: 245 m (804 ft)
- Width (base): 107 m (351 ft)
- Dam volume: 1,370,000 m^{3} (1,791,892 cu yd)

Reservoir
- Total capacity: 1,740,000,000 m^{3} (1,410,641 acre⋅ft)
- Catchment area: 3,711 km^{2} (1,433 sq mi)
- Normal elevation: 236 m (774 ft)

Power Station
- Commission date: 1998
- Hydraulic head: 80 m (262 ft) (design)
- Turbines: 3 x 100 MW Francis-type
- Installed capacity: 300 MW
- Annual generation: 756 GWh

The Jiangya Dam is a concrete gravity dam on the Loushui River, located 50 km (31 mi) northeast of Zhangjiajie in Hunan Province, China. The primary purpose of the multi-purpose dam is flood control but it also generates hydroelectricity, supplies water for irrigation and municipal use and improves navigation.

== Background ==
The dam's power plant has a 300 MW capacity and generates on average 756 GWh annually. It provides for the irrigation of 5,570 ha (13,764 acres) and water storage for about 50,000 people. The dam also reserves 740,000,000 m^{3} (599,928 acre⋅ft) for flood storage and supports a 20-ton ship lift. Construction on the dam began in 1995, the first generator was operational in 1998 and the project complete in 1999. The dam was constructed with roller-compacted concrete (RCC) and is noteworthy because it was the first dam to use the slope/inclined laying process as opposed to horizontal. This technique was used from the dam's midsection upward and reduced both the cost and time of construction. The dam was constructed at a cost of about US$400 million, of which $97 million was provided by the World Bank.

== Design ==
The dam is a 131 m (430 ft) tall and 368 m (1,207 ft) long concrete gravity dam with a structural volume of 1,370,000 m^{3} (1,791,892 cu yd). The base of the dam is 107 m (351 ft) wide and the crest is at an elevation of 245 m (804 ft) while the reservoir has a normal elevation of 236 m (774 ft). The dam sits at the head of a 3,711 km^{2} (1,433 sq mi) catchment area and creates a reservoir with a capacity of 1,740,000,000 m^{3} (1,410,641 acre⋅ft). The dam's spillway is controlled by four gates and at the base of the chutes, flip buckets dissipate the water's energy. Within the three center spillway piers are three intermediate outlets. These outlets and the spillway can discharge up to 11,700 m^{3}/s (413,182 cu ft/s). The dam's power house is located underground on the dam's right bank and contains three 100 MW Francis turbine-generators. The dam's 20-ton ship lift is located on the left bank and is 935 m (3,068 ft) long. The irrigation intake is located on the left bank of the reservoir.

== VLF-transmitter ==
Over the eastern part of Jiangya reservoir at 29°35'21"N 110°44'23"E multiple wires of a VLF-transmitter used for transmitting orders to submarines are spun. The facility is similar to Jim Creek Naval Radio Station, but much larger,

== See also ==
- List of dams and reservoirs in China
- List of major power stations in Hunan
