= Ankang Dam =

- Location within China
- Country: People's Republic of China
- Location: Ankang, Shaanxi
- Coordinates: 32°36′15″N 108°53′33″E
- Status: In use
- Construction began: 1978
- Opening date: Dec. 23, 1989

Dam and spillways
- Type of dam: Gravity
- Impounds: Hanjiang (Han) River
- Height: 128 m (420 ft)
- Length: 541.5 m (1,777 ft)
- Spillways: 5
- Spillway type: Service, controlled crest surface chutes

Reservoir
- Creates: Ankang Reservoir
- Total capacity: 2,580,000,000 m^{3} (2,091,640 acre⋅ft)
- Catchment area: 35,700 km^{2} (13,784 sq mi)

Power Station
- Hydraulic head: 76.2 m (250 ft) (design)
- Turbines: 4 x 200 MW
- Installed capacity: 800 MW
- Annual generation: 2800 GWh

The Ankang Dam is gravity dam on the Hanjiang (Han) River near Ankang in Shaanxi Province, China. The main purpose of the dam is hydroelectric power production along with other purposes such as flood control and navigation. The dam withholds a 2,580,000,000 m^{3} (2,091,640 acre⋅ft) reservoir which supplies water to its powerhouse located on the right toe. The power station contains 4 x 200 MW generators for a total installed capacity of 800 MW. On the dam's surface adjacent to the power house are five controlled spillway chutes. The dam also houses five mid-level openings and four base openings for discharging water as well.

He Jing was the chief designer of the dam. Construction began in 1978 and the dam structure was complete on December 23, 1989. Almost a year later on December 12, 1990, the first generator became operational. It was not until December 25, 1992, that all four generators were operational and by 1995, the entire project was complete.

== See also ==
- List of power stations in China
