= Laxiwa Dam =

- Location within China
- Official name: 拉西瓦大坝
- Location: Guide County, Qinghai, China
- Coordinates: 36°04′18″N 101°11′14″E
- Opening date: 2009
- Operators: Upper Yellow River Hydropower Development Company, Ltd

Dam and spillways
- Type of dam: Arch dam
- Impounds: Yellow River
- Height: 250 m (820 ft)
- Length: 460 m (1,510 ft)
- Dam volume: 3,681,800 m^{3} (130,020,000 ft^{3})

Reservoir
- Creates: Laxiwa Reservoir
- Total capacity: 1,079,000,000 m^{3} (875,000 acre⋅ft)

Power Station
- Commission date: May 18, 2009 (first two units)
- Turbines: 6 × 700MW
- Installed capacity: 4,200 MW
- Annual generation: 10.223 TWh (mean)

The Laxiwa Dam (simplified Chinese: 拉西瓦大坝; traditional Chinese: 拉西瓦大壩; pinyin: Lāxīwǎ Dàbà) is an arch dam on the Yellow River in Qinghai Province, northwest China. It is 32 km (20 mi) downstream of the Longyangxia Dam and 73 km (45 mi) upstream from the Lijiaxia Dam. The main purpose of the dam is hydroelectric power generation and it supports the largest station in the Yellow River basin. The facility generates power by utilizing six turbines, each with a generating capacity of 700 MW, totaling to a capacity of 4,200 MW.

== Construction ==
By the beginning of 2004, the Yellow River was diverted and in September of that year, excavation on the dam's abutment began. In April 2006, the first concrete was cast and on May 18, 2009, the power plant's first two generators were commissioned. A total of 79,571,000 m^{3} (2.8100×10^{9} ft^{3}) of earth and rock were excavated from the dam site.

== See also ==
- List of power stations in China
- List of tallest dams in the world
- List of tallest dams in China
- List of dams and reservoirs in China
