= Shuikou Dam =

- Location within China
- Country: China
- Location: Fujian Province
- Coordinates: 26°18′11″N 118°48′43″E
- Status: Operational
- Opening date: 1996

Dam and spillways
- Type of dam: Concrete gravity
- Impounds: Minjiang River
- Height: 101 metres (331 ft)
- Length: 783 metres (2,569 ft)
- Spillway type: Service, controlled overflow flip-bucket

Reservoir
- Creates: Shuikou Reservoir
- Total capacity: 2,600,000,000 cubic metres (2,107,854 acre⋅ft)
- Catchment area: 52,438 square kilometres (20,246 sq mi)

Power Station
- Commission date: 1996
- Turbines: 7 x 200 MW Kaplan turbines
- Installed capacity: 1,400 MW
- Annual generation: 4950 GWh

The Shuikou Dam is a concrete gravity dam on the Minjiang River in Fujian Province, China. The primary purpose of the dam is hydroelectric power generation and it supports a 1,400 MW power station with 7 x 200 MW Kaplan turbines. The dam also provides navigation with a 500-ton flight of 3 ship locks and a 500-ton ship lift. Other purposes include flood control, irrigation and recreation.

== See also ==
- List of power stations in China
