= Datang International Power Generation Company =

Chinese energy company

Datang International Power Generation Company 大唐国际发電股份
- Company type: State-owned enterprise
- Industry: Power Generation
- Founded: 1994
- Headquarters: Beijing, People's Republic of China
- Area served: People's Republic of China
- Key people: Chairman: Mr. Di Ruoyu
- Website: Datang International Power Generation Company

Parent company: China Datang Corporation

Datang International Power Generation Company Limited (SEHK: 991,SSE: 601991), simply Datang International Power or Datang Power, is one of the five largest state-owned power producers in China, especially its position in Northern China. It is engaged in the development and operation of power plants, the sale of electricity and thermal power, and the repair and maintenance of power equipment and power-related technical services.

Datang Power owns four operating power plants and managed 17 power companies, with total installed capacity amounted to 15,410 megawatts (MW) at the end of mid-2006.

Datang Power was incorporated on 13 December 1994. The state-owned enterprise has been listed on the Hong Kong Stock Exchange and London Stock Exchange since 21 March 1997.

Datang Power is involved in the development of renewable energy projects.

== See also ==
- State Electricity Regulatory Commission (SERC)
