= Golmud Gas-fire Power Station =

Golmud Gas-fire Power Station 格尔木燃气电站
- Country: China
- Location: Golmud, Qinghai
- Purpose: Power
- Opening date: December 26, 2004
- Construction cost: ¥ 1.2 billion

The Golmud Gas-fire Power Station (Chinese: 格尔木燃气电站), also known as Ge-ermu Gas Power Station, is a gas-steam combined circulation power plant in Qinghai, with a total installed capacity of 300MW.

Golmud Gas-fire Power Station is a major power supply project in the "Tenth Five-Year Plan" and the "Eleventh Five-Year Plan" of Qinghai Province. It is the highest gas-fired power station in the world, with a total investment of ¥ 1.2 billion.

== History ==
In 2003, the project was formally approved by the National Development and Reform Commission and the groundbreaking ceremony was held on December 26, 2004. In October 2006, the access system of the generating plant was overhauled.

In 2007, the first unit of the Golmud Gas-fire Power Station was officially connected to the grid for power generation.
