= Guodian Beilun Power Station =

Coal-fired power station in Ningbo, China

Guodian Beilun Power Station 国电北仑发电厂
- Official name: 国 电 北仑 发电厂
- Country: China
- Location: Zhejiang
- Coordinates: 29°56′37″N 121°48′57″E
- Status: Operational
- Construction began: January 1988 (1,200 MW Phase 1); June 1996 (1,800 MW Phase 2); December 2006 (2,000 MW Phase 3)
- Commission date: November 1994 (1,200 MW Phase 1); September 2000 (1,800 MW Phase 2); June 2009 (2,000 MW Phase 3)
- Owner: China Energy Investment

Thermal power station
- Primary fuel: Coal

Power generation
- Units operational: 5 × 600 MW; 2 × 1,000 MW
- Nameplate capacity: 5,000 MW
- Annual net output: 27.5 TW·h

The Guodian Beilun Power Station (Chinese: 国电北仑发电厂; pinyin: Guódiàn Běilún Fādiànchǎng) is a coal-fired power station in Beilun District, Ningbo, Zhejiang, China. With an installed capacity of 5,000 MW, it is the 7th largest coal-fired power station in the world. (It shares this title with the Jiaxing, Guohua Taishan, and Waigaoqiao power stations). The station generates energy by five 600 MW and two 1,000 MW units, which is fuelled by coal.

Guodian Beilun Power Station is also the first power generation enterprise in China to use World Bank loans for construction.

== See also ==
- List of coal power stations
- List of largest power stations in the world
- List of power stations in China
