= Shisanling Pumped Storage Power Station =

- Interactive map of Shisanling Pumped Storage Power Station
- Country: China
- Location: Changping District, Beijing
- Coordinates: 40°15′20″N 116°16′07″E
- Status: Operational
- Construction began: 1988
- Opening date: 1995

Upper reservoir
- Creates: Shisanling Upper
- Total capacity: 4,000,000 cubic metres (141,258,667 ft^{3}) (Normal)

Lower reservoir
- Creates: Shisanling Lower
- Total capacity: 51,000,000 cubic metres (41,346 acre⋅ft) (Normal)

Power Station
- Hydraulic head: 430 metres (1,411 ft)
- Pump-generators: 4 x 200 MW
- Installed capacity: 800 MW
- Annual generation: 1246 GWh

The Shisanling Pumped Storage Power Station (十三陵抽水蓄能电厂) is a pumped-storage power station in Changping District of Beijing, China, near the Thirteen Tombs of the Ming Dynasty from where it got its name Shisanling, which means "thirteen tombs". The power station contains four reversible turbines for an installed capacity of 800 MW.

== Background ==
Planning and designs for the power station commenced in 1974 and in 1988, the National Electric Power Ministry and People's Government of Beijing decided to go forth with the project. Construction was initiated that year and by 1995, the first unit was in operation.

== Operation ==
=== Shisanling Dam ===
The Shisanling Dam creates the power station's lower reservoir and was an already existing dam. The earth-fill embankment dam is 29 metres (95 ft) high and 627 metres (2,057 ft) long. The dam creates a reservoir that can store 59,000,000 cubic metres (2.083565337×10^{9} ft^{3}) of water and contains a controlled chute spillway.

=== Upper reservoir ===
From the lower reservoir, water is pumped up into the upper reservoir which has a normal storage capacity of 51,000,000 cubic metres (41,346 acre⋅ft). The upper reservoir is artificial was built into the Mang mountain with the assistance of a 75 metres (246 ft) high and 550 metres (1,804 ft) long concrete-face rock-fill dam. When power is being generated, the water leaves the reservoir and falls through two penstocks down towards the power station which is underground and just above the lower reservoir. Before reaching the reversible turbines, the water branches off into four branch pipes.

=== Power station ===
The four branch pipes feed water into the four turbines and after it generates power it is returned to the lower reservoir to repeat cycle when operating. Each reversible turbine has a 200 MW installed capacity. The turbines and generators are stored in an underground power house measuring 145 metres (476 ft) long, 23 metres (75 ft) wide and 46.6 metres (153 ft) high.

== See also ==
- List of power stations in China
