= Waigaoqiao Power Station =

Coal-fired power station in Shanghai, China

Waigaoqiao Power Station 外高桥发电厂
- Country: China
- Location: Shanghai
- Coordinates: 31°21′21″N 121°35′54″E
- Status: Operational
- Commission date: 1995
- Owner: China Power Investment
- Operator: Shenergy Group

Thermal power station
- Primary fuel: Coal

Power generation
- Units operational: 4 X 300 MW (subcritical); 2 X 900 MW (ultra supercritical); 2 X 1,000 MW (ultra supercritical)
- Nameplate capacity: 5,000 MW
- Annual net output: 11.4 TWh

The Waigaoqiao Power Station (Chinese: 外高桥发电厂; pinyin: Wàigāoqiáo Fādiànchǎng) is a coal-fired power station in Pudong, Shanghai, China. With an installed capacity of 5,000 MW, it is the 7th largest coal-fired power station in the world. (It shares this title with the Guodian Beilun, Guohua Taishan, and Jiaxing power stations.) The power stations produces up to 11.4 TWh of energy annually. It is owned by China Power Investment, a local power company.

== Transportation ==
The power station is accessible within walking distance north east of North Waigaoqiao Free Trade Zone Station of Shanghai Metro.

== See also ==
- List of coal power stations
- List of largest power stations in the world
- List of power stations in China
