= Wuqiangxi Dam =

- Location within China
- Official name: 五强溪水库
- Country: China
- Location: Yuanling County, Hunan Province
- Coordinates: 28°46′33″N 110°55′25″E
- Status: In use
- Construction began: 1986
- Opening date: 1996

Dam and spillways
- Type of dam: Gravity
- Impounds: Yuan River
- Height: 87.5 m (287 ft)
- Length: 724 m (2,375 ft)

Reservoir
- Creates: Wuqiangxi Reservoir
- Total capacity: 4,350,000,000 m^{3} (3,526,602 acre⋅ft)
- Catchment area: 83,800 km^{2} (32,355 sq mi)

Power Station
- Commission date: 1996
- Turbines: 5 x 240 MW
- Installed capacity: 1,200 MW
- Annual generation: 5.37 TWh

The Wuqiangxi Dam (Chinese: 五强溪水库; pinyin: Wǔqiángxī Shuǐkù) is a gravity dam on the Yuan River in Yuanling County, Hunan Province, China. The purpose of the dam is flood control, hydroelectric power generation and navigation. The dam supports a 1,200 MW power station (255 MW firm power) along with a three-stage ship lock. Initial construction on the dam began in September 1986 and construction on the dam's structures began in December 1989. All five generators were operational in December 1996.

== See also ==
- List of power stations in China
