= Lijiaxia Dam =

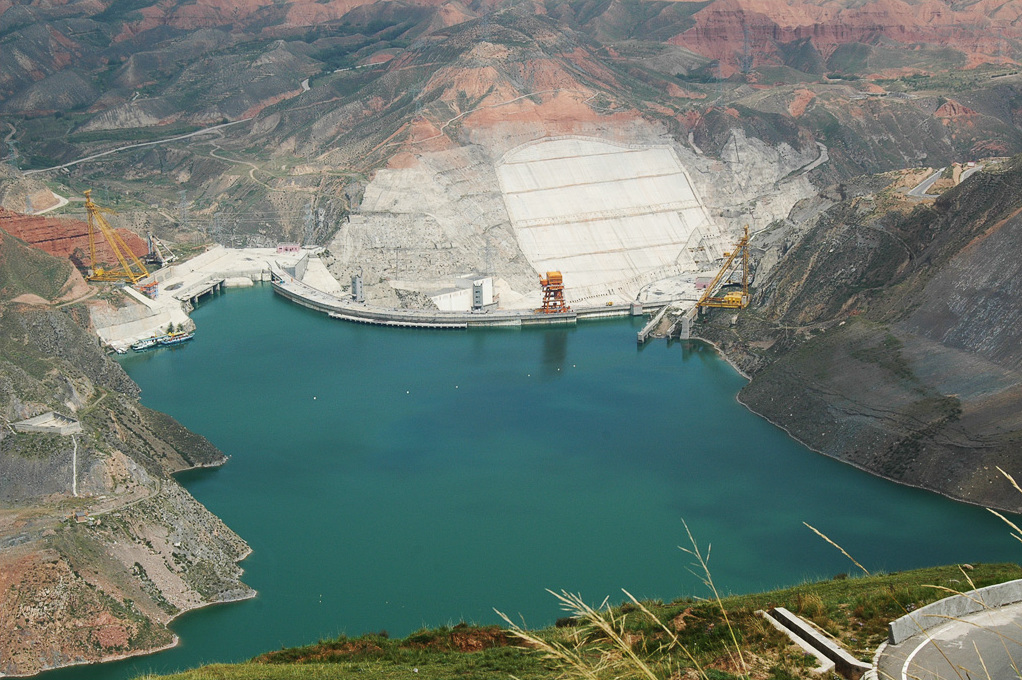
- Lijiaxia Dam

- Location within China
- Country: China
- Location: Jainca County, Qinghai Province
- Coordinates: 36°07′06″N 101°48′28″E
- Status: In use
- Construction began: 1988
- Opening date: 1997

Dam and spillways
- Type of dam: Arch gravity dam
- Impounds: Yellow River
- Height: 155 metres (509 ft)
- Length: 396 metres (1,299 ft)
- Width (crest): 8 metres (26 ft)
- Width (base): 45 metres (148 ft)
- Spillway type: Service, gate-controlled on crest

Reservoir
- Creates: Lijiaxia Reservoir
- Total capacity: 1,650,000,000 cubic metres (1,337,677 acre⋅ft)
- Catchment area: 136,747 square kilometres (52,798 sq mi)
- Surface area: 383 square kilometres (148 sq mi)

Power Station
- Hydraulic head: 100 metres (328 ft) (design)
- Turbines: 5 x 400 MW
- Installed capacity: 2,000 MW

The Lijiaxia Dam (Chinese: 李家峡水库) is a concrete arch-gravity dam on the Yellow River in Jainca County, Qinghai Province, China. The dam houses a hydroelectric power station with 5 x 400 MW generators for a total installed capacity of 2,000 MW. Construction began in April 1988 and the reservoir began to fill on December 26, 1996. On January 26, 1997, the initial reservoir operating level was reached and the first generator was commissioned in February.

== See also ==
- List of power stations in China
