= Hongping Pumped Storage Power Station =

- Country: China
- Location: Hongping, Jing'an County, Jiangxi Province
- Coordinates: 29°3′58.99″N 115°19′6.16″E
- Status: Under construction
- Construction began: 2010
- Opening date: 2014-2017 (Phase 1)
- Operator(s): Jiangxi Hongping Pumped Storage Ltd.

Upper reservoir
- Creates: Hongping Upper
- Total capacity: 27,060,000 m^{3} (21,940 acre⋅ft), 6,300,000 m^{3} (5,100 acre⋅ft) (active)

Lower reservoir
- Creates: Hongping Lower
- Total capacity: 54,140,000 m^{3} (43,890 acre⋅ft), 35,470,000 m^{3} (28,760 acre⋅ft) (active)

Power Station
- Hydraulic head: 528 m (1,732 ft)
- Pump-generators: 4 x 300 MW Francis pump turbines
- Installed capacity: 1,200 MW
- Annual generation: 1,700 GW·h (planned)

The Hongping Pumped Storage Power Station (Chinese: 洪屏抽水蓄能电站) is a 1,200 MW pumped-storage hydroelectric power station located at about 11 km (6.8 mi) northwest of Hongping in Jing'an County of Jiangxi Province, China. It was the first pumped-storage hydroelectric power station constructed in Jiangxi.

It is operated by Jiangxi Hongping Pumped Storage Ltd.

== Construction ==
The project was split into two phases, with first phase resulting in 1,200MW of installed capacity. Construction on the project's first phase began in June 2010. The first generator was commissioned in June 2014 and by December 2016, all the four 300MW generators were commissioned, marking the end of the first phase.

In 2021, a feasibility study on the second phase of the project was begun. The study completed in November 2022 and the second phase project, which plans to add an additional total capacity of 1,800 MW to the power station, was deemed feasible. When fully operational, the power station will have an installed capacity of 3,000 MW.

== Reservoirs ==
The lower reservoir is created by a 77.5 m (254 ft) tall and 181.25 m (594.7 ft) long roller-compacted concrete gravity dam on the Hebei River. It can withhold up to 54,140,000 m^{3} (43,890 acre⋅ft) of water, of which 35,470,000 m^{3} (28,760 acre⋅ft) can be pumped to the upper reservoir. The upper reservoir is created by a 44 m (144 ft) tall and 107 m (351 ft) long concrete gravity dam. It can withhold up to 27,060,000 m^{3} (21,940 acre⋅ft) of water, of which 6,300,000 m^{3} (5,100 acre⋅ft) can be used for power production. Water from the upper reservoir is sent to the underground power station down near the lower reservoir through two 1,318.2–1,296.5 m (4,325–4,254 ft) long headrace/penstock pipes. The power station contains four 300 MW Francis pump turbines. The difference in elevation between the upper and lower reservoir affords a hydraulic head (water drop) of 528 m (1,732 ft).

== See also ==
- List of pumped-storage power stations
