= Heimifeng Pumped Storage Power Station =

- Interactive map of Heimifeng Pumped Storage Power Station
- Country: China
- Location: Changsha
- Coordinates: 28°27′35″N 113°00′36″E
- Status: Operational
- Construction began: 2005
- Opening date: 2009/2010
- Owner: China Power Investment Corporation

Upper reservoir
- Total capacity: 9,965,000 m^{3} (8,079 acre⋅ft)

Lower reservoir
- Total capacity: 9,593,000 m^{3} (7,777 acre⋅ft)

Power Station
- Turbines: 4 x 300 MW (400,000 hp) Francis pump turbines
- Installed capacity: 1,200 MW (1,600,000 hp)

The Heimifeng Pumped Storage Power Station (Chinese: 黑麋峰抽水蓄能电站) is located at the hills of Heimifeng, Qiaoyi town, Wangcheng district, 25 kilometres (16 mi) north of Changsha in Hunan province, China. It was constructed between 2005 and 2009 with the generators being commissioned in 2009 and 2010. The station generates power by transferring water between an upper and lower reservoir. When energy demand is high, water from the upper reservoir is released and used to generate electricity before being discharged into the lower reservoir. During times of low demand, water from the lower reservoir is then pumped back up to replenish upper reservoir. This process allows the station to meet peak energy demand and it can go from standstill to operational in three minutes.

The upper reservoir is located at an elevation of 400 metres (1,300 ft) formed by two main dams and two auxiliary dams. The main dams are 69.5-metre (228 ft) and 59.5-metre (195 ft) high concrete-face rock-fill dams (CFRD). Helping to support the reservoir is an additional 39.5-metre (130 ft) CFRD and a 19.5-metre (64 ft) tall gravity dam. The upper reservoir has a storage capacity of 9,965,000 cubic metres (8,079 acre⋅ft). The lower reservoir sits at an elevation of 103.7 metres (340 ft) and is 1 kilometre (0.62 mi) north of the lower reservoir. It is created by a 79.5-metre (261 ft) tall rock-fill dam which withholds a reservoir of 9,593,000 cubic metres (7,777 acre⋅ft). Located in the underground power station is four 300-megawatt (400,000 hp) reversible Francis pump turbines. The difference in elevation between the two reservoirs affords a hydraulic head of 295 metres (968 ft). The station generates 1.606 billion kWh annually and consumes 2.16 billion kWh in pumping mode. The plant is profitable because pumping occurs during low demand periods when electricity is cheap.

== See also ==
- List of pumped-storage hydroelectric power stations
