= Tai'an Pumped Storage Power Station =

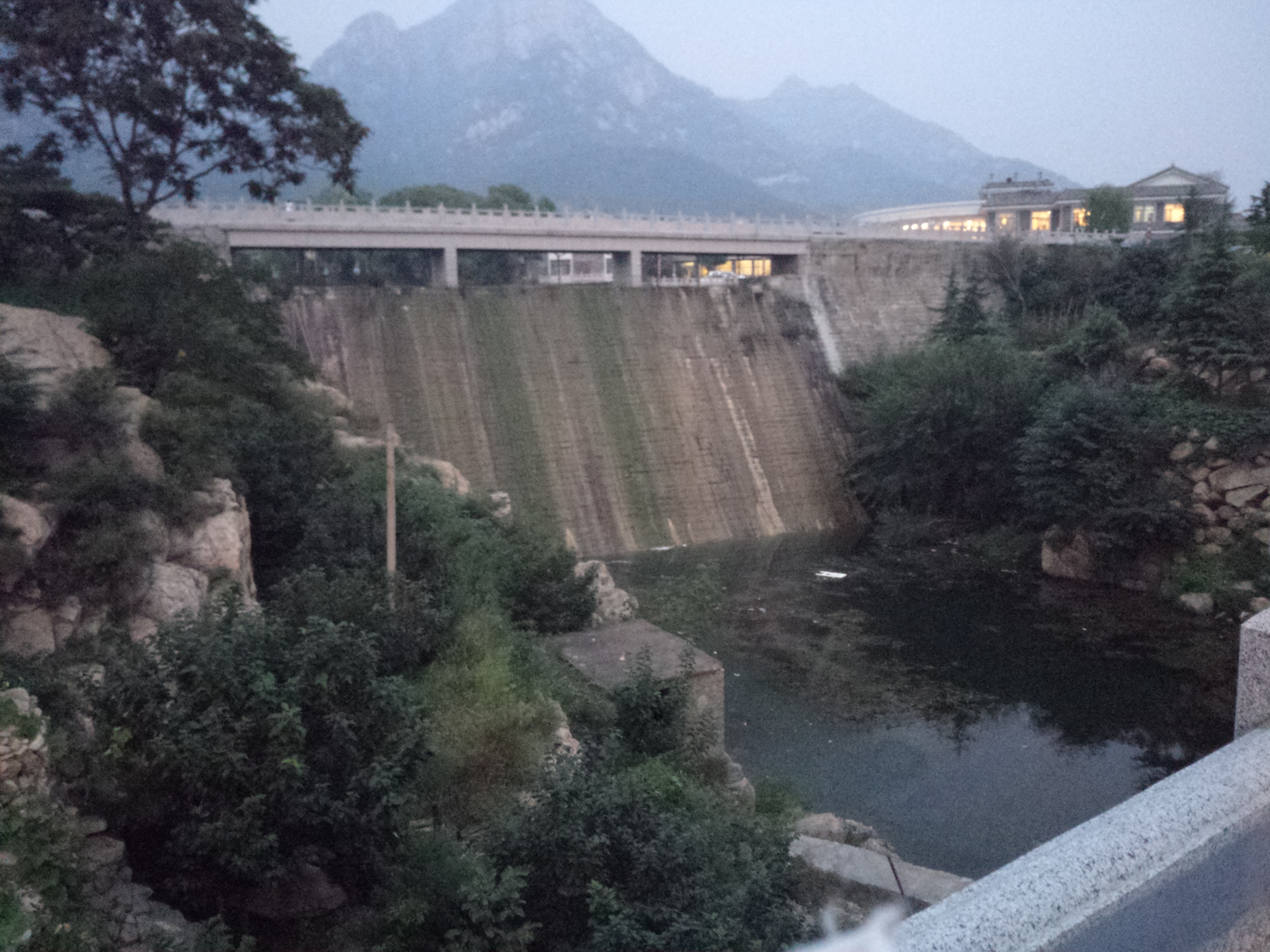
- Country: China
- Location: Tai'an, Shandong Province
- Coordinates: 36°13′31.54″N 117°2′35.48″E
- Status: Operational
- Construction began: February 2000
- Opening date: 2005-2007
- Operator(s): State Grid Xinyuan Co

Upper reservoir
- Creates: Tai'an Upper
- Total capacity: 10,430,900 m^{3} (8,456.5 acre⋅ft)

Lower reservoir
- Creates: Dahe Reservoir
- Total capacity: 29,050,000 m^{3} (23,550 acre⋅ft)

Power Station
- Hydraulic head: 248 m (814 ft)
- Pump-generators: 4 x 250 MW Francis pump turbines
- Installed capacity: 1,000 MW
- Annual generation: 1.3 billion kWh

The Tai'an Pumped Storage Power Station is a 1,000 MW pumped-storage hydroelectric power station located in the city of Tai'an in Shandong Province, China. Construction on the project began in February 2000 and the upper reservoir began to fill in May 2005. The four generators were commissioned between December 2005 and August 2007. The power station operates by shifting water between an upper and lower reservoir to generate electricity. The lower reservoir, Dahe Reservoir, was originally built in 1960 but repaired extensively for the project. The Tai'an Upper Reservoir is located in a valley above the east side of the lower reservoir. During periods of low energy demand, such as at night, water is pumped from Tai'an Lower Reservoir up to the upper reservoir. When energy demand is high, the water is released back down to the lower reservoir but the pump turbines that pumped the water up now reverse mode and serve as generators to produce electricity. The process is repeated as necessary and the plant serves as a peaking power plant. It is operated by State Grid Xinyuan Co.

The lower reservoir is created by a 22 m (72 ft) tall and 773 m (2,536 ft) long earth-fill dam on the Pan Wen River, known as Dahe Reservoir which was first constructed in 1950s or 1960s. It can withhold up to 22,347,000 m^{3} (18,117 acre⋅ft) of water. The upper reservoir is created by a 99.8 m (327 ft) tall and 413.8 m (1,358 ft) long concrete-face rock-fill dam. It can withhold up to 10,430,900 m^{3} (8,456.5 acre⋅ft) of water, of which 8,900,000 m^{3} (7,200 acre⋅ft) can be used for power production. Water from the upper reservoir is sent to the 1,000 MW underground power station down near the lower reservoir through two 569.15–577.10 m (1,867.3–1,893.4 ft) long headrace/penstock pipes. The drop in elevation between the upper and lower reservoir affords a hydraulic head (water drop) of 248 m (814 ft).

== See also ==
- List of pumped-storage power stations
