= Wujing Power Station =

Wujing Power Station 吴泾电厂
- Country: China
- Location: Shanghai
- Purpose: Power
- Construction began: 1958

Wujing Power Station (Chinese: 吴泾电厂), also known as Wujing Power Plant or Wujing Thermal Power Project, is a Chinese thermal power plant located in the upper reaches of Huangpu River, with a total installed capacity of 350,000 kilowatts.

In September 2017, a Chinese netizen spread a rumor that an explosion had occurred at the Wujing Power Plant in Shanghai. Minhang police imposed a three-day administrative detention on the netizen according to law.

== History ==
The first phase of the Wujing Power Station started in 1958 and was completed on January 17, 1960. Since its construction, the plant has undergone several expansions. The project is one of 156 key construction projects in China.
