= Hohhot Pumped Storage Power Station =

Dam in Hohhot, Inner Mongolia, China

- Official name: 呼和浩特抽水蓄能电站
- Country: China
- Location: Hohhot, Inner Mongolia
- Coordinates: 40°59′14″N 111°41′18″E
- Status: Operational
- Construction began: 2005
- Opening date: 2014-2015
- Owners: Inner Mongolia Hohhot Pumped Storage Power Generation Co., Ltd.

Upper reservoir
- Total capacity: 6,660,000 m^{3} (5,399 acre⋅ft)

Lower reservoir
- Total capacity: 7,170,000 m^{3} (5,813 acre⋅ft)

Power Station
- Hydraulic head: 521 m (1,709 ft)
- Turbines: 4 x 306 MW (410,000 hp) Francis pump turbines
- Installed capacity: 1,224 MW (1,641,000 hp)

The Hohhot Pumped Storage Power Station (Chinese: 呼和浩特抽水蓄能电站), also known by Huhehaote, is located 20 kilometres (12 mi) north of Hohhot in Inner Mongolia, China. It uses the pumped-storage hydroelectric method to generate electricity. The plant has an installed capacity of 1,224 megawatts (1,641,000 hp). Construction began in 2005 and the first generator was commissioned on 20 November 2014. The second generator was commissioned on 26 December 2014 and the final two were commissioned in June 2015.

== Design and operation ==
When energy demand is high, water from the upper reservoir supplies the power station with four 306 MW reversible Francis pump turbine-generators to generate electricity. After the power is generated, the water is discharged into a lower reservoir in the valley. When energy demand is low and the upper reservoir needs to be replenished, the water can be pumped back up when the pump-generators reverse into pumps. The upper reservoir is situated at an elevation of 1,940 metres (6,360 ft) and was formed by the construction of a 62.5 metres (205 ft) tall concrete-face rock-fill dam. It has a storage capacity of 6,660,000 cubic metres (5,400 acre⋅ft), of which 6,290,000 cubic metres (5,100 acre⋅ft) can be used for power generation. The lower reservoir is formed by two gravity dams constructed of roller-compacted concrete. The upstream dam at a height of 57 metres (187 ft) and serves to trap sediment in the river which is the source of water for the power plant. The second gravity dam, located downstream, is 69 metres (226 ft) tall and withholds the lower reservoir with a capacity of 7,170,000 cubic metres (5,810 acre⋅ft) of which 6,360,000 cubic metres (5,160 acre⋅ft) can be used for pumped-storage. The lower reservoir is located at an altitude of 1,400 metres (4,600 ft). The difference in elevation between the two reservoirs affords a hydraulic head (drop in water) of 521 metres (1,709 ft). It is estimated that the plant will generate 2.007 billion kWh annually but consume 2.677 billion kWh pumping. Because pumping occurs during periods of low energy demand when there is a surplus and electricity is cheap, the plant is economical.

== See also ==
- List of pumped-storage hydroelectric power stations
