= Hydroelectric power in the United States =

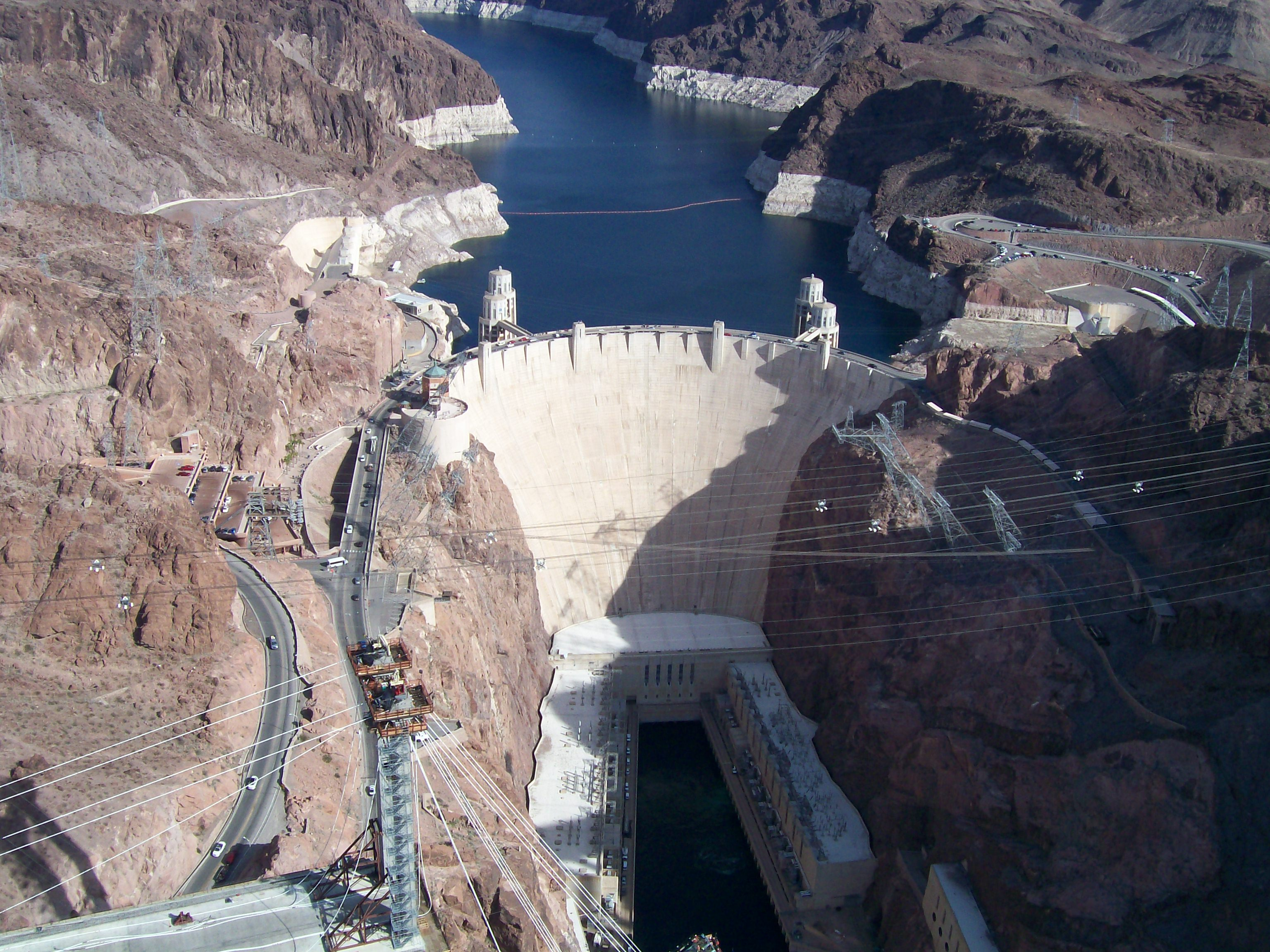
The Hoover Dam, when completed in 1936, was both the world's largest electric-power generating station and the world's largest concrete structure.

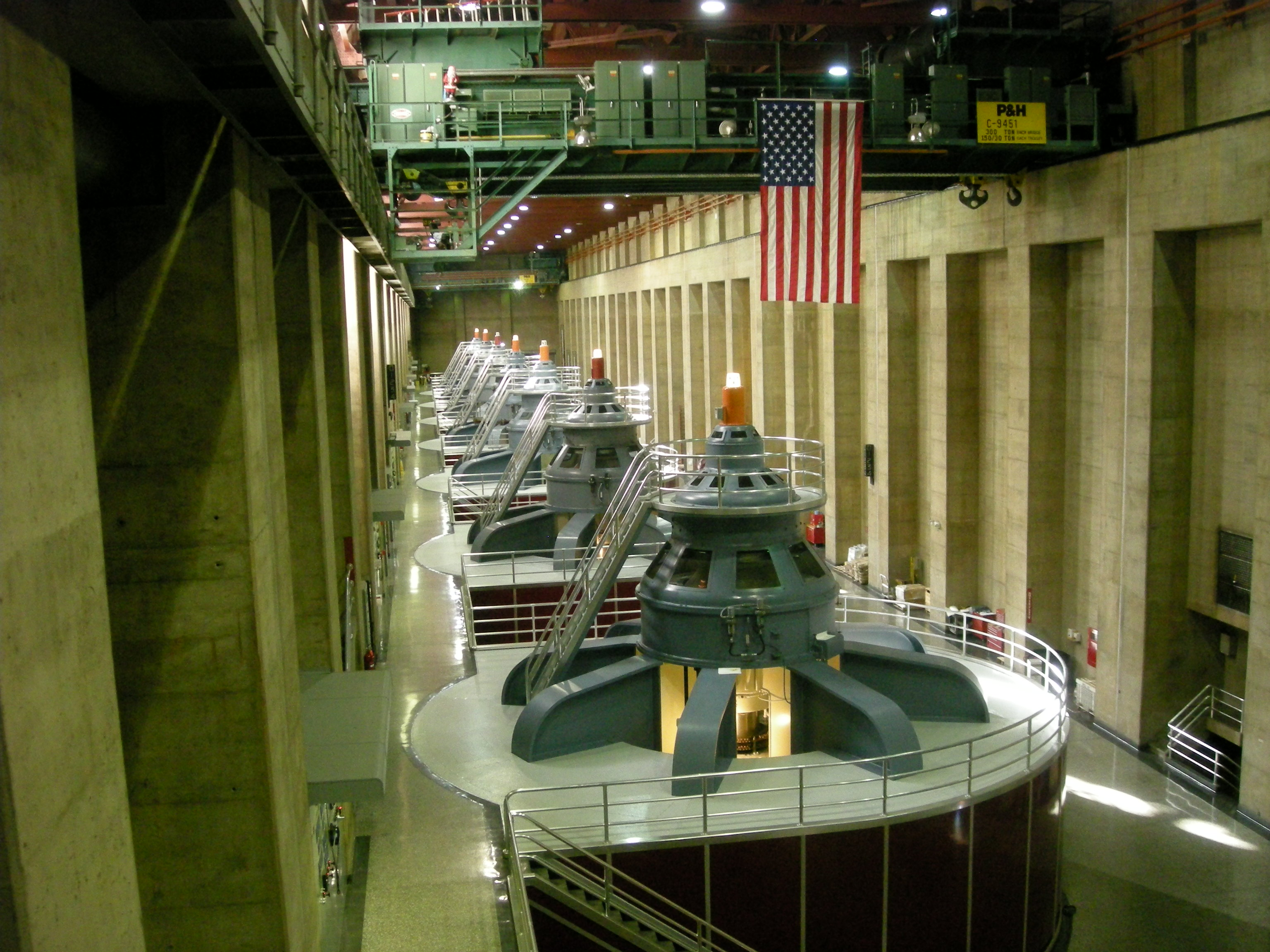
Hoover Dam power station

Hydroelectricity was, as of 2019, the second-largest renewable source of energy in both generation and nominal capacity (behind wind power) in the United States. In 2021, hydroelectric power produced 31.5% of the total renewable electricity, and 6.3% of the total U.S. electricity.

According to the International Hydropower Association, the United States is the 3rd largest producer of hydroelectric power in the world in 2021 after Brazil and China. Total installed capacity for 2020 was 102.8 GW. The installed capacity was 80 GW in 2015. The amount of hydroelectric power generated is strongly affected by changes in precipitation and surface runoff.

Hydroelectric stations exist in at least 34 US states. The largest concentration of hydroelectric generation in the US is in the Columbia River basin, which in 2012 was the source of 44% of the nation's hydroelectricity. Hydroelectricity projects such as Hoover Dam, Grand Coulee Dam, and the Tennessee Valley Authority have become iconic large construction projects.

Of note, however, is that California does not consider power generated from large hydroelectric facilities (facilities greater than 30 megawatts) to meet its strictest definition of "renewable", due to concerns over the environmental impact of large hydroelectric projects. As such, electricity generated from large hydroelectric facilities does not count toward California's strict Renewable Portfolio Standards, even though other states recognize that water is a renewable resource in the hydrological cycle. Roughly 10–15% of California's energy generation is from large hydroelectric generation that is not RPS-eligible.

The significant impact of dams on the power sector, water use, river flow, and environmental concerns requires significant policy specific to hydropower.

== History ==
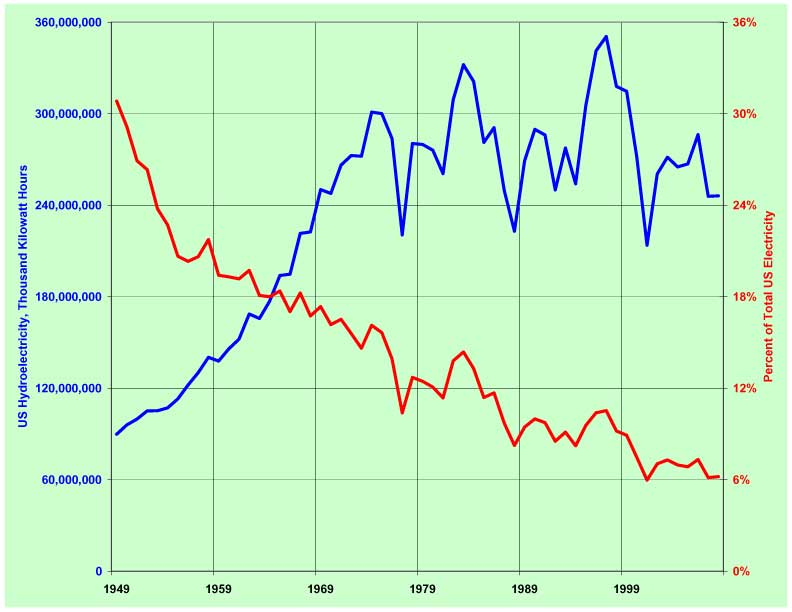
US hydropower generated 1949-2008 (blue), and hydropower as percent of total US electricity (red)

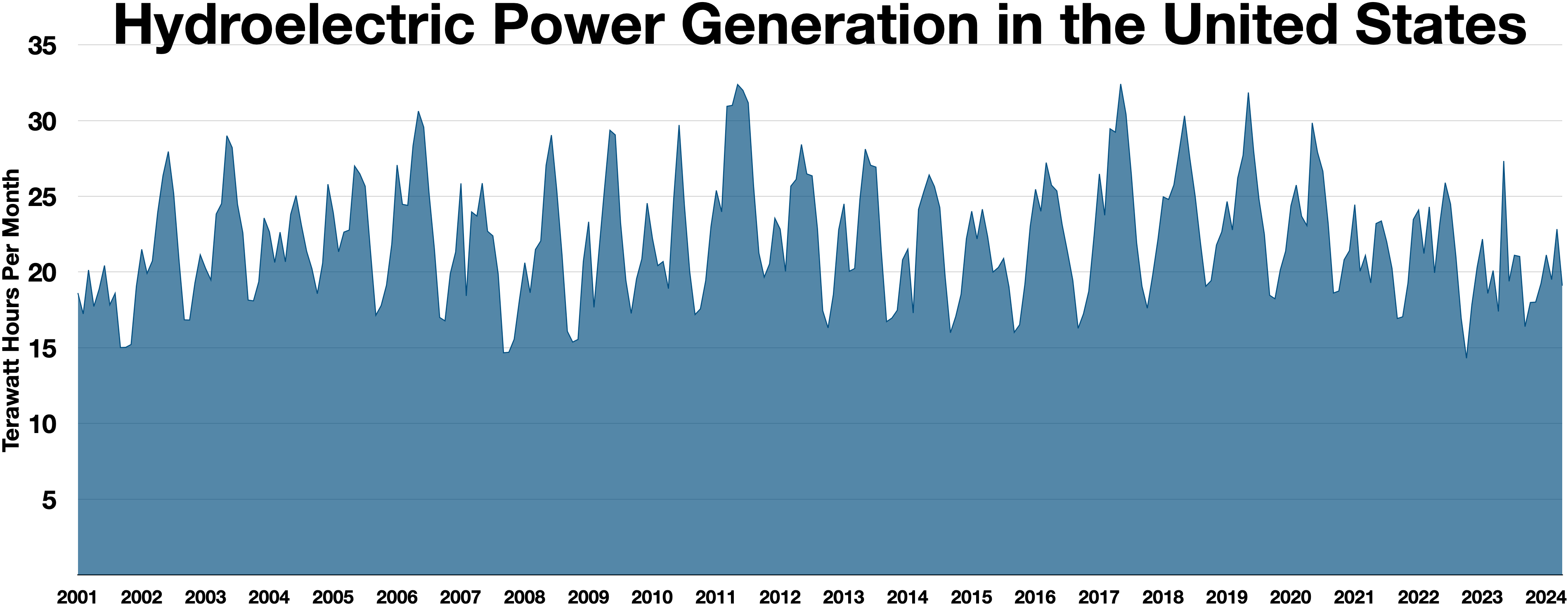
Hydroelectric power generation in the United States

The earliest hydroelectric power generation in the U.S. was utilized for lighting and employed the better understood direct current (DC) system to provide the electrical flow. It did not flow far however, with ten miles being the system's limit; solving electricity's transmission problems would come later and be the greatest incentive to the new hydroelectric water-power developments.

The first DC powerhouse was in Grand Rapids, Michigan, where the water turbine at the Wolverine Chair factory was attached to a dynamo using a mechanical belt drive to illuminate sixteen street lights. This occurred in 1880, the same year Thomas Edison produced the long-lasting incandescent filament light bulb, which was a safety and convenience improvement over existing candles, whale oil lamps and kerosene lamps inside buildings. In 1881, also using DC for lighting at Niagara Falls, Jacob F. Schoellkopf diverted part of the output from his waterwheel-powered flour mills to drive one of Charles Brush's improved generators to provide nighttime illumination for the tourists. Previously the attraction had been illuminated by burning bright calcium flares but arc-lights proved a better and cheaper alternative.

In 1882, the world's first commercial central DC hydroelectric power plant provided power for a paper mill in Appleton, Wisconsin. Just months later the first investor-owned electric utility, Edison Illuminating Company, completed the first fossil fueled electrical power plant in New York City, to compete with hydroelectric power close to an area of high demand. By 1886, between 40 and 50 hydroelectric stations were operating in the United States and in Canada. By 1888, about 200 electric companies relied on hydropower for at least part of their generation. The United States used more hydropower than any other state at the time.

Recognizing that the great hydroelectric potential of the Falls exceeded the local demand for electricity, a large power company was established nonetheless at the prime location for development; it awaited the prospect of an effective long-distance power transmission system. Westinghouse Electric won the competition, developing their plans around an alternating current system. The station was completed in 1895 and in 1896, electricity transmission 20 miles away to Buffalo, New York began. This event also began the rise to dominance of the AC system over Thomas Edison's direct current methods. Multiple permanent hydropower stations still exist on both the American and Canadian sides of the Falls, including the Robert Moses Niagara Power Plant, the third largest in the United States.

The need to provide rural development in the early 20th century was often coupled to the availability of electric power and led to large-scale projects like the Tennessee Valley Authority which created numerous dams and, sometimes controversially, flooded large areas. In the 1930s, the need for power in the Southwest led to the building of the largest concrete construction in the world at that time, the Hoover Dam. The Grand Coulee Dam was both a power and irrigation project of the 1930s that was expanded for military industrial reasons during World War II, which also saw other dams such as the TVA's Fontana Dam built.

Dam building peaked in the 1960s and few dams were built in the 1970s. The growing awareness of environmental issues with dams saw the removal of some older and smaller dams and the installation of fish ladders at others. The enormous Rampart Dam was canceled in 1967 due to environmental and economic concerns. Instead of new dams, repowering old stations has increased the capacity of several facilities. For instance, Hoover Dam replaced its generators between 1986 and 1993. The need to alter downstream waterflow for ecological reasons (eliminating invasive species, sedimentation, etc.) has led to regulated seasonal drawdowns at some dams, changing the availability of water for power generation. Droughts and increased agricultural use of water can also lead to generation limits.

According to a United States Department of Energy report, there exists over 12,000 MW of potential hydroelectricity capacity in the US existing 80,000 unpowered dams. Harnessing the currently unpowered dams could generate 45 TWhr/yr, equivalent to 16 percent of 2008 hydroelectricity generation.

According to a 2022 study, hydroelectric dams constructed prior to 1950 spurred short-run local economic growth due to cheaper power for localities. After 1950, the impact of hydropower dams on localities was more muted, most likely due to innovations such as high-tension transmission lines which dispersed the energy produced by dams to larger areas.

== Pumped storage ==
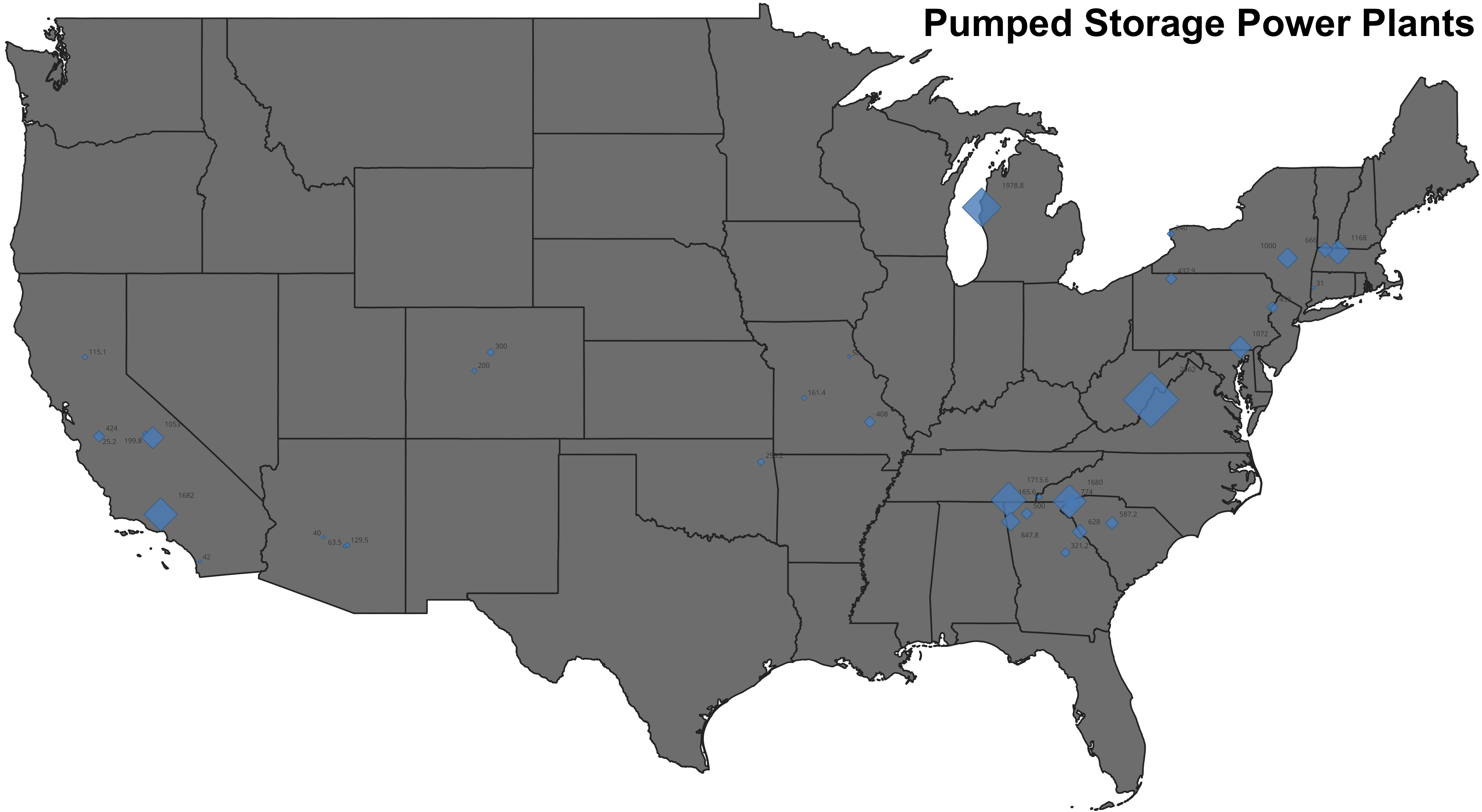
Pumped-storage facilities

Another application of hydroelectricity is Pumped-storage hydroelectricity which does not create a net gain in power, but enables peak demand balancing. Water is pumped from a lower elevation source into a higher one and only released through generators when electric demand is high. In 2009 the United States had 21.5 GW of pumped storage generating capacity, accounting for 2.5% of baseload generating capacity. This increased to a total of 22,878 MW in 2019 and 22,894 MW in 2020.

Bath County Pumped Storage Station is the largest such facility in the United States. Other stations of this type include Raccoon Mountain Pumped-Storage Plant, Bear Swamp Hydroelectric Power Station and Ludington Pumped Storage Power Plant on Lake Michigan, previously the largest in the world.

=== List of pumped storage facilities in the United States ===
Station	State	Location	Power capacity (MW)	Storage capacity (MWh)	Ref
Bath County Pumped Storage Station	Virginia	38°12′32″N 79°48′00″W	3,003	24,000	
Ludington Pumped Storage Power Plant	Michigan	43°53′37″N 86°26′43″W	2,172	19,548	
Raccoon Mountain Pumped-Storage Plant	Tennessee	35°02′55″N 85°23′48″W	1,652	36,344	
Castaic Power Plant	California	34°35′14″N 118°39′23″W	1,566	12,470	
Helms Pumped Storage Plant	California	37°02′13.78″N 118°57′53.63″W	1,200		
Blenheim-Gilboa Hydroelectric Power Station	New York	42°27′18″N 74°27′29″W	1,160	17,400	
Rocky Mountain Hydroelectric Plant	Georgia	34°21′20″N 85°18′14″W	1,095		
Northfield Mountain	Massachusetts	42°36′36.51″N 72°26′50.63″W	1,168	8,482	
Muddy Run Pumped Storage Facility	Pennsylvania	39°48′29″N 76°17′54″W	1,071		
Bad Creek Hydroelectric Station	South Carolina	35°0′40.02″N 83°0′52.23″W	1,065	25,560	

== Tidal power ==
No significant tidal power plants exist in the United States. A project was proposed and run by the Snohomish County PUD in Washington but was ended when trouble was encountered obtaining enough funding.

== Largest hydroelectric power stations ==
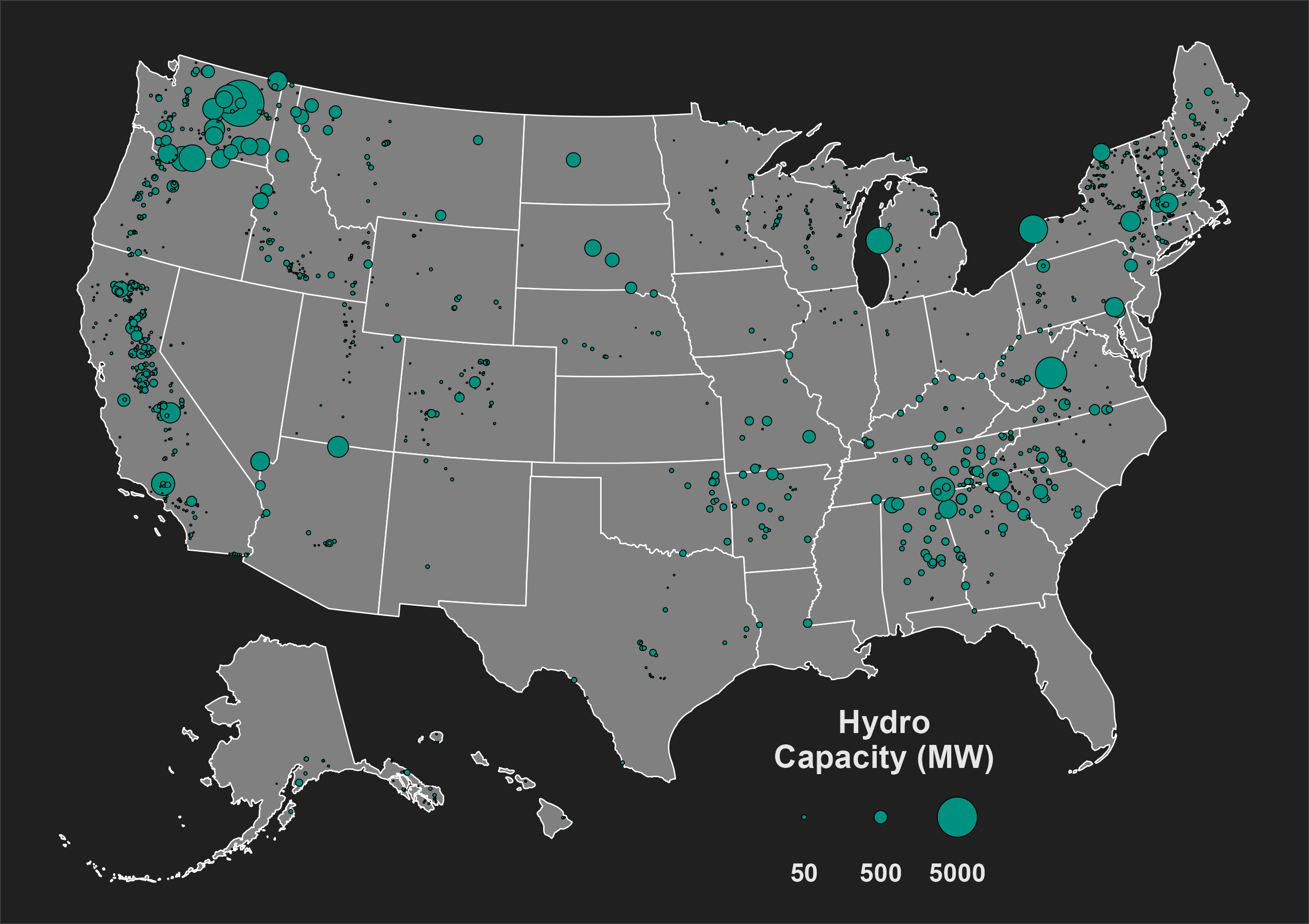
Hydro plants by capacity in 2021

This is a list of the ten largest hydroelectric power stations in the United States by installed capacity.

Rank	Name	Image	Capacity (MW)	State	Coordinates	Opening year	Type	Ref
1	Grand Coulee		6,809	Washington	47°57′21″N 118°58′54″W	1942	Reservoir (95.4%); Pumped-storage (4.6%)	
2	Bath County		3,003	Virginia	38°13′50″N 79°49′10″W	1985	Pumped-storage	
3	Robert Moses Niagara		2,675	New York	43°08′35″N 79°02′23″W	1961	Reservoir	
4	Chief Joseph		2,614	Washington	47°59′43″N 119°38′00″W	1979	Run-of-the-river	
5	John Day		2,485	Oregon; Washington	45°42′59″N 120°41′40″W	1971	Run-of-the-river	
6	Ludington		2,172	Michigan	43°53′37″N 86°26′43″W	1973	Pumped-storage	
7	Hoover		2,080	Arizona; Nevada	36°0′56″N 114°44′16″W	1936	Reservoir	
8	The Dalles		1,813	Oregon; Washington	45°36′44″N 121°08′04″W	1957	Run-of-the-river	
9	Raccoon Mountain		1,616	Tennessee	35°2′54″N 85°23′48″W	1978	Pumped-storage	
10	Castaic		1,500	California	34°35′14″N 118°39′24″W	1973	Pumped-storage	

== Statistics ==
Hydroelectric generation capacity by year in the United States
Installed conventional hydroelectric generating capacity since 2000 (MW)

Hydroelectric generation in the United States
Year	Summer capacity (GW)	Electricity generation (TWh)	Capacity factor	Yearly growth of generating capacity	Yearly growth of produced energy	Portion of renewable electricity	Portion of total electricity
2019	79.85	273.7					
2018	79.89	291.72	0.417	0.12%	-2.7%	40.9%	7.0%
2017	79.79	300.05	0.430	-0.2%	12%	43.7%	7.44%
2016	79.92	267.81	0.383	0.3%	7.50%	43.9%	6.57%
2015	79.66	249.08	0.357	0.56%	-4.0%	45.77%	6.11%
2014	79.24	258.75	0.373	0.05%	-3.66%	47.93%	6.32%
2013	79.22	268.57	0.387	0.64%	-2.78%	51.44%	6.61%
2012	78.7	276.24	0.401	0.06%	-13.50%	55.85%	6.82%
2011	78.65	319.36	0.464	-0.23%	22.74%	62.21%	7.79%
2010	78.83	260.2	0.377	0.39%	-4.85%	60.88%	6.31%
2009	78.52	273.45	0.398	0.76%	7.31%	65.47%	6.92%
2008	77.93	254.83	0.373	0.05%	2.96%	66.90%	6.19%
2007	77.89	247.51	0.363	0.09%	-14.43%	70.18%	5.95%
2006	77.82	289.25	0.424	0.36%	7.00%	74.97%	7.12%
2005	77.54	270.32	0.398	-0.13%	0.71%	75.57%	6.67%
2004	77.64	268.42	0.395	-1.33%	-2.68%	76.36%	6.76%
2003		275.8					
2002		264.33					
2001		216.96					
2000		275.57					

United States conventional hydroelectric generation (GWh)
Year	Total	% of total	Jan	Feb	Mar	Apr	May	Jun	Jul	Aug	Sep	Oct	Nov	Dec
2001	216,962		18,852	17,473	20,477	18,013	19,176	20,728	18,079	18,914	15,256	15,235	15,413	19,346
2002	264,331		21,795	20,192	21,009	24,247	26,663	28,213	25,471	21,084	17,087	17,171	19,730	21,669
2003	275,804		20,600	19,780	24,202	24,759	29,395	28,586	24,843	22,972	18,480	18,428	19,715	24,044
2004	268,417		22,983	20,914	22,914	20,888	24,020	25,252	23,318	21,592	20,525	18,863	20,937	26,211
2005	270,322		24,272	21,607	22,936	23,058	27,279	26,783	25,957	21,566	17,364	18,006	19,353	22,141
2006	289,246		27,437	24,762	24,625	28,556	30,818	29,757	25,439	21,728	17,201	17,055	20,272	21,596
2007	247,512		26,045	18,567	24,163	23,891	26,047	22,817	22,478	19,941	14,743	14,796	15,682	18,342
2008	254,830		20,779	18,789	21,669	22,234	27,221	29,177	25,555	21,229	16,178	15,470	15,668	20,861
2009	273,445		23,490	17,812	21,827	25,770	29,560	29,233	23,385	19,580	17,359	19,691	21,008	24,730
2010	260,204		22,383	20,590	20,886	19,097	25,079	29,854	24,517	20,119	17,265	17,683	19,562	23,169
2011	319,355		25,531	24,131	31,134	31,194	32,587	32,151	31,285	25,764	21,378	19,787	20,681	23,732
2012	276,240	6.82%	23,107	20,284	25,907	26,295	28,641	26,658	26,491	23,034	17,604	16,502	18,733	22,984
2013	268,565	6.61%	24,829	20,418	20,534	25,097	28,450	27,384	27,255	21,633	16,961	17,199	17,677	21,128
2014	259,366	6.34%	21,634	17,396	24,257	25,440	26,544	25,744	24,357	19,807	16,074	17,159	18,625	22,329
2015	249,079	6.11%	24,138	22,286	24,281	22,471	20,125	20,414	21,014	19,122	16,094	16,630	19,338	23,166
2016	267,813	6.57%	25,615	24,139	27,390	25,878	25,486	23,237	21,455	19,570	16,368	17,339	18,808	22,528
2017	300,332	7.44%	26,628	23,882	29,613	29,409	32,607	30,575	26,598	22,034	19,152	17,698	19,888	22,248
2018	292,524	7%	25,064	24,902	25,861	28,115	30,444	27,597	25,100	22,017	19,166	19,548	21,913	22,797
2019	287,875	6.98%	24,798	22,881	26,334	27,820	31,982	28,078	24,875	22,579	18,526	18,306	20,218	21,478
2020	285,274	7.11%	24,498	25,868	23,823	23,194	29,976	27,999	26,742	23,284	18,679	18,810	20,893	21,508
2021	260,225	6.33%	25,814	21,624	21,574	19,201	22,795	24,075	22,113	20,954	17,966	17,999	20,460	25,650
2022	261,999	6.17%	26,213	22,904	25,356	19,573	23,071	26,892	24,193	21,617	16,812	14,638	18,764	21,870
2023	128,456	6.51%	22,954	19,338	20,630	17,917	27,983	19,632						
Last entry, % of total			6.61%	6.23%	6.25%	5.97%	8.54%	5.5%	5.71%	5.24%	4.79%	5.97%	5.81%	6.01%

United States pumped storage generation (GWh)
Year	Total	% of total	Jan	Feb	Mar	Apr	May	Jun	Jul	Aug	Sep	Oct	Nov	Dec
2001	-8,825		-589	-707	-773	-796	-623	-774	-871	-715	-928	-615	-811	-623
2002	-8,744		-750	-586	-684	-585	-539	-863	-998	-935	-777	-681	-666	-680
2003	-8,535		-802	-759	-778	-546	-597	-762	-745	-806	-769	-615	-695	-661
2004	-8,488		-768	-692	-653	-669	-689	-718	-693	-818	-770	-703	-665	-650
2005	-6,558		-725	-346	-497	-338	-466	-415	-625	-623	-680	-611	-554	-678
2006	-6,558		-533	-447	-435	-587	-444	-423	-638	-695	-629	-507	-553	-667
2007	-6,897		-572	-447	-458	-374	-547	-523	-595	-651	-743	-760	-662	-565
2008	-6,289		-746	-451	-553	-132	-587	-372	-799	-648	-517	-497	-489	-498
2009	-4,626		-501	-413	-315	-272	-349	-226	-491	-613	-348	-385	-330	-383
2010	-5,502		-565	-351	-325	-335	-441	-472	-557	-600	-421	-438	-467	-530
2011	-6,422		-659	-413	-349	-466	-417	-567	-708	-692	-583	-601	-458	-509
2012	-4,951		-348	-237	-281	-265	-371	-507	-619	-529	-431	-378	-409	-576
2013	-4,682		-465	-320	-462	-292	-334	-358	-340	-465	-439	-373	-413	-421
2014	-6,174		-290	-445	-421	-378	-601	-653	-545	-840	-542	-448	-531	-480
2015	-5,090		-551	-456	-409	-214	-370	-398	-513	-626	-544	-443	-285	-281
2016	-6,687		-312	-399	-384	-452	-321	-497	-784	-902	-715	-561	-607	-753
2017	-6,494		-435	-508	-521	-439	-423	-568	-759	-638	-606	-463	-478	-656
2018	-5,903		-547	-315	-490	-377	-390	-433	-644	-747	-603	-492	-343	-522
2019	-5,260		-323	-389	-409	-103	-368	-385	-622	-579	-671	-373	-509	-529
2020	-5,323		-377	-247	-353	-325	-367	-499	-686	-784	-525	-423	-369	-368
2021	-5,112		-424	-425	-236	-197	-416	-376	-685	-670	-434	-427	-377	-445
2022	-6,034		-493	-412	-318	-265	-467	-591	-768	-640	-598	-434	-495	-554
2023	-2,953		-611	-448	-538	-313	-483	-560						

== Non-powered dams hydroelectric potential ==
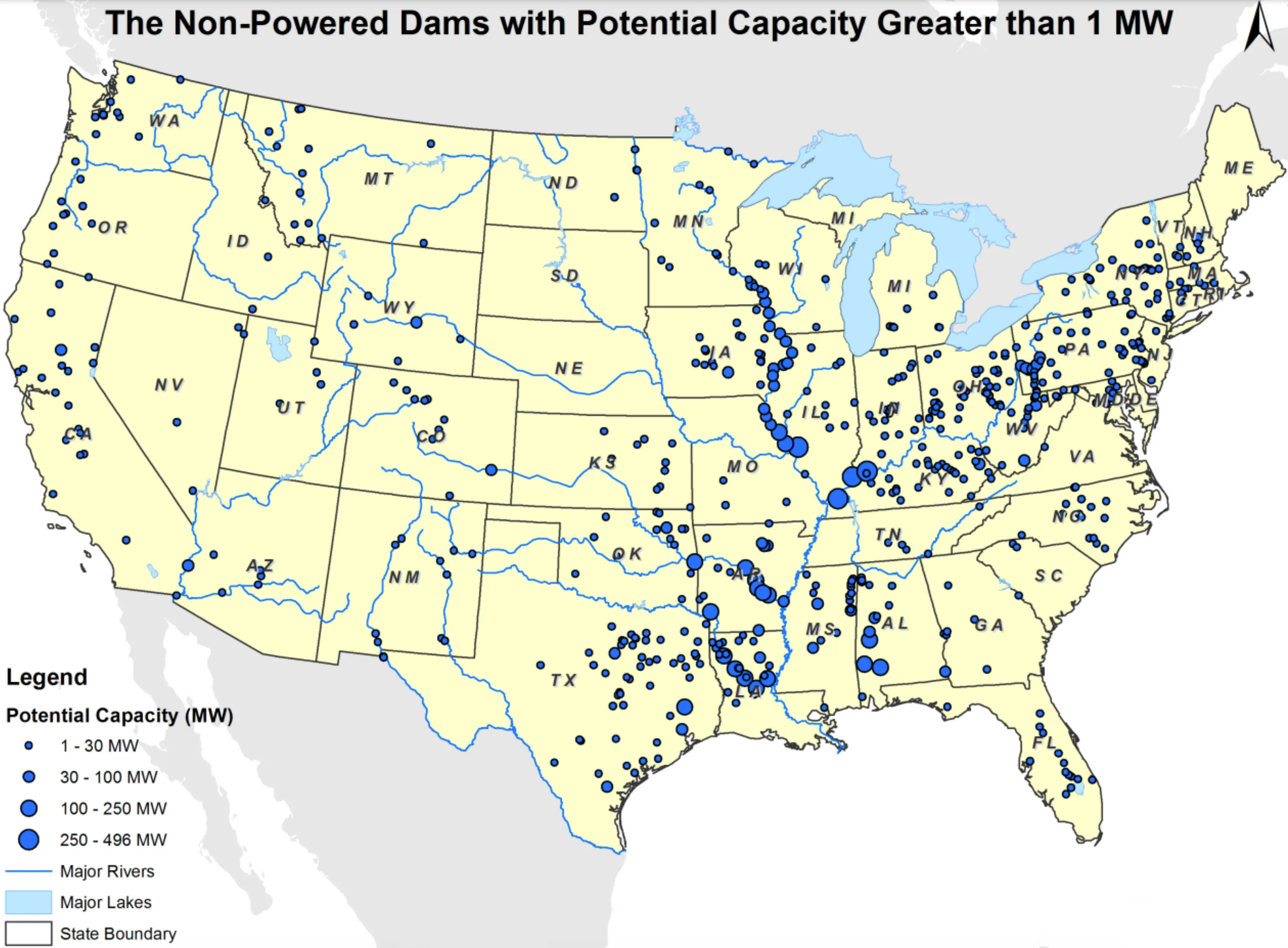
Non-powered dams map

There are over 80,000 non-powered dams (NPDs) in the United States that could add 12 GW of nameplate capacity or 45 terawatt hours (TWh) per year. The top 100 NPDs alone could add 8 GW, which could add 15% to hydroelectric generation of the 78 GW that was online in 2012. 81 of the top 100 NPDs are owned by the Army Corps of Engineers. The U.S. Bureau of Reclamation owns NPDs that could generate 260 MW.

Dam name	Owner name	City	County	State	River name	Year completed	Estimated head (feet)	Flow (cfs)	Generation (MWh)	Estimated potential nameplate capacity (MW)
John T. Myers Locks and Dam	Corps of Engineers	Uniontown	Union	KY / IN	Ohio	1975	18.0	147,134	1,661,216	395.2
Newburgh Lock and Dam	Corps of Engineers	Scuffletown	Henderson	KY / IN	Ohio	1975	16.0	133,554	1,340,348	318.9
Melvin Price Locks and Dam	Corps of Engineers	Alton	Madison	IL / MO	Mississippi	1990	24.0	97,508	1,467,886	299.3
Coffeeville Lock and Dam	Corps of Engineers	Coffeeville	Clarke	AL	Tombigbee	1962	34.0	26,470	564,511	241.7
Demopolis Lock and Dam	Corps of Engineers	Demopolis	Marengo	AL	Tombigbee	1955	40.0	22,113	554,822	237.6
Claiborne Lock and Dam	Corps of Engineers	Claiborne Landing	Monroe	AL	Alabama	1969	30.0	28,340	533,297	228.3
Red River Lock and Dam No. 3	Corps of Engineers	Colfax	Natchitoches	LA	Red	1991	31.0	30,192	587,080	187.0
David D. Terry Lock and Dam	Corps of Engineers	Pine Bluff	Pulaski	AR	Arkansas	1968	18.0	45,857	517,745	164.9
Joe Hardin Lock and Dam	Corps of Engineers	Grady	Lincoln	AR	Arkansas	1968	20.0	48,420	607,436	161.0
Colonel Charles D. Maynard Lock and Dam	Corps of Engineers	Redfield	Jefferson	AR	Arkansas	1968	17.0	45,970	490,195	156.1
Lock and Dam No. 25	Corps of Engineers	Winfield	Lincoln	MO / IL	Mississippi	1939	15.0	76,764	722,259	147.3
Lock and Dam No. 24	Corps of Engineers	Clarksville	Pike	MO / IL	Mississippi	1940	15.0	76,366	718,512	146.5
Toad Suck Lock and Dam	Corps of Engineers	Conway	Faulkner	AR	Arkansas	1969	16.0	45,336	454,988	144.9
Russell B. Long Lock and Dam	Corps of Engineers	Grand Ecore	Natchitoches	LA	Red	1995	25.0	28,663	449,465	143.1
W. D. Mayo Lock and Dam	Corps of Engineers	Fort Coffee	LeFlore	OK	Arkansas	1970	21.0	32,145	423,426	134.9
Emmett Sanders Lock and Dam	Corps of Engineers	Pine Bluff	Jefferson	AR	Arkansas	1968	14.0	46,007	404,007	128.7
Joe D. Waggonner Jr. Lock and Dam	Corps of Engineers	Simmesport	Catahoula	LA	Red	1985	25.0	25,242	395,825	126.1
John Overton Lock and Dam	Corps of Engineers	Simmesport	Rapides	LA	Red	1987	24.0	31,322	471,522	125.0
Jonesville Lock and Dam	Corps of Engineers	Simmesport	Catahoula	LA	Black	1972	30.0	24,577	462,472	122.6
Millwood Dam	Corps of Engineers	Ashdown	Little River	AR	Little	1966	74.0	6,818	316,458	100.8
Montgomery Locks and Dam	Corps of Engineers	Monaca	Beaver	PA	Ohio	1936	18.0	37,166	419,626	99.8
Mississippi River Lock and Dam No. 22	Corps of Engineers	Saverton	Ralls	MO / IL	Mississippi	1938	10.0	74,224	465,570	94.9

=== Other non-powered dams ===
- A. I. Selden Dam (Alabama)
- Imperial Dam (California/Arizona)
- Palo Verde Dam (California)
- Chatfield Dam (Colorado)
- John Martin Reservoir (Colorado)
- Olmsted Locks and Dam (Illinois/Kentucky)
- Red Rock Dam (Iowa)
- Saylorville Lake (Iowa)
- Barren River Lake Dam (Kentucky)
- Dewey Dam (Kentucky)
- Coon Rapids Dam (Minnesota)
- Arkabutla Lake (Mississippi)
- Grenada Dam (Mississippi)
- John C. Stennis Lock and Dam (Mississippi)
- Ross Barnett Reservoir (Mississippi)
- Jordan Lake (North Carolina)
- Lake Wister (Oklahoma)
- Oologah Lake (Oklahoma)
- Adam T. Bower Memorial Dam (Pennsylvania)
- Belton Dam (Texas)
- De Cordova Bend Dam (Texas)
- Lake Corpus Christi (Texas)
- Lake Houston Dam (Texas)
- Howard A. Hanson Dam (Washington)
- Bluestone Dam (West Virginia)
- Sutton Lake (West Virginia)
- Tygart Dam (West Virginia)
- Lake Altoona (Wisconsin)

== See also ==
- List of reservoirs and dams in the United States
- List of the tallest dams in the United States
- List of dams in the Columbia River watershed
- Tennessee Valley Authority

US renewables:

- Renewable energy in the United States
- Wind power in the United States
- Solar power in the United States
- Geothermal energy in the United States
- Biofuels in the United States
- List of renewable energy companies in the United States

General:

- Electricity sector in the United States

International:

- List of renewable energy topics by country
