= Eugene C. Whitney =

Eugene C. Whitney (26 August 1913 – 22 March 1998) was a celebrated power engineer who designed hydroelectric turbines and generators at Westinghouse Electric Company. The pinnacle of his career was the machinery for the expansion of the Grand Coulee Dam to add the #3 Powerhouse in 1966–74.

== Biography ==
Whitney earned a bachelor's degree in electrical engineering from the University of Michigan and then went to work for Westinghouse.

Whitney's turbine generators for the Grand Coulee Dam are the largest in the world, six times larger than those at Niagara Falls which were also the largest when built. The turbine generators had to be shipped as parts and assembled at the dam. His Westinghouse manager recalled being surprised when they worked perfectly from the start.

Gene designed and installed turbine generators for hydroelectric and pumped-storage hydroelectric facilities throughout the United States. When his equipment was installed at the Muddy Run Pumped Storage Facility, Gene "was present when the machines were first to be started. The operator was reluctant to take the first step. Gene said, 'Call your boss.' The boss said, 'If Gene says to start the machines, start them.' So they did, and water rose from the lower Susquehanna River to the upper reservoir, 400 feet above".

Whitney retired from Westinghouse in 1974 and became an engineering consultant. He consulted for the Itaipu dam project in Brazil.

Whitney received the Westinghouse Order of Merit in 1964 and the IEEE's Nikola Tesla Award in 1985. He was elected into the National Academy of Engineering in 1986. The election citation reads: "For outstanding contributions to the theory of electrical machines, and for the design of many of the world's largest hydrogenerators.". "Whitney is an IEEE Fellow and a member of the IEEE Rotating Machinery, Synchronous and the Power Generation Hydraulic subcommittees".
