= Nasar (disambiguation) =

Nasar is 9th-century Byzantine admiral.

Nasar may also refer to:

- Nasar (Pashtun tribe), Pashtun tribe

== Surname ==
- Mustafa Setmariam Nasar (born 1958), suspected al-Qaeda member and writer
- Sardar Yaqoob Khan Nasar (born 1947), Pakistani politician
- Syed Abu Nasar (1932–2012), Professor of Electrical Engineering
- Sylvia Nasar (born 1947), German-born American economist and author

== Places ==
- Nasar, Iran, a village in Razavi Khorasan Province, Iran
- Nasar Rural District, an administrative subdivision of Khuzestan Province, Iran

== See also ==
- Hajar an-Nasar, archeological site
- Nassar (born 1958), Indian actor mainly in Tamil films
