= IEEE Nikola Tesla Award =

Power engineering award

- Awarded for: Outstanding contributions to the generation and utilization of electric power
- Presented by: Institute of Electrical and Electronics Engineers
- First award: 1975
- Website: IEEE Nikola Tesla Award

The IEEE Nikola Tesla Award is a Technical Field Award given annually to an individual or team that has made an outstanding contribution to the generation or utilization of electric power. It is awarded by the Board of Directors of the IEEE. The award is named in honor of Nikola Tesla. This award may be presented to an individual or a team.

The award was established in 1975, and its first recipient was Leon T. Rosenberg, who was given the award in 1976 "for his half-century of development and design of large steam turbine driven generators and his important contributions to literature." The actual award is a plaque and honorarium.

== Recipients ==
- 2027 – Pragasen Pillay
  For contributions to the modeling, design and application of electric machines in industrial, transportation and renewable energy applications
- 2026 – Nicola Bianchi
  For contributions to the analysis, design, and application of synchronous permanent magnet and reluctance machines.
- 2025 – Scott D. Sudhoff
  For contributions to the analysis and design of electric machinery and power electronic systems.
- 2024 – Aldo Boglieltti, Professor, Department of Energy, Politecnico di Torino, Torino, Italy
  For contributions to the magnetic and thermal modeling, design, and characterization of electrical machines.
- 2023 – Kiruba S. Haran, Professor, University of Illinois, Urbana, Illinois, USA
  For contributions to advanced high-power density electrical machinery and high-temperature, super-conducting technology applications
- 2022 – Peter W. Sauer, Grainger Chair Emeritus Professor of Electrical Engineering, University of Illinois, Urbana, Illinois, USA
  For contributions to dynamic modeling and simulation of synchronous generators and for leadership in power engineering education.
- 2021 – Zi-Qiang Zhu, Professor, Department of Electronic and Electrical Engineering, University of Sheffield, Sheffield, South Yorkshire, United Kingdom
  For contributions to the design, modeling, control, and application of ac permanent magnet machines and drives.
- 2020 – Akira Chiba, Professor, Tokyo Institute of Technology, Tokyo Japan
  For contributions to bearingless and reluctance motors.
- 2019 – Tomy Sebastian, Director; Motor Drive Systems, Halla Mechatronics, Bay City, Michigan, United States
  For contributions to the design and application of high-performance permanent magnet synchronous machines to electric power steering
- 2018 – Longya Xu, Professor, The Ohio State University, Columbus, Ohio, USA
  For contributions to design and control of efficient electric machines for wind power generation and electrified vehicles.
- 2017 – Adel Razek, Senior Research Director (Emeritus) and Professor (Honorary), The National Center for Scientific Research CNRS and CentraleSupelec, Gif Sur Yvette, France
  For contributions to coupled multiphysics modeling and design of electromagnetic systems.
- 2016 – Bruno Lequesne, President, E-Motors Consulting, LLC, Menomonee Falls, Wisconsin, USA
  For contributions to the design and analysis of actuators, sensors, and motors for automotive applications.
- 2015 – Ion Gheorghe Boldea, Professor Emeritus, Politehnica University of Timișoara, Timișoara, Romania
  For contributions to the design and control of rotating and linear electric machines for industry applications.
- 2014 – Hamid A. Toliyat, Texas A&M University (College Station, Texas)
  For contributions to the design, analysis, and control of fault-tolerant multiphase electric machines.
- 2013 - Norio Takahashi (scientist)|Norio Takahashi, Okayama University (Okayama, Japan)
  For contributions to finite element modeling, analysis, and optimal design tools of electrical machines.
- 2012 – Manoj R. Shah, General Electric (Niskayuna, New York)
  For advancements in electromagnetic design and analysis of electrical machines.
- 2011 – Nady Boules, General Motors (Warren, Michigan)
  For contributions to the design, analysis and optimization of permanent magnet machines and for advancing their utilization in the automotive industry.
- 2010 – Paul C. Krause, Purdue University (West Lafayette, Indiana)
  For outstanding contributions to the analysis of electric machinery using reference frame theory.
- 2009 – Donald Wayne Novotny, University of Wisconsin–Madison (Madison, Wisconsin)
  For pioneering contributions to the analysis and understanding of ac machine dynamic behavior and performance in adjustable-speed drives.
- 2008 – Timothy J. E. Miller, University of Glasgow (Glasgow, Scotland)
  For outstanding contributions to the advancement of computer-based design and analysis of electric machines and their industrial dissemination.
- 2007 – Thomas W. Nehl, Delphi Research Labs (Shelby Township, Michigan)
  For pioneering contributions to the simulation and design of electromechanical drives and actuators for automotive applications.
- 2006 – Konrad Reichert, ETH Zentrum (Zurich, Switzerland)
  For contributions to the development of numerical methods and computer analysis and simulation of electrical machines and devices.
- 2005 – Thomas M. Jahns, Grainger Professor of Power Electronics and Electrical Machines University of Wisconsin–Madison, Madison, Wisconsin
  For pioneering contributions to the design and application of AC permanent magnet machines.
- 2004 – Sheppard Joel Salon, Professor, Electrical, Computers, and Systems Engineering Department, Rensselaer Polytechnic Institute Troy, New York
  For pioneering and outstanding contributions to transient finite element computation of electric machines coupled to electronic circuits; and to electro-mechanical devices.
- 2003 – Austin H. Bonnett, Retired-Vice President Technology Emeritus, Emerson Electric, Elec Apparatus Service Association (EASA), Natitional Electric Manufacturers Association (NEMA), Electric Power Research Institute (EPRI), and United States Department of Energy and Affiliates (DOE)
  For leadership in the development and application of design standards, maintenance technology, and operating practices to optimize induction motor performance.
- 2002 – James L Kirtley Jr, Professor, Electrical Engineering, Massachusetts Institute of Technology Cambridge, Massachusetts
  For contributions to the theoretical analysis, design, and construction of high performance rotating electric machinery, including superconducting turbogenerators.
- 2001 - Steve Williamson, University of Manchester - Manchester, United Kingdom
  For the development of advanced mathematical models and computational tools for induction machine design.
- 2000 - Syed Abu Nasar, University of Kentucky - Lexington, Kentucky
  For leadership in the research, development and design of linear and rotating machines, and contributions to electrical engineering education.
- 1999 - Nabeel Aly Omar Demerdash, Professor and Past Chairman of the Department of Electrical and Computer Engineering Marquette University, Milwaukee, Wisconsin
  For pioneering contributions to electric machine and drive system design using coupled finite-element and electrical network models.
- 1998 - Paul Dandeno, University of Toronto - Toronto, Ontario, Canada
  For contribution to modelling and application of synchronous machines, power system controls, and stability analysis.
- 1997 - Prabhashankar Kundur, Powertech Labs Inc. - Surrey, British Columbia, Canada
  For contribution to modeling and application of synchronous machines, power system controls, and stability analysis.
- 1996 - John A. Tegopoulos, National Technical University of Athens - Athens, Greece
  For pioneering contributions in electrical machine design.
- 1995 - Thomas A. Lipo, University of Wisconsin–Madison
  For pioneering contributions to the simulation and application of electric machinery in solid-state ac motor drives.
- 1994 - Carl Flick, Techno-Lexic - Winter Park, Florida, Westinghouse Electric Corporation, Orlando, Florida
  For long-term creative contributions and leadership in the design and development of advanced high-speed generators.
- 1993 - Madabushi V. K. Chari, General Electric Co. - Schenectady, New York
  For pioneering contributions to finite element computations of nonlinear electromagnetic fields for design and analysis of electric machinery.
- 1992 - Thomas Herbert Barton, University of Calgary, Canada
  For the practical application of the generalized theory of electrical machines to A.C. and D.C. drives.
- 1991 - Michel E. Poloujadoff, Univ. Pierre et Marie Curie - Paris, France
  For contributions to the theory of electrical machinery and its application to linear induction motors.
- 1990 - Gordon R. Slemon, University of Toronto, Toronto, Ontario, Canada
  For application of modeling in electric power equipment and technical leadership in power education.
- 1989 - Dietrich R. Lambrecht, Siemens AG - Ruhr, W. Germany
  For leadership and contributions to advances in large turbine generator design, construction, and application.
- 1988 - Edward I. King, Westinghouse Electric Corporation. - Orlando, Florida
  For contributions to computer-aided analysis and design of large rotating machinery.
- 1987 - J. Coleman White, Electric Power Research Institute - Palo Alto, CA
  For contributions to the research, development, and design of ac and dc rotating machines.
- 1986 - Eric R. Laithwaite, The Imperial College of Science, Technology and Medicine - London, England
  For contributions to the development and understanding of electric machines and especially of the linear induction motor.
- 1985 - Eugene C. Whitney, Westinghouse Electric Corporation - Pittsburgh, PA
  For outstanding contributions to the development, design, and construction of large rotating electric machinery.
- 1984 - Herbert H. Woodson, University of Texas at Austin - Austin, Texas
  For contributions to power generation technology particularly in superconducting generators and magnetohydrodynamic generators.
- 1983 - NO AWARD
- 1982 - Sakae Yamamura, University of Tokyo, Tokyo, Japan
  For contributions to the theory of linear induction motors and the development of magnetic levitation of track vehicles.
- 1981 - Dean B. Harrington, General Electric Co. - Schenectady, New York
  For contributions to the design, development and performance analysis of large steam turbine-generators.
- 1980 - Philip H. Trickey, Duke University - Durham, North Carolina
  For advancement in the development and application of Tesla's theories through precise designs of small induction machines.
- 1979 - John W. Batchelor, Westinghouse Electric Corporation - E. Pittsburgh, PA
  For contributions to the design of large turbine driven generators and the development of related international standards.
- 1978 - Charles H. Holley, General Electric Co. - Schenectady, New York
  For contributions to the evolution of turbine generator designs with achievement in performance and reliability.
- 1977 - Cyril G. Veinott, University of Missouri
  For his leadership in development and application of small induction motors.
- 1976 - Leon T. Rosenberg, Allis-Chalmers Pwr. Sys. Inc. - West Allis, WI
  For his half-century of development and design of large steam turbine driven generators and his important contributions to literature.

== See also ==
- List of engineering awards
- List of prizes named after people
