= Gordon Slemon =

Dean of the University of Toronto Faculty of Applied Science and Engineering
- In office 1979–1986
- Preceded by: Bernard Etkin
- Succeeded by: Gary Heinke

Personal details
- Born: Gordon Richard Slemon; August 15, 1924 Bowmanville, Ontario
- Died: September 26, 2011 (aged 87)
- Awards: Order of Canada

Gordon Richard Slemon, OC (August 15, 1924 – September 26, 2011) was a Canadian electrical engineer and professor.

Born in Bowmanville, Ontario, he received a B.A.Sc. in electrical engineering in 1946 and a M.A.Sc. in electrical engineering in 1948 from the University of Toronto. He received a Ph.D. from the University of London in 1952.

From 1953 to 1955, he was an assistant professor at the Nova Scotia Technical College. In 1955, he joined the University of Toronto as an associate professor and was appointed a professor in 1964. He was made a professor emeritus in 1990. From 1966 to 1976, he was the head of the Department of Electrical Engineering and from 1979 to 1986 was dean of the Faculty of Applied Science and Engineering.

He is the co-author of Scientific Basis of Electrical Engineering (1961), Electric Machinery (1979), and Power Semiconductor Drives (1984). He is the author of Magnetoelectric Devices (1966) and Electric Machines and Drives (1992).

In 1994, he was made an Officer of the Order of Canada for his work as "a world authority on the analysis, design and development of electric machines and controlled drive systems, he has dedicated his professional life to teaching and research in engineering". In 1990, he was awarded the IEEE Nikola Tesla Award, given each year to a team or to an individual that has made an outstanding contribution to the generation or utilization of electric power. He was elected to Fellow of the Canadian Academy of Engineering. In 2011, he received the Engineering Institute of Canada's highest award, the Sir John Kennedy Medal.
