= Bath County Pumped Storage Station =

Pumped storage energy generator in Virginia, United States

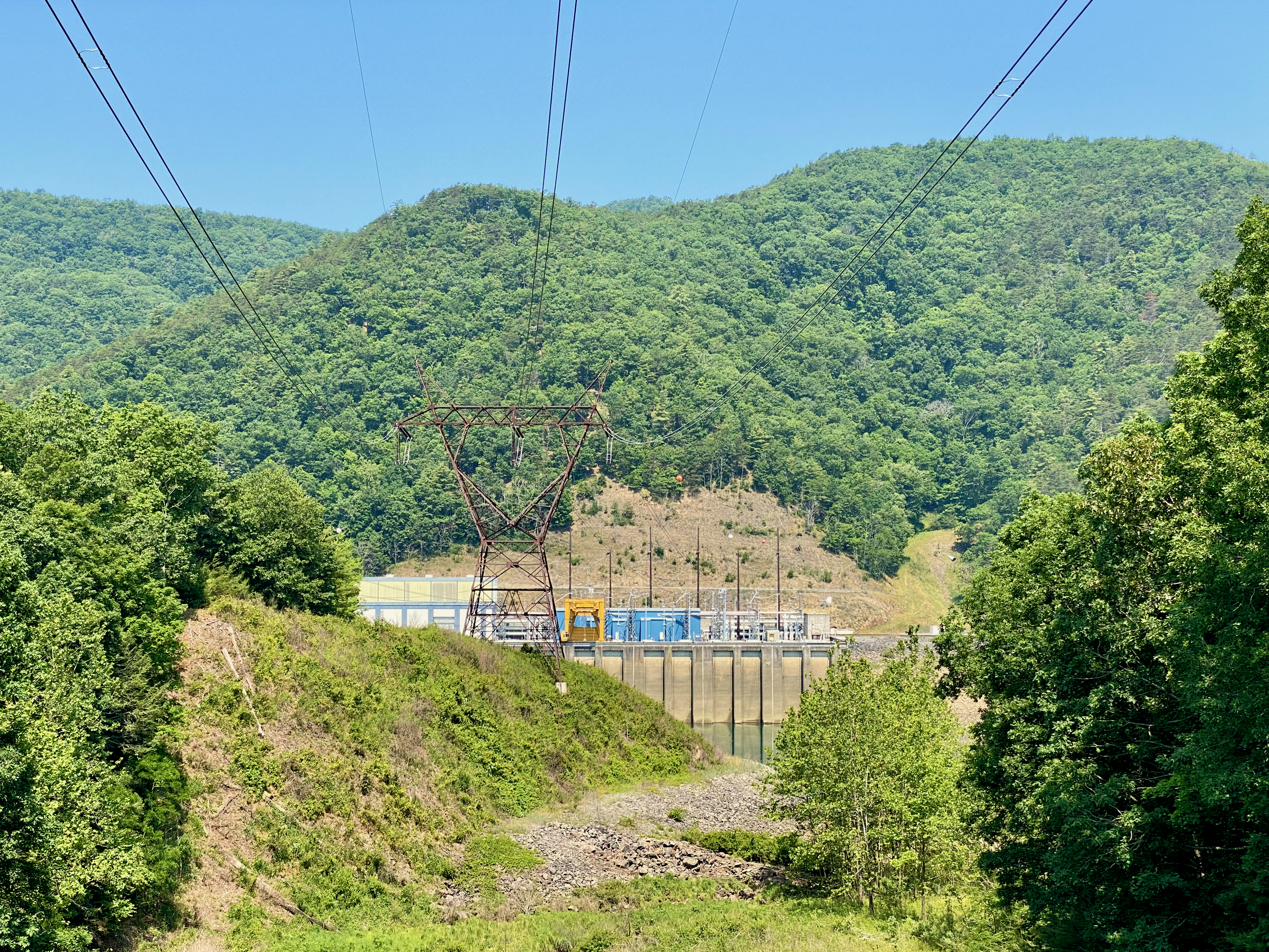

- Location within Virginia
- Interactive map of Bath County Pumped Storage Station
- Country: United States
- Location: Bath County, Virginia
- Coordinates: 38°13′50″N 79°49′10″W
- Purpose: Power
- Status: Operational
- Construction began: March 1977; 49 years ago
- Opening date: December 1985; 40 years ago
- Construction cost: US$1.6 billion ($4.79 billion in 2025 dollars)
- Owners: Dominion Generation (60%); LS Power (24%); FirstEnergy (16%)

Upper dam and spillways
- Type of dam: Embankment dam
- Height (foundation): 460 ft (140 m)
- Length: 2,200 ft (670 m)
- Dam volume: 18,000,000 yd^{3} (14,000,000 m^{3})

Upper reservoir
- Total capacity: 35,599 acre⋅ft (43,911,000 m^{3})
- Surface area: 265 acres (107 ha)

Lower dam and spillways
- Type of dam: Embankment dam
- Height (foundation): 135 ft (41 m)
- Length: 2,400 ft (730 m)
- Dam volume: 4,000,000 yd^{3} (3,100,000 m^{3})
- Spillways: 1

Lower reservoir
- Total capacity: 27,927 acre⋅ft (34,447,000 m^{3})
- Surface area: 555 acres (225 ha)

Power Station
- Coordinates: 38°12′32″N 79°48′00″W
- Commission date: December 1985; 40 years ago
- Type: Pumped-storage
- Hydraulic head: 1,262 feet (385 m)
- Pump-generators: 6 × 480/500.5 MW Francis pump-turbines
- Installed capacity: 3003 MW
- Overall efficiency: 79%
- Storage capacity: 11 hours (24,000 MWh)
- 2017 generation: -935 GW·h
- Website; Bath County Pumped Storage Station Website

The Bath County Pumped Storage Station is a pumped storage hydroelectric power plant with a maximum generation capacity of 3,003 MW, an average of 2,772 MW, and a total storage capacity of 24,000 MWh. The station is located in the northern corner of Bath County, Virginia, on the southeast side of the Eastern Continental Divide, which forms this section of the border between Virginia and West Virginia. The station consists of two reservoirs separated by about 1,260 feet (380 m) in elevation. It was the largest pumped-storage power station in the world until 2021, when it was surpassed by the Fengning Pumped Storage Power Station.

Construction on the power station, with an original capacity of 2,100 megawatts (2,800,000 hp), began in March 1977 and was completed in December 1985 at a cost of $1.6 billion, Voith-Siemens upgraded the six turbines between 2004 and 2009, increasing power generation to 500.5 MW and pumping power to 480 megawatts (640,000 hp) for each turbine. Bath County Station is jointly owned by Dominion Generation (60%) and FirstEnergy (40%), and managed by Dominion. It stores energy for PJM Interconnection, a regional transmission organization in 13 states and the District of Columbia.

== Design ==
The upper and lower reservoirs are created by earth and rock-filled embankment dams. The upper reservoir dam is 460 feet (140 m) high, 2,200 feet (670 m) long and has a structural volume of 18,000,000 cubic yards (14,000,000 m^{3}). The upper reservoir on Little Back Creek has a surface area of 265 acres (107 ha) and storage capacity of 35,599 acre-feet (43,911,000 m^{3}). The lower reservoir dam on Back Creek is 135 feet (41 m) high and 2,400 feet (730 m) in length. It has a structural volume of 4,000,000 cubic yards (3,100,000 m^{3}) and creates a reservoir with a surface area of 555 acres (225 ha) and storage capacity of 27,927 acre-feet (34,447,000 m^{3}). Connecting the upper reservoir to the power station are three water conduits between 3,100–3,600 feet (940–1,100 m) long. The conduits each lead to a 990 feet (300 m) shaft which bifurcates into two penstocks (for a total of six) before reaching the turbines. Each penstock is 18 feet (5.5 m) in diameter and between 900–1,260 feet (270–380 m) in length. Maximum static pressure from the top of the water delivery system to the turbines is 1,320 feet (400 m).

== Method of operation ==
Water is released from the upper reservoir during periods of high demand and is used to generate electricity. What makes this different from other hydroelectric dams is that during times of low demand, power is taken from coal, nuclear, and other power plants and is used to pump water from the lower to the upper reservoir. Although this plant uses more power than it generates, it allows these other plants to operate at close to peak efficiency for an overall cost savings. Back Creek and Little Back Creek, the water sources used to create the reservoirs, have a relatively small flow rate. However, since water is pumped between the reservoirs equally, the only water taken from these creeks now that the reservoirs are full is to replace the water lost to evaporation. During operation, the water level fluctuates by over 105 feet (30 m) in the upper reservoir and 60 feet (20 m) feet in the lower reservoir.

When generating power, the water flow can be as much as 13.5 million US gallons (51,000 m^{3}) per minute (850 m^{3}/s). When storing power, the flow can be as much as 12.7 million US gallons (48,000 m^{3}) per minute (800 m^{3}/s).

Reservoirs

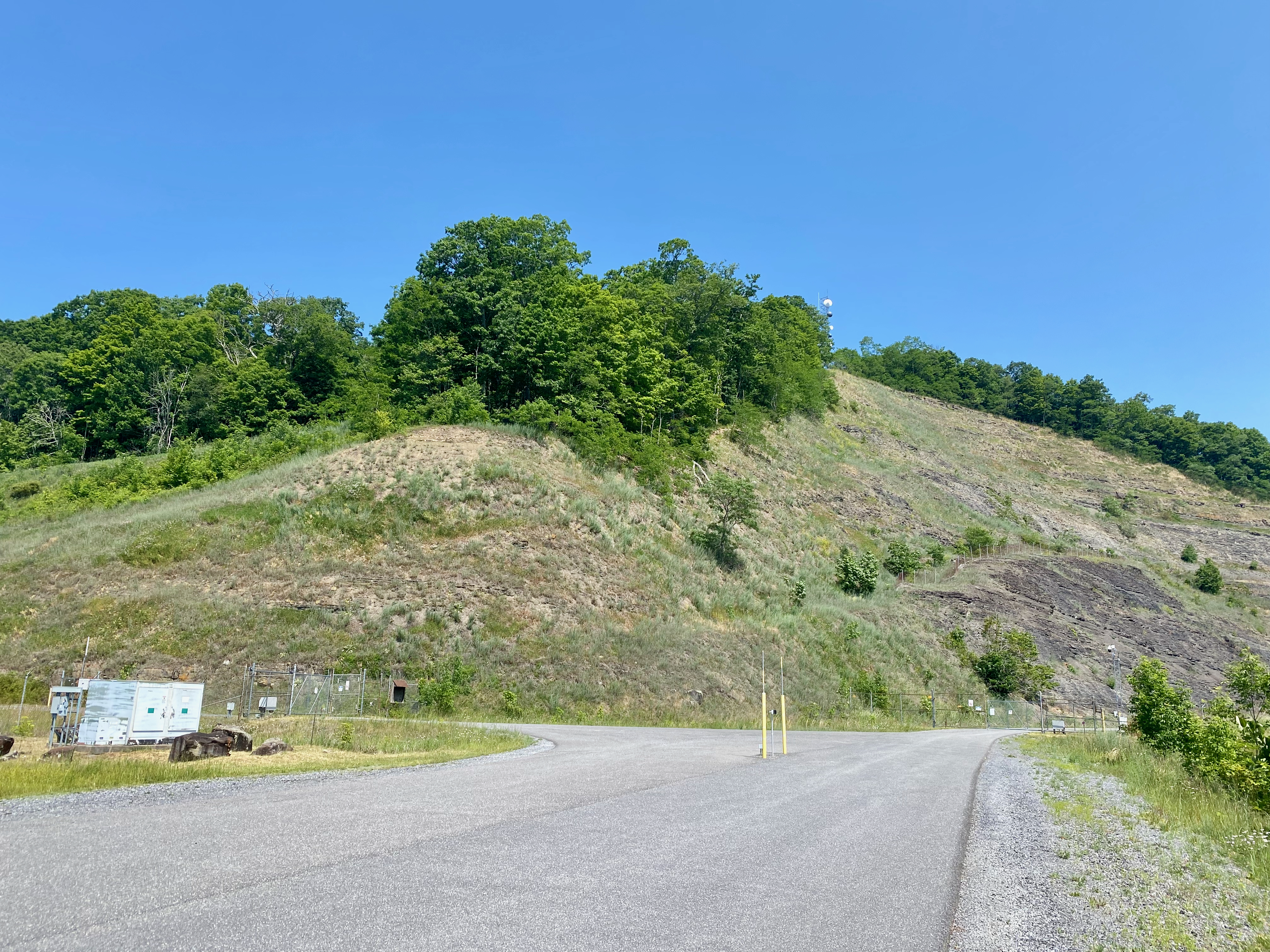
Upper reservoir directly behind the top of the mountain

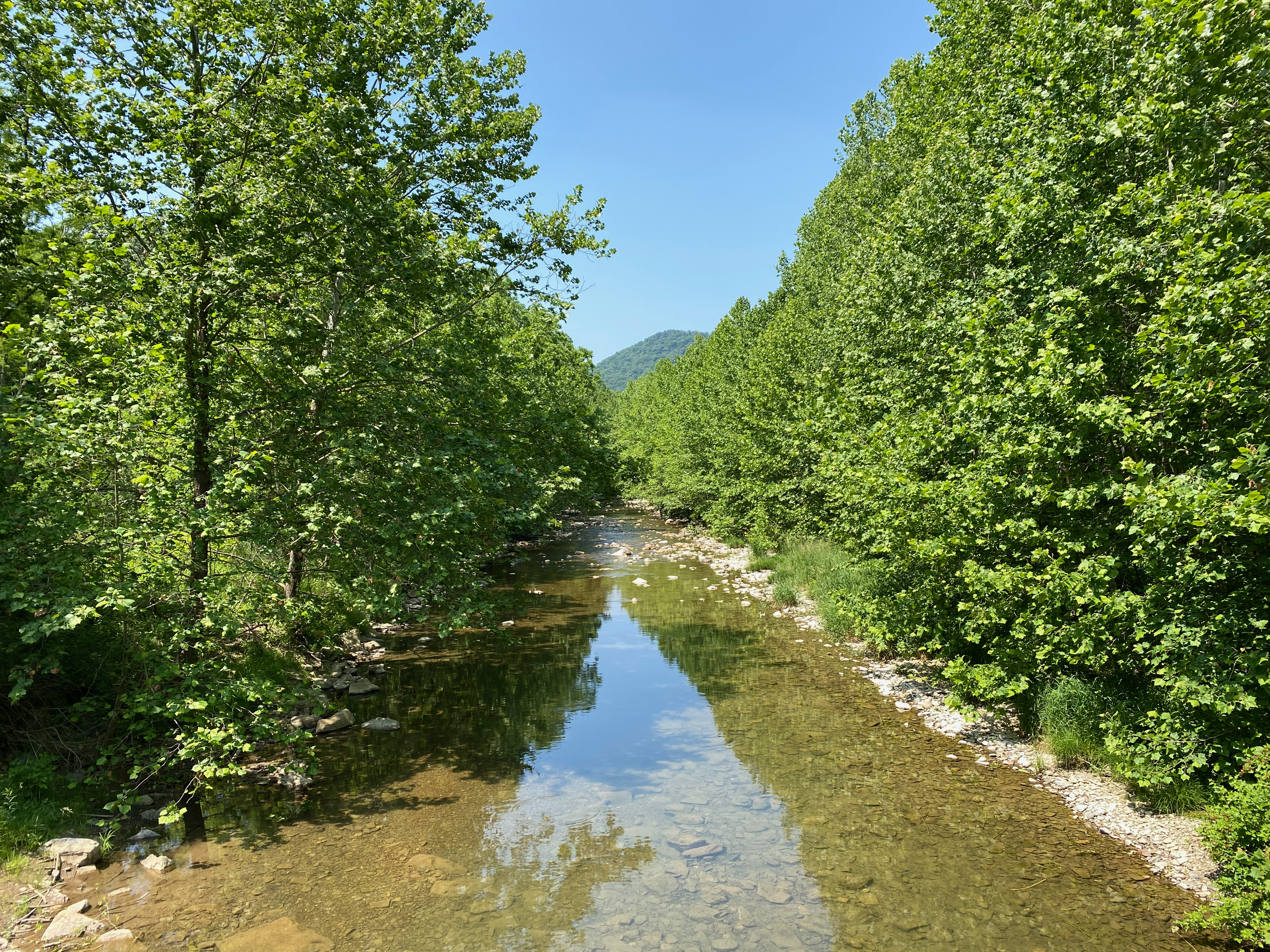
An inlet stream of the lower reservoir

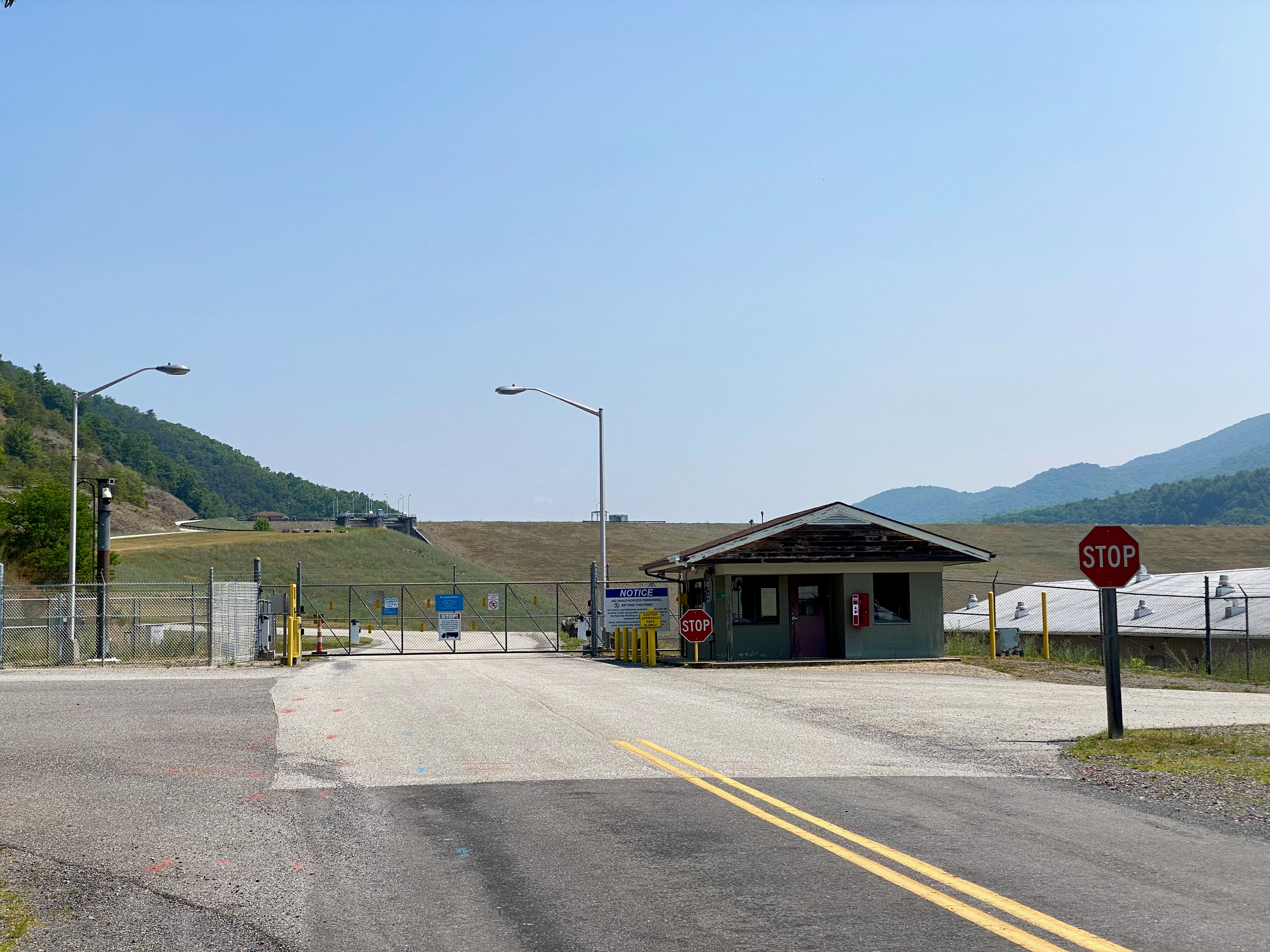
Lower reservoir dam and spillway

== Environment ==
A fishing habitat was created downstream of the facility. In times of drought water quality can be maintained by using nearby recreational reservoirs to supply extra water to the creeks. The creeks and recreational reservoirs have water quality sufficient for fish.

== See also ==
- List of energy storage projects
- Pumped-storage hydroelectricity
- List of largest hydroelectric power stations in the United States
