= Ludington Pumped Storage Power Plant =

Ludington Pumped Storage Plant
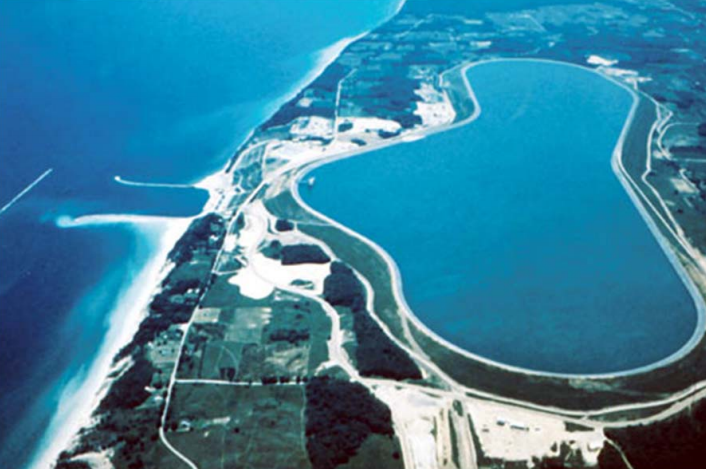

- Location within Michigan
- Country: United States
- Location: Pere Marquette Township, Michigan
- Coordinates: 43°53′37″N 86°26′43″W
- Purpose: Power
- Status: Operational
- Construction began: July 1968
- Opening date: 1973
- Construction cost: $327 million (1973)
- Owners: Consumers Energy (51%); Detroit Edison (49%)

Upper dam and spillways
- Type of dam: Embankment dam
- Height (foundation): 103 feet (31 m)
- Length: 6 miles (9.7 km)
- Width (crest): 21 feet (6.4 m)

Upper reservoir
- Total capacity: 82,860 acre-feet (102,210,000 m^{3})
- Active capacity: 52,171 acre-feet (64,352,000 m^{3})
- Inactive capacity: 30,689 acre-feet (37,854,000 m^{3})
- Surface area: 842 acres (341 ha)
- Maximum length: 2.5 miles (4.0 km)
- Maximum width: 1 mile (1.6 km)
- Maximum water depth: 110 feet (34 m)

Lower reservoir
- Creates: Lake Michigan
- Total capacity: 1,180 cubic miles (4,900 km^{3})
- Surface area: 22,404 square miles (58,030 km^{2})
- Maximum length: 307 miles (494 km)
- Maximum width: 118 miles (190 km)
- Normal elevation: 577 feet (176 m)

Power Station
- Coordinates: 43°53′37″N 86°26′43″W
- Commission date: 1973
- Type: Pumped-storage
- Hydraulic head: 363 feet (111 m)
- Pump-generators: 6 × 362 MW (455 MVA) Francis pump-turbines
- Installed capacity: 2,292 MW
- Overall efficiency: 70%
- Storage capacity: 9 hours (19,548 MWh)
- 2016 generation: -752 GW·h

The Ludington Pumped Storage Plant is a hydroelectric plant and reservoir in Pere Marquette Township near the city of Ludington, Michigan. It was built between 1969 and 1973 at a cost of $315 million and is owned jointly by Consumers Energy and DTE Energy and operated by Consumers Energy. At the time of its construction, it was the largest pumped storage hydroelectric facility in the world.

== Characteristics ==
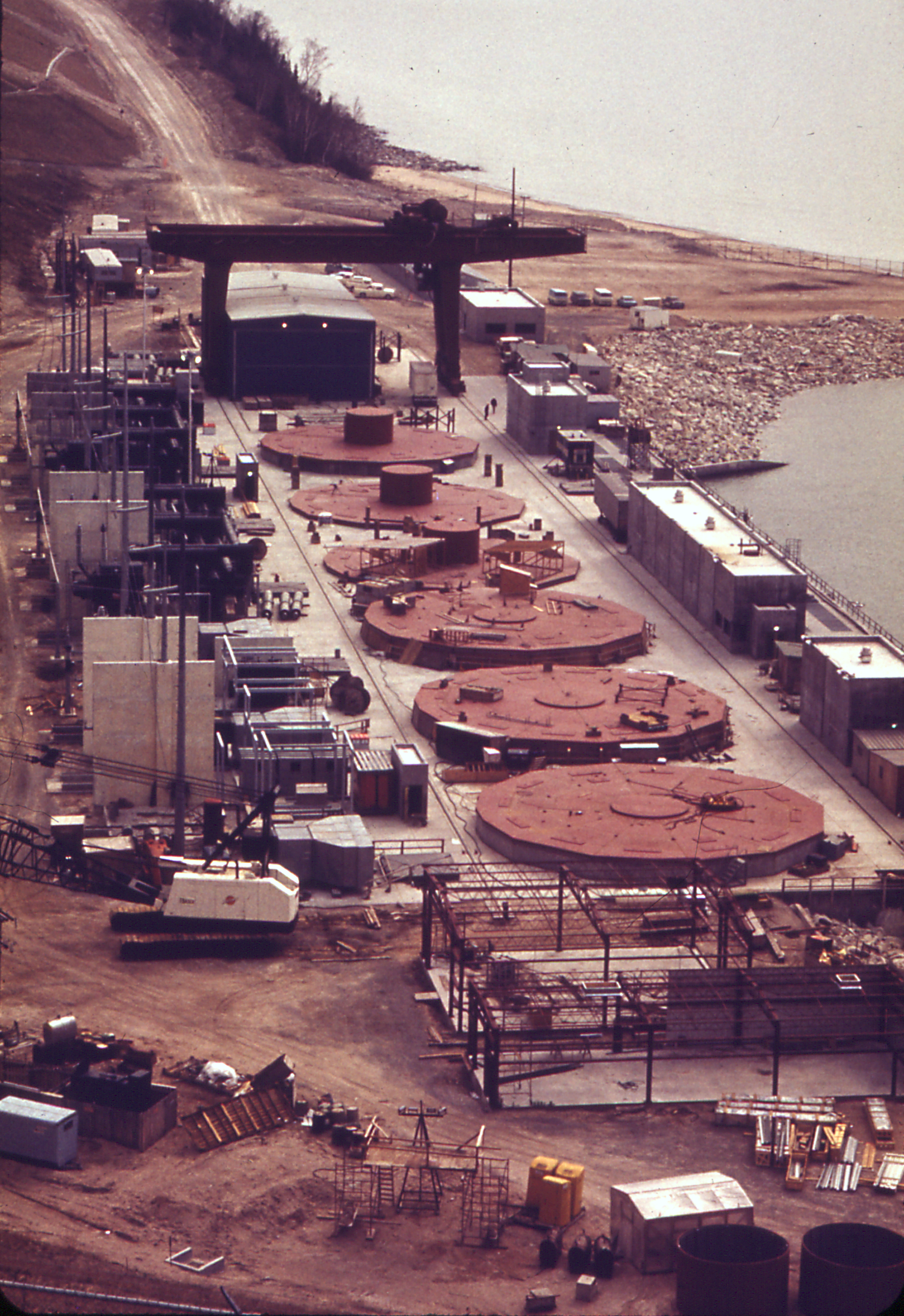
Detail of the turbines when first constructed.

It consists of a reservoir 119 feet (36 m) deep, 2.5 miles (4.0 km) long, and one mile (1.6 km) wide which holds 82,300 acre-feet (26.8 billion US gal; 102 million m^{3}) of water. The 1.3-square-mile (3.4 km^{2}) reservoir is located on the banks of Lake Michigan. Because impervious bedrock is more than 800 feet (240 m) below the reservoir, the builders had to line the reservoir with a layer of asphalt and clay to prevent water seeping into the ground.

The power plant consists of six reversible turbines for a total output of 2,292 megawatts. Water is delivered from the upper reservoir to the turbines by six penstocks each 1,100 feet (340 m) long that taper from 28 to 24 feet (8.5 to 7.3 m) in diameter.

At night, during low demand for electricity, the turbines run in reverse to pump water 363 feet (111 m) uphill from Lake Michigan into the reservoir. The plant takes advantage of the natural steep sand dune landform of eastern Lake Michigan. During periods of peak demand water is released to generate power. Electrical generation can begin within two minutes with peak electric output of 2,292 MW achieved in under 30 minutes. Maximum water flow is over 33 million US gallons (120,000 m^{3}) per minute.

This process was designed to level the load of nearby nuclear power plants on the grid. It also replaces the need to build natural gas peak power plants used only during high demand. The Ludington Pumped Storage plant is connected to six 345-kV Transmission lines, all owned and maintained by METC, a subsidiary of ITC Holdings.

The project was given the 1973 award for "Outstanding Civil Engineering Achievement" by the American Society of Civil Engineers.

== Upgrade ==
Consumers Energy discussed plans in 2008 to extend the life of the facility and upgrade the pumps to increase efficiency by up to 9%. Consumers Energy also planned to tap the wind power resources along the eastern Lake Michigan shore with wind farms. Because wind is an intermittent power source and may inconveniently deliver large amounts of power during periods of low electric demand, pumped storage facilities are desirable to have on the same grid with large-scale wind farms. The available pumped storage capacity, along with the wind characteristics, partly determine the maximum contribution wind power can make to the overall electricity use in a region.

Consumers Energy and Detroit Edison announced an $800 million upgrade on February 7, 2011. The six-year project would begin in 2013 and extend the plant's life by at least forty years and upgrade the generating capacity from 1,872 megawatts to 2,172 megawatts. Plans for the upgrade include replacing all six of the plant's turbines, which would increase the plant's total generating capacity by 15 percent, and efficiency by 5 percent. Upon completion, the plant will produce enough power for a community of 1.65 million (a quarter million increase). As of August 2020, five of the six turbines had been successfully replaced; the project was expected to be completed in May or June 2021. However claims of defective parts and timeline overruns led Consumers Power and Detroit Edison to sue the project contractor, Toshiba America in April 2022.

== See also ==
- List of energy storage projects
- List of pumped-storage hydroelectric power stations
- Robert Moses Niagara Power Plant, another large pumped-storage facility on the Great Lakes
- Bath County Pumped Storage Station, Virginia; the largest pumped storage facility in the world until 2021
