= Zi-Qiang Zhu =

British electrical engineering professor (born 1962)

- 诸自强
- Born: 23 September 1962 (age 64); Ningbo, Zhejiang, China
- Scientific career
- Fields: Electrical Engineering
- Workplaces: Zhejiang University; University of Sheffield

Zi-Qiang Zhu (Chinese: 诸自强; pinyin: Zhū Zìqiáng; born 23 September 1962), better known Z. Q. Zhu, is a Chinese-born British professor in electrical machines and control. He is the head of the Electrical Machines and Drives Research Group at the University of Sheffield in the UK, which is one of the largest research groups consisting of more than 100 personnel, specializing in permanent magnet brushless machines and drives for applications ranging from automotive, aerospace, renewable energy, to industrial and domestic products. The group also hosts the Rolls-Royce University Technology Centre on Advanced Electrical Machines and Drives and the Sheffield Siemens Wind Power Research Centre (S2WP). Zhu is academic director of S2WP and also director of the Welling Shanghai Research Centre.

== Early life ==
Zhu was born in Zhangshu, a village of Yuyao County (now part of Cixi), where he completed primary and secondary education at communal schools. He passed his gaokao in 1977.

== Education ==
He received BEng and MSc degrees in electrical and electronic engineering from Zhejiang University, in 1981 and 1984, respectively, and a PhD degree in electrical and electronic engineering from the University of Sheffield, in 1991. From 1984 to 1988, he was a lecturer with the Department of Electrical Engineering of Zhejiang University. Since 1988, he has been with the University of Sheffield, where he was initially a research associate and then subsequently appointed to an established post as senior research officer/senior research scientist. Since 2000, he has been a professor of electrical machines and control systems with the Department of Electronic and Electrical Engineering, University of Sheffield. In 2016 he became a Fellow of the Royal Academy of Engineering.

== Research ==
His research experience includes design and analysis of brushless PM, switched reluctance, induction motors, actuators, and drives; vector, direct torque, sensorless and intelligent controls; as well as noise and vibration. On these topics, he has published more than 900 journal and conference papers, including more than 300 IEEE Transactions and IET Proceedings papers. His current major research interests include design and control of permanent magnet brushless motors and drives, for applications ranging from automotive to renewable energy.

== Awards and honors ==
- 2021 - IEEE Nikola Tesla Award
- 2024 - Global Energy Prize
