= Nicola Bianchi =

Italian engineering professor

Nicola Bianchi is a professor of engineering at the University of Padova, Italy.

== Awards ==
He was named Fellow of the Institute of Electrical and Electronics Engineers (IEEE) in 2014, "for contributions to the theory and practice of electric machine design and control".

Bianchi also received the 2026 IEEE Nikola Tesla Award "for contributions to the analysis, design, and application of synchronous permanent magnet and reluctance machines".
