= Muddy Run Pumped Storage Facility =

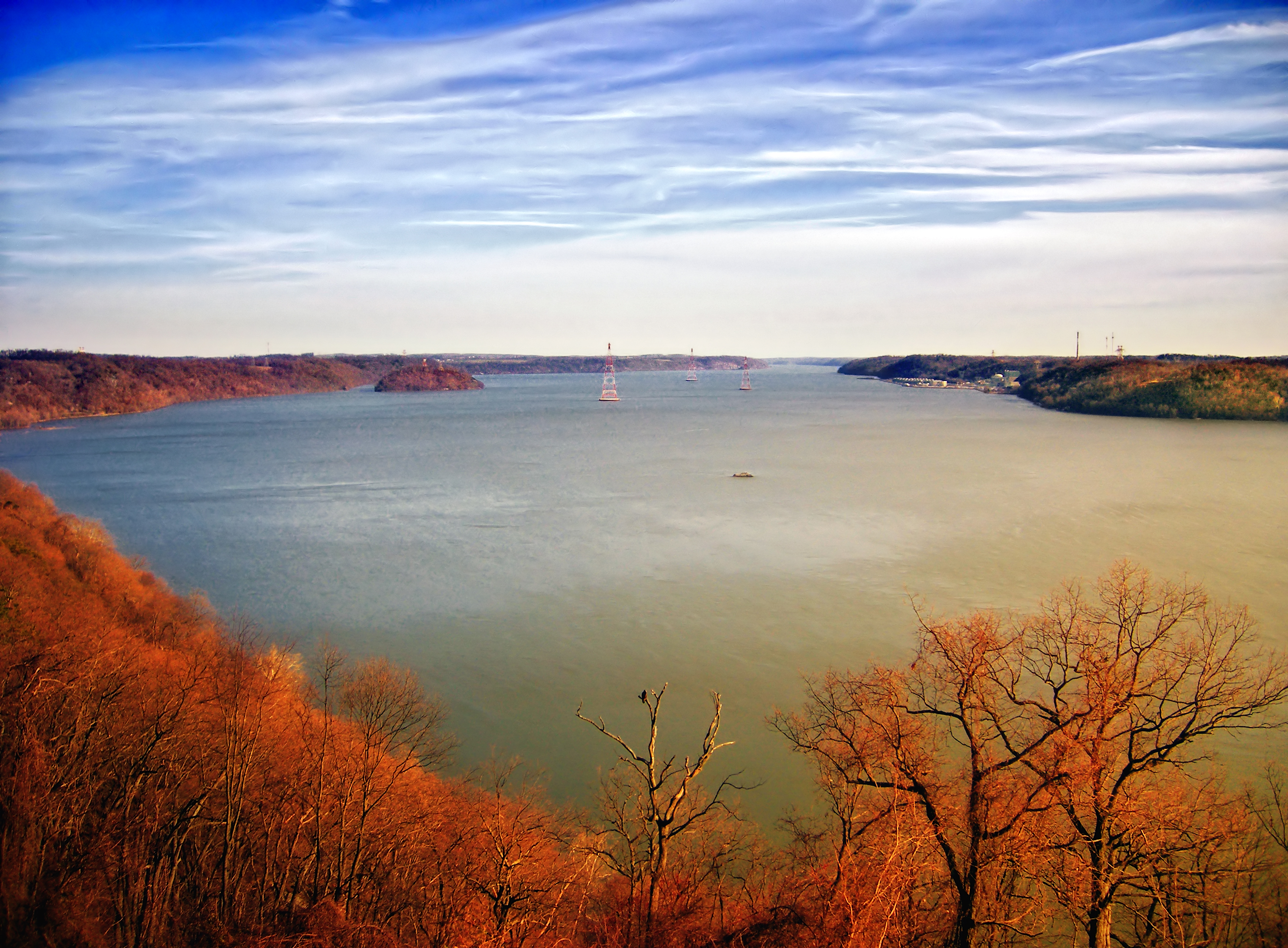
- Country: United States
- Coordinates: 39.847024°N 76.291462°W
- Status: Operational
- Construction began: 1964
- Opening date: 1968
- Construction cost: $73 million (1968)
- Operator(s): Constellation Energy

Upper reservoir
- Creates: Muddy Run Reservoir
- Total capacity: 11 billion U.S. gallons (41.57 GL, 33,700 acre-feet, 1000 acres)

Lower reservoir
- Creates: Conowingo Pond
- Total capacity: 1 trillion U.S. gallons (3790 GL, 310,000 acre-feet, 9000 acres)

Power Station
- Hydraulic head: 410 ft (120 m)
- Pump-generators: 8 × 134 MW reversible Francis type
- Installed capacity: 1072 MW
- Annual generation: -361 GW·h (2016)
- Website; Muddy Run Pumped Storage Facility

Muddy Run Pumped Storage Facility is a pumped-storage hydroelectric generation facility in Drumore Township, Pennsylvania, United States. Constructed by the Philadelphia Electric Company and completed in 1968, Muddy Run was the largest pumped-storage facility in the world. Muddy Run has a capacity of 1,071 megawatts. The facility is operated by the Susquehanna Electric Company, a subsidiary of Constellation Energy.

The facility's upper reservoir is the 1,000-acre (400 ha) Muddy Run Reservoir, with a full pool elevation of over 500 feet (150 m), and a usable storage capacity of 1,466 million cubic feet (33,700 acre⋅ft; 41.5 hm^{3}). Muddy Run Reservoir was created by damming Muddy Run with a 4,800 feet (1,500 m) long, 250 feet (76 m) high, rock-filled dam. The lower reservoir is the Conowingo Reservoir, created in the Susquehanna River by the Conowingo Dam, with a normal pool elevation of 109 feet (33 m). The power house uses excess grid capacity during off peak hours to pump water from the Conowingo Reservoir into the upper reservoir through four 25-foot (7.6 m) diameter, 343-foot (105 m) vertical shafts. During peak power demand periods, the water is allowed to flow back from the lake through the shafts to the eight turbines causing the pumps to act as generators.

The Muddy Run electrical machinery was designed by the noted engineer Eugene C. Whitney of Westinghouse Electric Company, who designed the machinery for the Grand Coulee Dam #3 powerhouse. Whitney "was present when the machines were first to be started. The operator was reluctant to take the first step. Gene said, 'Call your boss.' The boss said, 'If Gene says to start the machines, start them.' So they did, and water rose from the lower Susquehanna River to the upper reservoir, 400 feet above".

The upper reservoir extends into Martic Township. The area around the upper reservoir is operated as a park, complementing the nearby Susquehannock State Park. Susquehannock State Park has an overlook trail with a good view of the Muddy Run facility.
