= Syed Abu Nasar =

Syed Abu Nasar (December 25, 1932 – January 29, 2012) was a James R. Boyd Professor of Electrical Engineering (Emeritus) at the University of Kentucky. He was born in India and got his doctorate in electrical engineering at the University of California, Berkeley in 1963 . His research concerned electric motors. He served as the chair of the Electrical Engineering department at the University of Kentucky from 1989 to 1997. He was a Life Fellow of the IEEE and the recipient of the 2000 IEEE Nikola Tesla Award.
