= Fengning Pumped Storage Power Station =

- Location within China
- Country: China
- Location: Fengning Manchu Autonomous County, Hebei Province
- Coordinates: 41°39′58.35″N 116°31′43.63″E
- Status: Operational
- Construction began: 2013
- Opening date: 2019-2024
- Construction cost: CNY 19.24 billion ($2.6 billion)

Upper reservoir
- Creates: Fengning Upper
- Total capacity: 45,000,000 m^{3} (36,000 acre⋅ft)

Lower reservoir
- Creates: Fengning Lower
- Total capacity: 71,560,000 m^{3} (58,010 acre⋅ft)

Power Station
- Hydraulic head: 425 m
- Pump-generators: Francis pump turbines Phase 1: 6 x 300 MW; Phase 2: 6 x 300 MW
- Installed capacity: 3,600 MW
- Storage capacity: 40 GWh
- Annual generation: 3.42 TWh

The Fengning Pumped Storage Power Station (Chinese: 丰宁抽水蓄能电站) is a pumped-storage hydroelectric power station about 145 km (90 mi) northwest of Chengde in Fengning Manchu Autonomous County of Hebei Province, China. Construction on the power station began in June 2013 and the first generator was commissioned in 2019, the last in 2021. Project cost was US$1.87 billion. On 1 April 2014 Gezhouba Group was awarded the main contract to build the power station. It was constructed in two 1,800 MW phases. Main construction was completed in late 2021, and became the largest pumped-storage power station in the world with an installed capacity of 3,600 MW. The 12th and final turbine began commercial operations in August 2024.

The lower reservoir holds up to 66,150,000 m^{3} (53,630 acre⋅ft) of water of which 41,480,000 m^{3} (33,630 acre⋅ft) can be used for power generation. The upper reservoir withholds up to 48,830,000 m^{3} (39,590 acre⋅ft) of water of which 40,610,000 m^{3} (32,920 acre⋅ft) can be used for power generation. Water from the upper reservoir is sent to the underground power station down near the lower reservoir. The facility is designed to consume 8.71 TWh of electricity for pumping, and then generate 6.61 TWh, annually.

== See also ==
- List of pumped-storage power stations
