= Aldo Boglietti =

Italian electrical engineer

Aldo Boglietti (born 1957 in Rome) is an Italian electrical engineer. He is alumni of the Polytechnic University of Turin in Turin, Italy. He was named Fellow of the Institute of Electrical and Electronics Engineers (IEEE) in 2012 "for contributions to analysis of magnetic materials and AC electrical machines." He has been the recipient of the IEEE NIKOLA TESLA AWARD 2024 “For contributions to the magnetic and thermal modeling, design, and characterization of electrical machines.”
