= Raccoon Mountain Pumped-Storage Plant =

Hydroelectric power station in Tennessee, US

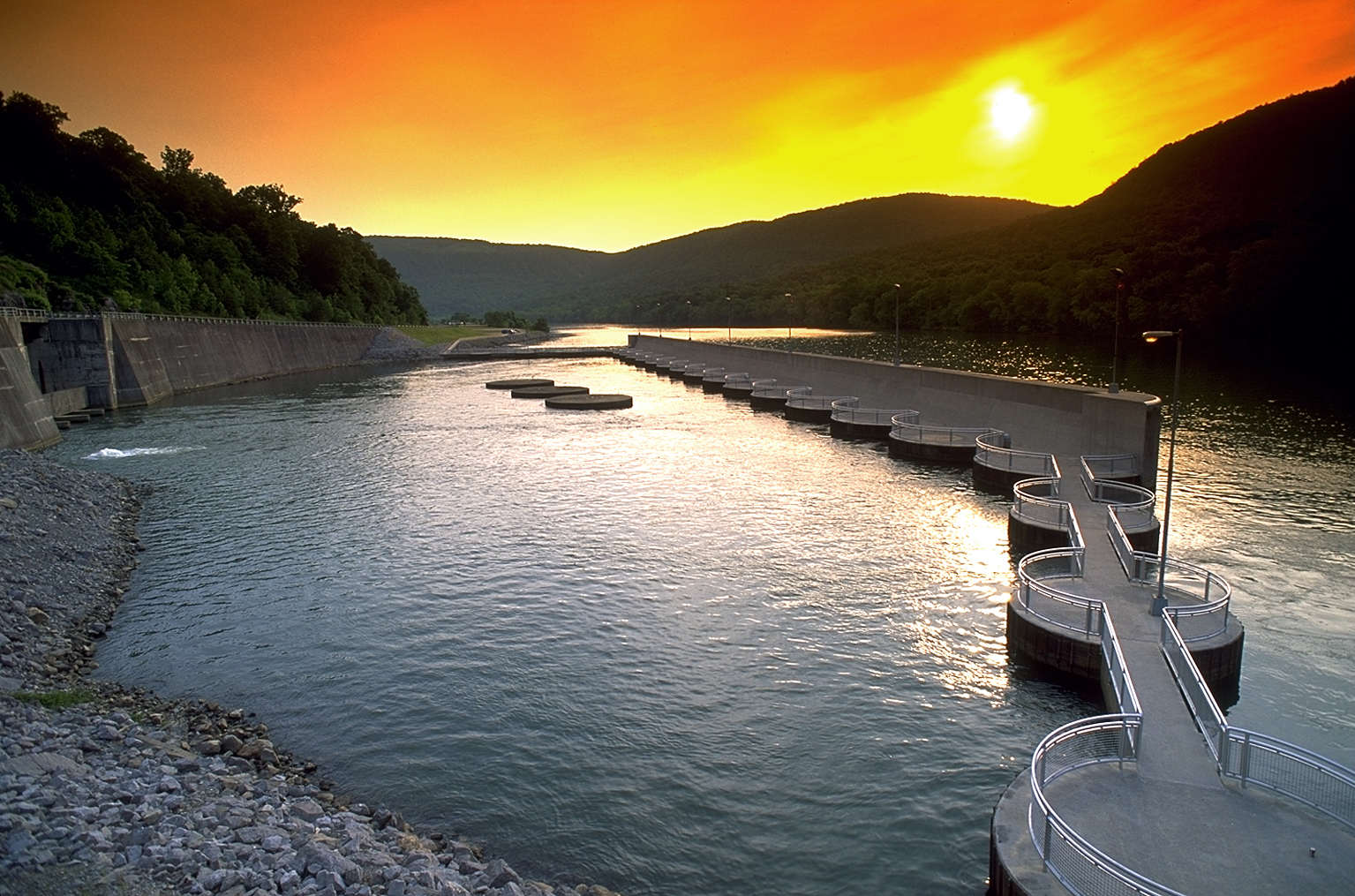
- Tailrace (TN River) of RMPS (TVA photo)

- Location within Tennessee
- Country: United States
- Location: Marion County, Tennessee
- Coordinates: 35°2′54″N 85°23′48″W
- Purpose: Power
- Status: Operational
- Construction began: July 1970
- Opening date: 1978
- Construction cost: $310 million (1978)
- Owner: Tennessee Valley Authority
- Operator: Tennessee Valley Authority

Upper dam and spillways
- Type of dam: Embankment dam
- Height (foundation): 230 feet (70 m)
- Length: 8,500 feet (2,600 m)
- Dam volume: 10,000,000 cubic yards (7,600,000 m^{3})

Upper reservoir
- Total capacity: 107,000,000,000 US gallons (4.1×10^{11} L; 8.9×10^{10} imp gal)
- Surface area: 528 acres (214 ha)
- Maximum water depth: 222 feet (68 m)
- Normal elevation: 1,672 feet (510 m)

Lower dam and spillways
- Type of dam: Gravity dam
- Impounds: Tennessee River
- Height (foundation): 81 feet (25 m)
- Length: 3,767 feet (1,148 m)
- Elevation at crest: 635.0 feet (193.5 m)
- Spillways: 10
- Spillway type: Radial gate

Lower reservoir
- Creates: Nickajack Lake
- Total capacity: 252,297 acre-feet (311,204,000 m^{3})
- Active capacity: 32,132 acre-feet (39,634,000 m^{3})
- Catchment area: 21,870 square miles (56,600 km^{2})
- Surface area: 10,370 acres (4,200 ha)
- Maximum water depth: 145 feet (44 m)
- Normal elevation: 633.5 feet (193.1 m)

Power Station
- Operator: Tennessee Valley Authority
- Commission date: 1978
- Type: Pumped-storage
- Hydraulic head: 1,040 feet (320 m)
- Pump-generators: 4 × 413 MW
- Installed capacity: 1652 MW
- Capacity factor: 20%
- Storage capacity: 22 hours
- 2017 generation: -686 GW·h
- Website; Raccoon Mountain

Raccoon Mountain Pumped-Storage Plant is a pumped-storage hydroelectric underground power station in Marion County, just west of Chattanooga in the U.S. state of Tennessee. Owned and operated by the Tennessee Valley Authority (TVA), the plant can generate a maximum of 1,652 megawatts of electricity. The reservoir at the top of the mountain covers 528 acres (214 ha), with a dam that is 230 feet (70 m) high and 5,800 feet (1,800 m) long, the largest rock-fill dam ever built by TVA. With a hydraulic head of roughly 1000 feet high, the dam can apply a maximum force of approximately 450 pounds per square inch of water pressure to the Turbine. The plant serves as an important element for peak power generation and grid balancing in the TVA system.

Construction was started in 1970 and was completed in 1978. The plant was idled in March 2012 due to cracks in the generators' rotors. The plant came entirely back on line in April 2014.

Diagram of the facility

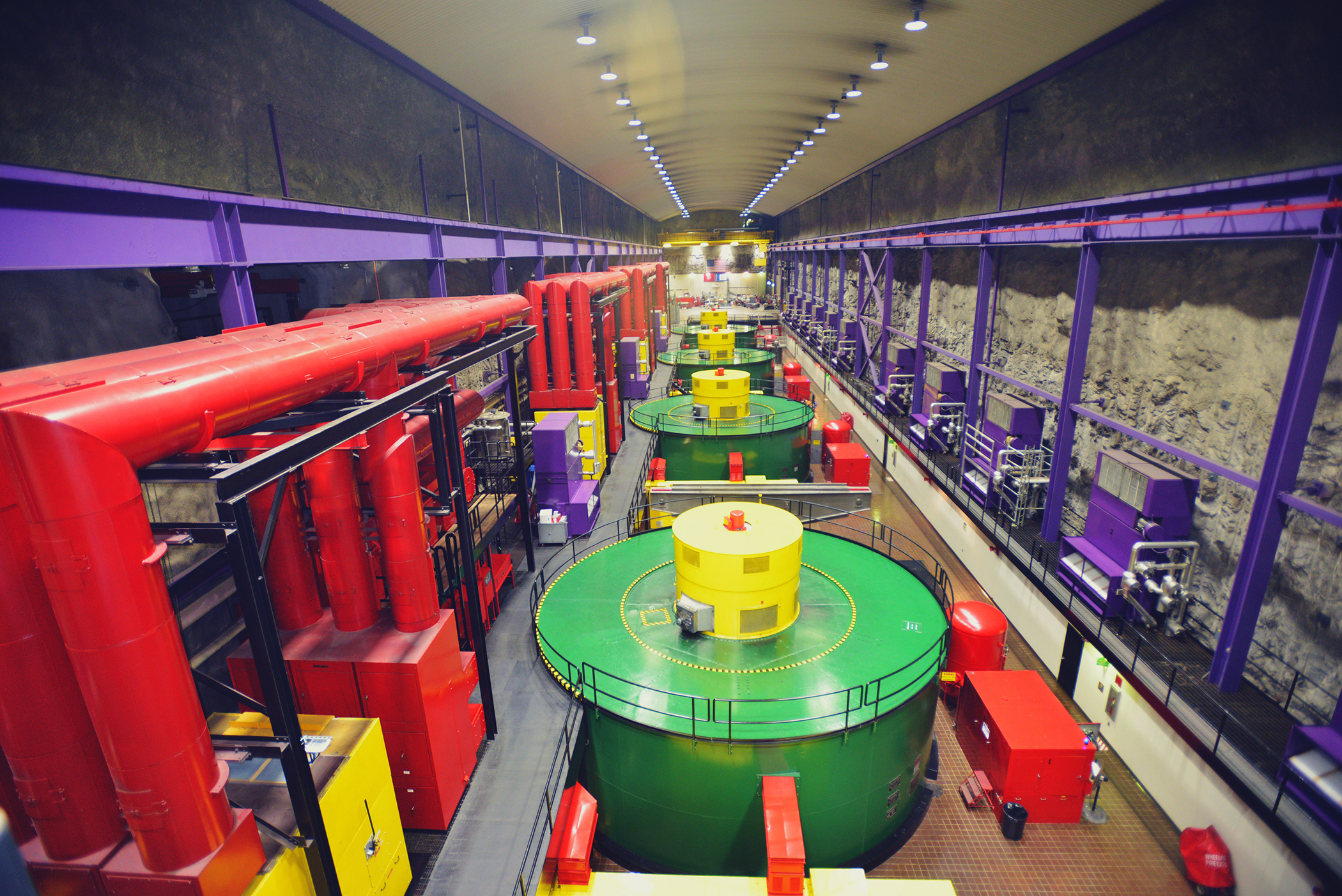
The underground powerhouse

== Operation ==
During periods of high electric demand, water flows from reservoir into a tunnel drilled through the center of the mountain, driving electric generators in the underground powerhouse. During periods of low demand and excess generation, the generators run in reverse and pump water from Nickajack Lake back up to the top of the mountain, where it is stored until needed later. This process repeats continuously, serving as peak power generation. The plant has a maximum power output of 1,652 megawatts (2,215,000 hp) and can generate power for up to 22 hours.

== Recreation ==
The TVA operates a visitor center, open year-round, that offers exhibits on the history of the generating facility as well as the TVA’s operations. The center also offers views of the Tennessee River gorge and surrounding mountains.

Raccoon Mountain is used for hiking, walking, running, and road and mountain biking. It hosts a marathon, half marathon, double half marathon, relay, 5K and 10K race each year.
