= Pumped-storage hydroelectricity =

Electric energy storage system

A diagram of the TVA pumped storage facility at Raccoon Mountain Pumped-Storage Plant in Tennessee, United States

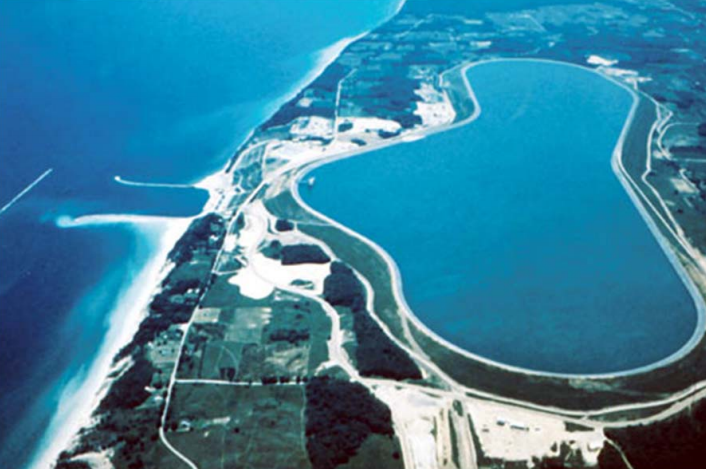
Ludington Pumped Storage Power Plant in Michigan on Lake Michigan

Pumped-storage hydroelectricity (PSH), or pumped hydroelectric energy storage (PHES), is a type of hydroelectric energy storage used by electric power systems for load balancing. A PSH system stores energy in the form of gravitational potential energy of water, pumped from a lower elevation reservoir to a higher elevation. Low-cost surplus off-peak electric power is typically used to run the pumps. During periods of high electrical demand, the stored water is released through turbines to produce electric power.

Pumped-storage hydroelectricity allows energy from intermittent sources (such as solar, wind, and other renewables) or excess electricity from continuous base-load sources (such as coal or nuclear) to be saved for periods of higher demand. The reservoirs used with pumped storage can be quite small, when contrasted with the lakes of conventional hydroelectric plants of similar power capacity, and generating periods are often less than half a day.

The round-trip efficiency of PSH varies between 70% and 80%. Although the losses of the pumping process make the plant a net consumer of energy overall, the system increases revenue by selling more electricity during periods of peak demand, when electricity prices are highest. If the upper lake collects significant rainfall, or is fed by a river, then the plant may be a net energy producer in the manner of a traditional hydroelectric plant.

Pumped storage is by far the largest-capacity form of grid energy storage available, and, as of 2020, accounted for around 95% of all active storage installations worldwide, with a total installed throughput capacity of over 181 GW and as of 2020 a total installed storage capacity of over 1.6 TWh.

As of 2025, according to International Hydropower Association, worldwide PSH provides 200 GW power and 9000 GWh energy storage, while the Battery energy storage system market is catching up very fast in terms of power generation capacity. As of May 2025, China’s cumulative BESS installations are reported at 106.9 GW and 240.3 GWh.

== Basic principle ==
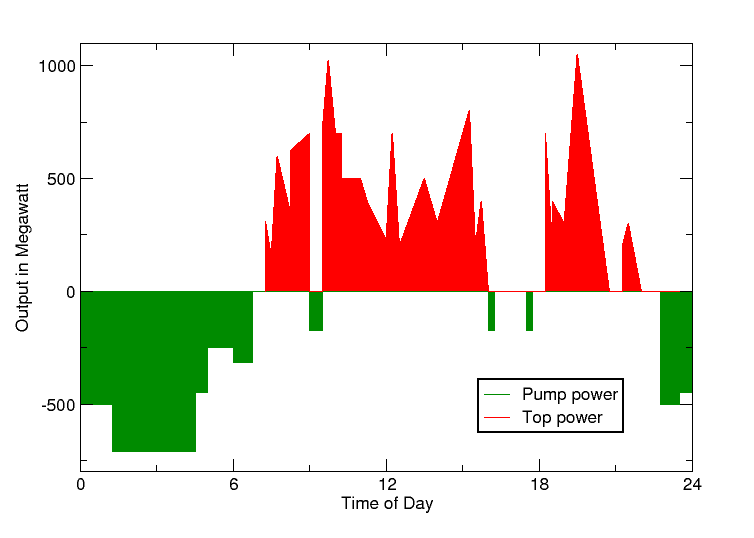
Power distribution, over a day, of a pumped-storage hydroelectricity facility. Green represents power consumed in pumping. Red is power generated.

Energy from a source such as sunlight is used to lift water upward against the force of gravity, giving it potential energy. The stored potential energy is later converted to electricity that is added to the power grid, even when the original energy source is not available.

A pumped-storage hydroelectricity generally consists of two water reservoirs at different heights, connected with each other. At times of low electrical demand, excess generation capacity is used to pump water into the upper reservoir. When there is higher demand, water is released back into the lower reservoir through a turbine, generating electricity. Pumped storage plants usually use reversible turbine/generator assemblies, which can act both as a pump and as a turbine generator (usually Francis turbine designs). Variable speed operation further optimizes the round trip efficiency in pumped hydro storage plants. In micro-PSH applications, a group of pumps and Pump As Turbine (PAT) could be implemented respectively for pumping and generating phases. The same pump could be used in both modes by changing rotational direction and speed: the operation point in pumping usually differs from the operation point in PAT mode.

== Types ==
In closed-loop systems, pure pumped-storage plants store water in an upper reservoir with no natural inflows, while pump-back plants utilize a combination of pumped storage and conventional hydroelectric plants with an upper reservoir that is replenished in part by natural inflows from a stream or river. Plants that do not use pumped storage are referred to as conventional hydroelectric plants; conventional hydroelectric plants that have significant storage capacity may be able to play a similar role in the electrical grid as pumped storage if appropriately equipped.

== Economic efficiency ==
Taking into account conversion losses and evaporation losses from the exposed water surface, energy recovery of 70–80% or more can be achieved. This technique is currently the most cost-effective means of storing large amounts of electrical energy, but capital costs and the necessity of appropriate geography are critical decision factors in selecting pumped-storage plant sites.

The relatively low energy density of pumped storage systems requires either large flows and/or large differences in height between reservoirs. The only way to store a significant amount of energy is by having a large body of water located relatively near, but as high as possible above, a second body of water. In some places this occurs naturally, in others one or both bodies of water were man-made. Projects in which both reservoirs are artificial and in which no natural inflows are involved with either reservoir are referred to as "closed loop" systems.

These systems may be economical because they flatten out load variations on the power grid, permitting thermal power stations such as coal-fired plants and nuclear power plants that provide base-load electricity to continue operating at peak efficiency, while reducing the need for "peaking" power plants that use the same fuels as many base-load thermal plants, gas and oil, but have been designed for flexibility rather than maximal efficiency. Hence pumped storage systems are crucial when coordinating large groups of heterogeneous generators. Capital costs for pumped-storage plants are relatively high, although this is somewhat mitigated by their proven long service life of decades - and in some cases over a century, which is three to five times longer than utility-scale batteries. When electricity prices become negative, pumped hydro operators may earn twice - when "buying" the electricity to pump the water to the upper reservoir at negative spot prices and again when selling the electricity at a later time when prices are high.

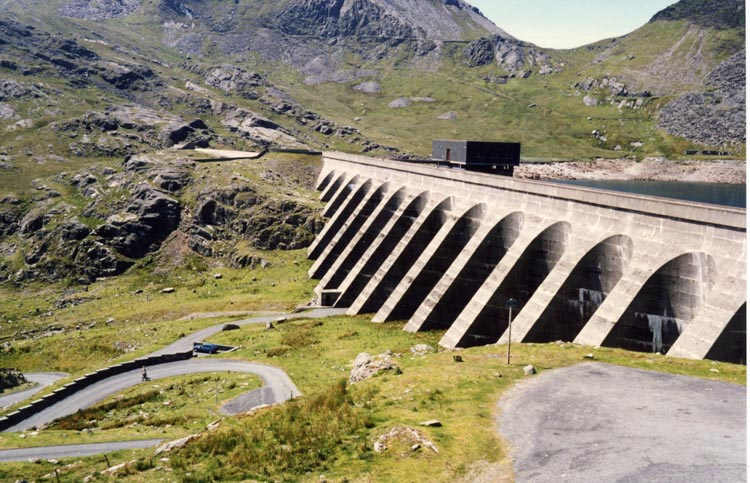
The upper reservoir, Llyn Stwlan, and dam of the Ffestiniog Pumped Storage Scheme in North Wales. The lower power station has four water turbines which generate 360 MW of electricity within 60 seconds of the need arising.

Along with energy management, pumped storage systems help stabilize electrical network frequency and provide reserve generation. Thermal plants are much less able to respond to sudden changes in electrical demand that potentially cause frequency and voltage instability. Pumped storage plants, like other hydroelectric plants, can respond to load changes within seconds.

Pumped-storage plants can therefore contribute ancillary services such as frequency regulation, spinning reserve, load following, and operating reserve, in addition to bulk energy storage and peak-shaving functions. This operational flexibility has become increasingly important in power systems with larger shares of variable renewable generation.

The most important use for pumped storage has traditionally been to balance baseload powerplants, but they may also be used to abate the fluctuating output of intermittent energy sources. Pumped storage provides a load at times of high electricity output and low electricity demand, enabling additional system peak capacity. In certain jurisdictions, electricity prices may be close to zero or occasionally negative on occasions that there is more electrical generation available than there is load available to absorb it. Although at present this is rarely due to wind or solar power alone, increased use of such generation will increase the likelihood of those occurrences.

It is particularly likely that pumped storage will become especially important as a balance for very large-scale photovoltaic and wind generation. Increased long-distance transmission capacity combined with significant amounts of energy storage will be a crucial part of regulating any large-scale deployment of intermittent renewable power sources. The high non-firm renewable electricity penetration in some regions supplies 40% of annual output, but 60% may be reached before additional storage is necessary.

=== Small-scale facilities ===
Smaller pumped storage plants cannot achieve the same economies of scale as larger ones, but some do exist, including a recent 13 MW project in Germany. Shell Energy has proposed a 5 MW project in Washington State. In 2016, proposals were made for small pumped storage plants in buildings, although these are not economical. Also, it is difficult to fit large reservoirs into the urban landscape (and the fluctuating water level may make them unsuitable for recreational use). Nevertheless, some authors defend the technological simplicity and security of water supply as important externalities.

== Location requirements ==
The main requirement for PSH is hilly country. The global greenfield pumped hydro atlas lists more than 800,000 potential sites around the world with combined storage of 86 million GWh (equivalent to the effective storage in about 2 trillion electric vehicle batteries), which is about 100 times more than needed to support 100% renewable electricity. Most are closed-loop systems away from rivers. Areas of natural beauty and new dams on rivers can be avoided because of the very large number of potential sites. Some projects utilise existing reservoirs (dubbed "bluefield") such as the 350 Gigawatt-hour Snowy 2.0 scheme under construction in Australia. Some recently proposed projects propose to take advantage of "brownfield" locations such as disused mines such as the Kidston project under construction in Australia.

== Environmental impact ==
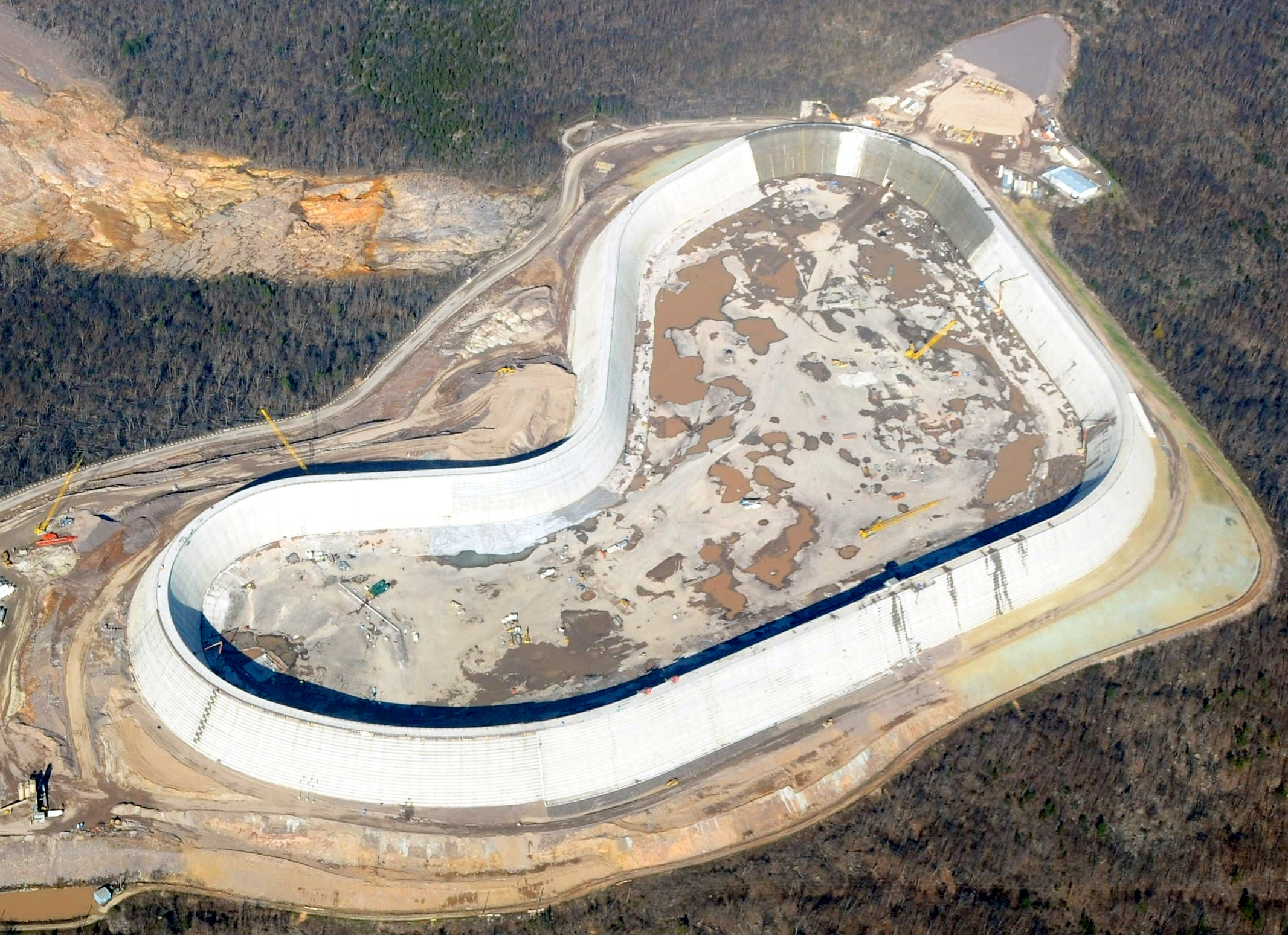
Taum Sauk Hydroelectric Power Station under construction

Water requirements for PSH are small: about 1 gigalitre of initial fill water per gigawatt-hour of storage. This water is recycled uphill and back downhill between the two reservoirs for many decades, but evaporation losses (beyond what rainfall and any inflow from local waterways provide) must be replaced. Land requirements are also small: about 10 hectares per gigawatt-hour of storage, which is much smaller than the land occupied by the solar and windfarms that the storage might support. Closed loop (off-river) pumped hydro storage has the smallest carbon emissions per unit of storage of all candidates for large-scale energy storage.

== Potential technologies ==
=== Seawater ===
Pumped storage plants can operate with seawater, although there are additional challenges compared to using fresh water, such as saltwater corrosion and barnacle growth. Inaugurated in 1966, the 240 MW Rance tidal power station in France can partially work as a pumped-storage station. When high tides occur at off-peak hours, the turbines can be used to pump more seawater into the reservoir than the high tide would have naturally brought in. It is the only large-scale power plant of its kind.

In 1999, the 30 MW Yanbaru project in Okinawa was the first demonstration of seawater pumped storage. It has since been decommissioned. A 300 MW seawater-based Lanai Pumped Storage Project was considered for Lanai, Hawaii, and seawater-based projects have been proposed in Ireland. A pair of proposed projects in the Atacama Desert in northern Chile would use 600 MW of photovoltaic solar (Skies of Tarapacá) together with 300 MW of pumped storage (Mirror of Tarapacá) lifting seawater 600 metres (2,000 ft) up a coastal cliff.

=== Freshwater coastal reservoirs ===
Freshwater from the river floods is stored in the sea area replacing seawater by constructing coastal reservoirs. The stored river water is pumped to uplands by constructing a series of embankment canals and pumped storage hydroelectric stations for the purpose of energy storage, irrigation, industrial, municipal, rejuvenation of overexploited rivers, etc. These multipurpose coastal reservoir projects offer massive pumped-storage hydroelectric potential to utilize variable and intermittent solar and wind power that are carbon-neutral, clean, and renewable energy sources.

=== Underground reservoirs ===
The use of underground reservoirs has been investigated. Examples include the Summit project in Norton, Ohio, the Maysville project in Kentucky (underground limestone mine), and the Mount Hope project in New Jersey, which was to have used a former iron mine as the lower reservoir. In 2018 energy storage was proposed at the Callio site in Pyhäjärvi (Finland), which would utilize the deepest base metal mine in Europe, with 1,450 metres (4,760 ft) elevation difference. Cost-per-kilowatt estimates for these projects can be lower than for surface projects if they use existing underground mine space. There are limited opportunities involving suitable underground space, but the number of underground pumped storage opportunities may increase if abandoned coal mines prove suitable. The United States has a half million abandoned coal mines, of which some could be re-used for pumped hydro.

As of 2022 US-based start-up Quidnet Energy is exploring using abandoned oil and gas wells for pumped storage. If successful they hope to scale up, utilizing some of the 3 million abandoned wells in the United States.

Using hydraulic fracturing, pressure can be stored underground in impermeable strata such as shale. The shale used contains no hydrocarbons.

In Bendigo, Victoria, Australia, the Bendigo Sustainability Group has proposed the use of the old gold mines under Bendigo for Pumped Hydro Energy Storage. Bendigo has the greatest concentration of deep shaft hard rock mines anywhere in the world with over 5,000 shafts sunk under Bendigo in the second half of the 19th Century. The deepest shaft extends 1,406 metres vertically underground. A recent pre-feasibility study has shown the concept to be viable with a generation capacity of 30 MW and a run time of 6 hours using a water head of over 750 metres.

=== Decentralised systems ===
Small (or micro) applications for pumped storage could be built on streams and within infrastructures, such as drinking water networks and artificial snow-making infrastructures. In this regard, a storm-water basin has been concretely implemented as a cost-effective solution for a water reservoir in a micro-pumped hydro energy storage. Such plants provide distributed energy storage and distributed flexible electricity production and can contribute to the decentralized integration of intermittent renewable energy technologies, such as wind power and solar power. Reservoirs that can be used for small pumped-storage hydropower plants could include natural or artificial lakes, reservoirs within other structures such as irrigation, or unused portions of mines or underground military installations. In Switzerland one study suggested that the total installed capacity of small pumped-storage hydropower plants in 2011 could be increased by 3 to 9 times by providing adequate policy instruments.

Using a pumped-storage system of cisterns and small generators, pico hydro may also be effective for "closed loop" home energy generation systems.

=== Underwater reservoirs ===
In March 2017, the research project StEnSea (Storing Energy at Sea) announced their successful completion of a four-week test of a pumped storage underwater reservoir. In this configuration, a hollow sphere submerged and anchored at great depth acts as the lower reservoir, while the upper reservoir is the enclosing body of water. Electricity is created when water is let in via a reversible turbine integrated into the sphere. During off-peak hours, the turbine changes direction and pumps the water out again, using "surplus" electricity from the grid.

The quantity of power created when water is let in, grows proportionally to the height of the column of water above the sphere. In other words: the deeper the sphere is located, the more densely it can store energy. As such, the energy storage capacity of the submerged reservoir is not governed by the gravitational energy in the traditional sense, but by the vertical pressure variation.

=== High-density pumped hydro ===
RheEnergise commissioned a 500 kW facility in Plymouth, England in 2026. The aim is to prove the efficiency of pumped storage by using fluid 2.5x denser than water ("a fine-milled suspended solid in water"), such that "projects can be 2.5x smaller for the same power."

=== Dry year storage ===
Sixth Labour Government of New Zealand investigated the use of very large pumped‑storage schemes to manage seasonal hydro‑variability. The proposed Lake Onslow project, part of the government’s NZ Battery initiative, was designed to provide approximately 5 TWh of long‑duration storage to mitigate the country’s “dry‑year” risk, in which reduced inflows to existing hydro lakes can lead to national electricity shortages. The Lake Onslow concept was sized to supply energy over multiple months. The estimated cost of the project was NZ$15.7 billion. In December 2023 the project was cancelled by the Sixth National Government of New Zealand.

== History ==
Principle of the pumped storage power plant as an energy storage system

The first use of pumped storage was in 1907 in Switzerland, at the Engeweiher pumped storage facility near Schaffhausen, Switzerland. In the 1930s reversible hydroelectric turbines became available. This apparatus could operate both as turbine generators and in reverse as electric motor-driven pumps. The latest in large-scale engineering technology is variable speed machines for greater efficiency. These machines operate in synchronization with the network frequency when generating, but operate asynchronously (independent of the network frequency) when pumping.

The first use of pumped-storage in the United States was in 1930 by the Connecticut Electric and Power Company, using a large reservoir located near New Milford, Connecticut, pumping water from the Housatonic River to the storage reservoir 70 metres (230 ft) above.

== Worldwide use ==
In 2009, world pumped storage generating capacity was 104 GW, while other sources claim 127 GW, which comprises the vast majority of all types of utility grade electric storage. The European Union had 38.3 GW net capacity (36.8% of world capacity) out of a total of 140 GW of hydropower and representing 5% of total net electrical capacity in the EU. Japan had 25.5 GW net capacity (24.5% of world capacity).

The six largest operational pumped-storage plants are listed below (for a detailed list see List of pumped-storage hydroelectric power stations):

Station	Country	Location	Installed generation capacity (MW)	Storage capacity (GWh)	Refs
Fengning Pumped Storage Power Station	China	41°39′58″N 116°31′44″E	3,600	40	
Bath County Pumped Storage Station	United States	38°12′32″N 79°48′00″W	3,003	24	
Guangdong Pumped Storage Power Station	China	23°45′52″N 113°57′12″E	2,400		
Huizhou Pumped Storage Power Station	China	23°16′07″N 114°18′50″E	2,400		
Okutataragi Pumped Storage Power Station	Japan	35°14′13″N 134°49′55″E	1,932		
Ludington Pumped Storage Power Plant	United States	43°53′37″N 86°26′43″W	1,872	20	
Note: The power-generating capacity in megawatts is the usual measure for power station size and reflects the maximum instantaneous output power. The energy storage in gigawatt-hours (GWh) is the capacity to store energy, determined by the size of the upper reservoir, the elevation difference, and the generation efficiency.

Countries with the largest power pumped-storage hydro capacity in 2017
Country	Pumped storage generating capacity (GW)	Total installed generating capacity (GW)	Pumped storage/ total generating capacity
China	32.0	1646.0	1.9%
Japan	28.3	322.2	8.8%
United States	22.6	1074.0	2.1%
Italy	7.1	117.0	6.1%
India	6.8	308.8	2.2%
Germany	6.5	204.1	3.2%
Switzerland	6.4	19.6	32.6%
France	5.8	129.3	4.5%
Austria	4.7	25.2	18.7%
South Korea	4.7	103.0	4.6%
Portugal	3.5	19.6	17.8%
Spain (2024)	3.3	129.0	2.6%
Ukraine	3.1	56.9	5.4%
South Africa	2.9	56.6	5.1%
United Kingdom	2.8	94.6	3.0%
Australia	2.6	67.0	3.9%
Russia	2.2	263.5	0.8%
Poland	1.7	37.3	4.6%
Thailand	1.4	41.0	3.4%
Bulgaria	1.4	12.5	9.6%
Belgium	1.2	21.2	5.7%

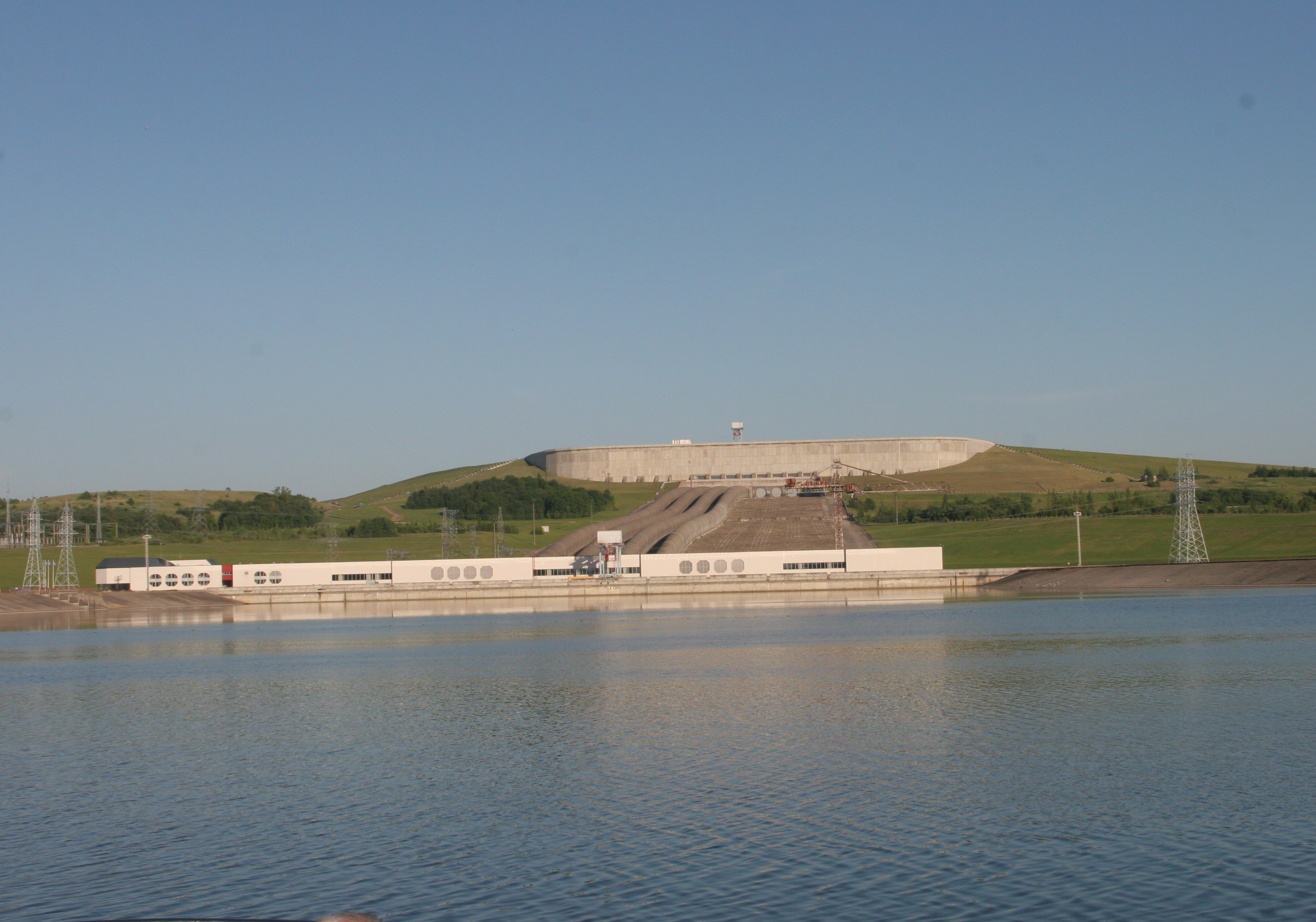
Kruonis Pumped Storage Plant, Lithuania

=== Australia ===
The Wivenhoe Power Station in Queensland was built in 1984. It operates by pumping water from the Wivenhoe Dam up to the Splityard Creek Dam (capacity 28,700 megalitres), from where it can be used to generate 570MW of hydro electricity over 10 hours. It is operated by CleanCo Queensland, a corporation owned by the Queensland Government.

Australia has 15 GW of pumped storage under construction or in development.

Examples include:

- In June 2018, the Australian federal government announced that 14 sites had been identified in Tasmania for pumped storage hydro, with the potential of adding 4.8GW to the national grid if a second interconnector beneath Bass Strait was constructed.
- The Snowy 2.0 project will link two existing dams in the New South Wales' Snowy Mountains to provide 2 GW of capacity and 350 GWh of storage. The project is facing large challenges.
- In September 2022, a pumped hydroelectric storage (PHES) scheme was announced at Pioneer-Burdekin in central Queensland with the potential to be one of the largest PHES in the world at 2.5 — 5 GW / 120 GWh. When the project was cancelled in 2024, power price forecasts increased by 60% for 2035.

=== China ===
China has the largest capacity of pumped-storage hydroelectricity in the world, and is expanding.

In January 2019, the State Grid Corporation of China announced plans to invest US$5.7 billion in five pumped hydro storage plants with a total 6 GW capacity, to be located in Hebei, Jilin, Zhejiang, Shandong provinces, and in Xinjiang Autonomous Region. China is seeking to build 40 GW of pumped hydro capacity installed by 2020.

China added 7.75 GW of PSH in 2024, bringing total installed PSH generation capacity to 58.69 GW. With more than 200 GW of PSH under construction or approved, China is on track to exceed its 2030 target of 120 GW.

=== Norway ===
There are 9 power stations capable of pumping with a total installed capacity of 1344 MW and an average annual production of 2247 GWh. The pumped storage hydropower in Norway is built a bit differently from the rest of the world. They are designed for seasonal pumping. Most of them can also not cycle the water endlessly, but only pump and reuse once. The reason for this is the design of the tunnels and the elevation of lower and upper reservoirs. Some, like Nygard power station, pump water from several river intakes up to a reservoir.

The largest one, Saurdal, which is part of the Ulla-Førre complex, has four 160 MW Francis turbines, but only two are reversible. The lower reservoir is at a higher elevation than the station itself, and thus the water pumped up can only be used once before it has to flow to the next station, Kvilldal, further down the tunnel system. And in addition to the lower reservoir, it will receive water that can be pumped up from 23 river/stream and small reservoir intakes. Some of which will have already gone through a smaller power station on its way.

=== United States ===
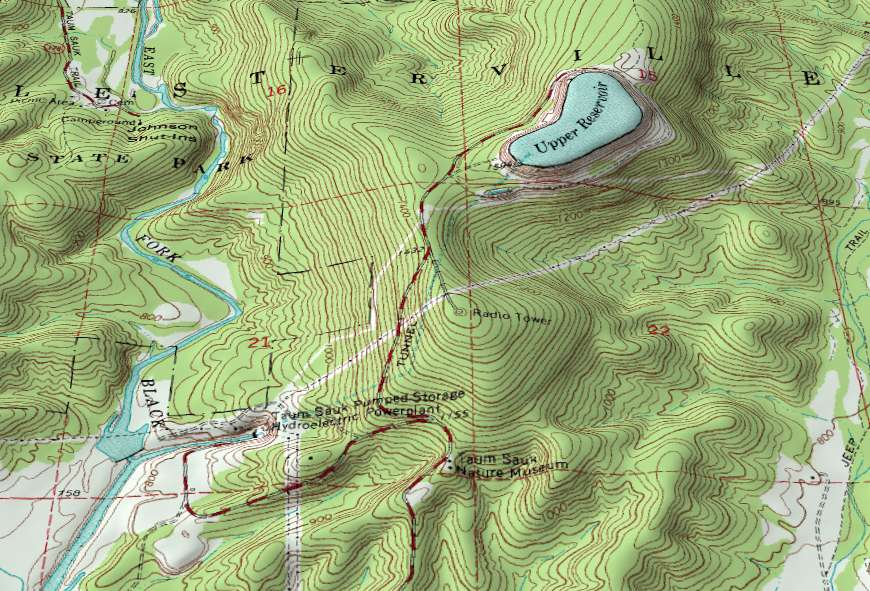
A shaded-relief topo map of the Taum Sauk pumped storage plant in Missouri, United States. The lake on the mountain is built upon a flat surface, requiring a dam around the entire perimeter.

In 2010, the United States had 21.5 GW of pumped storage generating capacity (20.6% of world capacity). PSH contributed 21,073 GWh of energy in 2020 in the United States, but −5,321 GWh (net) because more energy is consumed in pumping than is generated. Nameplate pumped storage capacity had grown to 21.6 GW by 2014, with pumped storage comprising 97% of grid-scale energy storage in the United States. As of late 2014, there were 51 active project proposals with a total of 39 GW of new nameplate capacity across all stages of the FERC licensing process for new pumped storage hydroelectric plants in the United States, but no new plants were currently under construction in the United States at the time.

=== Italy ===
Italy reached peak usage of pumped storage (pompaggi) in 2003, with about 8 TWh. For decades, Italy had excess capacity because its own nuclear program was interrupted in the 1980s, so pumping stations are mostly operated by night when France exports surplus nuclear electricity at near-zero prices. In 2019, the grid operator wanted 6 GW of extra capacity to be built in central and Southern Italy. In 2024, Edison planned 500 MW new capacity.

=== United Kingdom ===
The United Kingdom has four operational pumped-hydro power stations with a generating capacity of 2.8 GW and a total energy capacity of 23.9 GWh. These are Dinorwig (1728 MW), Cruachan (440 MW), Ffestiniog (360 MW), and Foyers (300 MW).

As of 2025, a 1300 MW facility in the Scottish Highlands named Coire Glas is being developed by SSE Renewables with an energy capacity of 30GWh.

=== Indonesia ===
In Indonesia, the Development of Pumped Storage Hydropower in the Java–Bali System is under construction to enhance grid stability and support renewable energy integration in the region. The main component, the Upper Cisokan Pumped Storage (UCPS) plant in West Java, will have an installed capacity of about 1,040 MW (four 260 MW units). The facility will operate in both generation and pumping modes to balance peak and off-peak electricity demand and is designed to provide approximately 6.5 hours of generation per day. The project is co-financed by the World Bank and the Asian Infrastructure Investment Bank (AIIB), with total funding of around US$610 million, and is expected to begin operation around 2025. It represents Indonesia’s first large-scale pumped-storage development and a key milestone in the Java–Bali grid modernization program.

== Hybrid systems ==
Conventional hydroelectric dams may also make use of pumped storage in a hybrid system that both generates power from water naturally flowing into the reservoir as well as storing water pumped back to the reservoir from below the dam. The Grand Coulee Dam in the United States was expanded with a pump-back system in 1973. Existing dams may be repowered with reversing turbines thereby extending the length of time the plant can operate at capacity. Optionally a pump back powerhouse such as the Russell Dam (1992) may be added to a dam for increased generating capacity. Making use of an existing dam's upper reservoir and transmission system can expedite projects and reduce costs.

== See also ==
- Gravity battery – Type of electrical storage device
- Hydropower – Power generation via movement of water
- Tidal power – Technology to convert the energy from tides into useful forms of power
- List of energy storage power plants
- List of long-duration energy storage
- List of pumped-storage hydroelectric power stations
- Methanol economy – Using methanol in the energy transition
