= Zhanghewan Pumped Storage Power Station =

- Country: China
- Location: Jingxing County, Hebei Province
- Coordinates: 37°46′27.49″N 114°3′30.19″E
- Status: Operational
- Construction began: 2003
- Opening date: 2009

Upper reservoir
- Creates: Zhanghewan Upper
- Total capacity: 7,700,000 m^{3} (6,200 acre⋅ft)

Lower reservoir
- Creates: Zhanghewan Reservoir
- Total capacity: 83,300,000 m^{3} (67,500 acre⋅ft)

Power Station
- Hydraulic head: 305 m (1,001 ft)
- Pump-generators: 4 x 250 MW Francis pump turbines
- Installed capacity: 1,000 MW
- Annual generation: 1.6 million kWh

The Zhanghewan Pumped Storage Power Station is a pumped-storage hydroelectric power station located 50 km (31 mi) southwest of Shijiazhuang in Jingxing County of Hebei Province, China. Construction on the power station began on 6 December 2003 and the first unit was commissioned on 1 February 2009. The power station operates by shifting water between an upper and lower reservoir to generate electricity. The lower reservoir is created by the Zhanghewan Dam on the Gantao River which was built between 1977 and 1980, originally for irrigation. For this project the Zhanhewan Dam was raised 23 m (75 ft). The Zhanghewan Upper Reservoir is on Laoyemiao Mountain, above the west side of the lower reservoir. During periods of low energy demand, such as at night, water is pumped from Zhanghewan Lower Reservoir up to the upper reservoir. When energy demand is high, the water is released back down to the lower reservoir but the pump turbines that pumped the water up now reverse mode and serve as generators to produce electricity. The process is repeated as necessary and the plant serves as a peaking power plant.

The lower reservoir is created by the Zhanghewan Dam, a 77.35 m (253.8 ft) tall gravity dam on the Gantao River. It can withhold up to 83,300,000 m^{3} (67,500 acre⋅ft). The upper reservoir is created by a 57 m (187 ft) tall and 456 m (1,496 ft) long circular rock-fill dam on Laoyemiao Mountain, to the west of the lower reservoir. It can withhold up to 7,700,000 m^{3} (6,200 acre⋅ft) of water. Water from the upper reservoir is sent to the 1,200 MW underground power station down near the lower reservoir through four 850 m (2,790 ft) long headrace/penstock pipes. The drop in elevation between the upper and lower reservoir affords a hydraulic head (water drop) of 305 m (1,001 ft).

== See also ==
- List of pumped-storage power stations
