= Yixing Pumped Storage Power Station =

- Interactive map of Yixing Pumped Storage Power Station
- Country: China
- Location: Yixing, Jiangsu Province
- Coordinates: 31°18′52.75″N 119°45′27.99″E
- Status: Operational
- Construction began: 2003
- Opening date: 2007–2008
- Construction cost: US$490 million
- Operator: East China Yixing Pumped Storage Co Ltd

Upper reservoir
- Creates: Yixing Upper
- Total capacity: 5,307,000 m^{3} (4,302 acre⋅ft)

Lower reservoir
- Creates: Huiwu Reservoir
- Total capacity: 5,728,000 m^{3} (4,644 acre⋅ft)

Power Station
- Hydraulic head: 410.8 m (1,348 ft)
- Pump-generators: 4 x 250 MW (340,000 hp) Francis pump turbines
- Installed capacity: 1,000 MW (1,300,000 hp)
- Annual generation: 1.490 billion kWh

The Yixing Pumped Storage Power Station is a pumped-storage hydroelectric power station located Yixing city of Jiangsu Province, China. Construction on the power station began in 2003 and the first unit was commissioned in 2007, the last in 2008. The entire project cost US$490 million, of which US$145 million was provided by the World Bank. The power station operates by shifting water between an upper and lower reservoir to generate electricity. The lower reservoir was formed with the existing Huiwu Dam at the foot of Mount Tongguan. The Yixing Upper Reservoir is located atop Mount Tongguan which peaks at 530 metres (1,740 ft) above sea level. During periods of low energy demand, such as at night, water is pumped from Huiwu Lower Reservoir up to the upper reservoir. When energy demand is high, the water is released back down to the lower reservoir but the pump turbines that pumped the water up now reverse mode and serve as generators to produce electricity. Water from the nearby Huangtong River can also be pumped into the lower reservoir to augment storage. The process is repeated as necessary and the plant serves as a peaking power plant. The power station is operated by East China Yixing Pumped Storage Co Ltd.The station's powerhouse is located about 300 m underground and has an installed capacity of 1,000 MW.

The lower Huiwu Reservoir is created by a 50.4-metre (165 ft) tall and 516.36-metre (1,694.1 ft) long rock-fill dam. It can hold up to 5,728,000 cubic metres (4,644 acre⋅ft) of which 4,560,000 cubic metres (3,700 acre⋅ft) can be pumped to the upper reservoir. The upper reservoir is created by two dams that form a semi-circle on the mountain top. The main is a 47.2 m (155 ft) tall and 498.9 m (1,637 ft) long concrete-face rock-fill dam. The secondary is a 4.9 metres (16 ft) tall and 220 metres (720 ft) long gravity dam composed of roller-compacted concrete. The upper reservoir can withhold up to 5,307,000 cubic metres (4,302 acre⋅ft) of water of which 4,560,000 cubic metres (3,700 acre⋅ft) can be used for power generation. Water from the upper reservoir is sent to the 1,000 megawatts (1,300,000 hp) underground power station down near the lower reservoir through 1,129 metres (3,704 ft) of headrace/penstock pipes. The drop in elevation between the upper and lower reservoir affords a hydraulic head (water drop) of 410.8 metres (1,348 ft).

== See also ==
- List of pumped-storage power stations
