= Xiangshuijian Pumped Storage Power Station =

- Country: China
- Location: Sanshan District, Wuhu City, Anhui Province
- Coordinates: 31°6′47.92″N 118°17′28.43″E
- Status: Operational
- Construction began: 2006
- Opening date: 2011-2012
- Operator(s): State Grid Xinyuan Co Ltd

Upper reservoir
- Creates: Xiangshuijian Upper
- Total capacity: 17,480,000 m^{3} (14,170 acre⋅ft)

Lower reservoir
- Creates: Xiangshuijian Lower
- Total capacity: 14,350,000 m^{3} (11,630 acre⋅ft)

Power Station
- Hydraulic head: 363 m (1,191 ft)
- Pump-generators: 4 x 250 MW (340,000 hp) Francis pump turbines
- Installed capacity: 1,000 MW (1,300,000 hp)
- Annual generation: 1.8 billion kWh

The Xiangshuijian Pumped Storage Power Station is a pumped-storage hydroelectric power station located 29 kilometres (18 mi) southwest of Wuhu City in Sanshan District of Anhui Province, China. Construction on the power station began on 8 December 2006 and the upper reservoir dam was completed in October 2010. The first unit was commissioned on 1 December 2011 and the last on 17 November 2012. The power station operates by shifting water between an upper and lower reservoir to generate electricity. The lower reservoir was formed with the creation of the Xiangshuijian Lower Dam in a valley. The Xiangshuijian Upper Reservoir is in another valley above the west side of the lower reservoir. During periods of low energy demand, such as at night, water is pumped from Xiangshuijian Lower Reservoir up to the upper reservoir. When energy demand is high, the water is released back down to the lower reservoir but the pump turbines that pumped the water up now reverse mode and serve as generators to produce electricity. The process is repeated as necessary and the plant serves as a peaking power plant.

The lower reservoir is created by a 21.5-metre-tall (71 ft) circular dam. It holds up to 14,350,000 cubic metres (11,630 acre⋅ft) of water. The upper reservoir is created by an 89.5-metre-tall (294 ft) and 530-metre-long (1,740 ft) concrete-face rock-fill dam. It can withhold up to 48,510,000 cubic metres (39,330 acre⋅ft) of water. Water from the upper reservoir is sent to the 1,000 megawatts (1,300,000 hp) underground power station down near the lower reservoir through headrace/penstock pipes. The drop in elevation between the upper and lower reservoir affords a hydraulic head (water drop) of 363 metres (1,191 ft).

== See also ==
- List of pumped-storage power stations
