= Xilongchi Pumped Storage Power Station =

- Country: China
- Location: Wutai County, Xinzhou, Shanxi Province
- Coordinates: 38°32′12.65″N 113°16′20.24″E
- Status: Operational
- Construction began: 2001
- Opening date: 2008

Upper reservoir
- Creates: Xilongchi Upper
- Total capacity: 48,510,000 m^{3} (39,330 acre⋅ft)

Lower reservoir
- Creates: Xilongchi Lower
- Total capacity: 49,420,000 m^{3} (40,070 acre⋅ft)

Power Station
- Hydraulic head: 624 m (2,047 ft)
- Pump-generators: 4 x 300 MW Francis pump turbines
- Installed capacity: 1,200 MW
- Annual generation: 1.8 billion kWh

The Xilongchi Pumped Storage Power Station is a pumped-storage hydroelectric power station located 50 km (31 mi) east of Xinzhou in Wutai County of Shanxi Province, China. It was constructed between 2001 and 2008. The power station operates by shifting water between an upper and lower reservoir to generate electricity. The lower reservoir was formed with the creation of the Xilongchi Lower Dam. The Xilongchi Upper Reservoir is located high atop a mountain above the northeast side of the lower reservoir. Both reservoirs are located between the confluence of the Hutuo and Qingshui Rivers. During periods of low energy demand, such as at night, water is pumped from Xilongchi Lower Reservoir up to the upper reservoir. When energy demand is high, the water is released back down to the lower reservoir but the pump turbines that pumped the water up now reverse mode and serve as generators to produce electricity. The process is repeated as necessary and the plant serves as a peaking power plant.

The lower reservoir is created by a 97 m (318 ft) tall and 533 m (1,749 ft) long rock-fill dam with asphalt concrete facing on a mountain-side just about the Hutuo River. It can withhold up to 49,420,000 m^{3} (40,070 acre⋅ft) of water. The upper reservoir is created by a 50 m (160 ft) tall and 499.6 m (1,639 ft) long rock-fill dam with asphalt concrete facing. It can withhold up to 48,510,000 m^{3} (39,330 acre⋅ft) of water. Water from the upper reservoir is sent to the 1,200 MW underground power station down near the lower reservoir through headrace/penstock pipes. The drop in elevation between the upper and lower reservoir affords a hydraulic head (water drop) of 624 m (2,047 ft).

== See also ==
- List of pumped-storage power stations
