= Coo-Trois-Ponts Hydroelectric Power Station =

Pumped-storage hydroelectric power station in Belgium

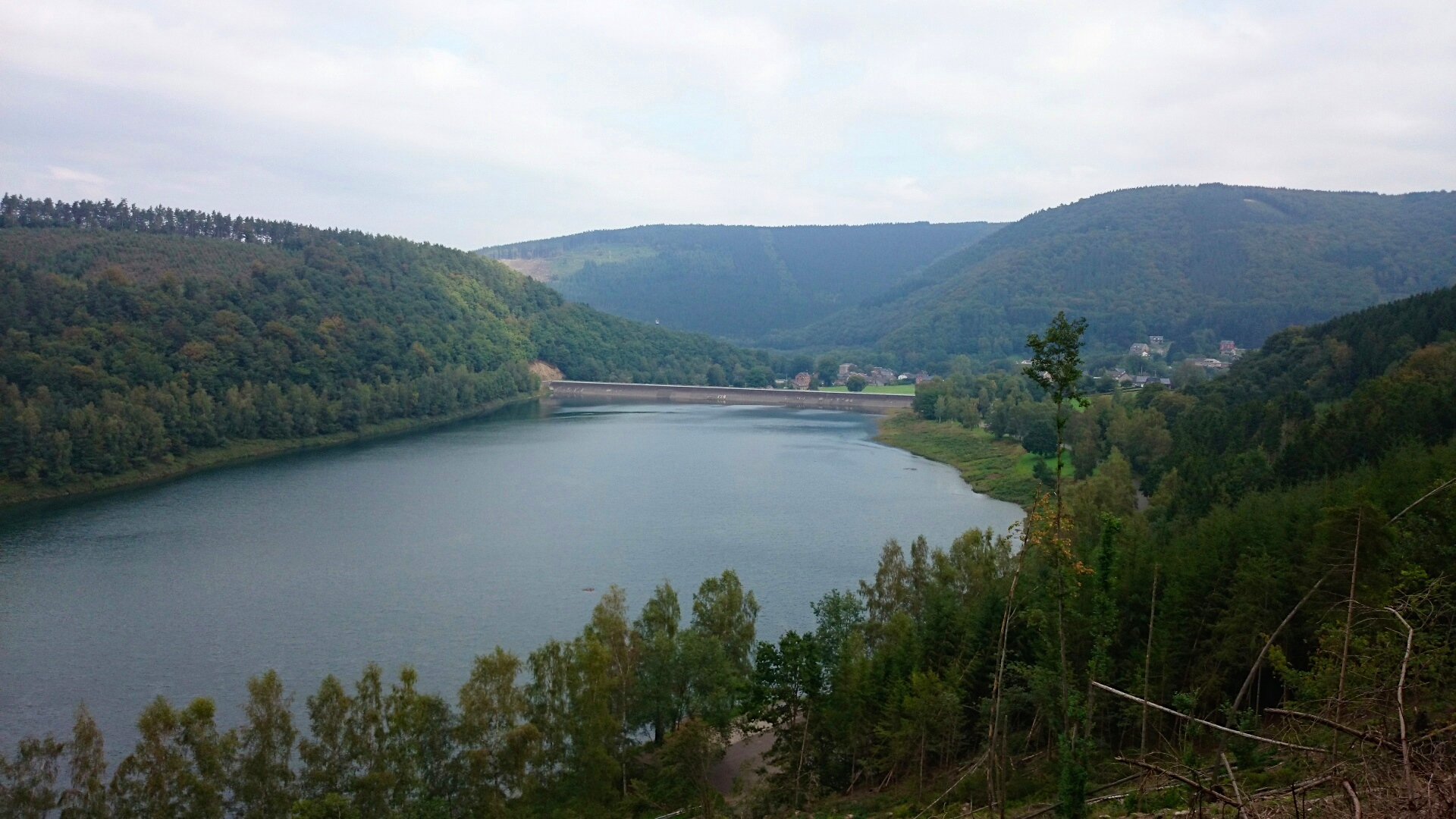
- Upper reservoir of the pumped-storage installation
- Interactive map of Coo-Trois-Ponts Hydroelectric Power Station
- Country: Belgium
- Location: Coo, Stavelot, Province of Liège
- Coordinates: 50°23′12″N 05°51′26″E
- Status: Operational
- Construction began: 1967
- Opening date: 1971–1972 (Coo I); 1979 (Coo II)
- Owner: Electrabel
- Operator: Electrabel

Upper dam and spillways
- Type of dam: Embankment (upper reservoirs); Concrete (lower reservoir)

Upper reservoir
- Creates: Upper reservoirs
- Total capacity: 4,000,000 m³ (Coo I); 4,540,000 m³ (Coo II); Total: 8,540,000 m³
- Normal elevation: about 500 m (1,640 ft)

Lower dam and spillways
- Impounds: Amblève

Lower reservoir
- Creates: Lower reservoir
- Total capacity: 8,540,000 m³

Coo I and Coo II
- Commission date: 1971–1972 (Coo I); 1979 (Coo II)
- Type: Pumped-storage
- Hydraulic head: 275 m (902 ft) maximum
- Turbines: 6 × reversible Francis pump-turbines
- Installed capacity: Max head; 3 × 158 MW (Coo I); 3 × 220 MW (Coo II); Average head; 1089 MW
- Overall efficiency: 75%
- Storage capacity: 5 hours (Coo I); 6 hours (Coo II)

The Coo-Trois-Ponts Hydroelectric Power Station is a pumped-storage hydroelectric power station in eastern Belgium, located near Coo in the valley of the Amblève, on the territory of Stavelot and Trois-Ponts in the Province of Liège. Operated by Electrabel, it is Belgium's principal large-scale electricity-storage facility and one of the largest pumped-storage installations in Europe.

The station consists of two upper reservoirs on Mont Saint-Victor, a lower reservoir occupying a former meander of the Amblève, two large hydraulic circuits, and an underground powerhouse equipped with six reversible Francis pump-turbines. During periods of low electricity demand or surplus generation, water is pumped from the lower reservoir to the upper reservoirs. During periods of high demand, the water is released back through the turbines to generate electricity.

Coo was developed in two main phases: the first three units, known as Coo I, were commissioned in 1971–1972, and the three additional Coo II units were commissioned in 1979. Its original function was closely connected with the development of nuclear power in Belgium. The plant was designed to help balance the output of large, relatively inflexible nuclear power stations at Doel and Tihange, absorbing electricity during off-peak periods and returning it to the grid during peak demand.

Since the liberalisation of electricity markets and the growth of wind and solar generation in the Belgian energy mix, Coo's role has broadened. It remains a load-shifting plant but it is also used for short-term flexibility, reserve power, voltage regulation, black-start capability, and portfolio balancing in day-ahead, intraday, and ancillary-services markets.

== Background and site ==
Pumped storage does not create energy. It stores electricity by using it to pump water uphill, thereby converting electrical energy into gravitational potential energy. When electricity is needed, the water is released downhill through turbines. The value of the system lies in its ability to shift energy from periods of low demand or surplus production to periods when dispatchable power is needed.

The site at Coo was chosen because the Amblève valley provides one of the few locations in Belgium with a local height difference of more than 250 m (820 ft), making it suitable for high-head pumped storage. The upper reservoirs are located on Mont Saint-Victor, near Brume, while the lower reservoir lies in the valley below, beside the village of Coo.

The lower reservoir occupies an old meander of the Amblève known as the Tour de Coo. In the eighteenth century, monks from Stavelot Abbey modified the course of the river to protect the village of Petit-Coo from flooding and to supply a local mill. They created the Coo waterfall, leaving the former meander with only a limited natural flow. This topography later allowed engineers to convert the meander into the lower basin of a closed-cycle pumped-storage installation.

== Construction and development ==
Belgian electricity producers began looking for a site for a pumped-storage plant in the 1960s. The selected Coo site combined a natural lower-basin form with nearby high ground suitable for artificial upper reservoirs. Construction was carried out in two phases. The first phase began in 1967 and created Coo I, composed of three reversible pump-turbine units. The first electricity from a Coo unit was supplied to the Belgian grid in October 1971, and the first three units were commissioned between 1971 and 1972. The second phase began in 1975 and added Coo II, with three further units commissioned in 1979.

The lower reservoir was formed by building two dams at the ends of the former Amblève meander. A diversion gallery was excavated to allow flood flows in the river to bypass the basin, and a drainage gallery was provided so that the lower reservoir could be emptied for maintenance or emergency purposes.

The two upper reservoirs were excavated on Mont Saint-Victor. Rock and soil removed from the interior of the basins were reused to form peripheral levees, limiting the need for imported material. The underground cavern was excavated in one phase so that it could eventually receive all six generating groups, including those installed during the later Coo II phase.

== Design ==
=== General layout ===
Representation of the pumped-storage installation of Coo.

Coo-Trois-Ponts is divided into two separate hydraulic and electromechanical sections. Each section has one upper basin, one penstock and three reversible pump-turbine groups. Therefore, the plant counts as two energy storage systems: Coo I and Coo II. The connection between the turbine groups and the lower reservoir is common to both sections.

The plant operates in a closed-water cycle. Rainfall and additional inflow are drained from the lower reservoir to the river, but the working volume used for energy storage is repeatedly cycled between the lower and upper reservoirs.

=== Reservoirs ===
The two upper reservoirs are artificial basins built on Mont Saint-Victor. The first upper basin, serving Coo I, has a useful capacity of about 4,000,000 m^{3} (3,243 acre⋅ft), with useful operating levels between 483.4 m (1,586 ft) and 509.1 m (1,670 ft) above sea level. The second upper basin, serving Coo II, has a useful capacity of about 4,540,000 m^{3} (3,681 acre⋅ft), with useful operating levels between 479.3 m (1,573 ft) and 507.1 m (1,664 ft).

The lower reservoir has a useful capacity of about 8,540,000 m^{3} (6,923 acre⋅ft), corresponding to the combined active capacity of the two upper basins. Its useful operating levels range between 233.75 m (767 ft) and 248.45 m (815 ft) above sea level.

Both upper basins were sealed with an impermeable bituminous-concrete lining. The lining includes drainage layers and individually drained panels, allowing leakage to be monitored from control rooms outside the reservoirs. Rehabilitation of the lining of the first upper basin became an important element of later maintenance work.

=== Penstocks and hydraulic head ===
The maximum elevation head is approximately 275 m (902 ft), though the effective head varies according to the levels in the upper and lower reservoirs. For Coo I, the head varies from about 234.95 m (771 ft) to 275.35 m (903 ft). For Coo II, it varies from about 230.85 m (757 ft) to 273.35 m (897 ft).

Coo I and Coo II have different penstock designs. The Coo I penstock includes a vertical intake, a 180 m (591 ft) shaft, a long sub-horizontal section, an inclined section and a distributor leading to the spherical rotary valves. Its length is about 995 m (3,264 ft), with diameter reducing from about 6.6 m (22 ft) to 5.65 m (19 ft).

The Coo II penstock follows a more linear route, with a lateral intake, inclined sections and a distributor leading to the spherical rotary valves. It is about 1,055 m (3,461 ft) long, with diameter varying from about 8 m (26 ft) to 6.2 m (20 ft).

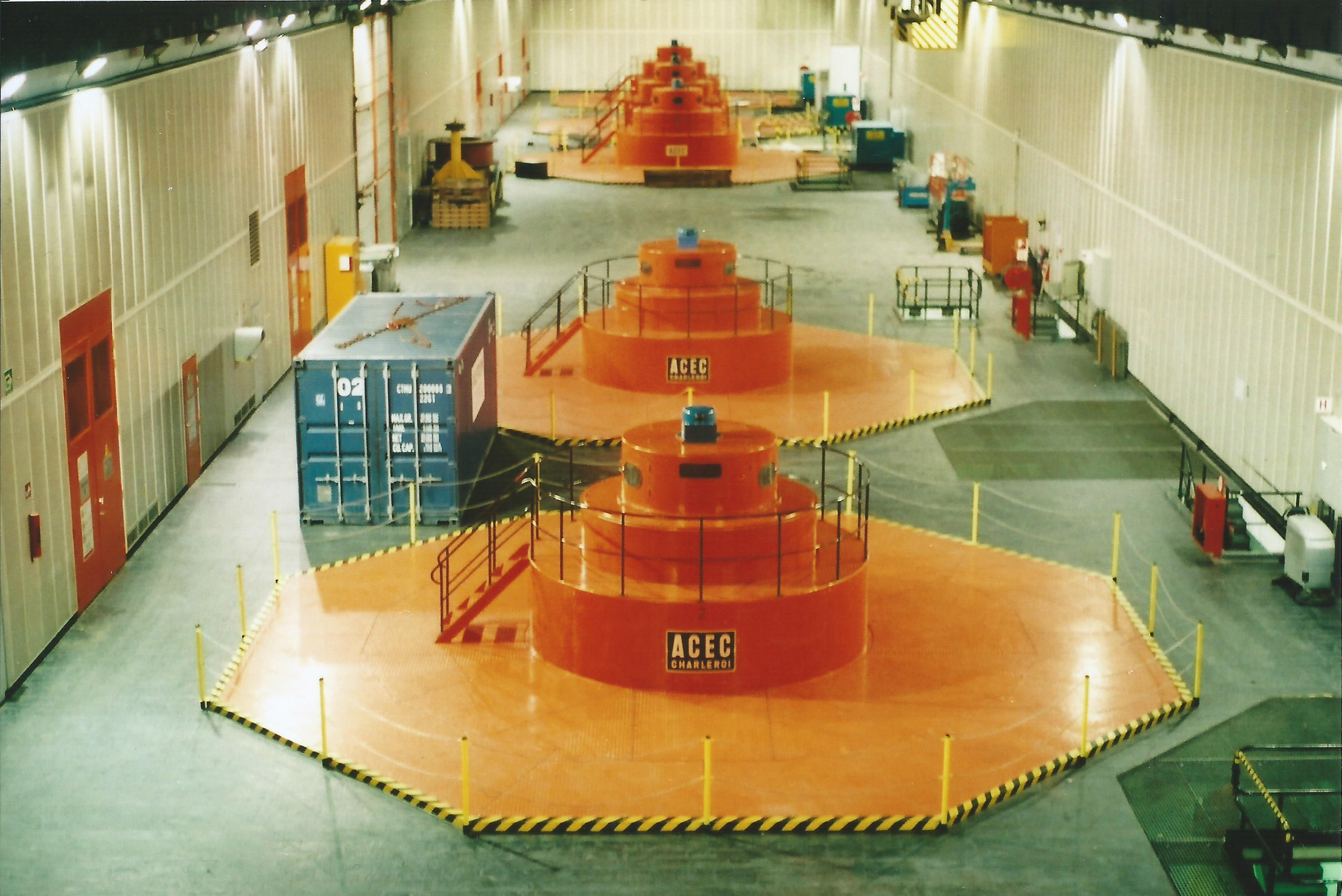
View inside the underground powerhouse, showing several machine units.

=== Underground power station ===
The underground power station is located in a cavern excavated in the hill between the reservoirs. The cavern is about 128 m (420 ft) long, 22 m (72 ft) wide and 40 m (131 ft) high. The excavation of the cavern and associated access galleries removed about 275,000 m^{3} (359,686 cu yd) of rock.

The cavern contains six independent unit structures and a central area for control and common equipment. It is connected to multiple galleries, including the main access gallery, the visitor access gallery, galleries used for excavation, and galleries carrying high-voltage conductors from the alternators to the transformers outside the cavern.

=== Mechanical equipment ===
The six generating groups are vertical-shaft reversible Francis pump-turbines designed to permit removal of the runner from above. In generating mode, water flows from an upper reservoir through the penstock, spiral case, wicket gates and turbine runner, then discharges through the draft tube and tailrace toward the lower reservoir. In pumping mode, the same hydraulic machine reverses function and lifts water from the lower reservoir to the upper basin.

Each group is equipped with a spherical rotary valve upstream of the spiral case. This valve isolates the unit from the upper reservoir and is opened or closed during starting, stopping and maintenance operations. The Coo I valves are operated by pressurised water from the penstock, while the Coo II valves use oil pressure for opening and penstock water pressure for closing.

The runners are located at the lowest point of each group, beneath the alternator. The Coo I runners have a diameter of about 4.6 m (15 ft) and weigh about 36.3 t (40.0 short tons); the Coo II runners have a diameter of about 5.285 m (17 ft) and weigh about 56.2 t (61.9 short tons).

=== Electrical equipment ===
In each group, the motor used for pumping and the generator used for turbine operation are the same synchronous machine. The Coo I machines have an AC power of about 200 MVA and the Coo II machines about 230 MVA. Coo I rotates at 300 rpm, while Coo II rotates at 272 rpm. The original manufacturer of the electrical motors was ACEC. Each generator is connected to a 20 kV switchgear. Power is carried out of the cavern to 20 kV/400 kV transformers, one per unit, and then connected to the Belgian transmission grid. The nearby Brume 380 kV substation links the installation to the high-voltage transmission grid operated by Elia, including high-voltage connections toward the Province of Luxembourg and the Tihange area.

== Operation ==
Coo-Trois-Ponts can operate in both generating and pumping modes. In generating mode, the plant can reach rated power in about 90 seconds. In pump mode, starting takes about five minutes. The plant is capable of starting in less than two minutes and delivering power comparable to a 1-GW nuclear reactor for up to 6 hours. The change between turbine and pump mode is achieved by reversing the direction of rotation, with phase reversal carried out behind the 20 kV switchgear. Pump-mode starting is more complex than turbine-mode starting. The runner is first dewatered by compressed air, then a 6 kV auxiliary power unit accelerates the unit toward synchronous speed. After synchronisation, the main generator-motor is connected to the grid and the runner is refilled so that pumping can begin.

At maximum head, the three Coo I units are rated at about 3 × 158 MW in turbine mode, while the three Coo II units are rated at about 3 × 220 MW. At minimum head, the corresponding turbine-mode ratings fall to about 3 × 115 MW for Coo I and 3 × 187 MW for Coo II. Pumping-mode ratings are lower than turbine-mode ratings. The maximum turbine-mode flow is about 3 × 65 m^{3}/s (2,295 cu ft/s) for Coo I and 3 × 109 m^{3}/s (3,849 cu ft/s) for Coo II.

The station has about 2,300 MWh (8,300 GJ) of storage capacity in Coo I and 2,700 MWh (9,700 GJ) in Coo II, for a total of about 5,000 MWh (18,000 GJ) in the original technical configuration. It is characterized by a roundtrip efficiency of 75%. Recent modernization works increased its storage capacity by about 450 MWh (1,600 GJ) and power output by about 79 MW (106,000 hp). At full capacity, Coo I can sustain generation for approximately five hours and Coo II for approximately six hours before repumping is required.

== Relationship with the development of the Belgian nuclear power program ==
From the late 1970s, Belgian electricity policy increasingly relied on the development of nuclear energy and the construction of large pressurised water reactors at Doel and Tihange. The first commercial nuclear reactors, Doel 1, Doel 2 and Tihange 1, entered service in 1975, followed by Doel 3 in 1982, Tihange 2 in 1983, and Doel 4 and Tihange 3 in 1985.

Coo-Trois-Ponts was built during the same period as Belgium's major nuclear-power program. The purpose of the project was to balance the electricity demand with the increasing supply from the non-flexible power generation of Doel and Tihange. These Belgian nuclear reactors were designed to provide large quantities of baseload electricity, but were not designed to operate in a load-following mode. They are less suited than hydroelectric or gas-fired plants to frequent short-term changes in demand. Pumped storage therefore complemented the nuclear fleet by using off-peak electricity to pump water uphill and then returning electricity to the grid during peak periods.

The link between Coo and nuclear generation was a system-level relationship rather than a direct physical pairing between one reactor and one pumped-storage unit. Coo was connected to the Belgian transmission network and could absorb or deliver electricity according to system conditions. Its role was to make the large Belgian power plants more flexible by converting part of the output of large baseload units into dispatchable peak power.In addition, It also provides the necessary ac power to the Tihange nuclear power plant to guarantee nuclear safety or support accident recovery in case of a loss of offsite power (LOOP).

The sequence of commissioning of Coo-Trois-Ponts also follows the commissioning of the nuclear reactor fleet. Coo I was completed shortly before the first Belgian nuclear reactors entered service, while Coo II followed before the second wave of larger reactors at Doel and Tihange was completed. The plant therefore formed part of the same electricity-system transformation that brought nuclear power to the centre of Belgian generation in the 1970s and 1980s.

In the twenty-first century, this nuclear-support role did not disappear, but it started to provide a wider flexibility function to the Belgian transmission grid. Coo can still respond to the sudden loss or unavailability of a large generating unit, including a nuclear unit, but its operation is now also shaped by electricity-market prices, cross-border flows and the variability of wind and solar power generation.

== Role in contemporary electricity markets and grid services ==
Belgium has limited geography suitable for large pumped-storage schemes. The Coo-Trois-Ponts plant therefore occupies a central role in the country's electricity-storage capacity. Coo is frequently described as a large "battery" for Belgium. Technically, it is not an electrochemical battery, but the comparison reflects its system function: it stores electricity indirectly as gravitational potential energy and returns it when the grid requires flexible power.

Historically, the station was an infrastructure complement to the nuclear build-out of the 1970s and 1980s. It allowed part of the steady output of Doel and Tihange to be shifted from low-demand periods to high-demand periods, improving the flexibility of a system increasingly based on large baseload plants. Coo's original operating pattern was relatively simple: pump during off-peak hours, especially at night, and generate during peak consumption. In addition to generating and pumping modes, the plant was also designed to operate as synchronous condenser and to provide spinning reserve. This reflected the needs of a Belgian electricity system dominated by large thermal and nuclear baseload units.

The plant's strategic importance lies not only in its installed capacity but also in its speed of response. Unlike most large thermal or nuclear power stations, Coo can move from standby to high output within minutes and can absorb electricity when the system has surplus supply.

The development of liberalized electricity markets and the growth of intermittent renewable generation in Belgium changed the plant's economics. The pumped-storage operator now bids available capacity into day-ahead markets, adjust positions on intraday markets, and provide ancillary services to the transmission-system operator. Coo can provide several types of system service, including voltage regulation, frequency containment reserves, automatic and manual frequency restoration reserves. It can also be used for portfolio optimisation, allowing the operator to manage deviations in demand caused by unplanned outages, weather forecast errors, renewable intermittency, or changes in economic market conditions.

The station is also remunerated by the Belgian transmission system operator for maintaining the ability to help restore the grid after a blackout or support it in emergency states. For this purpose, a minimum amount of water must be kept available in the upper reservoirs so that generation can begin without depending on normal grid conditions.

== Modernization and expansion ==
Electrabel considered during the 2010s a major expansion of the Coo installation, including a possible third upper reservoir and additional turbines. The project would have increased the plant's storage and generating capacity, but it was not pursued.

A later modernization program focused on upgrading the existing installation. The program includes civil-engineering works, rehabilitation of reservoir structures, refurbishment or replacement of electromechanical equipment, and improvements to operating performance. The asphalt-concrete lining of the first upper reservoir was repaired, after ageing and cracking increased leakage, and a new sealing system applied. This modernization program led to an increase in energy storage and power capacity by 7.5 per cent while extending the plant's operational life by about 40 years. The works added 450 MWh (1,600 GJ) of storage capacity and about 79 MW (106,000 hp) of additional power.

== Gallery ==
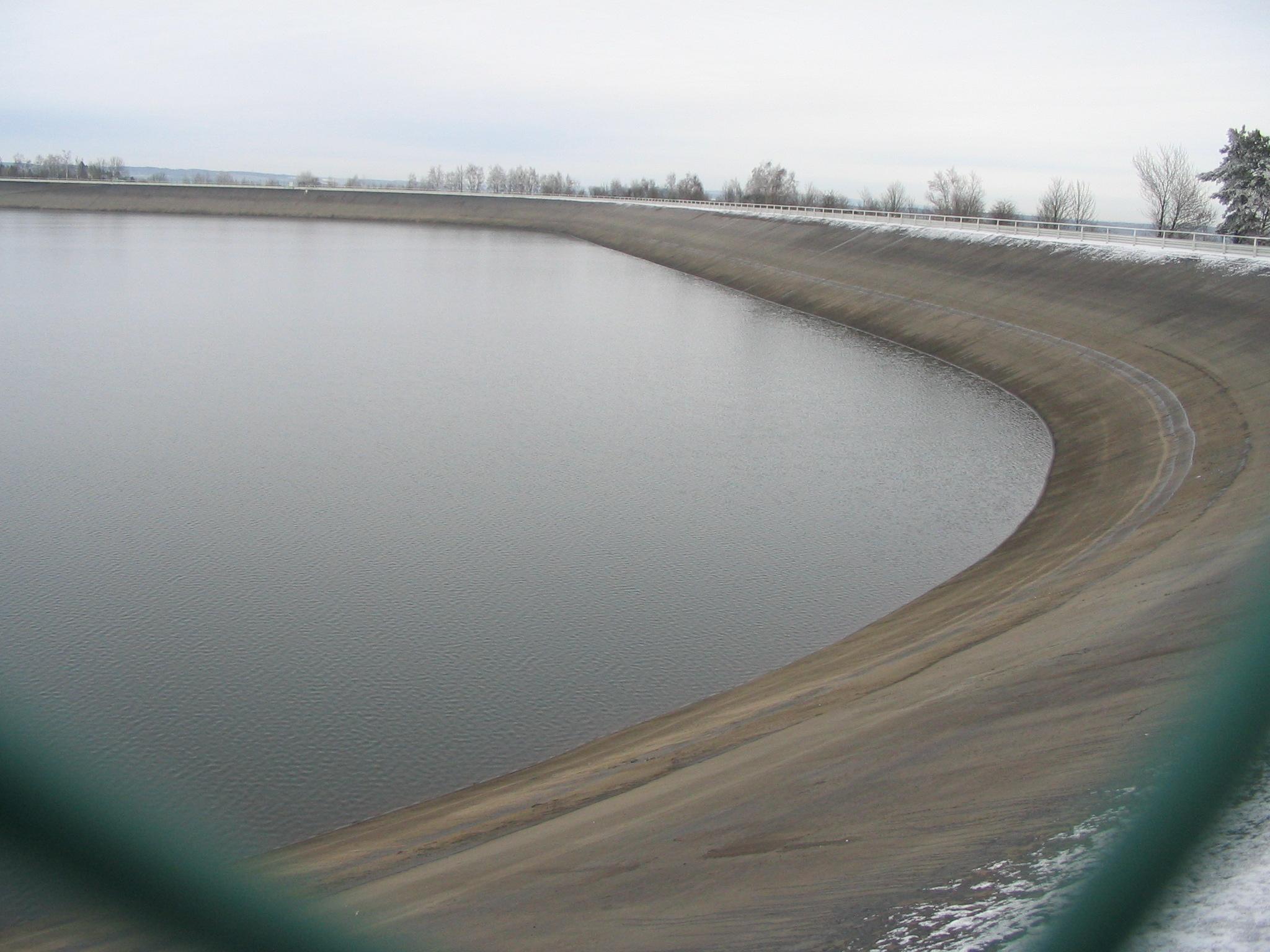
Upper reservoir.

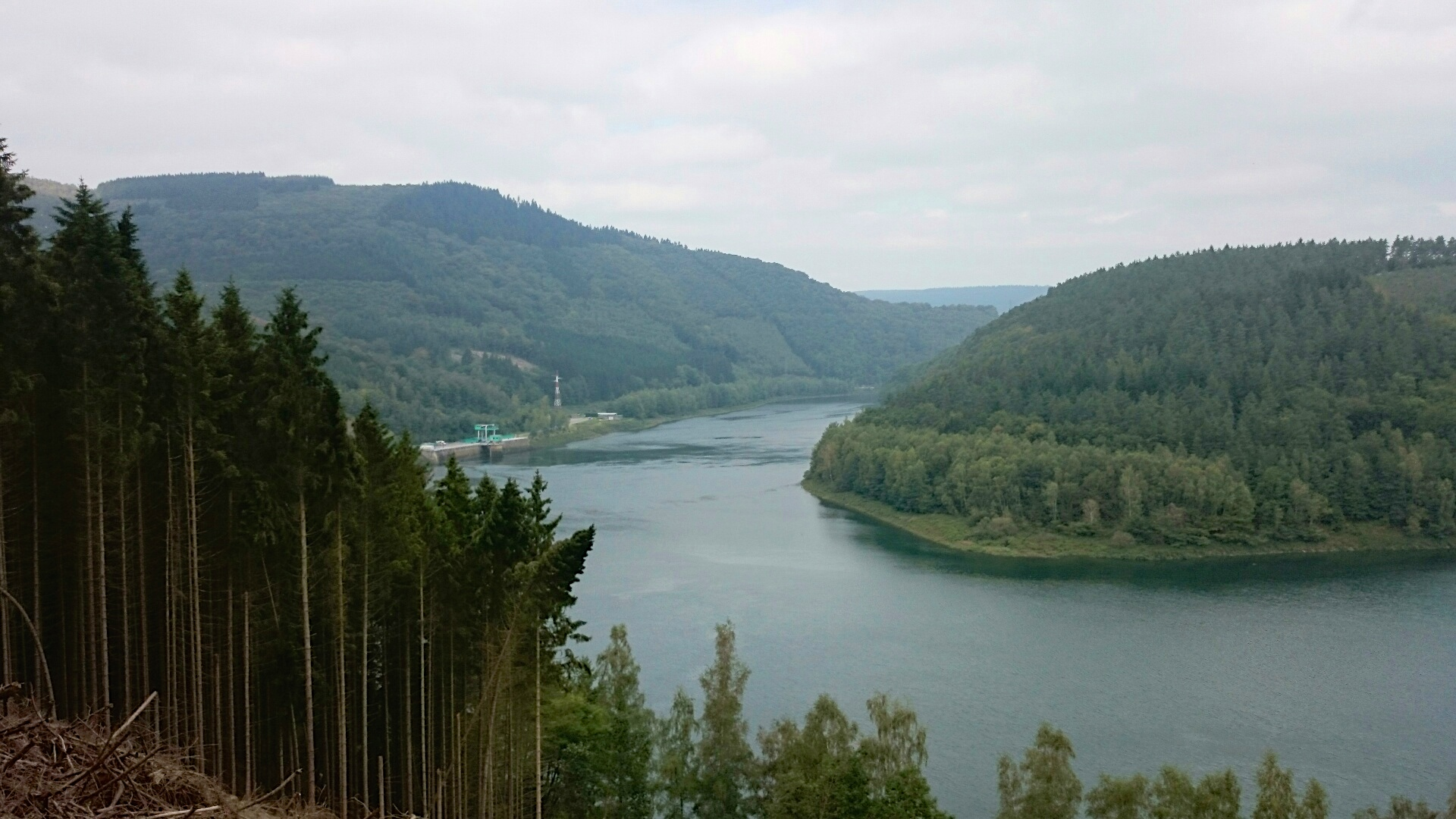
Lower reservoir.

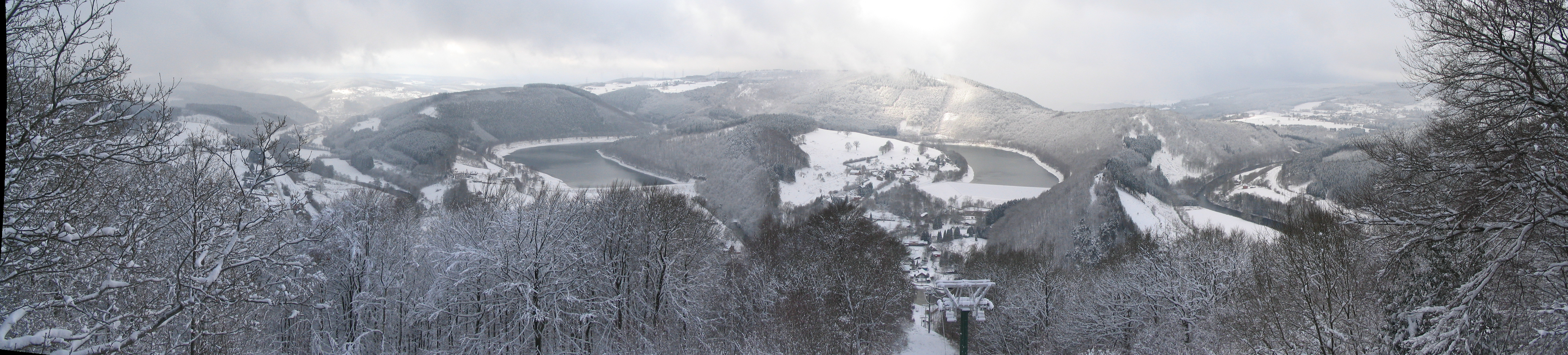
Winter panorama of the lower reservoir in the former meander of the Amblève.

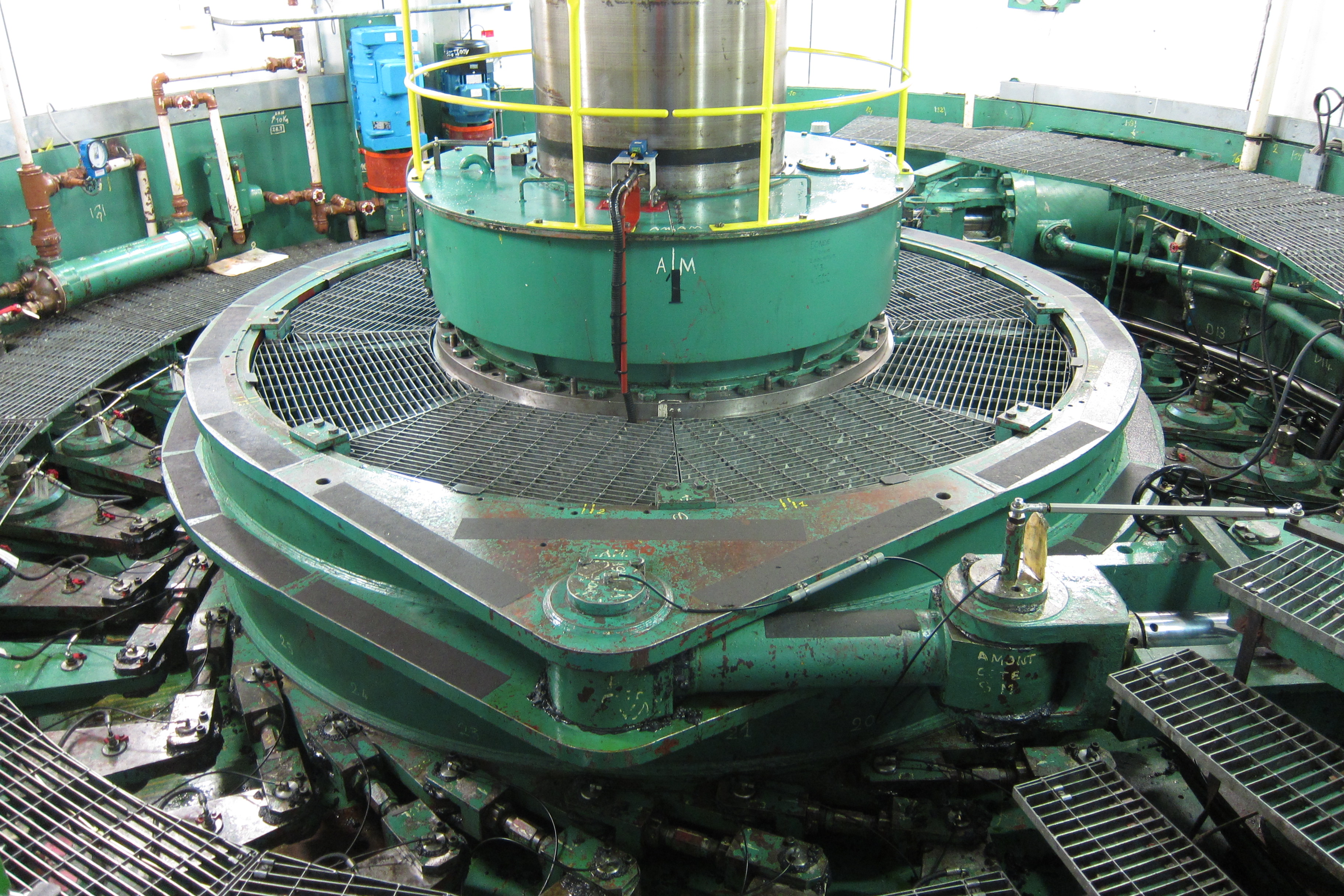
Turbine shaft.

== See also ==
- Electricity sector in Belgium
- List of pumped-storage hydroelectric power stations
- Nuclear power in Belgium
- Pumped-storage hydroelectricity
- Vianden Pumped Storage Plant

== Sources ==
- American Society of Civil Engineers Task Committee on Pumped Storage (1996). Hydroelectric Pumped Storage Technology: International Experience. New York: American Society of Civil Engineers. ISBN 978-0-7844-0144-6.
- Elia (2022). "Map of the high-voltage grid 2022" (PDF). Elia.
- ENGIE (2026). "Coo pumped storage power station". ENGIE Belgium.
- ENGIE (2026). "Nuclear energy". ENGIE Belgium.
- GE Vernova (2021). "Grid Solutions provides upgrade services for pumped-storage application, helping customers achieve energy transition objectives". GE Vernova.
- Geth, Frederik; Brijs, Tom; Kathan, Johannes; Driesen, Johan; Belmans, Ronnie (2015). "An overview of large-scale stationary electricity storage plants in Europe: Current status and new developments". Renewable and Sustainable Energy Reviews. 52: 1212–1227. Bibcode:2015RSERv..52.1212G. doi:10.1016/j.rser.2015.07.145.
- Höllerhage, Florian (2021). "Rehabilitierung des Oberbeckens 1 des Pumpspeicherkraftwerks Coo-Trois-Ponts in Belgien". Wasserbau-Symposium 2021 (in German). Bundesanstalt für Wasserbau.
- Knack (11 May 2021). "Engie breidt spaarbekkencentrale Coo uit" (in Dutch). Archived from the original on 27 October 2021.
- La Libre Belgique (19 May 2015). "Electrabel songe à doper la capacité de sa centrale de Coo de 50%". La Libre Belgique (in French).
- Locht, Marc; Georis, Bruno; Mercier, Thomas (2022). "A Typical PHES Unit, the Example of Coo in Belgium". In Cabeza, Luisa F. (ed.). Encyclopedia of Energy Storage. Vol. 1. Elsevier. pp. 104–122. doi:10.1016/B978-0-12-819723-3.00144-X. ISBN 978-0-12-819723-3.
- Pfafflin, Goetz E. (1969). "Coo-Trois-Ponts project. Off-peak stored energy supplies peak power". Allis-Chalmers Engineering Review. 34 (1): 12–16.
- Pujades, Estanislao; Orban, Philippe; Archambeau, Pierre; Erpicum, Sébastien; Dassargues, Alain (2020). "Underground Pumped Storage Hydropower Case Studies in Belgium: A Review of Potential Sites and Technical Constraints". Energies. 13 (15) 4000: 1–24. doi:10.3390/en13154000. hdl:2013/ULB-DIPOT:oai:dipot.ulb.ac.be:2013/313067.
- Tractebel (2026). "Coo-Trois-Ponts Hydroelectric Power Station". Tractebel.
- Voith Hydro (19 October 2021). "Voith Hydro upgrades three power units from Belgium's largest pumped storage plant Coo-Trois-Ponts". voith.com.
