= Pushihe Pumped Storage Power Station =

- Country: China
- Location: Kuandian County, Liaoning Province
- Coordinates: 40°25′15.47″N 124°41′0.92″E
- Status: Operational
- Construction began: August 2006
- Opening date: September 2012

Upper reservoir
- Creates: Pushihe Upper
- Total capacity: 12,560,000 m^{3} (10,180 acre⋅ft)

Lower reservoir
- Creates: Pushihe Lower
- Total capacity: 29,050,000 m^{3} (23,550 acre⋅ft)

Power Station
- Hydraulic head: 326 m (1,070 ft)
- Pump-generators: 4 x 300 MW Francis pump turbines
- Installed capacity: 1,200 MW
- Annual generation: 1 billion kWh

The Pushihe Pumped Storage Power Station (Chinese: 丹东蒲石河抽水蓄能电站) is a pumped-storage hydroelectric power station located 54 km (34 mi) northeast of Dandong in Kuandian County of Liaoning Province, China. It was constructed between August 2006 and September 2012. The power station operates by shifting water between an upper and lower reservoir to generate electricity. The lower reservoir was formed with the creation of the Pushihe Lower Dam on the Pushihe River, a tributary of the Yalu River. The Pushihe Upper Reservoir is located in a valley above the east side of the lower reservoir. During periods of low energy demand, such as at night, water is pumped from Pushihe Lower Reservoir up to the upper reservoir. When energy demand is high, the water is released back down to the lower reservoir but the pump turbines that pumped the water up now reverse mode and serve as generators to produce electricity. The process is repeated as necessary and the plant serves as a peaking power plant.

The lower reservoir, which was constructed between December 2006 and 2009, is created by a 34.1 m (112 ft) tall and 336 m (1,102 ft) long gravity dam on the Pushihe River. It can withhold up to 29,050,000 m^{3} (23,550 acre⋅ft) of water, of which 16,210,000 m^{3} (13,140 acre⋅ft) can be pumped to the upper reservoir. The upper reservoir is created by a 76.5 m (251 ft) tall and 691 m (2,267 ft) long concrete-face rock-fill dam. It was constructed between April 2007 and November 2009. It can withhold up to 12,560,000 m^{3} (10,180 acre⋅ft) of water, of which 10,290,000 m^{3} (8,340 acre⋅ft) can be used for power production. Water from the upper reservoir is sent to the 1,200 MW underground power station down near the lower reservoir through four 1,368.4 m (4,490 ft) long headrace/penstock pipes. The drop in elevation between the upper and lower reservoir affords a hydraulic head (water drop) of 326 m (1,070 ft).

== See also ==
- List of pumped-storage power stations
