= Xianyou Pumped Storage Power Station =

- Country: China
- Location: Xianyou County, Putian, Fujian Province
- Coordinates: 25°31′37.25″N 118°31′59.19″E
- Status: Operational
- Construction began: May 2009
- Opening date: April–December 2013

Upper reservoir
- Creates: Xianyou Upper
- Total capacity: 17,350,000 m^{3} (14,070 acre⋅ft)

Lower reservoir
- Creates: Xianyou Lower
- Total capacity: 17,980,000 m^{3} (14,580 acre⋅ft)

Power Station
- Hydraulic head: 430 m (1,410 ft)
- Pump-generators: 4 x 300 MW Francis pump turbines
- Installed capacity: 1,200 MW
- Annual generation: 1.9 billion kWh (est.)

Xianyou Pumped Storage Power Station is a pumped-storage hydroelectric power station located 47 km (29 mi) west of Putian in Xianyou County of Fujian Province, China. Construction on the project began in May 2009 and the first generator was commissioned in April 2013, the last in December 2013. The power station operates by shifting water between an upper and lower reservoir to generate electricity. The lower reservoir was formed with the creation of the Xianyou Lower Dam on the Xikou River, a tributary of the Mulan River. The Xianyou Upper Reservoir is located in a valley above the east side of the lower reservoir on the Dajixi River, another tributary of the Mulan. During periods of low energy demand, such as at night, water is pumped from Xianyou Lower Reservoir up to the upper reservoir. When energy demand is high, the water is released back down to the lower reservoir but the pump turbines that pumped the water up now reverse mode and serve as generators to produce electricity. The process is repeated as necessary and the plant serves as a peaking power plant.

The lower reservoir is created by a 74.9 m (246 ft) tall and 277 m (909 ft) long concrete-face rock-fill dam on the Xikou River. It can withhold up to 17,980,000 m^{3} (14,580 acre⋅ft) of water. The upper reservoir is created by a 72.6 m (238 ft) tall and 340 m (1,120 ft) long concrete-face rock-fill dam on the paralleling Dajixi River. It can withhold up to 17,350,000 m^{3} (14,070 acre⋅ft) of water. Water from the upper reservoir is sent to the 1,200 MW underground power station down near the lower reservoir through four 1,104 m (3,622 ft) long headrace/penstock pipes. The drop in elevation between the upper and lower reservoir affords a hydraulic head (water drop) of 430 m (1,411 ft).

== See also ==
- List of pumped-storage power stations
