= Qingyuan Pumped Storage Power Station =

- Country: China
- Location: Qingyuan, Qingxin District, Guangdong Province
- Coordinates: 23°44′11.07″N 112°51′43.54″E
- Status: Operational
- Construction began: 2008
- Opening date: 2015
- Operator(s): China Southern Power Grid Company

Upper reservoir
- Creates: Qingyuan Upper
- Total capacity: 11,798,000 m^{3} (9,565 acre⋅ft)

Lower reservoir
- Creates: Qingyuan Lower
- Total capacity: 14,953,200 m^{3} (12,122.8 acre⋅ft)

Power Station
- Hydraulic head: 502.7 m (1,649 ft)
- Pump-generators: 4 x 320 MW Francis pump turbines
- Installed capacity: 1,280 MW

The Qingyuan Pumped Storage Power Station (simplified Chinese: 清远抽水蓄能电站; traditional Chinese: 清遠抽水蓄能電站) is a 1,280 MW pumped-storage hydroelectric power station about 20 km (12 mi) northwest of Qingyuan in Qingxin District, Guangdong Province, China. Construction on the project began in October 2008. The upper reservoir began impounding water in March 2013 and the first generator and all four generators were commissioned by 30 November 2015.

The power station operates by shifting water between an upper and lower reservoir to generate electricity. The lower reservoir is located on Qin River and the upper reservoir is located in a valley above the west side of the lower reservoir. During periods of low energy demand, such as at night, water is pumped from Qingyuan Lower Reservoir up to the upper reservoir. When energy demand is high, the water is released back down to the lower reservoir but the pump turbines that pumped the water up now reverse mode and serve as generators to produce electricity. The process is repeated as necessary and the plant serves as a peaking power plant. It is operated by China Southern Power Grid Company. At full load, it can last 9.1 hours of power generation.

== Reservoir ==
The lower reservoir is created by a 75.9 m (249 ft) tall and 279 m (915 ft) long rock-fill dam on the Pan Wen River. It can withhold up to 14,953,200 m^{3} (12,122.8 acre⋅ft) of water, of which 10,580,800 m^{3} (8,578.0 acre⋅ft) can be pumped to the upper reservoir. The upper reservoir is created by a 54 m (177 ft) tall and 214 m (702 ft) long rock-fill dam. It can withhold up to 11,798,000 m^{3} (9,565 acre⋅ft) of water, of which 10,544,600 m^{3} (8,548.6 acre⋅ft) can be used for power production. Water from the upper reservoir is sent to the underground power station down near the lower reservoir through a 1,753 m (5,751 ft) long headrace/penstock pipe. The power station contains four 320 MW Francis pump turbines. The difference in elevation between the upper and lower reservoir affords a hydraulic head (water drop) of 502.7 m (1,649 ft).

== Accidents ==
Six workers were killed while excavating a tunnel on 19 November 2012.

== See also ==
- List of pumped-storage power stations
