= Ingula Pumped Storage Scheme =

Dam in KwaZulu-Natal/Free State, South Africa

- Country: South Africa
- Location: KwaZulu-Natal/Free State
- Coordinates: 28°16′54″S 29°35′08″E
- Status: Operational
- Construction began: 2005
- Opening date: 2017
- Construction cost: US$3.5 billion (R25 billion)
- Owner(s): Eskom and CMC Impregilo Mavundla

Upper reservoir
- Creates: Bedford Reservoir
- Total capacity: 22,400,000 m^{3} (18,200 acre⋅ft)

Lower reservoir
- Creates: Bramhoek Reservoir
- Total capacity: 26,300,000 m^{3} (21,300 acre⋅ft)

Power Station
- Hydraulic head: 480 m (1,570 ft)
- Pump-generators: 4 x 333 megawatts (447,000 hp) reversible Francis-type
- Installed capacity: 1,332 MW

The Ingula Pumped Storage Scheme (previously named Braamhoek) is a pumped-storage power station in the escarpment of the Little Drakensberg range straddling the border of the KwaZulu-Natal and Free State provinces, South Africa. It is about 22 km (14 mi) North-East of Van Reenen.

== Design ==
The pumped-storage hydroelectric scheme consists of an upper and a lower dam 4.6 kilometres (2.9 mi) apart and is connected to a power station by tunnels.

The power station uses 4 Francis pump turbines rated at 333 MW each, giving it a total rating of 1332 MW installed capacity.

== Construction ==
Notable contractors included CMC Impregilo Mavundla Joint Venture and Concor on the dams.

The scheme was built at a cost of US$3.5 billion (R25 billion).

Construction began in 2005 and the power station was scheduled to begin operations in late 2015.

- The first two generators were commissioned March 2016.
- The third generator was brought into commercial operation in August 2016.
- The fourth and final one in January 2017.

== Detailed breakdown ==
The pumped-storage hydroelectric plant uses water from the upper reservoir to generate electricity during the peak demand periods of the day. At night, excess power on the grid generated by conventional coal and nuclear plants is used to pump water to the upper reservoir.

- The upper Bedford Dam on Bedford stream, a tributary of the Wilge River, was completed in April 2011. It is a 39 m (128 ft) tall concrete-face rock-fill dam. It has a 22,400,000 m^{3} (18,200 acre⋅ft) water storage capacity of which 19,200,000 m^{3} (15,600 acre⋅ft) can be used for power generation.
- The lower Bramhoek Dam on Bramhoek stream, a tributary of the Klip River, was completed in November 2011. It is a 41 m (135 ft) tall roller-compacted concrete gravity dam. It has a 26,300,000 m^{3} (21,300 acre⋅ft) water storage capacity of which 21,900,000 m^{3} (17,800 acre⋅ft) can be pumped up to the upper reservoir.
- A 2 km (1.2 mi) long headrace tunnel connects the upper reservoir to the underground power station which houses 4 x 333 megawatts (447,000 hp) reversible Francis pump-turbines. The elevation between the two reservoirs affords a hydraulic head (water drop) of 480 m (1,570 ft).
- Water from the power station is discharged down a 2.5 km (1.6 mi) long tailrace tunnel to the lower reservoir.

== Storage capacity ==
The energy storage capacity is 21,000 MWh or 15.8 generating hours.

== See also ==
- List of power stations in South Africa
- List of pumped-storage hydroelectric power stations
