= List of pumped-storage hydroelectric power stations =

The following page lists all pumped-storage hydroelectric power stations that are larger than 1,000 MW in installed generating capacity, which are currently operational or under construction. Those power stations that are smaller than 1,000 MW, and those that are decommissioned or only at a planning/proposal stage may be found in regional lists, listed at the end of the page.

== List of plants larger than 1000 MW capacity ==
The table below lists currently operational power stations. Some of these may have additional units under construction, but only current installed capacity is listed.

Station	Country	Location	Power capacity (MW)	Storage capacity (MWh)	Ref
Fengning Pumped Storage Power Station	China	41°41′03″N 116°33′12″E	3,600	40,000	
Bath County Pumped Storage Station	United States	38°12′32″N 79°48′00″W	3,003	24,000	
Huizhou Pumped Storage Power Station	China	23°16′07″N 114°18′50″E	2,448		
Guangdong Pumped Storage Power Station	China	23°45′52″N 113°57′12″E	2,400		
Meizhou Pumped Storage Power Station	China	23°23′13″N 115°29′40″E	2,400		
Ludington Pumped Storage Power Plant	United States	43°53′37″N 86°26′43″W	2,172	19,548	
Changlongshan Pumped Storage Power Station	China	30°29′17″N 119°36′30″E	2,100		
Okutataragi Pumped Storage Power Station	Japan	35°14′12″N 134°51′23″E	1,932	15,546	
Tianhuangping Pumped Storage Power Station	China	30°28′13″N 119°36′21″E	1,836		
Tumut-3	Australia	35°36′42″S 148°17′29″E	1,800		
Grand'Maison Dam	France	45°12′21″N 06°07′01″E	1,800	34,800	
Jixi Pumped Storage Power Station	China	30°09′14″N 118°46′01″E	1,800		
Wendeng Pumped Storage Power Station	China	37°12′52″N 121°47′25″E	1,800		
Jinyun Pumped Storage Power Station	China	28°32′01″N 120°10′30″E	1,800		
Dinorwig Power Station	United Kingdom	53°07′07″N 04°06′50″W	1,728	9,100	
Tiantai Pumped Storage Power Station	China	29°10′36″N 121°08′35″E	1,700		
Raccoon Mountain Pumped-Storage Plant	United States	35°02′55″N 85°23′48″W	1,652	36,344	
Mingtan Pumped Storage Hydro Power Plant	Taiwan	23°50′11″N 120°52′04″E	1,602		
Okukiyotsu Pumped Storage Power Station (1 & 2)	Japan	36°50′37.00″N 138°45′58.00″E	1,600		
Castaic Power Plant	United States	34°35′14″N 118°39′23″W	1,566	12,470	
Liyang Pumped Storage Power Station	China	31°14′17″N 119°22′35″E	1,500		
Xianju Pumped Storage Power Station	China	28°38′30″N 120°24′41″E	1,500		
Okumino Pumped Storage Power Station	Japan	35°44′19″N 136°40′15″E	1,500		
Cortes La Muela Power Station	Spain	39°14′20″N 0°55′41″W	1,490	24,496	
Linth-Limmern Pumped Storage Station	Switzerland	46°51′00″N 9°0′03″E	1,480		
Sardar Sarovar Dam	India	21°49′49″N 73°44′50″E	1,450		
Dunhua Pumped Storage Power Station	China	44°00′56″N 128°05′04″E	1,400		
Xiamen Pumped Storage Power Station	China	24°51′33″N 118°10′07″E	1,400		
Zhen'an Pumped Storage Power Station	China	33°31′06″N 108°39′00″E	1,400		
Ninghai Pumped Storage Power Station	China	29°23′57″N 121°35′30″E	1,400		
Shangyi Pumped Storage Power Station	China	40°45′19″N 114°20′53″E	1,400		
Jurong Pumped Storage Power Station	China	32°04′35″N 119°13′35″E	1,350		
Ingula Pumped Storage Scheme	South Africa	28°16′54″S 29°35′08″E	1,332	21,000	
Lushan Pumped Storage Power Station	China		1,300		
Vianden Pumped Storage Plant	Luxembourg	49°57′08″N 6°10′38″E	1,296	4,917	
Dniester Pumped Storage Power Station	Ukraine	48°30′49″N 27°28′24″E	1,296		
Okawachi Pumped Storage Power Station	Japan	35°7′41″N 134°42′53″E	1,280		
Qingyuan Pumped Storage Power Station	China	23°44′29″N 112°51′43″E	1,280	11,520	
Shin Takasegawa Pumped Storage Station	Japan	36°28′26″N 137°41′23″E	1,280		
Hohhot Pumped Storage Power Station	China	40°59′14″N 111°41′18″E	1,224		
Okuyoshino Pumped Storage Power Station	Japan	34°7′4″N 135°49′16″E	1,206	14,689	
Bailianhe Pumped Storage Power Station	China	30°36′33″N 115°27′15″E	1,200		
Baoquan Pumped Storage Power Station	China	35°28′08″N 113°28′24″E	1,200		
Heimifeng Pumped Storage Power Station	China	28°27′35″N 113°00′36″E	1,200		
Helms Pumped Storage Plant	United States	37°02′13.78″N 118°57′53.63″W	1,200		
Hongping Pumped Storage Power Station	China	29°03′35″N 115°18′04″E	1,200		
Kazunogawa Pumped Storage Power Station	Japan	35°43′07″N 138°55′47″E	1,200		
Matanoagawa Dam	Japan	35°14′44″N 133°29′30″E	1,200		
Omarugawa Pumped Storage Power Station	Japan	32°14′52″N 131°22′25″E	1,200		
Pushihe Pumped Storage Power Station	China	40°25′42″N 124°41′50″E	1,200		
Shenzhen Pumped Storage Power Station	China	22°39′16″N 114°15′22″E	1,200		
Tamahara Pumped Storage Power Station	Japan	36°46′56″N 139°03′23″E	1,200		
Tongbai Pumped Storage Power Station	China	29°12′11″N 120°59′50″E	1,200		
Xianyou Pumped Storage Power Station	China	25°31′55″N 118°33′14″E	1,200		
Xilongchi Pumped Storage Power Station	China	38°32′14″N 113°16′24″E	1,200		
Zagorsk Pumped Storage Station	Russia	56°28′55″N 38°11′28″E	1,200		
Yimeng Pumped Storage Power Station	China	35°25′36″N 118°04′48″E	1,200		
Yangjiang Pumped Storage Power Station	China	21°53′40″N 112°22′28″E	1,200		
Huanggou Pumped Storage Power Station	China	45°22′42″N 129°37′44″E	1,200		
Baiyun Pumped Storage Power Station	China	25°59′30″N 118°55′36″E	1,200		
Zhouning Pumped Storage Power Station	China	27°05′30″N 119°24′15″E	1,200		
Jinzhai Pumped Storage Power Station	China	31°24′49″N 116°01′56″E	1,200		
Yongtai Pumped Storage Power Station	China	29° 29.13' N 113° 25.69' E	1,200		
Tianchi Pumped Storage Power Station	China	33°37′45″N 112°12′16″E	1,200		
Panlong Pumped Storage Power Station	China	28°55′25″N 106°28′38″E	1,200		
Fukang Pumped Storage Power Station	China	43°57′09″N 88°25′50″E	1,200		
Nanning Pumped Storage Power Station	China	23°06′01″N 108°34′59″E	1,200		
Yixian Pumped Storage Power Station	China	39°26′19″N 115°16′45″E	1,200		
Qujiang Pumped Storage Power Station	China	28°46′22″N 118°53′33″E	1,200		
Entracque Power Plant	Italy	44°13′29″N 07°23′10″E	1,184	17,040	
Coo-Trois-Ponts Hydroelectric Power Station	Belgium	50°23′12″N 05°51′26″E	1,164	5,820	
Blenheim-Gilboa Hydroelectric Power Station	United States	42°27′18″N 74°27′29″W	1,160	17,400	
Presa de Aldeadávila	Spain	41°12′42″N 6°41′08″W	1,142		
Okuyahagi Pumped Storage Power Station	Japan	35°13′56″N 137°25′43″W	1,125		
Shintoyone Pumped Storage Power Station	Japan	35°07′33″N 137°45′38″E	1,125		
Rocky Mountain Hydroelectric Plant	United States	34°21′20″N 85°18′14″W	1,095		
Northfield Mountain	United States	42°36′36.51″N 72°26′50.63″W	1,168	8,482	
Muddy Run Pumped Storage Facility	United States	39°48′29″N 76°17′54″W	1,071		
Bad Creek Hydroelectric Station	United States	35°0′40.02″N 83°0′52.23″W	1,065	25,560	
Goldisthal Pumped Storage Station	Germany	50°30′26″N 11°00′18″E	1,060	8,480	
Imaichi Pumped Storage Plant	Japan	36°49′31″N 139°39′58″E	1,050	7,528	
Markersbach Pumped Storage Power Plant	Germany	50°31′14″N 12°52′57″E	1,045	4,200	
Siah Bishe Pumped Storage Power Plant	Iran	36°13′04″N 51°18′18″E	1,040		
Roncovalgrande Hydroelectric Plant	Italy	46°04′10″N 8°43′55″E	1,016	17,680	
Minghu Pumped Storage Hydro Power Station	Taiwan	23°51′16″N 120°52′13″E	1,008		
Presenzano Hydroelectric Plant	Italy	41°22′53″N 14°5′25″E	1,005	7,000	
Drakensberg Pumped Storage Scheme	South Africa	28°34′23″S 29°05′13″E	1,000	27,600	
Edolo Pumped Storage Plant	Italy	46°10′15″N 10°20′52″E	1,000	4,890	
Shimogo Pumped Storage Power Station	Japan	37°20′42″N 139°54′30″E	1,000		
Tai'an Pumped Storage Power Station	China	36°13′19″N 117°02′31″E	1,000		
Xiangshuijian Pumped Storage Power Station	China	31°06′46″N 118°17′31″E	1,000		
Yangyang Pumped Storage Power Station	South Korea	38°00′37″N 128°32′34″E	1,000		
Yixing Pumped Storage Power Station	China	31°18′55″N 119°45′37″E	1,000		
Zhanghewan Pumped Storage Power Station	China	37°46′28″N 114°03′30″E	1,000		
Wuyue Pumped Storage Power Station	China	31°50′21″N 114°35′35″E	1,000		

=== Under construction ===
This table lists future 1,000 MW or larger stations that are under construction; some may be partially operational with a current installed capacity under 1,000 MW.

Station	Country	Location	Capacity (MW)	Storage capacity (MWh)	Expected completion	Ref
Kannagawa Hydropower Plant	Japan	36°00′18″N 138°39′09″E	2,820		2032	
Warang Pumped Storage Power Station	China		2,800			
Anhua Pumped Storage Power Station	China	28°07′59″N 111°46′45″E	2,400		2028	
Jiande Pumped Storage Power Station	China	28°07′59″N 111°46′45″E	2,400		2029	
Nanshankou Pumped Storage Power Station	China		2,400			
Tongde Pumped Storage Power Station	China		2,400			
Snowy 2.0 Pumped Storage Power Station	Australia	35°46′53″S 148°27′13″E	2,200	350,000	2027	
Jiufengshan Pumped Storage Power Station	China		2,100			
Huanglong Pumped Storage Power Station	China		2,100			
Ruoqiang Pumped Storage Power Station	China		2,100			
Hejing Pumped Storage Power Station	China		2,100			
Daofu Pumped Storage Power Station	China		2,100			
Liaoning Qingyuan Pumped Storage Power Station	China	42°07′56″N 124°40′56″E	1,800		2025	
Tai'an-2 Pumped Storage Power Station	China	36°02′54″N 117°17′43″E	1,800		2029	
Songxian Pumped Storage Power Station	China		1,800		2029	
Yunxiao Pumped Storage Power Station	China	24°02′46″N 117°21′46″E	1,800		2029	
Guanghanping Pumped Storage Power Station	China	27°18′33″N 113°40′45″E	1,800		2029	
Nanzhang Pumped Storage Power Station	China		1,800			
Hongping Pumped Storage Power Station phase 2	China		1,800			
Taizihe Pumped Storage Power Station phase 2	China		1,800			
Helong Pumped Storage Power Station	China		1,800			
Jiantang Pumped Storage Power Station	China		1,800			
Dayahe Pumped Storage Power Station	China	41°08′20″N 125°00′50″E	1,600		2030	
Guilin Pumped Storage Power Station	China		1,600			
Hunyuan Pumped Storage Power Station	China	39°34′19″N 113°36′21″E	1,500		2028	
Guiyang Pumped Storage Power Station	China		1,500			
Qiannan Pumped Storage Power Station	China		1,500			
Luoning Pumped Storage Power Station	China	34°17′44″N 111°46′23″E	1,400		2026	
Pingjiang Pumped Storage Power Station	China	28°28′48″N 113°45′28″E	1,400		2025	
Pingtanyuan Pumped Storage Power Station	China	31°05′07″N 115°34′15″E	1,400		2028	
Shangshe Pumped Storage Power Station	China		1,400			
Xilongchi-2 Pumped Storage Power Station	China	38°32′14″N 113°16′24″E	1,400			
Pandaoshan Pumped Storage Power Station	China		1,400			
Huangcheng Pumped Storage Power Station	China		1,400			
Jingning Pumped Storage Power Station	China		1,400			
Ziyunshan Pumped Storage Power Station	China		1,400		2028	
Tonglu Pumped Storage Power Station	China		1,400		2028	
Lingshou Pumped Storage Power Station	China		1,400		2027	
Tongshan Pumped Storage Power Station	China		1,400		2030	
Huangyang Pumped Storage Power Station	China		1,400			
Buerjin Pumped Storage Power Station	China		1,400			
Liziwan Pumped Storage Power Station	China		1,400			
Wanshuiyuan Pumped Storage Power Station	China		1,400			
Songyang Pumped Storage Power Station	China		1,400		2028	
Shahe Pumped Storage Power Station	China		1,400			
Foping Pumped Storage Power Station	China		1,400			
Mulan Pumped Storage Power Station	China		1,400			
Hua'an Pumped Storage Power Station	China		1,400			
Fumin Pumped Storage Power Station	China		1,400			
Tianzishan Pumped Storage Power Station	China		1,400			
Jiapeng Pumped Storage Power Station	China		1,400		2030	
Hezhou Pumped Storage Power Station	China		1,400			
Pinnapuram Pumped Storage Plant	India	15°36′42″N 78°15′10″E	1,680		2023	
Tongcheng Pumped Storage Power Station	China		1,280		2026	
Funing Pumped Storage Power Station	China	40°04′59″N 119°21′09″E	1,200		2027	
Jiaohe Pumped Storage Power Station	China	43°26′45″N 127°32′30″E	1,200		2026	
Weifang Pumped Storage Power Station	China	36°22′10″N 118°18′30″E	1,200		2026	
Hami Pumped Storage Power Station	China	43°08′41″N 93°55′55″E	1,200		2026	
Zhirui Pumped Storage Power Station	China	42°52′45″N 117°48′36″E	1,200		2025	
Yuanqu Pumped Storage Power Station	China	35°03′45″N 111°39′04″E	1,200		2028	
Yuanqu Pumped Storage Power Station phase 2	China		1,200			
Pan'an Pumped Storage Power Station	China	28°59′12″N 120°35′39″E	1,200		2028	
Taishun Pumped Storage Power Station	China		1,200		2030	
Fengxin Pumped Storage Power Station	China		1,200		2030	
Wuhai Pumped Storage Power Station	China		1,200		2028	
Shangzhi Pumped Storage Power Station	China		1,200		2029	
Qinshui Pumped Storage Power Station	China		1,200			
Shuiyuanshan Pumped Storage Power Station	China		1,200			
Jiaohe Pumped Storage Power Station	China	43°26′48″N 127°33′29″E	1,200		2029	
Qingjiang Pumped Storage Power Station	China		1,200		2028	
Yuan'an Pumped Storage Power Station	China		1,200		2029	
Jianquan Pumped Storage Power Station	China	31°08′25″N 108°41′01″E	1,200			
Yanling Pumped Storage Power Station	China		1,200			
Muwangxi Pumped Storage Power Station	China		1,200			
Gongshang Pumped Storage Power Station	China		1,200			
Langjiang Pumped Storage Power Station	China	23°27′59″N 112°18′26″E	1,200			
Yongjia Pumped Storage Power Station	China		1,200		2028	
Luanping Pumped Storage Power Station	China		1,200			
Zhongdong Pumped Storage Power Station	China		1,200			
Yong'an Pumped Storage Power Station	China		1,200			
Xingtai Pumped Storage Power Station	China		1,200			
Lianghekou Pumped Storage Power Station	China		1,200			
Songzi Pumped Storage Power Station	China		1,200			
Yumen Pumped Storage Power Station	China		1,200			
Xingcheng Pumped Storage Power Station	China		1,200		2030	
Miluo Pumped Storage Power Station	China		1,200			
Caiziba Pumped Storage Power Station	China		1,200			
Qingyuan Pumped Storage Power Station	China		1,200		2025	
Yongchang Pumped Storage Power Station	China		1,200			
Shitai Pumped Storage Power Station	China		1,200			
Yong'an Pumped Storage Power Station	China		1,200			
Puxian Pumped Storage Power Station	China		1,200			
Chengxi Pumped Storage Power Station	China		1,200		2028	
Laibin Pumped Storage Power Station	China		1,200			
Yuexi Pumped Storage Power Station	China		1,200			
Qingtian Pumped Storage Power Station	China		1,200			
Lufeng Pumped Storage Power Station	China		1,200			
Guanyang Pumped Storage Power Station	China		1,200		2029	
Qinzhou Pumped Storage Power Station	China		1,200		2029	
Guigang Pumped Storage Power Station	China		1,200		2029	
Yulin Pumped Storage Power Station	China		1,200		2029	
Dianbai Pumped Storage Power Station	China		1,200		2029	
Longtan Pumped Storage Power Station	China		1,200		2031	
Lingbao Pumped Storage Power Station	China		1,200			
Jiangshan Pumped Storage Power Station	China		1,200			
Yabuli Pumped Storage Power Station	China		1,200		2029	
Shanyang Pumped Storage Power Station	China		1,200		2030	
Kecheng Pumped Storage Power Station	China		1,200			
Zhangping Pumped Storage Power Station	China		1,200			
Tiandong Pumped Storage Power Station	China		1,200			
Dehua Pumped Storage Power Station	China		1,200			
Lianyungang Pumped Storage Power Station	China		1,200			
Xunwu Pumped Storage Power Station	China		1,200			
Ganxian Pumped Storage Power Station	China		1,200		2029	
Nan'an Pumped Storage Power Station	China		1,200		2031	
Meidai Pumped Storage Power Station	China		1,200			
Housihe Pumped Storage Power Station	China		1,200			
Muwangxi Pumped Storage Power Station	China		1,200			
Yinpan Pumped Storage Power Station	China		1,200			
Xichou Pumped Storage Power Station	China		1,200			
Upper Cisokan Pumped Storage Power Plant	Indonesia	6°56′52″S 107°13′07″E	1,040		2025	
Kruonis Pumped Storage Plant	Lithuania	54°47′56″N 24°14′51″E	1,010		2025	
Tehri Pumped Storage Power Station	India	30°22′40″N 78°28′50″E	1,000		2025	
Zhuanghe Pumped Storage Power Station	China		1,000		2027	
Qianxi Pumped Storage Power Station	China		1,000		2030	
Niushoushan Pumped Storage Power Station	China		1,000		2030	

== Gallery ==
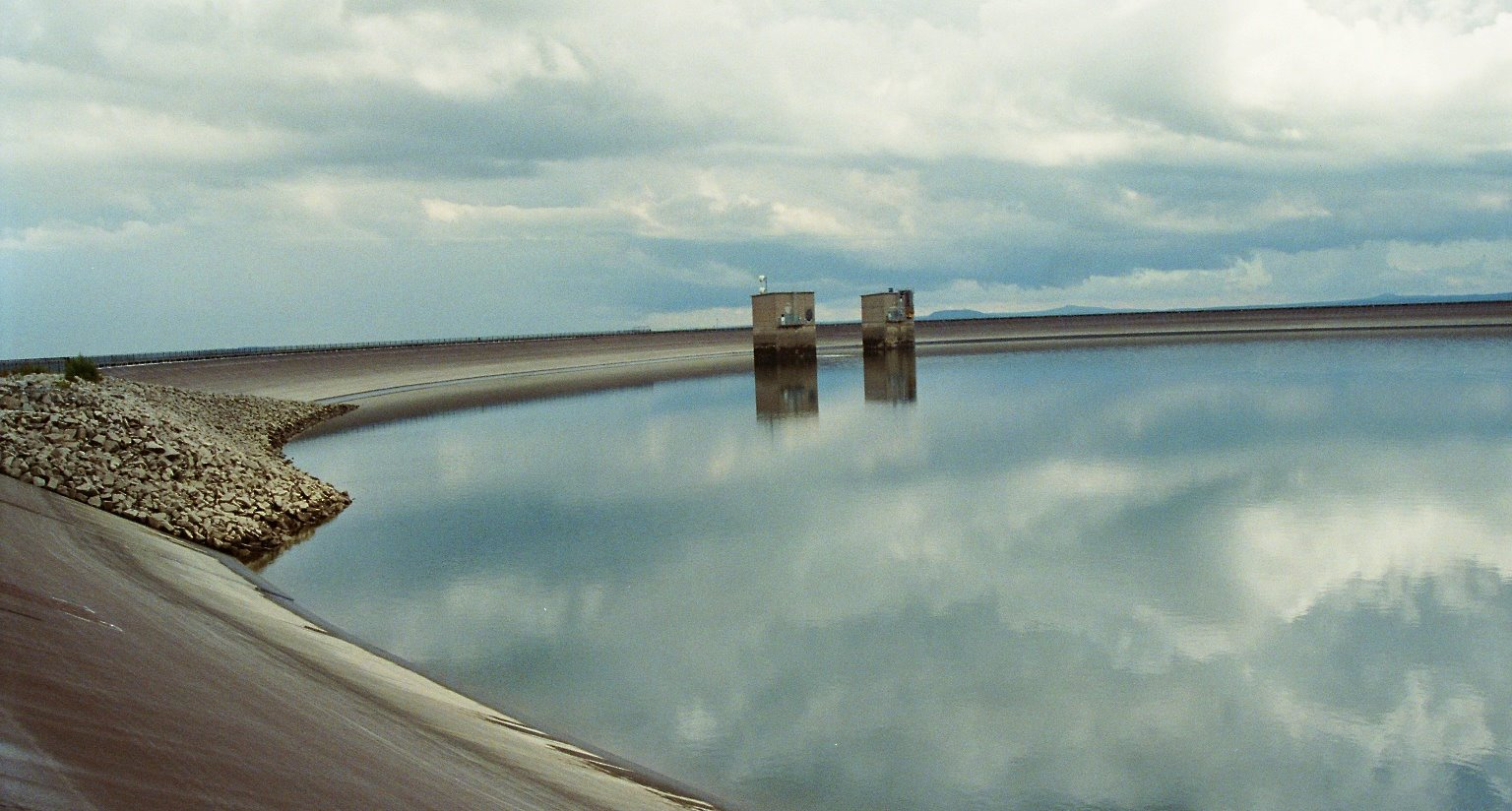
The upper reservoir of the Markersbach PSPS

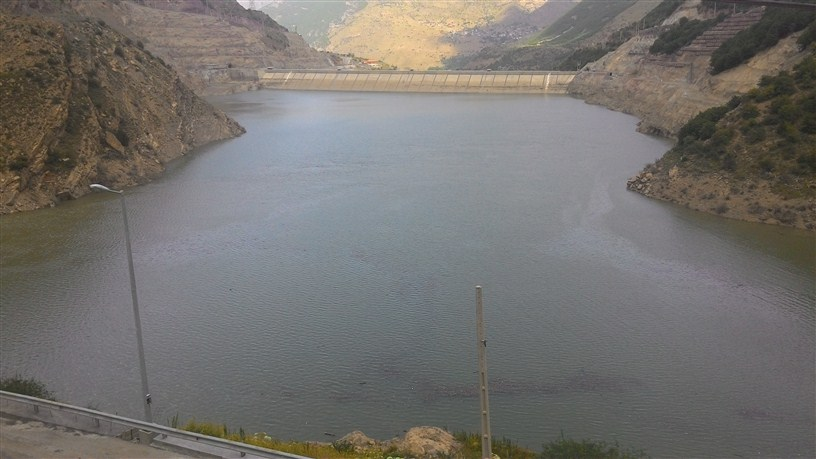
Dam of Siah Bishe Pumped Storage Power Plant

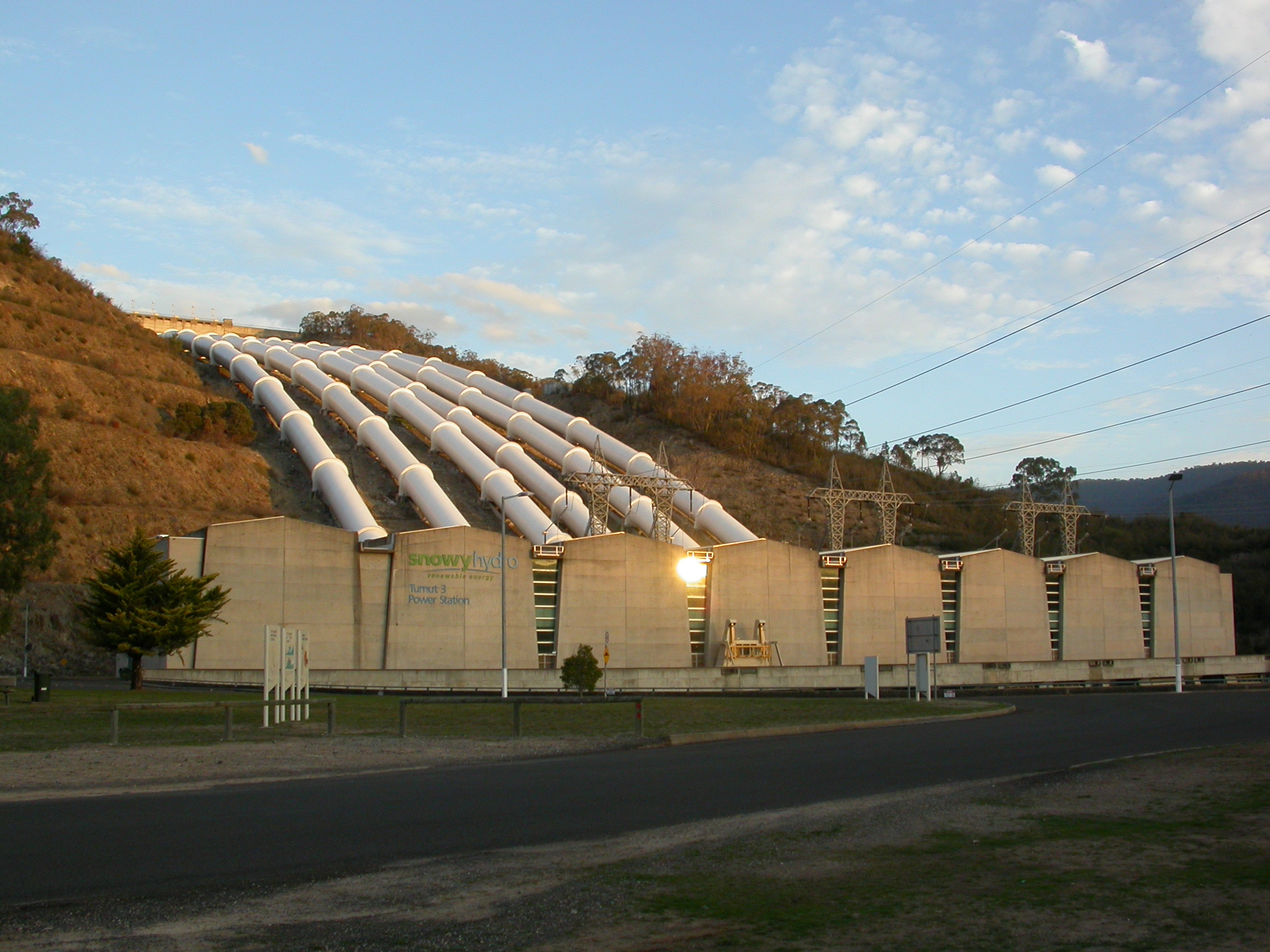
The Tumut-3 Hydroelectric Power Station

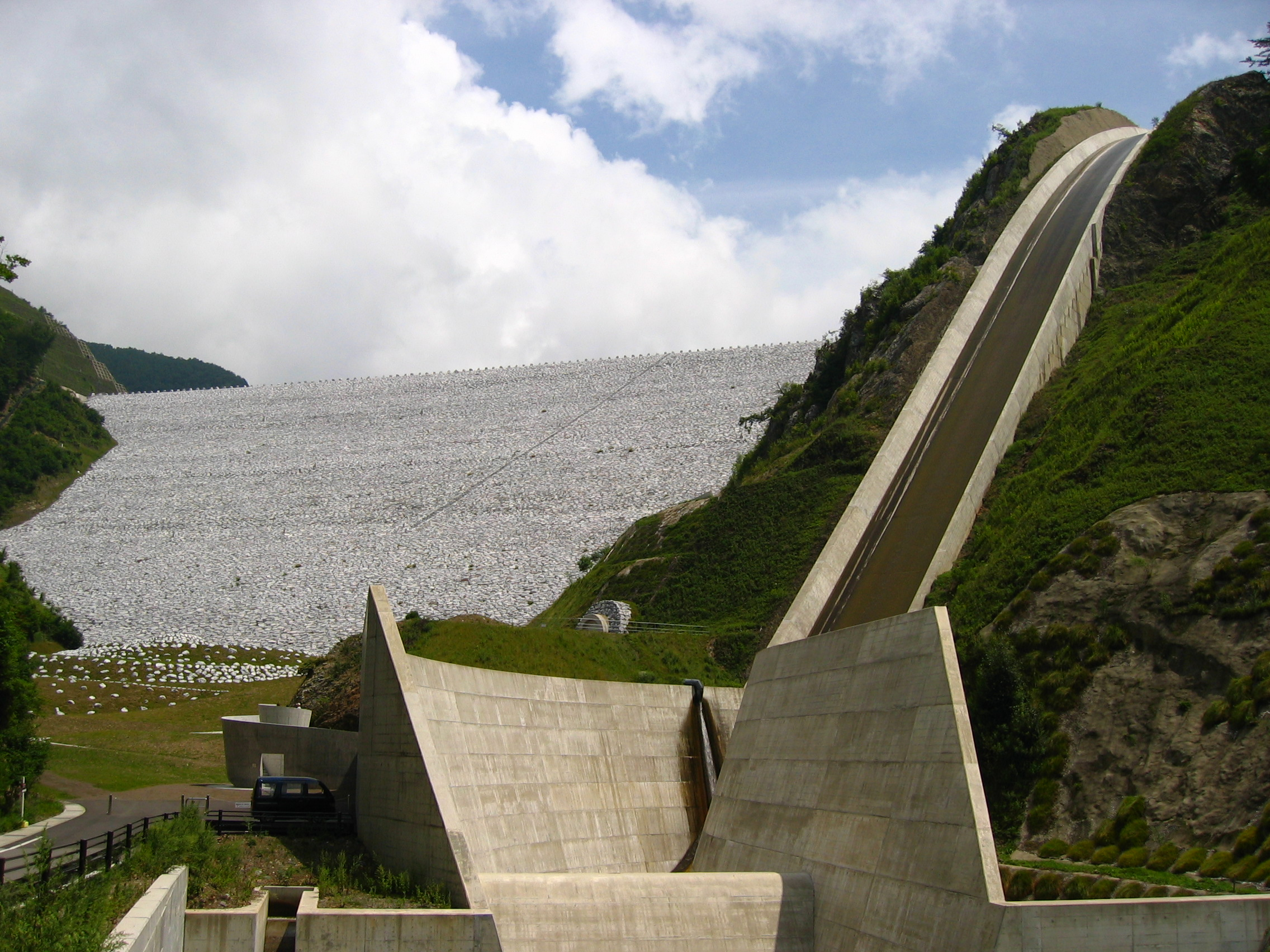
The upper Minamiaiki Dam of the Kannagawa Hydropower Plant

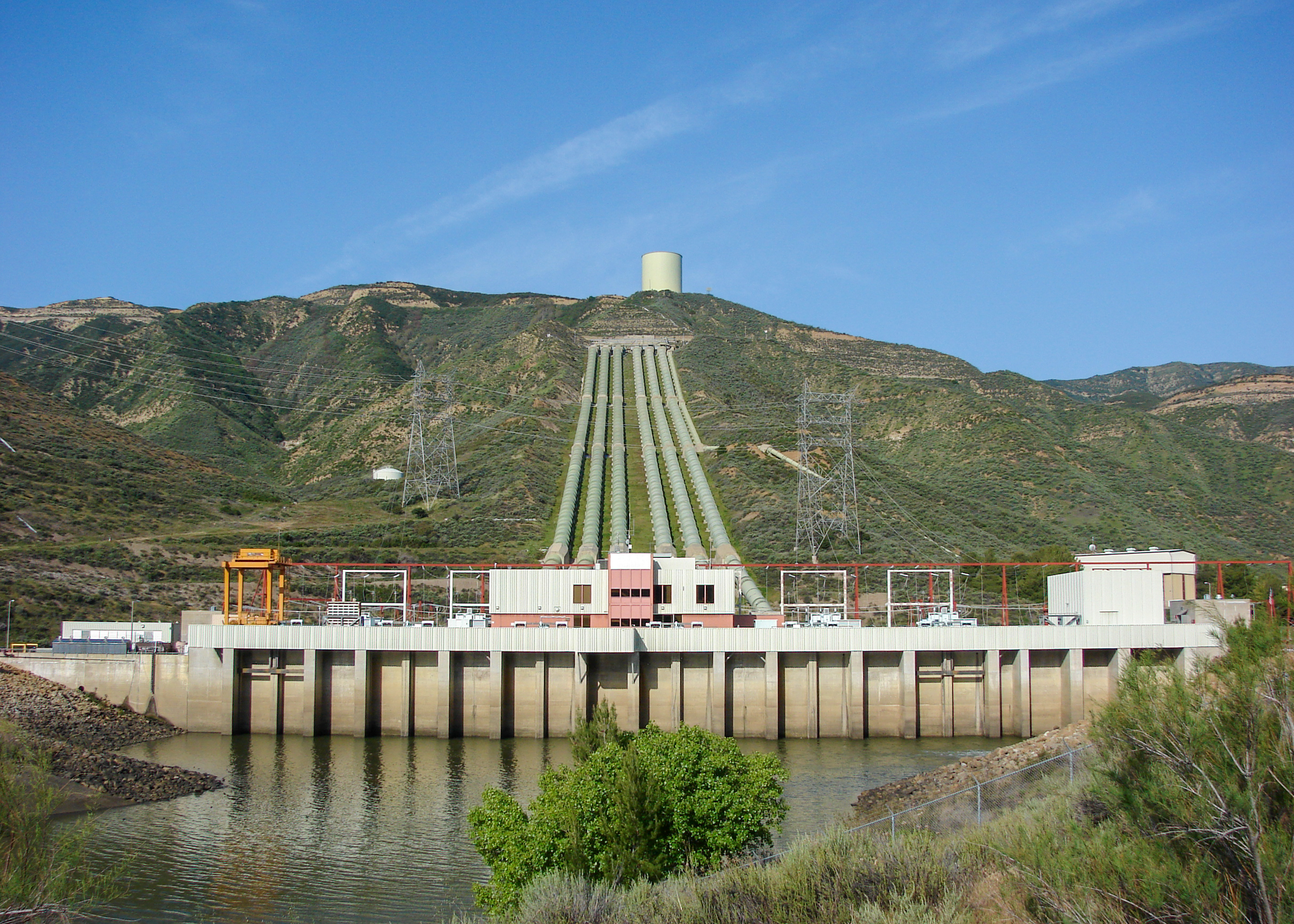
Castaic Power Plant

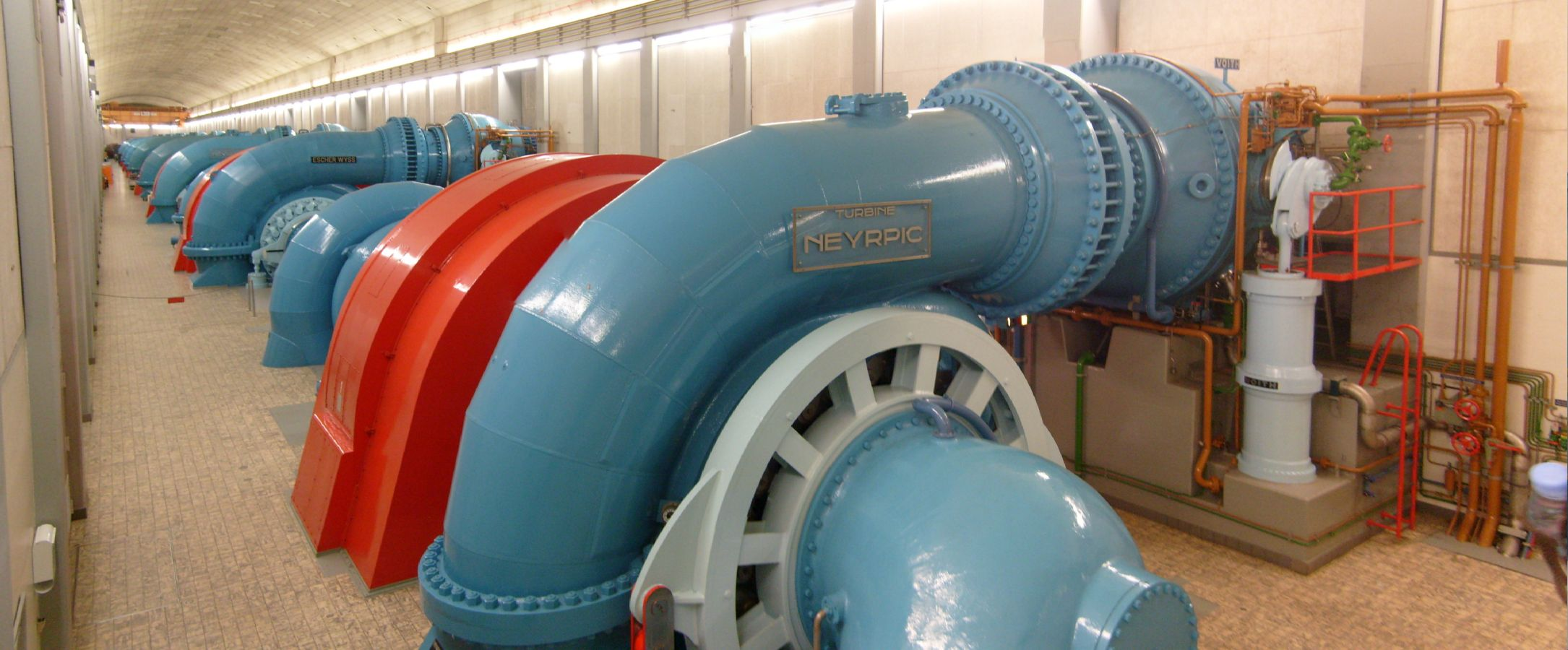
Main pump-generator hall of Vianden Pumped Storage Plant

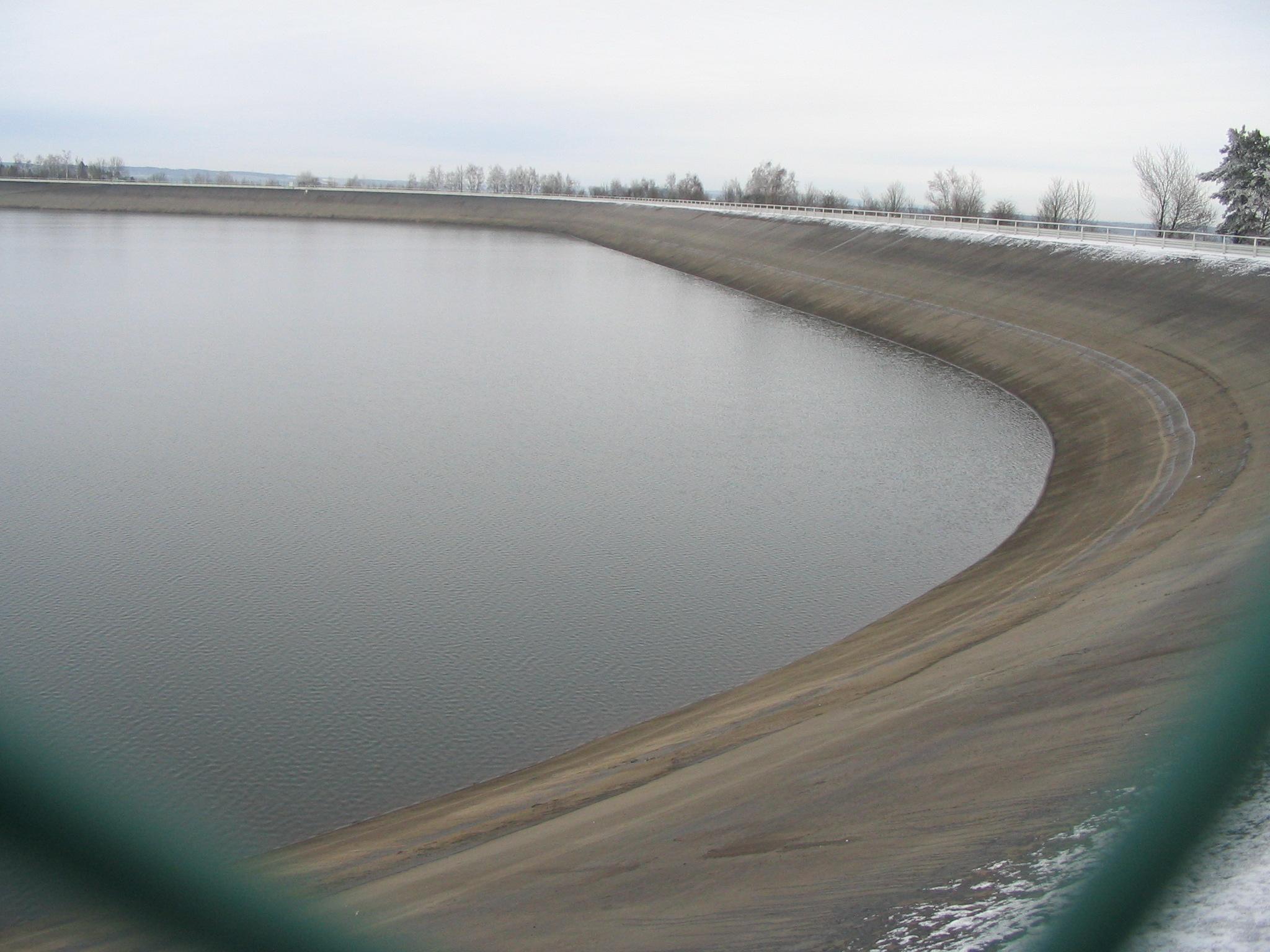
Upper reservoir for Coo-Trois-Ponts PSPS

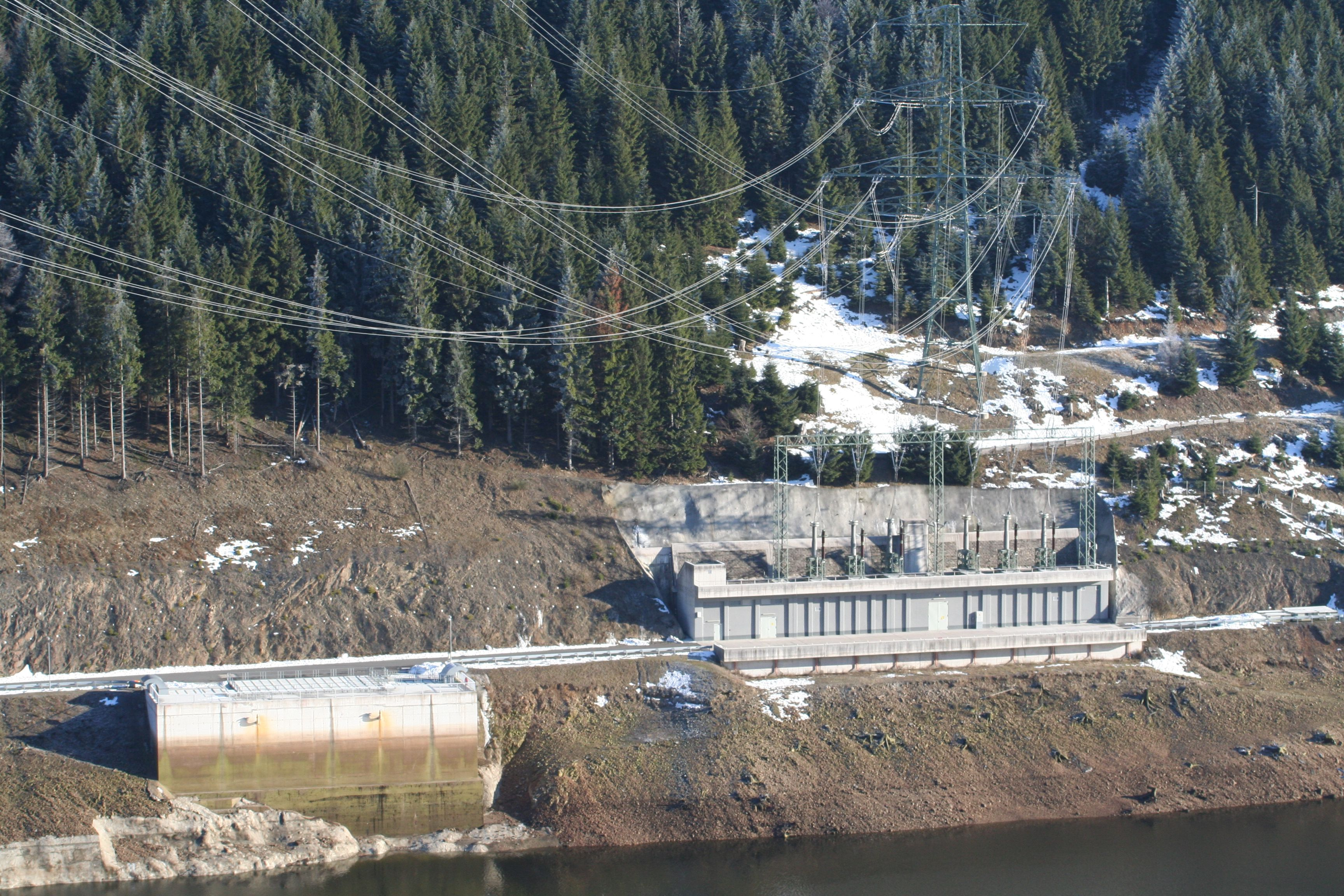
Goldisthal Pumped Storage Station

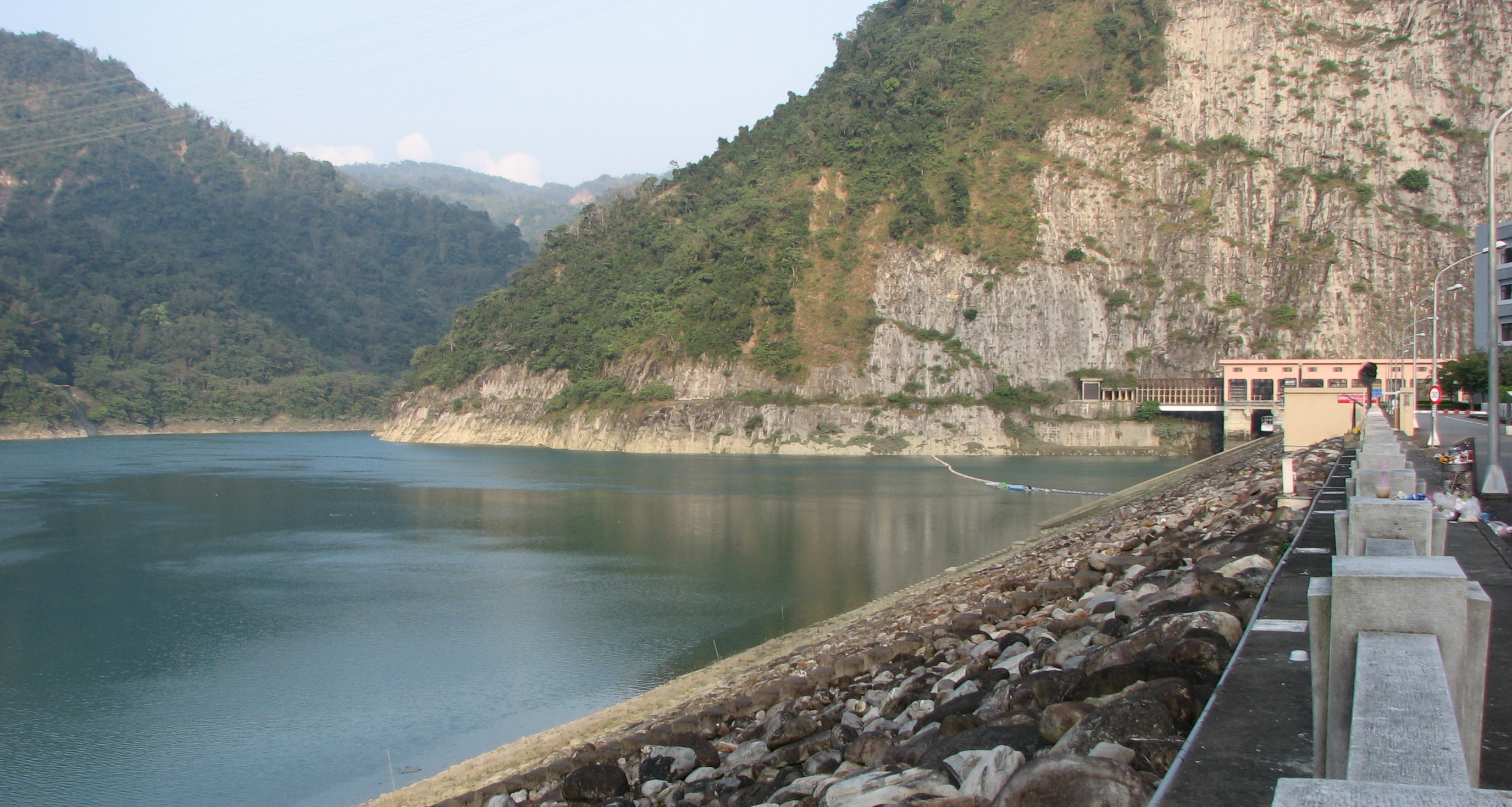
Mingtan Dam

== See also ==
- List of energy storage projects
- List of hydroelectric power station failures
- List of long-duration energy storage
- Lists of hydroelectric power stations
- List of largest power stations
- Pumped-storage facilities in the United States
- United States Department of Energy Global Energy Storage Database
