= Liyang Pumped Storage Power Station =

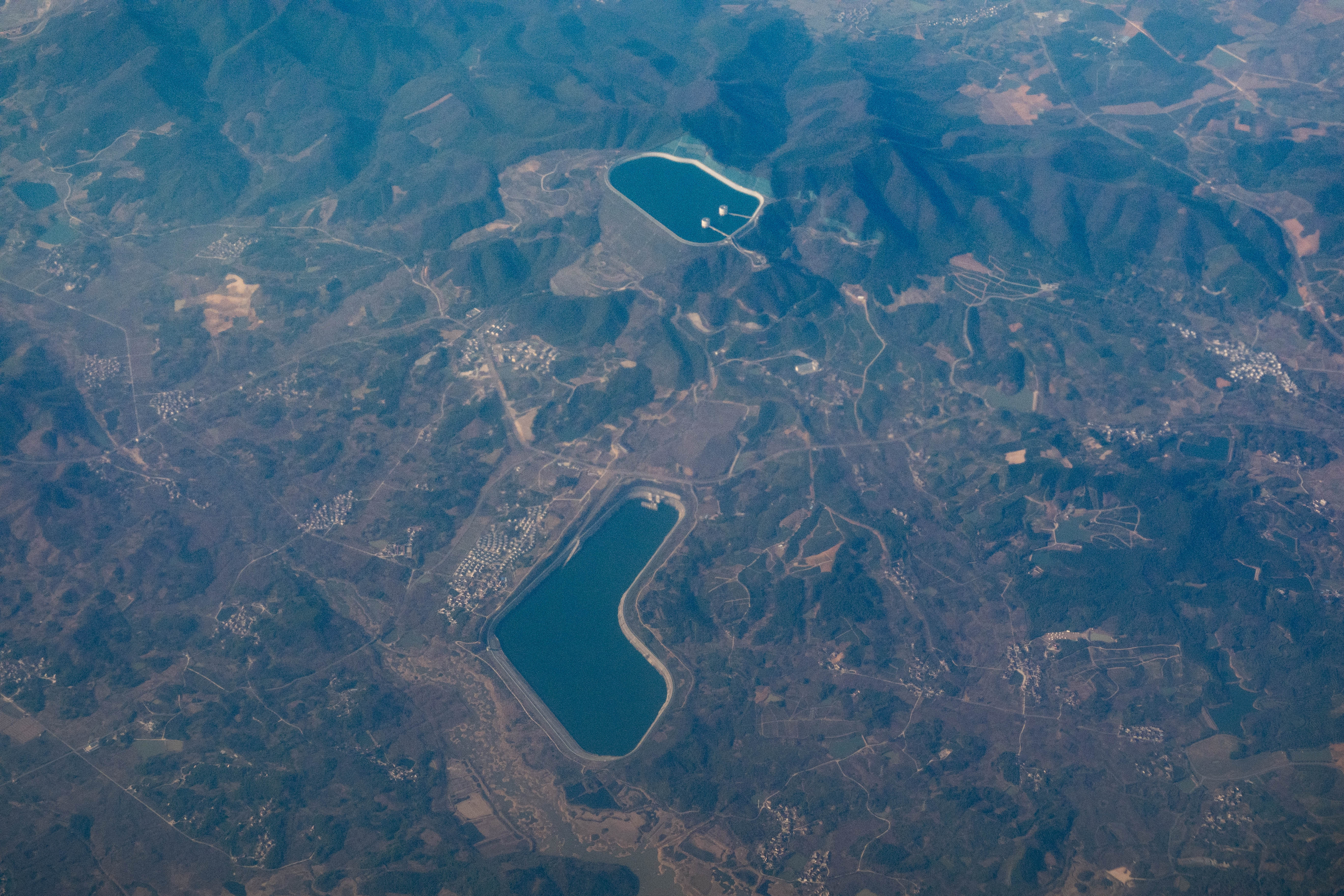
- Official name: 溧陽抽水蓄能電站
- Coordinates: 31°14′17″N 119°22′35″E
- Construction began: 2011
- Opening date: 2017
- Construction cost: CNY¥ 7.64 billion (US$1.2 billion)

Upper reservoir
- Creates: Liyang Upper
- Total capacity: 14,105,000 m^{3} (11,435 acre⋅ft)

Lower reservoir
- Creates: Shahe Reservoir

Power Station
- Pump-generators: 6 x 250 MW Francis pump-turbines
- Installed capacity: 1,500 MW
- Annual generation: 2.007 billion kWh

The Liyang Pumped Storage Power Station (simplified Chinese: 溧阳抽水蓄能电站; traditional Chinese: 溧陽抽水蓄能電站) is a pumped-storage hydroelectric power station 22 km (14 mi) south of Liyang in Jiangsu Province, eastern China. Preliminary construction began in 2002 and major works started in May 2011. The first unit of the power station was commissioned in 2017, the power station will have an installed capacity of 1,500 MW.

As a pumped-storage scheme, the power station shifts water between an upper and a lower reservoir. During periods of low energy demand, when electricity is cheap, the power plant can pump water from the lower reservoir to the upper. When energy demand is high, water is released back down to the power station to produce electricity. The power station will contain six 250 MW reversible Francis pump-turbines which serve to both pump water and generate electricity. The upper reservoir will be formed by a 165 m (541 ft) tall concrete-face rock-fill dam and withhold 14,105,000 m^{3} (11,435 acre⋅ft) of water. Of that capacity, 12,100,000 m^{3} (9,810 acre⋅ft) is active (or usable) storage for power generation. The lower reservoir will be formed adjacent to the Shahe Reservoir with a series of dikes. The power station will generation an estimated 2.007 billion kWh annually and consume 2.676 billion kWh when pumping. Although the power station will consume more energy than it will produce, it is economical because pumping occurs when electricity is cheaper.

== See also ==
- List of pumped-storage hydroelectric power stations
