= Okumino Pumped Storage Power Station =

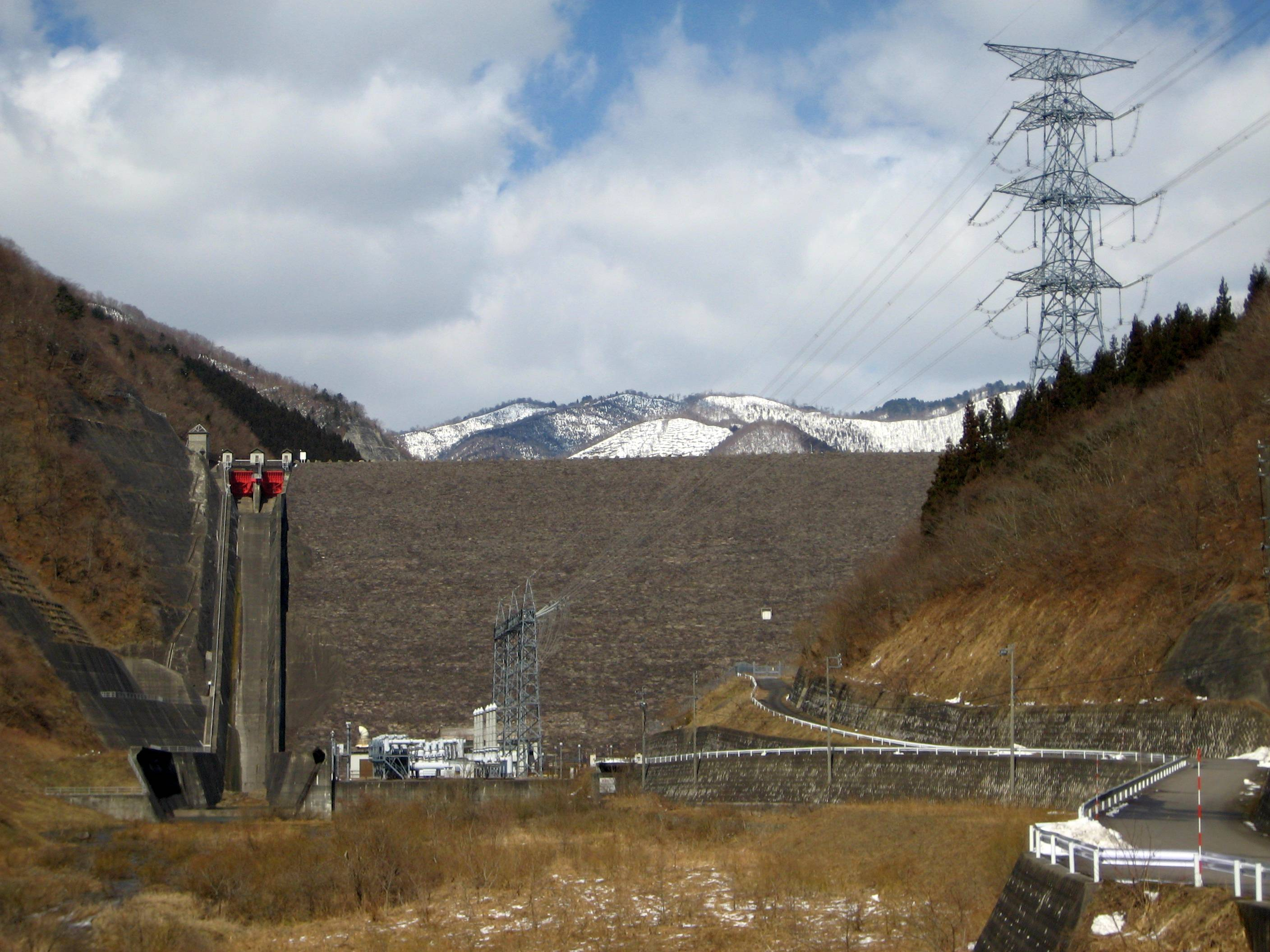
- Kamiosu-demningen, et reservoar for Okumino pumpekraftverk.
- Country: Japan
- Location: Motosu, Gifu
- Coordinates: 35.735374°N 136.661193°E
- Status: Operational
- Operator: Chubu Electric Power Company

Power generation
- Nameplate capacity: 1500 MW

External links
- Commons: Related media on Commons

The Okumino Pumped Storage Power Station is a pumped-storage hydroelectric power station in Motosu in Gifu Prefecture, Japan. The station has an installed capacity of 1,500 megawatts (2,000,000 hp).

== See also ==
- Kamiōsu Dam
- List of pumped-storage hydroelectric power stations
- Hydroelectricity in Japan
