= Electrabel =

Belgian energy company

Electrabel SA
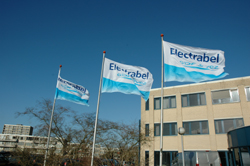
- Type: S.A.
- Industry: Energy
- Founded: 1905
- Headquarters: Brussels, Belgium
- Key people: Isabelle Kocher, Chairman; Philippe Van Troeye, CEO
- Products: Electricity natural gas
- Revenue: €22.2 billion (2017)
- Net income: €4.1 billion (2017)
- Number of employees: 4,302 (2017)
- Parent: Engie S.A.
- Website: Electrabel.com

Electrabel SA is a Belgian energy corporation. It is a subsidiary of French multinational utility company Engie S.A. (formerly GDF Suez).

== History ==
Electrabel was established in 1905. Its actual name originates from 1990, after the regrouping of the companies Intercom, EBES and Unerg.

For a long time a majority stake in Electrabel was held by the French company Suez. In 2005, Suez increased its stake to 96.7% and a squeeze-out of the remaining shareholders was completed on 10 July 2007, when the company was delisted from the stock exchange. Following Suez's 2008 merger with Gaz de France, Electrabel became a subsidiary of GDF Suez, which changed its name into Engie in 2015.

== Operations ==
Electrabel is active in the Benelux market. It generates electricity and heat, and supplies electricity and natural gas to six million customers. In 2008, Electrabel sold 97.4 TWh of electricity and 72 TWh of natural gas. It is the largest electricity producer in the Netherlands and Belgium, the largest electricity supplier in Belgium, and the second largest natural gas supplier in Belgium.

=== Power stations ===
Electrabel has diversified generating facilities of 16,000 MW in the Benelux, including renewable energy sources, natural gas and coal, pumped storage power stations and nuclear power stations. It owns the Doel and Tihange nuclear power plants with a capacity of 2,736.9 MW and 2,423.1 MW respectively. In addition, Electrabel owns combined cycle gas turbine plants in Amercoeur, Drogenbos, Herdersbrug, Saint-Ghislain, Esch-sur-Alzette and Eems, and combined heat and power in Solvay, Total and Almere. Conventional power stations are located in Awirs, Amercoeur, Rodenhuize, Gelderland, Bergum and Dunamenti (Hungary). Electrabel also owns the Coo-Trois-Ponts Hydroelectric Power Station with a total capacity of 1,164 MW and several hydroelectric, photovoltaic and biomass power plants and wind farms.

=== Synatom ===
A wholly owned subsidiary of Electrabel, the company is responsible for the fuel supply and spent fuel management of nuclear reactors in Belgium.
