= Upper Cisokan Pumped Storage Power Plant =

- Interactive map of Upper Cisokan Pumped Storage Power Plant
- Official name: Upper Cisokan Pumped Storage Hydro Electric Power Plant
- Country: Indonesia
- Location: West Java
- Coordinates: 6°56′52″S 107°13′07″E
- Status: Proposed
- Opening date: 2025 (est.)
- Construction cost: US$800 million
- Owner: Perusahaan Listrik Negara

Upper reservoir
- Creates: Cirumamis Reservoir
- Total capacity: 14,000,000 m^{3} (11,350 acre⋅ft)

Lower reservoir
- Creates: Cisokan Reservoir
- Total capacity: 63,000,000 m^{3} (51,075 acre⋅ft)

Power Station
- Hydraulic head: 276 m (906 ft)
- Pump-generators: 4 x 260 MW (275 MW in pump-mode) Francis pump-turbines
- Installed capacity: 1,040 MW

The Upper Cisokan Pumped Storage Plant is a proposed pumped-storage hydropower facility in Indonesia, due for completion by 2025.

The pant will be located 40 km (25 mi) west of Bandung in West Java, Indonesia, and its two reservoirs will occupy area in West Bandung Regency and Cianjur Regency. It will have an installed capacity of 1,040 MW and will be Indonesia's first pumped-storage power plant.

== Background ==
Studies for the project were carried out in the 1990s and a detailed design was completed in 2002. A World Bank loan for the project was approved in May 2011 and signed in November. The West Java government approved the project in October 2011. Preliminary construction such as access road building began in early 2014. The first generator was then expected to be operational by 2019.

However, the project has been delayed and the loan was cancelled in May 2017. Construction did not start partly due to the occurrence of landslides. The access road has been built but is considered unsafe. In 2019, a new loan agreement with the World bank was found, and the facility was expected to become operational by 2025, according to Indonesia's Electricity Supply Business Plan.

Of the project's US$800 million cost, US$650 million is being provided by the World Bank. The remaining US$150 million is to be supplied by the project owner Perusahaan Listrik Negara.

== Design and operation ==
The power plant will operate by shifting water between two reservoirs; the lower reservoir on the Upper Cisokan River (a branch of the Citarum River), and the upper reservoir on the Cirumamis River which is a right-bank tributary of the former. When energy demand is high, water from the upper reservoir is sent to the power plant to produce electricity. When energy demand is low, water is pumped from the lower reservoir to the upper by the same pump-generators. This process repeats as needed and allows the plant to serve as a peaking power plant.

Both reservoirs will be formed by concrete gravity dams using roller-compacted concrete. Each will have an overflow spillway at the center of their center. The upper reservoir's dam will be 75.5 m (248 ft) tall and 375 m (1,230 ft) long while the lower reservoir dam will be 98 m (322 ft) high and 294 m (965 ft) in length. The lower reservoir dam will trap water from a 355 km^{2} (137 mi^{2}) catchment area to create a lake with a gross storage capacity of 63,000,000 m^{3} (51,075 acre⋅ft). Of the total capacity, 10,000,000 m^{3} (8,107 acre⋅ft) can be used for pumping up to the upper reservoir. The surface area of the lower reservoir will be 260 ha (1 mi^{2}). The upper reservoir dam will trap water from a much smaller catchment area, 10.5 km^{2} (4 mi^{2}), to create its reservoir with a gross storage capacity of 14,000,000 m^{3} (11,350 acre⋅ft) and surface area of 80 ha (0 mi^{2}). Of that capacity, 10,000,000 m^{3} (8,107 acre⋅ft) is active (or usable) storage for power generation.

The power plant will be located underground near the lower reservoir. Connecting the upper reservoir and the power plant will first be two headrace tunnels, one 1,220 m (4,003 ft) long and the other 1,160 m (3,806 ft) in length. Surge tanks on each headrace tunnel help prevent water hammer. Each headrace tunnel connects to a steel-lined penstock, each of which later bifurcates into two penstocks. Each of these four penstocks will supply water to the turbines during power generation. After power generation the water will be discharged into the lower reservoir via four tailrace tunnels. When pumping water moves through the same conduits back to the upper reservoir. The power plant will contain four Francis pump-turbines which are rated at 260 MW each for power generation and 275 MW for pumping. The upper reservoir will lie at maximum elevation of 796 m (2,612 ft) and the lower at 499 m (1,637 ft). This difference in elevation will afford the power plant a rated hydraulic head of 276 m (906 ft).

== See also ==
- List of power stations in Indonesia
- List of pumped-storage hydroelectric power stations
