= Kazunogawa Pumped Storage Power Station =

Pumped-storage hydroelectric power station in Yamanashi Prefecture, Japan

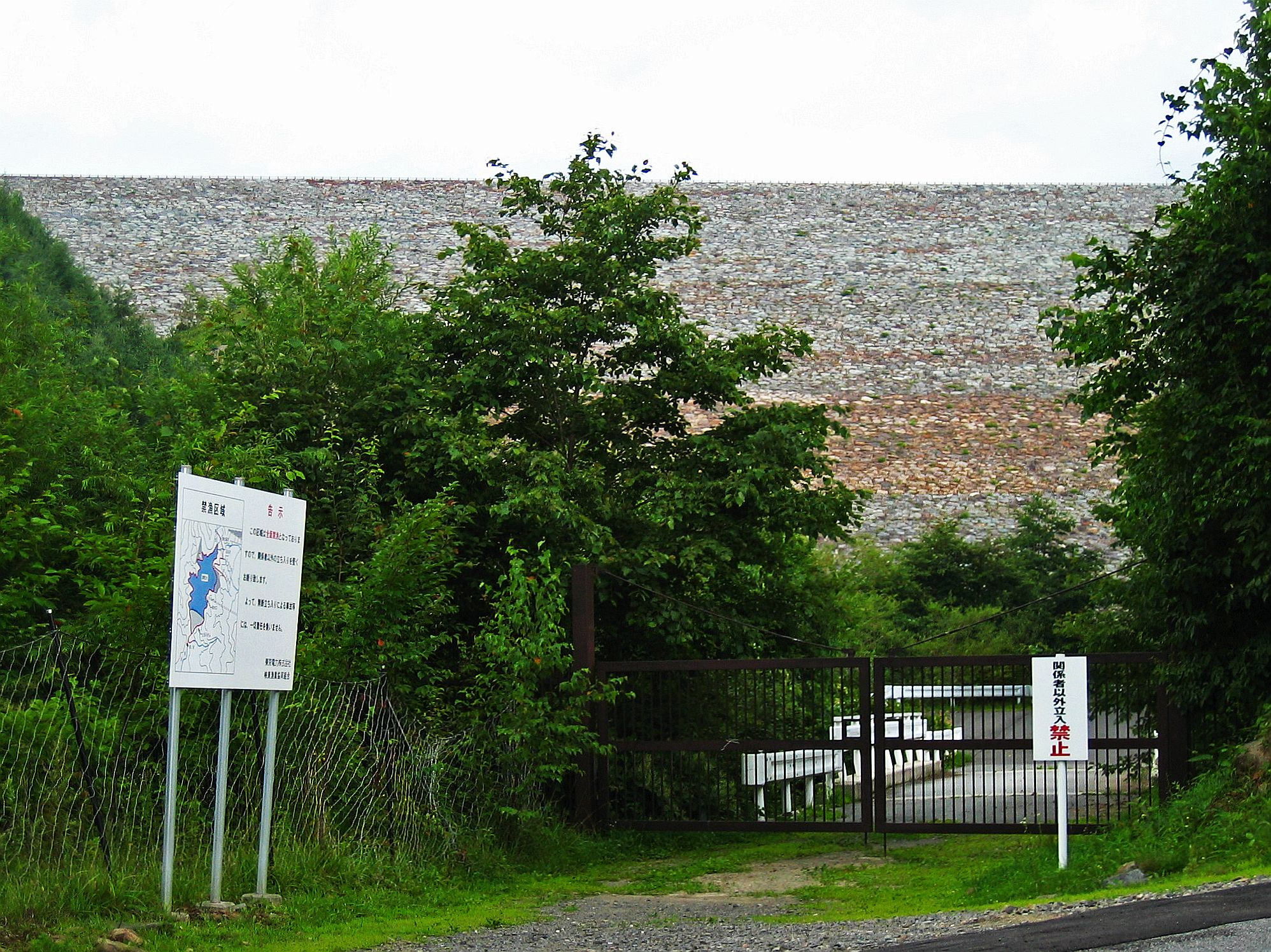
- The upper Kamihikawa Dam
- Interactive map of Kazunogawa Pumped Storage Power Station
- Country: Japan
- Location: Kōshū
- Coordinates: 35°43′07″N 138°55′47″E
- Status: Operational
- Construction began: 1991
- Opening date: Unit 1: 1999; Unit 2: 2000; Unit 3: 2024; Unit 4: 2014
- Construction cost: US$2.2 billion
- Owner: TEPCO

Upper reservoir
- Creates: Kamihikawa Reservoir
- Total capacity: 11,470,000 m^{3} (9,300 acre⋅ft)

Lower reservoir
- Creates: Kazunogawa Reservoir
- Total capacity: 11,500,000 m^{3} (9,300 acre⋅ft)

Power Station
- Hydraulic head: 779 m (2,556 ft) (max)
- Pump-generators: 3 x 400 MW (540,000 hp) reversible Francis-type
- Installed capacity: 1200 MW; Planned: 1600 MW

The Kazunogawa Pumped Storage Power Station is a pumped-storage hydroelectric power station near Kōshū in Yamanashi Prefecture, Japan. The station is designed to have an installed capacity of 1,600 megawatts (2,100,000 hp) and three of the four 400 megawatts (540,000 hp) generators are currently operational, for a total operational capacity of 1200 MW. Construction on the power station began in 1993 and the first generator was commissioned on 3 December 1999. The second was commissioned on 8 June 2000. The third one became operational on 9 June 2014, six year early due to post-power demand from the Great East Japan earthquake. The fourth and final generator is slated to be commissioned by 2024. It is owned by TEPCO and was constructed at a cost of US$2.2 billion.

== Design and operation ==
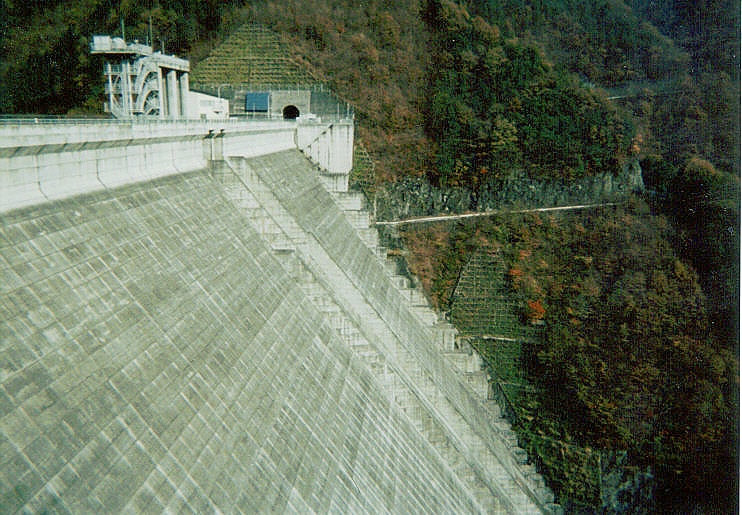
The Kazunogawa Dam which creates the lower reservoir

The upper reservoir for the power station is created by the Kamihikawa Dam at 35°42′58″N 138°49′57″E which is a 87 metres (285 ft) tall and 494-metre (1,621 ft) long rock-fill embankment type. It has a fill volume of 4,110,000 cubic metres (5,380,000 cu yd). The upper reservoir's capacity is 11,470,000 cubic metres (9,300 acre⋅ft) of which 8,300,000 cubic metres (6,700 acre⋅ft) is active (or "useful) for power generation. The lower reservoir is formed by the Kazunogawa Dam (葛野川ダム), which uses water from the Sagami River system. The Kazunogawa Dam is 105.2 metres (345 ft) tall and 263.5 metres (865 ft) long roller-compacted concrete gravity dam. It has a structural volume of 622,000 cubic metres (814,000 cu yd). The lower reservoir's capacity is 11,500,000 cubic metres (9,300 acre⋅ft) of which 8,300,000 cubic metres (6,700 acre⋅ft) is active (or "useful) for pumping into the upper reservoir.

When energy demand is high, water from the upper reservoir is released down to the underground power station via a single 3.3 kilometres (2.1 mi) long headrace tunnel which splits into two 1.8 kilometres (1.1 mi) tunnels before each separate into two 620 metres (2,030 ft) long penstocks. Each penstock feeds a single reversible 400 MW Francis turbine-generator with water before it is released into a 3.3 kilometres (2.1 mi) long tailrace tunnel which discharges into the lower reservoir. When energy demand is low and therefore inexpensive, the turbines reverse into pumps and send water from the lower reservoir back to the upper reservoir. The process is repeated when necessary to help balance electricity loads. The difference in elevation between the upper and lower reservoirs affords an effective hydraulic head of 714 metres (2,343 ft) and maximum of 779 metres (2,556 ft).

== See also ==
- Fukashiro Dam – located downstream of Kazunogawa Dam
- List of pumped-storage hydroelectric power stations
