= Underground power station =

Type of hydroelectric power station

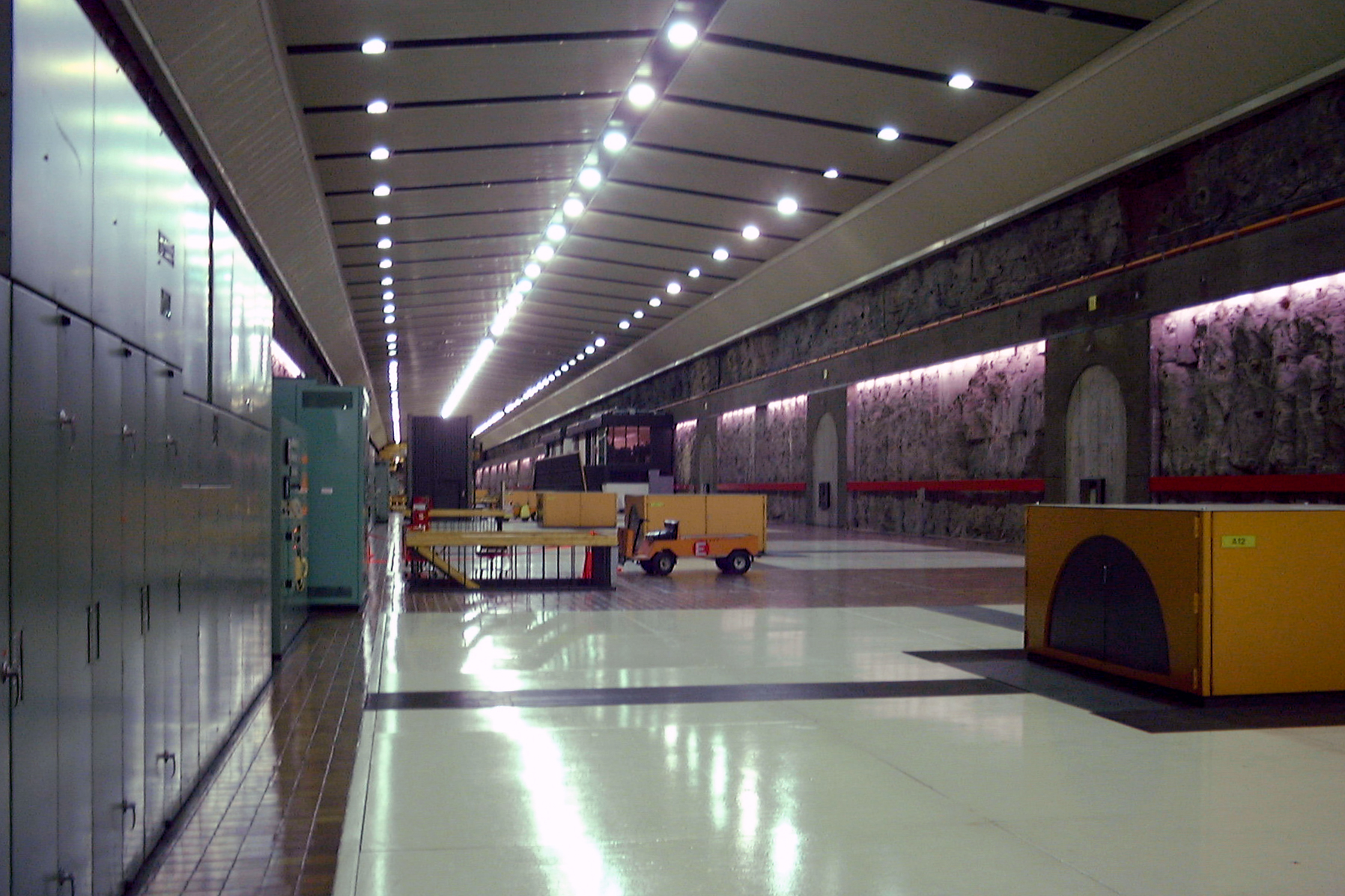
Inside the Robert-Bourassa generating station, in northern Quebec, the world's largest underground power station, with an installed capacity of 5,616 MW.

An underground power station is a type of hydroelectric power station constructed by excavating the major components (e.g. machine hall, penstocks, and tailrace) from rock, rather than the more common surface-based construction methods.

One or more conditions impact whether a power station is constructed underground. The terrain or geology around a dam is taken into consideration, as gorges or steep valleys may not accommodate a surface power station. A power station within bedrock may be less expensive to construct than a surface power station on loose soil. Avalanche-prone valleys often make a surface station unfeasible as well. After World War II, large hydroelectric power stations were placed underground more often in order to protect them from airstrikes.

Often underground power stations form part of pumped storage hydroelectricity schemes, whose basic function is to level load: they use cheap or surplus off-peak power to pump water from a lower lake to an upper lake. During peak periods (when electricity prices are often high), the power station generates power from the water held in the upper lake.

== Notable examples ==
Some notable underground power stations are:

- Kazunogawa Power Station is a 1,200 MW underground pumped storage plant in Japan. Kazunogawa consists of four 400 MW generation units. The cavern for the underground power station is 1,600 feet (500 m) below the surface. It is 690 feet (210 m) long by 177 feet (54 m) high and 112 feet (34 m) wide. The head is 2,343 feet (714 m).
- Churchill Falls Generating Station, Newfoundland and Labrador, Canada is the second largest underground power station in the world. It generates 5,428 MW from 11 turbines. The powerhouse is 761 feet (232 m) long, 148 feet (45 m) high, 62 feet (19 m) wide and located 1,080 feet (330 m) underground. The two tailrace tunnels are 1691.64 m long. The net head is 312.42 m.
- Kannagawa Hydropower Plant is a pumped-storage hydroelectric power plant near Minamiaiki in Nagano Prefecture and Ueno in Gunma Prefecture, Japan. The power house is 1,600 feet (490 m) underground and measures 708 ft (216 m) long, 108 feet (33 m) wide, and 169 feet (52 m) high. It contains 6 x 470 MW pump generators for a total capacity of 2,820 MW with an effective hydraulic head of 653 metres (2,142 ft) and maximum discharge of 510 cubic metres per second (18,000 cu ft/s). The first unit commenced operations in 2005, the second in 2012.
- Goldisthal Pumped Storage Station, in Thuringia, Germany, built in 1991-2004, generates 1,060 MW from 4 turbines. It is unique (for its scale) in Europe, in that two of the four motor generators are designed as variable speed asynchronous machines. The machine hall is 482 feet (147 m) long, 161 feet (49 m)high, 52 feet (16 m) wide, with a separate transformer cavern (390 feet (120 m) long, 49 feet (15 m)high, 52 feet (16 m) wide).
- Manapouri Power Station, Fiordland, New Zealand, built 1963-1972, generates 850 MW from 7 turbines. It is built 660 feet (200 m) underground, and has two 10 km tailrace tunnels. The net head is 560 feet (170 m). The most notable feature of this station is that the lake and power station are located on the eastern side of the Southern Alps, with the tailrace tunnels traveling under a major mountain range, discharging in Doubtful Sound on the west coast.
- Boundary Dam Powerhouse, in Pend Oreille County, Washington, United States, completed in 1967 and diverting the Pend Oreille River through six units, Boundary Powerhouse produces 1070 MW. Owned and operated by Seattle City Light.
- Chaira Hydro Power Plant, Bulgaria, is the largest underground power station in the Balkans, built from 1980 to 1998. It has an installed capacity of 864 MW from four 216 MW reversible Francis turbines with a net rated head of 2,300 feet (701 m), and maximal speed of 600 rpm.
- Cruachan Dam, United Kingdom, built in the early 1960s, a pumped storage plant generating 440 MW from 4 turbines.
- Dinorwig Power Station, Llanberis, United Kingdom, built in 1984, is a pumped-storage system, delivering 1,650 MW to Wales and the north-west of England. It stands in Europe's largest man-made cavern.
- Edward Hyatt Power Plant inside the Oroville Dam, United States, is in a cavern carved into the bedrock of the Feather River canyon. It houses 3 Generator and 3 Pump/Generator units and their respective Transformers 650 feet (200 m) below the crest of the dam.
- Kariba hydro-electric power scheme (1,200 MW) is on the Zambezi river, which forms the border between Zimbabwe and Zambia. The Kariba system comprises two underground power stations. The Kariba South station in Zimbabwe houses six 100 MW generators. The Kariba North station in Zambia houses four 150 MW generators.
- Paulo Afonso Hydroelectric Complex, Brazil; The combined 4,279.6 Paulo Afonso I, II and III were built underground. Completed in 1955, PA I was Brazil's first underground power station.
- Poatina Hydroelectric Power Station, Tasmania, Australia, built in 1966-1977 it generates 300 MW with water provided by the Great Lake, it is the largest underground power station in Australia.
- Raccoon Mountain Pumped-Storage Plant, Chattanooga, Tennessee, United States, built in 1970-1978 generates 1,530 MW. It is an early test of the pumped-storage approach.
- Robert-Bourassa generating station, Quebec, Canada, is the largest underground power station in the world. It generates 5,616 MW from 16 turbines with a net rated head of 450 feet (137.2 m).
- Snoqualmie Falls Hydroelectric Plant in King County, Washington, United States, built in two stages, Plant 1, completed in 1899 was the world's first completely underground power station and is still used to provide power to the Seattle area. The two power houses have a combined installed capacity of 53.9 MW.

== See also ==
- Underground power stations
