= Yangtze =

Longest river in Asia

Yangtze River 长江
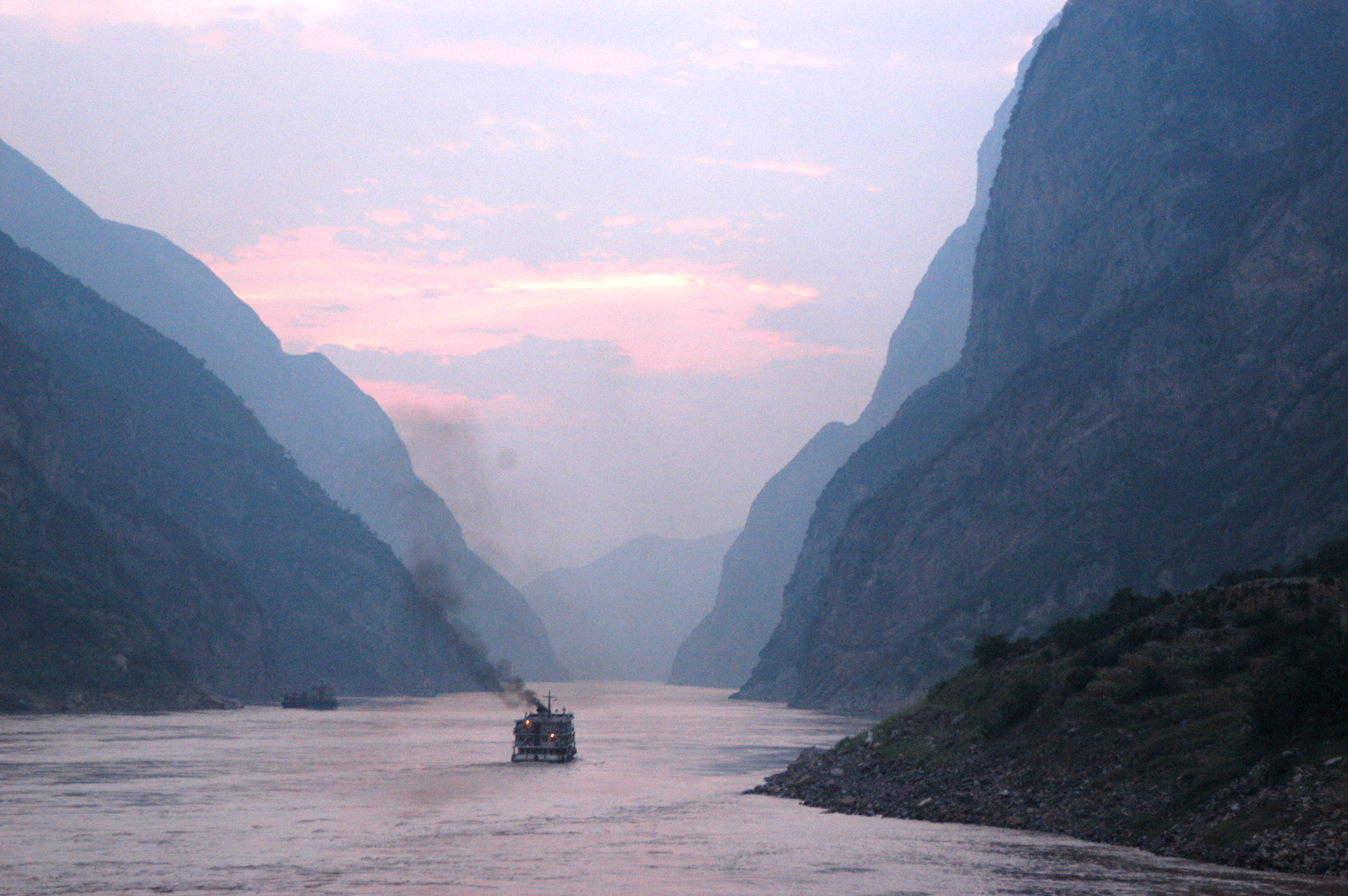
- Dusk on the middle reaches of the Yangtze River (Three Gorges) in July 2002

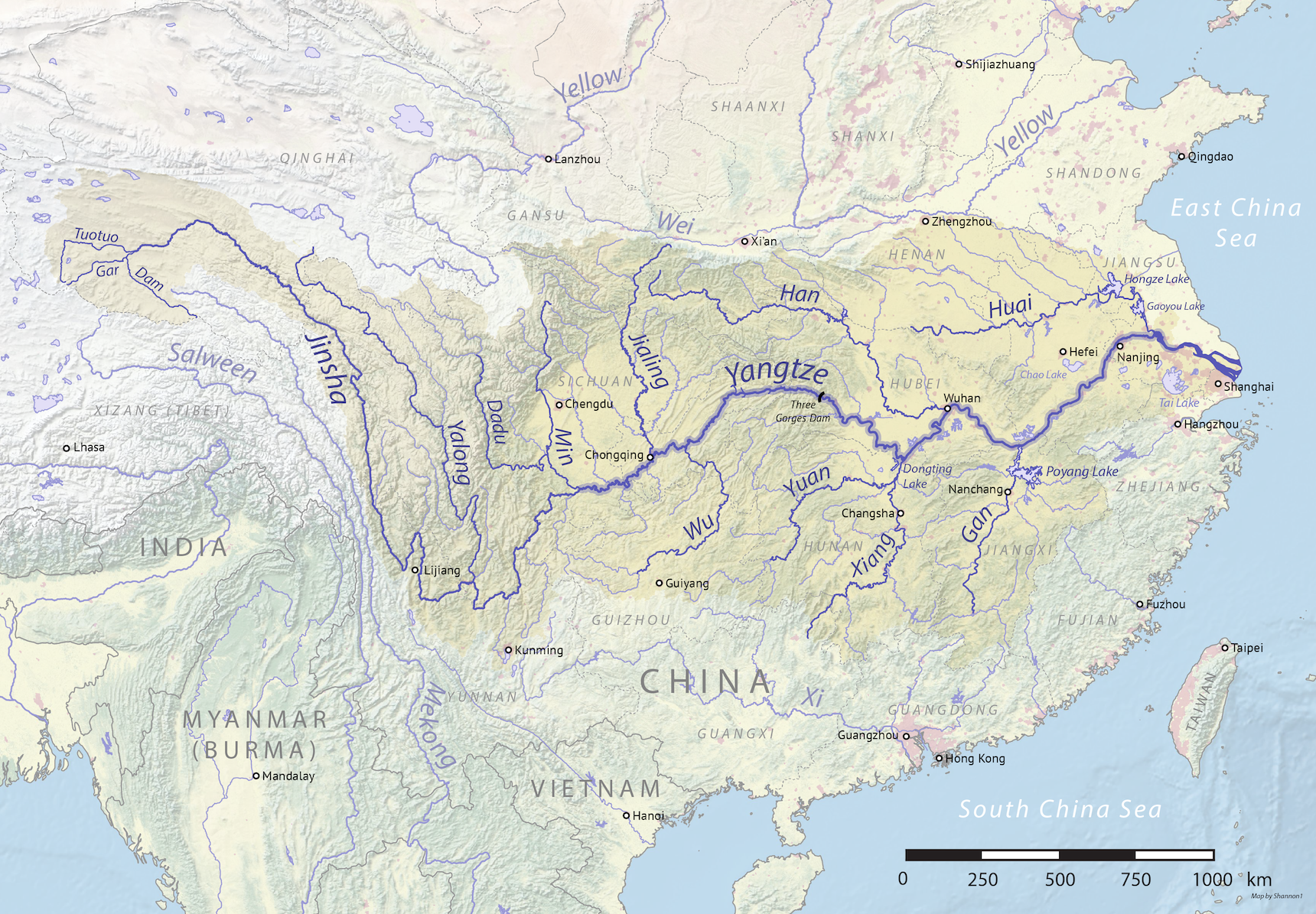
- Map of the Yangtze River drainage basin
- Native name: Cháng Jiāng (Chinese)

Location
- Country: China
- Provinces: Sichuan, Hubei, Hunan, Anhui, Jiangsu
- Municipalities: Chongqing, Shanghai
- Major cities: Luzhou, Chongqing, Yichang, Jingzhou, Yueyang, Changsha, Wuhan, Jiujiang, Anqing, Tongling, Wuhu, Nanjing, Zhenjiang, Yangzhou, Nantong, Shanghai

Physical characteristics
- Source: Dam Qu (Jari Hill)
  - location: Tanggula Mountains, Qinghai
  - coordinates: 32°36′14″N 94°30′44″E
  - elevation: 5,170 m (16,960 ft)
- 2nd source: Ulan Moron
  - coordinates: 33°23′40″N 90°53′46″E
- 3rd source: Chuma'er River
  - coordinates: 35°27′19″N 90°55′50″E
- 4th source: Muluwusu River
  - coordinates: 33°22′13″N 91°10′29″E
- 5th source: Bi Qu
  - coordinates: 33°16′58″N 91°23′29″E
- Mouth: East China Sea
  - location: Shanghai and Jiangsu
  - coordinates: 31°23′37″N 121°58′59″E
- Length: 6,300 km (3,900 mi); 6,374 km (3,961 mi) Yangtze – Jinsha – Tongtian – Dam Qu
- Basin size: 1,808,500 km^{2} (698,300 mi^{2}) (Yangtze with Huai: 1,949,514.8 km²)
- Discharge
  - location: Yangtze Estuary
  - average: (Period: 1955–2021)995.8 km^{3}/a (31,550 m^{3}/s) 30,146 m^{3}/s (1,064,600 cu ft/s)
  - maximum: 110,000 m^{3}/s (3,900,000 cu ft/s)
- Discharge
  - location: Datong hydrometric station, Anhui (Uppermost boundary of the ocean tide) (1980–2020)
  - average: 905.7 km^{3}/a (28,700 m^{3}/s) 30,708 m^{3}/s (1,084,400 cu ft/s) (2019–2020)
- Discharge
  - location: Wuhan (Hankou) (1980–2020)
  - average: 711.1 km^{3}/a (22,530 m^{3}/s)
- Discharge
  - location: Yichang (Three Gorges Dam) (1980–2020)
  - average: 428.7 km^{3}/a (13,580 m^{3}/s)

Basin features
- Progression: East China Sea
- River system: Yangtze River
- Tributaries
  - left: Yalong, Min, Tuo, Jialing, Han, Huai
  - right: Wu, Yuan, Zi, Xiang, Gan, Huangpu

Chang Jiang
- "Yangtze River (Cháng jiāng)" in Simplified (top) and Traditional (bottom) Chinese characters

Chinese name
- Simplified Chinese: 长江
- Traditional Chinese: 長江
- Literal meaning: "Long River"
Transcriptions
Standard Mandarin
- Hanyu Pinyin: Cháng Jiāng
- Bopomofo: ㄔㄤˊ ㄐㄧㄤ
- Wade–Giles: Ch'ang^{2} Chiang^{1}
- IPA: [ʈʂʰǎŋ tɕjáŋ]
Wu
- Romanization: Zan^{入} Kaon^{平}
Xiang
- IPA: dɒŋ^{13}kiɒŋ^{44}
Yue: Cantonese
- Yale Romanization: Chèuhng Gōng
- Jyutping: Coeng^{4} Gong^{1}
- IPA: [tsʰœŋ˩ kɔŋ˥]
Southern Min
- Tâi-lô: Tiông Kang
Middle Chinese
- Middle Chinese: ɖjang kæwng
Old Chinese
- Baxter–Sagart (2014): *Cə-[N]-traŋ kˤroŋ

Yangtze River
- Simplified Chinese: 扬子江
- Traditional Chinese: 揚子江
Transcriptions
Standard Mandarin
- Hanyu Pinyin: Yángzǐ Jiāng
- Bopomofo: ㄧㄤˊ ㄗˇ ㄐㄧㄤ
- Wade–Giles: Yang-tzu Chiang
- IPA: [jǎŋtsì tɕjáŋ]
Wu
- Romanization: Yang^{入} Tse^{平} Kaon^{平}
Xiang
- IPA: jɒŋ^{13}tsɯ^{31}kiɒŋ^{44}
Yue: Cantonese
- Jyutping: Joeng^{4}-zi^{2} Gong^{1}

Tibetan name
- Tibetan: འབྲི་ཆུ།
Transcriptions
- Wylie: 'Bri Chu
- THL: Dri Chu
- Tibetan Pinyin: zhiqu

The Yangtze River, Yangzi River (Note: English: /ˈjæŋtsi/ or /ˈjɑːŋtsi/) or Chang Jiang (Note: simplified Chinese: 长江; traditional Chinese: 長江; pinyin: Cháng Jiāng; Zhuyin Fuhao: ㄔㄤˊ ㄐㄧㄤ; lit. 'long river') is the longest river of China and the third-longest river in the world. It rises at Jari Hill in the Tanggula Mountains of the Tibetan Plateau and flows for 6,300 kilometers (3,900 mi), including the Dam Qu River, the longest source of the Yangtze, in a generally easterly direction to the East China Sea. It is the fifth-largest primary river by discharge volume in the world. Its drainage basin comprises one-fifth of the land area of China, and is home to nearly one-third of the country's population.

The Yangtze has played a major role in the history, culture, and economy of China. For thousands of years, the river has been used for water, irrigation, sanitation, transportation, industry, boundary-marking, and war. The Yangtze Delta generates as much as 20% of China's GDP, and the Three Gorges Dam on the Yangtze is the largest hydro-electric power station in the world. In mid-2014, the Chinese government announced it was building a multi-tier transport network, comprising railways, roads and airports to create a new economic belt alongside the river.

The Yangtze flows through a wide array of ecosystems and is a habitat for several endemic and threatened species, including the Chinese alligator and the narrow-ridged finless porpoise, and was also the home of the now extinct Yangtze river dolphin (or baiji) and Chinese paddlefish, as well as the Yangtze sturgeon, which is extinct in the wild. In recent years, the river has suffered from industrial pollution, plastic pollution, agricultural runoff, siltation, and loss of wetland and lakes, which exacerbates seasonal flooding. Some sections of the river are now protected as nature reserves. A stretch of the upstream Yangtze flowing through deep gorges in western Yunnan is part of the Three Parallel Rivers of Yunnan Protected Areas, a UNESCO World Heritage Site.

== Etymology ==
=== Chinese ===
Cháng Jiāng (长江; 長江), meaning "Long River", is the name for the river in Chinese. However, the Chinese have given different names to sections of the river (it is from an ancient name to only a part of the river that the modern English name derives – see below).

In Old Chinese, the Yangtze was simply called Jiang/Kiang 江, a character of phono-semantic compound origin, combining the water radical 氵 with the homophone 工 (now pronounced gōng, but *kˤoŋ in Old Chinese). Kong was probably a word in the Austroasiatic language of local peoples such as the Yue. Similar to *krong in Proto-Vietnamese and krung in Mon, all meaning "river", it is related to modern Vietnamese sông (river) and Khmer krung (city on riverside), whence Thai krung (กรุง capital city), not kôngkea (water) which is from the Sanskrit root gáṅgā.

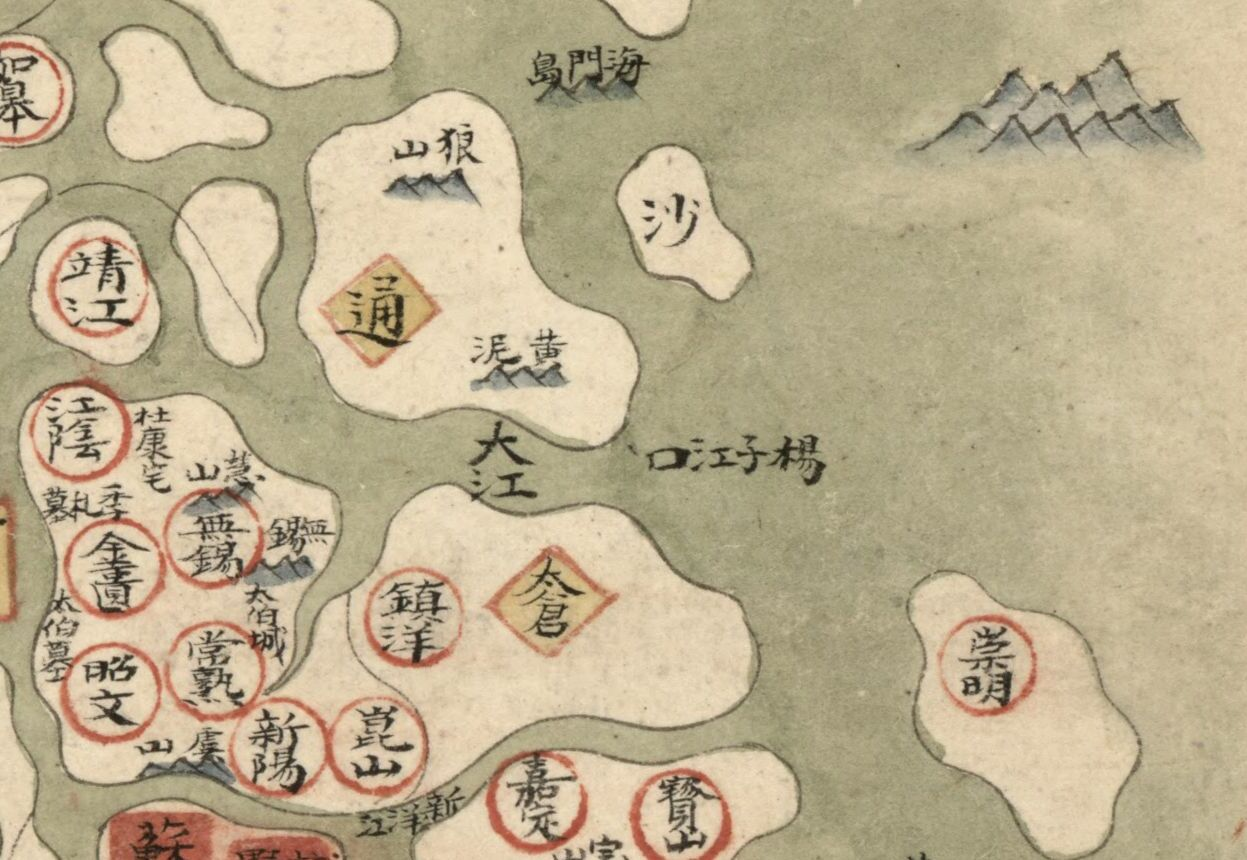
The "Great River" (大江) with its entrance to the East China Sea marked as the "Mouth of the Yangtze" (揚子江口) on the Jiangnan map in the 1754 Provincial Atlas of the Qing Empire

By the Han dynasty, Jiāng had come to mean any river in Chinese, and this river was distinguished as the "Great River" 大江 (Dàjiāng). The epithet 長 (simplified version 长), meaning "long", was first formally applied to the river during the Six Dynasties period.

Various sections of the Yangtze have local names. From Yibin to Yichang, the river through Sichuan and Chongqing Municipality is also known as the Chuān Jiāng (川江) or "Sichuan River". In Hubei, the river is also called the Jīng Jiāng (荆江; 荊江) or the "Jing River" after Jingzhou, one of the Nine Provinces of ancient China. In Anhui, the river takes on the local name Wǎn Jiāng after the shorthand name for Anhui, wǎn (皖). Jinsha ("Gold Sands") River refers to the 2,308 km (1,434 mi) of the Yangtze from Yibin upstream to the confluence with the Batang River near Yushu in Qinghai, while the Tongtian ("Leading to Heaven") River describes the 813 km (505 mi) section from Yushu up to the confluence of the Tuotuo River and the Dangqu River.

Yángzǐ Jiāng (揚子江; 扬子江) or the "Yangzi River", from which the English name Yangtze is derived, is the local name for the Lower Yangtze in the region of Yangzhou. The name likely comes from an ancient ferry crossing called Yángzǐ or Yángzǐjīn (揚子 / 揚子津). Europeans who arrived in the Yangtze River Delta region applied this local name to the whole river.

=== English and other European ===
In the West, the river was called Quian (江) and Quianshui (江水) by Marco Polo, and appeared on the earliest English maps as Kian or Kiam. By the mid-19th century, these romanizations had standardized as Kiang.

A related form also popularized in English was "Kian-ku," also spelled "Keeang-Koo" and "Kyang Kew", derived from mistaking the Chinese term for the mouth of the Yangtze (江口, Jiāngkǒu) as the name of the river itself.

The name Blue River began to be applied in the 18th century, apparently owing to a former name of the Dam Chu (Note: Mongolian: Xөх Мөрөн, Höh or Kök Mörön.) or Min (Note: Recorded as bearing the local Chinese name of 清水 (Qīngshuǐ), literally meaning "Clear Water[way].") and to analogy with the Yellow River, but it was frequently explained in early English references as a 'translation' of Jiang, Jiangkou, or Yangzijiang. Very common in 18th- and 19th-century sources, the name fell out of favor due to growing awareness of its lack of any connection to the river's Chinese names and to the irony of its application to such a muddy waterway.

Matteo Ricci's 1615 Latin account De Christiana expeditione apud Sinas included descriptions of the "Iansu" and "Iansuchian." The posthumous account's translation of the name as Fils de la Mer ("Son of the Ocean") shows that Ricci, who by the end of his life was fluent in literary Chinese, was introduced to it as the homophonic 洋子江 rather than the usual 揚子江. Further, although railroads and the Shanghai concessions subsequently turned it into a backwater, Yangzhou was the lower river's principal port for much of the Qing dynasty, directing Liangjiang's important salt monopoly and connecting the Yangtze with the Grand Canal to Beijing. (That connection also made it one of the Yellow River's principal ports between the floods of 1344 and the 1850s, during which time the Yellow River ran well south of Shandong and discharged into the ocean a mere few hundred kilometers from the mouth of the Yangtze.)

Yángzǐ Jiāng (揚子江; 扬子江), or the "Yangzi River", from which the English name Yangtze is derived, is the local name for the Lower Yangtze in the region of Yangzhou (see above). Europeans who arrived in the Yangtze River Delta region applied this local name to the whole river.

By 1800, English cartographers such as Aaron Arrowsmith had adopted the French style of the name as Yang-tse or Yang-tse Kiang. The British diplomat Thomas Wade emended this to Yang-tzu Chiang as part of his formerly popular romanization of Chinese, based on the Beijing dialect instead of Nanjing's and first published in 1867. The spellings Yangtze and Yangtze Kiang was a compromise between the two methods adopted at the 1906 Imperial Postal Conference in Shanghai, which established postal romanization. Hanyu Pinyin was adopted by the PRC's First Congress in 1958, but it was not widely employed in English outside mainland China prior to the normalization of diplomatic relations between the United States and the PRC in 1979; since that time, the spelling Yangzi has also been used.

=== Tibetan ===
The source and upper reaches of the Yangtze are located in ethnic Tibetan areas of Qinghai. In Tibetan, the Tuotuo headwaters are the Machu (Tibetan: རྨ་ཆུ་, Wylie: rma-chu, lit. "Red Water"). The Tongtian is the Drichu (འབྲི་ཆུ་ , 'Bri Chu'), literally "Water of the Female Yak"; transliterated into Chinese: 直曲; pinyin: Zhíqū).

== Geography ==
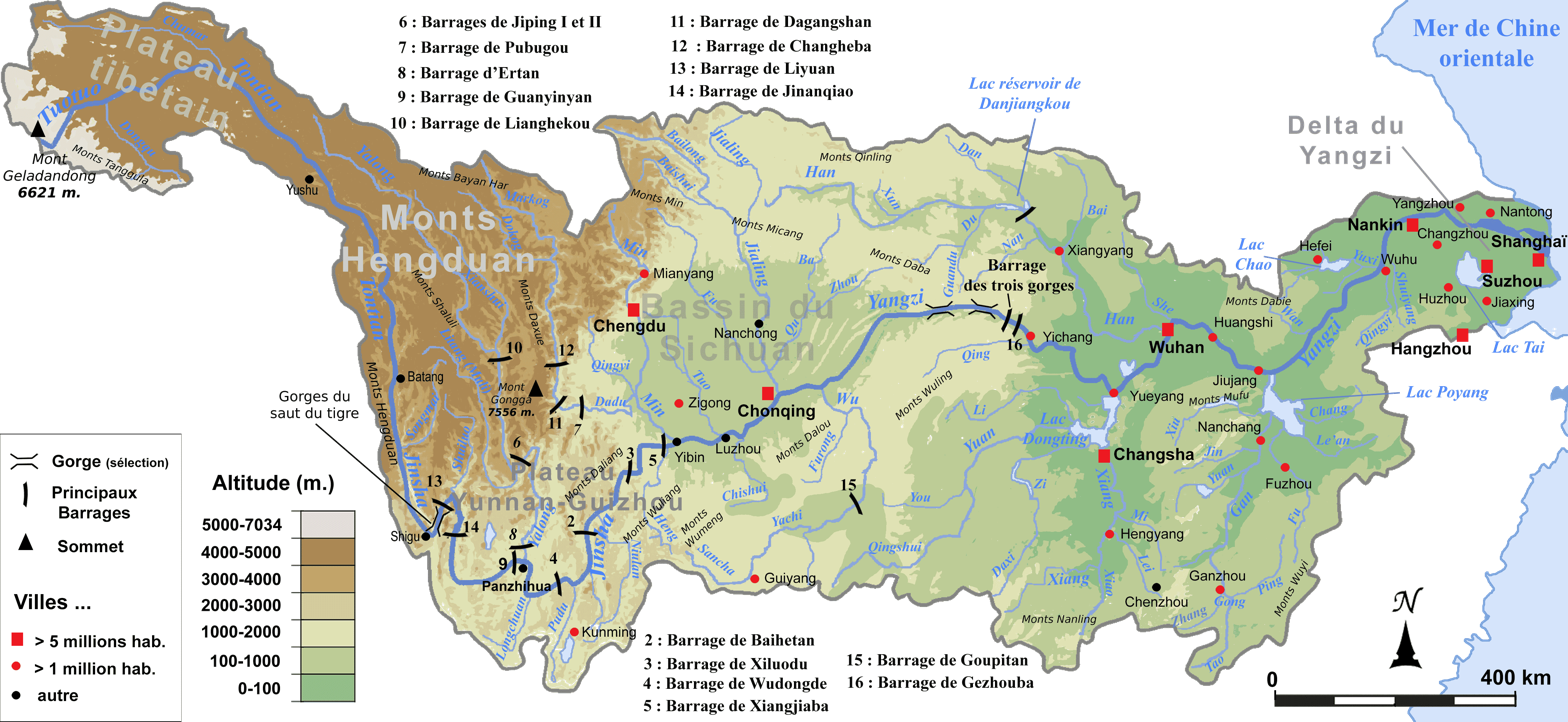
Topological map of Yangzi Basin

The river originates from several tributaries in the eastern part of the Tibetan Plateau, two of which are commonly referred to as the "source." Traditionally, the Chinese government has recognized the source as the Tuotuo tributary at the base of a glacier lying on the west of Geladandong Mountain in the Tanggula Mountains. This source is found at 33°25′44″N 91°10′57″E and while not the furthest source of the Yangtze, it is the highest source at 5,342 meters (17,526 ft) above sea level. The true source of the Yangtze, hydrologically the longest river distance from the sea, is at Jari Hill at the head of the Dam Qu tributary, approximately 365 kilometers (227 mi) southeast of Geladandong. This source was only discovered in the late 20th century and lies in wetlands at 32°36′14″N 94°30′44″E and 5,170 meters (16,960 ft) above sea level just southeast of Chadan Township in Zadoi County, Yushu Prefecture, Qinghai. As the historical spiritual source of the Yangtze, the Geladandong source is still commonly referred to as the source of the Yangtze since the discovery of the Jari Hill source.

These tributaries join and the river then runs eastward through Qinghai (Tsinghai), turning southward down a deep valley at the border of Sichuan (Szechwan) and Tibet to reach Yunnan. In the course of this valley, the river's elevation drops from above 5,000 meters (16,000 ft) to less than 1,000 meters (3,300 ft). Thus, over the first 2,600 kilometers (1,600 mi) of its length, the river has fallen more than 5,200 meters (17,100 ft).

It enters the basin of Sichuan at Yibin. While in the Sichuan basin, it receives several large tributaries, increasing its water volume significantly. It then cuts through Mount Wushan bordering Chongqing and Hubei to create the famous Three Gorges. Eastward of the Three Gorges, Yichang is the first city on the Yangtze Plain.

After entering Hubei province, the Yangtze receives water from a number of lakes. The largest of these lakes is Dongting Lake, which is located on the border of Hunan and Hubei provinces, and is the outlet for most of the rivers in Hunan. At Wuhan, it receives its biggest tributary, the Han River, bringing water from its northern basin as far as Shaanxi.

At the northern tip of Jiangxi province, Lake Poyang, the biggest freshwater lake in China, merges into the river. The river then runs through Anhui and Jiangsu, receiving more water from innumerable smaller lakes and rivers, and finally reaches the East China Sea at Shanghai.

Four of China's five main freshwater lakes contribute their waters to the Yangtze River. Traditionally, the upstream part of the Yangtze River refers to the section from Yibin to Yichang; the middle part refers to the section from Yichang to Hukou County, where Lake Poyang meets the river; the downstream part is from Hukou to Shanghai.

The origin of the Yangtze River has been dated by some geologists to about 45 million years ago in the Eocene, but this dating has been disputed.

== History ==
=== Geologic history ===
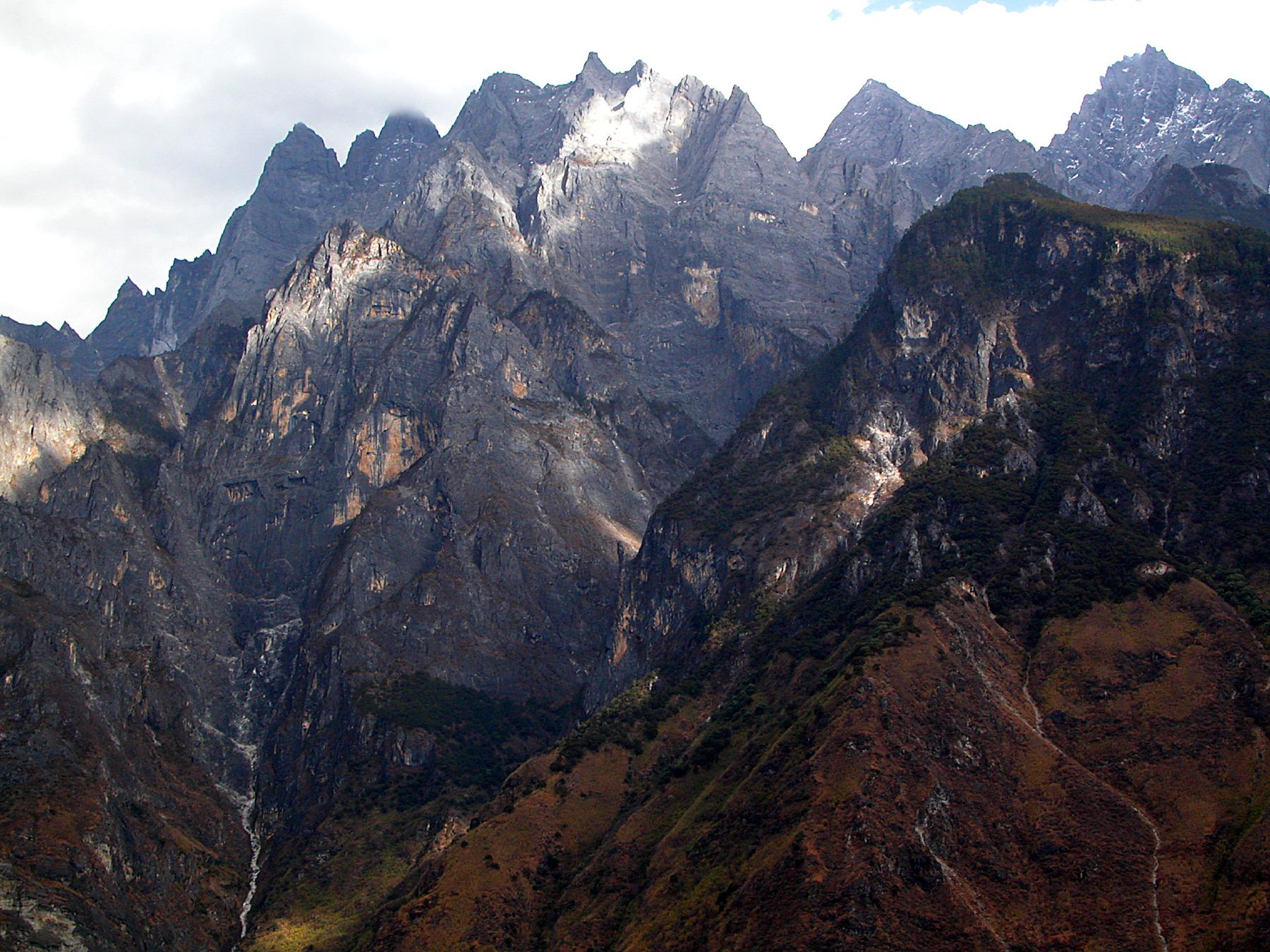
Afternoon in the jagged mountains rising from the Yangtze River gorge

Although the mouth of the Yellow River has fluctuated widely north and south of the Shandong peninsula within the historical record, the Yangtze has remained largely static. Based on studies of sedimentation rates, however, it is unlikely that the present discharge site predates the late Miocene (c. 11 Ma). Prior to this, its headwaters drained south into the Gulf of Tonkin along or near the course of the present Red River.

=== Early history ===
The Yangtze River is important to the cultural origins of southern China and Japan. Human activity has been verified in the Three Gorges area as far back as 27,000 years ago, and by the 5th millennium BC, the lower Yangtze was a major population center occupied by the Hemudu and Majiabang cultures, both among the earliest cultivators of rice. By the 3rd millennium BC, the successor Liangzhu culture showed evidence of influence from the Longshan peoples of the North China Plain. What is now thought of as Chinese culture developed along the more fertile Yellow River basin; the "Yue" people of the lower Yangtze possessed very different traditions – blackening their teeth, cutting their hair short, tattooing their bodies, and living in small settlements among bamboo groves – and were considered barbarous by the northerners.

The Central Yangtze valley was home to sophisticated Neolithic cultures. Later it became the earliest part of the Yangtze valley to be integrated into the North Chinese cultural sphere. (Northern Chinese were active there since the Bronze Age).

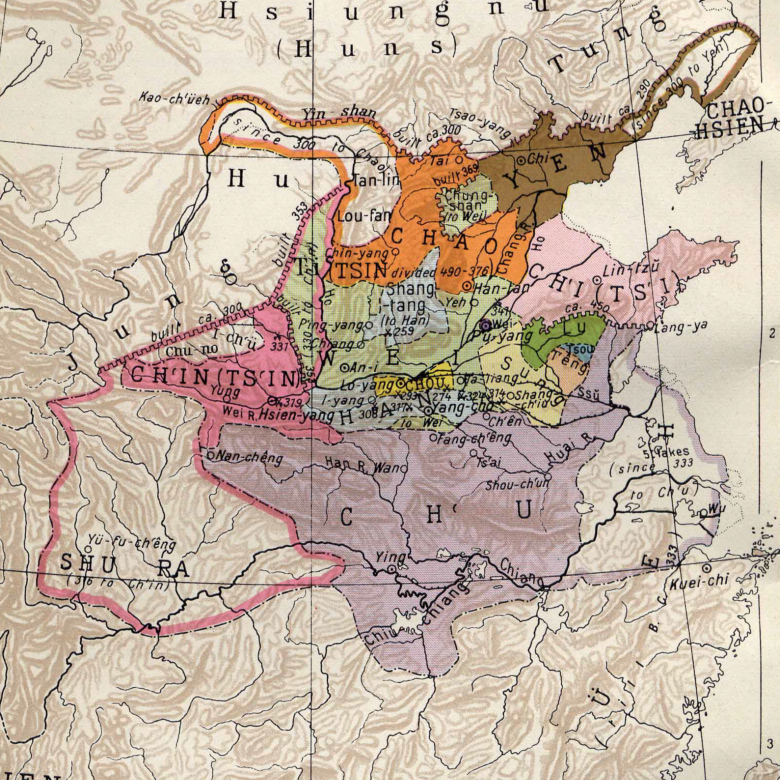
A map of the Warring States around 350 BC, showing the former coastline of the Yangtze delta

In the lower Yangtze, two Yue tribes, the Gouwu in southern Jiangsu and the Yuyue in northern Zhejiang, display increasing Zhou (i.e., North Chinese) influence starting in the 9th century BC. Traditional accounts credit these changes to northern refugees (Taibo and Zhongyong in Wu and Wuyi in Yue) who assumed power over the local tribes, though these are generally assumed to be myths invented to legitimate them to other Zhou rulers. As the kingdoms of Wu and Yue, they were famed as fishers, shipwrights, and sword-smiths. Adopting Chinese characters, political institutions, and military technology, they were among the most powerful states during the later Zhou. In the middle Yangtze, the state of Jing seems to have begun in the upper Han River valley a minor Zhou polity, but it adapted to native culture as it expanded south and east into the Yangtze valley. In the process, it changed its name to Chu.

Whether native or nativizing, the Yangtze states held their own against the northern Chinese homeland: some lists credit them with three of the Spring and Autumn period's Five Hegemons and one of the Warring States' Four Lords. They fell in against themselves, however. Chu's growing power led its rival Jin to support Wu as a counter. Wu successfully sacked Chu's capital Ying in 506 BC, but Chu subsequently supported Yue in its attacks against Wu's southern flank. In 473 BC, King Goujian of Yue fully annexed Wu and moved his court to its eponymous capital at modern Suzhou. In 333 BC, Chu finally united the lower Yangtze by annexing Yue, whose royal family was said to have fled south and established the Minyue kingdom in Fujian. Qin was able to unite China by first subduing Ba and Shu on the upper Yangtze in modern Sichuan, giving them a strong base to attack Chu's settlements along the river.

The state of Qin conquered the central Yangtze region, the previous heartland of Chu, in 278 BC, and incorporated the region into its expanding empire. Qin then used its connections along the Xiang River to expand into Hunan, Jiangxi and Guangdong, setting up military commanderies along the main lines of communication. At the collapse of the Qin Dynasty, these southern commanderies became the independent Nanyue Empire under Zhao Tuo while Chu and Han vied with each other for control of the north.

Since the Han dynasty, the region of the Yangtze River grew ever more important to China's economy. The establishment of irrigation systems (the most famous one is Dujiangyan, northwest of Chengdu, built during the Warring States period) made agriculture very stable and productive, eventually exceeding even the Yellow River region. The Qin and Han empires were actively engaged in the agricultural colonization of the Yangtze lowlands, maintaining a system of dikes to protect farmland from seasonal floods. By the Song dynasty, the area along the Yangtze had become among the wealthiest and most developed parts of the country, especially in the lower reaches of the river. Early in the Qing dynasty, the region called Jiangnan (that includes the southern part of Jiangsu, the northern part of Zhejiang and Jiangxi, and the southeastern part of Anhui) provided 1/3–1/2 of the nation's revenues.

The Yangtze has long been the backbone of China's inland water transportation system, which remained particularly important for almost two thousand years, until the construction of the national railway network during the 20th century. The Grand Canal connects the lower Yangtze with the major cities of the Jiangnan region south of the river (Wuxi, Suzhou, Hangzhou) and with northern China (all the way from Yangzhou to Beijing). The less well known ancient Lingqu Canal, connecting the upper Xiang River with the headwaters of the Guijiang, allowed a direct water connection from the Yangtze Basin to the Pearl River Delta.

Historically, the Yangtze was the political boundary between north China and south China several times (see History of China) because crossing the river was difficult. This occurred notably during the Southern and Northern Dynasties, and the Southern Song. Many battles took place along the river, the most famous being the Battle of Red Cliffs in 208 AD during the Three Kingdoms period.

The Yangtze was the site of naval battles between the Song dynasty and Jurchen Jin during the Jin–Song wars. In the Battle of Caishi of 1161, the ships of the Jin emperor Wanyan Liang clashed with the Song fleet on the Yangtze. Song soldiers fired bombs of lime and sulfur using trebuchets at the Jurchen warships. The battle was a Song victory that halted the invasion by the Jin. The Battle of Tangdao was another Yangtze naval battle in the same year.

Politically, Nanjing was the capital of China several times, although most of the time its territory only covered the southeastern part of China, such as the Wu kingdom in the Three Kingdoms period, the Eastern Jin Dynasty, and during the Southern and Northern Dynasties and Five Dynasties and Ten Kingdoms periods. Only the Ming occupied most parts of China from their capital at Nanjing, though it later moved the capital to Beijing. The capital of the Nationalist government was located in Nanjing in the periods 1927–1937 and 1945–1949.

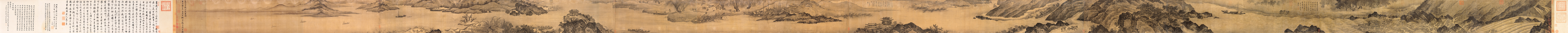
Ten Thousand Miles of the Yangtze River, a Ming dynasty landscape painting

=== Age of steam ===
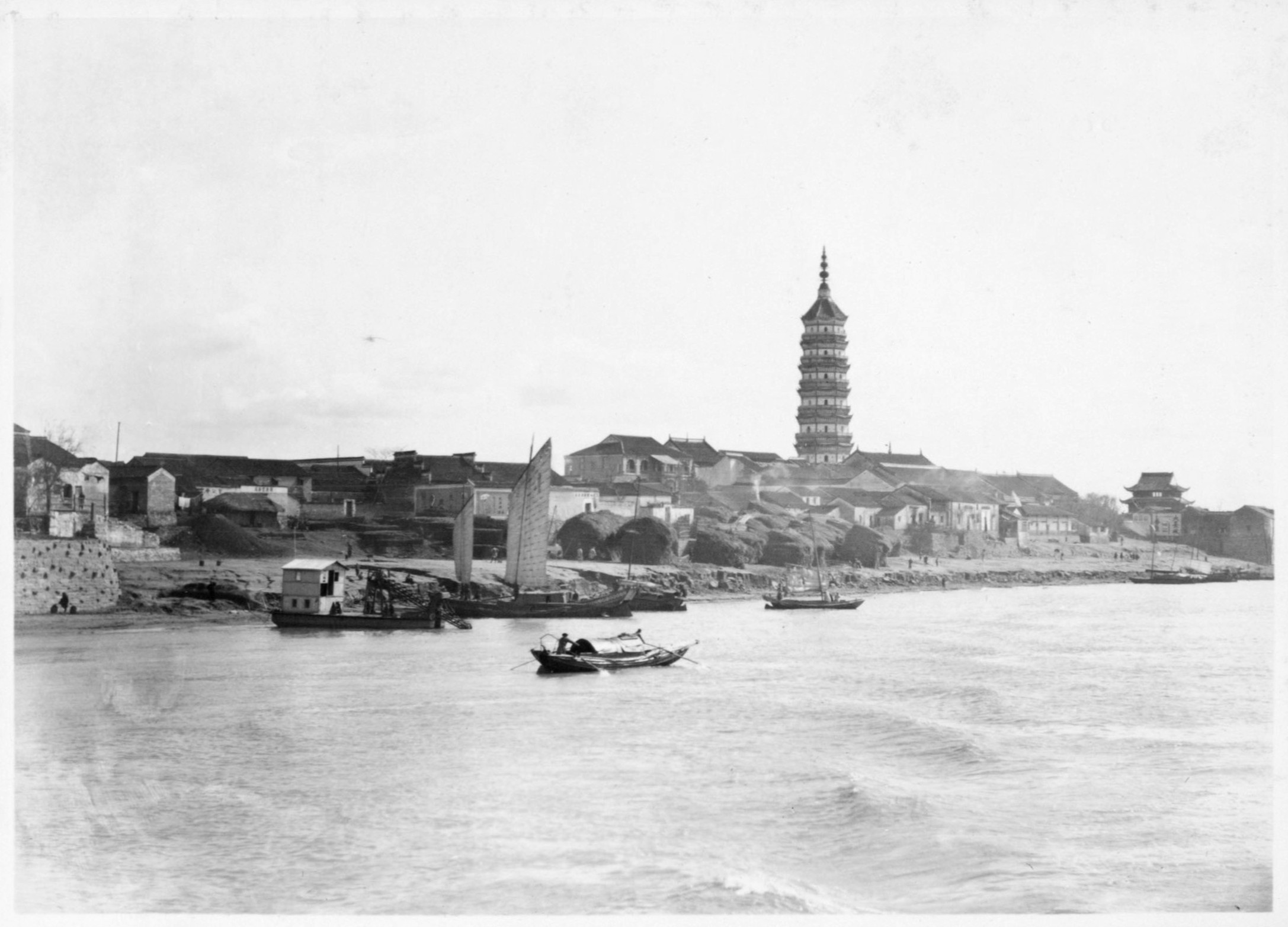
Bank of Yangtze near Anqing, then the capital of Anhui province, 1926

Yangtze River steam boats filmed in 1937

The Jardine, the first steamship to sail the river, was built for the British firm Jardine, Matheson & Co. in 1835. This small vessel was to carry passengers and mail between Lintin Island, Macao, and Huangpu. However, the Chinese, draconian in their application of the rules relating to foreign vessels, were unhappy about a "fire-ship" steaming up the Canton River. The acting Viceroy of Liangguang issued an edict warning that she would be fired on if she attempted the trip. On the Jardine's first trial run from Lintin Island the forts on both sides of the Bogue opened fire and she was forced to turn back. The Chinese authorities issued a further warning insisting that the ship leave Chinese waters. The Jardine in any case needed repairs and was sent to Singapore.

Subsequently, Lord Palmerston, the Foreign Secretary decided mainly on the "suggestions" of William Jardine to declare war on China. In mid-1840, a large fleet of warships appeared on the China coast, and with the first cannonball fired at a British ship, the Royal Saxon, the British started the first of the Opium Wars. Royal Navy warships destroyed numerous shore batteries and Chinese warships, laying waste to several coastal forts along the way. Eventually, they pushed their way up north close enough to threaten the Imperial Palace in Beijing itself.

The China Navigation Company was an early shipping company founded in 1876 in London, initially to trade up the Yangtze River from their Shanghai base with passengers and cargo. Chinese coastal trade started shortly after, and in 1883 a regular service to Australia was initiated.

=== Navigation on the upper river ===
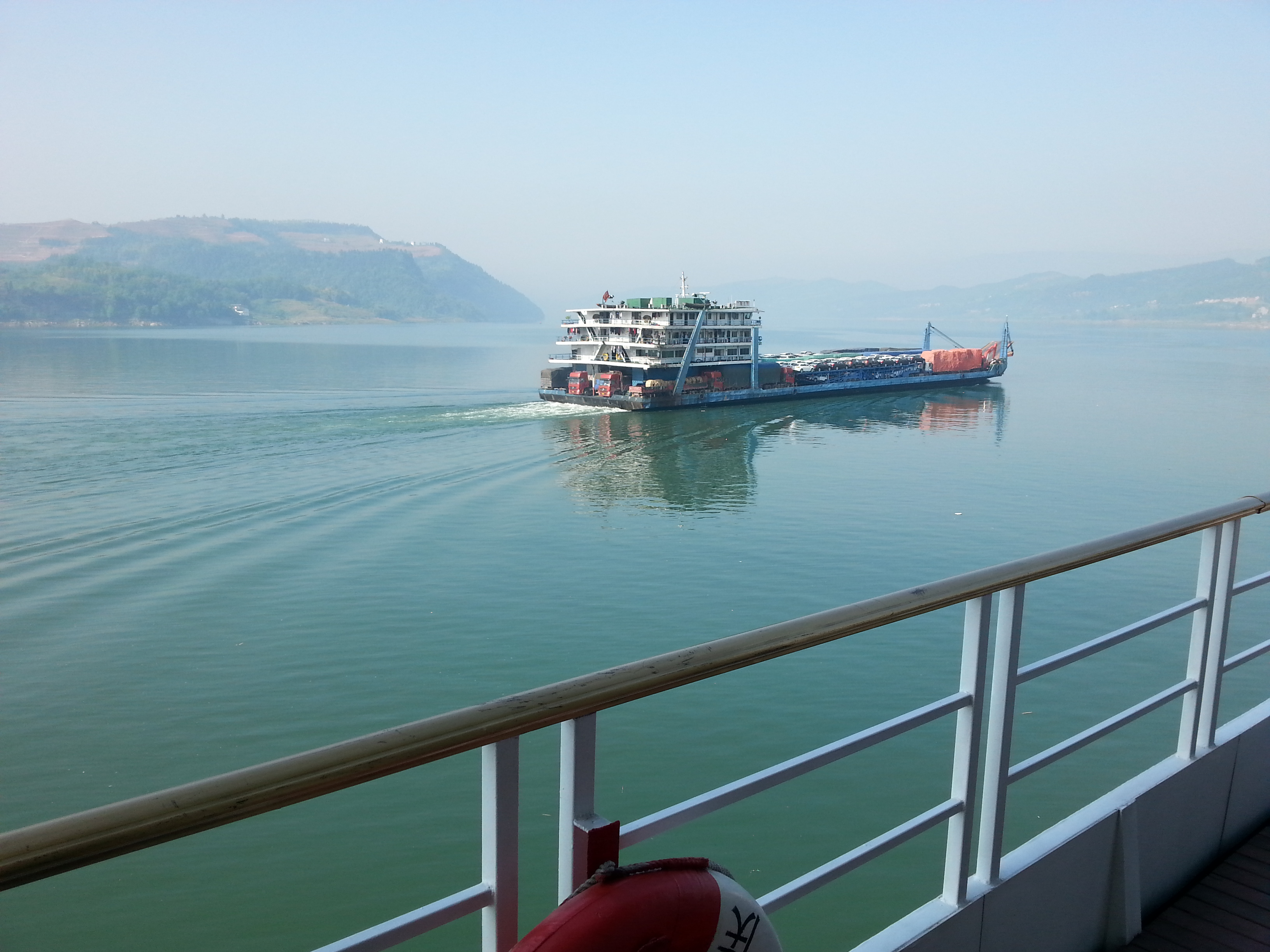
A vehicle carrier on Yangtze

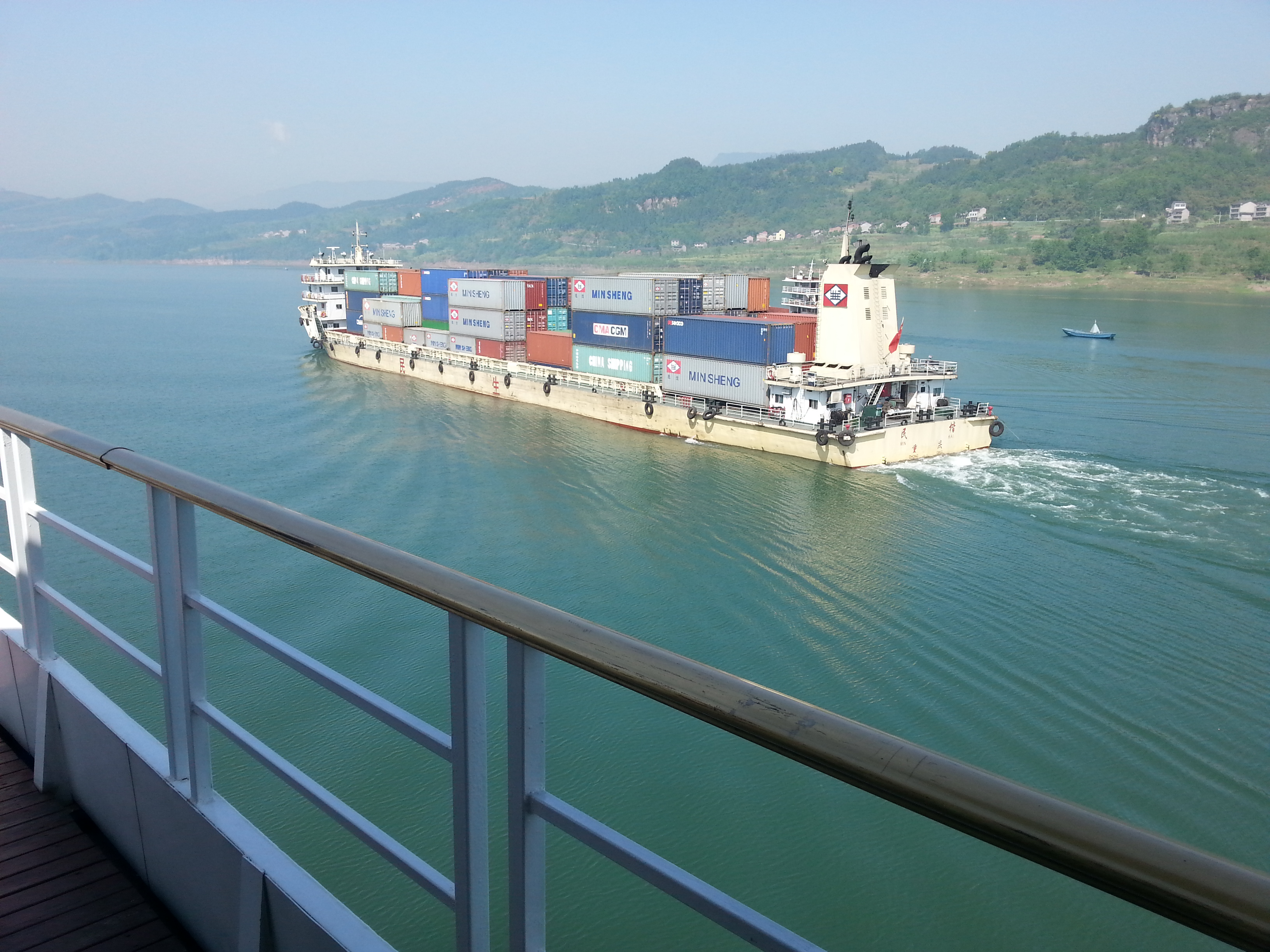
A container carrier on Yangtze

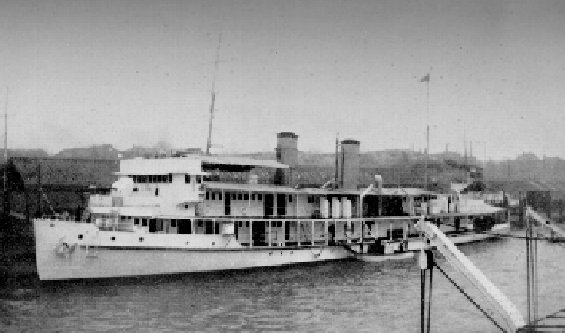
USS Luzon (PG-47) served in the Yangtze Patrol and captured by Japanese during World War II

Steamers came late to the upper river, the section stretching from Yichang to Chongqing. Freshets from Himalayan snowmelt created treacherous seasonal currents. But summer was better navigationally and the Three Gorges, described as a "150-mile passage which is like the narrow throat of an hourglass", posed hazardous threats of crosscurrents, whirlpools and eddies, creating significant challenges to steamship efforts. Furthermore, Chongqing is 700–800 ft (210–240 m) above sea level, requiring powerful engines to make the upriver climb. Junk travel accomplished the upriver feat by employing 70–80 trackers, men hitched to hawsers who physically pulled ships upriver through some of the riskiest and deadliest sections of the three gorges.

Archibald John Little took an interest in Upper Yangtze navigation when in 1876, the Chefoo Convention opened Chongqing to consular residence but stipulated that foreign trade might only commence once steamships had succeeded in ascending the river to that point. Little formed the Upper Yangtze Steam Navigation Co., Ltd. and built Kuling but his attempts to take the vessel further upriver than Yichang were thwarted by the Chinese authorities who were concerned about the potential loss of transit duties, competition to their native junk trade and physical damage to their craft caused by steamship wakes. Kuling was sold to China Merchants Steam Navigation Company for lower river service. In 1890, the Chinese government agreed to open Chongqing to foreign trade as long as it was restricted to native craft.

In 1895, the Treaty of Shimonoseki provided a provision which opened Chongqing fully to foreign trade. Little took up residence in Chongqing and built Leechuan, to tackle the gorges in 1898. In March Leechuan completed the upriver journey to Chongqing but not without the assistance of trackers. Leechuan was not designed for cargo or passengers and if Little wanted to take his vision one step further, he required an expert pilot.

In 1898, Little persuaded Captain Samuel Cornell Plant to come out to China to lend his expertise. Captain Plant had just completed navigation of Persia's Upper Karun River and took up Little's offer to assess the Upper Yangtze on Leechuan at the end of 1898. With Plant's design input, Little had SS Pioneer built with Plant in command. In June 1900, Plant was the first to successfully pilot a merchant steamer on the Upper Yangtze from Yichang to Chongqing. Pioneer was sold to Royal Navy after its first run due to threat from the Boxer Rebellion and renamed HMS Kinsha. Germany's steamship effort that same year on SS Suixing ended in catastrophe. On Suixing's maiden voyage, the vessel hit a rock and sunk, killing its captain and ending realistic hopes of regular commercial steam service on the Upper Yangtze.

In 1908, local Sichuan merchants and their government partnered with Captain Plant to form Sichuan Steam Navigation Company becoming the first successful service between Yichang and Chongqing. Captain Plant designed and commanded its two ships, SS Shutung and SS Shuhun. Other Chinese vessels came onto the run and by 1915, foreign ships expressed their interest too. Plant was appointed by Chinese Maritime Customs Service as First Senior River Inspector in 1915. In this role, Plant installed navigational marks and established signaling systems.

He also wrote Handbook for the Guidance of Shipmasters on the Ichang-Chungking Section of the Yangtze River, a detailed and illustrated account of the Upper Yangtze's currents, rocks, and other hazards with navigational instruction. Plant trained hundreds of Chinese and foreign pilots and issued licenses and worked with the Chinese government to make the river safer in 1917 by removing some of the most difficult obstacles and threats with explosives. In August 1917, British Asiatic Petroleum became the first foreign merchant steamship on the Upper Yangtze. Commercial firms, Robert Dollar Company, Jardine Matheson, Butterfield and Swire and Standard Oil added their own steamers on the river between 1917 and 1919. Between 1918 and 1919, Sichuan warlord violence and escalating civil war put Sichuan Steam Navigational Company out of business. Shutung was commandeered by warlords and Shuhun was brought down river to Shanghai for safekeeping.

In 1921, when Captain Plant died at sea while returning home to England, a Plant Memorial Fund was established to perpetuate Plant's name and contributions to Upper Yangtze navigation. The largest shipping companies in service, Butterfield & Swire, Jardine Matheson, Standard Oil, Mackenzie & Co., Asiatic Petroleum, Robert Dollar, China Merchants S.N. Co. and British-American Tobacco Co., contributed alongside international friends and Chinese pilots. In 1924, a 50-foot granite pyramidal obelisk was erected in Xintan, on the site of Captain Plant's home, in a Chinese community of pilots and junk owners. One face of the monument is inscribed in Chinese and another in English. Though recently relocated to higher ground ahead of the Three Gorges Dam, the monument still stands overlooking the Upper Yangtze River near Yichang, a rare collective tribute to a westerner in China.

Standard Oil ran the tankers Mei Ping, Mei An and Mei Hsia, which were collectively destroyed on December 12, 1937, when Japanese warplanes bombed and sank the USS Panay (PR-5). One of the Standard Oil captains who survived this attack had served on the Upper River for 14 years.

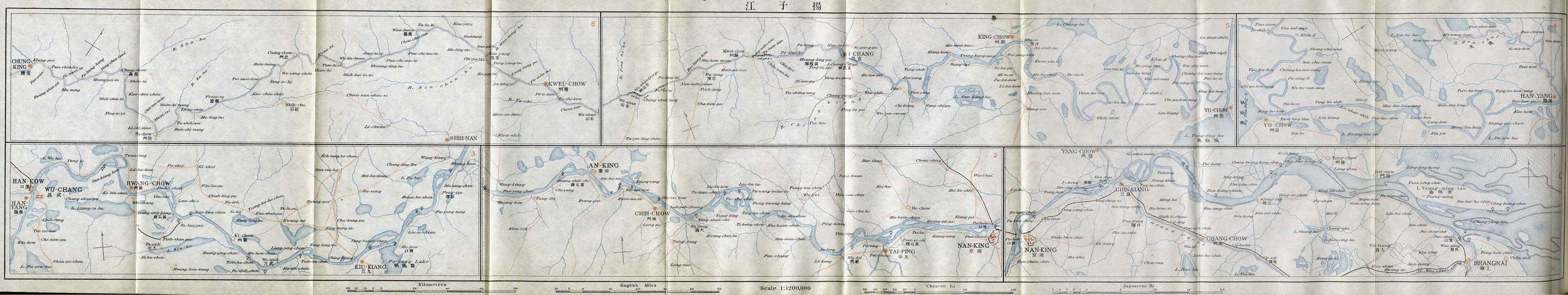
Navigation map of Yangtze in 1915

=== Navy ships ===
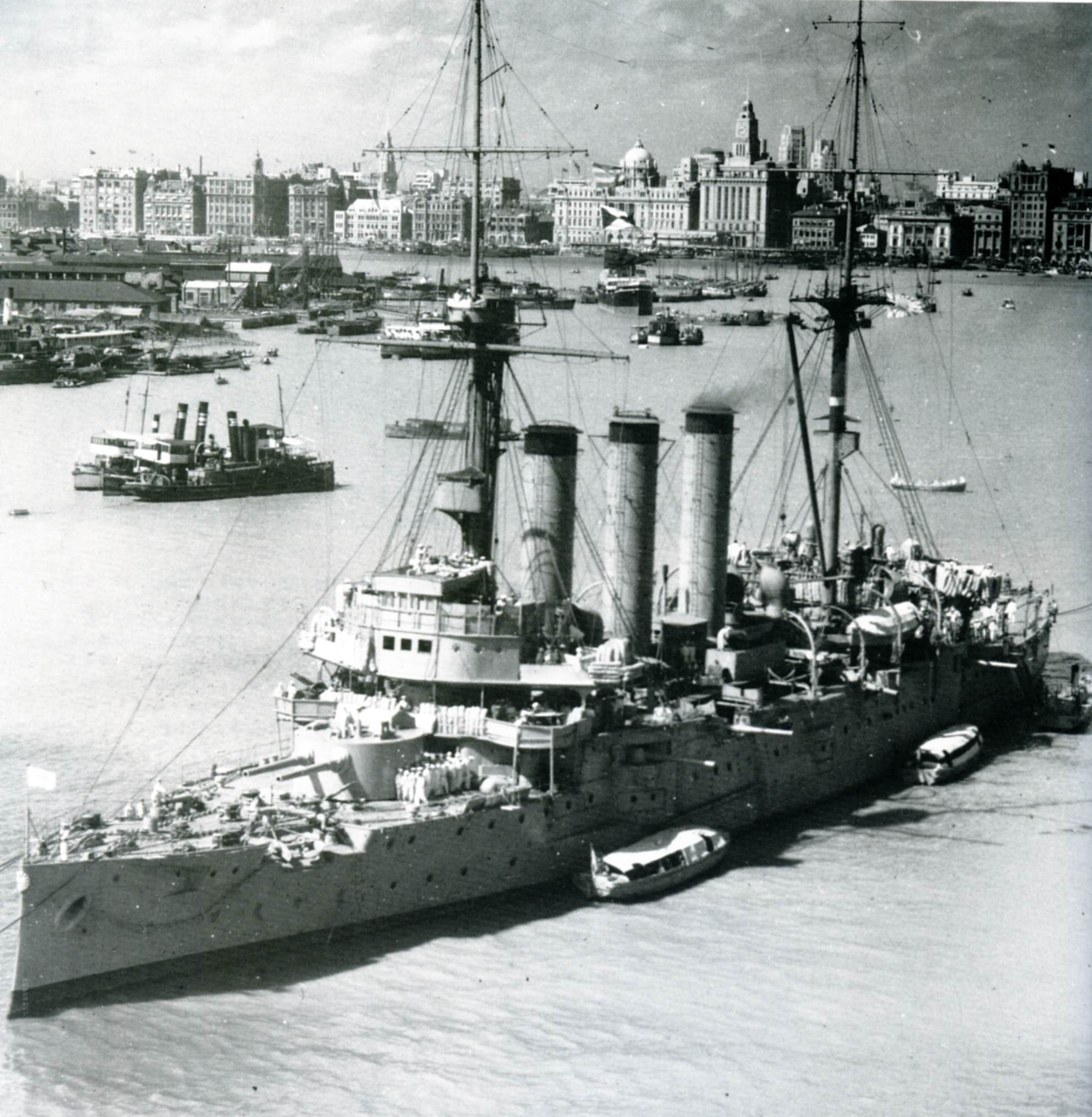
The Imperial Japanese Navy armored cruiser Izumo during the Battle of Shanghai

=== Contemporary events ===
Chinese Communist Party chairman Mao Zedong took staged swims in the river in 1956 and 1966 at Wuhan in publicity stunts to demonstrate his health, also starting a swimming craze through party propaganda.

In 2002, Danish adventurer and sailor Troels Kløvedal sailed up the Yangtze, from Shanghai to past the Three Gorges Dam, in the collectively owned "Nordkaperen" sailing ship. Kløvedal had spent 12 years preparing and gathering the required permissions, and with a crew of Danes, his family members, a Chinese interpreter and several local maritime pilots, he became the first foreigner since 1949 to navigate the Yangtze. His months-long journey was documented both in his 2004 book "Kineserne syr med lang tråd" and the TV show "Kløvedal i Kina" by DR.

The Jetour Zongheng G700 became the first land vehicle in history to successfully cross the Yangtze. The crossing took place on October 16, 2025, and took 22 minutes to complete.

== Hydrology ==
=== Periodic floods ===
Tens of millions of people live in the floodplain of the Yangtze valley, an area that naturally floods every summer and is habitable only because it is protected by river dikes. The floods large enough to overflow the dikes have caused great distress to those who live and farm there. Floods of note include those of 1931, 1954, and 1998.

The 1931 Central China floods or the Central China floods of 1931 were a series of floods that are generally considered among the deadliest natural disasters ever recorded, and almost certainly the deadliest of the 20th century (when pandemics and famines are discounted). Estimates of the total death toll range from 145,000 to between 3.7 million and 4 million. The Yangtze flooded again in 1935, causing great loss of life.

From June to September 1954, the Yangtze River Floods were a series of catastrophic floodings that occurred mostly in Hubei Province. Due to unusually high volume of precipitation as well as an extraordinarily long rainy season in the middle stretch of the Yangtze River late in the spring of 1954, the river started to rise above its usual level in around late June. Despite efforts to open three important flood gates to alleviate the rising water by diverting it, the flood level continued to rise until it hit the historic high of 44.67 m in Jingzhou, Hubei and 29.73 m in Wuhan. The number of dead from this flood was estimated at 33,000, including those who died of plague in the aftermath of the disaster.

The 1998 Yangtze River floods were a series of major floods that lasted from middle of June to the beginning of September 1998 along the Yangtze.

In the summer of 1998, China experienced massive flooding of parts of the Yangtze River, resulting in 3,704 dead, 15 million homeless and $26 billion in economic loss. Other sources report a total loss of 4150 people, and 180 million people were affected. A staggering 25 million acres (100,000 km^{2}) were evacuated, 13.3 million houses were damaged or destroyed. The floods caused $26 billion in damages.

The 2016 China floods caused US$22 billion in damages.

In 2020, the Yangtze river saw the heaviest rainfall since 1961, with a 79% increase in June and July compared to the average for the period over the previous 41 years. A new theory suggested that abrupt reduction in emissions of greenhouse gases and aerosols, caused by shutdowns during the COVID-19 pandemic, was a key cause of the intense downpours. Over the past decades rainfall had decreased due to increase of aerosols in the atmosphere, and lower greenhouse gas emissions in 2020 caused the opposite effect – a major increase in rain. Such a dramatic reduction of aerosols caused a dramatic change in the various components of the climate system, but such sudden change of the climate system would be very different from changes in response to continuous but gradual policy-driven emissions reductions.

=== Degradation of the river ===
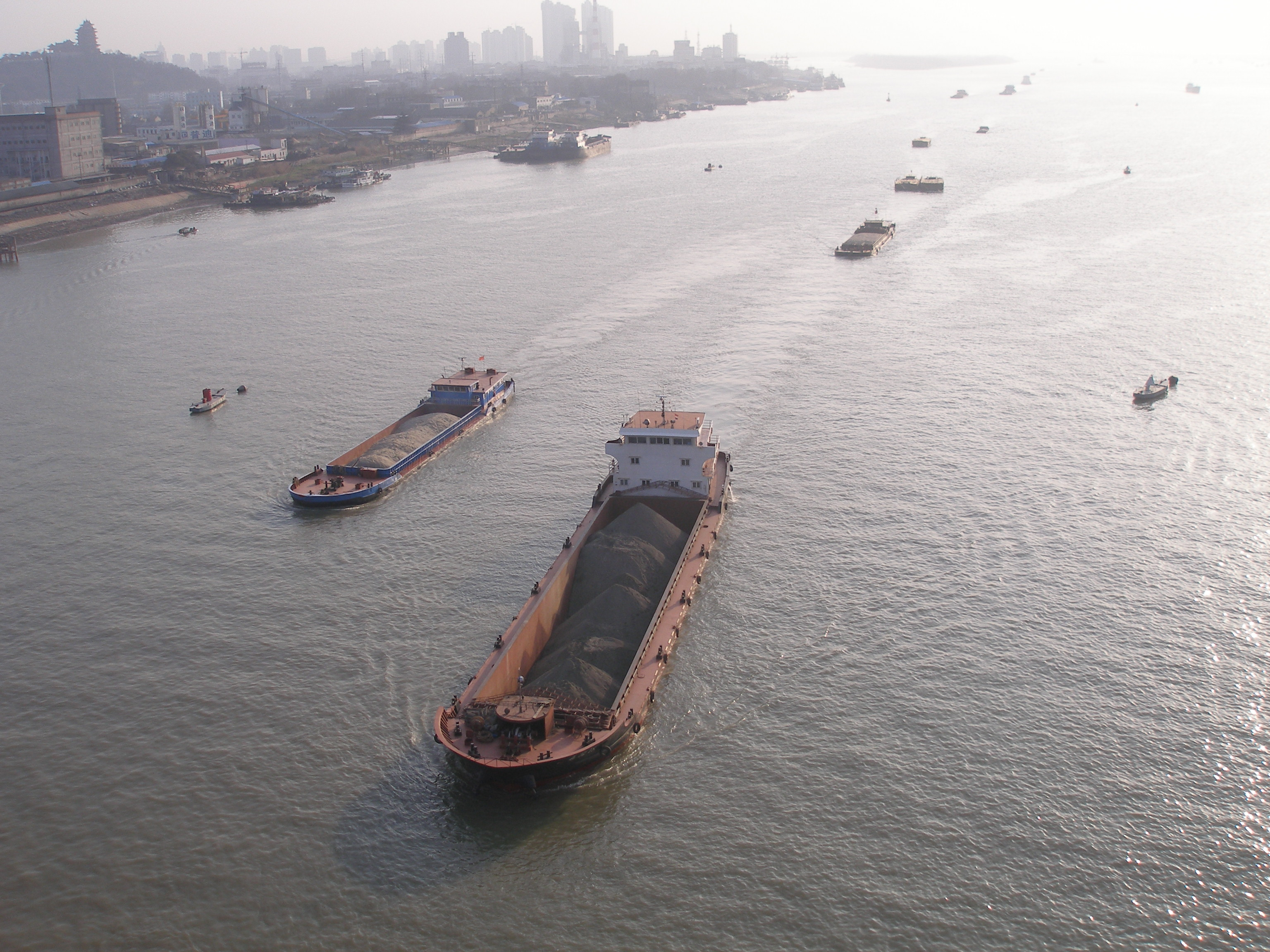
Barges on the river

Beginning in the 1950s, dams and dikes were built for flood control, land reclamation, irrigation, and control of diseases vectors such as blood flukes that caused Schistosomiasis. More than a hundred lakes were thusly cut off from the main river. There were gates between the lakes that could be opened during floods. However, farmers and settlements encroached on the land next to the lakes although it was forbidden to settle there. When floods came, it proved impossible to open the gates since it would have caused substantial destruction. Thus the lakes partially or completely dried up. For example, Baidang Lake shrunk from 100 square kilometers (39 sq mi) in the 1950s to 40 square kilometers (15 sq mi) in 2005. Zhangdu Lake dwindled to one quarter of its original size. Natural fisheries output in the two lakes declined sharply. Only a few large lakes, such as Poyang Lake and Dongting Lake, remained connected to the Yangtze. Cutting off the other lakes that had served as natural buffers for floods increased the damage done by floods further downstream. Furthermore, the natural flow of migratory fish was obstructed and biodiversity across the whole basin decreased dramatically. Intensive farming of fish in ponds spread using one type of carp who thrived in eutrophic water conditions and who feeds on algae, causing widespread pollution. The pollution was exacerbated by the discharge of waste from pig farms as well as of untreated industrial and municipal sewage. In September 2012, the Yangtze river near Chongqing turned red from pollution. The erection of the Three Gorges Dam has created an impassable "iron barrier" that has led to a great reduction in the biodiversity of the river. Yangtze sturgeon use seasonal changes in the flow of the river to signal when is it time to migrate. However, these seasonal changes will be greatly reduced by dams and diversions. Other animals facing immediate threat of extinction are the baiji dolphin, narrow-ridged finless porpoise and the Yangtze alligator. These animals numbers went into freefall from the combined effects of accidental catches during fishing, river traffic, habitat loss and pollution. In 2006 the baiji dolphin became extinct; the world lost an entire genus.

In 2020, a sweeping law was passed by the Chinese government to protect the ecology of the river. The new laws include strengthening ecological protection rules for hydropower projects along the river, banning chemical plants within 1 kilometer of the river, relocating polluting industries, severely restricting sand mining as well as a complete fishing ban on all the natural waterways of the river, including all its major tributaries and lakes.

=== Contribution to ocean pollution ===
The Yangtze River produces more ocean plastic pollution than any other, according to The Ocean Cleanup, a Dutch environmental research foundation that focuses on ocean pollution. Ten rivers transport 90% of all the plastic that reaches the oceans via rivers, with the Yangtze River being the biggest polluter.

=== Reconnecting lakes ===
In 2002 a pilot program was initiated to reconnect lakes to the Yangtze with the objective to increase biodiversity and to alleviate flooding. The first lakes to be reconnected, in 2004, were Zhangdu Lake, Honghu Lake, and Tian'e-Zhou in Hubei on the middle Yangtze. In 2005, Baidang Lake in Anhui was also reconnected.

Reconnecting the lakes improved water quality and fish were able to migrate from the river into the lake, replenishing their numbers and genetic stock. The trial also showed that reconnecting the lake reduced flooding. The new approach also benefitted the farmers economically. Pond farmers switched to natural fish feed, which helped them breed better-quality fish that can be sold for more, increasing their income by 30%. Based on the successful pilot project, other provincial governments emulated the experience and also reestablished connections to lakes that had previously been cut off from the river. In 2005 a Yangtze Forum has been established bringing together 13 riparian provincial governments to manage the river from source to sea. In 2006 China's Ministry of Agriculture made it a national policy to reconnect the Yangtze River with its lakes. As of 2010, provincial governments in five provinces and Shanghai set up a network of 40 effective protected areas, covering 16,500 km^{2} (6,400 sq mi). As a result, populations of 47 threatened species increased, including the critically endangered Yangtze alligator. In the Shanghai area, reestablished wetlands now protect drinking water sources for the city. It is envisaged to extend the network throughout the entire Yangtze to eventually cover 102 areas and 185,000 km^{2} (71,000 sq mi). The mayor of Wuhan announced that six huge, stagnating urban lakes including the East Lake (Wuhan) would be reconnected at the cost of US$2.3 billion creating China's largest urban wetland landscape.

=== Discharge ===
The Yangtze River is the longest and most economically important river in Asia and the fifth largest in the world in terms of flow. It is also the largest river entirely within a single country. Its estuary had an estimated annual flow of 995.8 cubic kilometers per year (31,550 m^{3}/s) between 1955 and 2021. The last gauging station on the river is at Datong (30°50′57.9192″N 117°43′47.4096″E). At this location, the water flow is regularly monitored. The chart below is based on average flows between 1950 and 2020.

1950–1969
Year	Average discharge (m^{3}/s)
1950	30,880
1951	26,167
1952	33,456
1953	28,272
1954	43,062
1955	29,215
1956	26,388
1957	25,696
1958	26,860
1959	24,500
1960	24,282
1961	27,800
1962	29,403
1963	27,455
1964	32,513
1965	27,581
1966	24,376
1967	27,675
1968	29,340
1969	27,518

1970–1989
Year	Average discharge (m^{3}/s)
1970	31,100
1971	22,680
1972	22,021
1973	33,706
1974	26,450
1975	31,444
1976	26,262
1977	28,617
1978	21,415
1979	22,962
1980	32,065
1981	28,340
1982	30,737
1983	35,822
1984	28,178
1985	26,591
1986	23,190
1987	27,342
1988	27,596
1989	31,093

1990–2009
Year	Average discharge (m^{3}/s)
1990	27,430
1991	28,813
1992	25,325
1993	31,516
1994	24,697
1995	31,672
1996	30,133
1997	24,602
1998	45,970
1999	34,752
2000	28,908
2001	23,064
2002	32,489
2003	28,593
2004	23,283
2005	33,589
2006	17,376
2007	22,497
2008	25,640
2009	23,032

2010–2020
Year	Average discharge (m^{3}/s)
2010	37,266
2011	15,962
2012	36,386
2013	23,220
2014	29,567
2015	30,824
2016	33,878
2017	30,186
2018	21,150
2019	29,163
2020	34,763

== Major cities along the river ==
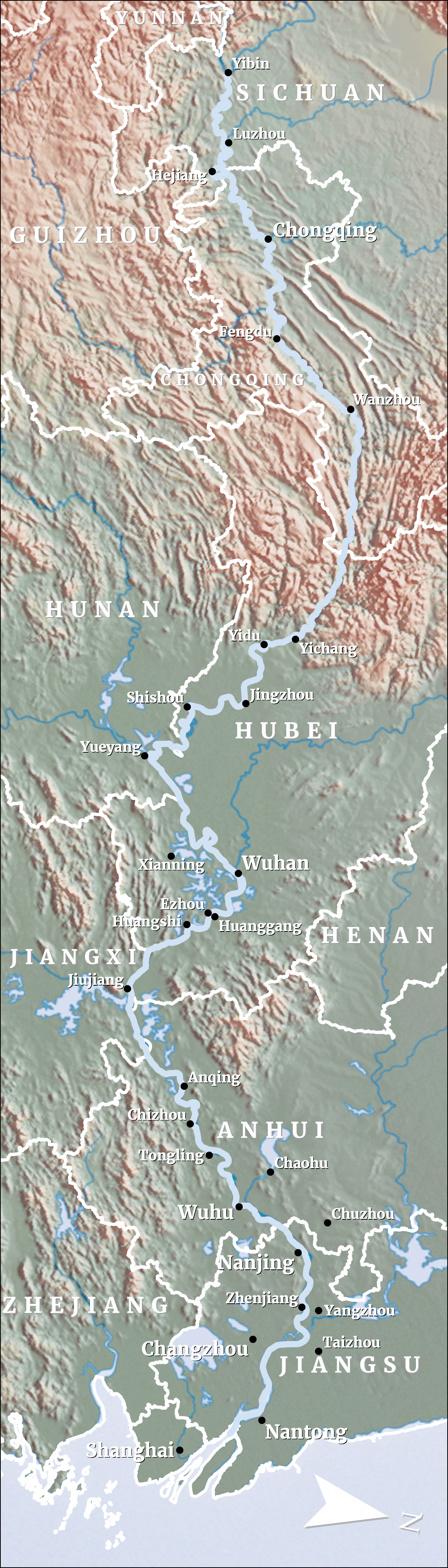
Map of the Yangtze River (facing west) showing the major settlements along its banks

- Qinghai
  - Yushu
- Sichuan
  - Panzhihua
  - Yibin
  - Luzhou
    - Hejiang
- Chongqing
  - Fuling
  - Fengdu
  - Wanzhou
- Hubei
  - Yichang
    - Yidu
  - Jingzhou
    - Shashi
    - Shishou
  - Xianning
  - Wuhan
  - Ezhou
  - Huangshi
  - Huanggang
- Hunan
  - Yueyang
- Anhui
  - Chizhou
- Jiangxi
  - Jiujiang
- Anhui
  - Anqing
  - Tongling
  - Wuhu
  - Ma'anshan
- Jiangsu
  - Nanjing
  - Yangzhou
  - Zhenjiang
  - Taizhou
  - Changzhou
  - Nantong
- Shanghai
- Enters East China Sea

== Crossings ==
Until 1957, there were no bridges across the Yangtze River from Yibin to Shanghai. For millennia, travelers crossed the river by ferry. On occasions, the crossing may have been dangerous, as evidenced by the Zhong'anlun disaster (October 15, 1945).

The river stood as a major geographic barrier dividing northern and southern China. In the first half of the 20th century, rail passengers from Beijing to Guangzhou and Shanghai had to disembark, respectively, at Hanyang and Pukou, and cross the river by steam ferry before resuming journeys by train from Wuchang or Nanjing West.

After the founding of the People's Republic in 1949, Soviet engineers assisted in the design and construction of the Wuhan Yangtze River Bridge, a dual-use road-rail bridge, built from 1955 to 1957. It was the first bridge across the Yangtze River. The second bridge across the river that was built was a single-track railway bridge built upstream in Chongqing in 1959. The Nanjing Yangtze River Bridge, also a road-rail bridge, was the first bridge to cross the lower reaches of the Yangtze, in Nanjing. It was built after the Sino-Soviet Split and did not receive foreign assistance. Road-rail bridges were then built in Zhicheng (1971) and Chongqing (1980).

Bridge-building slowed in the 1980s before resuming in the 1990s and accelerating in the first decade of the 21st century. The Jiujiang Yangtze River Bridge was built in 1992 as part of the Beijing–Jiujiang Railway. A second bridge in Wuhan was completed in 1995. By 2005, there were a total of 56 bridges and one tunnel across the Yangtze River between Yibin and Shanghai. These include some of the longest suspension and cable-stayed bridges in the world, on the Yangtze Delta: Jiangyin Suspension Bridge (1,385 m (4,544 ft), opened in 1999), Runyang Bridge (1,490 m (4,890 ft), opened 2005), Sutong Bridge (1,088 m (3,570 ft)m, opened 2008). The rapid pace of bridge construction has continued. The city of Wuhan now has six bridges and one tunnel across the Yangtze.

A number of power line crossings have also been built across the river.

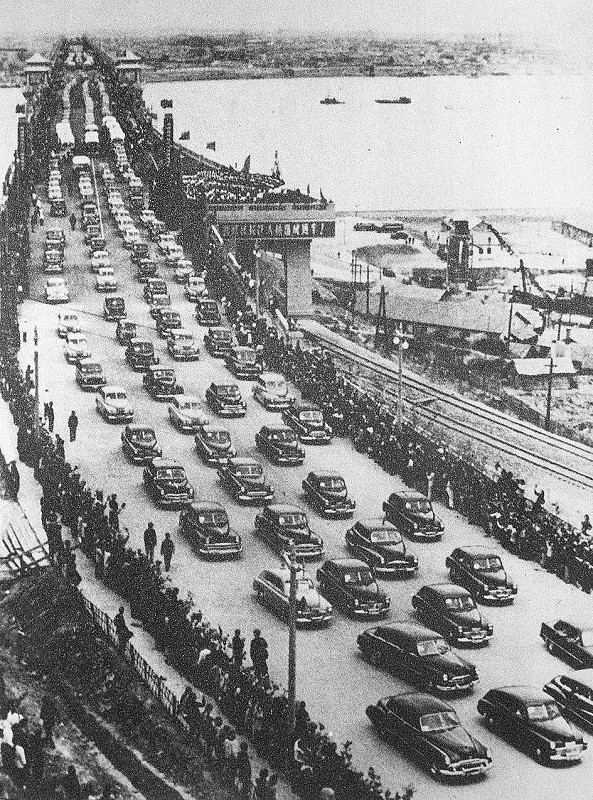
Wuhan Yangtze River Bridge, the first bridge crossing Yangtze, was completed in 1957.

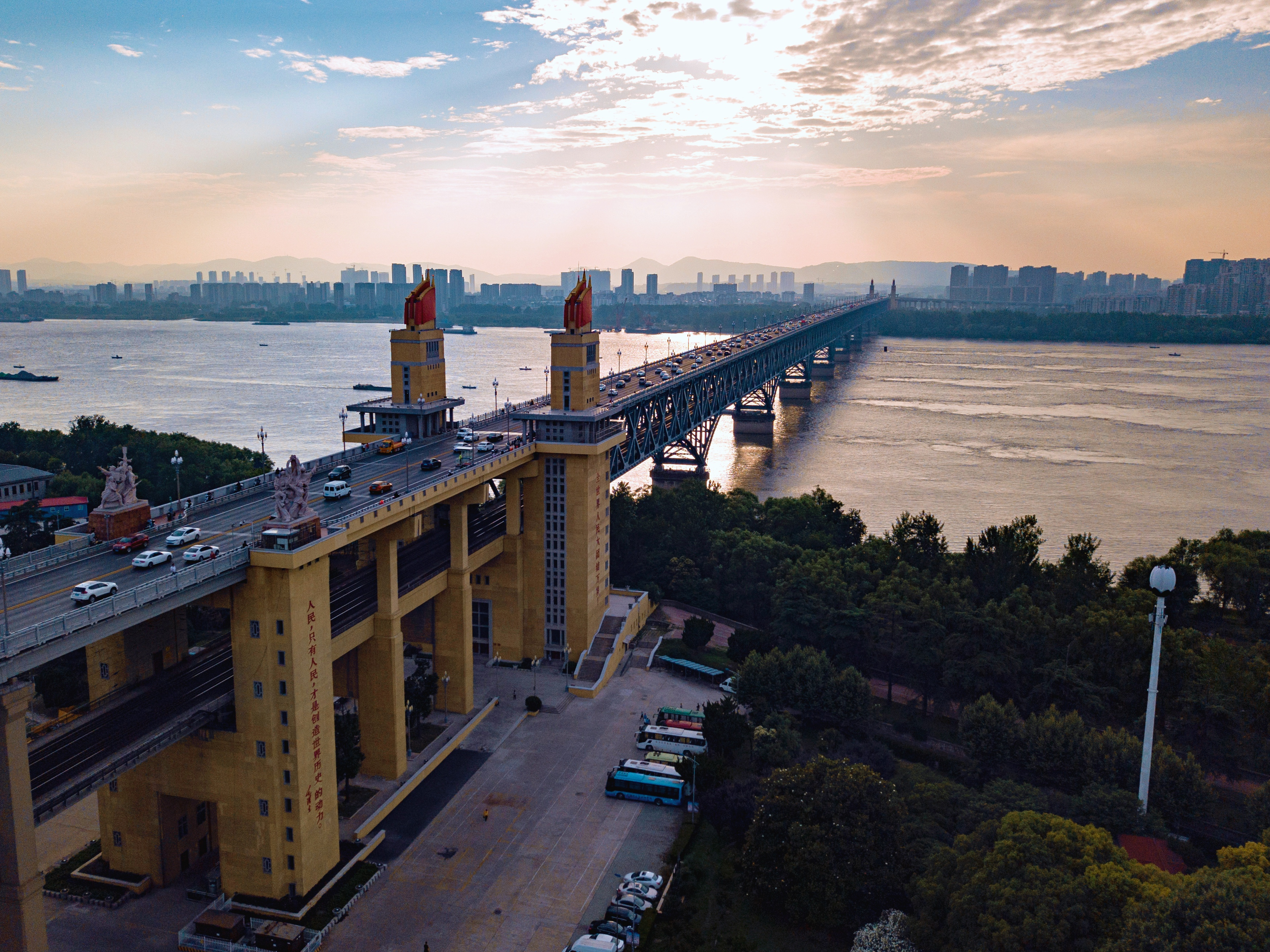
The Nanjing Yangtze River Bridge, a beam bridge, was completed in 1968.

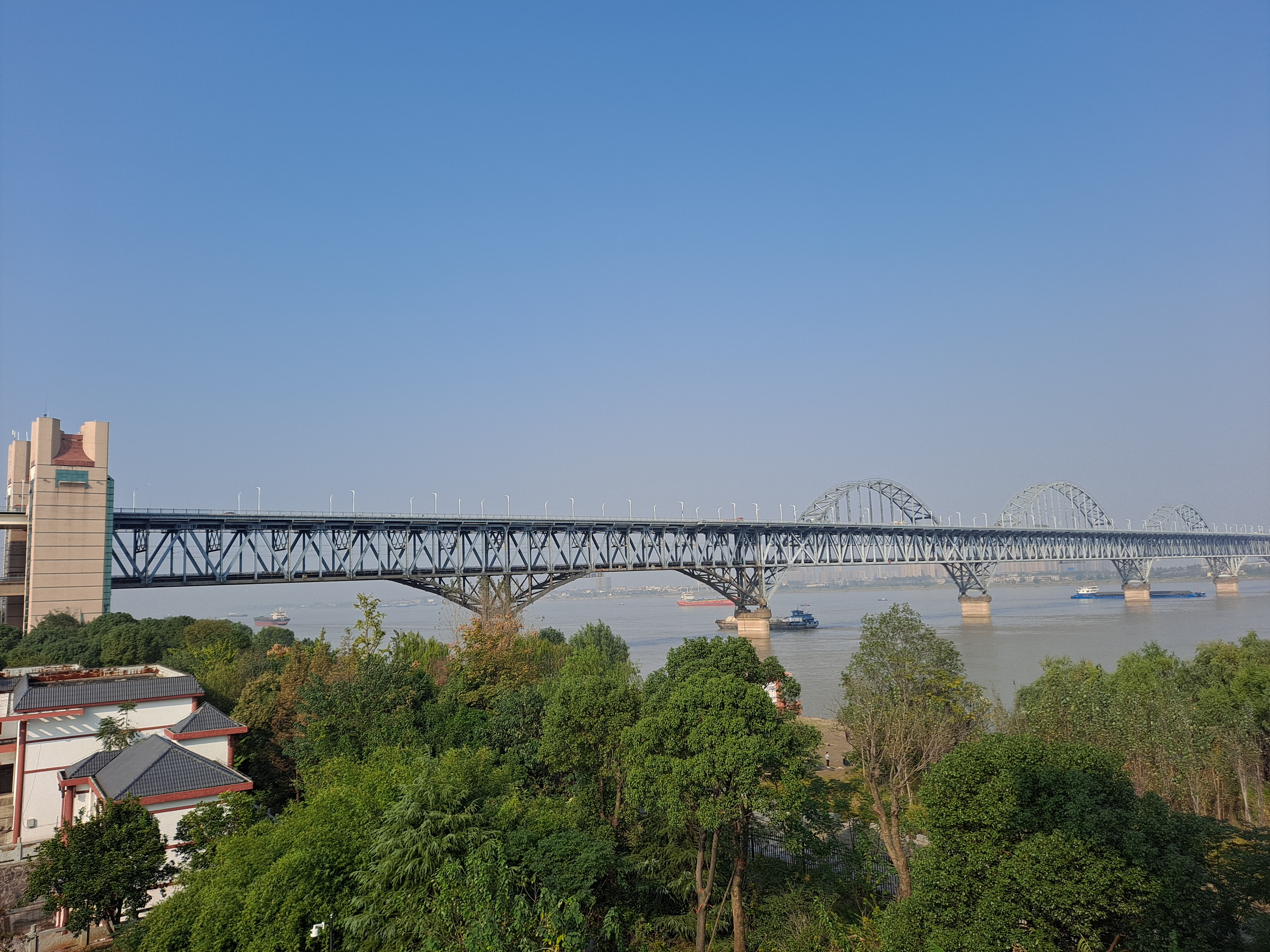
The Jiujiang Yangtze River Bridge, an arch bridge, was completed in 1992.

The Yichang Yangtze Highway Bridge, a suspension bridge near the Gezhouba Dam lock, was completed in 1996.

The Sutong Yangtze River Bridge, between Nantong and Suzhou, was one of the longest cable-stayed bridges in the world when it was completed in 2008.

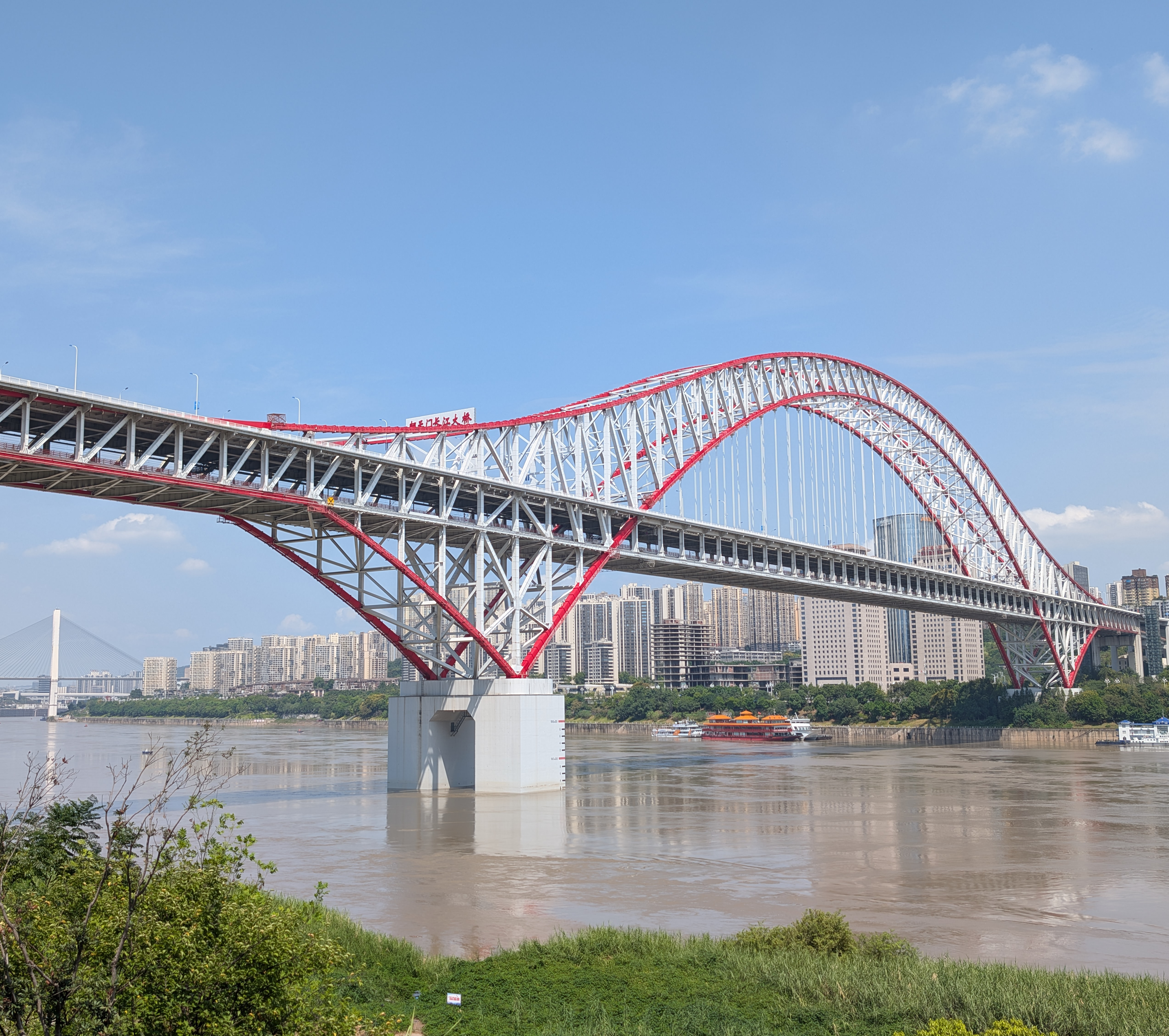
The Chaotianmen Bridge, an arch bridge in Chongqing, was completed in 2009.

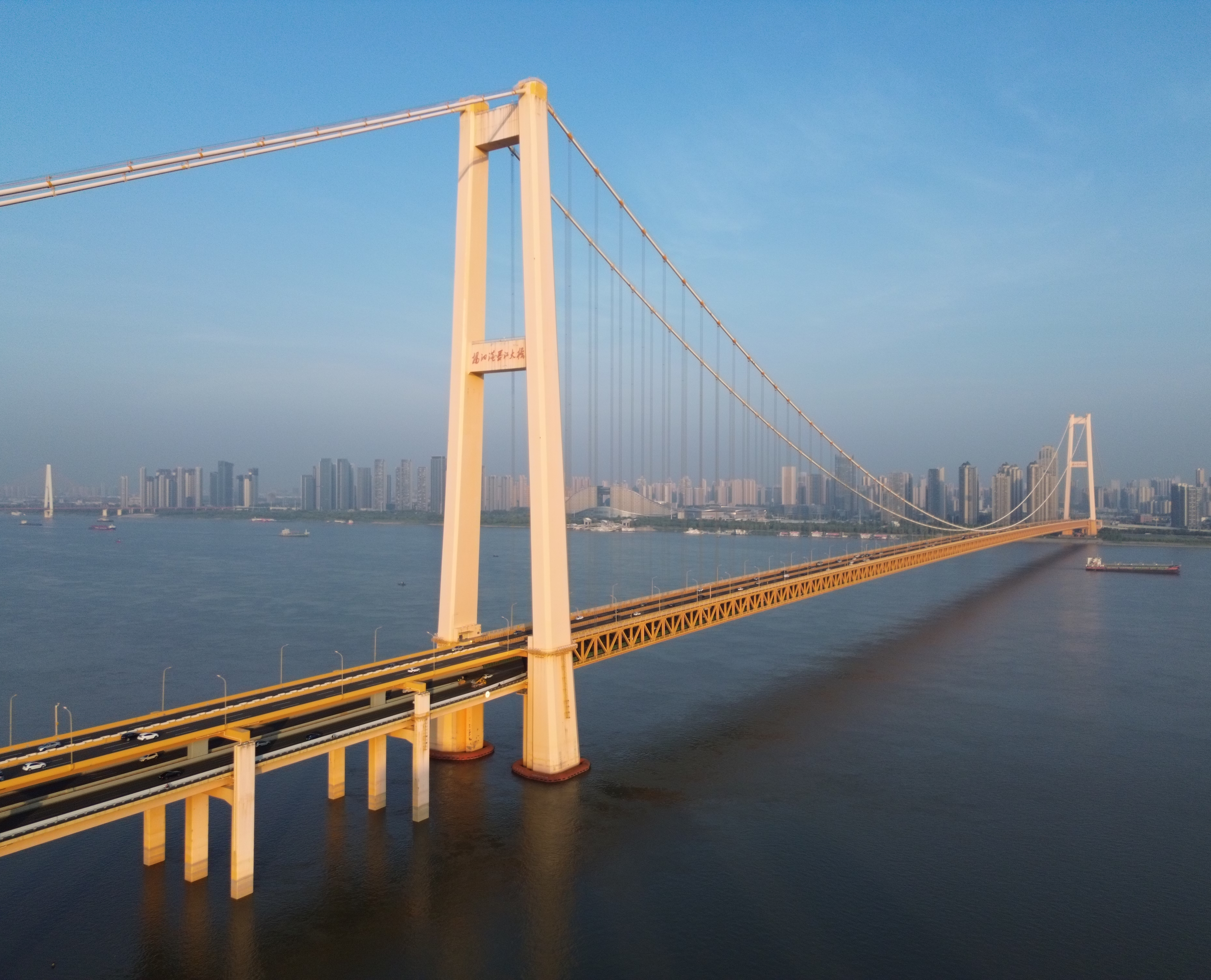
The Yangsigang Yangtze River Bridge in Wuhan, was completed in 2019.

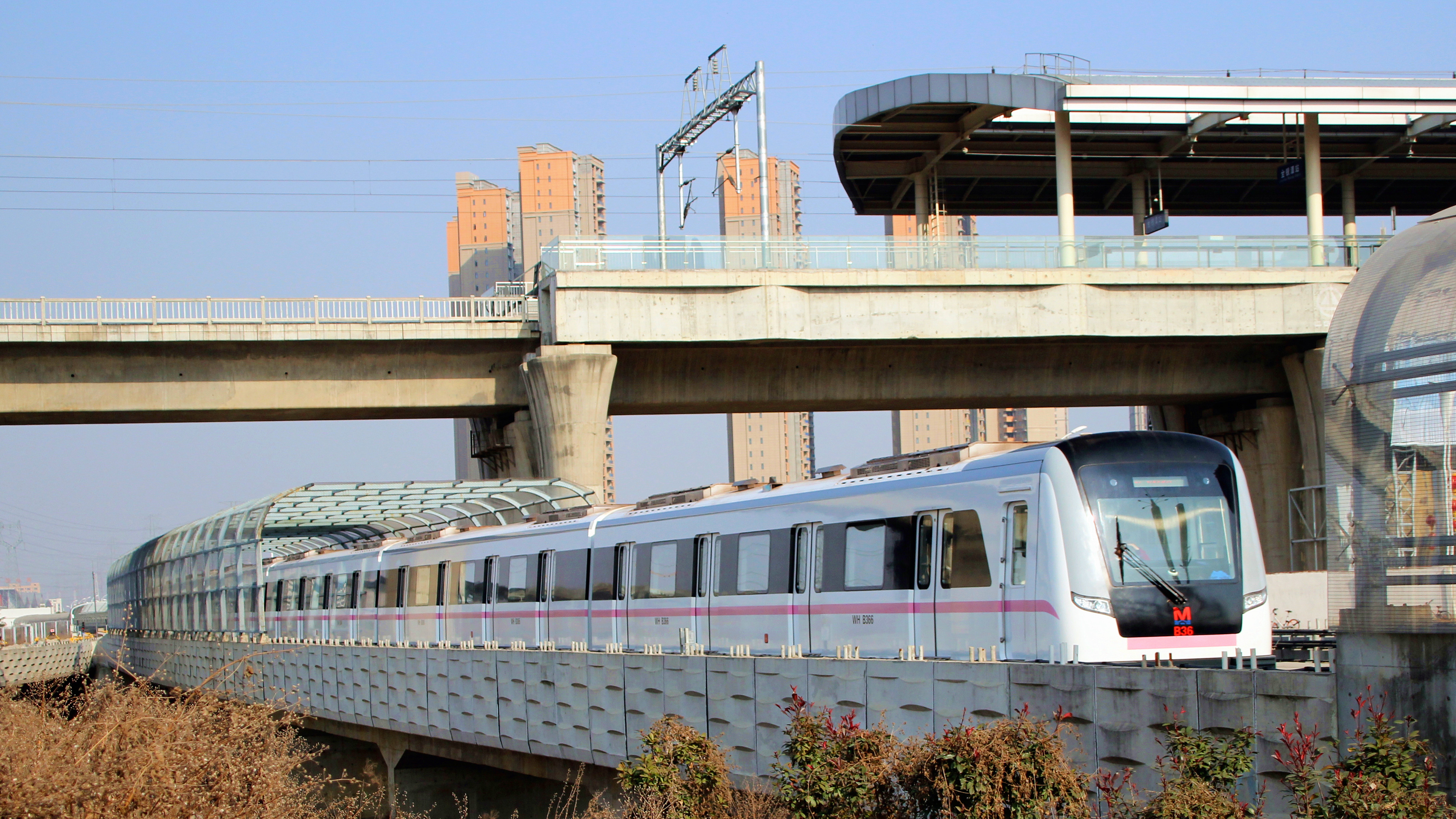
Wuhan Metro Line 2 is the first underground rail line crossing the Yangtze River.

== Dams ==
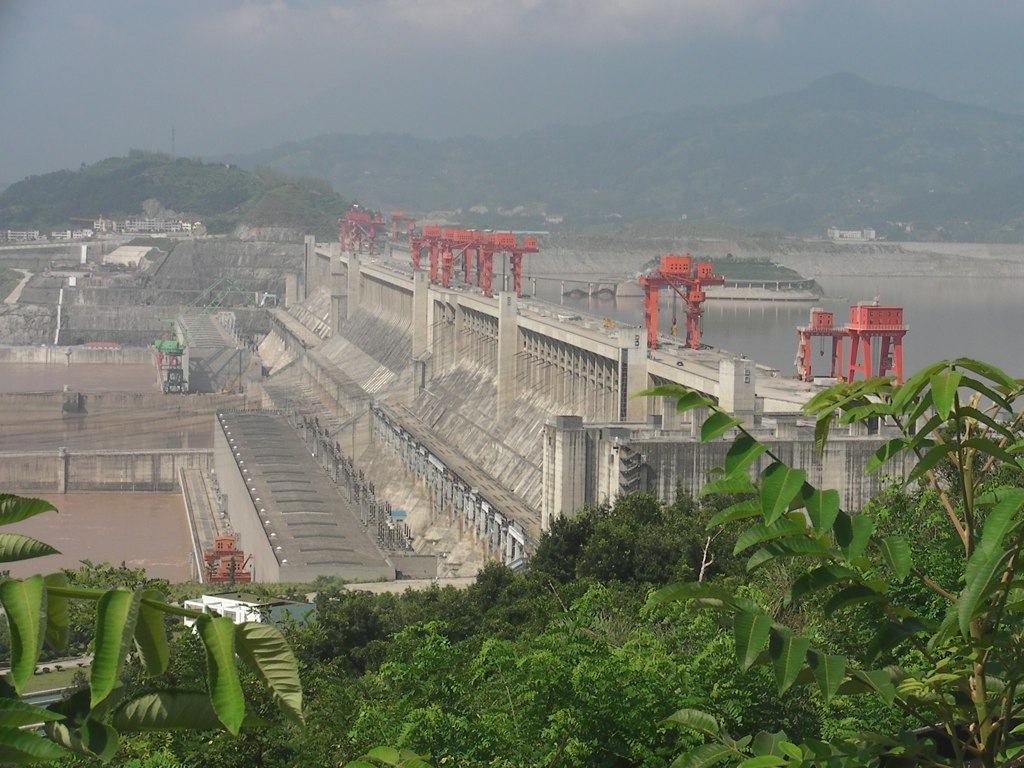
The Three Gorges Dam in 2006

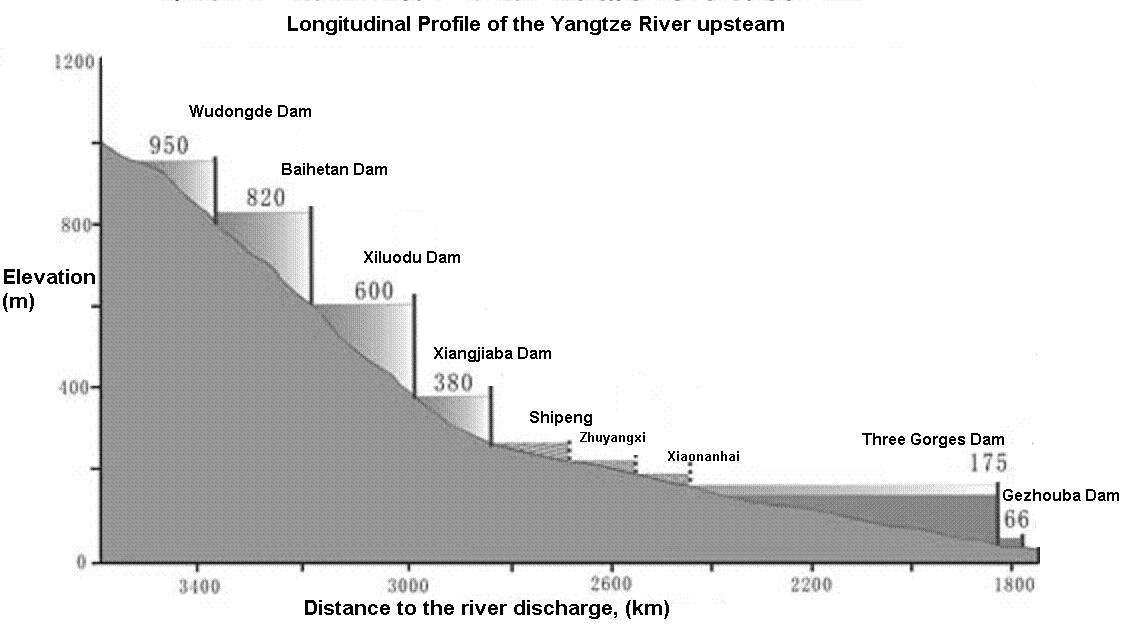
Diagram showing dams planned for the upper reaches of the Yangtze River

As of 2007, there are two dams built on the Yangtze River: Three Gorges Dam and Gezhouba Dam. The Three Gorges Dam is the largest power station in the world by installed capacity, at 22.5 GW. Several dams are operating or are being constructed on the upper portion of the river, the Jinsha River. Among them, the Baihetan Dam is the second largest after the Three Gorges Dam, and the Xiluodu Dam is the 4th largest power station in the world.

== Tributaries ==
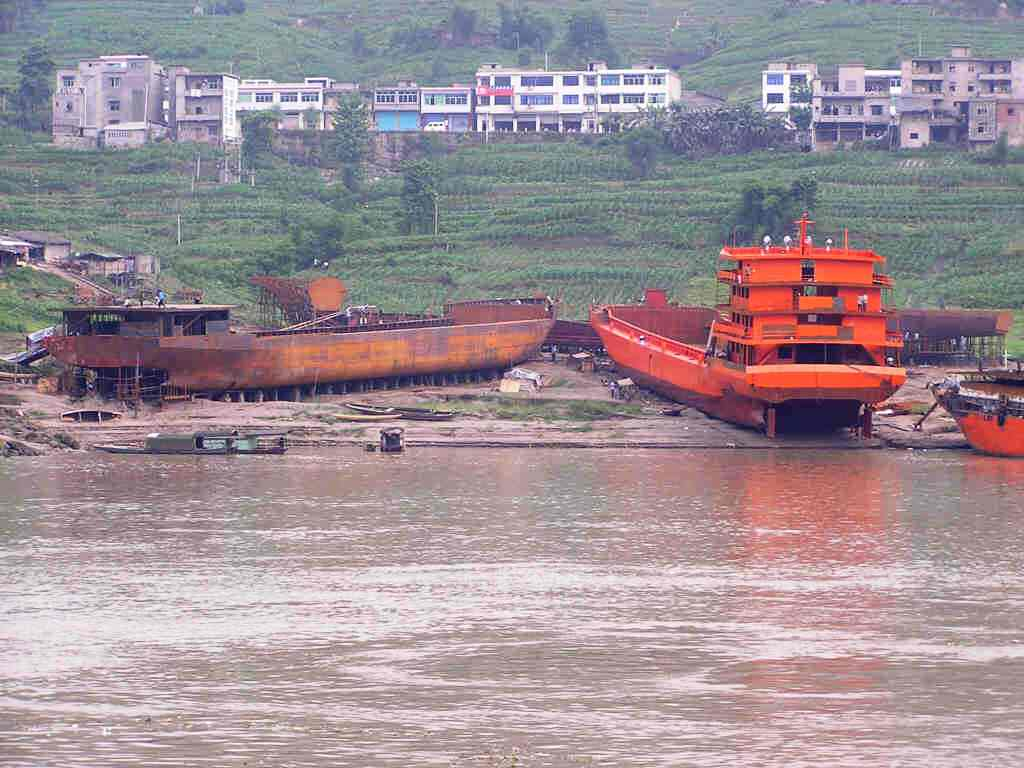
A shipyard on the banks of the Yangtze building commercial river freight boats

The Yangtze River has over 700 tributaries. The major tributaries (listed from upstream to downstream) with the locations of where they join the Yangtze are:

- Yalong River (Panzhihua, Sichuan)
- Min River (Yibin, Sichuan)
- Tuo River (Luzhou, Sichuan)
- Chishui River (Hejiang, Sichuan)
- Jialing River (Chongqing)
- Wu River (Fuling, Chongqing)
- Qing River (Yidu, Hubei)
- Yuan River (via Dongting Lake)
- Lishui River (via Dongting Lake)
- Zi River (via Dongting Lake)
- Xiang River (Yueyang, Hunan)
- Han River (Wuhan, Hubei)
- Gan River (near Jiujiang, Jiangxi)
- Shuiyang River (Dangtu, Anhui)
- Qingyi River (Wuhu, Anhui)
- Chao Lake water system (Chaohu, Anhui)
- Lake Tai water system (Shanghai)

The Huai River flowed into the Yellow Sea until the 20th century, but now primarily discharges into the Yangtze.

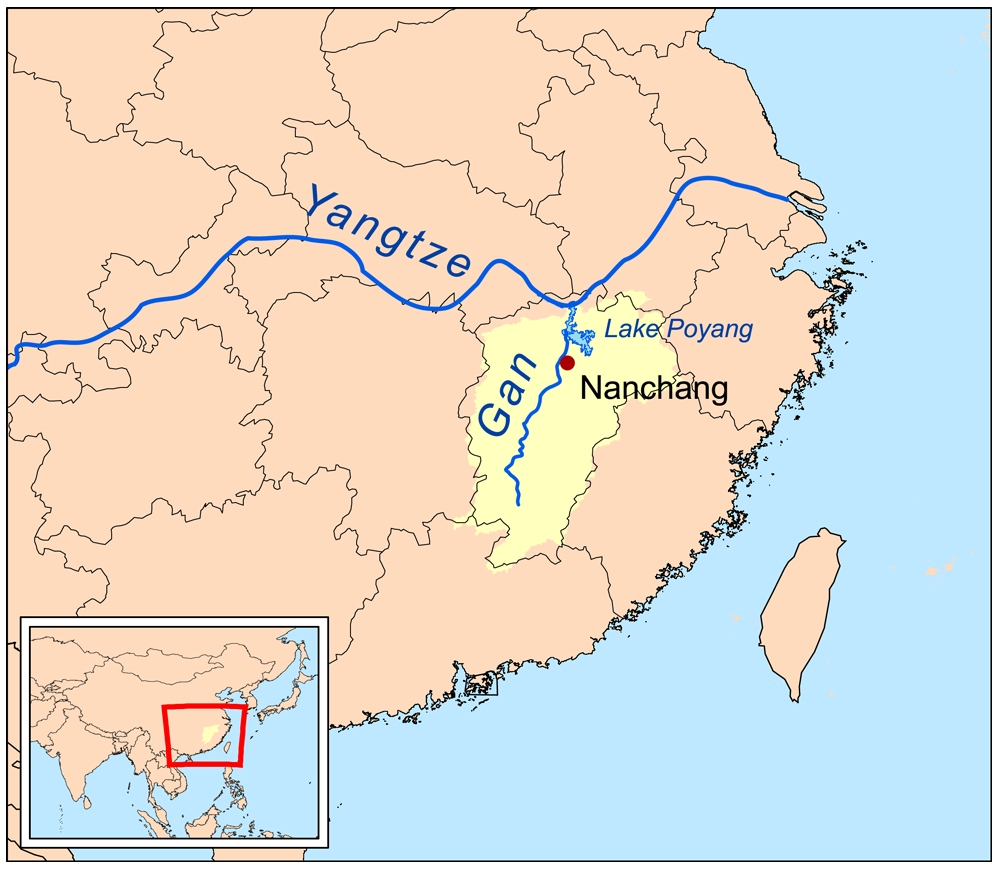
Gan River in Jiangxi

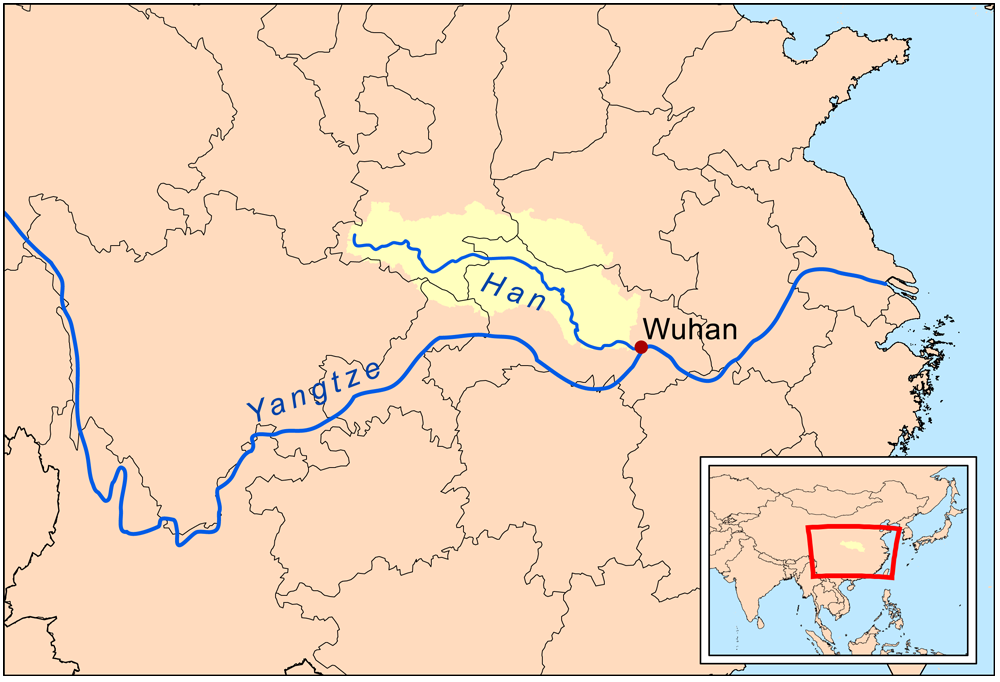
Han River in Hubei

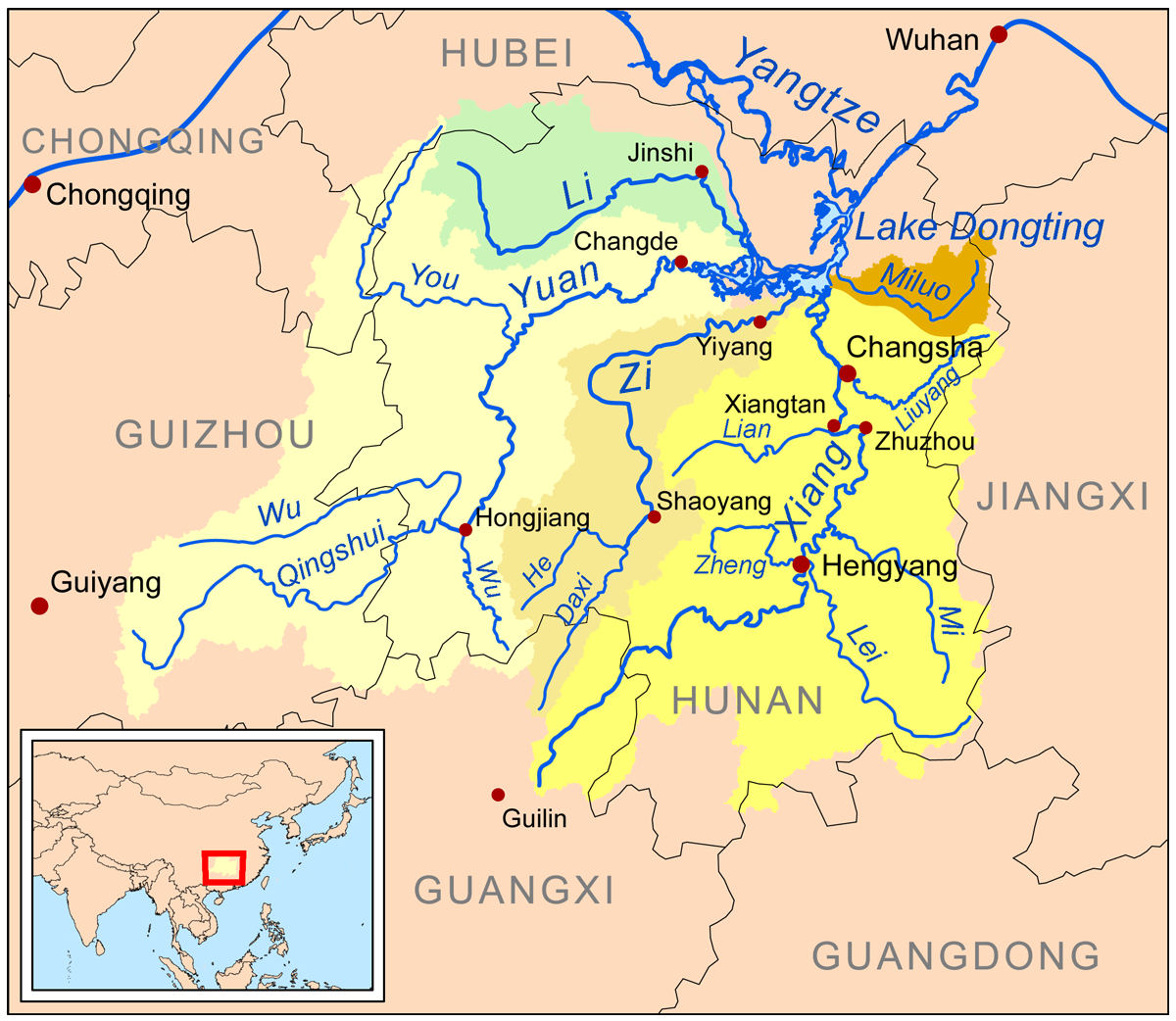
Lake Dongting and the Yuan, Zi, Li, and Xiang Rivers in Hunan

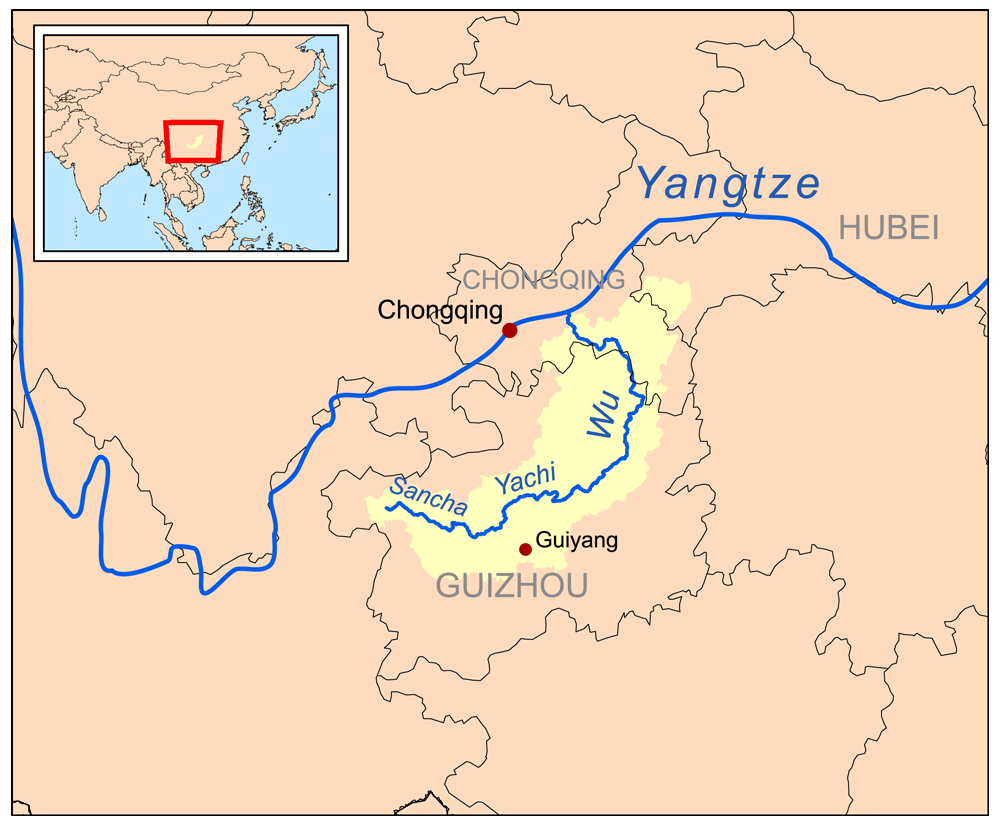
Wu River in Guizhou

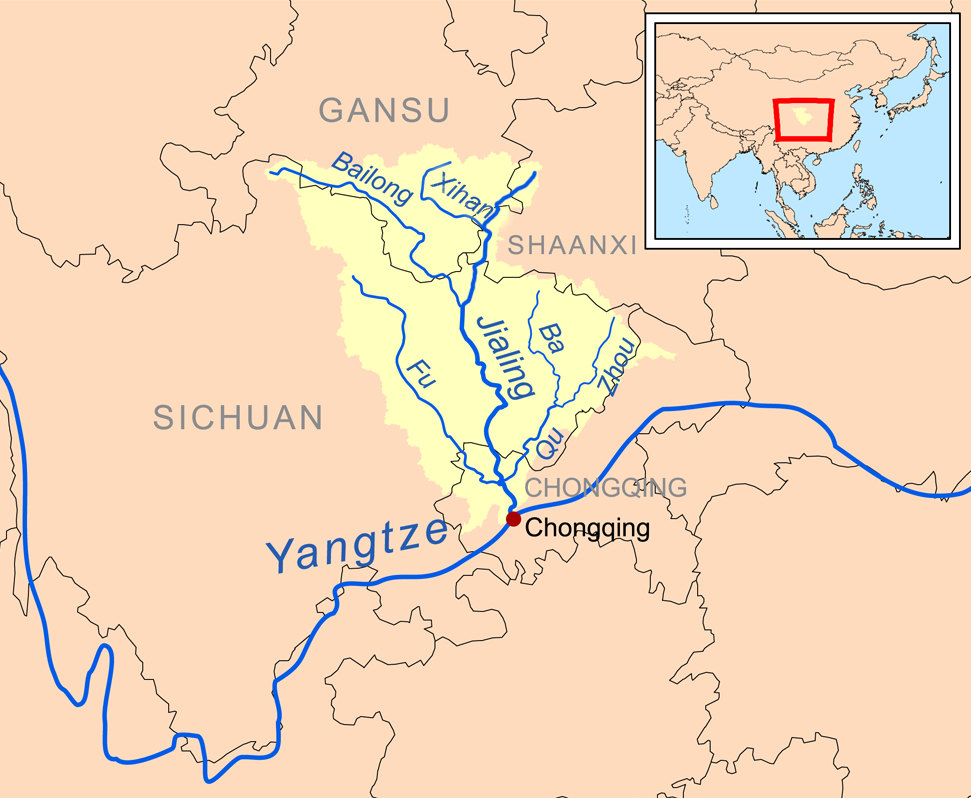
Jialing River in eastern Sichuan and Chongqing Municipality

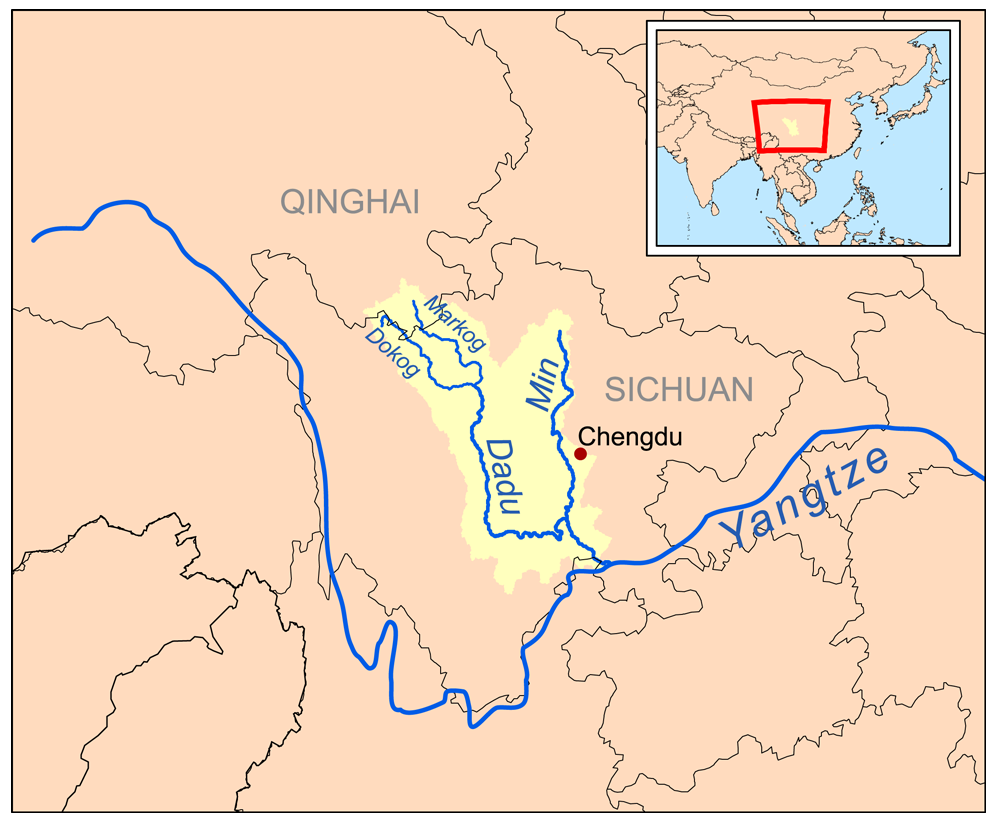
Min River in central Sichuan

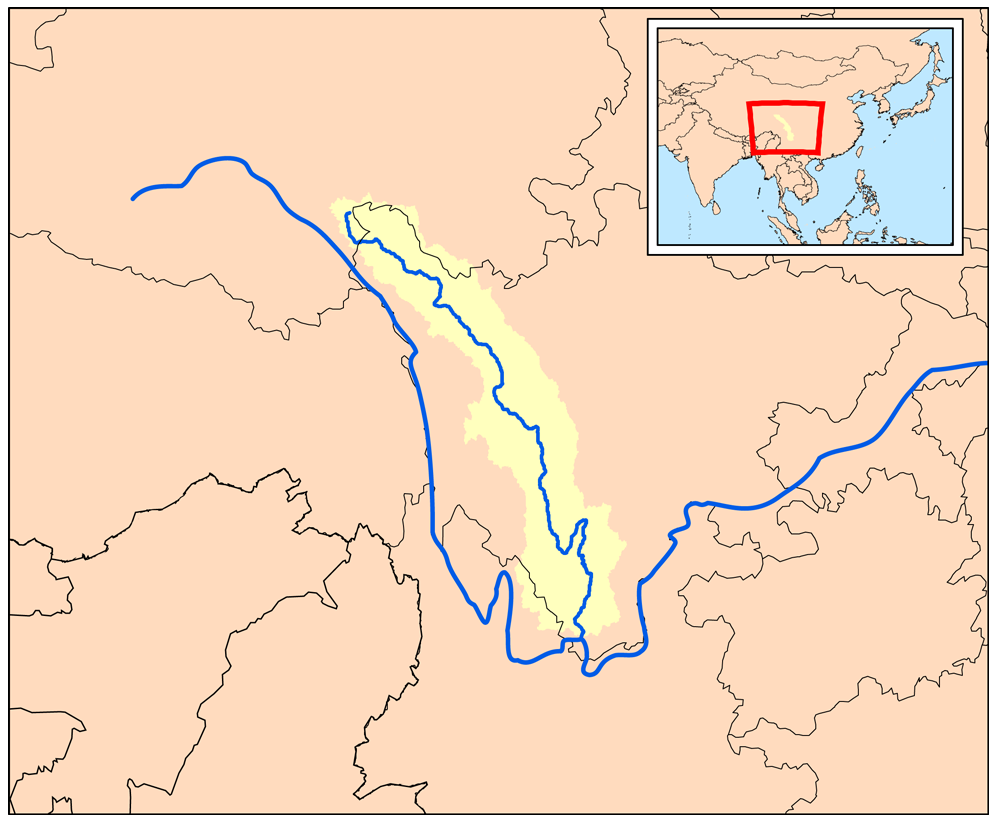
Yalong River in western Sichuan

== Protected areas ==
- Sanjiangyuan ("Three Rivers' Sources") National Nature Reserve in Qinghai
- Three Parallel Rivers of Yunnan

== Wildlife ==
The Yangtze River has a high species richness, including many endemics. A high percentage of these are seriously threatened by human activities.

=== Fish ===
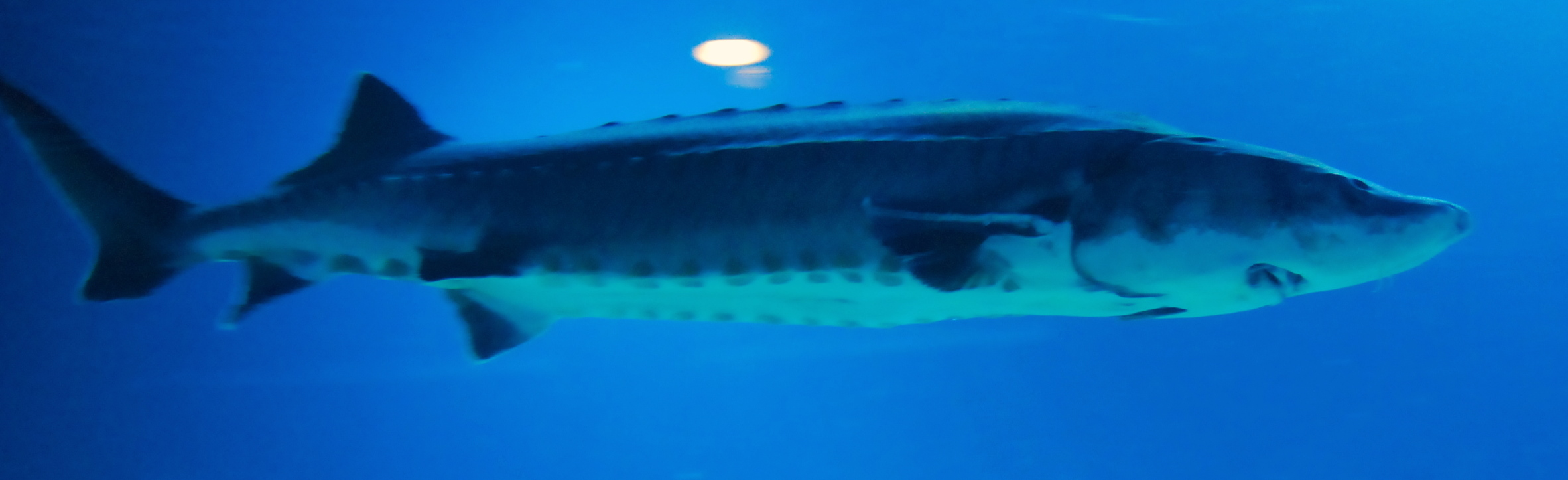
The two sturgeon species in the Yangtze (here Chinese sturgeon) are both seriously threatened.

As of 2011, 416 fish species are known from the Yangtze basin, including 362 that strictly are freshwater species. The remaining are also known from salt or brackish waters, such as the river's estuary or the East China Sea. This makes it one of the most species-rich rivers in Asia and by far the most species-rich in China (in comparison, the Pearl River has almost 300 fish species and the Yellow River 160). 178 fish species are endemic to the Yangtze River Basin. Many are only found in some section of the river basin and especially the upper reach (above Yichang, but below the headwaters in the Qinghai-Tibet Plateau) is rich with 279 species, including 147 Yangtze endemics and 97 strict endemics (found only in this part of the basin). In contrast, the headwaters, where the average altitude is above 4,500 m (14,800 ft), are only home to 14 highly specialized species, but 8 of these are endemic to the river. The largest orders in the Yangtze are Cypriniformes (280 species, including 150 endemics), Siluriformes (40 species, including 20 endemics), Perciformes (50 species, including 4 endemics), Tetraodontiformes (12 species, including 1 endemic) and Osmeriformes (8 species, including 1 endemic). No other order has more than four species in the river and one endemic.

Many Yangtze fish species have declined drastically and 65 were recognized as threatened in the 2009 Chinese red list. Among these are three that are considered entirely extinct (Chinese paddlefish, Anabarilius liui liui and Atrilinea macrolepis), two that are extinct in the wild (Anabarilius polylepis, Schizothorax parvus), four that are critically endangered Euchiloglanis kishinouyei, Megalobrama elongata, Schizothorax longibarbus and Leiocassis longibarbus). Additionally, both the Yangtze sturgeon and Chinese sturgeon are considered critically endangered by the IUCN. The survival of these two sturgeon may rely on the continued release of captive bred specimens. Although still listed as critically endangered rather than extinct by both the Chinese red list and IUCN, recent reviews have found that the Chinese paddlefish is extinct. Surveys conducted between 2006 and 2008 by ichthyologists failed to catch any, but two probable specimens were recorded with hydroacoustic signals. The last definite record was an individual that was accidentally captured near Yibin in 2003 and released after having been radio tagged. The Chinese sturgeon is the largest fish in the river and among the largest freshwater fish in the world, reaching a length of 5 m (16 ft); the extinct Chinese paddlefish reputedly reached as much as 7 m (23 ft), but its maximum size is labeled with considerable uncertainty.

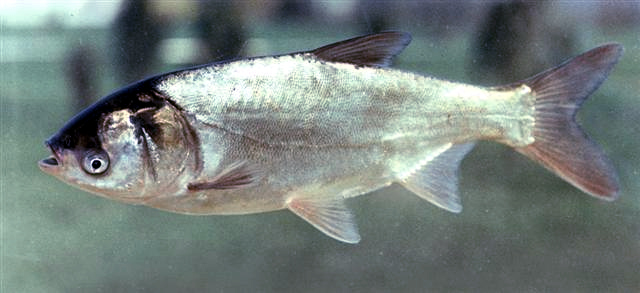
The silver carp is native to the river, but has (like other Asian carp) been spread through large parts of the world with aquaculture.

The largest threats to the Yangtze native fish are overfishing and habitat loss (such as building of dams and land reclamation), but pollution, destructive fishing practices (such as fishing with dynamite or poison) and introduced species also cause problems. About 2/3 of the total freshwater fisheries in China are in the Yangtze Basin, but a drastic decline in size of several important species has been recorded, as highlighted by data from lakes in the river basin. In 2015, some experts recommend a 10-year fishing moratorium to allow the remaining populations to recover, and in January 2020 China imposed a 10-year fishing moratorium on 332 sites along the Yangtze. Dams present another serious problem, as several species in the river perform breeding migrations and most of these are non-jumpers, meaning that normal fish ladders designed for salmon are ineffective. For example, the Gezhouba Dam blocked the migration of the paddlerfish and two sturgeon, while also effectively splitting the Chinese high fin banded shark population into two and causing the extirpation of the Yangtze population of the Japanese eel. In an attempt of minimizing the effect of the dams, the Three Gorges Dam has released water to mimic the (pre-dam) natural flooding and trigger the breeding of carp species downstream. In addition to dams already built in the Yangtze basin, several large dams are planned and these may present further problems for the native fauna.

While many fish species native to the Yangtze are seriously threatened, others have become important in fish farming and introduced widely outside their native range. A total of 26 native fish species of the Yangtze basin are farmed. Among the most important are four Asian carp: grass carp, black carp, silver carp and bighead carp. Other species that support important fisheries include northern snakehead, Chinese perch, Takifugu pufferfish (mainly in the lowermost sections) and predatory carp.

=== Other animals ===
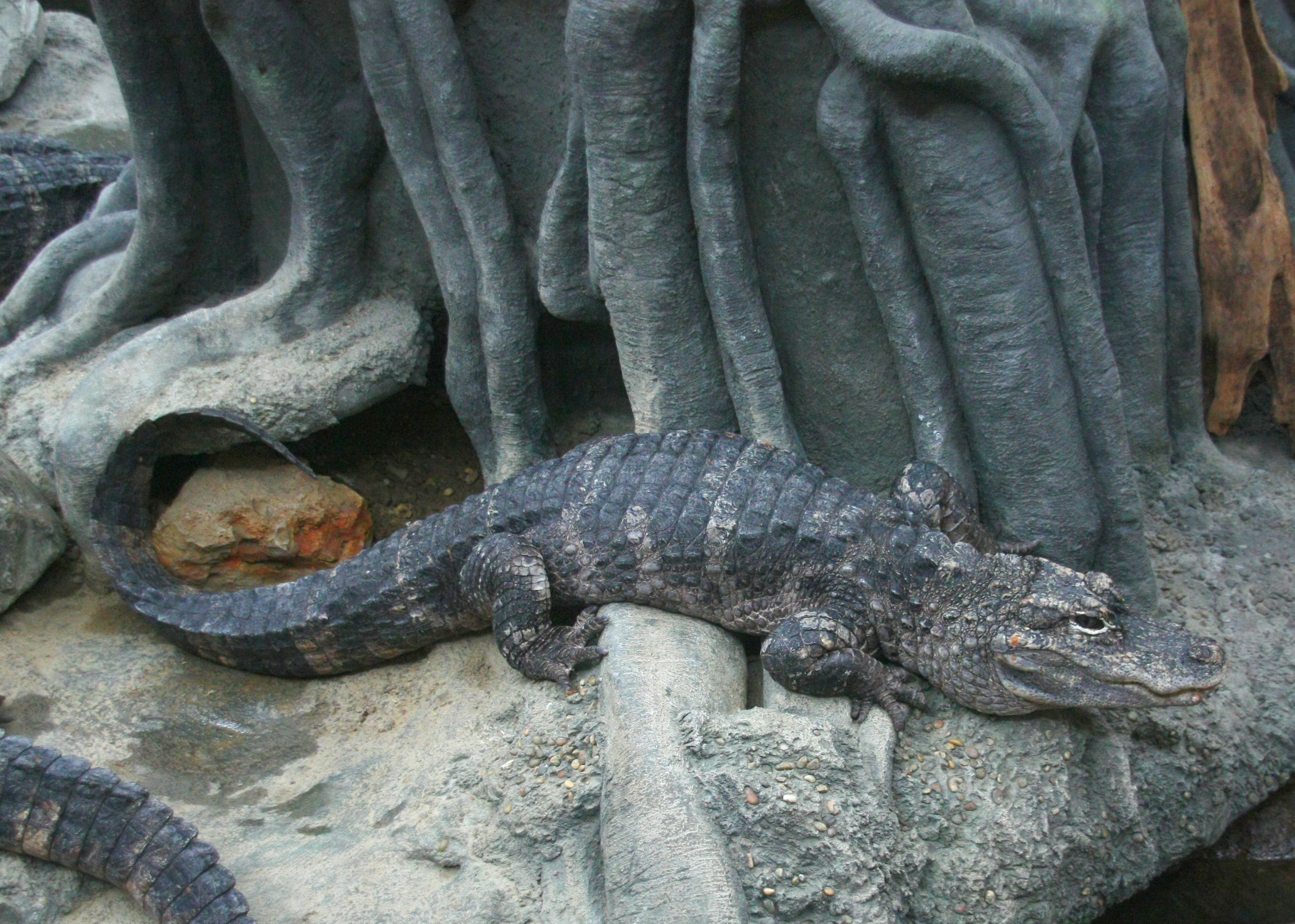
The critically endangered Chinese alligator is one of the smallest crocodilians, reaching a maximum length of about 2 m (7 ft).

Due to commercial use of the river, tourism, and pollution, the Yangtze is home to several seriously threatened species of large animals (in addition to fish): the narrow-ridged finless porpoise, baiji (Yangtze river dolphin), Chinese alligator, Yangtze giant softshell turtle and Chinese giant salamander. This is the only other place besides the United States that is native to an alligator and paddlefish species. In 2010, the Yangtze population of finless porpoise was 1000 individuals. In December 2006, the Yangtze river dolphin was declared functionally extinct after an extensive search of the river revealed no signs of the dolphin's inhabitance. In 2007, a large, white animal was sighted and photographed in the lower Yangtze and was tentatively presumed to be a baiji. However, as there have been no confirmed sightings since 2004, the baiji is presumed to be functionally extinct at this time. "Baijis were the last surviving species of a large lineage dating back seventy million years and one of only six species of freshwater dolphins." It has been argued that the extinction of the Yangtze river dolphin was a result of the completion of the Three Gorges Dam, a project that has affected many species of animals and plant life found only in the gorges area.

Numerous species of land mammals are found in the Yangtze valley, but most of these are not directly associated with the river. Three exceptions are the semi-aquatic Eurasian otter, water deer and Père David's deer.

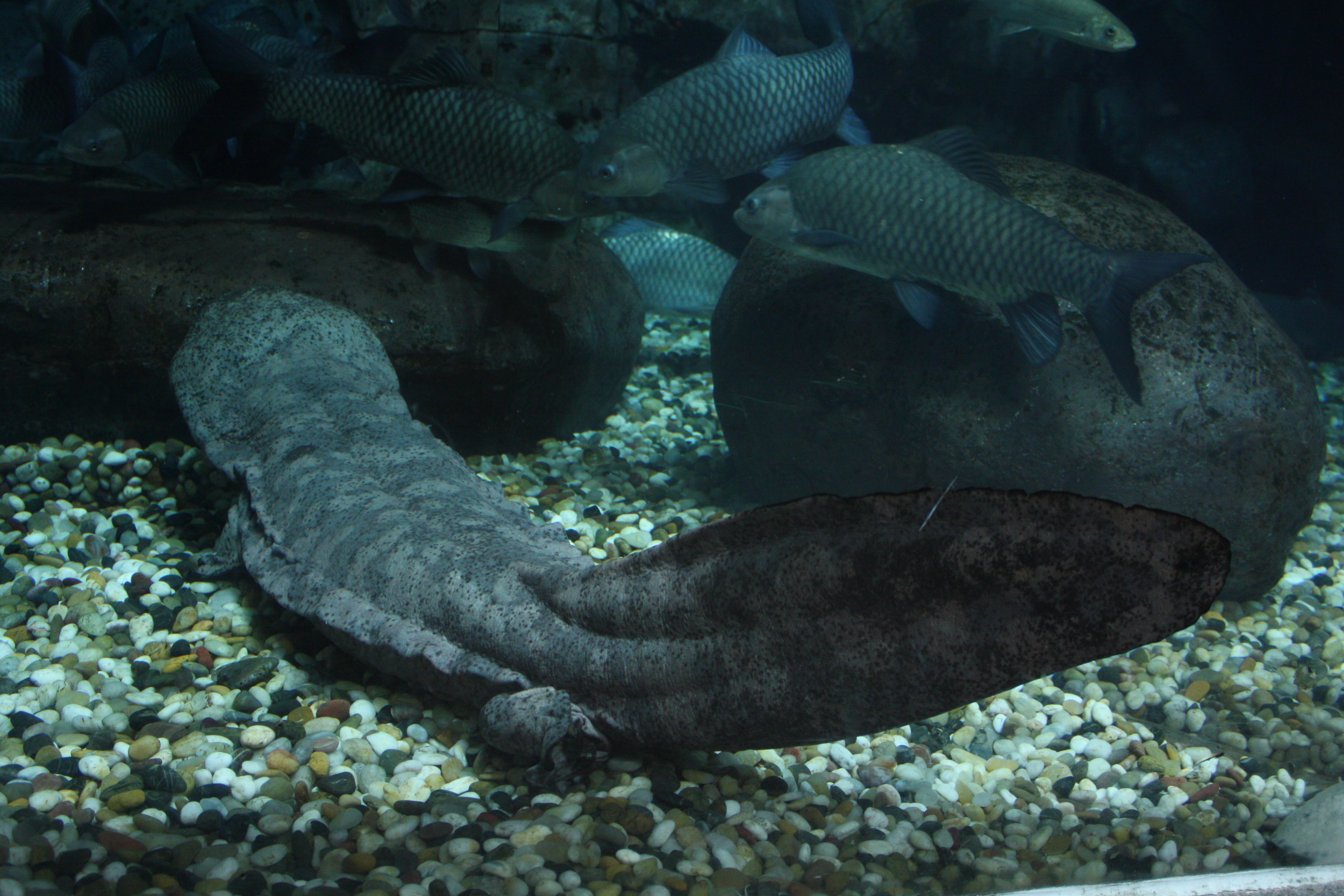
The entirely aquatic Chinese giant salamander is the world's largest amphibian, reaching up to 1.8 m (5.9 ft) in length.

In addition to the very large and exceptionally rare Yangtze giant softshell turtle, several smaller turtle species are found in the Yangtze basin, its delta and valleys. These include the Chinese box turtle, yellow-headed box turtle, Pan's box turtle, Yunnan box turtle, yellow pond turtle, Chinese pond turtle, Chinese stripe-necked turtle and Chinese softshell turtle, which all are considered threatened.

More than 160 amphibian species are known from the Yangtze basin, including the world's largest, the critically endangered Chinese giant salamander. It has declined drastically due to hunting (it is considered a delicacy), habitat loss and pollution. The polluted Dian Lake, which is part of the upper Yangtze watershed (via Pudu River), is home to several highly threatened fish, but was also home to the Yunnan lake newt. This newt has not been seen since 1979 and is considered extinct. In contrast, the Chinese fire belly newt from the lower Yangtze basin is one of the few Chinese salamander species to remain common and it is considered least concern by the IUCN.

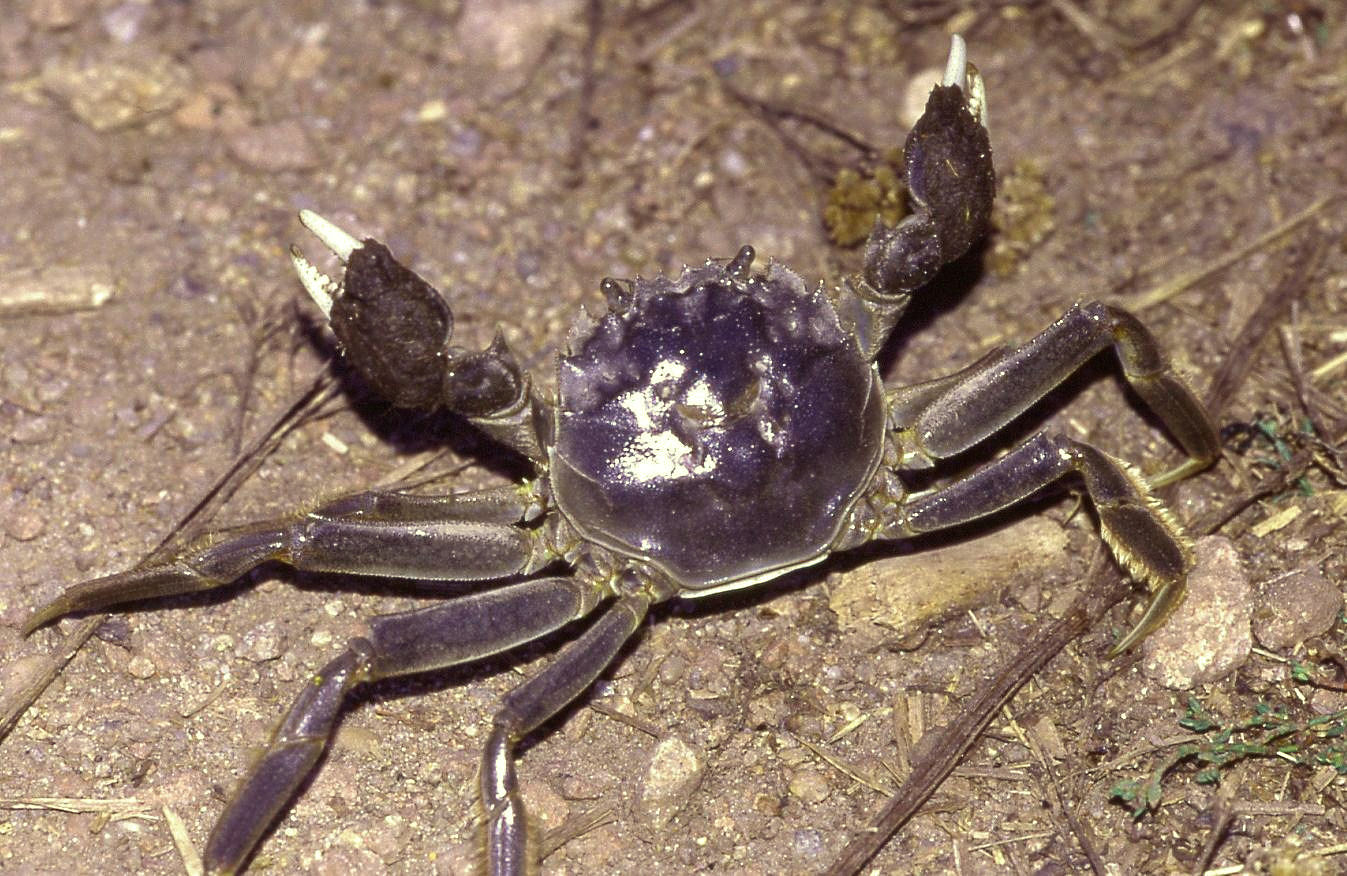
The Chinese mitten crab is a commercially important species in the Yangtze, but invasive in other parts of the world.

The Yangtze basin contains a large number of freshwater crab species, including several endemics. A particularly rich genus in the river basin is the potamid Sinopotamon. The Chinese mitten crab is catadromous (migrates between fresh and saltwater) and it has been recorded up to 1,400 km (870 mi) up the Yangtze, which is the largest river in its native range. It is a commercially important species in its native range where it is farmed, but the Chinese mitten crab has also been spread to Europe and North America where considered invasive.

The freshwater jellyfish Craspedacusta sowerbii, now an invasive species in large parts of the world, originates from the Yangtze.

== Tourism ==
The Yangtze River cruise, also called the "Three Gorges cruise", is a popular tourist attraction.

== Gallery ==
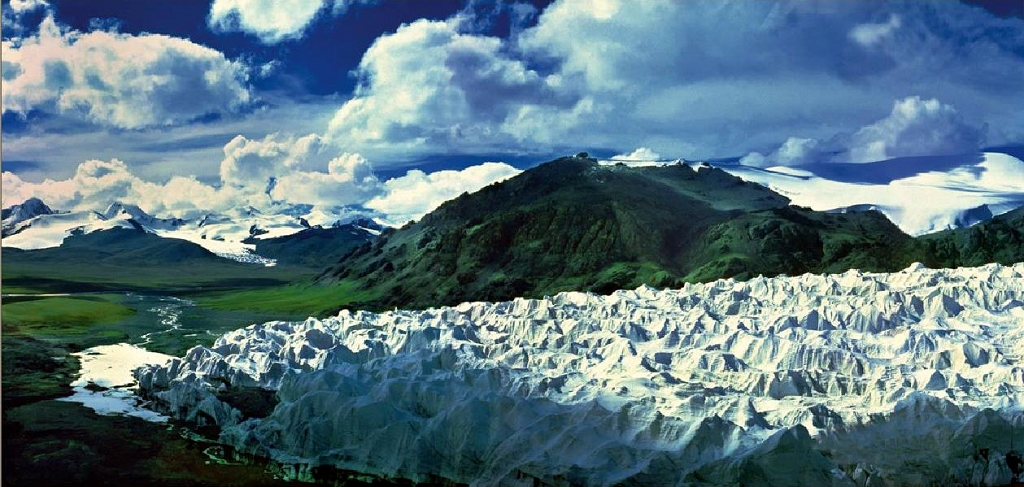
The glaciers of the Tanggula Mountains, the traditional source of the Yangtze River

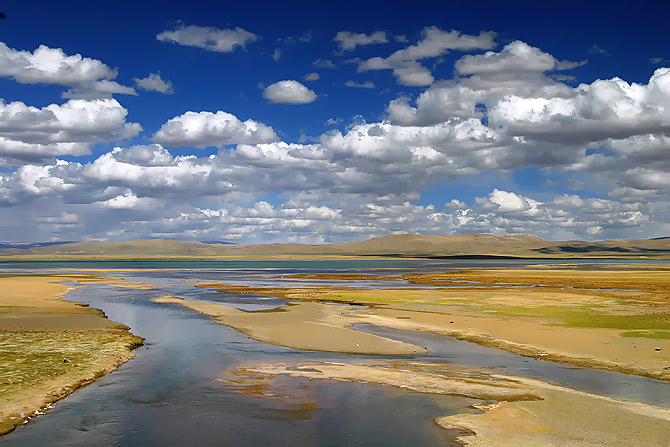
The Tuotuo River, a headwater stream of the Yangtze River, known in Tibetan as Maqu, or the "Red River"

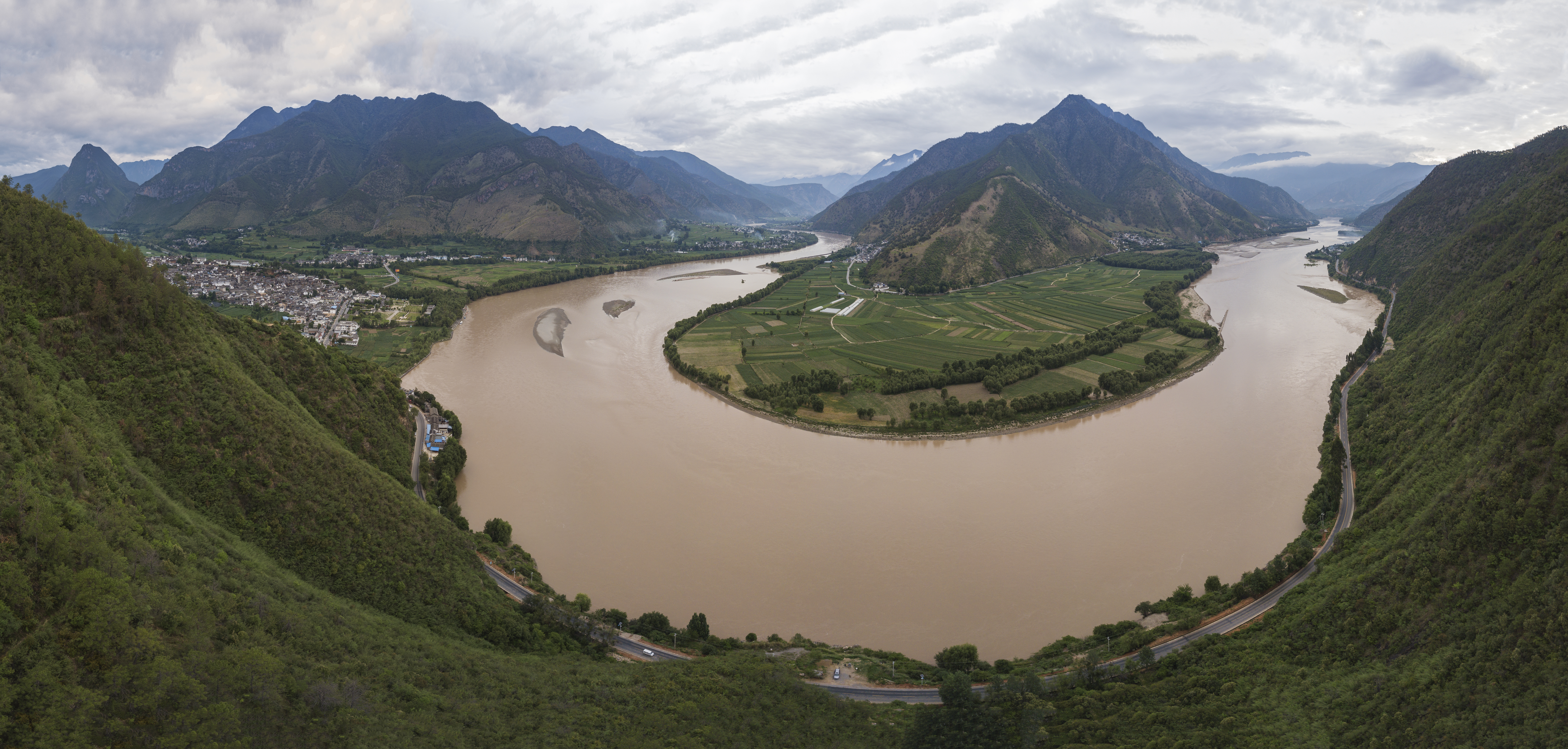
The first turn of the Yangtze at Shigu (石鼓) in Yunnan, where the river turns 180 degrees from southbound to northbound

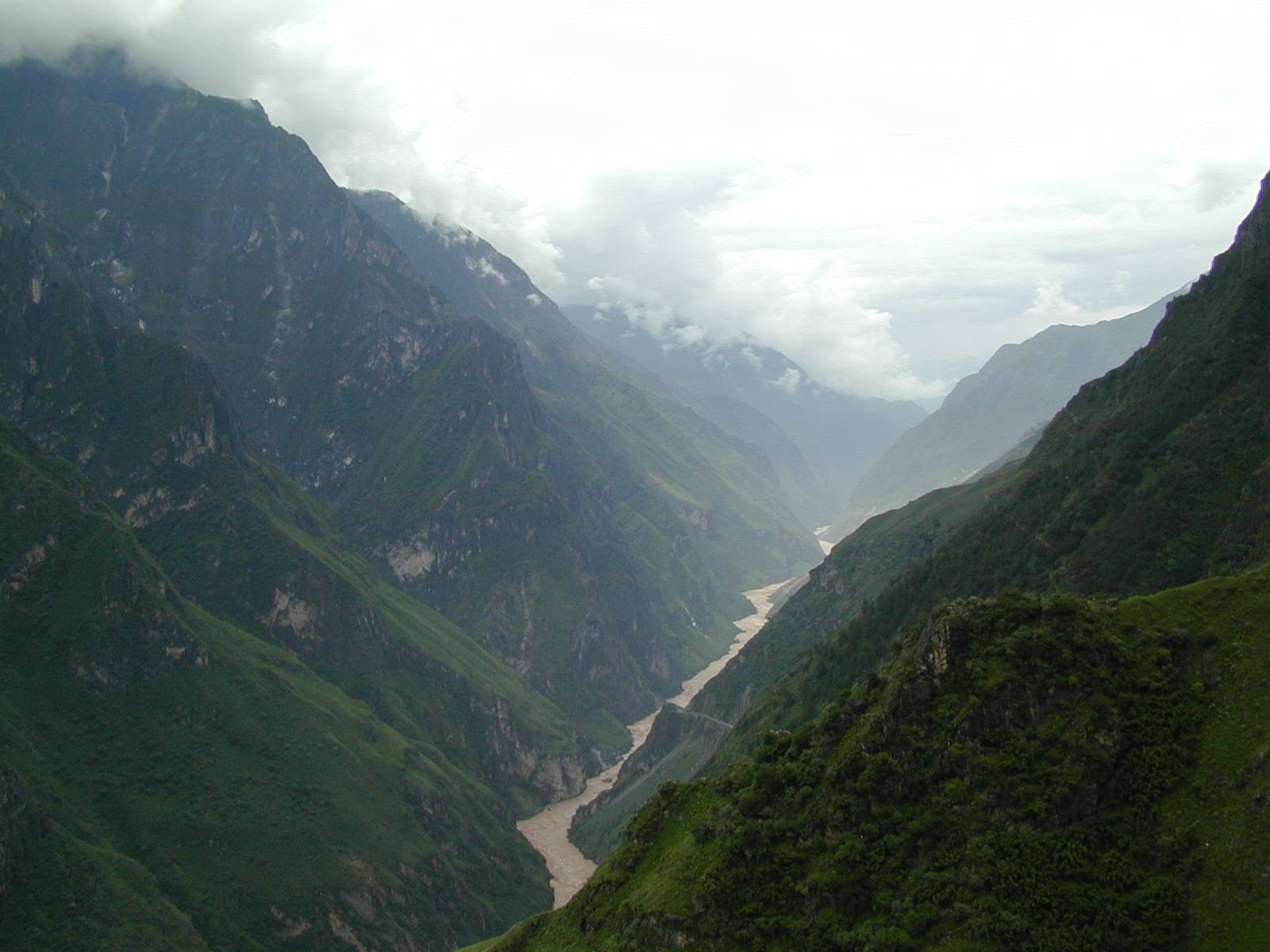
Tiger Leaping Gorge in Yunnan

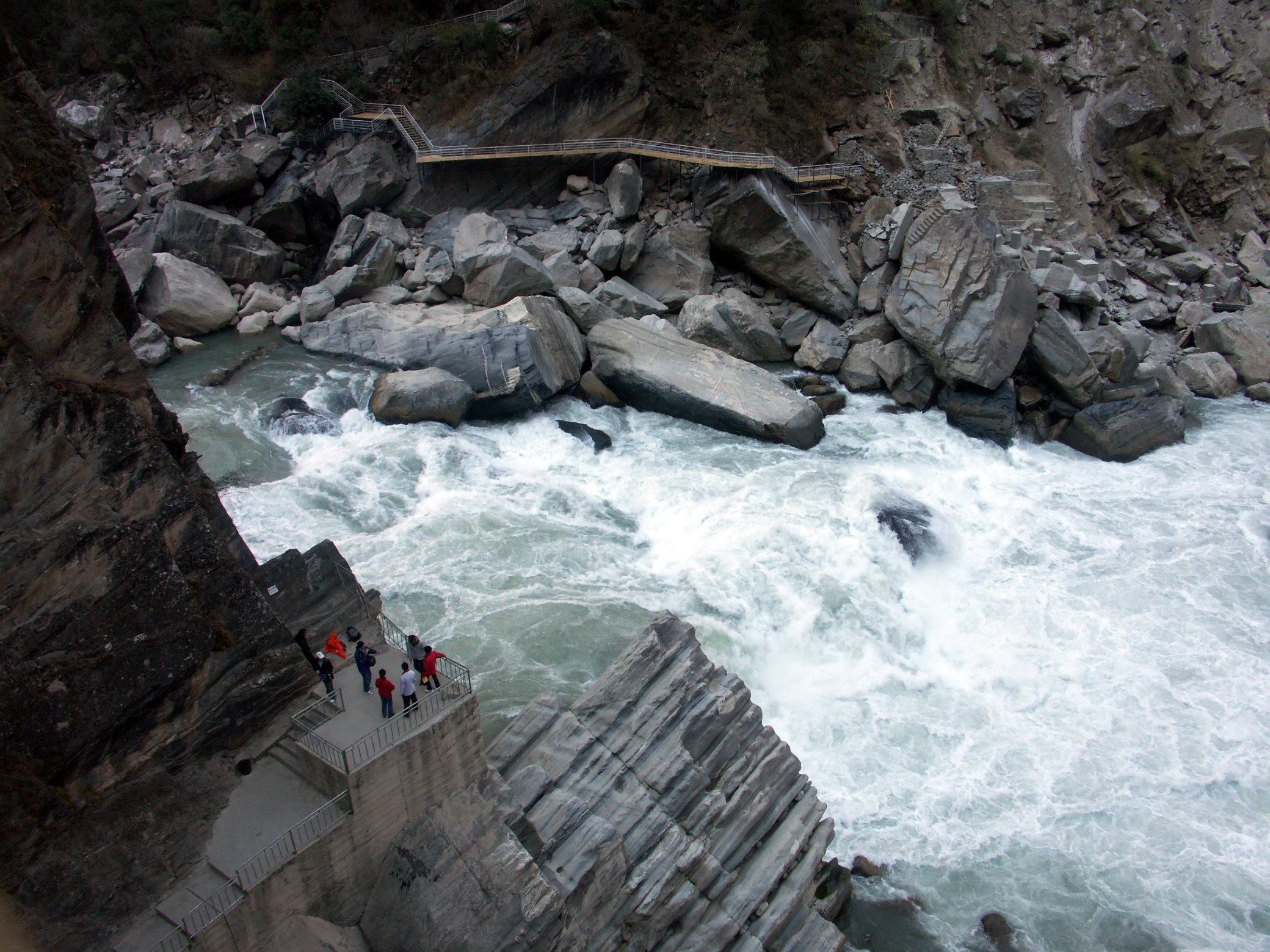
Narrowest point of the Tiger Leaping Gorge near Lijiang, downstream from Shigu

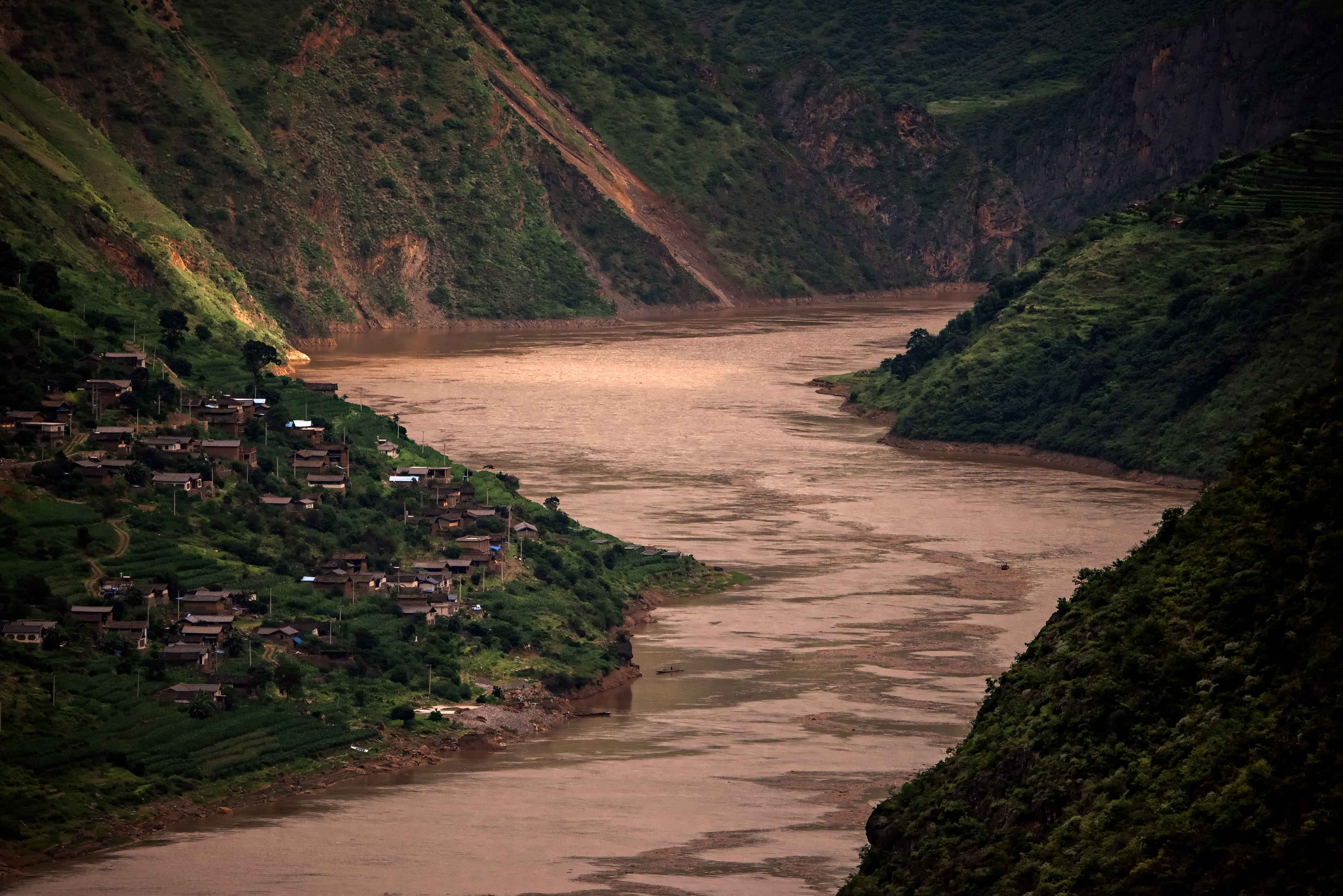
The Jinsha, "Golden Sands River", in Yunnan

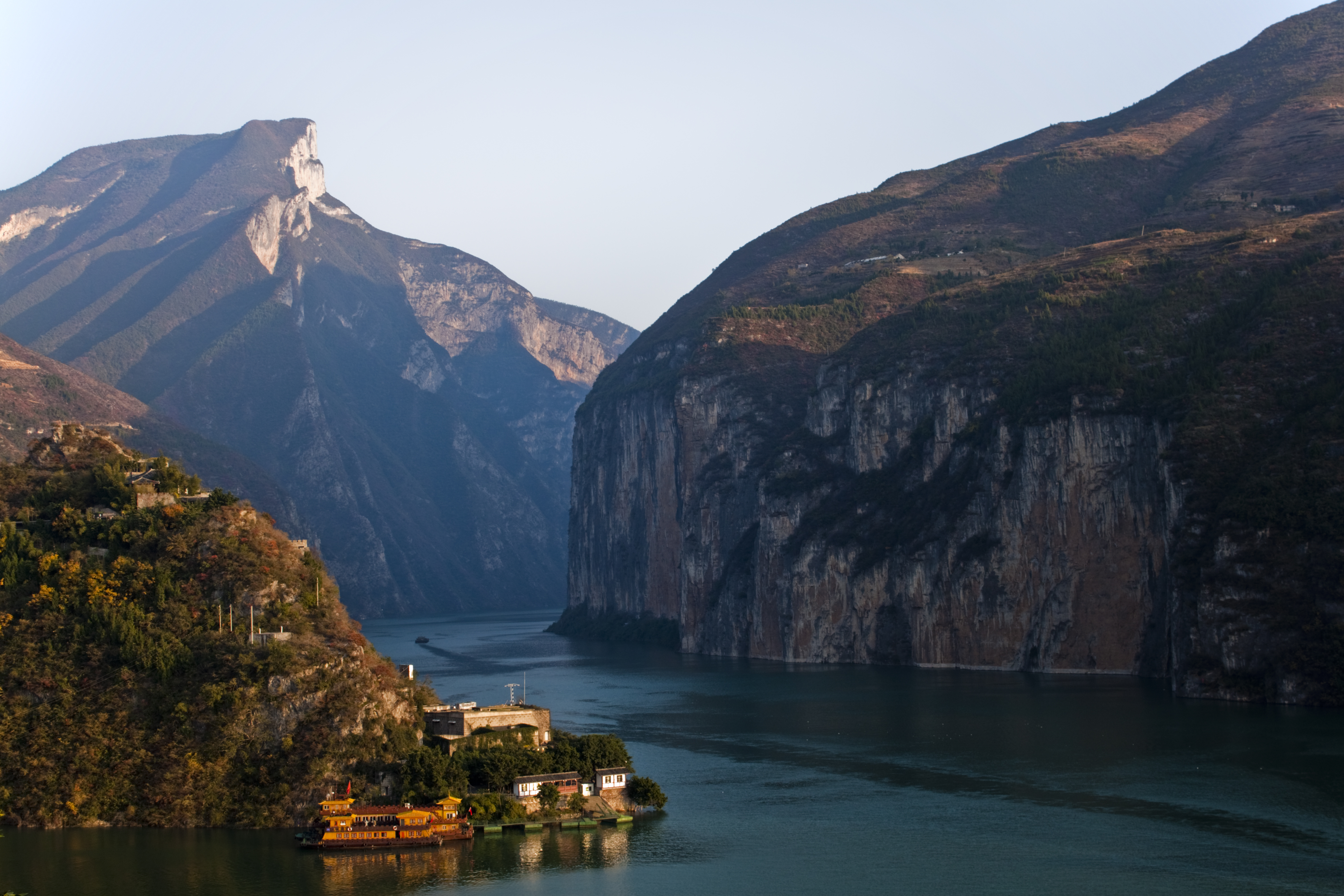
Qutang Gorge, one of the Three Gorges

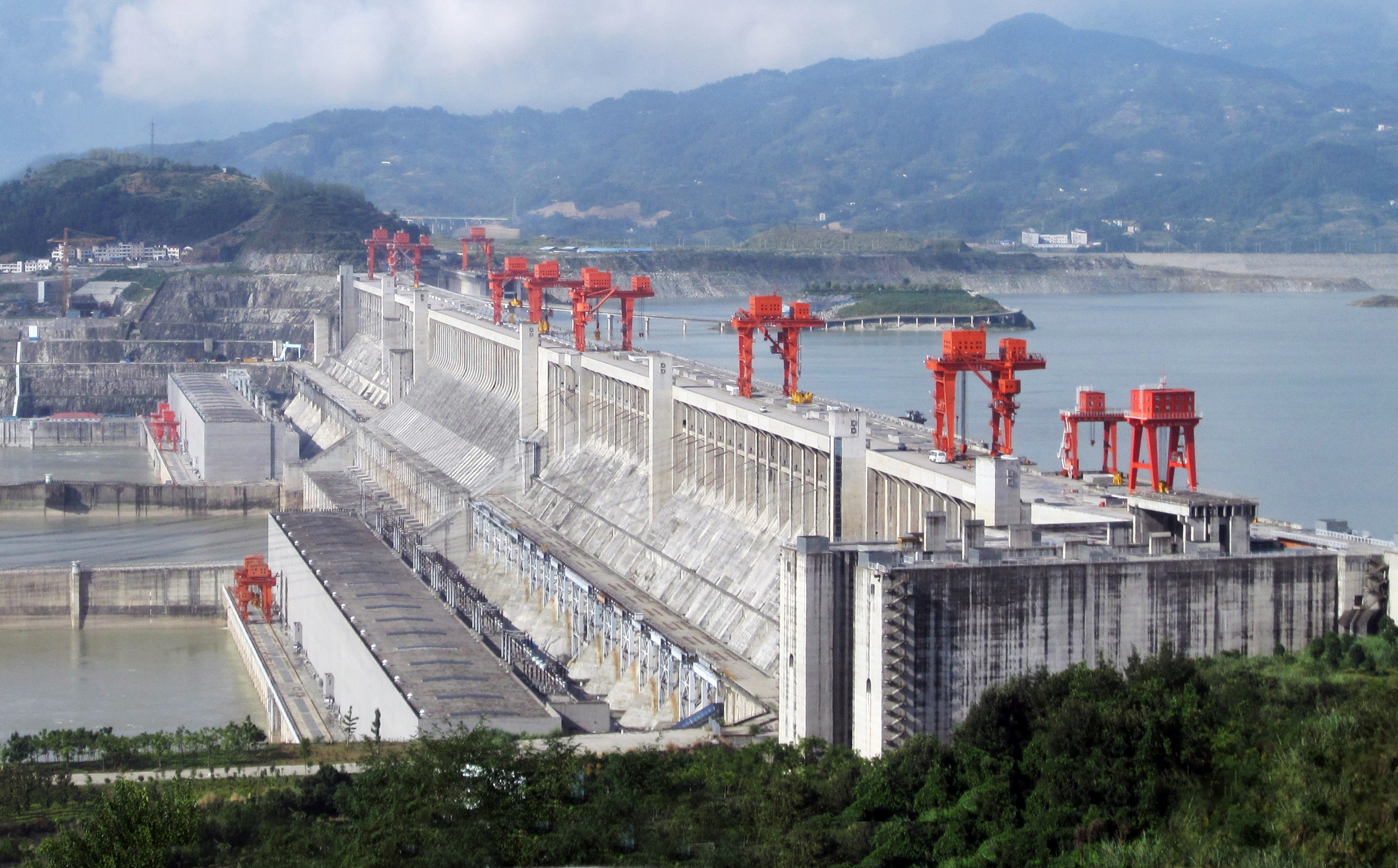
Three Gorges Dam in Hubei, the world's largest hydroelectric project

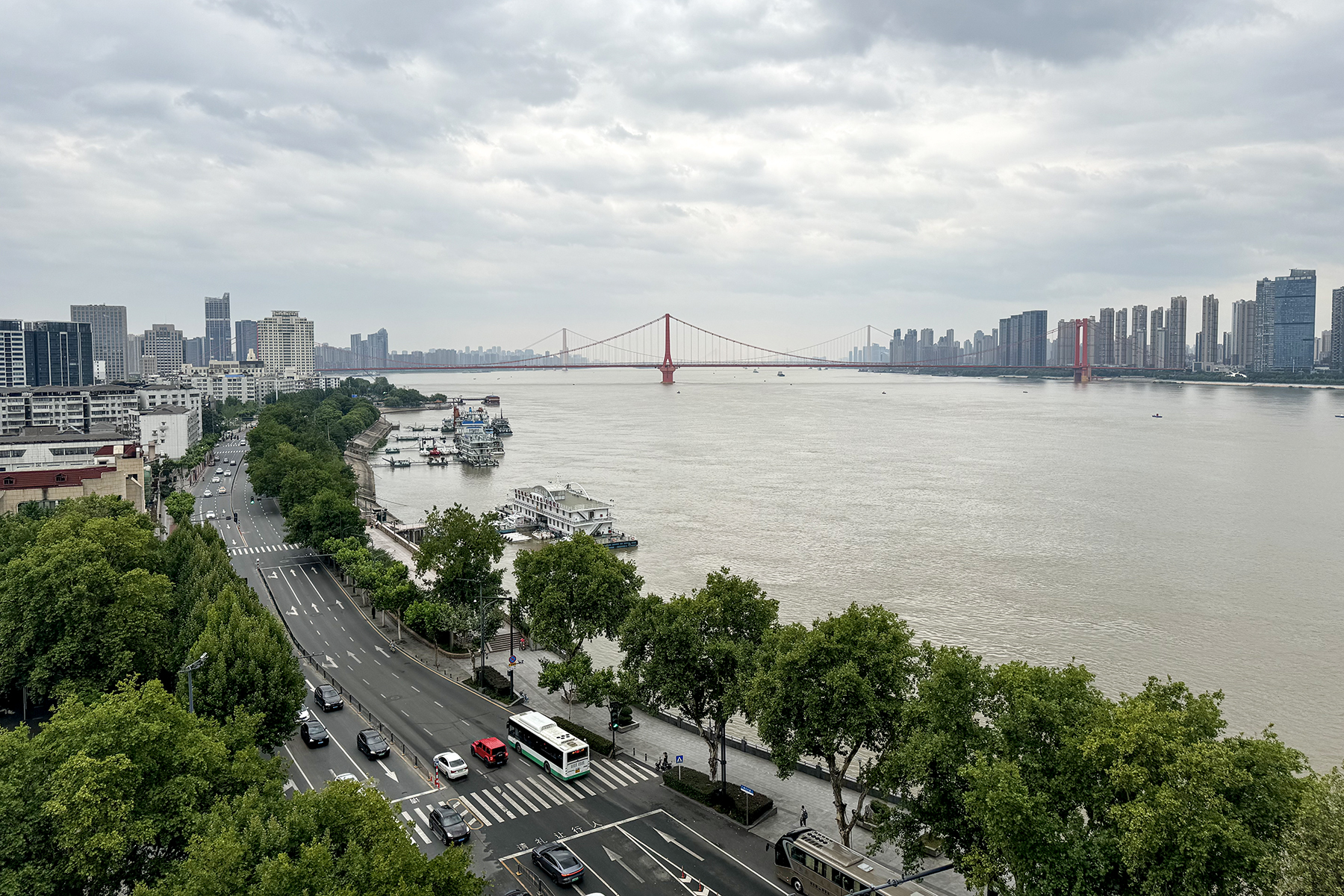
Yangtze in Wuchang

== See also ==
- Category: Tributaries of the Yangtze River
- List of direct tributaries of the Yangtze by size
- List of rivers in China
- List of most-polluted rivers
- Northern and Southern China, traditionally divided by the Huai River but sometimes considered to separate at the Yangtze
- Rediscovering the Yangtze River
- Ship lifts in China
- South-North Water Transfer Project
- Yangtze River Crossing
- Yangtze Service Medal
- Zhangjinggao Yangtze River Bridge
