= History of China (2002–2012) =

Hu era
- 2002–2012
History of China (1989–2002)	History of China (2012–present)
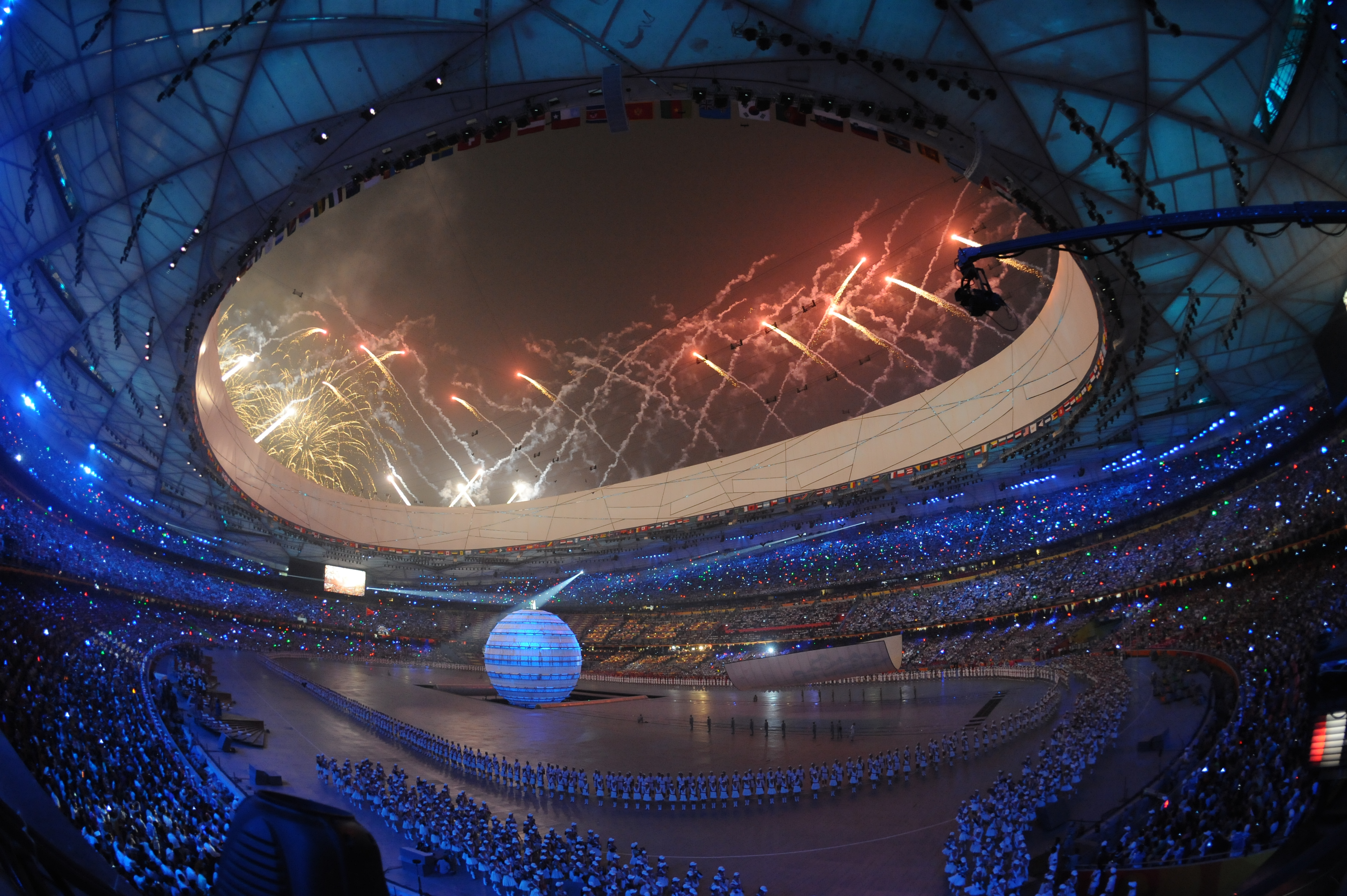
- 2008 Summer Olympics opening ceremony.
- Location: People's Republic of China
- Including: Hu–Wen Administration
- CCP General Secretary (Paramount leader): Hu Jintao
- President(s): Jiang Zemin; Hu Jintao
- Prime Minister(s): Zhu Rongji; Wen Jiabao
- Key events: Shenzhou 5; 2008 Summer Olympics

The People's Republic of China (PRC) became more influential economically in the 1990s and 2000s and was beginning to be widely recognized as an emerging superpower. In 2010, China became the world's second largest economy by nominal GDP. At the same time, numerous social problems emerged and intensified. As CCP General Secretary Jiang Zemin, Congress Chairman Li Peng and Chinese Premier Zhu Rongji, gradually retired from their position of power, "fourth-generation" leaders, led by CCP General Secretary Hu Jintao and Premier Wen Jiabao, faced with increasing social unrest, attempted to steer the country towards a new direction. From the path of focusing solely on economic development, Hu and Wen placed focus on creating an overall balance under the idea of the Scientific Outlook on Development to create a socialist harmonious society.

In this process, there was an unprecedented shift in stance towards favouring rural development and farmers, as well as other generally populist policies. The Hu-Wen government, on the same token, attempted to restrict some personal freedoms, especially those associated with political content on the Internet. China's increased prominence on the global stage has also brought with it general skepticism and intense scrutiny, especially in the lead up to the 2008 Summer Olympics and after the March 2008 protests in Tibet. The government continues to be criticized on human rights abuses and the various product quality scandals that have increasingly damaged the country's integrity and continues to raise suspicions about the country's safety standards. This has led to an intense wave of nationalism (or Socialist patriotism) surfacing in Chinese populations around the world.

As of mid-2012, government statistics show that for the first time ever over 50% of the Chinese population now live in urban areas, marking a milestone in the urbanization of China. The majority of modern city dwellers are migrants and their children who moved to cities during the economic boom of the last 30 years started by Deng Xiaoping's policy of reform and opening up.

== Politics ==
=== "Fourth Generation": The Hu-Wen administration ===
Ever since the 1980s, Deng Xiaoping had promoted mandatory retirement ages for senior CCP officials, which was made official in 1998. In November 2002, at the 16th Chinese Communist Party National Congress, then-CCP General Secretary Jiang Zemin stepped down from the powerful Politburo Standing Committee of the Chinese Communist Party to make way for a younger "fourth generation" of leadership led by Tsinghua engineering graduate Hu Jintao. Speculation remained, however, that Jiang would continue to wield significant influence. At the time, Jiang stacked newly expanded Politburo Standing Committee, China's foremost power organ, with three of his hardline allies: former Shanghai party secretary Huang Ju, former Beijing party secretary Jia Qinglin, and Li Changchun to control propaganda. In addition, the new vice-president, Zeng Qinghong, was also seen as a staunch Jiang ally, as he was part of Jiang's Shanghai clique.

Also elevated during the Congress was Wen Jiabao, then Premier Zhu Rongji's right-hand man. Wen would become Premier in March 2003, and along with Hu, they were termed the Hu-Wen Administration. Both Hu and Wen's careers are remarkable in that they survived through the 1989 political crisis, which was attributed to their moderate views and careful attention not to offend or alienate older supporters. Hu Jintao is the first General Secretary to have joined the Communist Party after the Revolution over 50 years ago. In his 50s, Hu was the youngest member by far of the then seven-member Standing Committee. Wen Jiabao, a geology engineer who spent most of career in China's hinterlands, had never lost his political ground despite being a former ally to disgraced CCP general secretary Zhao Ziyang.

In November 2012, Hu Jintao retired as General Secretary and was succeeded by Xi Jinping, the nation's first paramount leader to be born after the foundation of the PRC. Xi initiated a series of large-scale anti-corruption drives, which however are believed to be secondary to removing his political opponents in the party, especially allies of Jiang Zemin's two sons. Jiang himself, despite being retired since 2004, was believed to still be manipulating politics behind the scenes.

=== Policy transition ===
Due to the large number of social, political, and economic imbalances left over from the Jiang era, Hu and Wen inherited a government nearly run-down from severe corruption and the immense rise in materialism. Because Jiang continued to wield influence, the direction of the Hu-Wen administration did not deviate from that of the Jiang-era for a few years after taking over power. Jiang, however, faced both popular pressure and significant inner party and military opposition, and stepped down as the Central Military Commission Chairman in September 2004. Although superficially, Hu and Wen continued to support Jiang era policies and hail his Three Represents theory, gradual changes were put in place to revert some of the worst excesses of the Jiang era. The changes had a much more egalitarian focus, concentrated on sectors of the Chinese population which have been left behind by the economic reform and closing the great wealth gap. Hu and Wen have both taken a number of high-profile trips to the poorer areas of China with the stated goal of understanding these areas better.

The degree of difference between the Hu and Jiang administrations is subject to debate. Within the top leadership of the PRC, there was still a general consensus that the reform and opening up should continue. But because of the clear slant towards more capitalist elements under a one-party system, it has been contested that the government has an unclear ideological direction. The seriousness of China's internal problems is often masked by its high economic growth indicators and rapidly increasing foreign investment interest. Both Hu and Wen have given keynote addresses indicating the government's determination to deal with problems in a more logical, scientific way.

=== Media control ===
Chinese leaders understand that news media could be a very effective means to fight against corruption. Media controls were initially reduced, as market forces have encouraged tabloid reporting. Yet, the government occasionally fires reporters or shuts down newspapers that stray outside the party-line. The media reforms of Hu Jintao have been considered conservative by Western watchdogs. At the same time, Hu issued a directive for official CCP newspapers and state media outlets such as Xinwen Lianbo to concentrate on more populist issues instead of constantly following the daily affairs of each of China's top leaders.

The introduction of the Internet and SMS has increased the difficulty of attaining complete control, although general internet censorship involving sites such as Google and Wikipedia persist. Moreover, the news media from Hong Kong, protected by Basic Law, has become increasingly involved in news reporting in China, and have become increasingly accessible to a Mainland public hungry for "real news".

=== Protection of individual rights ===
The term "Weiquan movement" first appeared in the 1990s. The word wéiquán (Chinese characters: 維權) literally means "rights protection". As it implies, the Weiquan movement is not necessarily meant to protect specifically the political rights of the civilians. In fact, it was rather like a movement of consumers' rights protection at its early stage. It became more developed after 2003. Citizens began to protect their violated rights by means of organizing demonstrations, seeking help through the legal system and media reports, writing open or appeal letters, etc. However, because the legal system is not independent and mature, and the fact that the central government is sometimes suspicious and local governments even hostile toward it, the Weiquan movement has been encountering difficulties in the course of its development.

There are cases in which lawyers were harassed, journalists beaten, and civilians imprisoned in the Weiquan movement. What makes the Weiquan movement more difficult is the Chinese system "Re-education through labor" (Pinyin: láodòng jiàoyăng or láojiào in short) (Chinese characters: 劳动教养 or 劳教 in short), in which person can be detained for up to 4 years without being convicted by a court. This system is also used to deal with some activists of the Weiquan movement.

In spite of the difficulties, the Weiquan movement still made some progress, such as the abolition of "custody and repatriation" in 2003. However, the pace of the progress is still very slow.

=== Hong Kong ===
Hong Kong's sovereignty was transferred to the People's Republic of China in 1997. Since then, the economy of the former British colony has progressed smoothly. There was ongoing debate about the amount of democracy under the new system. Notably, the central government ran into trouble with Hong Kong legal groups and citizens surrounding the territory's pseudo-constitution, the Hong Kong Basic Law, particularly Article 23, and democratic reform. Although the region enjoys a high degree of autonomy in all areas except for defence and foreign affairs, the Central Government in Beijing desired to keep appointment powers for the Hong Kong Chief Executive as well as part of the Hong Kong legislature. These continued powers led to unrest with certain segments of the Hong Kong population, who demanded direct elections for the Chief Executive and the legislature. Thousands of protesters took to the streets in a series of July 1 marches.

=== Taiwan ===
With Hong Kong and Macau reunited with the mainland the main outstanding issue is Taiwan. The strategy of the PRC government was to wait out the term of pro-Taiwan independence President Chen Shui-bian in hopes that the pro-Chinese unification ticket of Lien Chan and James Soong would win the elections of 2004. Kuomintang Chairman Lien Chan made an unprecedented visit to Beijing in 2005, shaking hands with Communist Party leader Hu Jintao, marking the first such Kuomintang-Communist meeting since the end of the Chinese Civil War. Chen Shui-bian and his pro-independence Democratic Progressive Party was reelected in 2004, impeding possible unification progress. Though Chen will unlikely pledge to the One-China policy to begin negotiations, he has pledged the Four Noes and One Without, which quells any armed conflict in the near future. At the same time, Chen has gone step by step with actions provoking Beijing, trying to gradually create a separate Taiwan identity. In 2008, tourism slightly opened between Taiwan and the mainland.

=== Tibet ===
The Chinese government and the 14th Dalai Lama have been in contact since 1978, at the behest of the reformist Deng Xiaoping, and have held several secret or formal talks since 1982. The main points of contention are the Dalai Lama's want for a Greater Tibet, or to unite the Tibet Autonomous Region with Chinese territory that has not been a part of political Tibet in modern times, and the Dalai Lama's insistence that Tibet should be run "like a western-style democracy" instead of by the Chinese Communist Party. In response to the Chinese government's rejection of these demands, the Dalai Lama has traveled all over the world persuading foreign governments to demand China accept these terms. As a result of this pressure and the apparent failure of liberal reforms in Tibet to quell separatist sentiment, hardliners within the Chinese government gained in power. Tibetan nationalists felt, then, that they must escalate with violent opposition in Tibet "to prevent China from doing business as usual". After a period of relatively peaceful time since the demonstrations in 1989, the 2008 Tibetan unrest indeed provoked an international reaction against China.

== Issues ==
=== SARS, Neo-SARS and other disasters ===
In November 2002, the SARS outbreak began in Guangdong. To stop panic and avoid possible economic damage, and to preserve face and public confidence, local officials applied tight media control. The central Government was knowingly ignorant of the media control. The international community was misinformed about the existence of the virus. Finally in April 2003 the government admitted to the full scale of ‘atypical pneumonia’ cases infected with SARS, two months after the disease had rapidly spread across the world with initial infections in Hong Kong and Vietnam sourced to Guangdong. After intense international pressure, PRC officials allowed international officials to investigate the situation. In late April, major revelations came to light as the PRC government admitted to underreporting the number of cases due to the problems inherent in the health care system. A number of PRC officials were fired from their posts, including the health minister Zhang Wenkang and the mayor of Beijing Meng Xuenong (a Jiang and Hu supporter, respectively), and systems were set up to improve reporting and control in the SARS crisis. The PRC government delivered an official apology. General Secretary Hu Jintao promised a total disclosure of SARS data and permitted WHO experts to examine the SARS cases. Finally, in July 2003, the WHO declared SARS contained, but warned the disease could emerge again during the next winter. By then the disease had already made its way around the world.

Just as the nation was emerging out of the SARS crisis, A new dangerous epidemic suddenly appeared the avian flu outbreak. Beijing has maintained a strict and transparent policy to gain back a reputation damaged heavily during the SARS outbreak. In October 2005, Premier Wen Jiabao issued a nationwide directive to heavily prosecute the officials who attempted to hide Avian Flu cases. Chinese society was woken up by a series of disasters and accidents, especially SARS in 2003, followed by the explosion of avian flu and the chemical spill in the Songhua River in 2005. The last disaster finally led to a national risk management system equipped with a full range of emergency responses.

In December 2019, a new strain of coronavirus later identified SARS-CoV-2, broke out in Wuhan, Hubei then spread to other provinces of China and many other countries. Following this the Chinese government response has pursued a zero-COVID strategy and strict lockdowns, leading to protests against the COVID measures in November 2022.

=== Anti-corruption efforts ===
Chinese society depended heavily on personal relationships, which, combined with the new lust for wealth, produced escalating corruption. Historian Keith Schoppa says that bribery was only one of the tools of corruption, which also included, "embezzlement, nepotism, smuggling, extortion, cronyism, kickbacks, deception, fraud, squandering public monies, illegal business transactions, stock manipulation and real estate fraud." Given the repeated anti-corruption campaigns it was a prudent precaution to move as much of the fraudulent money as possible overseas.

Top leaders such as General Secretary Jiang Zemin warned that corruption could threaten the party's ongoing existence. Corruption has been a major area of focus in the Hu-Wen Administration, although the effectiveness of anti-corruption measures has been disputed. Although it has been argued that corruption is the inevitable result of China's social customs and the complicated nature of social relationships (see guanxi) in the country, it is reasonable to believe that one-party rule and the current political system is, at least in part, exacerbating the problem. In 2008 the head of the university center on corruption estimated that 10,000 corrupt officials fled China with up to $100 billion in public funds in the last decade.

PLA General Xu Caihou provided a classic case of high-level corruption. He served as a high military official and once sat on the Politburo. He died of cancer in 2015 as investigations into his embezzlements and bribes began. His home contained enormous amounts of gold, jewelry, cash, and other luxury items requiring several trucks to haul away. He kept a long list of clients who had received undeserved military promotions through bribery and payoffs.

Opinion polls continually show that corruption (in all sectors of society) is the main complaint of the people. Currently, hospitals, schools, police, and social and legal institutions are constantly affected by bribery, cronyism, and nepotism. However, the Chinese Communist Party still asserts a monopoly on exposing corrupt officials and businessmen, and critics accuse the party of selective punishment. Analysts say the authorities are reluctant to pursue senior figures and their allies and punishment comes in the form of political purges rather than genuine law enforcement.

== Foreign policy ==
Hu Jintao's serious public image led China to a more staunch stance on global affairs compared to the Jiang era. Partly attributed to the United States' attention being focused towards problem regions such as Iraq, China has made advances in foreign affairs without much restriction from the U.S. in the 21st century.

Military modernization and increased defense spending, as well as industrial and military espionage and accusations of cyber-hacking, have caused increased concern over Chinese intentions since 2000. However, the PLA's modernization efforts have continued to be hamstrung by corruption, outdated military equipment, and continued emphasis on political indoctrination over practical military skills.

=== African nations ===
China has also taken an increasingly prominent role in Africa. Hu Jintao went on a 7-nation African visit in January 2007, solidifying deals and promising financial aid with African leaders with no conditions attached, winning the support, albeit with some caution, of many African leaders.

=== Shanghai Cooperation Organisation ===
In 1996 the Shanghai Five grouping was created, comprising China, Kazakhstan, Kyrgyzstan, Russia, and Tajikistan. When Uzbekistan joined the group in 2001 it was renamed to the Shanghai Cooperation Organisation (SCO). The SCO states its goals are "the strengthening mutual confidence and good-neighbourly relations among the member countries; promoting their effective cooperation in politics, trade and economy, science and technology, culture as well as education, energy, transportation, tourism, environmental protection and other fields; making joint efforts to maintain and ensure peace, security and stability in the region, to move towards the establishment of a new, democratic, just and rational political and economic international order."

Western analysts note that the SCO may serve as a balance against US and NATO advancement in the region. Some have even called it a new Warsaw Pact. SCO leaders, however, insist that the organization is not an alliance directed against any other states.

== Remaining challenges ==
=== Population ===
The leaders of the PRC faced a daunting task of pushing ahead with major economic reforms while managing its vast population of 1.3 billion people. The economic reforms had undermined the socialist state's safety net and forced people to look to the private sector for work and services. As the economy faced structural changes, 25 to 30 million state workers had been laid off since 1998 while only 8 million jobs are created annually at the current growth rate. With millions of laid off workers roaming the cities, keeping social order proved to be a difficult task. Workers' protests had not been too infrequent, with the government usually heeding to the protestors' demands, while arresting their leaders.

Another potential crisis was the advent of AIDS, which by UN estimates, could reach 10 million cases in 2010. In the Henan province, where perhaps hundreds of thousands of people have been infected with HIV by selling their blood, the government was only beginning to pay attention to the problem during that period. Public awareness and widespread acknowledgement has yet to come.

=== Pollution ===
China's reliance on coal continue to damage its already compromised air quality. Some of its major cities are among the most polluted in the world.

== See also ==
- General secretaryship of Xi Jinping
- Second Cold War
- China threat theory
- Chinese Century
