= List of major power stations in Jilin province =

This article lists the major power stations located in Jilin province.

== Non-renewable ==
=== Coal-based ===
Station	Name in Chinese	Coordinates	Capacity (MW)	Operational units	Under construction units
Shuangliao Power Station	双辽电厂	43°31′41″N 123°27′55″E	1,800	4×300 MW, 1×600 MW	
Changchun No2 Power Station	长春第二热电厂	43°53′01″N 125°23′37″E	1,500	4×200 MW, 2×350 MW	
Jilin Thermal Power Station	吉林热电厂	43°54′30″N 126°30′13″E	1,400	4×350 MW	
Jiutai Power Station	九台电厂	44°06′24″N 125°55′38″E	1,320	2×660 MW	
Da'an Power STation	京能大安电厂		1,320		2×660 MW
Hunjiang Power Station	浑江电厂	41°57′54″N 126°27′06″E	1,000	2×200 MW, 2×300 MW	
Baicheng Power Station	白城电厂	45°31′33″N 122°46′32″E	1,320	2×660 MW	
Siping Power Station	四平电厂	43°09′15″N 124°24′03″E	900	2×100 MW, 2×350 MW	
Liaoyuan Power Station	辽源电厂	42°52′21″N 125°09′41″E	860	2×100 MW, 2×330 MW	
Huichun Power Station	珲春电厂	42°53′44″N 130°17′23″E	860	2×100 MW, 2×330 MW	
Changchun No3 Power Station	长春第三热电厂	43°46′41″N 125°08′35″E	700	2×350 MW	
Changchun Power Station	长春热电厂	44°02′23″N 125°13′17″E	700	2×350 MW	
Jiangnan Thermal Power Station	江南热电厂	43°47′37″N 126°35′25″E	660	2×330 MW	
Erdaojiang Power Station	二道江电厂	41°46′52″N 126°00′58″E	600	2×200 MW, 2×100 MW	

== Renewable ==
=== Hydroelectric ===
==== conventional ====
Station	Name in Chinese	Coordinates	River	Capacity (MW)	Dam height (meters)	Status	Operational units	Under construction units	Reference
Baishan Hydropower Station	白山水电站	42°43′35″N 127°13′25″E	Songhua	1,800	149.5	Operational	5×300 MW, 2×150 MW (PS)		
Fengman Hydropower Station	丰满水电站	43°43′12″N 126°41′18″E	Songhua	1,004	90.5	Operational	1×60 MW, 2×65 MW, 5×83 MW, 2×85 MW,1×1.15 MW		
Hongshi Hydropower Station	红石水电站	42°56′58″N 127°07′49″E	Songhua	200	46	Operational	4×50 MW		

==== Pumped-storage ====
Station	Name in Chinese	Coordinates	Capacity (MW)	Rated head (meters)	Status	Operational units	Under construction units
Dunhua Pumped-storage Hydro Power Station	敦化抽水蓄能电站	43°53′25″N 128°34′04″E	1,400	655	Operational	4×350 MW	
Jiahe Pumped-storage Hydro Power Station	蛟河抽水蓄能电站	43°26′48″N 127°33′29″E	1,200	392	Under construction		4×300 MW
Baishan Pumped-storage Hydro Power Station	白山抽水蓄能电站	42°43′35″N 127°13′25″E	300	105.8	Operational	2×150 MW	

== See also ==
- List of power stations in China
