= Songhua River =

River in northeastern China

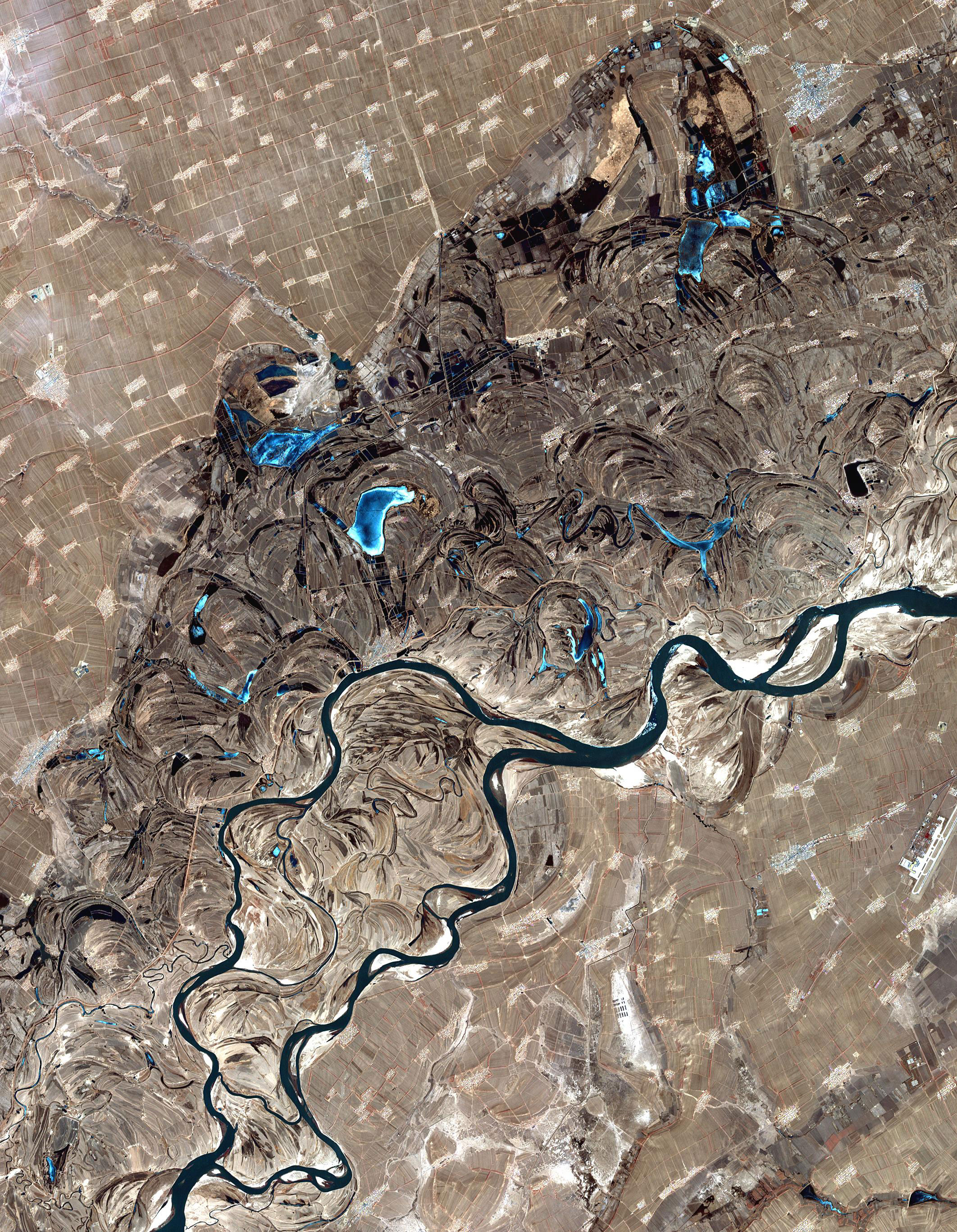
- Songhua River, just west of Harbin. Oxbow lakes are common sights along the sides of the river.
- Native name: ᠰᡠᠩᡤᠠᡵᡳ ᡠᠯᠠ (Manchu); sunggari ula (Manchu)

Location
- Country: People's Republic of China
- Provinces: Jilin, Heilongjiang

Physical characteristics
- Source: Changbai Mountains
  - location: Antu County, Jilin
  - coordinates: 42°02′06″N 128°16′37″E
  - elevation: 1,412 m (4,633 ft)
- Mouth: Amur
  - location: Tongjiang, Heilongjiang
  - coordinates: 47°41′56″N 132°31′03″E
  - elevation: 44 m (144 ft)
- Length: 1,897 km (1,179 mi)
- Basin size: 557,180 km^{2} (215,130 sq mi)
- Discharge
  - location: Tongjiang, China (near mouth)
  - average: 76.2 km^{3}/a (2,410 m^{3}/s) to 81.77 km^{3}/a (2,591 m^{3}/s).

Basin features
- Progression: Amur→ Sea of Okhotsk
- River system: Amur
- Tributaries
  - left: Nen, Hulan, Tangwang
  - right: Mudanjiang

Songhua River
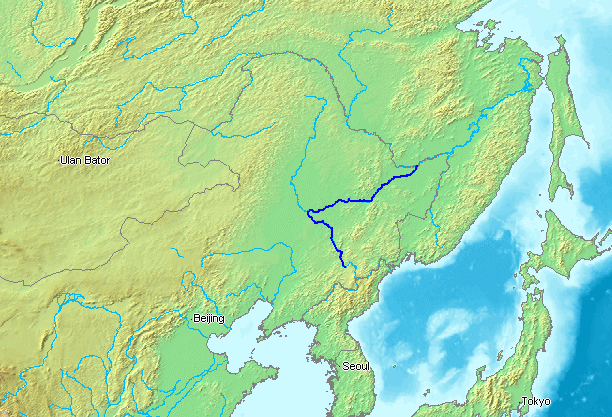
- Songhua River is shown in a darkish blue color.

Chinese name
- Chinese: 松花江
Transcriptions
Standard Mandarin
- Hanyu Pinyin: Sōnghuā Jiāng

Alternative Chinese name
- Chinese: 海西
Transcriptions
Standard Mandarin
- Hanyu Pinyin: Hǎixī

Manchu name
- Manchu script: ᠰᡠᠩᡤᠠᡵᡳ ᡠᠯᠠ
- Romanization: sunggari ula

The Songhua or Sunghwa River (also Haixi or Xingal, Russian: Сунгари, romanized: Sungari) is one of the primary rivers of China, and the longest tributary of the Amur. It flows about 1,897 km (1,179 mi) from Changbai Mountains on the China–North Korea border through China's northeastern Jilin and Heilongjiang provinces.

The river drains 557,180 km^{2} (215,130 mi^{2}) of land, and has an annual discharge of 76.2 km^{3}/a (2,410 m^{3}/s) to 81.77 km^{3}/a (2,591 m^{3}/s).

The extreme flatness of the Northeast China Plain has caused the river to meander over time, filling the wide plain with oxbow lakes, as remnants of the previous paths of the river.

== Geography ==
The Songhua rises south of Heaven Lake, near the China-North Korea border.

From there it flows north, to be interrupted by the Baishan, Hongshi and Fengman hydroelectric dams. The Fengman Dam forms a lake that stretches for 62 kilometers (39 mi). Below the dam, the Second Songhua flows north through Jilin, then northwest until it is joined by its largest tributary, the Nen River, near Da'an, to create the Songhua proper.

The Songhua turns east through Harbin, and after the city, it is joined from the south by the Ashi River, and then by the Hulan River from the north.

A new dam was constructed in 2007 near Bayan (50 km northeast of Harbin), creating the Dadingshan Reservoir, which is named after the scenic area on the south bank (Chinese: 大頂山; pinyin: dàdǐngshān; lit. 'Big Topped Mountain').

The river flows onward through Jiamusi and south of the Lesser Xing'an Range, to eventually join the Amur at Tongjiang, Heilongjiang.

The river freezes from late November until March. It has its highest flows when the mountain snow melts during the spring thaw. The river is navigable up to Harbin by medium-sized ships. Smaller craft can navigate the Songhua up to Jilin and the Nen River up to Qiqihar.

Cities along the river include:

- Jilin
- Harbin
- Jiamusi

== History ==
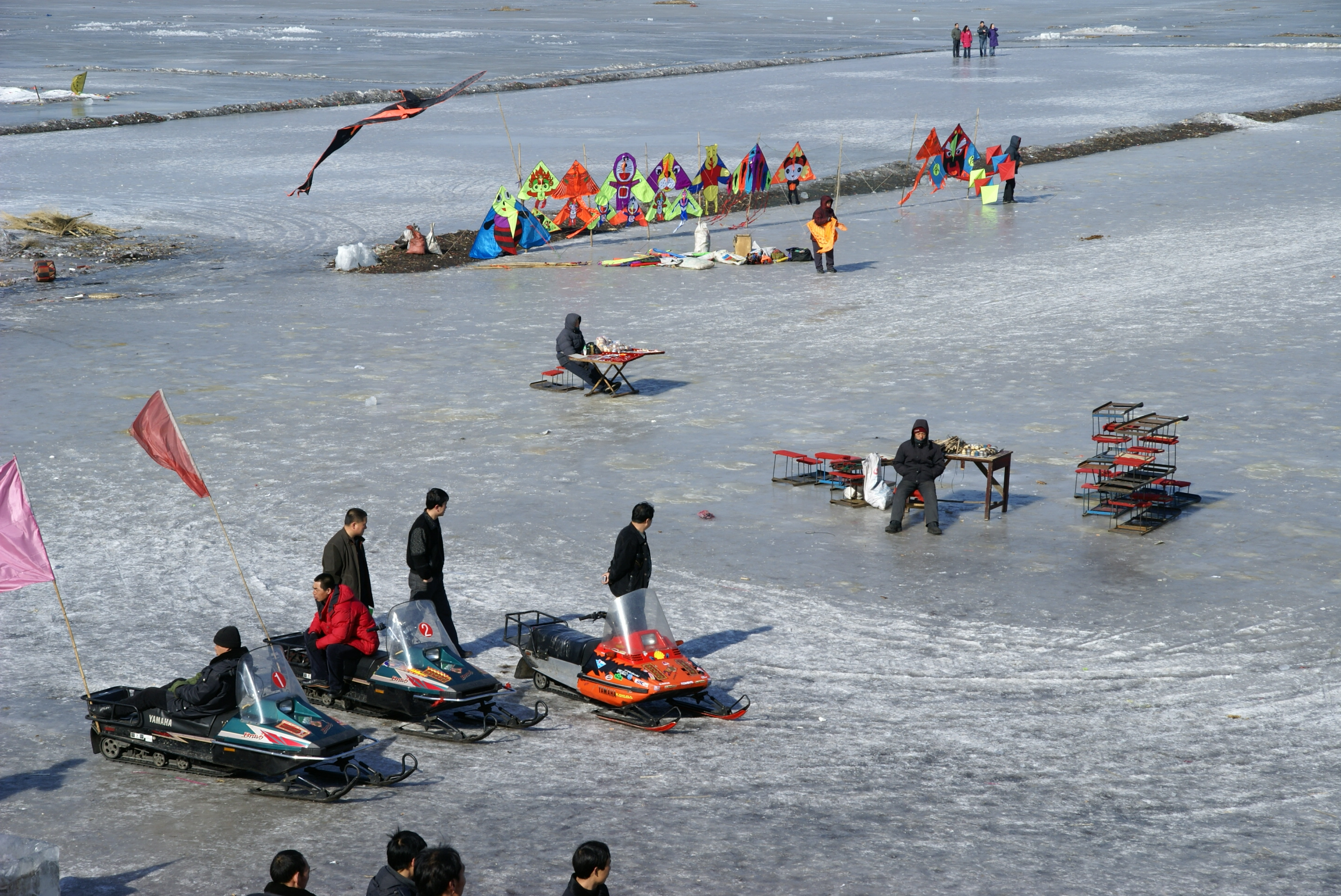
Vendors on frozen Songhua

In November 2005, the river was contaminated with benzene, leading to a shutdown of Harbin's water supply. The spill stretched 80 kilometers (50 mi) and eventually reached the Amur (Heilong) River on the China–Russia border. On July 28, 2010, several thousand barrels from two chemical plants in China's Jilin City were washed away by floods. Some of them contained 170 kilograms (370 lb) of explosive material like trimethylsilyl chloride and hexamethyldisiloxane. In 2016, the part near the city of Jilin was affected by a minor flood.

== See also ==
- Geography of China
- Mudanjiang River
- "Along the Songhua River", a Chinese patriotic song
