= Huifa River =

River in China

Coordinates: 43°07′27″N 126°57′33″E

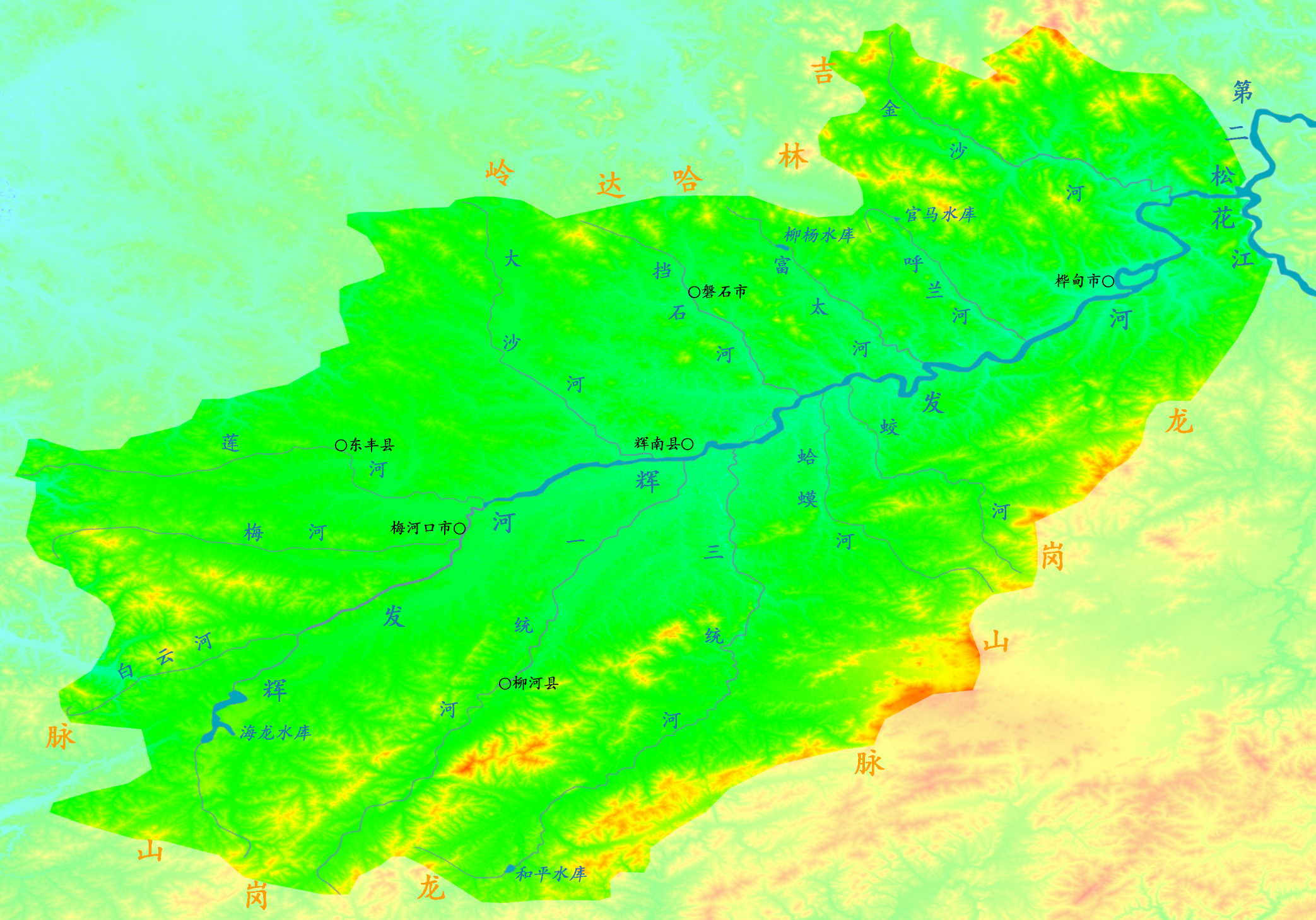
Map of the Huifa River.

The Huifa River (Chinese: 辉发河; pinyin: Huīfā Hé) is a 267.7-km-long tributary of the Second Songhua River in center Northeast China. The source of river is located in Qingyuan Manchu Autonomous County of Liaoning Province and flows generally from west to east across Meihekou、Huinan、Huadian of Jilin Province and joins Second Songhua River at Toudaogou of Huadian City.

== History ==
Large numbers of dolmens are distributed along the Huifa River's upper reaches. They date to the fifth century BCE and are related to similar megalithic tombs located on the Korean Peninsula and in the Liao River basin and
