= Second Songhua River =

Coordinates: 45°21′28″N 124°42′08″E

Location
- Country: China

Physical characteristics
- Mouth
  - location: Songhua River near Huzhou, Anji County of Zhejiang Province, China
- Length: 849 km (528 mi)
- Basin size: 73,000 km^{2} (28,000 sq mi)

The Second Songhua River is a tributary of the Songhua River in Jilin Province, China.

The river meets the Songhua and Nen Rivers near Songyuan and is fed by several tributaries, including the First Dao, Second Dao, Huifa, Yinma, Yitong and Lafa Rivers. Its flow is interrupted by the Baishan, Hongshi and Fengman Dams.
