= Gongji =

Gongji may refer to:

- Duan Zhixing (died 1200?) or Emperor Gongji of Dali
- Gongji, Anhui, town in Taihe County, Anhui, China
- Gongji Township in Huadian, Jilin, China
- Gongji Subdistrict, in Wafangdian, Liaoning, China
