= Dolmens on the Upper Reaches of the Huifa River =

- Location within China
- 42.279388°N 125.903925°E
- Type: Tombs
- Periods: Mid to Late Pottery Period
- Cultures: Northern-style East Asian megaliths, Yemaek, Seodansan
- Location: Jilin Province
- Region: Liuhe County

Site notes
- Architectural style: Megalithic tombs

Dolmens on the Upper Reaches of the Huifa River
- Traditional Chinese: 輝發河上游石棚墓
- Simplified Chinese: 辉发河上游石棚墓
Transcriptions
Standard Mandarin
- Hanyu Pinyin: Huīfāhé shàngyóu shípéng mù

The Dolmens on the Upper Reaches of the Huifa River are a collection of more than 80 megalithic tombs found along two tributaries of the Huifa River.

== Overview ==
The dolmens are located in the administrative divisions of Liuhe County and Meihekou City in Tonghua, Jilin. They are distributed throughout the drainage basins of the Yitong (Chinese: 一統河; pinyin: yītǒng hé) and Santong (Chinese: 三統河; pinyin: sāntǒng hé) rivers, both tributaries of the Huifa River. Most were built on low-lying mountain ridges.

More than 80 dolmens have been recorded. The majority were made using a worked granite slab for the floor, three to four rectangular or square slabs as walls, and a large slab that was placed on the top to act as an overhanging roof. Most slabs measure over 1 metre, but the largest is approximately 2 metres. The deceased was sometimes interred inside the dolmen or in a pit below the monument. In the latter cases, the walls of the grave were either made from stone or tamped earth.

Excavations of the burials have discovered human remains, stone arrowheads, and reddish-brown coarse pottery.

== Dates ==
Based on a presumed relationship between the dolmens and other archaeological sites, Hong Feng suggested that they mainly date to the ninth century BCE, with some potentially being built into the fifth century BCE. Yu Xiaohui, however, has argued that the dolmens represent the northernmost point where Northern-style East Asian megaliths are found. As a result, they are probably later than similar structures on the Liaoning Peninsula and may date later to around the fifth century BCE.

== Protection ==
The dolmens were listed as a Major Historical and Cultural Site Protected at the National Level in 2006.
