= Yinma River =

River in Jilin, China

Coordinates: 44°53′00″N 125°45′37″E

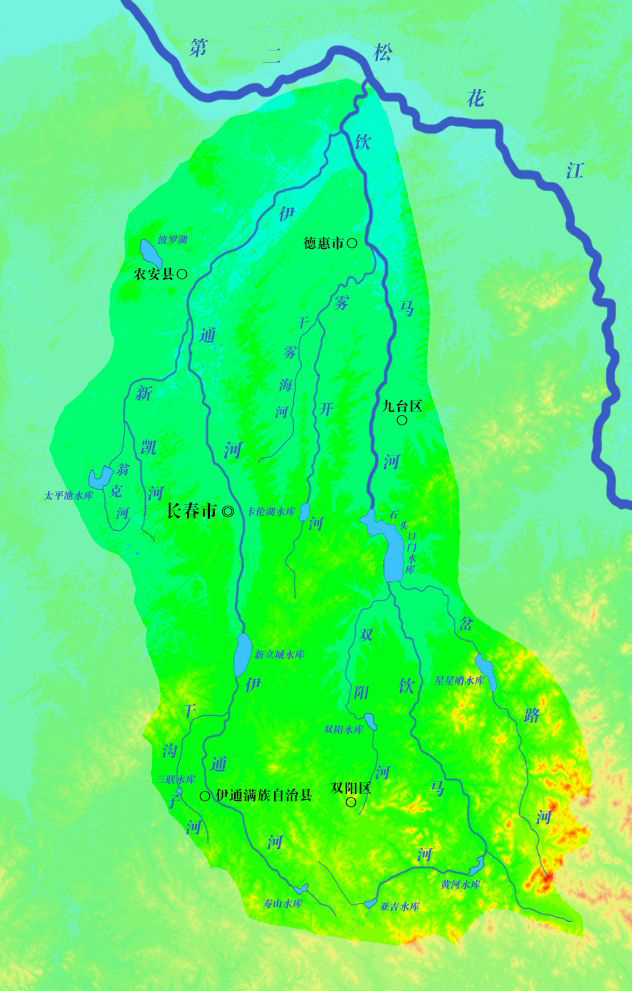
Map of the Yinma River.

The Yinma River (Chinese: 饮马河; pinyin: Yǐnmǎ Hé) is a 386.8-km-long tributary of the Second Songhua River in the center of Jilin province of China. The source of the river is located in Yitong Manchu Autonomous County and flows generally from south to north through Panshi、Jiutai、Dehui to join the Second Songhua River at Kaoshan in Nong'an County.
