= Hongshi Dam =

- Location within China
- Country: China
- Location: Huadian
- Coordinates: 42°56′59″N 127°07′55″E
- Status: Operational
- Construction began: 1982
- Opening date: 1985

Dam and spillways
- Type of dam: Gravity
- Impounds: Second Songhua River
- Height: 46 m (151 ft)
- Length: 438 m (1,437 ft)
- Elevation at crest: 298 m (978 ft)

Reservoir
- Total capacity: 1,630,000,000 m^{3} (1,321,463 acre⋅ft)
- Normal elevation: 290 m (951 ft)

Power Station
- Commission date: 1985-1987
- Turbines: 4 x 50 MW Kaplan-type
- Installed capacity: 200 MW

The Hongshi Dam is a gravity dam on the Second Songhua River located 30 km (19 mi) east of Huadian in Jilin Province, China. The primary purpose of the dam is hydroelectric power generation and its power plant has an installed capacity of 200 MW. Construction on the dam began in 1982 and the reservoir began to fill in November 1985. The first generator was operational in December 1985 and the last in October 1987. The 46 m (151 ft) tall dam creates a reservoir with a normal storage capacity of 1,630,000,000 m^{3} (1,321,463 acre⋅ft). The dam is named after the town of Hongshi, located 3 km (2 mi) downstream. The Baishan Dam is located upstream and the Fengman Dam downstream.

== See also ==
- List of dams and reservoirs in China
