= History of China (1989–2002) =

Jiang era
- 1989–2002
History of China (1976–1989)	History of China (2002–2012)
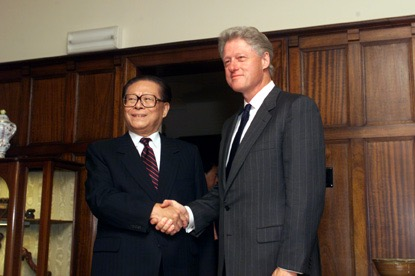
- Bill Clinton greets Jiang Zemin in Auckland New Zealand.
- Location: People's Republic of China
- Including: Third generation of the CCP
- General Secretary of the CCP (Paramount leader): Jiang Zemin
- President(s): Yang Shangkun; Jiang Zemin
- Prime Minister(s): Li Peng; Zhu Rongji
- Key events: Dissolution of the Soviet Union; Deng Xiaoping's southern tour Third Taiwan Strait Crisis; Persecution of Falun Gong; Joining the WTO

In the People's Republic of China, Deng Xiaoping formally retired after the 1989 Tiananmen Square protests and massacre, to be succeeded by CCP secretary Jiang Zemin. During that period, the crackdown on the protests in 1989 led to great woes in China's reputation globally, and sanctions resulted. The situation, however, would eventually stabilize. Deng's idea of checks and balances in the political system also saw its demise with Jiang consolidating power in the party, state and military. The 1990s was also affected by the collapse of the Soviet Union, but saw healthy economic development, but the closing of state-owned enterprises and increasing levels of corruption and unemployment, along with environmental challenges continued to plague China, as the country saw the rise to consumerism, crime, and new-age spiritual-religious movements such as Falun Gong. The 1990s also saw the peaceful handover of Hong Kong and Macau to Chinese control under the formula of One Country, Two Systems. China also saw a new surge of nationalism when facing crises abroad.

== Recovery in the 1990s ==
=== Restoring economic stability and growth ===
The inflation trends of the years leading up to the 1989 Tiananmen Square protests and massacre had subsided by the early 1990s, as Jiang Zemin and the new generation of leadership attempted to calm any economic influx. Political institutions have stabilized, owing to the institutionalized procedures of the Deng years and a generational shift from peasant revolutionaries to well-educated, professional technocrats. The majority of university graduates come from a sciences-oriented background, and many pursue life outside of China. For those who stayed, state-owned research firms and enterprises were a popular destination.

In the aftermath of the Tiananmen Square protests, China became an international pariah and the next three years were grim. Hardliners took over the government and began reining in free enterprise. They also attempted to revive Maoist propaganda and ideological campaigns, but the public largely treated it with apathy. In practice, the changes of the last decade made it impossible to ever truly return to the ways of Mao's time. The Chinese Communist Party (CCP) leadership was further embarrassed by the collapse of communism in Eastern Europe during 1989–1990, and especially by the fall of Romanian leader Nicolae Ceaușescu, as his fanatical regime was one they were certain would never fall. Despite retreating into its shell, China's government continued to state that it welcomed foreign business and investment. For all its weakness and unpopularity, the CCP nonetheless had no serious opposition, as most overseas dissident groups were divided, quarrelsome, and lacking a charismatic leader. In April 1990, Chinese Premier Li Peng visited Moscow where he was faced with dozens of Soviet protesters denouncing him as a butcher. Li laid a wreath on Lenin's tomb, indicating his loyalty to communism. His ideas of reform did not extend beyond economic matters, and he flatly dismissed the idea that glasnost and perestroika were also applicable to China. The failure of the August 1991 coup in Moscow also upset Chinese leaders, although the PRC publicly stated that all events going on in Eastern Europe and the Soviet Union were the internal affairs of those countries and it was not their business to criticize them. China also quickly granted diplomatic recognition to all newly independent ex-Soviet republics. Internal CCP discussions and documents however stated that the Soviets had made a colossal blunder by appointing Mikhail Gorbachev as CPSU general secretary and thus allowing the return of capitalism to the country. Further, the Chinese leadership maintained that the coup attempt fell apart due to an inability to keep the Soviet army in line with Marxist leninist ideas. As a result, political education and Marxist–Leninist propaganda in the PLA was stepped up.

Meanwhile, relations with the United States became extremely bad in the aftermath of Tiananmen Square, reaching their worst point since before President Richard Nixon's visit to China in 1972. The US Congress in particular was eager to impose as many economic sanctions and cancellation of business, trade, and cultural exchanges as it could, although President George HW Bush (who had been liaison officer to China in the 1970s), continued to uphold an optimistic view of Sino-US relations and that the current situation was only a temporary bump in the road. He did however succeed in antagonizing Beijing by meeting with the exiled Dalai Lama in April 1991. Chinese suspicion of US intentions worsened and numerous accusations were made of Washington having embarked on a systematic campaign to undermine the socialist system, especially after Congress accused China of exporting goods made with prison labor and selling weapons to rogue regimes in the Middle East (as far back as 1987, Beijing had been accused of selling Silkworm anti-ship missiles to Iran). Sino-US military ties were also abruptly terminated in 1989 and all technology transfers and sales of US military equipment to China cancelled.

During the Persian Gulf crisis in 1990–91, China condemned Iraq's invasion of Kuwait, but also criticized the UN intervention, stating that it was a local issue that should be resolved strictly by the Arab states.

==== Deng's Southern Tour ====
In the spring of 1992, Deng Xiaoping suddenly reappeared in public and embarked on a tour of southern China to restore faith in his reforms and stop the country's slide back into Maoism (on the trip, he criticized the CCP for its "continuing leftism"). The visit was not only Deng's last major public appearance, but also seen as a test for the direction of the new leadership. Deng's renewed push for a market-oriented economy received official sanction at the 14th National Congress of the Chinese Communist Party later in the year as a number of younger, reform-minded leaders began their rise to top positions. The congress also affirmed the position of Jiang Zemin, a former Communist Party secretary of Shanghai, as the new General Secretary of the Chinese Communist Party and "core of CCP leadership", paving the way of Jiang becoming the "Third-generation" leadership figure. Deng and his supporters argued that further reform was necessary to raise China's standard of living. After the visit, the Communist Party Politburo publicly issued an endorsement of Deng's policies of economic openness. Though not completely eschewing political reform, China has consistently placed overwhelming priority on the opening of its economy. Relations with the West also improved by 1993, after Deng reminded the CCP leadership that China did not have the technological or financial resources to confront the US or be a geopolitical player, that capitalism and democracy were currently in the ascendancy, and that there was no choice but to practice a passive foreign policy.

Although another massive protest is unlikely in the near future, social instability due to economic conflicts has become a greater challenge for the third and fourth generation of leaders. Politically, however, Deng's experiment separating the governance of Party, Government and Military have proven to be a failed strategy under the current political system. During the recovery period, Jiang Zemin took the office of General Secretary of the CCP, President of China, and Chairman of the Central Military Commission, securing political stability, and centralizing power yet again.

=== Deng's legacy ===
Deng Xiaoping was one of only a few peasant revolutionaries to lead China, along with Mao Zedong and the founders of the Han and Ming dynasties. Deng's policies opened up the economy to foreign investment and market allocation within a socialist framework, and put into practice a daring and unprecedented system that allowed free enterprise and capitalist ideas to grow and compensate for each other under a single-party political system. Since his death, under Jiang's leadership, mainland China has sustained an average of 8% GDP growth annually, achieving one of the world's highest rates of per capita economic growth, and became the world's fastest growing major economy.

Also as mentioned, due in part to "socialist" measures and price/currency controls, the inflation characteristic of the years leading up to the Tiananmen protests had subsided. Political institutions have stabilized, due to the institutionalization of procedure of the Deng years and a generational shift from peasant revolutionaries to well-educated, professional technocrats. At the beginning of the 1990s it seemed that social problems have eased as well, as China rapidly became a more modern and prosperous nation. According to journalist Jim Rohwer, for example, "the Dengist reforms of 1979-1994 brought about probably the biggest single improvement in human welfare anywhere at any time." Deng's reforms lifted hundreds of millions of people out of poverty.

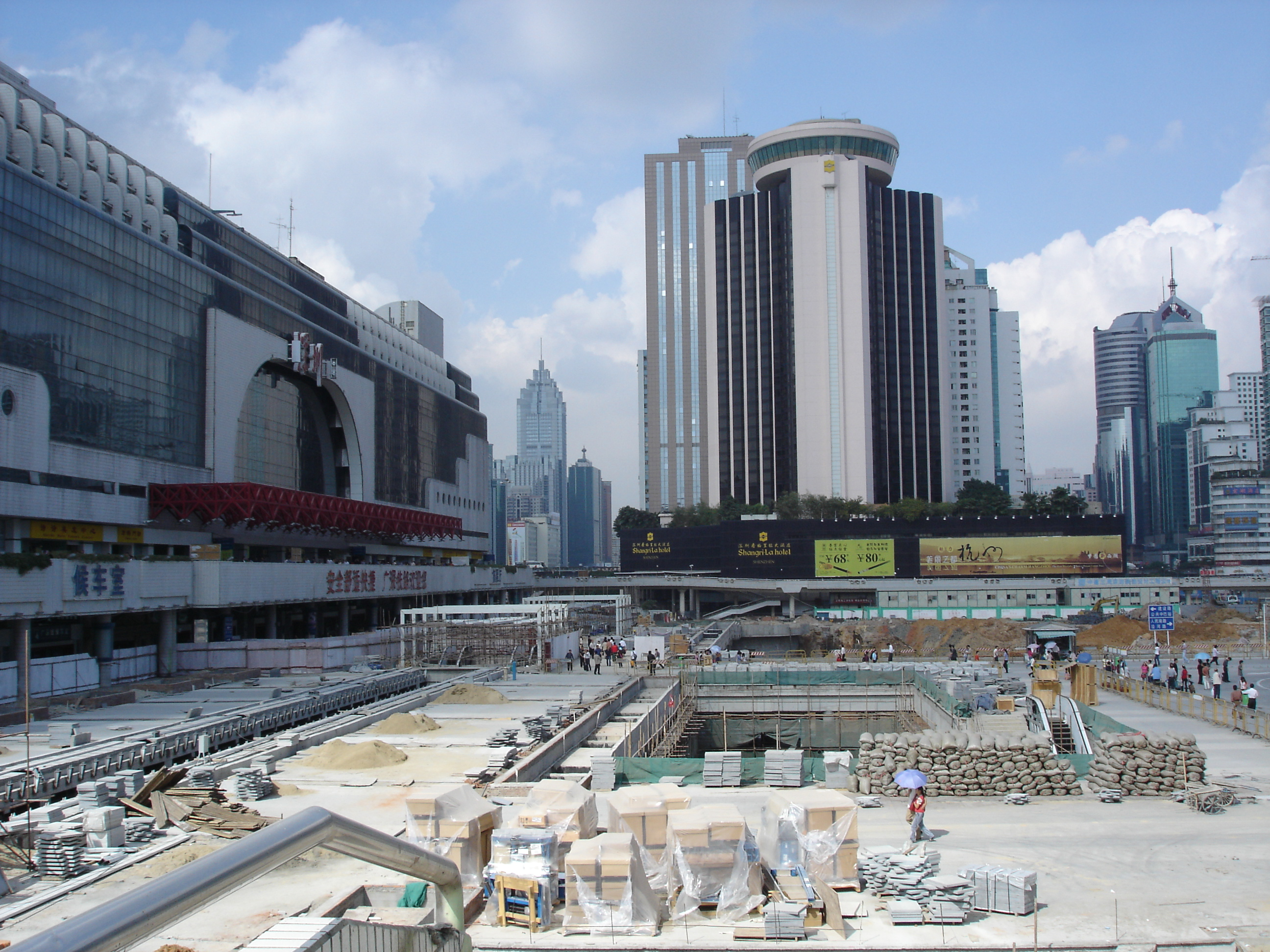
Construction work in Shenzhen, considered a powerful symbol of Deng's reformist legacy

The reforms, however, have left a number of issues, mainly in the social and political arena, unresolved. As a result of his market reforms, it became obvious by the mid-1990s that many state-owned enterprises (owned by the central government, unlike TVEs publicly owned at the local level) were unprofitable and needed to be shut down to prevent them from being a permanent and unsustainable drain on the economy. As the pace of urbanization continued to increase, urban unemployment became a serious problem, and urban housing shortages caused the rise of low-income slums in major urban centres like Shanghai and Guangzhou. Furthermore, by the mid-1990s most of the benefits of Deng's reforms, particularly in agriculture, had run their course; rural incomes had become stagnant, leaving Deng's successors in search of new means to boost economic growth in rural areas, or else risk a massive social implosion.

Finally, Deng's policy of asserting the primacy of economic development, while maintaining the rule of the Communist Party, has raised questions about its legitimacy. Many observers both inside and outside of China question the degree to which a one-party system can indefinitely maintain control over an increasingly dynamic and prosperous Chinese society. Questions have also been raised about the amount of foreign enterprise within China, and the time it takes before the government will no longer be able to effectively control private enterprise to fit their standards.

Deng Xiaoping died on February 19, 1997. His successor Jiang Zemin delivered an official eulogy to the late revolutionary and Long March veteran stating, "The Chinese people love Comrade Deng Xiaoping, thank Comrade Deng Xiaoping, mourn for Comrade Deng Xiaoping, and cherish the memory of Comrade Deng Xiaoping because he devoted his life-long energies to the Chinese people, performed immortal feats for the independence and liberation of the Chinese nation." His ideology, Deng Xiaoping Theory, became an official "guiding ideology" in the national Constitution in the subsequent meeting of the National People's Congress.

== Return of Hong Kong and Macau ==
Hong Kong was returned to Chinese control after a 99-year-lease to Britain on July 1, 1997. The agreement reverting control had applied Deng's theory of One Country, Two Systems. Hong Kong was to maintain independence in all areas except for foreign affairs and defense, withholding any major changes for another fifty years. Macau reverted to Chinese control under a similar agreement with Portugal on December 20, 1999. The two former colonies kept separate legal systems. The return of the two colonies meant the installation of an unprecedented political system, and the legal matters involved thereof, especially those involving Hong Kong's Basic Law, became the subject of constant debate. The subject of the amount of control the Mainland has over the former colonies' political institutions had raised many questions both internally and abroad. Some debate ensued over the legitimacy of Hong Kong's Chief Executive Tung Chee-hwa and the level of democracy in Hong Kong, as the colony is supposed to remain economically independent from the mainland for another fifty years. Hong Kong is also fighting against Shanghai to keep its status as the regional commercial hub.

== Third generation of leaders ==
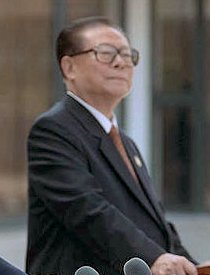
Jiang Zemin, the core of the "Third Generation" of Leadership

Deng's health deteriorated in the years prior to his death in 1997. During that time, General secretary Jiang Zemin and other members of his generation gradually assumed control of the day-to-day functions of government. This "third generation" leadership governed collectively with Jiang at the "core". Jiang was initially seen as an unlikely candidate for the position of General Secretary, and was believed to be simply a power transition figure. In reality, however, Jiang's era saw the return to complete, centralized leadership by 1998, after ousting rival party senior leader Qiao Shi and firmly taking the positions of the CCP General secretary, the President, and the Chairman of the Central Military Commission, becoming paramount leader of China's tripartite Party-State-Military functional structure.

With support from Jiang Zemin and Li Peng, then General secretary and Premier respectively, the government enacted tough macroeconomic control measures. The PRC began expunging low-tech, duplicated projects and sectors and projects in transport, energy, agriculture and sectors, averting violent market fluctuations. Attention has focused on strengthening agriculture, still the economic base of the developing country and on continuing a moderately tight monetary policy.

In September 1997, Jiang was re-elected CCP general secretary during the 15th CCP National Congress. In March 1998, Jiang was re-elected President during the 9th National People's Congress. Premier Li Peng was constitutionally required to step down from that post. He was elected to the chairmanship of the National People's Congress. Vice Premier Zhu Rongji was nominated as premier of the State Council to replace Li and confirmed by the Ninth National People's Congress (NPC) on March 17, 1998, at the First NPC Session. He was re-elected Politburo Standing Committee member of 15th CCP Central Committee in September 1997. Zhu was believed to be a tougher and more charismatic leader compared to the generally unpopular Li Peng.

=== Falun Gong ===
While the government under Jiang Zemin allowed further opening of the Chinese economy, a more liberal and materialistic environment gave way to the emergence of various schools of new-age social and religious thinking in what is known as Qigong fever. Falun Gong (法轮功 lit. The Practice of the Wheel of Law) founded by Li Hongzhi in 1992, was one such qigong practice which holds some similar beliefs to Buddhism and Taoism. It was allowed to grow for a few years, under CCP supervision.

After criticism of the qigong practices by academics and certain inner party elements began in 1999, Falun Gong practitioners initiated group appeals or letter writing to local party and government leadership to restrict what practitioners considered "unfair" media criticism. A newspaper article denouncing "teenagers practicing Qi Gong," with some parts specifically targeting Falun Gong, in Tianjin in April triggered a series of events which eventually led to over 10,000 practitioners silently protesting outside the Beijing Zhongnanhai compound to call for the release of detained practitioners. Premier Zhu Rongji met with several Falun Gong representatives and agreed to a few, but not all their demands. Some political analysts have suggested that Jiang was using the situation to strengthen his own core of CCP leadership, while CCP supporters contend that Falun Gong's continual spread would result in unwanted political instability.

On June 10, 1999, the government set up the "6-10 Office", an extra-constitutional organization in charge of the crackdown on "heterodox faiths", which included Falun Gong. China's state-controlled media vilified Falun Gong and denounced it as an unhealthy element in society. On 22 July, the PRC Ministry of Civil Affairs outlawed the Falun Dafa Research Society as an illegal organization "engaged in illegal activities, advocating superstition and spreading fallacies, hoodwinking people, inciting and creating disturbances, and jeopardizing social stability", coinciding with a concerted media assault. State television's prime time Xinwen Lianbo that day was extended to three hours from half an hour. It and many provincial and municipal TV networks labeled Falun Gong as an "evil cult". Regular programming was changed in many cases for up to a week. On July 23, the People's Daily contained a full-page editorial attacking the movement. On July 22, 1999, Falun Gong's exiled founder Li Hongzhi published a statement in which he called on international governments, organizations, and people for support, claiming that Falun Gong was without any particular structure, had no political objectives, nor had ever been involved in any anti-government activities.

Human rights organisations noted that Falun Gong and its supporters claim that since 1999, thousands of practitioners have been tortured, beaten, subjected to psychiatric abuses, put in forced labour camps, and that tens of thousands more have been imprisoned. Falun Gong practitioners, including western practitioners travelling to China to protest, have continued to appeal for an end to the persecution and legalisation of the practice. Practitioners inside China have continued to resist and oppose what they see as the state controlled media's propaganda campaigns against Falun Gong, but continue to be met with harassment, arrests, torture or worse, according to Falun Gong sources.

=== Economic development ===
Amidst maintaining political stability, Premier Zhu Rongji kept things on track in the difficult years of the late 1990s, maintaining mainland China's averaged growth at 9.7% a year over the two decades to 2000. The ability of the PRC to chart an effective course through the recent Asian Financial crisis, which crippled Southeast and East Asian economies (including that of Hong Kong and Taiwan), was also rather noteworthy. Part of the survival was owed to the state's overall control of the economy. Against the backdrop of the Asian financial crisis and the catastrophic 1998 Yangtze River Floods, mainland China's GDP still grew by 7.9% in the first nine months of 2002, beating the government's 7% target despite a global economic slowdown. Active state intervention to stimulate demand through wage increases in the public sector and other measures showed certain strengths in the Chinese economic system in times of hardship.

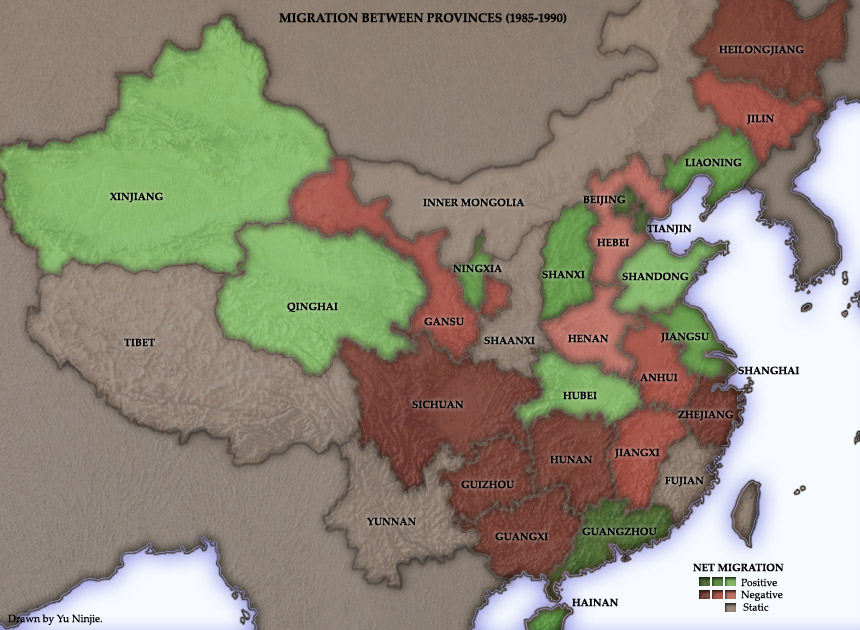
The reform and opening up has triggered internal migrations within China. Click on the image for more information.

While foreign direct investment (FDI) worldwide halved in 2000, the flow of capital into mainland China rose 10%. As global firms scramble to avoid missing the China boom; FDI in China has risen 22.6% in 2002. While global trade stagnated, growing by one percent in 2002, mainland China's trade soared by 18% in the first nine months of 2002, with exports outstripping imports.

Zhu tackled deep-seated structural problems which more conservative leaders were afraid of letting go. Uneven development was a major issue, as was the remaining state-owned enterprises. In addition, inefficient state firms and a banking system mired in bad loans and lost funds to foreign countries. Substantial disagreements over economic policy resulted in the party leadership, as the tensions focused on the pace of change. Zhu was long known to have been involved in a divisive relationship with CCP leader Jiang.

The PRC leadership was also struggling to modernize and privatize State-owned enterprises (SOEs) without inducing massive urban unemployment. A generation of people that suffered due to the Cultural Revolution that lacked the proper education or applicable skills has found it increasingly difficult to find a stable place in the increasingly privatized workforce. As millions lost their jobs as state firms closed, Zhu demanded financial safety nets for unemployed workers. Much of this job loss resulted from the large-scale layoffs of state-owned enterprise employees in the late 1990s, a process known as xiagang (下岗), which marked the end of guaranteed lifetime employment for many urban workers. While mainland China will need 100 million new urban jobs in the next five years to absorb laid off workers and rural migrants; so far they have been achieving this aim due to high per capita GDP growth. Under the auspices of Zhu and Wen Jiabao, his top deputy and successor, the state has been alleviating unemployment while promoting efficiency by pumping tax revenues into the economy and maintaining consumer demand.

Critics have charged that there is an oversupply of manufactured goods, driving down prices and profits while increasing the level of bad debt in the banking system. But demand for Chinese goods, domestically and abroad, is high enough to put those concerns to rest in the time being. Consumer spending is growing, boosted, in large part, due to longer workers' holidays.

Zhu's right-hand man, then Vice-Premier Wen Jiabao oversaw regulations for the stock market, campaigned to develop poorer inland provinces to stem migration and regional resentment. Zhu and Wen have been setting tax limits for peasants to protect them from high levies by corrupt officials. Well respected by ordinary Chinese citizens, Zhu also holds the respect of Western political and business leaders, who found him reassuring and credit him with clinching China's market-opening World Trade Organization (WTO) deal, which has brought foreign capital pouring into the country. Zhu remained as Premier until the National People's Congress met in March 2003, when it approved his struggle to clinch trusted deputy Wen Jiabao as his successor. Like his fourth-generation colleague Hu Jintao, Wen's personal opinions are difficult to discern since he sticks very closely to his script. Unlike the frank strong-willed Zhu, Wen, who has earned a reputation as an equally competent manager, is known for his suppleness and discretion.

== Crises abroad ==
The downturn in relations with the US during the 1990s was not totally related to the Tiananmen Square Massacre, but numerous other factors including the end of the Cold War which made Sino-US cooperation less important or useful. The transition to a de facto unipolar geopolitical landscape and US military actions around the globe, from the Persian Gulf to Haiti to the Balkans, were received with dismay by Beijing.

In 1995–96, the old issue of Taiwan's political status returned to the forefront after having largely been swept under the rug during the years of amicable Sino-US relations in the 1970s-80s. Beijing was disturbed by the island's transition to a multiparty democracy in 1987 and after the fallout in relations with the US in the early 1990s, American arms sales to Taipei were stepped up. In a speech to the Central Military Commission in 1993, General Secretary Jiang Zemin spoke of China's primary strategic concern being the prevention of Taiwan from declaring political independence.

During this time, China began a significant military modernization program and a move away from Maoist ideas of "people's war" with a vast, lightly armed infantry force. Although arms sales from the US had been ended in 1989, China found a new arms supplier in post-Soviet Russia, which was in rather desperate economic straits during the 1990s and was willing to sell armaments to nearly anyone willing to pay.

The CCP during this time began conscious efforts to remove the PLA from direct involvement in high-level political decisions, and as of 2017, no PLA general has sat in the Politburo Standing Committee since 1997. In 1998, the PLA was directed to abandon economic and business activities and focus strictly on defense matters. However, this edict proved less than effective as many army officers, enjoying lavish profits, simply continued business activities in a more surreptitious fashion. Corruption and selling of army posts to the highest bidder has continued to be endemic in the PLA.

With Taiwanese presidential elections due up in 1996, Beijing began a significant arms buildup near the Taiwan Straits. The PLA conducted two major military exercises in July 1995 and March 1996, apparently to intimidate Taiwan into not electing a pro-independence president. In response, US president Bill Clinton dispatched the US 7th Fleet to the region in a major show of force. China abruptly pulled back.

Aggressive posturing towards Taiwan ultimately proved self-defeating for Beijing since it sowed increased distrust with the US and China's neighbors. US-Japanese military ties were stepped up, and in 1997, Washington and Tokyo concluded a renewed "Guidelines for Defense Cooperation" pact.

In 1999, Sino-US relations took another ugly downturn when NATO forces undergoing bombing operations in Yugoslavia during the Kosovo War bombed the Chinese embassy in Belgrade. Three Chinese journalists died in the bombing, and Beijing reacted harshly. Mass anti-US protests rocked the streets of Beijing in the largest public demonstrations to take place since the pro-democracy movement 10 years earlier. Despite US statements that the bombing was accidental, China did not accept this explanation, bitterly condemning the action and demanding a full apology. In an official statement, then-vice president Hu Jintao declared the action as "barbaric" and behind the basic principle of ignorant "American hegemony". In the same statement he raised traditional slogans regarding the strength of the Chinese people, to rally behind the government and Jiang's leadership a huge portion of the populace. As protests escalated, the Central Government began changing its tone in an attempt to calm the outpouring wave of nationalism.

Further aggravating relations with the US in 1999 were accusations of Chinese espionage at the Los Alamos Nuclear Lab in New Mexico.

Around the start of the 21st century, although China had a relatively healthy economy with increased foreign investment, it faced a more precarious position on the global scale. Human rights became the concern for many western governments, and most leaders of western powers mention the issue every time on an official state visit. Pro-Taiwan Independence forces of the Democratic Progressive Party won the elections in Taiwan for the first time, limiting talks of Chinese unification. Li Teng-hui published his "Two Countries Statement", the first of its kind labeling Taiwan as an independent entity separate from China.

Yet another clash with the United States occurred in April 2001 when a US spyplane collided with a Chinese jet fighter over the South China Sea, killing the Chinese pilot, whose remains were never recovered. The American EP-3E spyplane was forced to land on Hainan Island, after which Chinese authorities promptly detained the crew and confiscated the aircraft. After two weeks of negotiations, the crew were released. Three months later, China returned the plane to the US in pieces.

Meanwhile, in July 2001, the PRC and Russia signed the 20-year Treaty of Friendship and Cooperation, aimed at increasing Sino-Russian cooperation and mutual assistance in various areas, covering economic, military, diplomatic (including Taiwan), energy and ecological fronts. The move was seen as another step towards balancing out US dominance in global affairs. China and Russia had also agreed upon a complete border treaty between the two countries.

== See also ==
- List of vice premiers of the People's Republic of China
