= Fengman Dam =

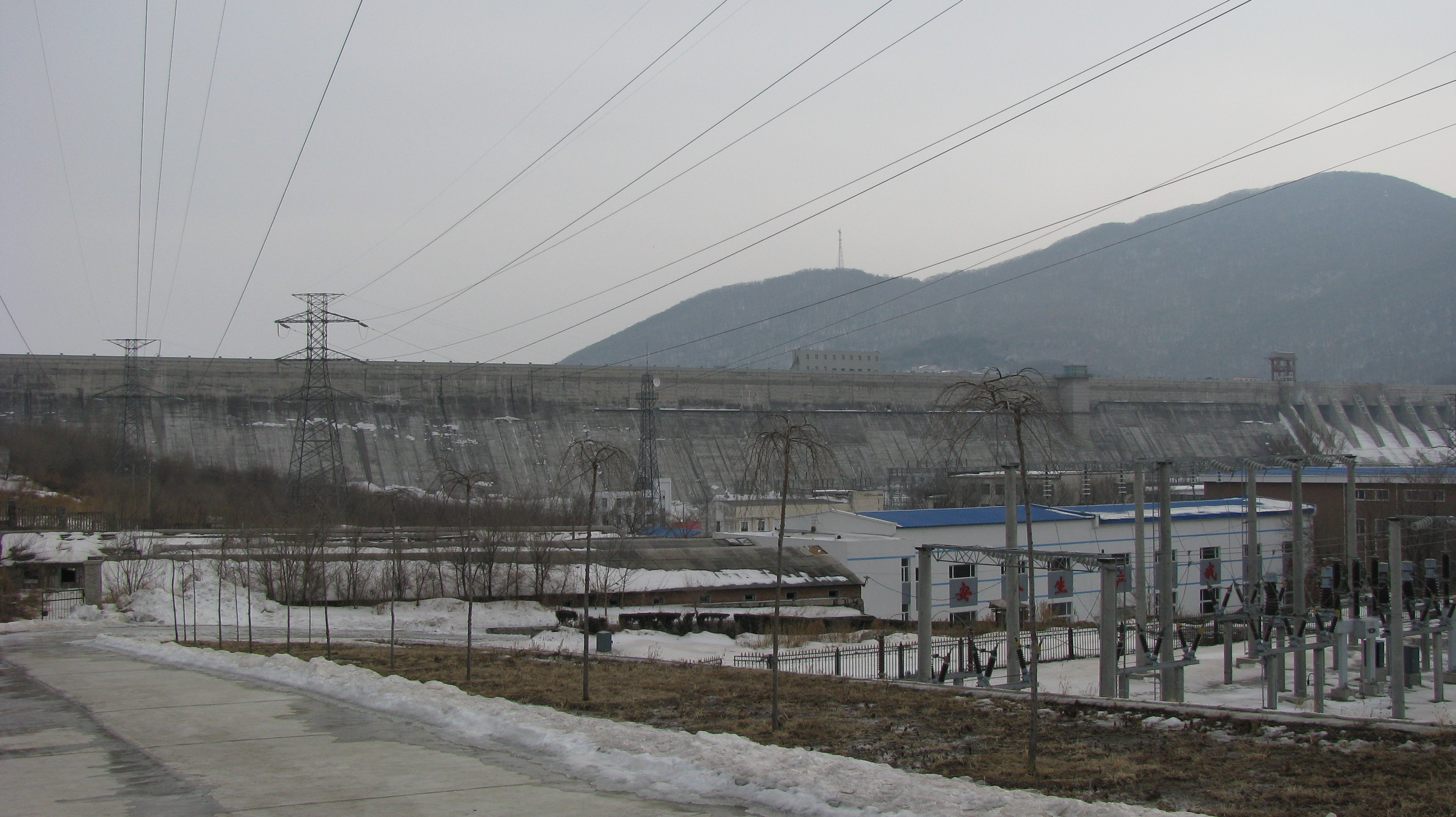

- Location within China
- Country: China
- Location: Jilin City, Jilin Province
- Coordinates: 43°43′10″N 126°41′19″E
- Status: In use
- Construction began: 1937
- Opening date: 1953
- Demolition date: 2019
- Owner: Northeast China Grid Company Limited

Dam and spillways
- Type of dam: Gravity
- Impounds: Second Songhua River
- Height: 91 m (299 ft)
- Length: 1,080 m (3,543 ft)
- Width (crest): 13.5 m (44 ft)
- Spillway type: 11 floodgates, 1 discharge tunnel
- Spillway capacity: Gates:9,240 m^{3}/s (326,308 cu ft/s); Tunnel:1,186 m^{3}/s (41,883 cu ft/s)

Reservoir
- Creates: Fengman Reservoir (Songhua Lake)
- Total capacity: 11,460,000,000 m^{3} (9,290,773 acre⋅ft)
- Catchment area: 42,500 km^{2} (16,409 sq mi)
- Surface area: 550 km^{2} (212 sq mi)
- Maximum water depth: 75 m (246 ft)

Power Station
- Commission date: Stage I: 1943-1959; Stage II: 1992; Stage III: 1998
- Type: Conventional
- Hydraulic head: 110 m (361 ft) (design)
- Turbines: 1 X 60 MW, 2 X 65 MW, 1 x 72.5 MW, 4 x 83 MW, 2 x 85 MW, 2 X 140 MW Francis turbines
- Installed capacity: 1,002.5 MW
- Annual generation: 1890 GWh

The Fengman Dam is a concrete gravity dam 20 km (12 mi) from Jilin City on the Second Songhua River in Jilin Province, China. The main purposes of the dam are hydroelectric power generation and flood control. Construction of the dam began in 1937 and was complete in 1953. The dam is owned and operated by Northeast China Grid Company Limited.

A new dam was completed in 2019, and the old dam will be dismantled, except for a small section preserved for historical interest.

== History ==
Construction on the Fengman Dam began in 1937 under the Japanese during their occupation of parts of China during World War II. In November 1942, the reservoir behind the dam began to fill and by March 1943, the first generators were operational. Still lacking floodgates, the dam was not entirely complete after the Japanese occupation in 1953. In 1959, the eighth and final generator of the first stage was installed, bringing the power station's installed capacity to 552.5 MW. Between 1970 and 1979, a tunnel was installed on the left bank of the dam and it was later converted into a flood discharge tunnel in 1991. In 1988, the second stage of construction began which included the installation of a ninth and tenth turbine. This was complete in 1992 and the plant's total installed capacity was 722.5 MW. From 1993 to 1998, the third stage of constructed on the dam was carried out, bringing the power station to a final installed capacity of 1002.5 MW.

== Reservoir ==
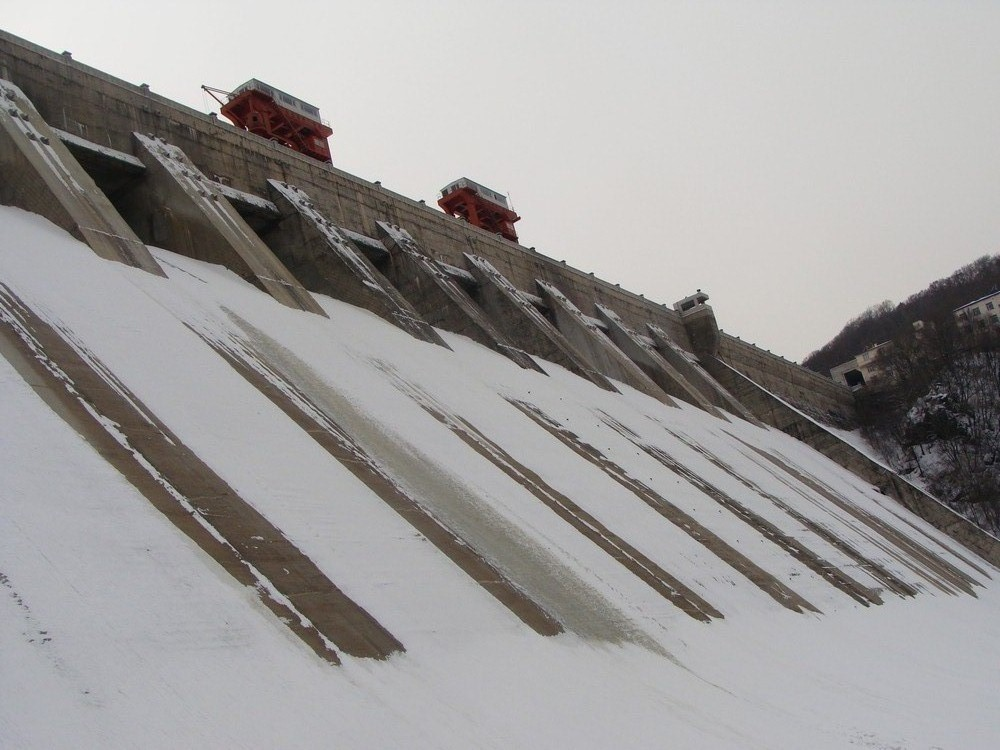

The Fengman Reservoir, also known as Songhua Lake, has a capacity of 11,460,000,000 m^{3} (9,290,773 acre⋅ft) of which 5,350,000,000 m^{3} (4,337,316 acre⋅ft) is active or "useful" storage and 2,670,000,000 m^{3} (2,164,604 acre⋅ft) is used for flooding. The reservoir is narrow, 180 km (112 mi) long, and has a surface area of 550 km^{2} (212 sq mi). Normal reservoir level is 261 m (856 ft) above sea level, minimum is 242 m (794 ft) and a maximum of 267 m (876 ft). The drainage or catchment area is 42,500 km^{2} (16,409 sq mi) of which 19,000 km^{2} (7,336 sq mi) is controlled by the Baishan Dam, 11,600 km^{2} (4,479 sq mi) is located within the Daogou area and 11,900 km^{2} (4,595 sq mi) is controlled by the Hongshi Dam. Annual rainfall in the reservoir zone is 500 mm (20 in) - 1,020 mm (40 in) with 60-90 percent falling between July and September each year. Average mean runoff is 426 m^{3}/s (15,044 cu ft/s), maximum mean is 737 m^{3}/s (26,027 cu ft/s) while the minimum mean is 164 m^{3}/s (5,792 cu ft/s). Maximum instantaneous runoff during flooding can reach 22,800 m^{3}/s (805,174 cu ft/s) while during ice season, it can be as low as 10 m^{3}/s (353 cu ft/s).

== Design ==
The Fengman dam is a 91 m (299 ft) high and 1,080 m (3,543 ft) long concrete gravity dam which is divided into 60 18 m (59 ft)sections. Sections 1–8, 20 and 32-60 are non-overflow while 9-19 contain the 11 crest overflow spillways. Sections 21-31 contain the ten intakes and penstocks for the power plant which rest at their base, the dam's toe. The dam's crest spillway has a 9,240 m^{3}/s (326,308 cu ft/s) capacity while the 683 m (2,241 ft) long, 9.2 m (30 ft) diameter flood discharge tunnel on the left bank has a 1,186 m^{3}/s (41,883 cu ft/s) capacity.

== New Dam ==
A new dam was constructed 120m downstream of the old dam, during the period 2015-2019

The new dam is 50% higher than the old one, and has 50% more electrical generation capacity. As the last of the new turbines was installed in 2019, work started on dismantling the old dam.

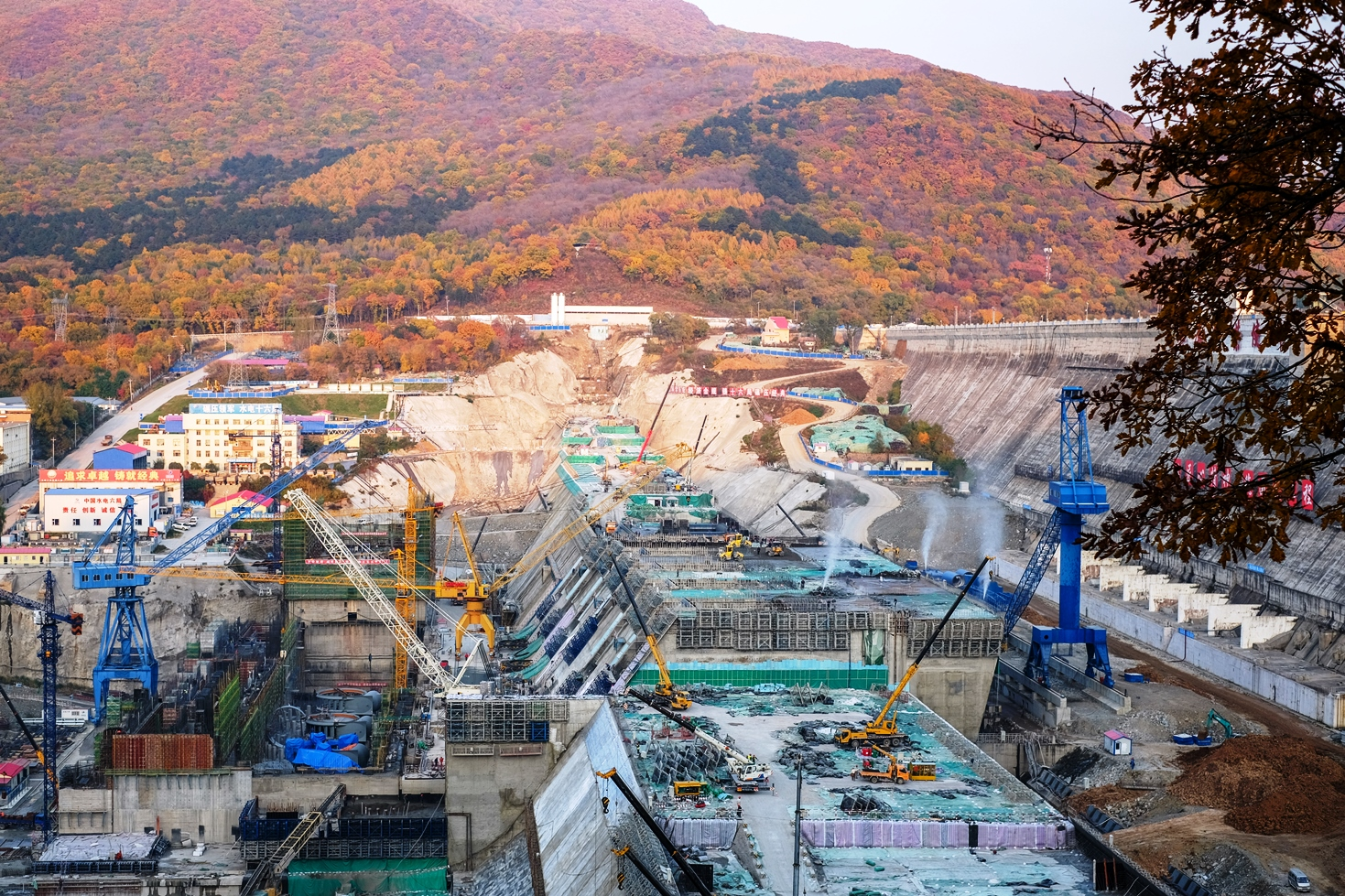
New Fengman Dam being built

== See also ==
- List of power stations in China
