= Meihekou =

Meihekou 梅河口市
- County-level & Sub-prefectural city
- Meihekou in Tonghua

- Location in Jilin
- Coordinates (Meihekou government): 42°32′27″N 125°42′39″E
- Country: People's Republic of China
- Province: Jilin
- Prefecture-level city: Tonghua
- Seat: Xinhua Subdistrict (新华街道)

Area
  - County-level & Sub-prefectural city: 2,174.6 km^{2} (839.6 sq mi)
  - Urban: 80.00 km^{2} (30.89 sq mi)
- Elevation: 180 m (590 ft)

Population (2009)
  - County-level & Sub-prefectural city: 617,262
  - Estimate (2017): 709,000
  - Density: 283.85/km^{2} (735.17/sq mi)
  - Urban: 285,100
  - Hukou permits: 183,565
- Time zone: UTC+8 (China Standard)
- Postal code: 135000

Meihekou (Chinese: 梅河口; pinyin: Méihékǒu; lit. 'Plum River Mouth') is a city of 600,000 in Jilin, People's Republic of China. It is a regional transport hub, connecting three railway lines, all of which are single track, and two national highways. The city is also a major lorry transshipment point in the region as it is also the junction of two trunk roads, connected to Liaoyuan in the northwest. The city is administratively a county-level city of the prefecture-level city of Tonghua, and is its northernmost county-level division.

== Geography ==
Meihekou is located in southwestern Jilin province at latitudes 42° 08' to 43° 02' N and longitudes 125° 15' to 126° 03' E, stretching 97 kilometres (60 mi) north−south and 35 kilometres (22 mi) west−east. It is in the western foothills of the Changbai Mountains and on the upper reaches of the Huifa River (辉发河). Bordering county-level divisions are Huinan County to the east, Liuhe County to the south and southeast, Qingyuan Manchu Autonomous County (Liaoning) to the southwest, Dongfeng County to the west and northwest.

=== Climate ===
Climate data for Meihekou, elevation 341 m (1,119 ft), (1991–2020 normals, extremes 1971–2010)
Month	Jan	Feb	Mar	Apr	May	Jun	Jul	Aug	Sep	Oct	Nov	Dec	Year
Record high °C (°F)	6.2 (43.2)	13.9 (57.0)	18.8 (65.8)	29.9 (85.8)	33.5 (92.3)	35.2 (95.4)	36.1 (97.0)	34.4 (93.9)	30.4 (86.7)	28.9 (84.0)	20.0 (68.0)	10.8 (51.4)	36.1 (97.0)
Mean daily maximum °C (°F)	−7.7 (18.1)	−2.7 (27.1)	4.8 (40.6)	14.7 (58.5)	21.7 (71.1)	25.9 (78.6)	28.0 (82.4)	26.9 (80.4)	22.2 (72.0)	14.2 (57.6)	3.1 (37.6)	−5.5 (22.1)	12.1 (53.8)
Daily mean °C (°F)	−14.6 (5.7)	−9.5 (14.9)	−1.1 (30.0)	8.1 (46.6)	15.4 (59.7)	20.4 (68.7)	23.1 (73.6)	21.7 (71.1)	15.4 (59.7)	7.3 (45.1)	−2.5 (27.5)	−11.6 (11.1)	6.0 (42.8)
Mean daily minimum °C (°F)	−20.3 (−4.5)	−15.4 (4.3)	−6.4 (20.5)	2.1 (35.8)	9.4 (48.9)	15.4 (59.7)	18.9 (66.0)	17.3 (63.1)	9.8 (49.6)	1.7 (35.1)	−7.3 (18.9)	−16.8 (1.8)	0.7 (33.3)
Record low °C (°F)	−37.7 (−35.9)	−34.7 (−30.5)	−27.6 (−17.7)	−12.2 (10.0)	−5.4 (22.3)	5.4 (41.7)	9.9 (49.8)	4.5 (40.1)	−3.4 (25.9)	−12.0 (10.4)	−25.5 (−13.9)	−34.7 (−30.5)	−37.7 (−35.9)
Average precipitation mm (inches)	5.8 (0.23)	8.6 (0.34)	18.0 (0.71)	36.2 (1.43)	64.4 (2.54)	95.9 (3.78)	163.2 (6.43)	172.5 (6.79)	63.2 (2.49)	41.0 (1.61)	23.1 (0.91)	10.1 (0.40)	702 (27.66)
Average precipitation days (≥ 0.1 mm)	5.6	4.9	6.7	8.2	11.9	14.3	14.8	13.8	8.7	8.6	7.4	6.6	111.5
Average snowy days	9.2	7.4	8.7	3.2	0	0	0	0	0	2.0	7.7	9.9	48.1
Average relative humidity (%)	68	63	59	53	57	68	78	81	75	67	68	69	67
Mean monthly sunshine hours	173.6	186.8	216.4	213.9	236.8	223.6	205.2	205.7	217.0	197.3	157.7	154.1	2,388.1
Percentage possible sunshine	59	62	58	53	52	49	45	48	59	58	54	55	54
Source 1: China Meteorological Administration
Source 2: Weather China

== Administrative divisions ==
Subdistricts:

- Xinhua Subdistrict (新华街道), Jiefang Subdistrict (解放街道), Guangming Subdistrict (光明街道), Heping Subdistrict (和平街道), Fumin Subdistrict (福民街道)

Towns:

- Shancheng (山城镇), Hailong (海龙镇), Hongmei (红梅镇), Jinhua (进化镇), Xinhe (新合镇), Shuguang (曙光镇), Zhonghe (中和镇), Yizuoying (一座营镇), Shuidao (水道镇), Yezhuhe (野猪河镇), Kangdaying (康大营镇), Heishantou (黑山头镇), Niuxinding (牛心顶镇), Dawan (大湾镇)

Townships:

- Lilu Township (李炉乡), Shuangquan Township (双泉乡), Sibashi Township (四八石乡), Chengnan Township (城南乡), Yimin Township (义民乡), Xingling Township (杏岭乡), Jile Township (吉乐乡), Shuangxing Township (双兴乡), Xinghua Township (兴华乡), Jiangjiajie Township (姜家街乡), Wanlong Township (湾龙乡), Xiaoyang Manchu and Korean Ethnic Township (小杨满族朝鲜族乡), Huayuan Korean Ethnic Township (花园朝鲜族乡)

=== Population ===
During the 2010s the city experienced a population drop of over 30%. Nevertheless, by the 2020s, Meihekou experienced a 60% population growth rate, with the inhabitants going from 300,000 by mid-2010s to 420,000 in 2023.

== Economy ==
Meihekou was known as a center of agriculture and heavy industry. In recent years, the city has developed an alimentation industry, and also has promoted tourism.

== Transportation ==
Meihekou is a regional transport hub, connecting the Shenji (Shenyang−Jilin City; 沈吉铁路), the Simei (Siping−Meihekou; 四梅铁路), and the Meiji (Meihekou−Ji'an; 梅集铁路) Railways. The highways that pass through the area are the Heida (Heihe−Dalian) Highway and the Jixi (Ji'an−Xilinhot) Highway.
