= International reactions to the 2008 Tibetan unrest =

The 2008 Tibetan unrest was a series of protests and demonstrations met by excessive force, focused on the persecution of Tibetans, in the buildup to the 2008 Summer Olympics in Beijing. There was a mixture of outrage and understanding from leading figures abroad.

== Tibet ==
- (Tibet) 14th Dalai Lama

The 14th Dalai Lama in India called on the Chinese government to stop using force, and later urged the Tibetans to refrain from violence. He accused China of cloaking soldiers as monks to incite riots, and gave a picture as proof. He restated said that he is pursuing greater autonomy for Tibet, as opposed to full independence, and that he has "no desire to sabotage" the 2008 Summer Olympics.

- (Tibet) Central Tibetan Administration representative Dawa Tsering, in an interview with Radio France International's Chinese language program, answered a question about the Dalai Lama and his position on non-violence during the unrest. Tsering stated that:
  First of all, I must make it clear that the Tibetans have been non-violent throughout. From Tibetans' perspective, violence means harming life. From the video recordings, you can see that the Tibetans were beating Han Chinese, but only beating took place. After the beating, the Han Chinese were free to flee. Therefore, only beating, no life was harmed. Those who were killed were all results of accidents. From recordings shown by the Chinese Communist government, we can clearly see that when Tibetans were beating on their doors, the Han Chinese all went into hiding upstairs. When the Tibetans set fire to the buildings, the Han Chinese remained in hiding instead of escaping. The result is that these Han Chinese were all accidentally burnt to death. Those who set and spread the fire, on the other hand, had no idea whatsoever that there were Han Chinese hiding upstairs. Therefore, not only were Han Chinese burnt to death, some Tibetans were burnt to death, too. Therefore, all these incidents were accidents, not murder.

== Nations ==
Between March 28 and 29, 2008, the Chinese government organised a visit to Lhasa for 15 diplomats from Brazil, Japan, Canada, the European Union, the United Kingdom, Germany, France, Italy, Spain, Slovenia, Singapore, Tanzania, Australia, and the United States. Several diplomats said they were satisfied by the level of candour shown by the Tibet Autonomous Region government. Diplomats from Singapore and Tanzania expressed support for the actions of the Chinese government.

- Australia's Prime Minister, Kevin Rudd, urged the Chinese government to show "restraint," saying, "These are significant developments and therefore, have been the subject already of communication diplomatically between our two governments, and I imagine that those communications will continue." He said Australia recognised Chinese sovereignty over Tibet but called for dialogue between the two sides when he was giving speech in Peking University on April 9, 2008.
- Brazil - The Brazilian Government deplores the events in the Autonomous Region of Tibet which have led to the loss of human lives. In recalling its traditional support to the territorial integrity of the People's Republic of China, the Brazilian Government expresses its steadfast expectation that self-containment be exercised, so as to make possible an enduring solution which promotes peace and understanding in the Autonomous Region of Tibet, with full respect to cultural and religious differences.
- Canada's Prime Minister Stephen Harper made a public statement on March 20, 2008, saying, "Canada shares the concerns about what is happening in Tibet. As His Holiness the Dalai Lama told me when I met him, and as he has been saying recently, his message is one of non-violence and reconciliation, and I join him in that call. Canada calls upon China to fully respect human rights and peaceful protest." Canada also calls on China to show "restraint in dealing with this difficult situation."
- Colombia - The Ministry of Foreign Affairs of Colombia issued a statement saying that Colombia expresses its concern over recent violent events that have taken place in the People's Republic of China in the Tibet Autonomous Region. The Colombian Government is confident that necessary measures are taken to prevent the escalation of violence and to ensure the return to normalcy in this region. Colombia hopes for the successful realization of the Summer Olympic Games in the People's Republic of China in the current year, as they are independent of the events of Tibet.
- Cyprus - Foreign Minister Markos Kyprianou underlined that Cyprus supports the principle of “a single China” with its territorial integrity safeguarded. Referring to the recent developments in Tibet, he expressed the hope that the situation does not deteriorate, that there is no more loss of lives and that peace and stability will prevail in the region.
- Czech Republic's government demanded that the repressions cease immediately and all the preventively detained persons be released. The Czech government also called on the Chinese government to enable independent journalists to enter the area and have access to unbiased information. Czech President Václav Klaus also expressed concern about the current disturbances in Tibet and said that violence is no solution, either in Tibet or elsewhere in the world."We have been following with deep concern the reports on the current developments in Tibet that have taken a considerable toll in injuries and lost lives. We condemn violence against peaceful and unarmed protesters who seek to freely express their opinion. The use of force only leads to further worsening of the situation; that is why we call for maximum restraint.", said Karel Schwarzenberg, Minister of Foreign Affairs of the Czech Republic.
- The interim government of Fiji, led by Commodore Frank Bainimarama, sent an official letter to the Chinese government expressing support for China's actions to halt dissent in Tibet. Parmesh Chand, the Permanent Secretary of Fiji's Prime Minister's office, also commented that "...Fiji also believes that this is an internal matter for the Chinese government to deal with."
- (France) On March 19, the French State Secretary in charge of foreign affairs and human rights, Rama Yade, requested China "to stretch out [their] hand to the Dalai Lama" and to respect the Tibetans, while underlining that if this is not the case, the international community "will draw the consequences from this". On March 24, French president Nicolas Sarkozy requested that Chinese President Hu Jintao show restraint and called for "the end of violence through dialogue in Tibet." On March 25, he said : "I have an envoy who spoke with the authorities closest to the Dalai Lama and accordingly, I want the dialogue to begin, and I will adjust my response following the response given by the Chinese authorities." He also said that if he was not satisfied, he would not go to the Beijing Olympics. Sarkozy then turned up for the Beijing Olympics opening celebration, which showed that he was satisfied with Beijing's actions concerning Tibet.
- Germany's Chancellor Angela Merkel said in a statement on March 15 that "she was watching the violence in Tibet with concern." The German Foreign Ministry released the statement: "Everything must be done to prevent a further escalation of the situation and to enable a peaceful end to the conflict. Minister (Frank-Walter) Steinmeier calls on his Chinese counterparts to offer as much transparency as possible over the events in Tibet."
- Hungary - State Secretary László Várkonyi said that Hungary goes along with the Declaration issued on March 17 by the European Union's Slovene Presidency, expressing the EU's deep concern over the disturbances in Tibet, warning the involved parties to exercise self-restraint, calling the Chinese authorities to respond to the demonstrations in accordance with internationally recognised democratic principles, and urging the Chinese government to properly address the concerns of Tibetans with regard to issues of human rights.
- India's Ministry of External Affairs released the following statement: "We are distressed by reports of the unsettled situation and violence in Lhasa, and by the deaths of innocent people. We would hope that all those involved will work to improve the situation and remove the causes of such trouble in Tibet, which is an autonomous region of China, through dialogue and non-violent means." The statement was criticised by some opposition parties, who described them as an "inadequate response". Conservative Bharatiya Janata Party (BJP) member and Senior Vice President of the Indian Olympic Association MP Vijay Kumar Malhotra said in the parliament, "Over 100 innocent protesters have been massacred in Lhasa in the past one week by the Chinese security forces which are involved in ethnic cleansing... this house should condemn the incidents."
- Ireland: On Sunday April 13, 2008, the Irish Environment Minister John Gormley condemned Chinese suppression and exploitation of Tibetans and called on the Chinese government to enter into immediate negotiations with the Dalai Lama. The Chinese ambassador walked out of the Green Party conference in Dundalk, Co Louth, when Gormley referred to Tibet as a "country".
- Italy's Foreign Minister Massimo D'Alema said, "The Dalai Lama doesn't want independence, he's not trying to break up one China, but he does want recognition for the Tibetan people's rights, their history, and their religious expression."
- Japan's Chief Cabinet Secretary Nobutaka Machimura has stated that the unrest is "basically a domestic issue for China but we hope that both sides will exercise self-restraint so that the disturbance will not spread." Secretary Machimura also stated: "I would like to know clearly what the situation is and the facts behind what has happened. I hope all parties involved will deal with this calmly and ensure that the number of those killed and injured does not worsen any further." Kazuo Kodama, press secretary for the Ministry of Foreign Affairs, said in a statement that Japan is concerned about the situation in Tibet and was "closely watching the current situation in the city of Lhasa."
- Myanmar's government issued a statement saying it opposed any move to link the Beijing Olympics with the unrest, saying Tibet was an "internal affair" of China.
- Netherlands Member of Parliament Hans van Baalen (VVD) stated in the Dutch news' television show Netwerk that China should refrain from any violence other than absolutely necessary to maintain order in the region, and that China should start a dialog with the Dalai Lama in order to come to a peaceful solution. He also stated that any decision on whether or not to participate in the 2008 Olympic games was up to the athletes themselves.
- New Zealand's Parliament expressed its strong support for the right of people to protest peacefully and urged the Chinese authorities to react carefully and proportionately to protest and urged China to engage in meaningful dialogue with representatives of the Tibetan people in order to achieve a lasting resolution of problems in Tibet.
- North Korea denounced the unrest in Tibet and supported the efforts of People's Republic of China to stop the unrest. The Korean Central News Agency quoted a foreign ministry spokesman as saying, "Tibet is part of an inalienable territory of China. The DPRK government strongly denounces the unsavoury elements for their moves to seek ‘independence of Tibet’ and scuttle the upcoming Beijing Olympics."
- Pakistan's Foreign Office spokesman Mohammad Sadiq denounced protests in Tibet and said Pakistan was firmly opposed to any attempt to undermine China’s sovereignty and territorial integrity.
- Poland: Polish parliamentarians from the Parliamentary Group for Tibet issued a letter to Sun Rongmim, an ambassador of China in Poland, in which they expressed their demand of immediate release of the monks, while recalling that "it is not too late for an international boycott of the Beijing Olympics". In addition, the ambassador was summoned by the Minister of Foreign Affairs to present the situation in Tibet and heard about the information on the number of victims. On March 17, a group of Polish parliamentarians engaged in anti-communist opposition in the People's Republic of Poland issued an appeal calling for action "for the release of political prisoners in the People's Republic of China and respect for human rights and civil liberties in this country".
  - On March 18, Prime Minister Donald Tusk suggested the possibility of boycotting the Olympic opening by the representatives of the government. On March 19, a letter expressing support for the Dalai Lama was sent by president of the Constitutional Court - Jerzy Stępień. The same day, an official invitation to visit Poland wrote to the Dalai Lama Marshal of the Senate Bogdan Borusewicz.
  - On March 18, Presidium of the Home Commission of "Solidarity" communicated to the Embassy of the PRC and the International Labour Organization a letter, in which they urged the Chinese authorities to stop "persecution of the Tibetan people".
  - On March 21, his concern about the situation in Tibet was expressed by the president of Poland - Lech Kaczyński. He also issued a statement in which he stressed that "only the dialogue and respect for human rights, including religious rights, and good will on both sides renouncing violence and force is the road that could lead to a lasting, peaceful solution to the conflict".
- Republic of China's (Taiwan) foreign ministry issued a statement saying, "We strongly condemn China's use of force to suppress Tibet and urge the international community to monitor the development in Tibet." The Mainland Affairs Council also condemned the Chinese response.
- Russia said on March 17 that it hopes China's government "take all necessary measures to stop illegal actions and provide for the swiftest possible normalization of the situation." The Russian Foreign Ministry also said that any efforts to boycott the Beijing Olympics were "unacceptable." The Foreign Ministry also linked the events in Tibet with the recent declaration of independence by Kosovo, showing a growing movement of groups asking for independence.
- Serbia's Ministry of Foreign Affairs reiterated its support in principle to the policy of one China and to the respect of the sovereignty and territorial integrity of the People's Republic of China. Serbia maintains the stand that Tibet is an internal issue of China and respects the policy of the Chinese government regarding Tibet as an autonomous region.
- Singapore - Singapore supports the declared policy of the Chinese Government to protect the lives and property of its citizens from violent demonstrators with minimum use of force. We are opposed to the politicisation of the Olympics.
- South Korea's Ministry of Foreign Affairs and Trade spokesperson Cho Hee-young has stated that "the use of violence should be restrained, and the unrest should be solved peacefully without any further loss of human lives." Spokesperson Cho has also stated that the MOFAT is "closely monitoring" the situation and asks for full cooperation in ensuring the safety of any foreign nationals currently present in Tibet.
- Spain - The Government of Spain advocates that a lasting and acceptable solution should be reached through dialogue that preserves Tibetan culture within the People's Republic of China.
- Sri Lanka - The Government of Sri Lanka wishes to reaffirm its adherence to the “One China Policy” and the territorial integrity of China. Sri Lanka sincerely hopes that normalcy will return to the Tibetan Autonomous Region of China and further wishes that the disturbances will be brought to an end amicably with the Buddhist concept of “Ahimsa” and The “Noble Eightfold Path”.
- Sweden's Foreign Minister Carl Bildt condemned China for its crackdown on riots in Tibet, urging Chinese authorities to "fully respect Tibetan rights."
- Thailand - Thailand regards the Tibetan issue as an internal affair of the People's Republic of China. Thailand is against any attempts to link the Tibet Issue with China's hosting of the Olympic Games, which are mankind's heritage since ancient times. Thailand is hopeful that the government of the People's Republic of China will take measured actions that will soon bring back peace and harmony to the Tibet Autonomous Region in China.
- United Kingdom Prime Minister Gordon Brown told the House of Commons of the United Kingdom on March 19, 2008, that he has spoken to Chinese Premier Wen Jiabao to "urge an end to the violence". Mr Brown confirmed he will meet the Dalai Lama on his visit to Britain.
- United States ambassador to Beijing Clark T. Randt, Jr. urged China to exercise restraint. While meeting with the Dalai Lama in Dharmsala, House Speaker Nancy Pelosi called for an international investigation into the violence in Tibet and dismissed China's claim that the Dalai Lama was behind the unrest as making "no sense." President George W. Bush called President Hu Jintao of China on March 26, 2008. The President raised his concerns about the situation in Tibet and encouraged the Chinese government to engage in substantive dialogue with the Dalai Lama's representatives and to allow access for journalists and diplomats. Speaker Pelosi introduced, and the House of Representatives passed, a resolution that characterized China's response as "disproportionate and extreme". The resolution called on China to stop the crackdown on Tibetan dissent, to release all Tibetans imprisoned for nonviolent protests, and to begin an unconditional discussion with the Dalai Lama for a long-term solution that upholds Tibetans' human rights and dignity.
- Venezuela's President Hugo Chávez said "the (U.S.) imperialists want to divide China. And they're causing problems there in Tibet. They're trying to sabotage the Olympics in Beijing, and behind that is the hand of imperialism. We ask the world to support China to neutralize this plan. You see the images of the violence in Tibet. Who is that against? Against China. It's the (U.S.) empire that wants to weaken China, because China is rising up." Also according to Reuters, some leftists in Latin America see the Tibetan independence movement led by the Dalai Lama as a pro-Washington group of conservative monks.
- Vatican City - Pope Benedict XVI, during a weekly audience, appealed for dialogue and tolerance between Chinese and Tibetans, expressing "sadness and pain" over the violence in Tibet.
- Vietnam's Ministry of Foreign Affairs issued a statement calling all Tibet-related issues as China's internal affairs. "We believe that the Government of China will take appropriate measures to ensure public order and maintain social stability and economic development in Tibet in particular, and China in general."

== International organisations ==
- European Union leaders asked China to show restraint and for human rights to be respected. EU High Representative Javier Solana said this would not affect Europe's involvement in the Beijing Olympics.
- 17 September 2008, Lukas Machon of the International Commission of Jurists requested the Chinese authorities “to inform the Council (United Nations Human Rights Council) on the investigation into the crackdown” on the Tibetan Uprising and stated that “violent crackdown on the peaceful protest in Tibet on March ’08, including arbitrary executions, use of excessive non-lethal force by the security forces, and arbitrary detentions, has not been investigated to date.”
- In a joint statement, Society for Threatened Peoples, FORUM ASIA (Asia Forum for Human Rights and Development), Asian Indigenous & Tribal Peoples Network, and Movement against Racism and for Friendship amongst People (MRAP), declared : “The human rights crisis confronted by the Tibetan people demands the immediate attention as we urge the Council to take serious note of this deteriorating situation » and requested the Chinese authorities to receive the United Nations High Commissioner for Human Rights to visit Tibetan areas.
- UN High Commissioner for Human Rights Louise Arbour urged the Chinese government to allow protesters to "exercise their right to freedom of expression and assembly" and urged the Chinese government to refrain from excessive force or mistreatment of any individuals arrested. Secretary-General Ban Ki-moon urged for a "peaceful resolution" but said there would be no UN intervention.

== Protests ==
A series of protests were held around the world as a response to the unrest in Tibet. The protests in Tibet started on 10 March, on the anniversary of the failed uprising against the Chinese Communist government, and then spread to provinces of China where there were a large concentration ethnic of Tibetans, including Gansu and Qinghai

The Tibetan community in neighbouring India, where many Tibetans are settled, organised protests yearly on 10 March against the Chinese, particularly, in the town of Dharamsala - the fact that China is hosting the Olympics also featured prominently in the protests.

There were protests along the route taken by the Olympic torch. In France, the route had to be cut short due to the protests, while in London, attempts were made to snatch the torch and extinguish the flame. In San Francisco, the authorities changed the route to avoid protesters and US presidential hopeful Barack Obama asked for the games to be boycotted in China if it does not take steps to improve its human rights record.

== International protests ==
=== Asia ===
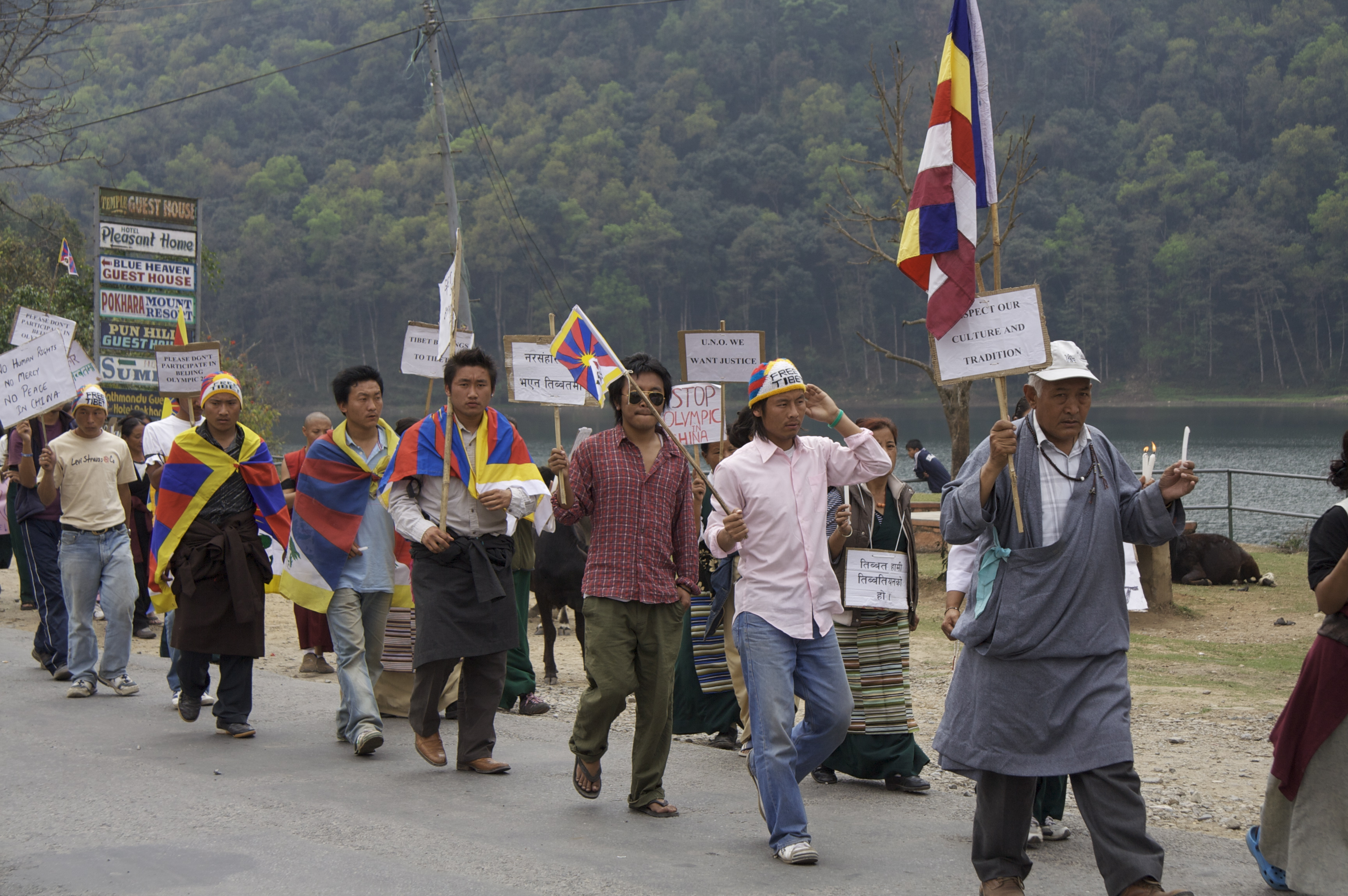
Ethnic Tibetans protest in Pokhara, Nepal

Tibetans living in the Indian state of Meghalaya closed their businesses and staged demonstrations to protest the Chinese crackdown in Tibet. Hundreds of Tibetan exiles in India marched from the town of Dharamsala to the Indo-Chinese border, to mark their protest against the Chinese occupation of Tibet. Indian authorities arrested more than 100 Tibetan protesters. Indian police also arrested a dozen Tibetan exiles attempting to storm the Chinese embassy in New Delhi.

In Tokyo, Japan, over 100 Tibetans living in Japan and members of a Japanese group supporting Tibetans in exile marched in Tokyo's Yoyogi Park, shouting slogans of protest against China on 16 March. It was originally planned as a part of the torch relay for Tibetan Olympics 2008. On March 22, 2008, over 900 Tibetan exiles and Japanese supporters protested in Roppongi, Tokyo. Zenkō-ji, a Japanese Buddhist temple that was originally scheduled to be the starting point for the Beijing Olympic torch relay in Nagano, withdrew from a plan to host the relay, citing safety concerns over the torch relay and by solidarity of monks with the Tibetan Buddhists. The temple was then vandalised.

44 Tibetan exiles were arrested by Nepali police in Kathmandu on Monday. Police used bamboo batons and tear gas to break up protests outside a UN complex in the latest crackdown on demonstrations by ethnic Tibetans in Nepal. The protesters insisted they were protesting peacefully.

In Insadong of Seoul, South Korea, several citizens gathered for protesting against the Chinese government. Many of them were from one group in particular, called "Tibet's Friends"(티베트의 친구들)

=== Europe ===
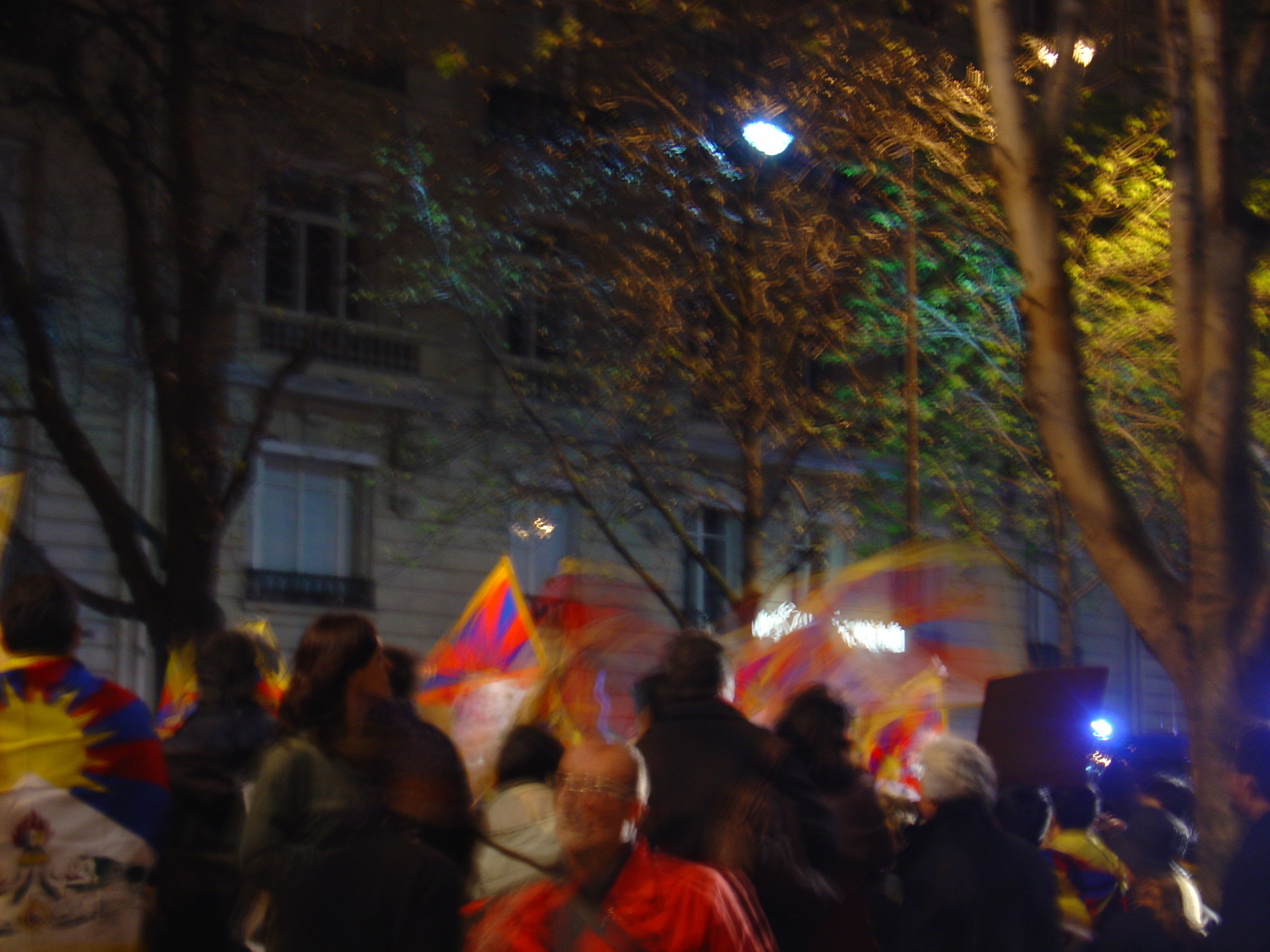
A Tibetan independence rally outside the Chinese embassy in Paris (16 March)

On Thursday, March 20 in Vienna, Austria, several Tibetans intruded upon the Embassy of China in Austria, taking down the Chinese national flag and damaging the Embassy facility. The Ambassador requested an urgent meeting with Foreign Affair Officers of Austria and protested at the inability of local police to protect the Embassy.

Tear gas was deployed by local riot police in Paris, France, on Sunday, March 16 where over 500 protesters gathered outside of Chinese embassy on Paris's chic avenue George V. A demonstrator managed to climb the building and removed the Chinese flag, replacing it with the Tibetan flag. 10 people were in police custody at the end of the demonstrations.

Tibetans in Germany stormed the Chinese Consulate in Munich on Monday, March 17. Protesters set the Chinese flag on fire and sprayed slogans, including "Save Tibet" and "Stop Killing" on the front door. 26 were detained by local police.

On March 24, 2008, during the Olympic torch lighting ceremony in Olympia, a French activist of the French-based group Reporters Without Borders managed to breach the security and tried to unfurl a banner behind China's Olympic chief Liu Qi, who was making his speech at the moment. The protester was quickly removed by security personnel. Later on, as the torch relay began, another Tibetan woman covered herself with red paint and lay on the ground, forcing torchbearers to weave around her as other protesters shouted "Flame of shame." The Greek government condemned the incident as disruptive.

In Budapest, Hungary, about 200 people held a protest at the Chinese Embassy. They chanted "Free Tibet", threw rocks and paint-sacks at the building, and broke one of its windows. Police arrested two protesters.

In Reykjavík, Iceland, police protected the Chinese Embassy as roughly forty protesters peacefully protested outside, chanting slogans and waving flags. Numerous Tibetan refugees participated in the protest. The steps leading up to the Chinese Embassy were covered in red paint by a protester, and three members of the political youth organisation Ungir Jafnaðarmenn attempted to deliver a letter of disapproval to the Chinese Embassy, which was closed prior to their arrival and surrounded by the police.

In Rome, Italy, several hundred Tibetans and Italians held a peaceful candlelight vigil outside the Chinese Embassy.

In Lithuania, a small group of Lithuanians held a peaceful protest in front of China's embassy in Vilnius on 17 March. On 20 April 2008, more than 60 bike riders protested on the streets of Vilnius, by the Chinese embassy, and demanded, at the Presidential palace, not to visit Olympic games opening in Beijing.

In The Hague, Netherlands, about 400 protesters attempted to storm the Chinese consulate. They managed to take down the Chinese flag and replace it with the Tibetan flag.

In Zürich, Swiss police fired tear-gas at Tibetan independence demonstrators who tried to storm the Chinese consulate.

In London, the United Kingdom, two protesters who had a history of interfering with the exhibition placed placards upon Terracotta Warriors on loan to the British Museum. On March 22, 2008, Tibetan exiles and British supporters protested in London. Security for the Olympic torch relay, which arrived in the UK on the 6th of April 2008, was enhanced over fears that it would be hijacked by protesters. During the flame's progress through the city, it was followed by a group of vociferous protesters. Early in the relay, one demonstrator managed to temporarily seize the torch, and another attacked it with a fire extinguisher. Similar tactics were used by protesters the following day in Paris, who managed to force the run to be abandoned, with the torch traveling aboard support vehicles for most of its progress.

=== North America ===
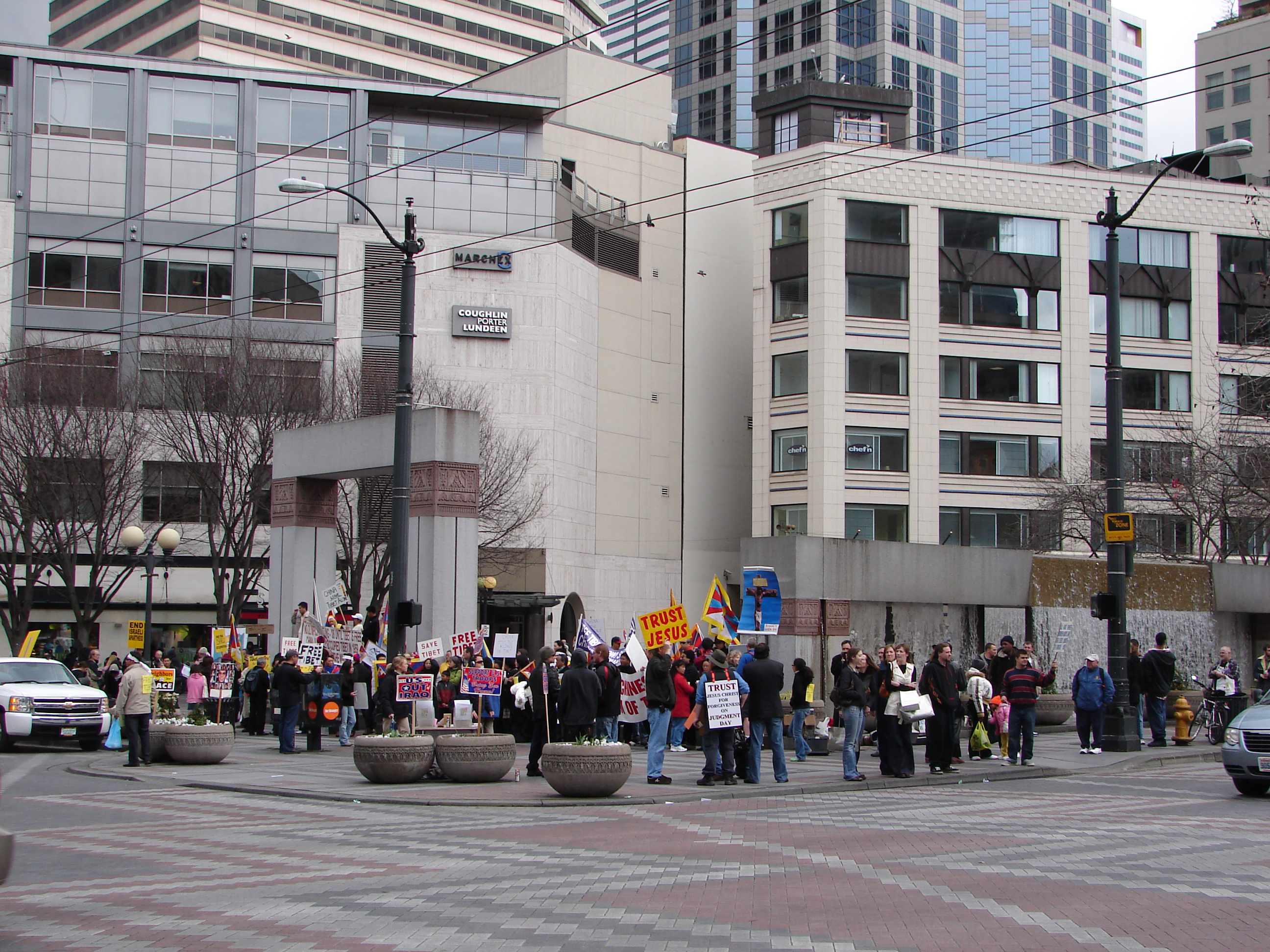
A rally against Chinese rule over Tibet in Seattle, March 15, 2008

In Canada, on Monday, March 10, 2008, several members of the Students for a Free Tibet sneaked into a neighbouring property and climbed onto the building of the Consulate General of China in Toronto, Ontario, and replaced the Chinese national flag with the Tibetan flag. Some of the protesters were later detained by the local police. The Consulate General stated that such action violated the Vienna Convention on Diplomatic Relations and the Vienna Convention on Consular Relations.

On March 11, 2008, many Tibetans protested in front of the Chinese embassy in Washington, DC. However, it turned into a riot, with one Tibetan throwing a stone at the window. It ended with two or three Tibetans arrested.

On Friday, March 14, 2008, some Tibetans protested in front of the Consulate General of China in Calgary, Alberta. Three protesters managed to enter the consulate and attempted to lower the Chinese national flag. One of them was forcefully detained by Consulate staff and was later released after a negotiation between the local police and the consulate.

On Thursday, March 20, 2008, approximately 200 - 300 protesters gathered at Parliament Hill in Ottawa, Ontario, to protest China's treatment of the Tibetan people. Canadian Prime Minister Stephen Harper and a dozen other Ministers of Parliament urged the Chinese government to show restraint in handling the situation in Tibet.

On Sunday March 23, 2008, several hundred Tibetans and supporters protested in downtown Toronto, Ontario.

In New York City, United States of America, more than 100 people staged a protest outside the United Nations Headquarters. The New York City Police Department said they arrested six pro-Tibet protesters trying to enter the building.

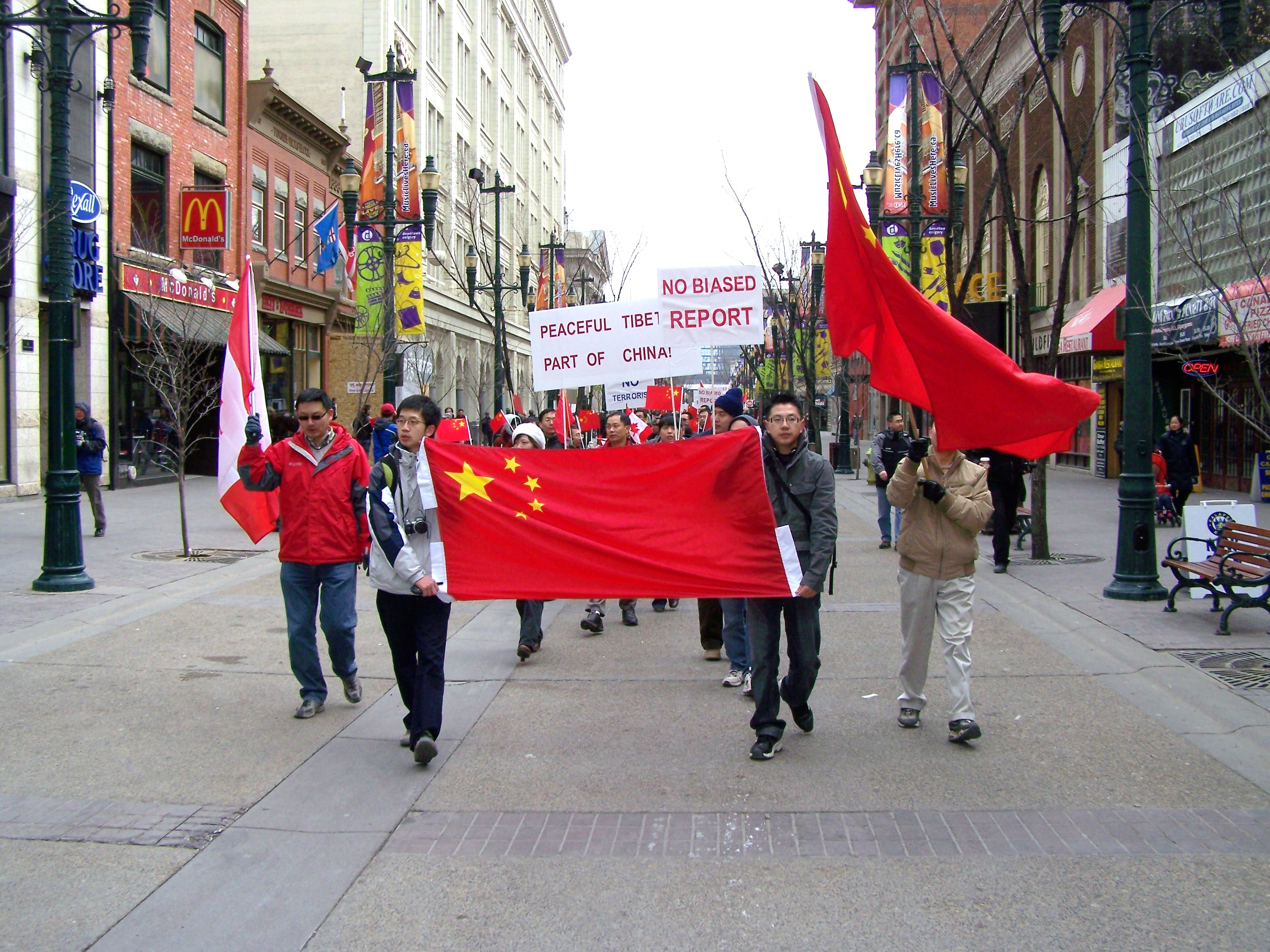
A pro-China march in Calgary, Canada, organised by overseas Chinese nationals in response to the perceived Western media bias

On March 29, hundreds to thousands of pro-China protesters in Calgary, Edmonton, Toronto, and Vancouver rallied in the downtown area to urge for calm in the situation and calling for China and Tibet to remain as "one family".

In San Francisco, California, on April 7, 2008, two days prior to the actual torch relay, three activists carrying Tibetan flags scaled the suspension cables of the Golden Gate Bridge to unfurl two banners, one saying "One World, One Dream. Free Tibet", and the other, "Free Tibet '08". Among them was San Francisco resident Laurel Sutherlin, who spoke to the local TV station KPIX-CBS5 live from a cellphone, urging the International Olympic Committee to ask China not to allow the torch to go through Tibet. The three activists and five supporters faced charges related to trespassing, conspiracy, and causing a public nuisance.

On April 13, a crowd of more than 6000 ethnic Chinese (some sources report it as more than 10,000) gathered at Parliament Hill, Ottawa, from Toronto, Ottawa, Montreal, and nearby towns for a pro-Beijing rally, during which, they sought to publicize what they called the 'truth of Tibet.' The event, which erupted in small skirmishes with pro-Tibetan protesters, featured nationalistic songs and chants, and included accusations of Western media bias in covering Tibet.

=== Oceania ===
On Saturday, March 15 in Sydney, Australia, during a chaotic clash with Tibetan protesters outside the Chinese consulate, the police used capsicum sprays and batons in an attempt to control a group of about 40 agitated Tibetan protesters. Several of the protesters entered and then exited the consulate, and thereupon, the protesters attacked a plainclothes Australian police officer. Seven protesters in total were arrested. On March 18, police again had to restrain protesters outside the Chinese consulate in Sydney.

On April 13, Chinese-Australian demonstrators took to the streets in Sydney, Australia, and protested against bias in Western media reporting in relation to the Tibetan issue and the 2008 torch relay. They also voiced their objection to Tibetan independence and their support for the 2008 Summer Olympics. The New South Wales police estimated that around 6,000 people attended the protest. News outlets in China reported about 5,000–6,000 participants. English-language media outlets in Australia downplayed the event. Major newspapers such as The Sydney Morning Herald and Daily Telegraph of the following day made no mentions of the event despite both containing articles on the Tibetan unrests, while television broadcasts reported only the Sydney protest (failing to mention the march in Melbourne) and significantly fewer participants: about 1000 according to Australian state-owned broadcaster, the ABC or only "several hundred" according to Channel Nine; Channel Nine also stated that the demonstration was concerned only about disruptions to the Olympic torch relay, rather than the primary stated target of media bias in the portrayal of the entire Tibet-related episode. On the same day, around 5000 Chinese students and Chinese-Australians participated in a similar march in Melbourne. An argument ensued between a Free Tibet supporter and pro-China protesters, but the march concluded without incident.

== See also ==
- Human rights in Tibet
