= Baishan Dam =

- Location within China
- Country: China
- Location: Huadian, Jilin Province
- Coordinates: 42°43′35″N 127°13′28″E
- Status: In use
- Construction began: 1975
- Opening date: 1984

Dam and spillways
- Type of dam: Arch gravity
- Impounds: Second Songhua River
- Height: 149.5 m (490 ft)
- Length: 677.5 m (2,223 ft)
- Dam volume: 1,663,000 m^{3} (58,728,291 ft^{3})
- Spillways: 4
- Spillway type: Service, crest overflow

Reservoir
- Creates: Baishan Reservoir
- Total capacity: 6,500,000,000 m^{3} (5,269,636 acre⋅ft)
- Catchment area: 19,000 km^{2} (7,336 sq mi)
- Surface area: 17.67 km^{2} (6.82 sq mi)

Power Station
- Commission date: Phase I: 1984; Phase II: 1992; PS: 2006
- Type: Conventional and Pumped-storage
- Hydraulic head: 110 m (361 ft) (design)
- Turbines: 5 x 300 MW (400,000 hp) Francis turbines conventional 2 x 150 MW (200,000 hp) Pumped-storage
- Installed capacity: 1,800 MW (2,400,000 hp)

The Baishan Dam (Chinese: 白山大坝, meaning: "White Mountain Dam") is an arch-gravity dam on the Second Songhua River near the town of Baishanzhen, Huadian, Jilin Province, China. The purpose of the dam is hydroelectric power generation and flood control. The dam supplies water to five turbine-generators in two different powerhouses for an installed capacity of 1,500 megawatts (2,000,000 hp) while it can also control a design 19,100-cubic-metre-per-second (670,000 cu ft/s) flood. Additionally, it has a 300-megawatt (400,000 hp) pumped-storage hydroelectric generation capacity. It is named after Baekdu Mountain (White Mountain), near the city of Baishan.

== Construction ==
Construction on the dam began in May 1975, the reservoir began to fill on September 16, 1982, and by the end of 1984, the first phase of three generators was operational. Another two generators in the project's second phase were operational by 1992. The dam submerged an area of 17.67 square kilometres (6.82 sq mi), displacing about 10,300 people.

In March 2000, a feasibility study report on a pumped-storage capability for the dam was approved. In August 2002, construction started on installing two 150 MW reversible pump generators and by July 2006, they were operational.

== Design ==
The Baishan Dam is a 149.5-metre (490 ft) tall and 677.5-metre (2,223 ft) long arch gravity dam composed of 1,663,000 cubic metres (58,700,000 cu ft) of concrete. It withholds a 6,500,000,000-cubic-metre (5,300,000 acre⋅ft) reservoir of which 3,540,000,000 cubic metres (2,870,000 acre⋅ft) is active or "useful" storage and 950,000,000 cubic metres (770,000 acre⋅ft) is flood storage. The dam's spillway contains four 12-by-13-metre (39 ft × 43 ft) openings and three 6-by-7-metre (20 ft × 23 ft) mid-level openings on its orifice. All the dam's openings can discharge a design of 19,100 cubic metres per second (670,000 cu ft/s), check standard of 26,200 cubic metres per second (930,000 cu ft/s) and maximum of 32,200 cubic metres per second (1,140,000 cu ft/s) of water.

The dam powers three separate power stations. The first station to be constructed is located underground and contains 3 x 300 MW Francis turbine generators while the second, located on the left bank slightly downstream contains 2 x 300 MW Francis turbine generators. The third portion of the dam's power station is 2 x 150 MW pump-generators. The dam's current reservoir serves as the upper and the Hongshi Dam's reservoir downstream serves as the lower.

== See also ==
- List of power stations in China
