= Huadian, Jilin =

Huadian 桦甸市
- County-level city
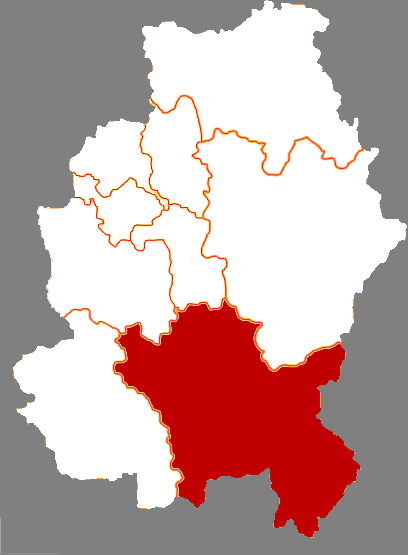
- Huadian of the city center in Jilin City

- Location in Jilin
- Coordinates: 42°58′19″N 126°44′46″E
- Country: People's Republic of China
- Province: Jilin
- Prefecture-level city: Jilin City
- Seat: Minghua Subdistrict (明桦街道)

Area
  - County-level city: 6,624 km^{2} (2,558 sq mi)
  - Urban: 192.00 km^{2} (74.13 sq mi)
- Elevation: 265 m (869 ft)

Population (2017)
  - County-level city: 464,000
  - Urban: 161,300
- Time zone: UTC+8 (China Standard)
- Postal code: 132400
- Area code(s): 0432; Division code: HDJ

Huadian (simplified Chinese: 桦甸; traditional Chinese: 樺甸; pinyin: Huàdiàn) is a city in south-central Jilin province, People's Republic of China. It is under the administration of the prefecture-level city of Jilin City.

== Administrative divisions ==
Subdistricts:

- Minghua Subdistrict (明桦街道), Yongji Subdistrict (永吉街道), Shengli Subdistrict (胜利街道), Qixin Subdistrict (启新街道), Xinhua Subdistrict (新华街道)

Towns:

- Hongshi (红石镇), Baishan (白山镇), Jiapigou (夹皮沟镇), Erdaodianzi (二道甸子镇), Badaohezi (八道河子镇), Yumuqiaozi (榆木桥子镇), Laojinchang (老金厂镇), Changshan (常山镇)

Townships:

- Gongji Township (公吉乡), Huajiao Township (桦郊乡), Jinsha Township (金沙乡), Huashulinzi Township (桦树林子乡), Huanan Township (桦南乡), Sumigou Township (苏密沟乡), Beitaizi Township (北台子乡), Hengdaohezi Township (横道河子乡)

== Climate ==
Huadian has a four-season, monsoon-influenced, humid continental climate (Köppen Dwa). Winters are long (lasting from November to March), cold, and windy, but dry, due to the influence of the Siberian anticyclone, with a January mean temperature of −17.7 °C (0.1 °F). Spring and autumn are somewhat short transitional periods, with some precipitation, but are usually dry and windy. Summers are hot and humid, with a prevailing southeasterly wind due to the East Asian monsoon; July averages 22.4 °C (72.3 °F). Snow is usually light during the winter, and annual rainfall is heavily concentrated from June to August.

Climate data for Huadian, elevation 263 m (863 ft), (1991–2020 normals, extremes 1971–2010)
Month	Jan	Feb	Mar	Apr	May	Jun	Jul	Aug	Sep	Oct	Nov	Dec	Year
Record high °C (°F)	4.9 (40.8)	13.4 (56.1)	19.0 (66.2)	30.2 (86.4)	33.6 (92.5)	35.5 (95.9)	36.3 (97.3)	33.5 (92.3)	30.7 (87.3)	29.0 (84.2)	20.4 (68.7)	9.8 (49.6)	36.3 (97.3)
Mean daily maximum °C (°F)	−8.9 (16.0)	−3.4 (25.9)	4.5 (40.1)	14.6 (58.3)	21.8 (71.2)	26.0 (78.8)	28.1 (82.6)	27.0 (80.6)	22.3 (72.1)	14.2 (57.6)	2.7 (36.9)	−6.5 (20.3)	11.9 (53.4)
Daily mean °C (°F)	−17.3 (0.9)	−11.4 (11.5)	−1.8 (28.8)	7.6 (45.7)	14.9 (58.8)	20.1 (68.2)	22.9 (73.2)	21.5 (70.7)	14.9 (58.8)	6.6 (43.9)	−3.5 (25.7)	−13.6 (7.5)	5.1 (41.1)
Mean daily minimum °C (°F)	−24.1 (−11.4)	−18.7 (−1.7)	−7.7 (18.1)	0.9 (33.6)	8.4 (47.1)	14.8 (58.6)	18.5 (65.3)	17.3 (63.1)	9.3 (48.7)	0.6 (33.1)	−8.6 (16.5)	−19.7 (−3.5)	−0.7 (30.6)
Record low °C (°F)	−44.1 (−47.4)	−40.3 (−40.5)	−31.0 (−23.8)	−12.8 (9.0)	−5.3 (22.5)	4.8 (40.6)	10.4 (50.7)	4.6 (40.3)	−3.4 (25.9)	−13.1 (8.4)	−29.2 (−20.6)	−39.1 (−38.4)	−44.1 (−47.4)
Average precipitation mm (inches)	8.0 (0.31)	13.1 (0.52)	20.6 (0.81)	38.7 (1.52)	76.7 (3.02)	123.9 (4.88)	196.4 (7.73)	170.6 (6.72)	62.1 (2.44)	40.9 (1.61)	27.5 (1.08)	16.4 (0.65)	794.9 (31.29)
Average precipitation days (≥ 0.1 mm)	7.5	6.0	7.8	9.2	13.3	14.7	15.5	14.7	10.0	9.7	8.9	8.9	126.2
Average snowy days	11.0	8.4	9.2	3.1	0	0	0	0	0	2.1	8.3	11.8	53.9
Average relative humidity (%)	70	67	62	57	62	71	80	82	78	71	71	71	70
Mean monthly sunshine hours	133.6	167.4	202.9	197.7	214.9	213.5	193.9	189.8	198.5	179.0	135.0	113.5	2,139.7
Percentage possible sunshine	46	56	55	49	47	47	42	45	54	53	47	41	49
Source 1: China Meteorological Administration
Source 2: Weather China
