= List of rivers of China =

Rivers that flow through China are as follows. The list is organized according to the body of water into which each river empties, beginning with the Sea of Okhotsk in the northeast, moving clockwise on a map and ending with the Arctic Ocean.

== Sea of Okhotsk ==
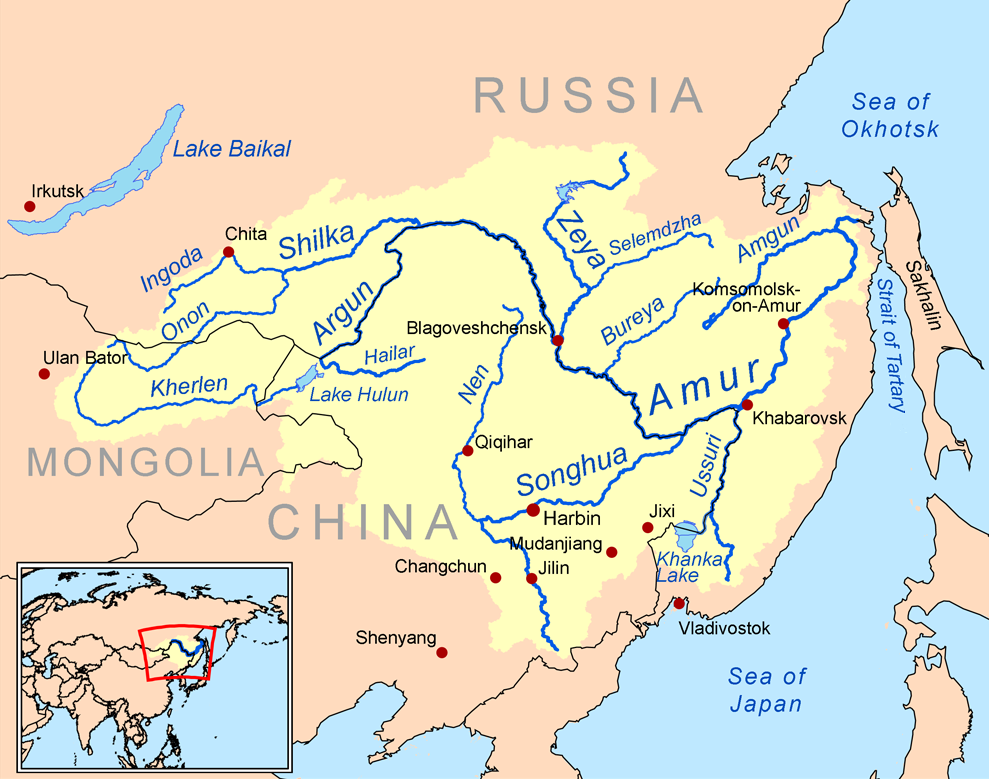
Amur River basin

- Heilong River (黑龙江) (Amur River)
  - Ussuri River (乌苏里江)
    - Muling River (穆棱河)
    - Songacha River (松阿察河)
  - Songhua River (松花江)
    - Ashi River (阿什河)
    - Hulan River (呼兰河)
    - Second Songhua River (第二松花江)
    - Woken River (倭肯河)
    - Mudan River (牡丹江)
    - Nen River (嫩江)
      - Gan River (Inner Mongolia) (甘河)
    - Huifa River (辉发河)
  - Argun (额尔古纳河)
    - Hailar River (海拉尔河)
    - Hulun Lake (呼伦湖)
      - Kherlen River (克鲁伦河)
      - Buir Lake (贝尔湖) (mostly in Mongolia)

== Sea of Japan ==
- Suifen River (绥芬河) / Razdolnaya River (Russia)
- Tumen River (图们江)
  - Hunchun River (珲春河)

== Bohai Sea ==
- Anzi River (鞍子河)
- Fuzhou River (复州河)
- Daliao River (大辽河)

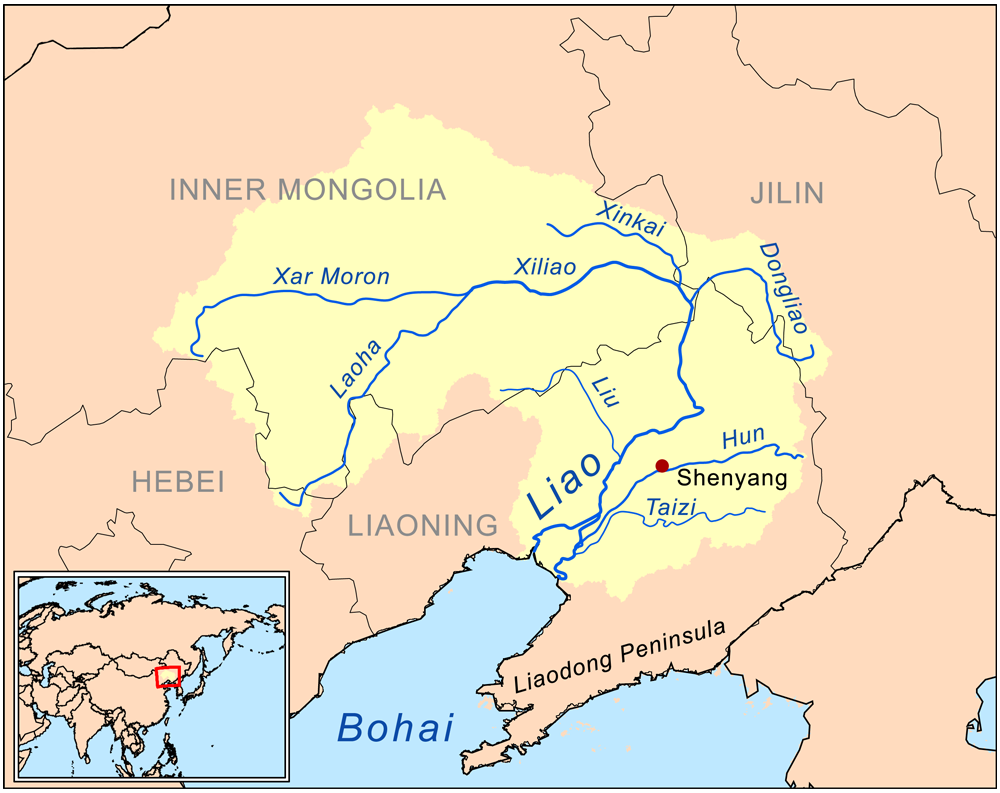
Liao River Basin

- Liao River (辽河)
  - Taizi River (太子河)
  - Hun River (浑河)
  - Liu River (柳河)
  - Dongliao River (东辽河)
  - Xiliao River (西辽河)
    - Xar Moron River (西拉木伦河)
- Daling River (大凌河)
- Yantai River (烟台河)
- Liugu River (六股河)
- Shi River (石河)
- Gou River (狗河)
- Dashi River (大石河)
- Jiujiang River (九江河)
- Dai River (戴河)
- Yang River (洋河)
- Luan River (滦河)
- Hai River (海河)
  - Chaobai River (潮白河)
    - Chao River
    - Bai River

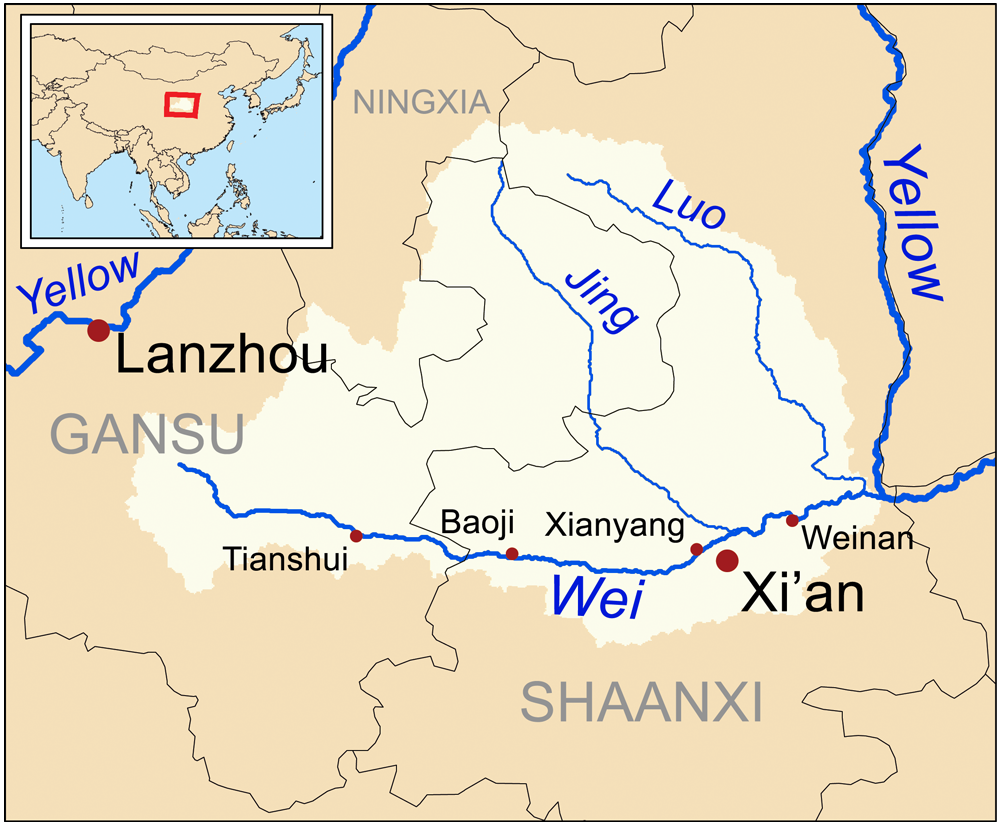
Wei River Basin

  - Wei River (Shandong) (潍河)
  - Zhang River (漳河)
  - Yongding River (永定河)
    - Sanggan River (桑干河)
    - Yang River (洋河)
  - Daqing River (大清河)
    - Juma River (拒马河)
  - Wei River (Hebei) (卫河)
- Tuhai River (徒駭河)

Yellow River Basin

- Yellow River (Huang He) (黃河)
  - Yufu River (玉符河)
  - Beidasha River (北大沙河)
  - Nandasha River (南大沙河)
  - Dawen River (大汶河)
    - Liuchang River (柳长河 or 流长河)
    - Yuejin River (跃进河)
    - Hui River (汇河)
      - Jinxian River (金线河)
      - Kangwang River (康王河)
    - Wu River (五河)
    - Beiquan River (北泉河)
    - Cao River (漕河)
    - Miaojia River (苗家河)
    - Chaiwen River (柴汶河)
      - Yucun River (禹村河)
      - Guangming River (光明河)
      - Yangliu River (羊流河)
      - Xizhou River (西周河)
      - Pingyang River (平阳河)
      - Weishui River (渭水河)
    - Panwen River (泮汶河)
    - Zhitian River (芝田河)
    - Tao River (陶河)
    - Yingwen River (瀛汶河)
      - Shiwen River (石汶河)
    - Fangxia River (方下河)
    - Lianhua River (莲花河)
    - Lixin River (里辛河)
  - Jindi River (金堤河)
    - Huangzhuang River (黄庄河)
  - Luo River (Henan) (洛河 (南))
  - Yi River (伊河)
  - Qin River (沁河)
  - Wei River (渭河)
    - Jing River (泾河)
    - Luo River (Shaanxi) (洛河 (北))
  - Fen River (汾河)
  - Yan River (延河)
  - Wuding River (无定河/無定河)
  - Kuye River (窟野河)
  - Dahei River (大黑河)
  - Qingshui River (清水河)
  - Zuli River (祖厉河/祖厲河)
  - Tao River (洮河)
  - Daxia River (大夏河)
  - Huangshui River (湟水河)
  - White River (白河)
- Xiaoqing River (小清河, formerly known as 济河)
  - Zihe River (淄河)
  - (Xin)Tahe River
    - Yanghe River (阳河)
  - Zhangseng River
    - Mihe River

== Yellow Sea ==
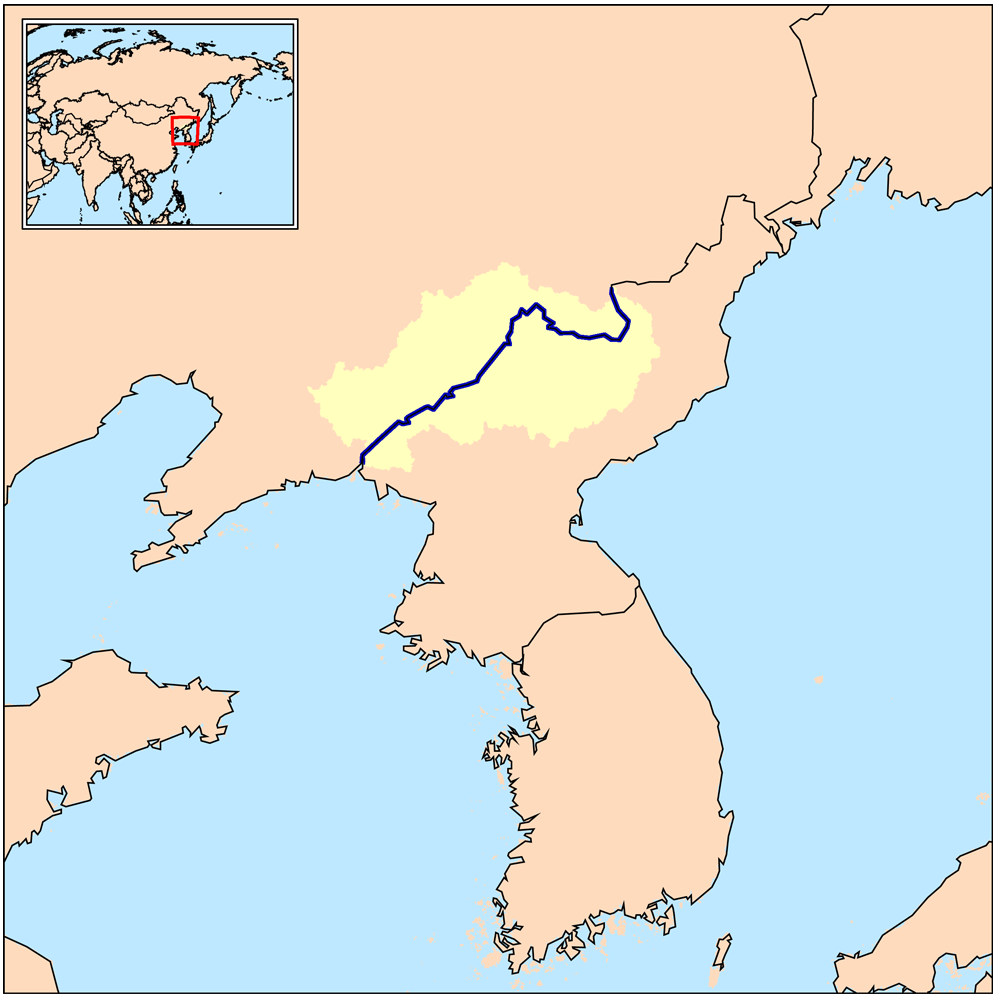
Yalu River

- Yalu (鸭绿江) - Korea Bay
- Dayang River (大洋河) - Korea Bay
- Huli River (湖里河) - Korea Bay
- Yingna River (英那河) - Korea Bay
- Zhuang River (庄河) - Korea Bay
- Xiaosi River (小寺河) - Korea Bay
- Jiao (胶河)
- Yishui River (沂河)
  - Shu River (沭河)
  - Si River (泗河)

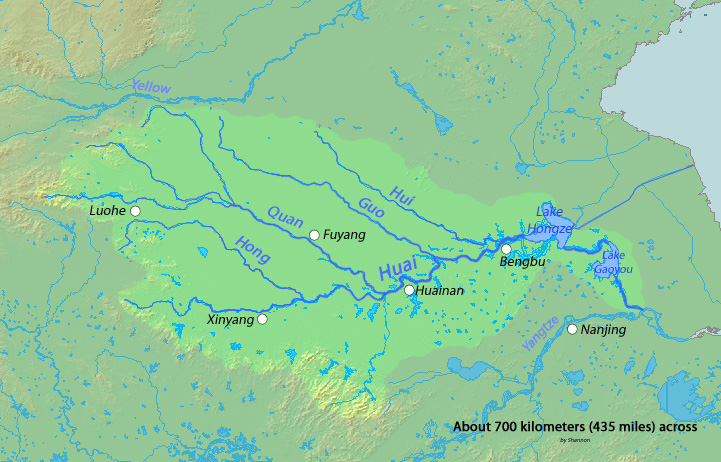
Huai River basin

- Northern Jiangsu Irrigation Channel
  - Hongze Lake (洪泽湖)
    - Huai River (淮河)
      - Hui River (浍河)
      - Guo River (涡河)
      - Ying River (颍河) - also known as Shaying River (沙颖)
      - Xiaorun River (小润河)
      - Gu River (谷河)
      - Shiguan River (史灌河)
        - Guan River (灌河)
        - Hong River (洪河)
      - Huang River (潢河)
      - Lü River (闾河)
      - Ming River (明河)
      - You River (游河)
      - Yue River, Shaanxi

== East China Sea ==
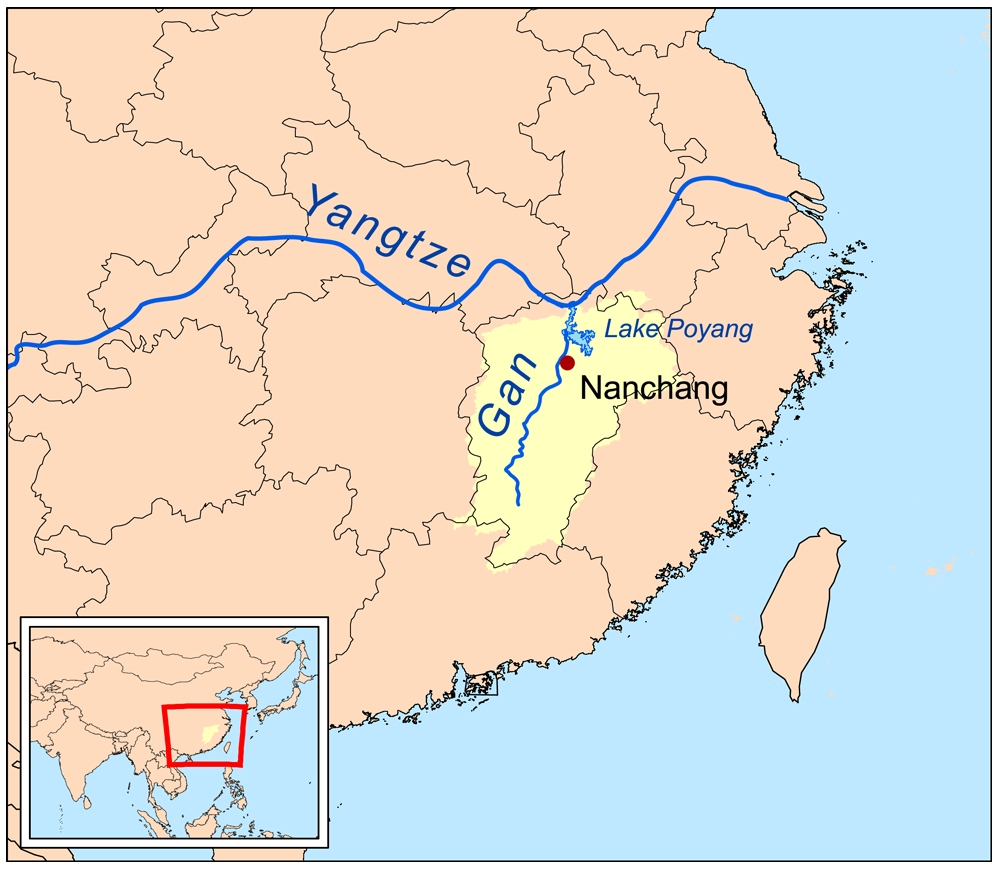
Gan River and Poyang Lake of Jiangxi

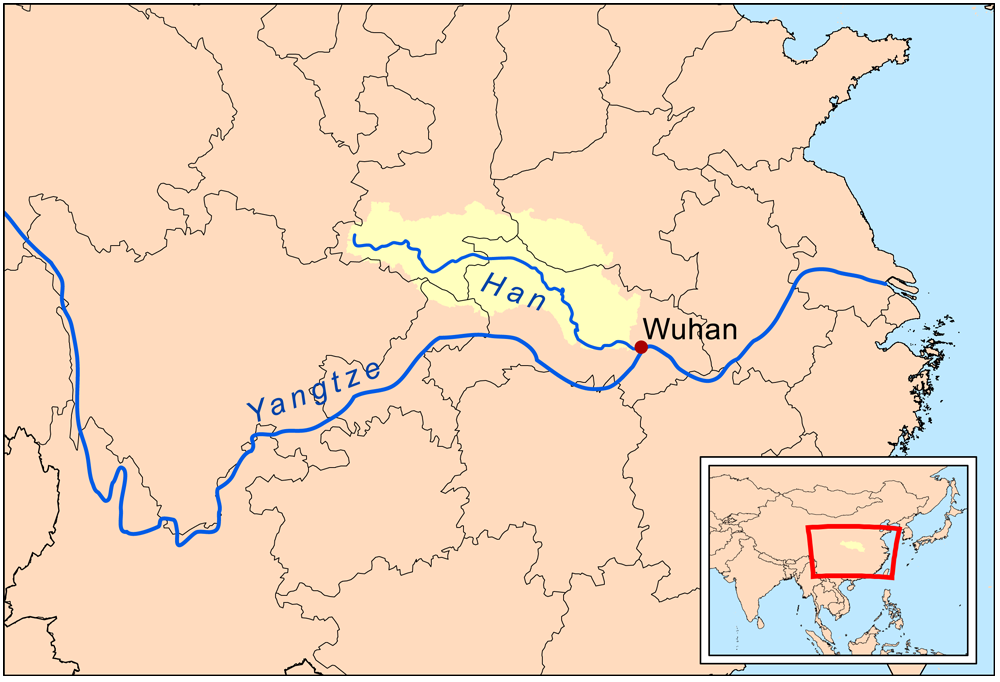
Han River Basin of Hubei, southern Shaanxi and southwestern Henan

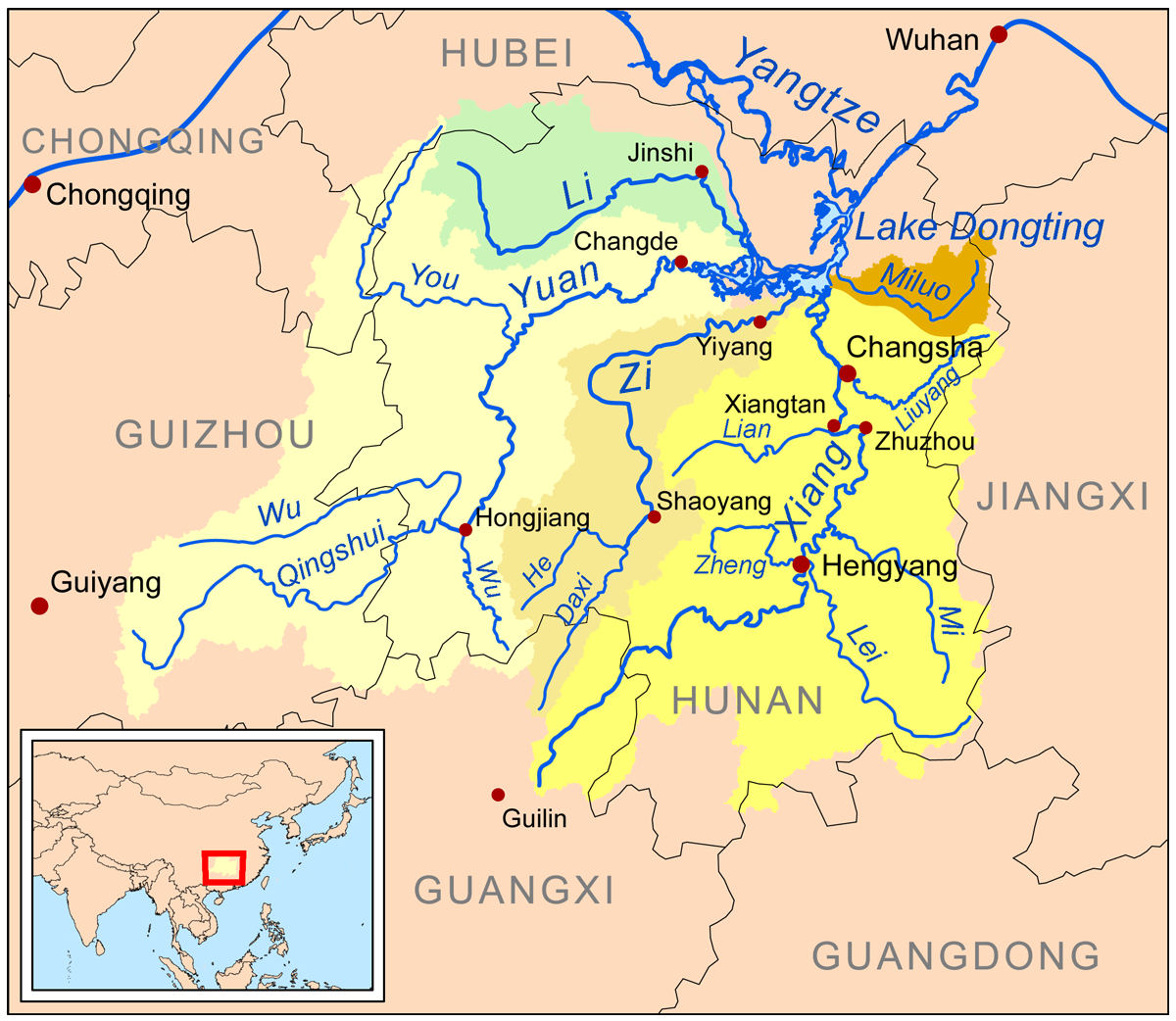
Lake Dongting and the Lishui, Yuan, Zi, Xiang and Miluo Rivers of Hunan.

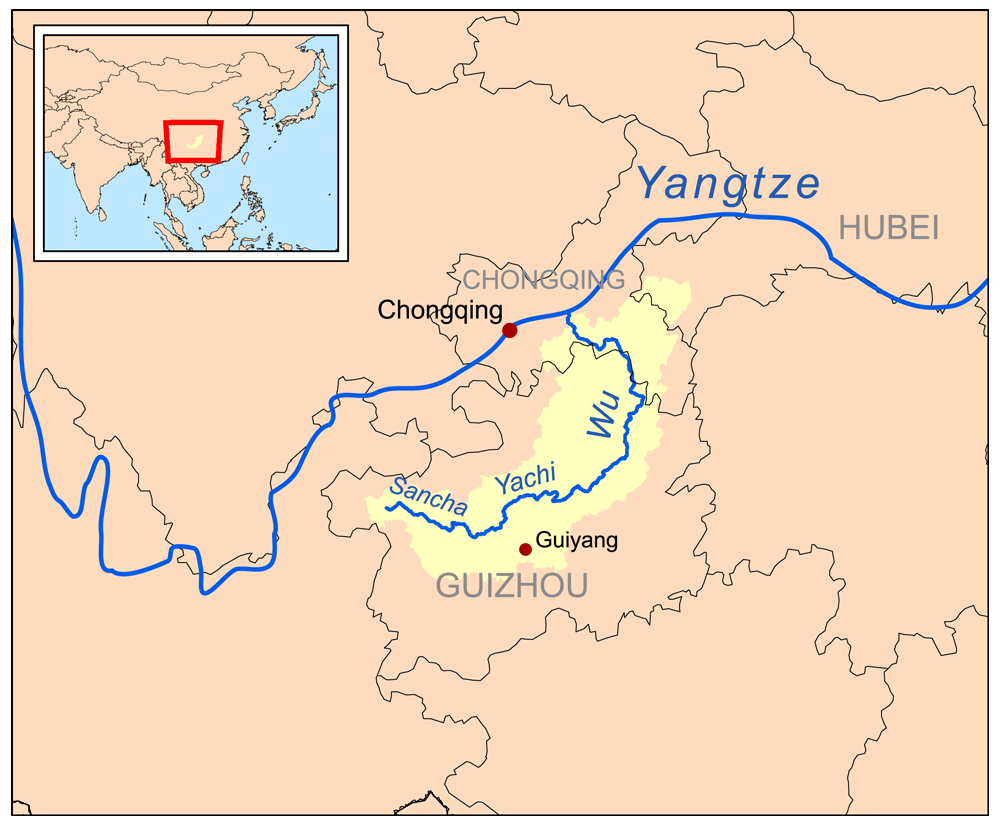
Wu River of Guizhou

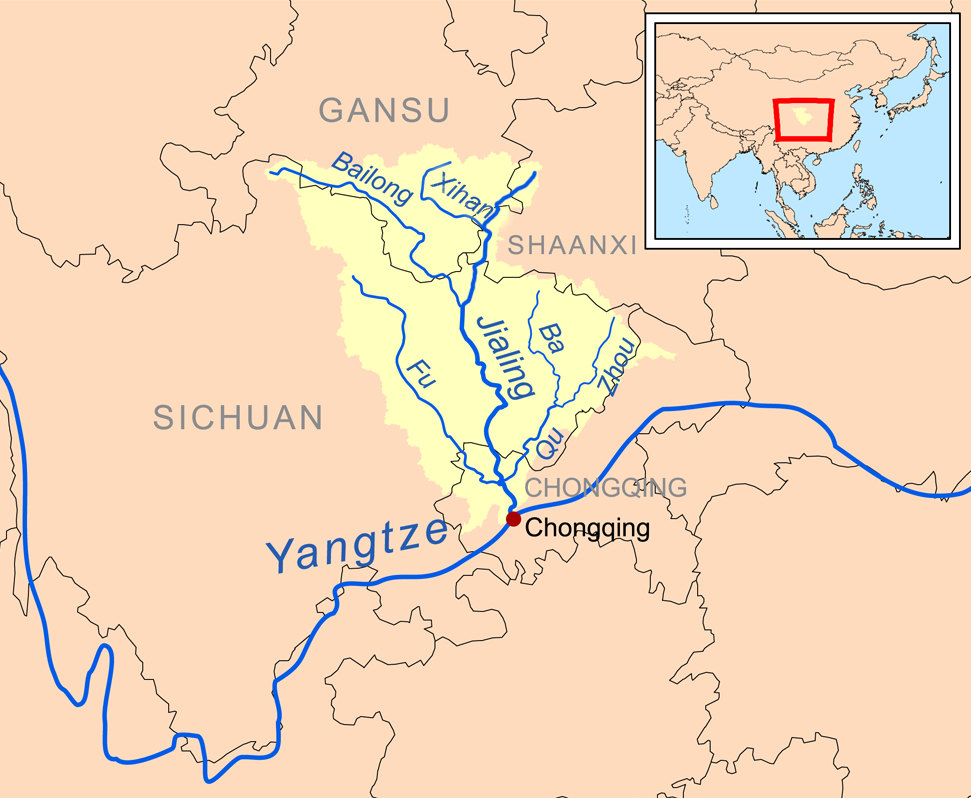
Jialing River Basin of Chongqing, eastern Sichuan and southern Gansu

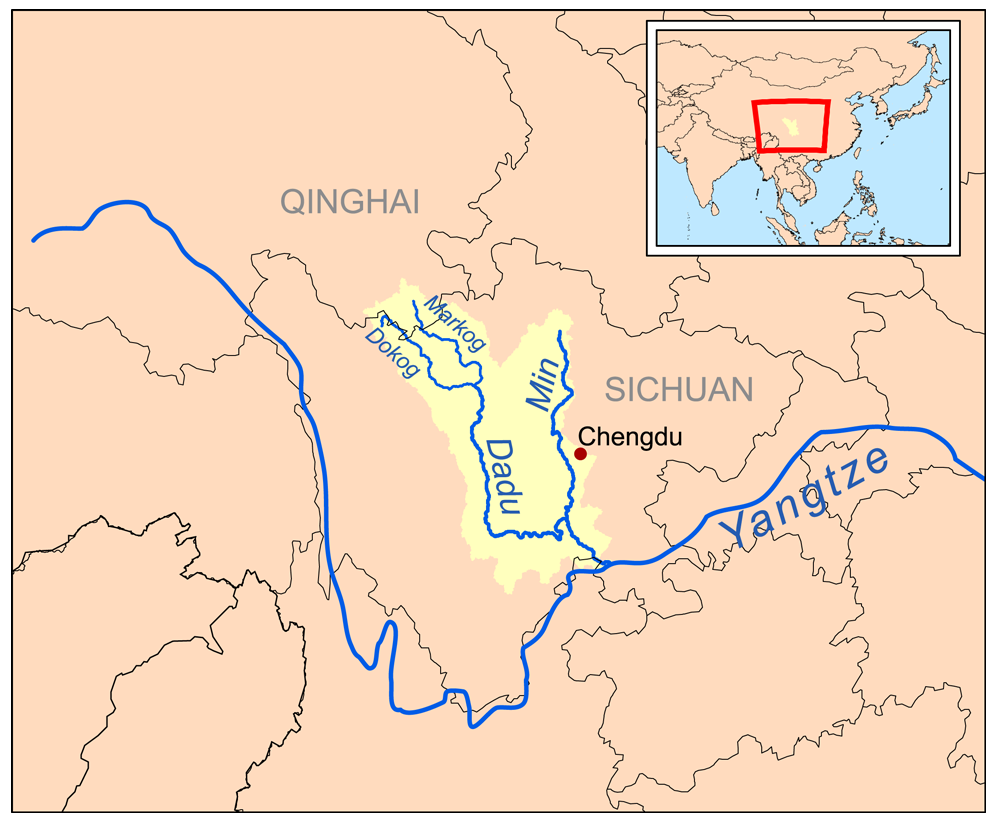
Min River of central Sichuan

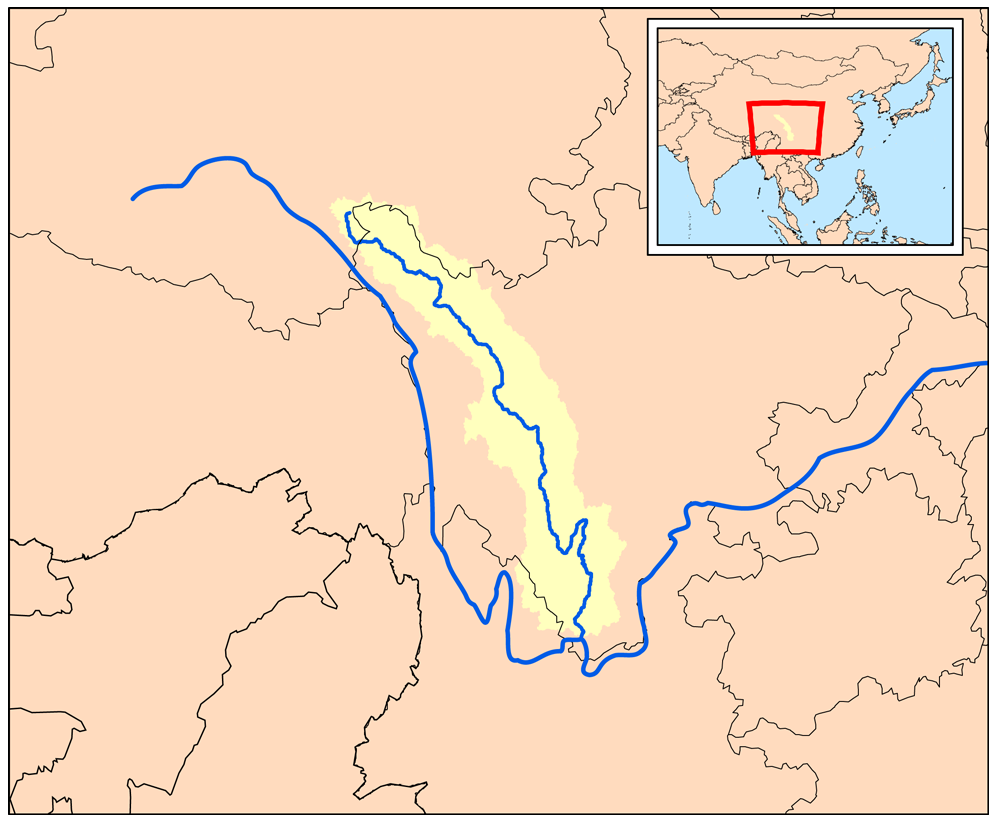
Yalong River of western Sichuan and southern Qinghai

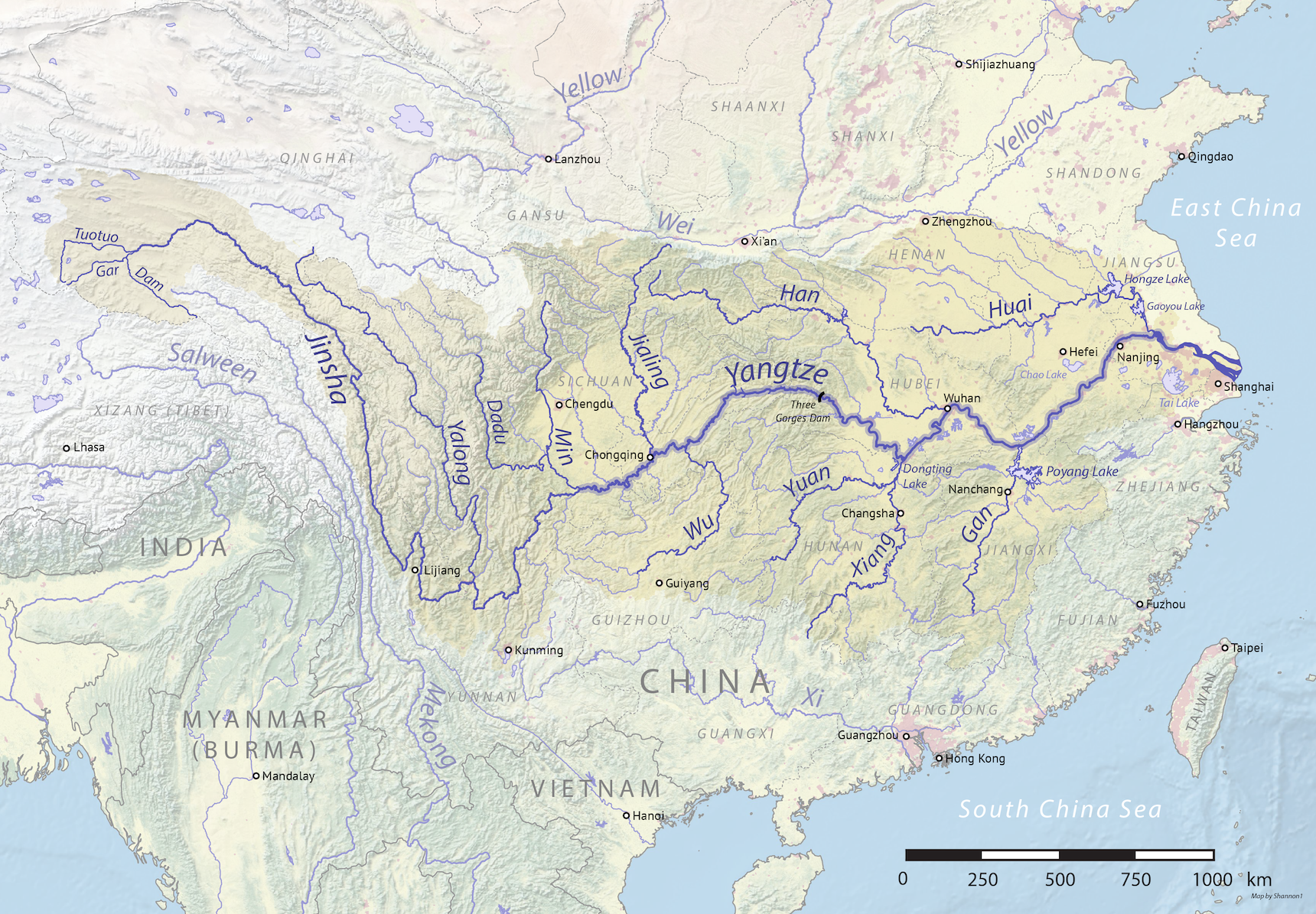
Yangtze River basin

- Yangtze River (Chang Jiang 长江; upper reach known as Jinsha Jiang 金沙江 and Tongtian River 通天河) (For detailed list see List of tributaries of the Yangtze.)
  - Huangpu River (黃浦江)
    - Suzhou Creek or Wusong River (苏州河, 吴淞江)
  - Xitiao River (西苕溪)
    - Daxi Creek
  - Grand Canal (大运河)
  - Qinhuai River
    - Gaoyou Lake (高邮湖)
      - Sanhe River (三河)
        - Hongze Lake
          - Huai River
  - Guxi River (姑溪河)
    - Shijiu Lake (石臼湖)
  - Yuxi River (裕溪河)
    - Lake Chao
    - Nanfei River (南淝河)
  - Qingyi River (青弋江)
    - Jingshan River (荆山河)
    - Daoni River (倒逆河)
    - Zhaxi River (渣溪河)
    - Machuan River (麻川河)
    - Taiping Lake (太平湖)
      - Sanxikou River (三溪口)
      - Qingxi River (清溪河)
      - Shuxi River (舒溪河)
  - Poyang Lake
    - Gan River (Jiangxi) (赣江)
      - Zhang River (Jiangxi) (章水)
      - Gong River (贡水)
        - Mei (梅河)
        - Xiang (湘水)
    - Fuhe (抚河)
    - Xin River (信江)
  - Fushui River (富水河)
  - She River (滠水)
  - Han River (Yangtze River tributary) (汉江)
    - Chi River (Han River) (池水)
    - Muma River (牧马河)
    - Du River
  - Lake Dongting
    - Miluo River (汨罗江)
    - Xiang River (湘江)
      - Xiao River (潇水)
      - Zheng River (氶水)
    - Zijiang River (Zi) (资江)
    - Yuanjiang River (Yuan) (沅江)
    - Lishui River (Li) (澧水)
      - Loushui River (溇水)
  - Qing River (清江)
  - Huangbo River (黄柏河)
  - Shennong Stream (神农溪)
  - Daning River (Chongqing) (大宁河)
  - Modao Creek (磨刀溪)
  - Jialing River (嘉陵江)
    - Fu River (Sichuan) (涪江)
    - Qu River (Jialing River tributary) (渠江)
    - Baishui River (白水)
    - Bailong River (白龙江)
    - Liuchong River (Jialing)
  - Longxi River (龙溪河)
  - Huaxi River (花溪河)
  - Qi River (綦江)
  - Sunxi River (笋溪河)
  - Wu River (Yangtze River tributary) (乌江)
    - Sancha River
    - Liuchong River
    - Qingshuihe River
  - Tuo River (沱江)
  - Chishui River (Southwest China) (赤水河)
  - Min River (Sichuan) (岷江)
    - Dadu River (Sichuan) (大渡河)
      - Qingyi River (Sichuan) (青衣江)
      - Nanya River
    - Caopo River (草坡河)
  - Yalong River (雅砻江)
    - Muli River
  - Pudu River
  - Dadan River (達旦河)
  - Shuoduogang River (硕多岗河)
- Qiantang River (钱塘江) / Xin'an River (新安江)
  - Heng River (横江)
    - Longchuan River (龙川)
    - Fengxi River (丰溪河)
- Cao'e River (曹娥江)
- Yong River (甬江)
- Jiao River (椒江)
- Ou River (Zhejiang) (瓯江)
- Mulan River (木蘭溪畔)
  - Xikou River
  - Dajixi River
- Ao River (敖江)

== Taiwan Strait ==
- Minjiang River (Fujian) (闽江)
- Long River (Fujian) (龙江)
- Quanzhou Bay:
  - Luo River (Fujian) (洛江)
  - Jin River (Fujian) (晋江)
- Jiulong River (九龙江)

== South China Sea ==
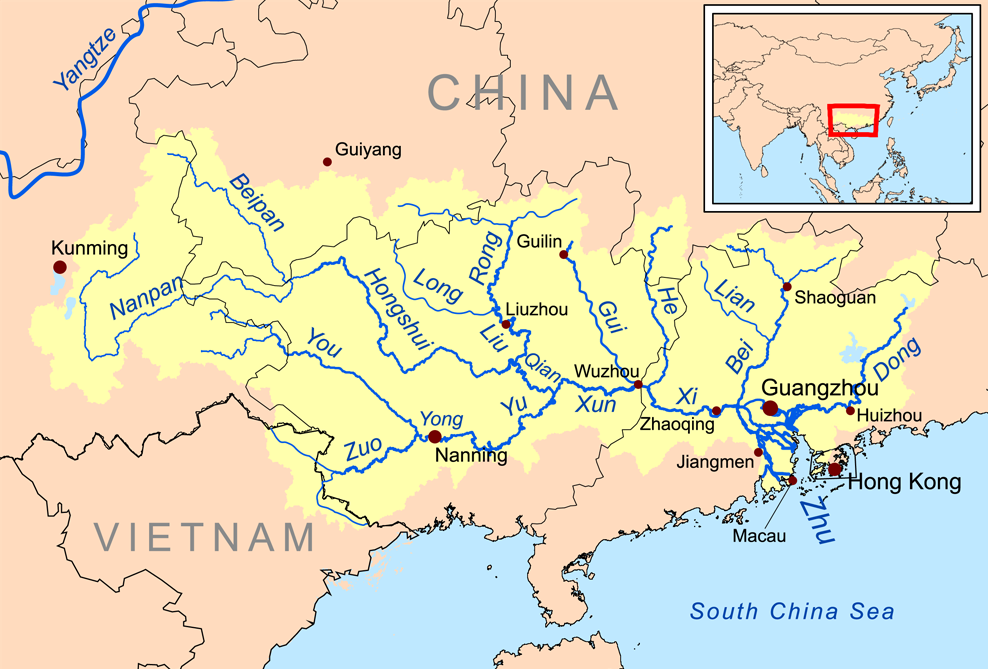
Pearl River Basin

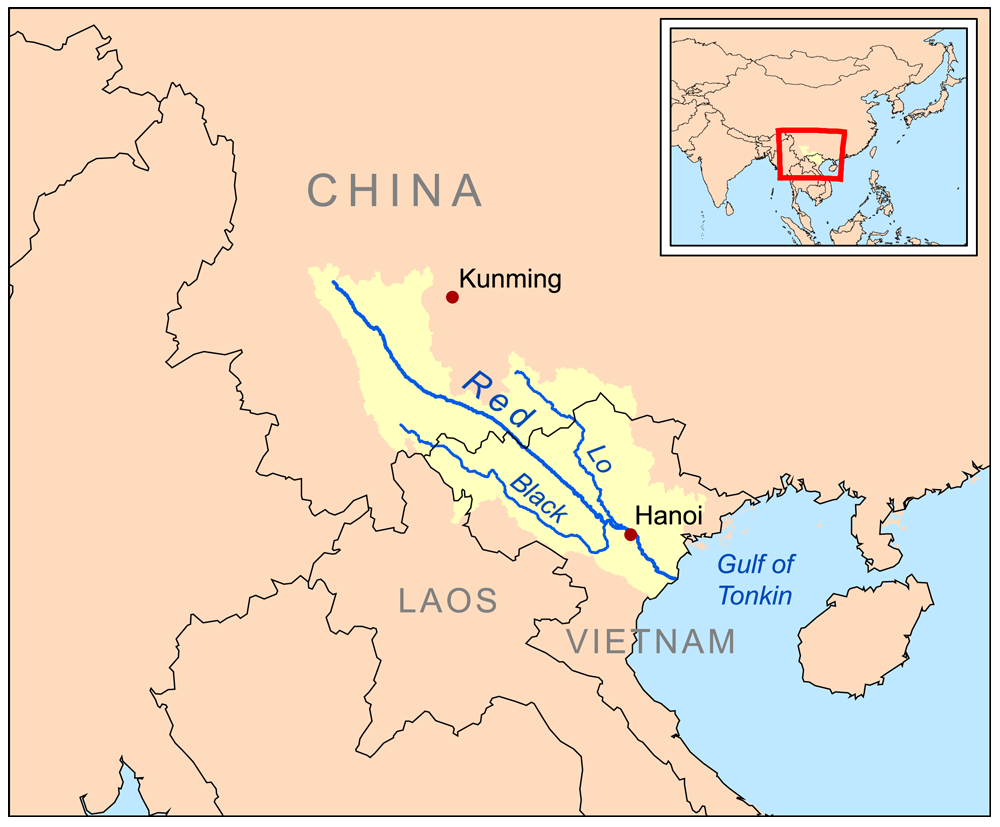
Red River (Asia) watershed

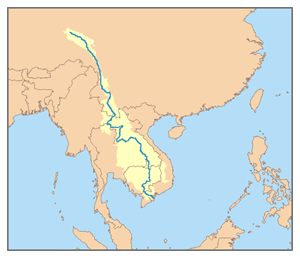
Lancang (Mekong) River watershed

- Han River (Guangdong) (韩江)
  - Mei River (梅江)
    - Ning River (宁江)
  - Ting River (汀江)
  - Dajing River (大靖河)
- Pearl River (Zhu Jiang) (珠江)
  - Dongjiang River (Dong) (东江)
  - Liuxihe River
  - Beijiang River (Bei) (北江)
  - Xinfeng River
  - Xijiang River (Xi) (西江)
    - Gui River (Gui) (桂江)
      - Lijiang River (Li) (漓江)
    - Xunjiang (Xun) (浔江)
      - Qian River (黔江)
        - Liu River (柳江)
          - Rong River (融江
          - Long River (Guangxi)龙江)
        - Hongshui River (Red River) (红水河)
          - Beipan River (北盘江)
          - Nanpanjiang River (南盘江)
            - Qu River (曲江)
              - Lian River (Qu River) (练江)
      - Yujiang River (Yu) (鬱江)
        - Yongjiang (Yong) (邕江)
          - Zuojiang River (Zuo) (左江)
          - Youjiang River (You) (右江)
- Beilun River (北仑河)
- Yuan River (元江) / (Red River)
  - Nanwen River (南温河) / Lô River
  - Lixian River (李仙江) / (Black River)
- Three Parallel Rivers of Yunnan Protected Areas
  - Lancang River (澜沧江) (Mekong)
- Nanju River (南桔河)
- Nanla River (南腊河)
- Luosuo River (罗梭江)

=== From Hainan Island ===
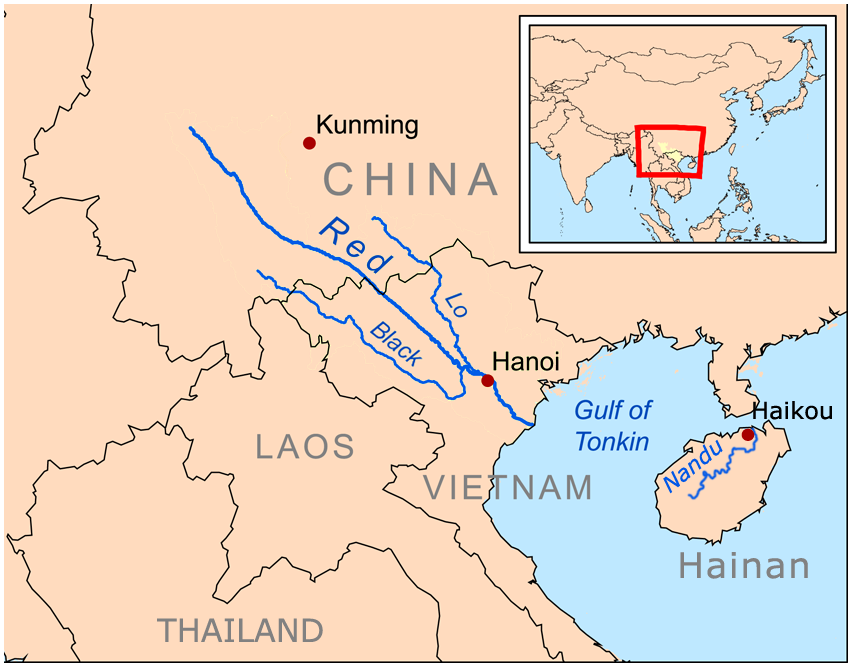
Nandu River (map), Hainan Province

- Nandu River (南渡江)
  - Haidian River
- Wanquan River (万泉河)

== Andaman Sea ==
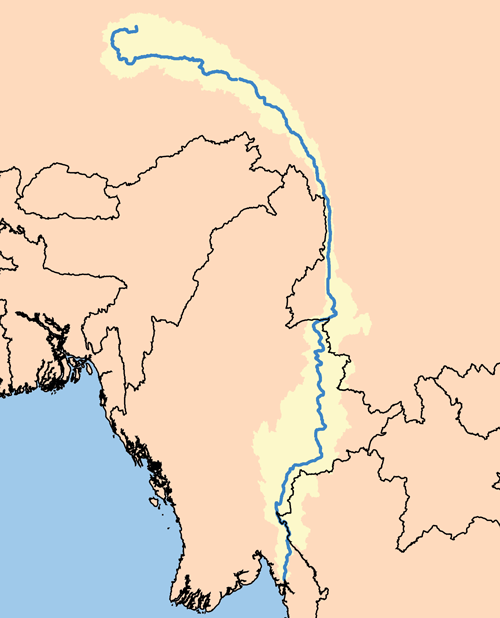
Nu (Salween) River

- Nu River (怒江) / (Salween River)
  - Wanma River (万马河)
  - Hongyang River (硔养河)
  - Mengboluo River (勐波罗河)
  - Supa River (苏帕河)
  - Shidian River (施甸河)
  - Luomingba River (罗明坝河)
- Irrawaddy River (Myanmar)
  - Daying River (大盈江) / (Taping River)
  - Longchuan River (龙川江) / (Shweli River)
  - N'Mai River (Myanmar)
    - Dulong River (独龙江)

== Bay of Bengal ==
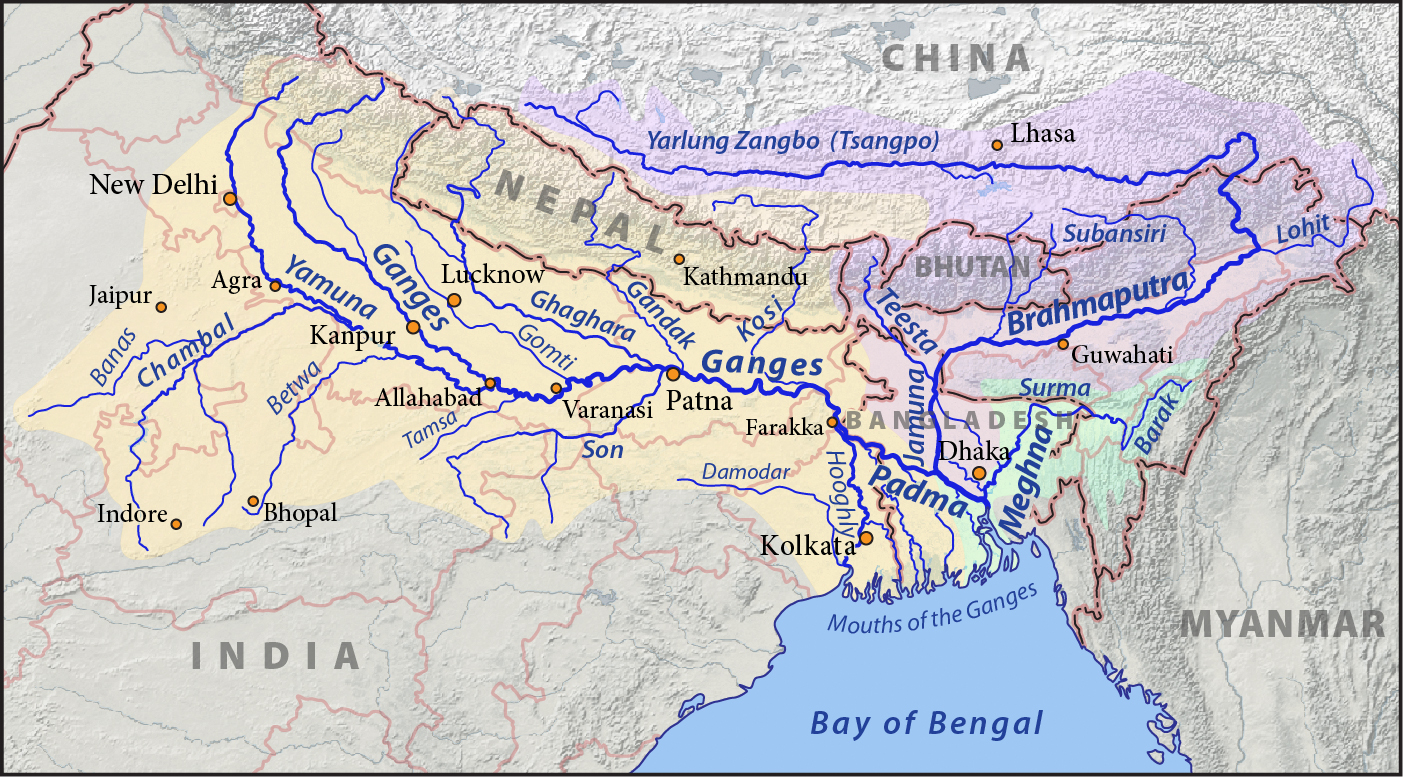
Map of the Ganges (yellow), Brahmaputra (violet), and Meghna (green) drainage basins.

- Ganges River (India) / Padma River (Bangladesh)
  - Meghna River (Bangladesh)
  - Yarlung Tsangpo River ( ཡར་ཀླུངས་གཙང་པོ་, 雅鲁藏布江)
    - Subansiri River (西巴霞曲)
    - Lhasa River
    - Parlung Tsangpo (帕隆藏布)
    - Yigong Tsangpo (易贡藏布)
    - Zayuqu (察隅曲) / Lohit River
    - Nyang River ( ཉང་ཆུ, 尼洋曲)
    - Manas River (Bhutan / India)
    - Lhobrak Chhu / Kuri Chhu
  - Kosi River (Nepal / India)
    - Bum Chu (བུམ་ཆུ, 澎曲 / 阿龙河) / Arun River
    - Matsang Tsangpo (མ་གཙང་གཙང་པོ།, 麻章藏布) / Bhotekoshi River
    - Rongshar Tsangpo (波特科西) / Tamakoshi River
  - Ghaghara River (格尔纳利河)

== Arabian Sea ==
- Sênggê Zangbo (སེང་གེ།་གཙང་པོ, 狮泉河) / Indus River
  - Panjnad River (Pakistan)
    - Langqên Zangbo (གླང་ཆེན་གཙང་པོ, 象泉河) / Sutlej River

== Arctic Ocean ==
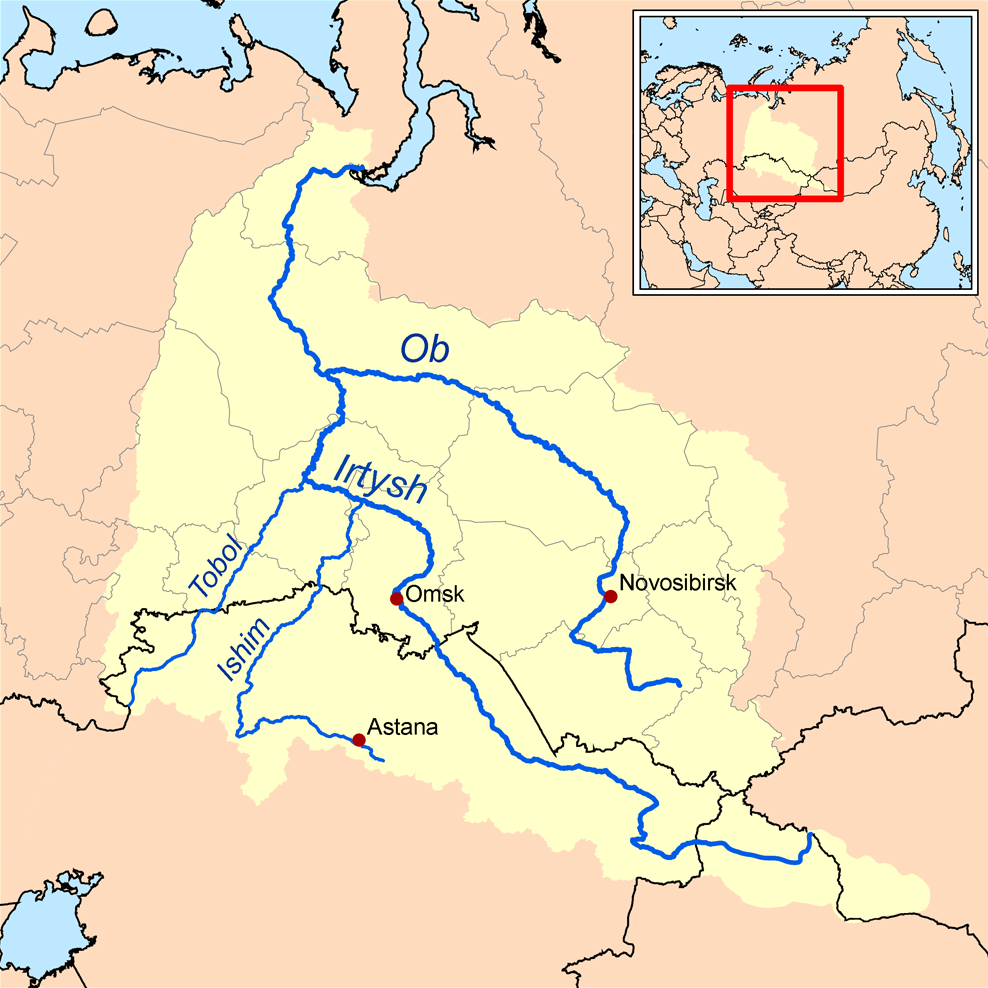
Ob-Irtysh watershed

- Ob River (Russia)
  - Irtysh (额尔齐斯河)
    - Bieliezeke River (别列则克河)
    - Haba River (哈巴河)
    - Burqin River (布尔津河)
      - Kanas River (喀纳斯河)
        - Kanas Lake (喀纳斯湖)
      - Hemu River (禾木河)
    - Kala Irtysh River (喀拉额尔齐斯河)

== Endorheic basins ==
=== Dzungarian Basin ===
- Ulungur Lake (乌伦古湖)
  - Ulungur River (乌伦古河)
- Manas Lake (玛纳斯湖)
  - Manas River (玛纳斯河)
- Ailik Lake (艾里克湖)
  - Baiyang River (白杨河)

=== Ili Basin ===
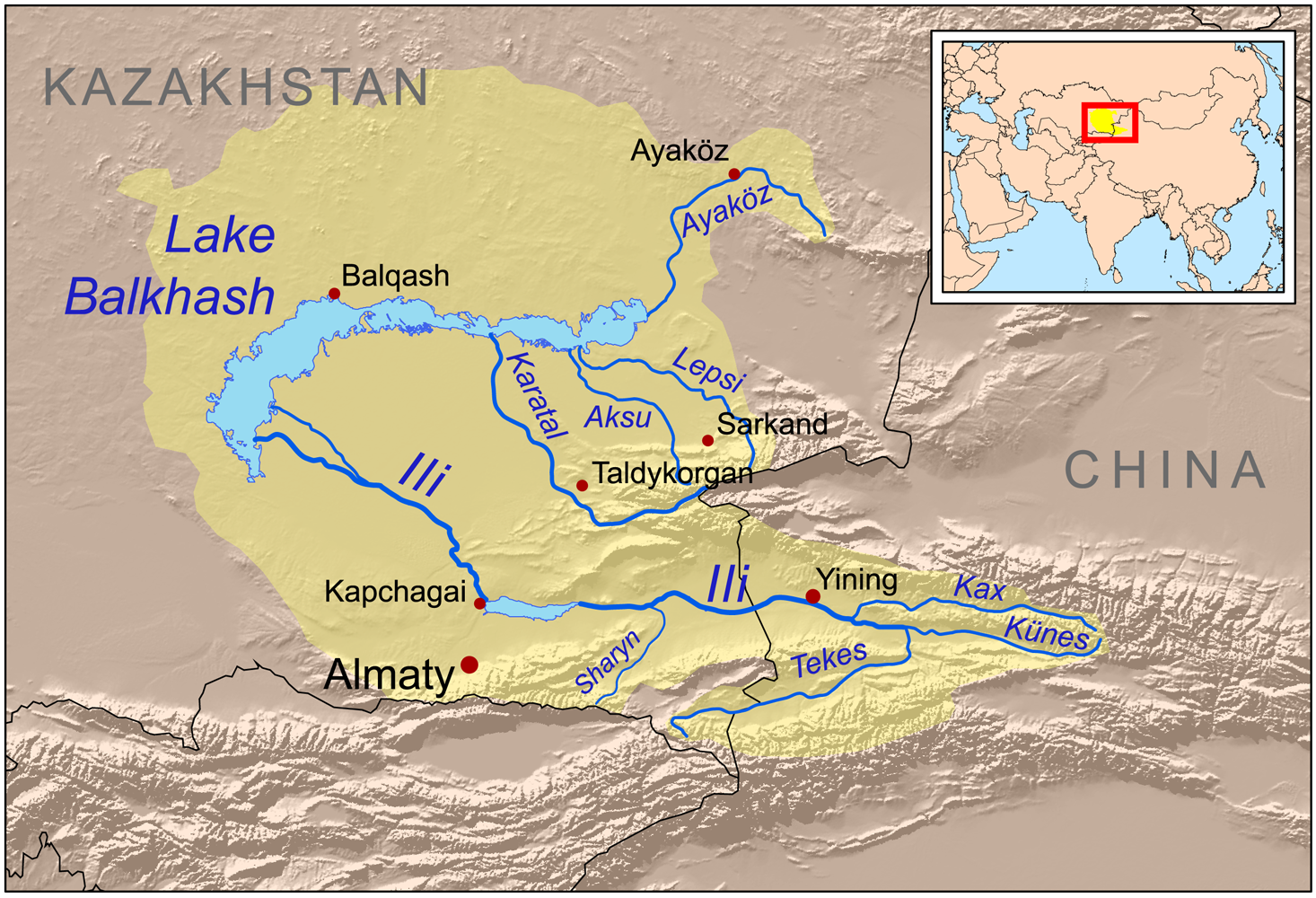
Ili Basin

- Lake Balkhash (Kazakhstan)
  - Ili river (伊犁河)
    - Kax River (喀什河; also known as the Kash River)
    - Tekes River (特克斯河)

=== Juyan Lake Basin ===
- Ejin River
- Dang River
- Beida River
- Taolai River

=== Lake Alakol ===
- Lake Alakol (Kazakhstan)
  - Emil (Emin) River (额敏河)
- Lake Zhalanashkol (Kazakhstan)
  - Terekty (Tielieketi) River (铁列克提河)

=== Qaidam Basin ===
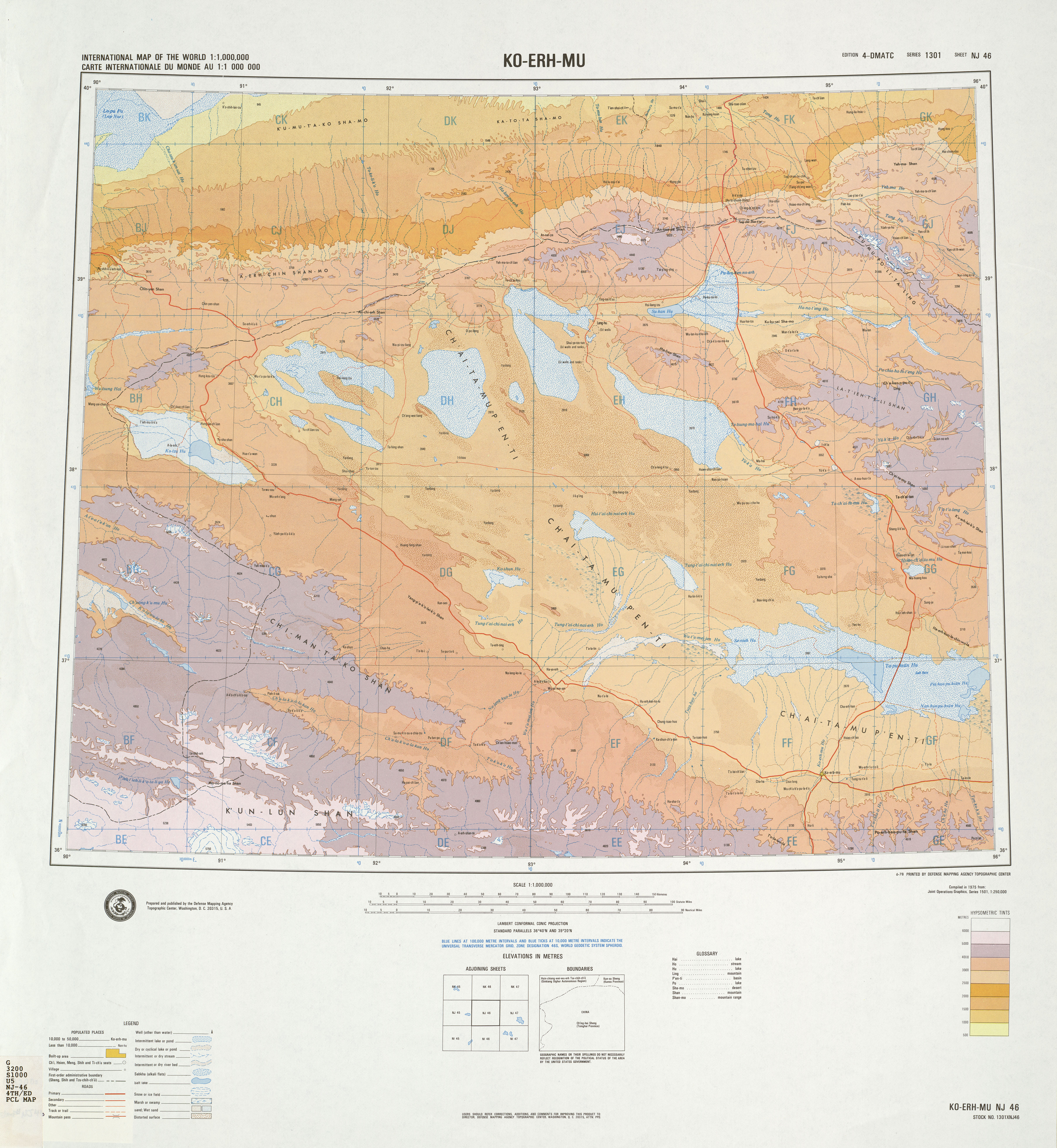
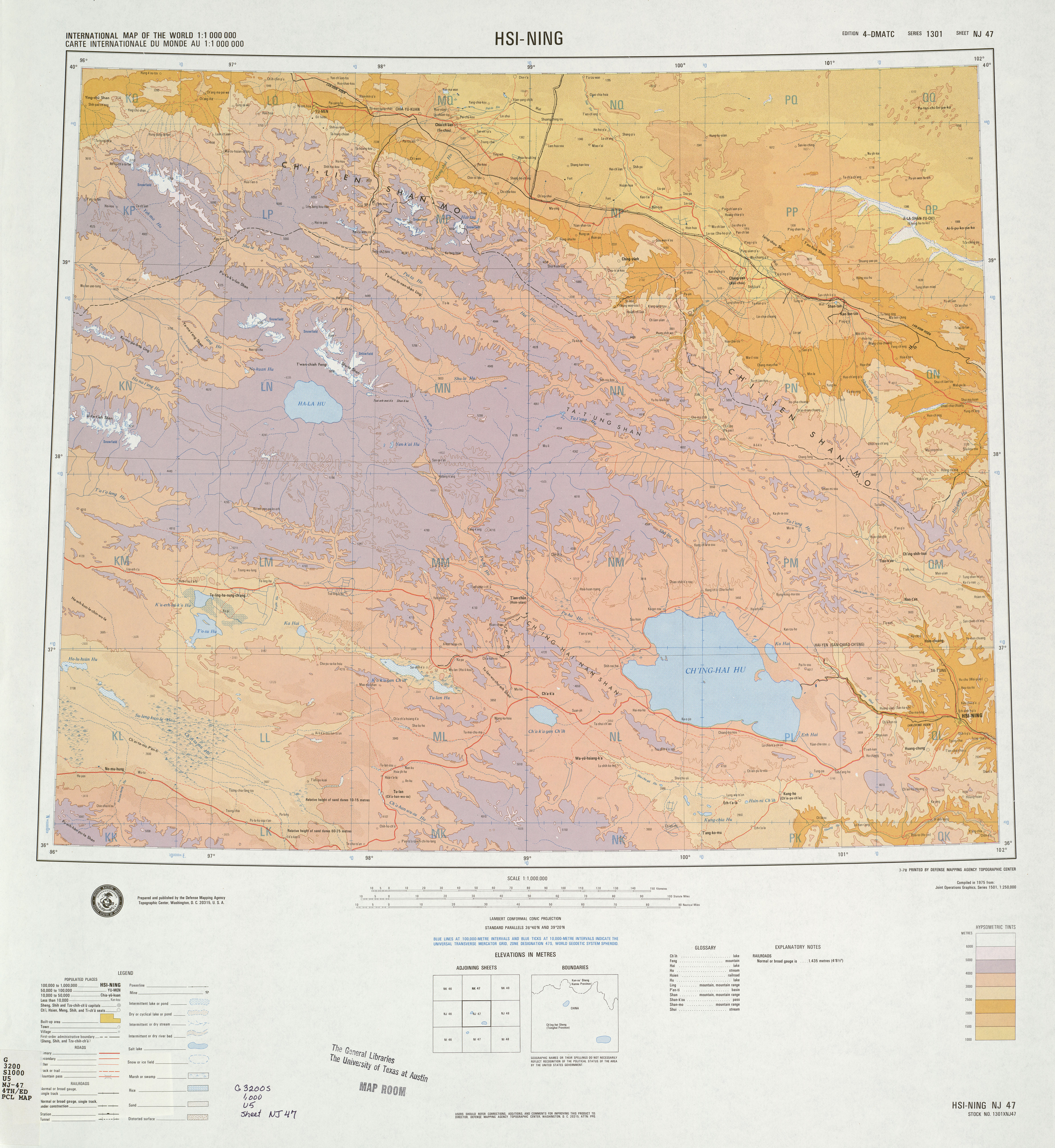
Detailed US Army maps of Qaidam, c. 1975. (Names given in Wade-Giles romanization.)
- Golmud River (格尔木河)

=== Tarim Basin ===
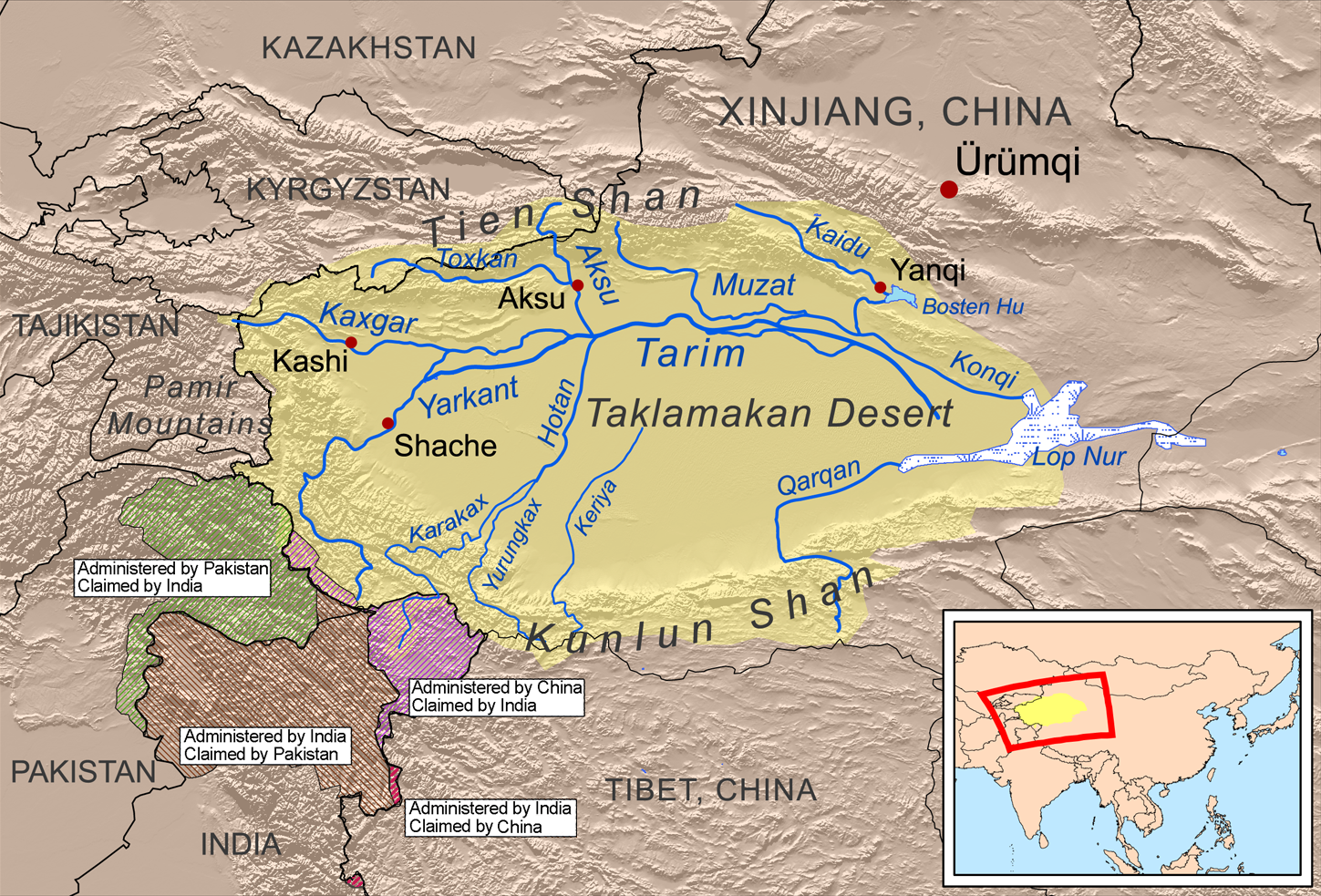
Tarim Basin

- Qiemo River (且末河)
- Kaidu River (开都河)
- Tarim River (塔里木河) - ends in the Lop Lake
  - Muzat River (木扎尔特河)
  - Khotan River (和田河)
    - Karakash (Black Jade River) (黑玉江)
    - Yurungkash (White Jade River) (白玉江)
  - Aksu River (阿克苏河)
    - Toshkan River (托什干河)
  - Yarkand River (叶尔羌河)
    - Kashgar River (喀什河)
    - Tashkurgan River (塔什库尔干河)
    - Shaksgam River (沙克思干河)
- Shule River (疏勒河)
  - Dang River
  - Lucao River
    - Yulin River
  - Changma River
- Karatash River (库山河)

== Canals ==
- Eastern Zhejiang Canal (浙东运河), connecting the Qiantang, Cao'e, and Yong watersheds
- Grand Canal of China (京杭大运河), connecting the Qiantang, Yangtze, Huai, Yellow R., and Hai watersheds
- South–North Water Transfer Project, various canals repurposed to move vast amounts of water to the north
- Lingqu Canal (灵渠), connecting the Yangtze and Pearl watersheds
- Irtysh–Karamay–Ürümqi Canal, providing irrigation to the grasslands and deserts of Xinjiang

== See also ==
- List of longest rivers of China
- List of rivers of Asia
- List of waterways in China
- Lakes in China
- Geography of China
