= List of tributaries of the Yangtze =

The Yangtze has a number of direct tributaries. This page lists such tributaries by size, from the estuary upwards in the order of their inflows. Tributaries with a drainage area greater than 1,000 km^{2} and a flow rate greater than 10 m^{3}/s are included.

Left tributary	Right tributary	Length (km)	Basin size (km^{2})	Average discharge (m^{3}/s)^{*}
Yangtze (with Huai)		6,418	1,970,000	31,900
Yangtze Delta
	Huangpu	114	26,251.3	365.8
	Xiheng		1,105.5	12.8
Luting			2,523.1	24.3
Huai		1,252	172,079.4	1,317
Chu		269	7,829.9	79.5
Lower Yangtze
	Qinhuai	110	2,631	29.2
	Guxi (Shuiyang)	254	10,740.7	236.4
	Qingyi	275	7,910.5	303.8
Yuxi		68	12,475.8	164.3
	Huanghu		717.7	16.6
Tianhe			686.2	11.6
Fengsha			552.8	12.9
Qingtong			1,272.6	39.1
	Jiahuahe		503.3	16.4
	Qiupu	150	2,788	101.7
Luochang			789.9	17.6
Chang			3,654.2	79.9
	Huangpen		1,502	46.3
Wan		227	5,638.5	136.8
Dipaigou			800.7	21.6
	Yaodu		736.1	22.7
Huayang			4,993.7	138.9
	Dongsheng (Dong)		660.4	19.5
	Jiangjiatao		530.8	16.2
Middle Yangtze
	Kan Kiang–Poyang Lake–Gan	991	162,424.3	5,981.1
	Changhe		1,293.6	42.2
	Nanyang (Gankou)		336.9	10.6
	Fushui	196	5,258.1	143.3
Qishui			2,148	54
	Baishawan		1,146.2	28.1
Xishui		157	2,604.5	59.8
Ba			3,318.9	71.4
	Yuehe		3,232.2	71.7
Jushui		170.4	4,367.6	87
Daoshui			2,188.3	38
She		112	2,312	36.8
Huan Shui			1,591.1	23.4
Han		1,577	165,306.1	1,640.3
Tongshue			2,204.4	40.2
Dongjing			5,276.2	81.5
Neijing			4,124.7	75.4
	Ganhe		1,373.5	32
	Tingsi		843.8	19.1
	Lushui (Liu)		3,843.4	95
	Ya Pengkouhe		1,189.5	26.5
	Dongting Lake	14	260,551.3	6,374.1
Juzhang		341.5	7,284	86.4
Manao			661.1	10.4
	Qing	423	16,696.7	467
Upper Yangtze
Huangbo (Huangbai)			1,948.5	32.4
	Jiuwan Brook		580.6	13.4
Xiang			3,211.9	52.3
	Qinggang		784.9	19.8
Shennong			1,057.1	21.8
Daning		202	4,202.1	84.5
	Daxi		1,629.2	37.2
Meixi		112.8	1,895	40.1
	Shilu		1,334.6	30.1
	Mondao		3,058.7	68.3
Tangxi			1,716.4	37.8
Xiao		183	5,225	127
Ruxi			742.1	17
Ganjing			923.6	21
	Long		2,770.2	62.1
Quxi			1,004.7	21.9
	Wu	1,150	86,798.7	1,697.5
	Lixiang		923.7	19.7
	Taohua		872.1	18.6
Yulin		218.2	3,861	78.7
Jialing		1,129	159,180.3	2,367.5
	Qi (Furong)	231	7,100.6	169
Binan			1,051	20
	Tang		1,216.5	23.8
Shengshui			739.8	13.8
	Chishui	523	18,873.2	335.1
Tuo		655	27,866	519
	Yongning	156	3,265.8	91
	Changning		2,025.1	36.2
Huangsha			879.3	15.4
	Nanguang		4,767.8	79.2
Min		735	135,295.6	2,850
Jinsha
	Heng	305	15,016	199
Xining			1,049.4	18.9
Xisu (Xiaohe)		45	707	11.9
Liutong (Meigu)		145	3,248	59.1
	Niulan	461	13,107	181.8
Xixi		155	2,891	55
Heishui		173	3,750	68.5
	Yili	121	2,600.5	39
	Xiao (Mashu)	141	3,049	37.7
Laowang-shan Danian			787.4	12.5
	Pudu	294	11,685.7	174.8
Sanyu			1,376.7	23.6
Pulong			2,351.2	39.7
	Mengguo		1,727.8	22.1
	Longchuan	260	9,287.1	124.1
Yalong		1,323	128,444	1,914
	Renhe Gou		699	10.7
Xinzhuang (Cha)		95	1,441	22.8
	Wanma		1,075.1	17.1
Maguo			1,355.5	25.8
	Yupao	193	4,033.5	61.8
	Naxi (Dadan)	102.4	1,888	31.4
	Luotou		1,003.8	17.3
	Yanggong		1,672.6	32.3
Wulang			2,080.4	40.1
Shiluo (Daoceng)		299	13,856.8	193.1
Chongjiang			2,556.3	40.2
	Yongligou		1,008.2	17.8
Zhen Lanhe			938.1	16.4
Xugongqing			851.3	16.2
Zhiboluo (Zhubalong)			1,870	36.4
Wengshui			2,506.4	29.9
Songmai		226	12,213	116.5
	Zhongyan		2,594.5	16.5
Moqu Qu			1,537.1	11.2
	Dala		2,764.4	18
Quge			3,262.3	26.2
Jiang			1,139.8	9.8
	Requ		5,474.9	50.3
	Cangqu		4,644.9	54.1
Ququ			2,886.3	27.3
Zeng			5,474.7	50.2
Dingqu			1,315.4	14.7
Sequ			1,637.7	22.1
Tongtian
	Zhaqu (Batang)	92.3	2,485	28.8
	Yequ		2,563.5	13
Xiqie			1,630.5	8.3
De Qu			4,250.6	23.6
	Dengailong	75	2,269.6	10.2
	Ningqia		5,724.4	34.8
Sewu		156	6,272	18.9
Chumaer (Oumar)		527	21,482.7	29.3
	Kouquian Qu		3,538.5	18.2
Beilu (Lemqqu)			7,960.3	12.6
	Zhonggaqu		3,006.3	9.9
	Monqu Qu		8,644.1	27.4
Ri Achiqu			2,430.1	4.1
Tuotuo		358	16,691	75.1
	Dam (Dangqu)	360	31,254	196.2

^{*}Period: 1971–2000
