= List of longest rivers of China =

Rivers in China

China has 228 rivers with drainage basins larger than 10,000 square kilometres, with a combined length of 132,500 kilometres. Their annual runoff ranks 6th in the world. Three of the world's ten longest rivers flow through China.

Rivers in China can originate in three main regions: Southeast of the Tibetan Plateau, from where the longest rivers emerge; the corridor between the Da Hinggan Range, Hebei and Shanxi mountains, the Western Henan mountains, and the Yunnan–Guizhou Plateau, where rivers typically have smaller flow rates; and the corridor between the Changbai Mountain, Shandong hills, and the southeastern coastal ranges. Rivers that originate in the latter generally have shorter and smaller drainage basins than the former two, but carry abundant water.

Most rivers in China are exorheic, flowing into the Pacific Ocean, the Indian Ocean, and the Arctic Ocean. Rivers flowing into the Pacific Ocean cover 56.7% of China's total land area. The area of Greater Khingan–Yin Mountains–Helan Mountains–Eastern Qilian Mountains–Bayan Har Mountains–Gangdise Shan divides China's endorheic and exorheic regions. Rivers west of the area are mostly endorheic. While rivers in the country cover one-third of the land area, they contain less than 5% of the total water.

There are seven drainage systems in China, listed from north to south: Songhua River, Liao River, Hai River, Yellow River, Huai River, Yangtze, and Pearl River. Together, these systems cover most of the country's rivers.

This list includes rivers flowing through China with main stems at least 1,000 km long. Transboundary rivers whose length within China is shorter than 1,000 km are not included. (Note: These include Irtysh (4248 km), Sengge Zangbo (2900 km), Ganges (2510 km，disputing), Irrawaddy River (2288 km), Ili River (1236 km), and Red River (1006 km))

== Rivers ==
The list number is based on the Encyclopedia of Rivers and Lakes in China. Numbers vary between sources due to differences in the definition of a river's source or the methods used to measure its length. The list will note figures from other sources if they differ by more than 10%.

In this list, only river length, drainage areas, and discharge within China are counted. The number of rivers outside China, i.e. transboundary rivers, is given in parentheses.

indicated that parts of the river crossed Chinese boundaries (i.e. transboundary river).

| # | Name (Note: Some transboundary rivers changed their names after crossing Chinese boundaries. This list retains their Chinese name while linking to their English entry.) | Length of main stem (km) | Flowing area (km2) | Flowing regions in China (Note: Grouped by Provinces of China. Countries through which the transboundary rivers flow are given in parentheses.) | Annual flow rate (100 million m3) | Flow into | Coordinate of its river mouth | Picture | Citations |
|---|---|---|---|---|---|---|---|---|---|
| 1 | Yangtze (Note: Various sections of the Yangtze have local names, including Ulan Moron, Tongtian River, and Jinsha River. In some sense, the Yangtze started from the confluence of the Jinsha River and the Min River. In this list, the Yangtze started from Yangtze River source and ends in Yangtze Estuary. See Yangtze#Etymology for details.) | 6300+ (Note: No firm length for the Yangtze since its origin is in debate.。) | 1800000 | Qinghai, Sichuan, Tibet, Yunnan, Chongqing, Hubei, Hunan, Jiangxi, Anhui, Jiangsu, Shanghai | 9150 | East China Sea | 31.5°N 122.0°E | | |
| 2 | Yellow River | 5464 | 813400 (Note: Including Ordos of 46500 km and Sazhubxi River of 8300 km.。) | Qinghai, Sichuan, Gansu, Ningxia, Inner Mongolia, Shaanxi, Shanxi, Henan, Shandong | 580 (Note: This is the natural runoff. The measured flow rate decreased to 53.48 billion m³ between 1956 and 2000 with the development of modern society.。) | Bohai Sea | 37.8°N 119.2°E | | |
| 3 | Heilong River | 3414 (4416) (Note: There are two origins of the Amur. The number of 3414 is based on its southern origin, which started from the Hailar River (622km)-Argun River (898 km). The northern origin of the Onon and the Ingoda on the Yablonoi Mountains form the Shilka (560 km) after a flow about 500 km. The length of the Heilong River will be 4,344 km if the origin is based on the northern one. After the Shilka and the Erguna converge near Engh Had, the river is known as the “narrowly defined” main stem of the Heilong River. The middle reach within China (from Engh Had Village to the mouth of the Ussuri) is 1,894 km long. Encyclopaedia Britannica defines the Heilong as 2824 km as "in narrow sense". The length will be 3884 km based on the Encyclopaedia Britannica sense.) | 900000 （1840000） | (Russia, Mongolia,) Inner Mongolia, Heilongjiang | 2785 （3550） | Strait of Tartary | 52.9°N 141.1°E | | |
| 4 | Tarim River | 2572 (Note: Based on the origin of Yarkand River (1269 km). The Yarkand, the Aksu, and the Hotan formed the Tarim at 肖夹克. It is around 1303 km long.。) | 236300 （258600） (Note: Based on "Four origins and one flow" (四源一幹). "Four origins" refers to the Yarkand, the Aksu, the Hotan, and the Kaidu River-Konqi River; while the "one flow" refers to the Tarim. Historically, the Tarim encompassed all 144 rivers that flowed into Lop Nur. Most rivers originating from the southern Tian Shan and the Kunlun Mountains in southern Xinjiang belonged to the Tarim system. Some sources therefore described its drainage basin as 1,020,000 km2. In the 20th century, the lower reaches of the Tarim ran dry, and Lop Nur also completely dried up.) | Xinjiang | 49 (Note: This is the average water volume from the three natural sources flowing into the Tarim River. The Konqi River conveys water downstream through the artificially constructed Kuta Main Canal and East Main Canal, with an average annual transfer volume of 480 million cubic meters. Beginning in the 1980s, a 320km stretch of the river below the Daxihaizi Reservoir once ran dry. In the early 21st century, China implemented a series of water management measures, and the dried-up lower reaches of the Tarim River resumed flowing.) | Taitema Lake | 39.5°N 88.3°E | | |
| 5 | Songhua River | 2309 (Note: The total length of the Nen River is 1370 km, while the Second Songhua River is 958 km. The main river of the Songhua formed when the Nen River and the Second Songhua met at 三岔河镇. The main river's length is 939 km. This list defines the Nen River as the origin after considering river chiefs, watershed area, and runoff volume factors. In coastal folk tradition, the Second Songhua River and the main stream of the Songhua River are commonly referred to collectively as the Songhua River.。) | 556800 | Inner Mongolia, Heilongjiang, Jilin | 783.97 | Heilong River | 47.7°N 132.5°E | | |
| 6 | Pearl River | 2214 | 442100 （453700） | Yunnan, Guizhou, Guangxi, Guangdong | 3264 | South China Sea | 22.4°N 113.7°E | | |
| 7 | Lancang River | 2161 （4878） | 164400 （814000） | Tibet, Yunnan, (Myanmar, Laos, Thailand, Cambodia, Vietnam) | 743 （4481） | South China Sea | 10.2°N 106.8°E | | |
| 8 | Yarlung Tsangpo | 2057 （2840 (Note: 3,848 km from some other sources。)） | 242000 （935000 (Note: 712,035 km from some other sources。)） | Tibet, (India, Bangladesh) | 1649（6179） | Ganges | 23.8°N 89.8°E | | |
| 9 | Nu River | 2013 (Note: 1540 km from some other sources。) （3673） | 136000 （325000 (Note: 266,037 km2 from some other sources。)） | Tibet, Yunnan, (Myanmar, Thailand) | 703 （2100） | Andaman Sea | 16.2°N 97.6°E | | |
| 10 | Han River | 1577 | 159000 | Shaanxi, Hubei | 566 | Yangtze | 30.6°N 114.3°E | | |
| 11 | Yalong River | 1535 | 128439 | Qinghai, Sichuan | 571 | Yangtze（Jinsha River） | 26.6°N 101.8°E | | |
| 12 | Liao River | 1345 | 219600 | Hebei, Inner Mongolia, Jilin, Liaoning | 137.2 | Bohai Sea | 40.9°N 121.8°E | | |
| 13 | Yu River | 1157 | 78074（89677） | Yunnan, Guangxi | 476.7 (Note: 53.6 m³ from some other sources.。) | Pearl River（Xun River） | 23.4°N 110.1°E | | |
| 14 | Hotan River | 1138 | 48870 | Xinjiang | 10.28 (Note: Based on the observation from 肖塔水文站. Two origins of the Hotan are the Karakash River and the White Jade River. It was only called the Hotan when the two rivers assembled. The average annual runoff at the confluence is 2.2 billion m2, but as the Hotan River crosses the desert, a large amount of water evaporates and seeps away, causing a sharp decrease in water volume.。) | Tarim River (Note: Most waters of the Tarim come from the Aksu, which occupies three-quarters of it. The water of the Hotan only enter the Tarim in flood season, while the Yarkand only enters during years of abundant water.。) | 40.5°N 80.9°E | | |
| 15 | Hai River | 1122 (Note: This list defined Zhang River as the origin of the Hai River. "Hai River" is an umberlla term of rivers of North China flowing to the Bohai Sea, including Ji Canal River, Chaobai River, Beiyunhe, and Yongding River in northern region; while there are Daqing He, Ziya River, Yongji Canal, and Rivers in the Heilonggang Yundong area in southern region. The main stream originates from the Sancha River Estuary (三岔河口) in the old city of Tianjin (天津老城厢), and flows to the Haihe River Flood Control Gate (海河防潮闸), with a length of 72 km.。) | 234618 (Note: 318200 km² from some other sources。) | Hebei, Beijing, Tianjin, Shandong | 226 | Bohai Sea | 39.0°N 117.7°E | | |
| 16 | Jialing River | 1120 | 159800 | Gansu, Shaanxi, Sichuan, Chongqing | 659 | Yangtze | 29.6°N 106.6°E | | |
| 17 | Dadu River (Note: The Dadu River should actually be considered the origin of the Min River, given its length and water volume, which is 1203 km. Locals, however, consider the Dadu River the main river. Based on their definition, the length of the Min River is 711 km, while the section where the Min River meets the Dadu River and extends to the mouth of the Yangtze is 155 km.. This list executes the Min River.) | 1060 | 90700 (Note: 77700 km² from some other sources。) | Qinghai, Sichuan | 495 | Min River | 29.54°N 103.8°E | | |
| 18 | Wu River | 1037 | 87920 | Guizhou, Chongqing | 509 | Yangtze | 29.7°N 107.4°E | | |
| 19 | Yuan River | 1033 | 89647 | Hunan, Guizhou | 671 | Dongting Lake | 28.9°N 112.2°E | | |
| 20 | Huai River | 1000 (Note: In 2012, a Chinese scientist has redefined the source of the Huai River, which is in Song County, Henan, instead of Tongbai Mountain. Its length has been remeasured to 1,252 km as well.) | 270000 | Henan, Hubei, Anhui, Jiangsu | 595 | Yangtze, etc (Note: The mainstream of Huai River flows into the Yangtze through the Mangdao. It also includes those who flow into the Yellow Sea, North Jiangsu Main Irrigation Canal, 分淮入沂水道, and Fei Huanghe. The waterways are distributed asymmetrically in a fan-shaped and feather-like pattern.。) | 32.3°N 119.7°E | | |

== Canals ==
China is one of the oldest canal-constructing civilisations, with the oldest being the Beijing-Hangzhou Grand Canal. The largest water transfer scheme in the world is the South–North Water Transfer Project in China.

| # | Name | Length of main canal (km) | Cities flowing through | Main endpoint | Picture |
|---|---|---|---|---|---|
| 1 | Beijing-Hangzhou Grand Canal | 1801 | Beijing、Tianjin、Hebei、Shandong、Jiangsu、Zhejiang | Yuanshui Island, Qiantang River (Note: There's no "origin" for Beijing-Hangzhou Grand Canal since its complex flow and directions.) | |
| 2 | South–North Water Transfer Project Central Route | 1432 | Henan、Hebei、Tianjin、Beijing | Danjiangkou Reservoir (Origin), Tuancheng Lake, Outer Ring Canal of Tianjin | |
| 3 | South–North Water Transfer Project Eastern Route (Note: The eastern route project involves adding water pumps to the existing Grand Canal and its parallel waterways and lakes to draw water from the Yangtze and transport it to the north. 。) | 1156 (Note: It stretches 646 km south of the Yellow River, with a 17 km section crossing the river. At the Yellow River, it splits into northern and eastern routes. The northern route is a 493km long main canal flowing towards Tianjin; the eastern route is 701 km long and flows towards Shandong.。) | Jiangsu、Shandong、Hebei、Tianjin | Jiangdu Water Conservancy Project (Origin), Tianjin | |

== See also ==
- List of rivers of China
- List of river systems by length
- List of longest rivers of the United States
- List of lakes of China
- List of dams and reservoirs in China
