= Hainuke Temple =

Building in China

- 海努克庙

Religion
- Affiliation: Tibetan Buddhism (former)
- Ecclesiastical or organizational status: Temple (former)
- Status: Demolished

Location
- Location: Qapqal, Ili, Xinjiang
- Country: China

Architecture
- Completed: Early 18th century
- Demolished: 1762

Hainuke Temple (simplified Chinese: 海努克庙; traditional Chinese: 海努克廟), known as "Hainukedugang" (海努克都纲, meaning "Yak Temple") in Mongolian and "Yinding Temple" (银顶寺) in Chinese, was a temple of Gelug from the time of the Dzungar Khanate.

Hainuke Temple was destroyed and its ruins are located in Qapqal Xibe Autonomous County, Ili Kazakh Autonomous Prefecture, Xinjiang Uygur Autonomous Region.

== History ==
=== Construction ===
In the 1670s, the Olot Mongolian Junggar Tribe (厄鲁特蒙古准噶尔部) moved its capital to Ili, and the Hainuke Ancient City (海努克古城) became the capital of the Dzungar Khanate. At the beginning of the 18th century, they built the Hainuke Temple on the south bank of the Yili River.

=== Destroyed ===
In December 1753, Hainuke Temple was burned down. Later, the temple was rebuilt. In 1762, the Qing Government wanted to set up a military castle in Hainuke Temple, and the Temple was demolished.

== Hainuke Temple Relic Site ==
Hainuke Temple Relic Site (海努克庙遗址) is located in Qapqal Xibe Autonomous County, and was designated as a protected cultural relic in the Xinjiang Autonomous Region in 1966.
