= Tongtian =

Tongtian can refer to:

- Tongtian Jiaozhu, in Chinese mythology
- Tongtian River, in China
