= Dajing =

Dajing may refer to:

- Dajing, Zhejiang (大荆镇), a town in Yueqing, Zhejiang Province, China (Chinese: 大荆; pinyin: dàjīng)
- Dajing, Miluo (大荆镇), a town in Miluo City, Hunan province
- Dajing River, China (Chinese: 大靖; pinyin: dàjìng)
- Dajing Station, Beijing, China (Chinese: 大井; pinyin: dàjǐng)
- Dajing, Guangdong Province, China (Chinese: 大井; pinyin: dàjǐng)
