= Jiao River =

Jiao River may refer to:

- Jiao River (Shandong) (胶河)
- Jiao River (Zhejiang) (椒江)
