= Dai River =

Dai River may refer to:

- Dai River (Hebei), a river in Hebei Province, China
- Dai River (India), a river in Ajmer district, India
- Dai-minsar River, a river in Gujarat district, India
- Long Đại River, a river Quảng Ninh district, Quảng Bình province, North Central Coast, Vietnam
