= Wei River (disambiguation) =

The Wei River (渭河 or 渭水) is a major river in Gansu and Shaanxi Provinces in central China. The largest tributary of the Yellow River, it forms a shortcut across the river's wide Ordos Loop and was a center of early Chinese civilization.

Wei River may also refer to:

- Wei River (Shandong and Henan) (卫河), a river in Henan, Hebei, and Shandong now tributary to the Grand Canal
- Wei River (Xiang River) (沩水河 or 沩江 or 沩河), a small river in southern China's Hunan province and a tributary of the Xiang River
- Wei River (Hebei), a tributary of the Bohai Sea
- Wei River (Hubei) (洈水), a river in central China's Hubei province

== See also ==
- Wei (disambiguation)
- Weihe (disambiguation)
