= Streptomyces lacrimifluminis =

Scientific classification
- Domain: Bacteria
- Kingdom: Bacillati
- Phylum: Actinomycetota
- Class: Actinomycetia
- Order: Streptomycetales
- Family: Streptomycetaceae
- Genus: Streptomyces
- Species: S. lacrimifluminis

Binomial name
- Streptomyces lacrimifluminis Zhang et al. 2016

Type strain
- CGMCC 4.7272, JCM 31054, TTH-DM-20, Z1027

Species of bacterium

Streptomyces lacrimifluminis is a bacterium species from the genus of Streptomyces which has been isolated from soil near the Tuotuo River from the Qinghai-Tibet Plateau from China. Streptomyces lacrimifluminis produces antibacterial compounds.

== See also ==
- List of Streptomyces species
