= Shapai Dam =

- Location within China
- Country: China
- Location: Caopo Town, Wenchuan County, Ngawa, Sichuan Province
- Coordinates: 31.3161°N 103.3708°E
- Status: In use
- Opening date: 2002

Dam and spillways
- Type of dam: Arch
- Impounds: Caopo River
- Height: 130 metres (427 ft)
- Length: 230 metres (755 ft)
- Width (crest): 9.5 metres (31 ft)
- Width (base): 28 metres (92 ft)
- Dam volume: 356,000 cubic metres (12,572,021 ft^{3})
- Spillways: Two discharge tunnels
- Spillway capacity: 453 cubic metres per second (15,998 cu ft/s)

Reservoir
- Creates: Shapai Reservoir
- Total capacity: 3,135,000,000 cubic metres (2,541,586 acre⋅ft)
- Catchment area: 239.2 square kilometres (92 sq mi)

Power Station
- Hydraulic head: 270 metres (886 ft)
- Turbines: 4 x 18 MW
- Installed capacity: 36 MW

The Shapai Dam is an arch dam on the Caopo River in Wenchuan County, Ngawa, Sichuan Province, China. The dam is 130 metres (427 ft) tall and composed of roller-compacted concrete. There are no spillways on the face of the dam but two tunnels are utilized with a discharge capacity of 453 cubic metres per second (15,998 cu ft/s). A single penstock feeds water to a power station 5 kilometres (3 mi) downstream. The power station contains 2 x 18 MW generators with a combined capacity of 36 MW.

== See also ==
- List of power stations in China
