= Wei River (Shandong and Henan) =

Tributary of the Hai River

- Traditional Chinese: 衞河
- Simplified Chinese: 卫河
- Literal meaning: River of the former state of Wey
Transcriptions
Standard Mandarin
- Hanyu Pinyin: Wèi Hé
- Wade–Giles: Wei Ho

The Wei or Wey River is a river in northern Henan, southern Hebei, and western Shandong in China.

Beginning in the southern foothills of the Taihang Mountains in Xinxiang County in Henan, the river's former course extended past Dezhou to the Bohai Sea but these lower reaches were fully incorporated into the Grand Canal under the Yuan. The Wei now serves as a tributary to the canal, joining it at Linqing, Shandong. As such, its watershed forms part of the South-North Water Diversion Project.

== See also ==
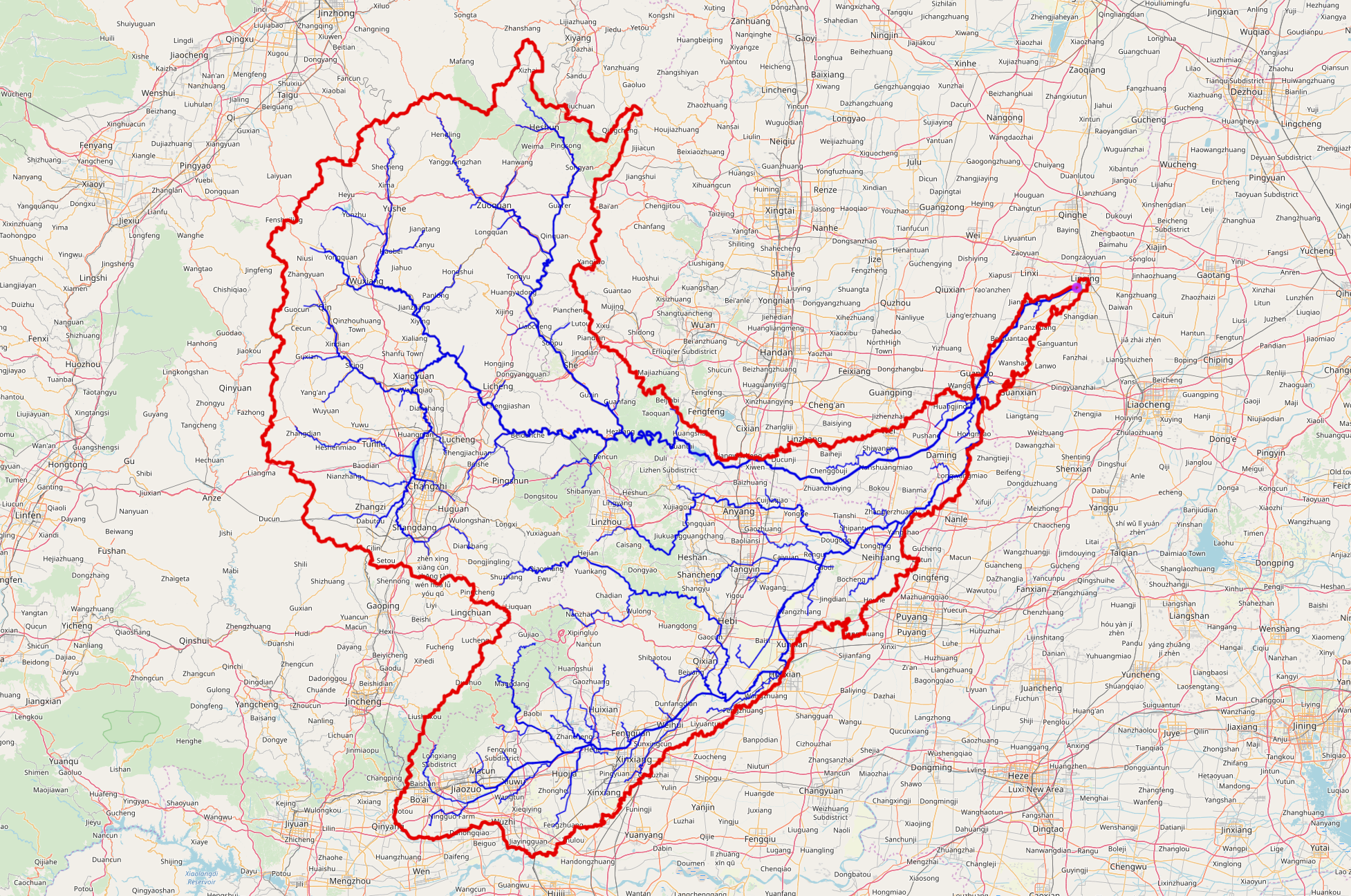
Wei river basin

- Other Wei Rivers
- State of Wey, the river's namesake
