= Yele Dam =

- Location within China
- Country: China
- Location: Mianning County and Shimian County, Sichuan Province
- Coordinates: 28°55′11″N 102°13′11″E
- Status: Operational
- Construction began: 2000
- Opening date: 2006
- Construction cost: $385 million USD 2.537 billion RMB

Dam and spillways
- Type of dam: Embankment, rock-fill
- Impounds: Nanya River
- Height: 124.5 metres (408 ft)
- Length: 411 metres (1,348 ft)
- Width (crest): 14 metres (46 ft)
- Dam volume: 6,200,000 cubic metres (218,950,934 ft^{3})

Reservoir
- Creates: Yele Reservoir
- Total capacity: 298,000,000 cubic metres (241,593 acre⋅ft)
- Catchment area: 323 square kilometres (125 sq mi)

Power Station
- Commission date: 2005-2006
- Hydraulic head: 644.8 metres (2,115 ft) Max.
- Turbines: 2 x 120 MW Pelton turbines
- Installed capacity: 240 MW
- Annual generation: 647 kWh

The Yele Dam is an embankment dam on the Nanya River along the border of Mianning County and Shimian County, Sichuan Province, China. It is 124.5 metres (408 ft) high and 411 metres (1,348 ft) long. Because the dam lies within a Level VIII earthquake intensity zone, its core is composed of asphalt concrete. Construction on the dam began in 2000, the reservoir began impounding on January 1, 2005 and the entire project was complete in August 2006. The purpose of the dam is to produce hydroelectricity and it supports a 240 MW power station. Water from the dam's reservoir is diverted into a 7.2 kilometres (4 mi) long headrace tunnel before reaching the power station.

== See also ==
- List of power stations in China
