= Fu River (Jiangxi) =

River in Jiangxi, China

Coordinates: 26°33′03″N 116°14′10″E

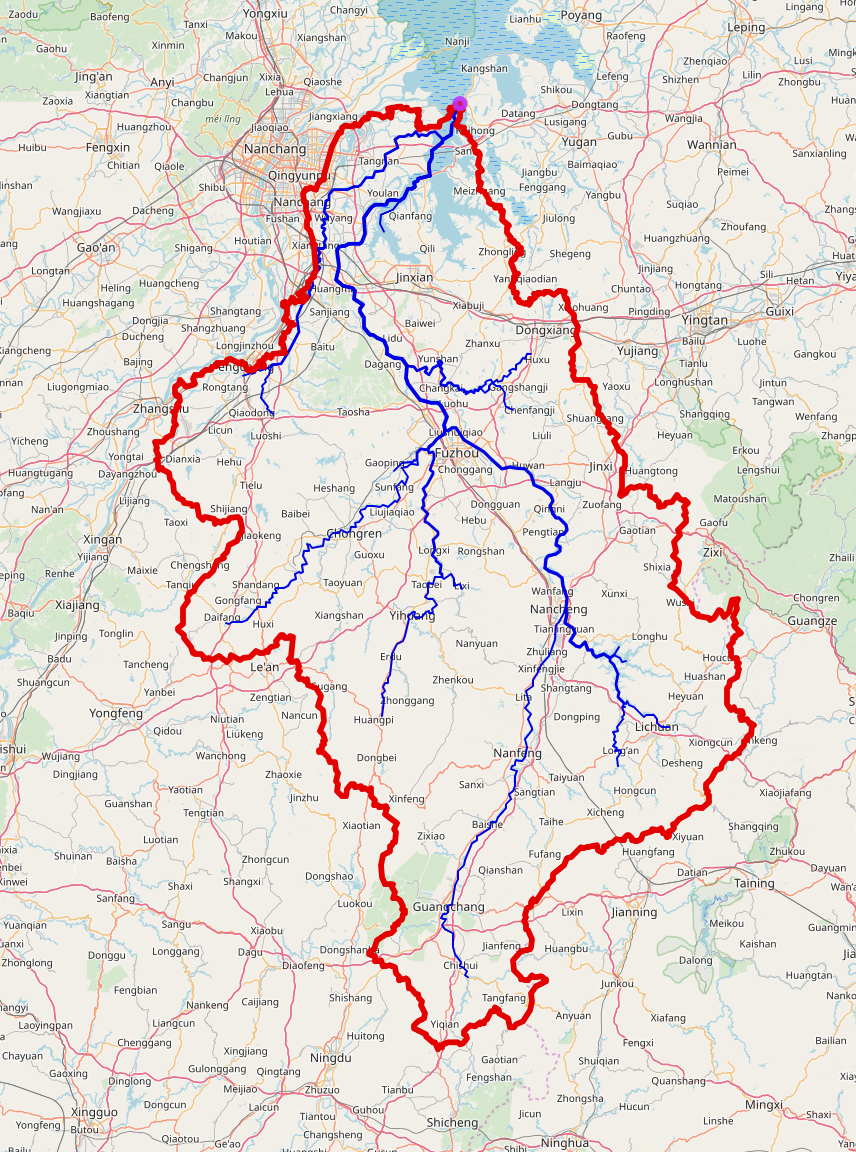
Fuhe river basin

The Fu River, or Fuhe (Chinese: 抚河), is a river in China's Jiangxi province. Its basin occupies most of the Fuzhou prefecture of Jiangxi.

The Fu River has it origin on the northwestern slopes of the Wuyi Mountains, from where it flows in the general north-northwestern and northwestern direction. Via a network of smaller lakes and channels in Nanchang prefecture, the waters of the Fuhe eventually reach the Poyang Lake, to which it is one of the major tributaries, along with the Gan River (which flows from the south/southwest) and a number of smaller rivers coming from the east and west.

As the Poyang Lake drains into the Yangtze, the Fu River is part of the Yangtze Basin as well.

== See also ==
- List of rivers of China
