= Wei River (Hebei) =

River in Hebei, China, that flows into Bohai Bay

The Wei River is a river in Hebei Province in northeastern China. It flows into Bohai Bay.

== See also ==
- Other Wei Rivers
