= Dajing River =

River in China

Dajing River (Chinese: 大靖河; pinyin: dàjìng hé) is a river of China. It flows into the South China Sea.

== See also ==
- List of rivers in China
