= Jiao River (Shandong) =

- Native name: 胶河 (Chinese)

Location
- Country: China

The Jiao River (Chinese: 胶河; pinyin: Jiāo Hé) is a river of Shandong, China. It is part of the Yellow Sea basin.

== See also ==
- List of rivers in China
