= Weihe =

Weihe may refer to:

== Aircraft ==
- DFS Weihe, glider
- Focke-Wulf Fw 58, advanced trainer

== People with the surname ==
- Carl Ernst August Weihe (1779–1834), German botanist and physician
- Podge Weihe (1862–1914), Major League Baseball player

== Places ==
- Wei He, a tributary of the Yellow River in China
- Weihe, Heilongjiang (苇河), a town in Shangzhi, Heilongjiang, China
- Weihe (Werra), a river in central Germany
- Weihe Viaduct, bridge of the A4 motorway near Richelsdorf, Germany
