= Caopo River =

Coordinates: 31°15′33″N 103°47′02″E

Caopo 草坡河

Location
- Country: China

Physical characteristics
- Mouth
  - location: Min River

The Caopo River (Chinese: 草坡河) is a tributary of the Min River in Wenchuan County, Sichuan Province, China. It is interrupted by the Shapai Dam.
