= Konqi River =

River in Xinjiang, China

Konqi River, also transliterated as Kongque River (Uyghur: كۆنچى دەرياسى; Uyghur Latin alphabet: Könchi Deryasi), is a river in Bayingolin Mongol Autonomous Prefecture, Xinjiang Uyghur Autonomous Region, People's Republic of China. It is one of the tributaries of the Tarim River system. The river originates from Bosten Lake, whose water source comes from the Kaidu River, and flows out from the western part of the lake. It passes through Tiemenguan, flows across Korla City and Yuli County, and eventually empties into Lop Nur. The river has a total length of 942 kilometers, an average annual runoff of 1.2 billion cubic meters, and a drainage basin area of 33,200 square kilometers.

Due to water diversion projects supplying the Tarim River, as well as the construction of reservoirs and dams in the Puhui and Akesu Pu areas, the river section downstream of Yuli County has experienced flow cessation.

Both “Kongque” and “Konqi” are Chinese transliterations of the Uyghur word كۆنچى (könchi), which originally means leather craftsman. According to local legend, leatherworkers frequently washed hides in this river, giving rise to its name. Another view holds that the name Konqi River appeared earlier, and that during the Guangxu reign of the Qing dynasty, when the Qing government established a postal relay station along the river, it was first translated as Kongque River.

There is also a legend that the Eastern Han general Ban Chao once watered his horses at this river, hence it is sometimes referred to as the Yinma River (“Horse-Watering River”). As the river is the principal waterway of Korla, it is also known as the Korla River.

In Notes on the Waterways of the Western Regions (Xiyu Shuidao Ji) by the Qing dynasty geographer Xu Song, the river is described as follows:

“The river flows westward for more than thirty li and exits the mountains. It then flows southward for more than twenty li, passing between Korla and the military post. It continues southwest for seventy li, passing south of the Halabulake military post. After more than twenty li, it turns west again, passing south of the Kuerchu military post, and flows westward. After a total of three hundred li, it is still called the Haidu River.”
