= Dangqu =

River in Qinghai province, China

Coordinates: 34.0921°N 92.9132°E

Dam Qu
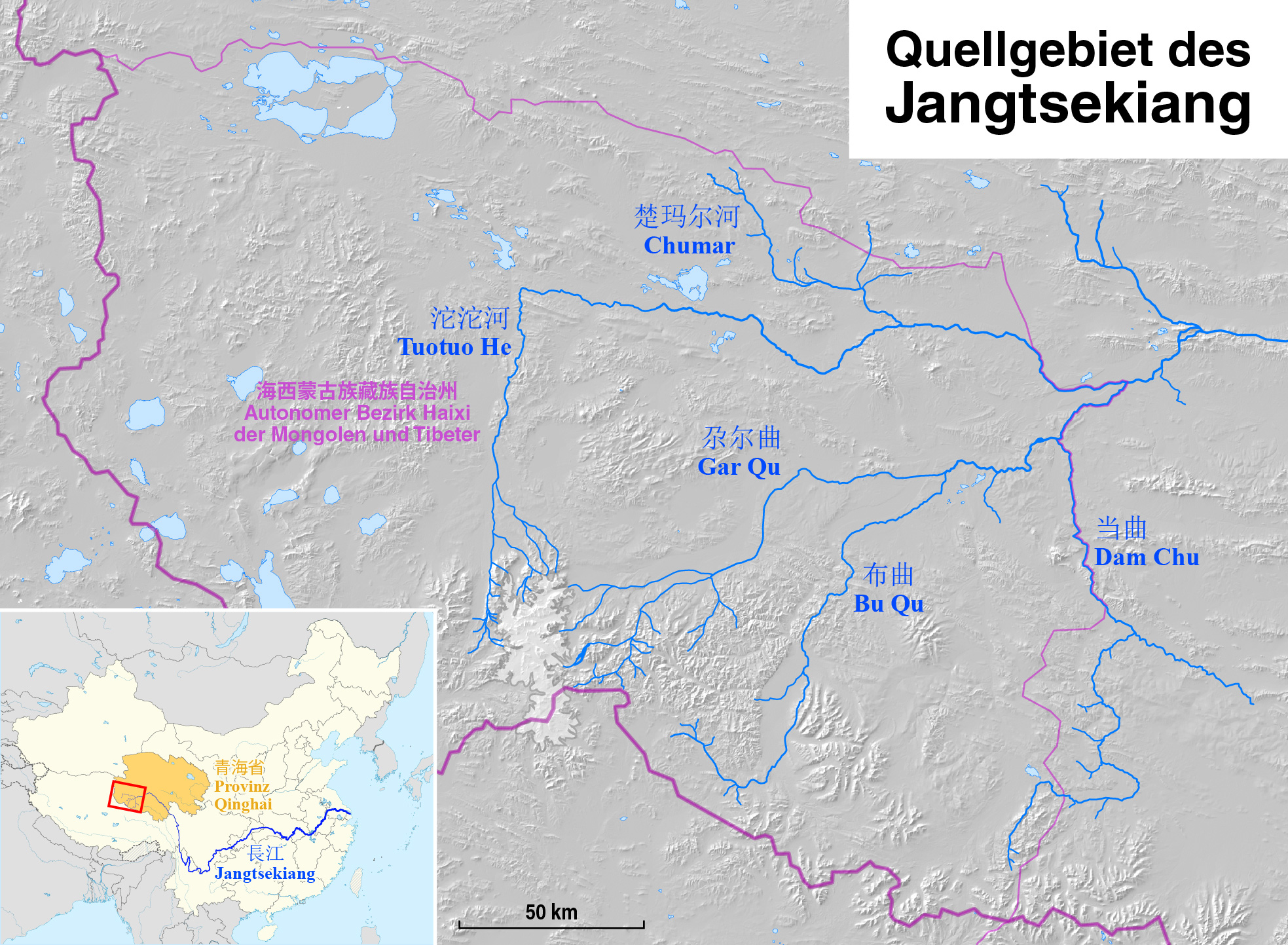
- The headwaters of the Yangtze, including the Ulan Moron ("Tuotuo"), Dangqu, Buqu, and Garqu.

Location
- Country: China

Physical characteristics
- Source: Tanggula Mountains
  - location: Jari Mountain
  - elevation: 5,308 m (17,415 ft)
- Mouth: Tongtian River to a confluence with Tuotuo River
- Length: 365.7 km (227.2 mi)
- Basin size: 30,540 km^{2} (11,790 sq mi)
- Discharge
  - average: 2,571 m^{3}/s (90,800 cu ft/s)

Basin features
- Tributaries
  - left: Bu Qu River; Gar Qu River; Za'Gya Zangbo

The Dangqu, Dam Qu (Chinese: 当曲, p Dāngqū) or Dam Chu (Tibetan: འདམ་ཆུ, w 'Dam Chu, lit. "Marshy River") is the longest source of the Yangtze River, with a total length of 365.7 km (227.2 mi) located in the Qinghai province of the People's Republic of China. It runs from its source in an eastern offshoot of the Tanggula Mountains (唐古拉山), receives its main tributary the Buqu-Gar Qu River (布曲), and has a confluence with the Ulan Moron, where the Tongtian River is formed. The Dangqu has been discovered to be the actual and the longest headwater of the Yangtze River under modern criteria, although the nearby Ulan Moron or Tuotuo was traditionally regarded as the primary river of the two.

== Moron Us ==
Traditionally, the Dangqu—sometimes under the name Akdam, Akedamuqu, or A-ko-ta-mu-ch'ü—and the Buqu were both regarded as tributaries of the Garqu (尕尔曲), then known as the Moron Us (Mongolian: Mörön Us or Маруй-Ус, Maruy-Us; 木鲁乌苏河, p Muluwusu He) or Dequ (Дечу, Deču). Under modern criteria, the Garqu is instead considered to be a tributary of the Buqu.
