= Nanya River =

Coordinates: 28°59′14″N 102°17′12″E

Nanya

Location
- Country: China

Physical characteristics
- Mouth
  - location: Dadu River near Yele

The Nanya River is the primary right tributary of the middle Dadu River (Dadu He) — in Sichuan Province, southern China. The Dadu is a tributary of the upper Yangtze River (Chang Jiang).

The Nanya River borders Mianning County and Shimian County and is interrupted by the Yele Dam.
