= Woken River =

River in Heilongjiang, China

Coordinates: 46°20′54.06″N 129°33′51.62″E

Woken River (Chinese: 倭肯河), is a river in the Chinese province of Heilongjiang.
