= Ulan Moron =

River in Qinghai province, China

Coordinates: 34.0921°N 92.9132°E

Tuotuo River
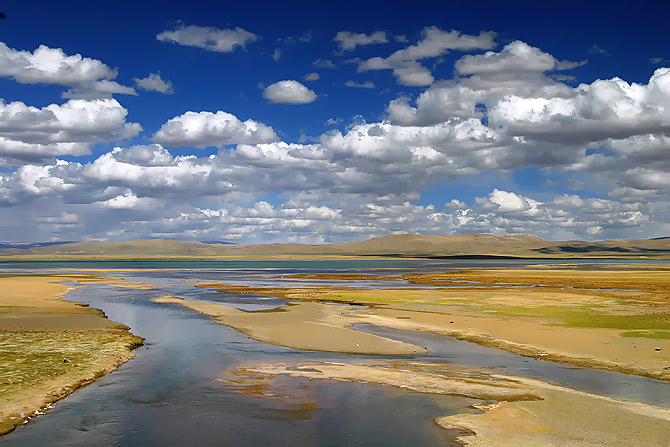
- The Ulan Moron or Tuotuo River

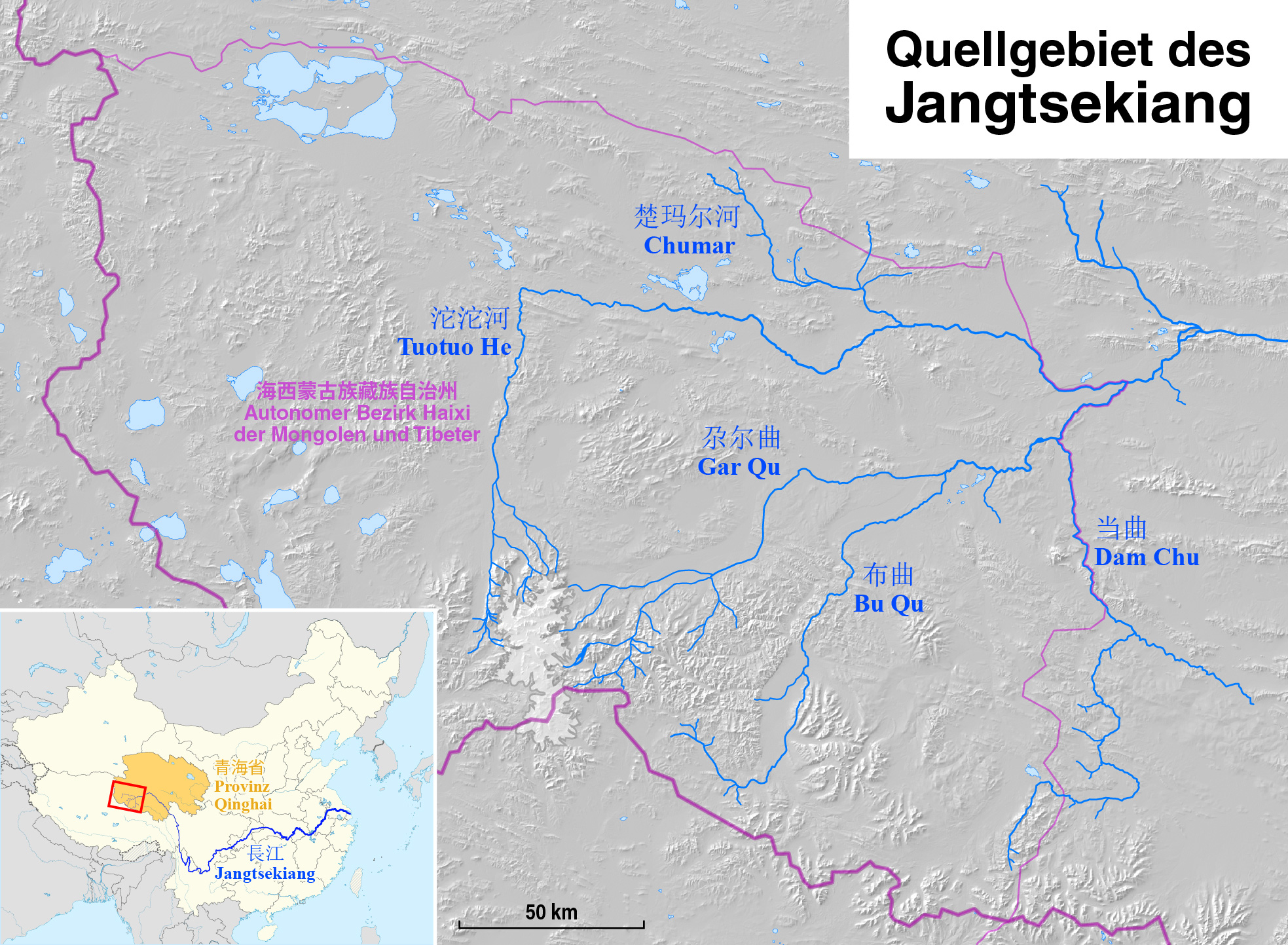
- The headwaters of the Yangtze, including the Ulan Moron ("Tuotuo He"), Dangqu, Buqu, and Garqu.

Location
- Country: China

Physical characteristics
- Source: Tanggula Mountains
  - location: Geladaindong Peak
  - elevation: 6,621 m (21,722 ft)
- Mouth: Tongtian River to a confluence with Dangqu River.
- Length: 361.4 km (224.6 mi)
- Basin size: 16,840 km^{2} (6,500 sq mi)
- Discharge
  - average: 924 m^{3}/s (32,600 cu ft/s)

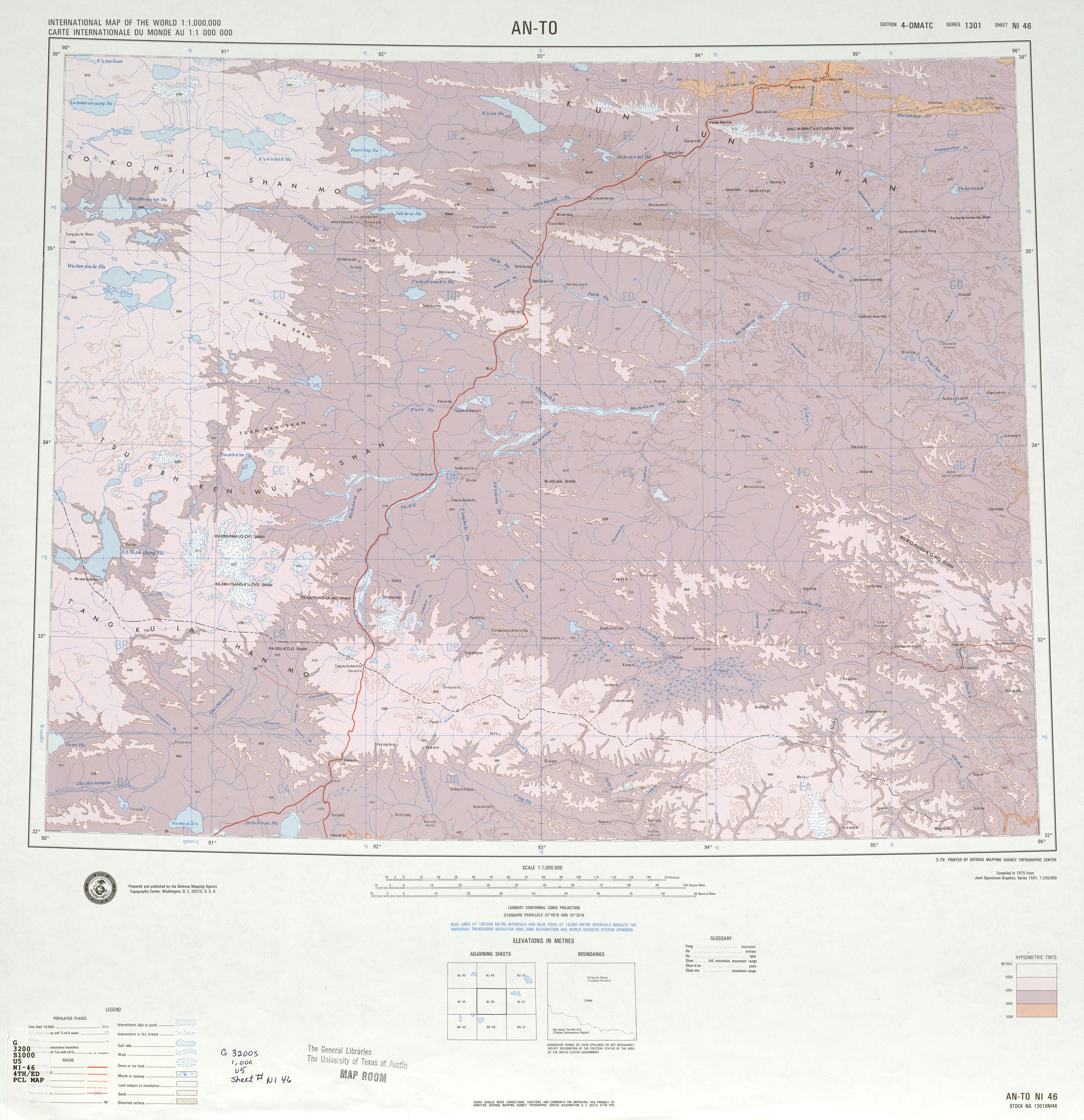
1975 DMA map of the region around the Ulan Moron ("T'o-t'o Ho")

The Ulan Moron (Mongolian: ᠤᠯᠠᠭᠠᠨᠮᠥᠷᠡᠨ, Ulaan Mörön, lit. "Red River"; Chinese: 乌兰木伦, p Wūlánmùlún), Mar Qu (Tibetan), or Tuotuo River (沱沱河, (Note: In Chinese, the character 河 originally described the Yellow River and 江 the Yangtze. In modern practice, a jiang is usually a longer river, while he varies from shorter rivers (as the Tuotuo) to creeks (such as Suzhou Creek in Shanghai).) p Tuótuó Hé, lit. "Tearful River"; (Note: But note Mei Zuyan who claims the Chinese name merely transliterates a former Tibetan name. Bolstering his point is the alternate Chinese spelling of the river's name as the 托托. In fact, if the name was originally a transliteration, it probably derives from a variant of the Mongolian Togtoh.) Tibetan: ཐོག་ཐོག་ཆུ་, ZYPY: Togtog Qu) is the second longest source of the Yangtze River after Dangqu River, with a total length of 361.4 km (224.6 mi) long, located in Qinghai province in the People's Republic of China.

The Ulan Moron begins as melt-off from the Geladandong glaciers and runs to a confluence with the Dangqu or Dam Chu River, where they form the Tongtian River, which subsequently becomes the Yangtze River. Although the Dangqu has been found to be the longest source of the Yangtze under the usual modern criteria, the Ulan Moron has been traditionally regarded as the main river and source. It belongs to the East China Sea watershed basin.

== See also ==
- Yangtze River
- List of rivers in China
