= Dai River (Hebei) =

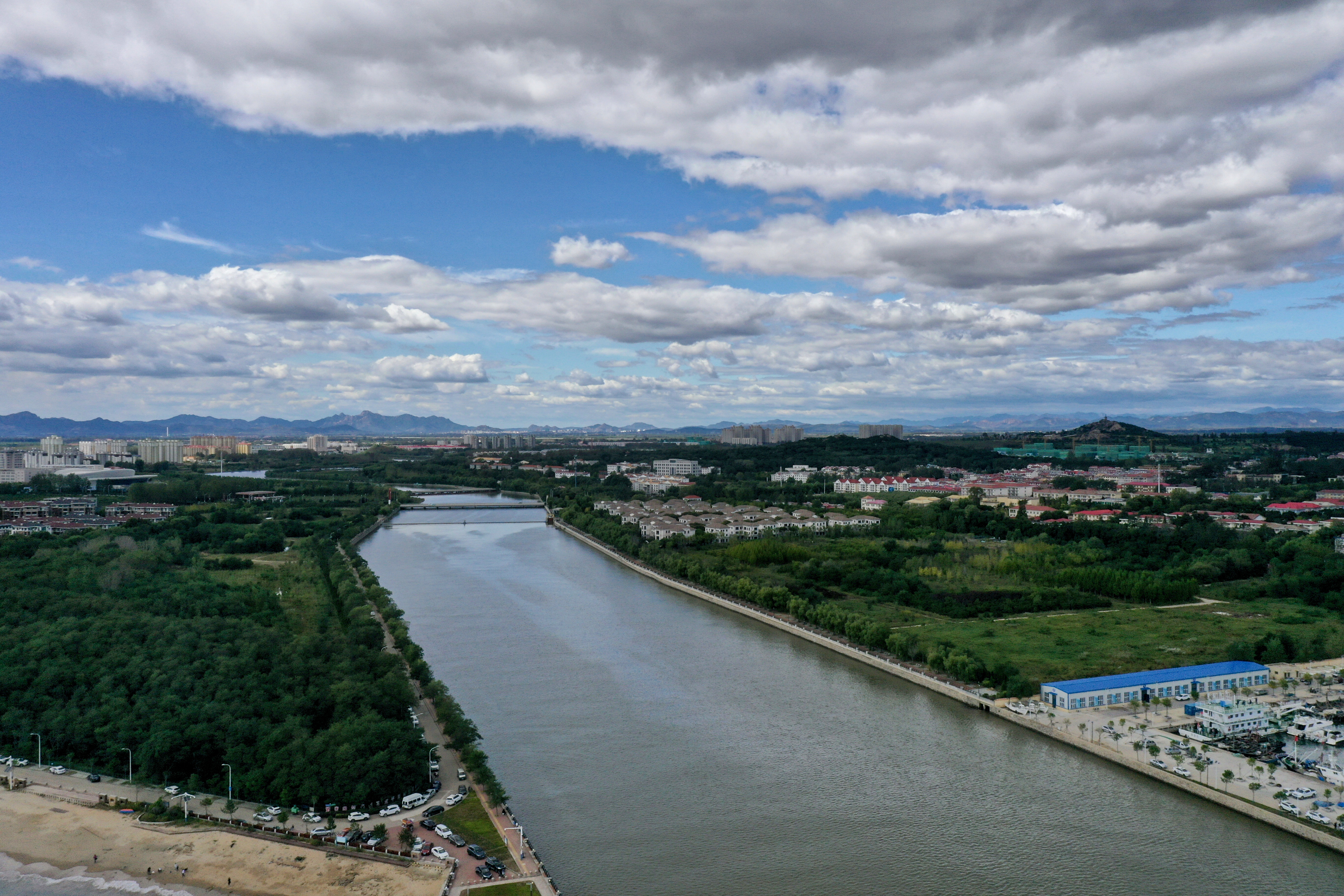
- Native name: 戴河 (Chinese)

Location
- Country: China

The Dai River (Chinese: 戴河; pinyin: dàihé) is a river in Hebei, China that empties into the northwest Bohai Gulf near Qinghuangdao. The coast north of the mouth is generally rocky, while the coast to the south is sandy. A shipyard and a jetty are located on the east bank of the mouth. Damming and the creation of reservoirs on the rivers emptying into the Qinghuangdao coast has led to severe erosion along that stretch of coastline, especially around river mouths. The erosion around the river has been exacerbated by the presence of the jetty and heavy tourist use of the area, including a pier to the northeast of the river.
