= Yili River =

- Native name: 以禮河 (Chinese)

Location
- Country: Yunnan Province

Physical characteristics
- Mouth
  - coordinates: 26°46′49″N 102°59′30″E
- Length: 122 kilometers

The Yili River or Yili He (Chinese: 以禮河), originally named "Yini River" (以尼河), from the Yi language. In the noun "Yini", "Yi" refers water, and "Ni" refers willow, which means to insert willows by the river, so it is also called "Willow River" (柳树河).

Located in Yunnan Province of People's Republic of China, it is a river in the Yangtze River basin, which merges into the right bank of the Jinsha River and belongs to the Jinsha River system.

Yili River is 122 kilometers long, with a drainage area of 2,558 square kilometers and an average annual flow of 39 cubic meters per second.
