= Tongtian River =

River in Qinghai province, China

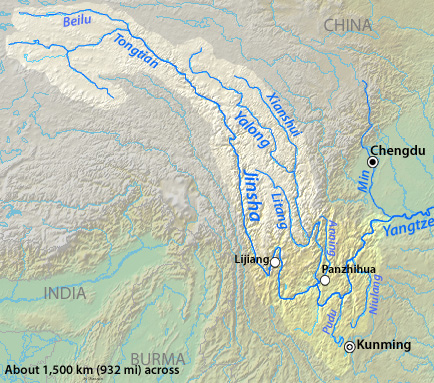
- Tongtian River is the source of Jinsha River.

Location
- Country: China

Physical characteristics
- Source: confluence of Dangqu and Tuotuo River
- Mouth: Jinsha River near the border of Qinghai and Sichuan
- Length: 1,012 km (629 mi)
- Basin size: 138,000 km^{2} (53,000 sq mi)
- Discharge
  - average: 4,000 m^{3}/s (140,000 cu ft/s)

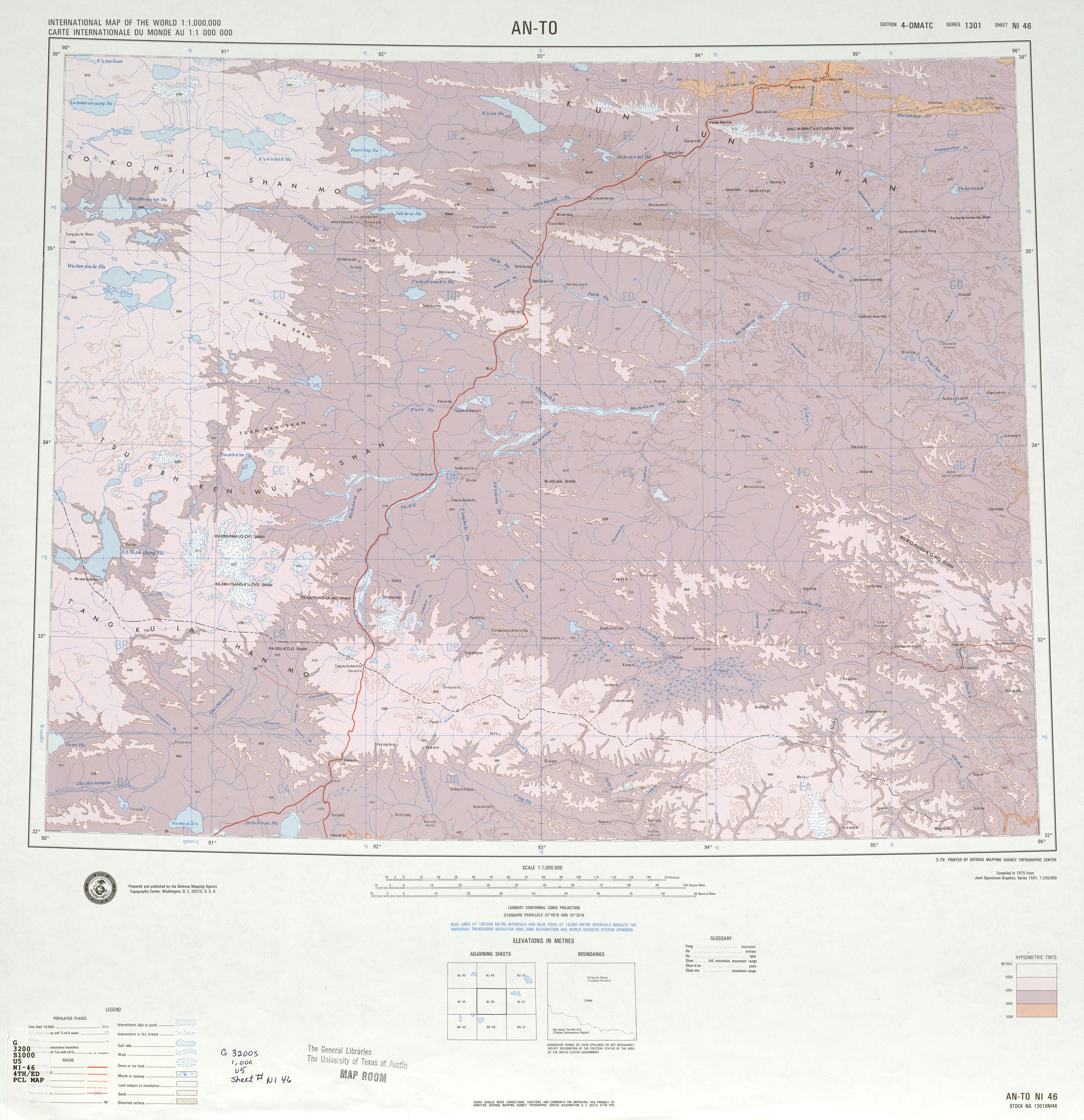
A 1975 DMA map of the area around the Tongtian River ("T'ung-t'ien Ho")

The Tongtian River (Chinese: 通天河, Tōngtiān Hé) or Zhi Qu (Tibetan) is a 1,012 km (629 mi) long river in Qinghai Province in western China. It begins at the confluence of the Ulan Moron and Dangqu rivers, before flowing southeast and meeting the Jinsha River near the border of Qinghai and Sichuan. It is part of the Yangtze River drainage basin.

== Name ==
The Chinese name comes from a fabled river in the classic novel Journey to the West. In antiquity, it was called the Yak River. In Mongolian, this section is known as the Murui-ussu (Муруй-Ус, lit. "Winding Water") and is sometimes confused with the nearby Baishui.

== Geography ==
The three principal headwaters—the Chumaer, Muluwusu, and Akedamu rivers—join to form the Tongtian River, which flows southeast to Zhimenda near the frontier between Qinghai and Sichuan provinces, where it becomes the Jinsha River (Jinsha Jiang). The Jinsha River is a primary tributary of the Yangtze River (Chang Jiang).

The Tongtian River is one of the five large rivers flowing from headwaters on the Qinghai-Tibet Plateau. Its length is 1,012 kilometres, draining an area of 138,000 square kilometres. Pilgrims go to the river because it is mythical, but also it is known for its "sutra bridge" and "Gyiana Mani stones".

== Dams ==
The Tongtian is planned for heavy development, primarily for hydroelectric power. As of March 2014 a total of 10 dams are planned for the river. Those dams are listed below from downstream to upstream.

- Sewu Dam – Planned, 176.8 MW
- Xirong Dam – Planned, 160.5 MW
- Cefang Dam – Planned, 158 MW
- Genzhe Dam – Planned, 612 MW
- Leyi Dam – Planned, 112.8 MW
- Dequkou Dam – Planned, 276.5 MW
- Ruoqin Dam – Planned, 200 MW
- Lumari Dam – Planned, 72 MW
- Yage Dam – Planned, 63.6 MW
- Marigei Dam – Planned, 10.4 MW

== See also ==
- Index: Tributaries of the Yangtze River
- List of rivers in China
