= List of dolmens =

This is an incomplete list of dolmens, a type of single-chamber megalithic tomb. 40% of the world's dolmens are found in Korea. Dolmens are also found in Europe, especially Northern France, Britain and Ireland.

== Dolmen sites in Asia ==
=== Caucasus ===
Over 3,000 dolmens and other structures can be found in the North-Western Caucasus region in Russia, where more and more dolmens are discovered in the mountains each year. These dolmens are related to the Maykop culture. This great city of dolmens was built along the shores of the Black Sea from Maykop down to Sochi. The inhabitants were metal workers. The dolmens were vaults or safes of stone, with a narrow circular entrance that could be tapped with a round screw of stone. Supposedly the dolmens were used to hide and protect metal objects: gold, silver, bronze, jewels and some other treasure. Trade of these objects was done with Persia, Assyria, Egypt and Crete. The Dolmen City was pillaged and sacked by Scythian invaders in the early first millennium BCE. The metal workers were enslaved.

=== China ===
A large group of dolmens along the Huifa River in Jilin Province were listed as a Major Historical and Cultural Site Protected at the National Level in 2006. The dolmens have been dated to the fifth century BCE and total more than 80. They are linked to similar monuments found on the Korean Peninsula and the Liao River basin.

=== India ===
List of dolmens in India, from north to south, is.

==== Andhra Pradesh ====
- Dannanapeta megalithic dolmen near Amadalavalasa town, world's large single capstone dolmen with 36 ft in length and 14 ft in width and 2 ft thickness, is of early Iron Age.

==== Karnataka ====
- Pandavara Betta (Pandavar Gudda hill) has more than 50 dolmens. Pandavara Betta is at a distance of 35 km from Sakleshpur. Lord Shiva's Betta Byraveshwara Temple is located atop Pandavar Gudda Hill. Dolmen site on the Pandavar Gudda Hill is 7 km (4.3 mi) from Somwarpet towards Shaniwar Sante in Madikeri (Coorg) district.
- Hire Benakal or Hirebennnukullu (ಹಿರೇಬೆಣಕಲ್ಲು in Kannada) is a megalithic site located in Koppal district, approximately 10 kilometers (6.2 miles) west of the town of Gangavati. Dated to the period between 800 BCE and 200 BCE, it contains roughly 400 megalithic funerary monuments, which have been dated to the transitional period between the Neolithic and Iron Ages. Locally known in Kannada as Elllu Guddugulllu (meaning 'the seven hills'), its specific name is Moryar Guḍḍa (meaning 'the hill of the Moryas'). Hirebenakal is reported to be the largest necropolis among the approximately 2,000 megalithic sites found in South India, most of which are located in the state of Karnataka.
- Konnur (Tapaswi Maradi) has more than 3 dolmens. Tapaswi Maradi is at a distance of 5 km from Gokak Falls.

==== Kerala ====
- Marayur, there are dozens of dolmens belonging to the Stone Age and Iron Age.

==== Tamil Nadu ====
- Moral Pari near Mallachandram had more than 100 dolmens. The site is located 19 km (12 mi) from Krishnagiri district in Tamil Nadu.

==== Madhya Pradesh ====
- Bhimbetka rock shelters
- Maharashtra:
- Hirapur dolmen
- Telangana: Following dolmen graves were identified:
- Dharmasagar in Hanamkonda district, one dolmen is located in the Dharmasar Hillock near Dharmasagar reservoir.
- Eturnagaram in Mulugu district, dolmen are located in the forest in Eturnagaram Wildlife Sanctuary.
- Tadvai in Bhupalpally district, the archaeology department found the megalithic dolmens at the forest near Tadwai.
- Thatikonda in Jangaon district, dolmen were found by the historical researcher Ratnakar Reddy.

=== Korea ===
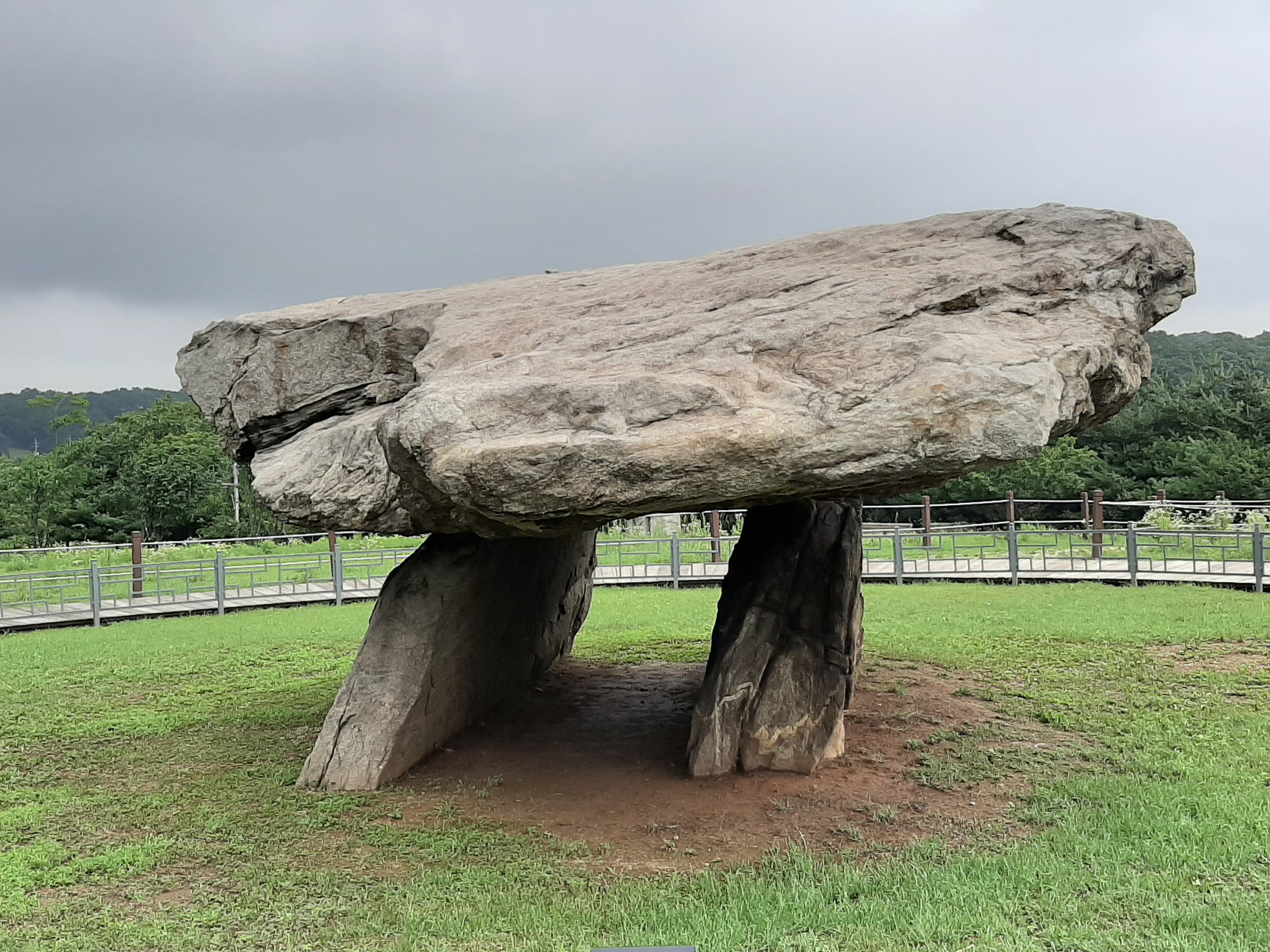
Example of a southern-style dolmen at Ganghwa Island

Korean dolmens exhibit a morphology distinct from the Atlantic European dolmen. The largest concentration of dolmens in the world is found on the Korean Peninsula. With an estimated 35,000 dolmens, Korea alone accounts for nearly 40% of the world’s total. The largest distribution of these is on the west coast area of South Korea, an area that would eventually become host to the Mahan confederacy and be united under the rule of the ancient kingdom of Baekje at one time.

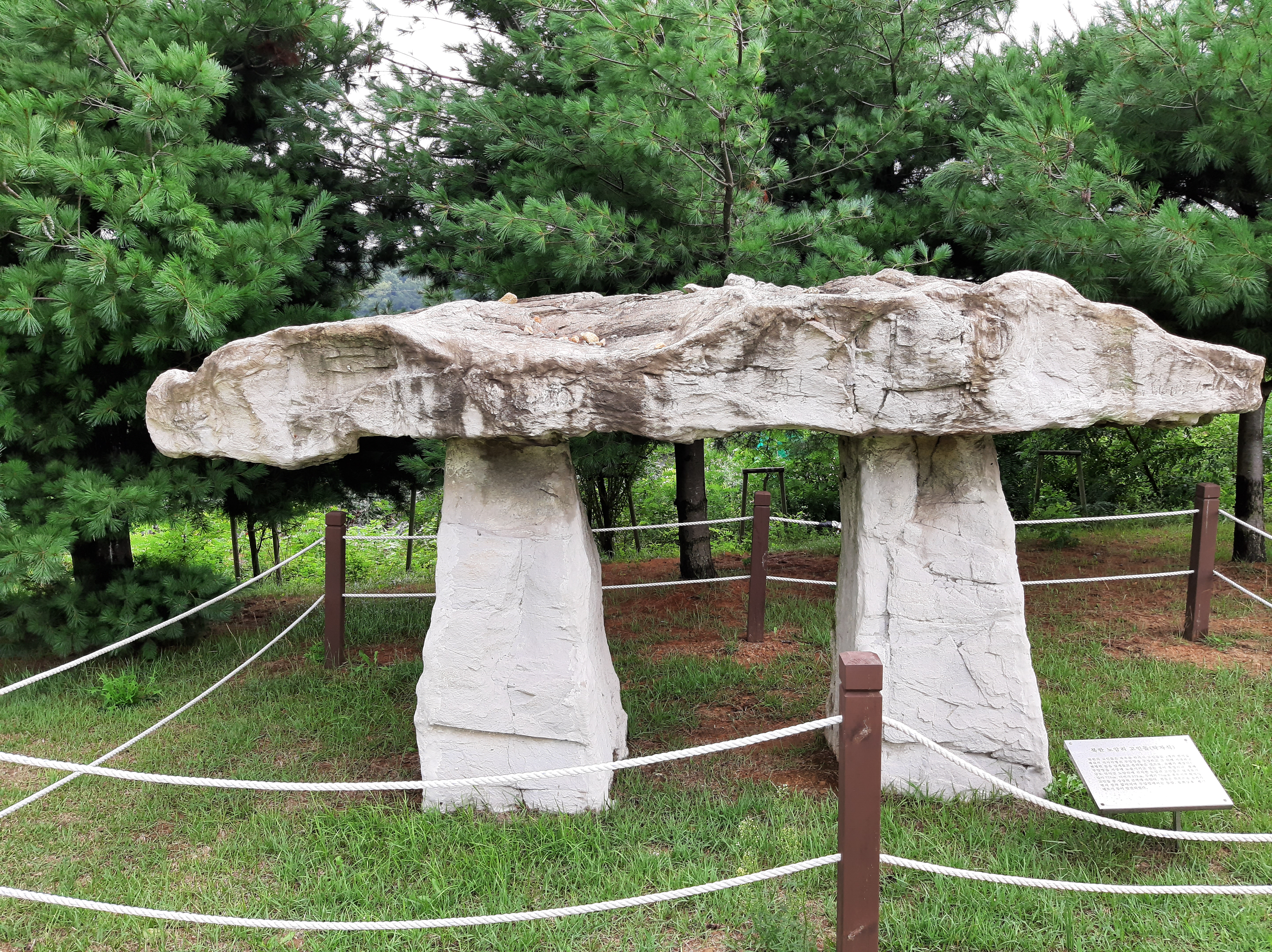
Example of a northern-style dolmen at Ganghwa Island

Three specific UNESCO World Heritage sites at Gochang, Hwasun and Ganghwa ( Hwasun – 34.9775414°N 126.931551°E) by themselves account for over 1,000 dolmens.

The Korean word for dolmen is goindol (Korean: 고인돌) "supported stone". Serious studies of the Korean megalithic monuments were not undertaken until relatively recently, well after much research had already been conducted on dolmens in other regions of the world. Since 1945, new research has been conducted by Korean scholars. In 1981 a curator of National Museum of Korea, Gon'gil Ji, classified Korean dolmens into two general types: northern and southern.

The boundary between them falls at the Bukhan River although examples of both types are found on either side. Northern style dolmens stand above ground with a four sided chamber and a megalithic roof (also referred to as "table type"), while southern style dolmens are normally built into the ground and contain a stone chest or pit covered by a rock slab.

Korean dolmens can also be divided into three main types: the table type, the go-table type and the unsupported capstone type. The dolmen in Ganghwa is a northern-type, table-shaped dolmen and is the biggest stone of this kind in South Korea, measuring 2.6 by 7.1 by 5.5 m (8.5 by 23.3 by 18.0 ft). There are many sub-types and different styles. Southern type dolmens are associated with burials but the reason for building northern style dolmens is uncertain.

Due to the vast numbers and great variation in styles, no absolute chronology of Korean dolmens has yet been established. It is generally accepted that the Korean megalithic culture emerged from the late Neolithic age, during which agriculture developed on the peninsula, and flourished throughout the Bronze Age. Some dolmens depict astronomical formations, dated up to 3000 BCE, effectively the first star-chart in the world. How and why Korea has produced so many dolmens is still poorly understood. There is no current conclusive theory on the origin of Korea's megalithic culture, and so it is difficult to determine the true cultural character of Korean dolmens. Some dolmens are also found in Manchuria and the Shandong Peninsula. Off the peninsula, similar specimens can be found in smaller numbers, but they are often considerably larger than the Korean dolmens. It is a mystery why this culture flourished so extensively only on the Korean peninsula and its vicinity in Northeast Asia.

=== Middle East and Iran ===
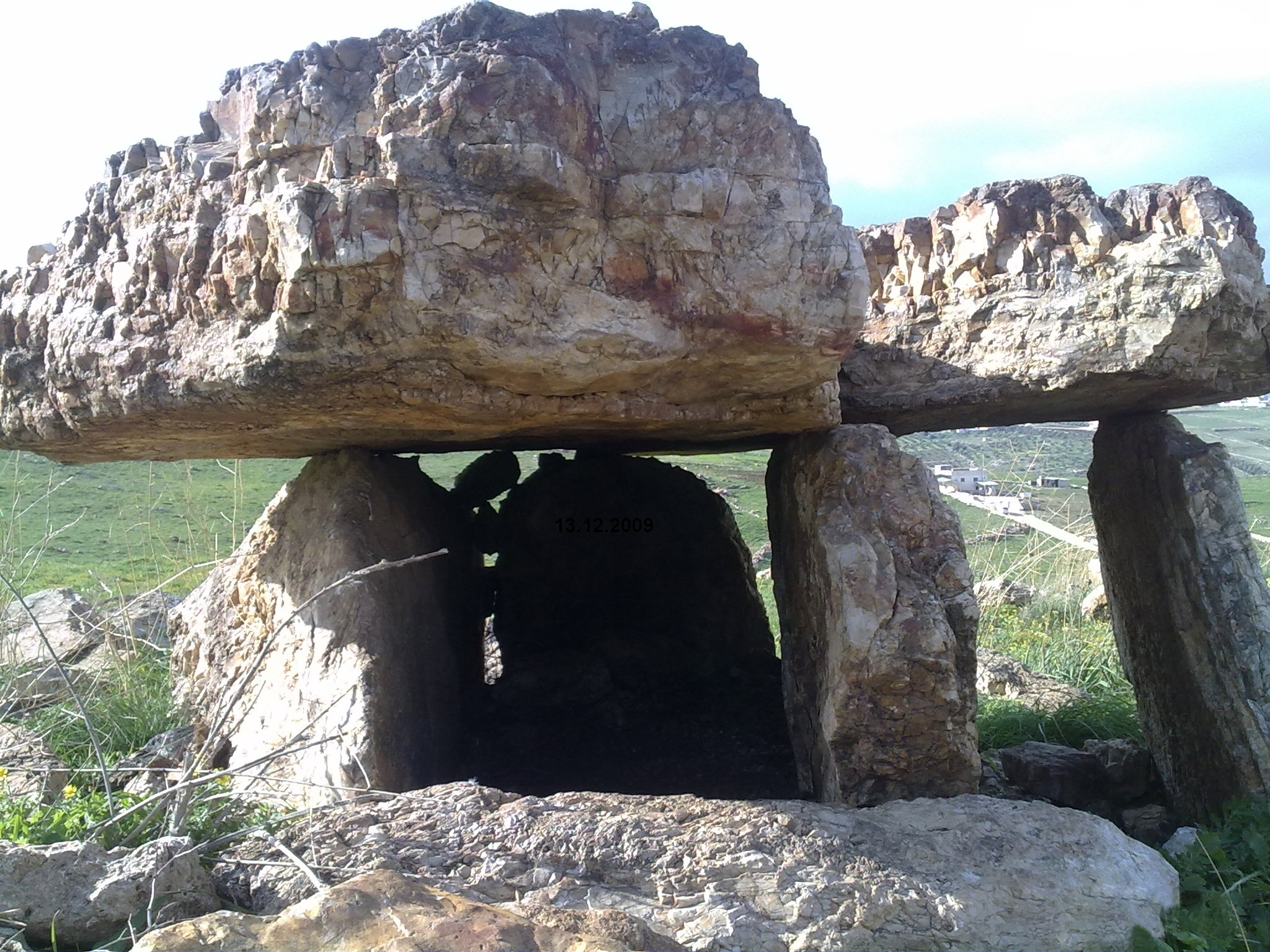
Flint dolmen in Johfiyeh, Jordan

Dolmens can be found in the Levant, some along the Jordan Rift Valley (Upper Galilee in Israel, the Golan Heights, Jordan, Lebanon, Palestine, Syria, and southeast Turkey.

Dolmens in the Levant are a different, unrelated tradition to that of Europe, although they are often treated "as part of a trans-regional phenomenon that spanned the Taurus Mountains to the Arabian Peninsula." In the Levant, they are of Early Bronze rather than Late Neolithical age. They are mostly found along the Jordan Rift Valley's eastern escarpment, and in the hills of the Galilee, im clusters near Early Bronze I proto-urban settlements (3700–3000 BCE), additionally restricted by geology to areas allowing the quarrying of slabs of megalithic size. In the Levant, geological constraints led to a local burial tradition with a variety of tomb forms, dolmens being one of them.

Numerous large dolmens are in the Israeli national park at Gamla in the Golan Heights. In northern Jordan, there are many examples of flint dolmens in the historical villages of Johfiyeh and Natifah. The greatest number of dolmens in Jordan are around Madaba, like the ones at Al-Faiha village, 10 km (6.2 mi) to the west of Madaba city. Two dolmens are in Hisban, and the most have been found in Wadi Zarqa Ma'in at Murayghat, which are being destroyed by gravel quarries.

In Iran some dolmens can be seen in Meshgin Shahr County at Shahr Yeri or Pirazmian.

== In Africa ==
=== Horn of Africa ===
In northern Somalia, the town of Aw Barkhadle is surrounded by a number of ancient structures. Among these are dolmens, burial mounds, menhirs (standing stones), and stelae.

=== North Africa ===
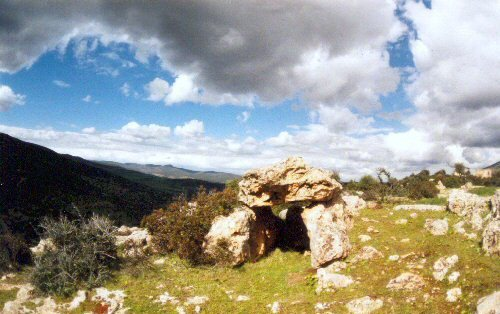
Dolmen at Roknia, an ancient necropolis in the Guelma region of northeast Algeria; the site includes more than 7000 dolmens spread over an area of 2 km (1.2 mi)

In northern Tunisia, Dougga is an important ancient site, which contains a necropolis with dolmens. The settlement also features a sanctuary dedicated to Ba'al Hammon, neo-Punic stelae, the mausoleum, architectural fragments, and a temple dedicated to Masinissa, the remains of which were found during archaeological excavations.

== Europe ==
=== Overview ===
Megalithic tombs are found from the Mediterranean Sea, Baltic Sea and North Sea coasts south to Spain and Portugal. Hunebedden are chamber tombs similar to dolmens and date to the middle Neolithic (Funnelbeaker culture, 4th millennium BCE). They consist of a kerb surrounding an oval mound, which covered a rectangular chamber of stones with the entrance on one of the long sides. Some have a more complex layout and include an entrance passage giving them a T-shape. Various menhirs and dolmens are located around the Mediterranean islands of Malta and Gozo. Pottery uncovered in these structures allowed the attribution of the monuments to the Ġgantija and Mnajdra temples culture of the early Neolithic Age.

Dolmen sites fringe the Irish Sea and are found in south-east Ireland, Wales, Devon and Cornwall. In Ireland, most dolmens are found on the west coast, particularly in Connemara and the Burren, which includes some of the better-known examples, such as Poulnabrone dolmen. Examples such as the Annadorn dolmen have also been found in Northern Ireland, where they may have co-existed with the court cairn tombs.

In Mecklenburg and Pomerania/Pomorze in Germany and Poland, and in Drenthe in the Netherlands, large numbers of these graves were disturbed when harbours, towns, and cities were built. The boulders were used in construction and road building. Others, such as the Harhoog, in Sylt, were moved to new locations. There are still many thousands left today in Europe.

By 2017, all the hunebedden in the Netherlands were put in a 3D atlas (accessible to the public for free) using photogrammetry. The data was obtained from a collaboration between the Province of Drenthe and the University of Groningen, subsidized by the Gratama Foundation.

In Turkey, there are some dolmens in the Regions of Lalapasa and Suloglu in the Province of Edirne and the Regions of Kofçaz, Kırklareli and Demirköy in the Province of Kırklareli, in the Eastern Thrace. They have been studied by Prof. Dr. Engin Beksaç, since 2004. And also, some of so-called monuments are in the different regions of Anatolia, in Turkey.

=== Sites ===
- Bulgaria: There are interesting dolmens in the regions related to the Sakar and Rhodope and Strandzha Mountains in Bulgaria. There is also a dolmen in Horë-Vranisht, Albania. It is locally known as "Guri me qiell" ("Stone in the sky") or "Sofra e Zotit" ("Table of the God").
- Channel Islands: Many examples appear on the Channel Islands of Jersey and Guernsey, such as Déhus Dolmen, La Pouquelaye de Faldouet, La Sergenté, and La Hougue des Géonnais. The term Houge derives from the Old Norse word haugr, meaning a mound or barrow. The most famous of these sites is La Hougue Bie, a 6,000-year-old neolithic site that sits inside a large mound; later a chapel was built on the top of the mound.
- France: In France important megalithic zones are situated in Vendée, Quercy and in the south of France (Languedoc, Rouergue and Corsica). Amongst the vast Neolithic collections of the Carnac stones in Brittany, several dozen dolmens are found. Across the country, several dolmens still stand, such as the ones of Passebonneau and des Gorces near Saint-Benoît-du-Sault.
- Ireland: The largest dolmen in Europe is the Brownshill Dolmen in County Carlow, Ireland. Its capstone weighs about 150 tonnes.

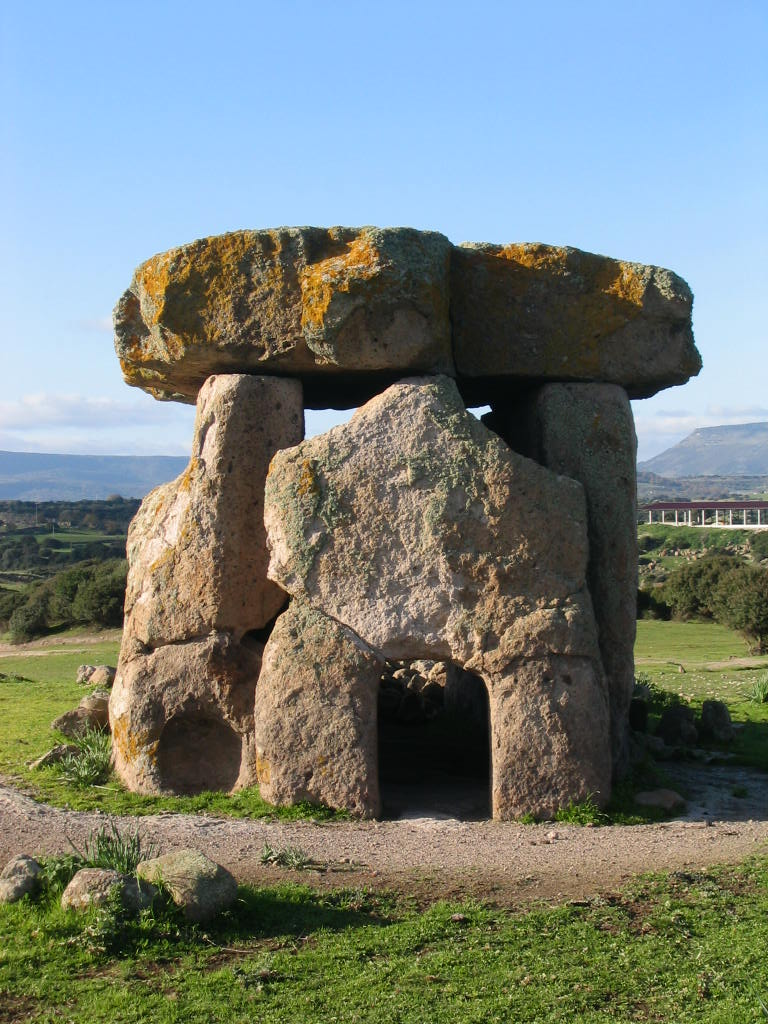
Dolmen Sa Coveccada Mores (Sardinia)

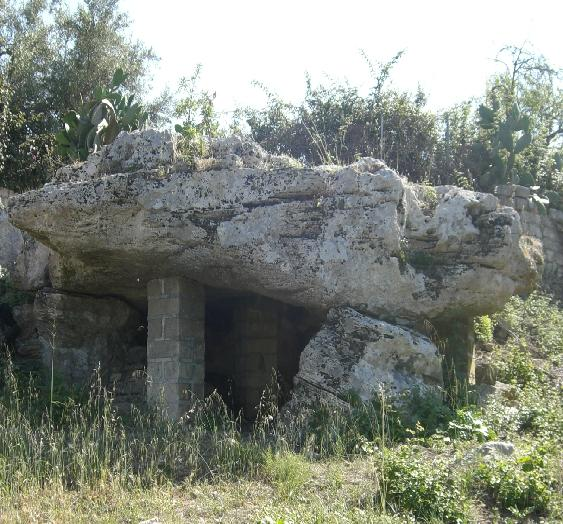
Pseudo-Dolmen of Avola (Syracuse district), Sicily

- Italy: In Italy dolmens can be found in Apulia, Sardinia and in Sicily. In this latter region there are small dolmens located in Mura Pregne (Palermo), Sciacca (Agrigento), Monte Bubbonia (Caltanissetta), Butera (Caltanissetta), Cava dei Servi (Ragusa), Cava Lazzaro (Siracusa), Avola (Siracusa). In the area named Cava dei Servi was found an atypical dolmen, away from the trilithic characteristic shape; it's a semi-oval monument formed by four rectangular slabs fixed into the ground. Another three slabs are on top, leaning in such a way they reduce the surface and form a false dome; two large parallelepiped boulders complete the construction.
- The Netherlands: 54 dolmens are found in the country's Northeast, 52 of them in the province of Drenthe and 2 in the adjacent province of Groningen. Dolmens D7 and D8 are protected by the Strubben-Kniphorstbos archaeological reserve.
- Portugal: Dolmens can be found across Portugal, ranging from simple ones to more complex examples of megalithic architecture, such as the Almendres Cromlech or the Anta Grande do Zambujeiro.
- Spain: In Spain dolmens can be found in Galicia (such as Axeitos), Basque Country and Navarre (like the Sorgin Etxea) and the Basque name for them is trikuharri or jentiletxe, Aragon (one of the areas with the highest density of dolmens, like the Dolmen de Tella), Catalonia (like Cova d'en Daina or Creu d'en Cobertella), Andalusia (like the Cueva de Menga) and Extremadura (like "Dolmen de Lácara").
- Sweden: There are a few dolmens in Sweden, for instance Ansarve dolmen in Gotland.
- United Kingdom: There are many dolmens in the United Kingdom, such as Pentre Ifan, Tinkinswood, and St Lythans burial chamber in Wales, Spinsters' Rock and Dartmoor kistvaens in Devon, and Lanyon Quoit in Cornwall.

== America ==
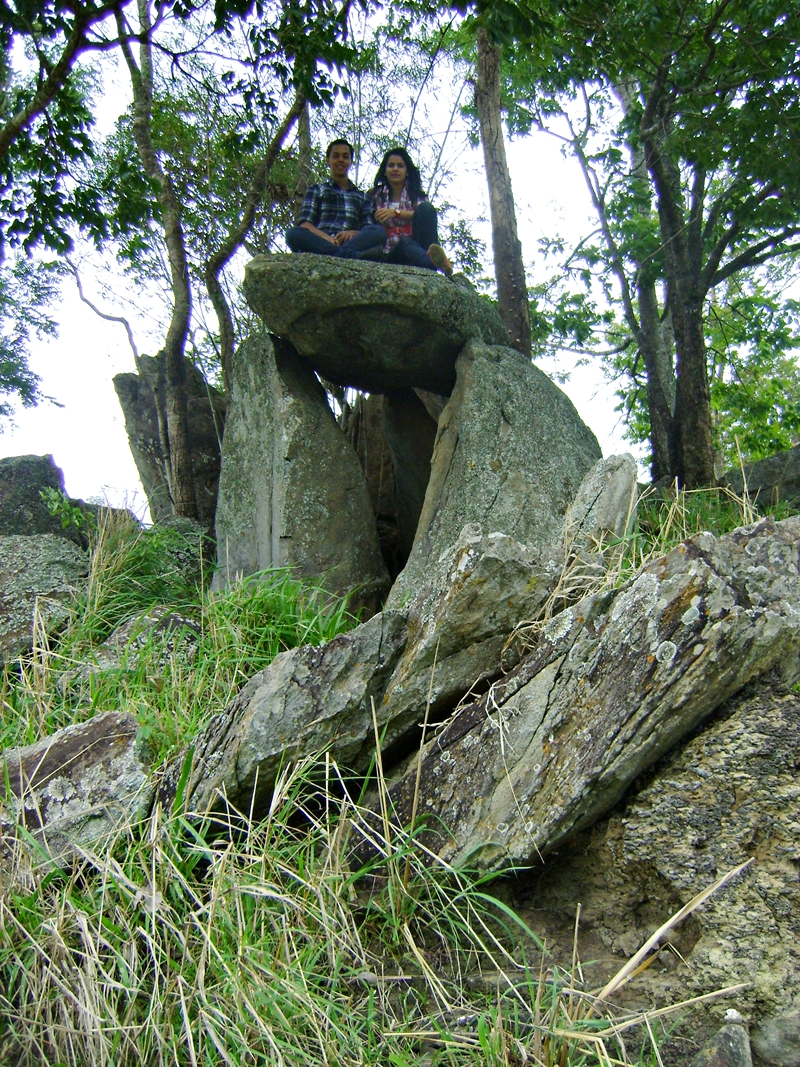
Anicus dolmen

=== North America ===
- America's Stonehenge
- Huron Mountain
- Tizer Dolmen

=== South America ===
- San Agustín Archaeological Park
- Pedra da Santana
- Senador Pompeu
- Anicus, Brazil

== See also ==
- List of archaeological sites by country
- List of archaeoastronomical sites by country
- List of colossal sculpture in situ
- World Heritage Sites
