= Gochang, Hwasun and Ganghwa Dolmen Sites =

UNESCO World Heritage Site in South Korea

UNESCO World Heritage Site
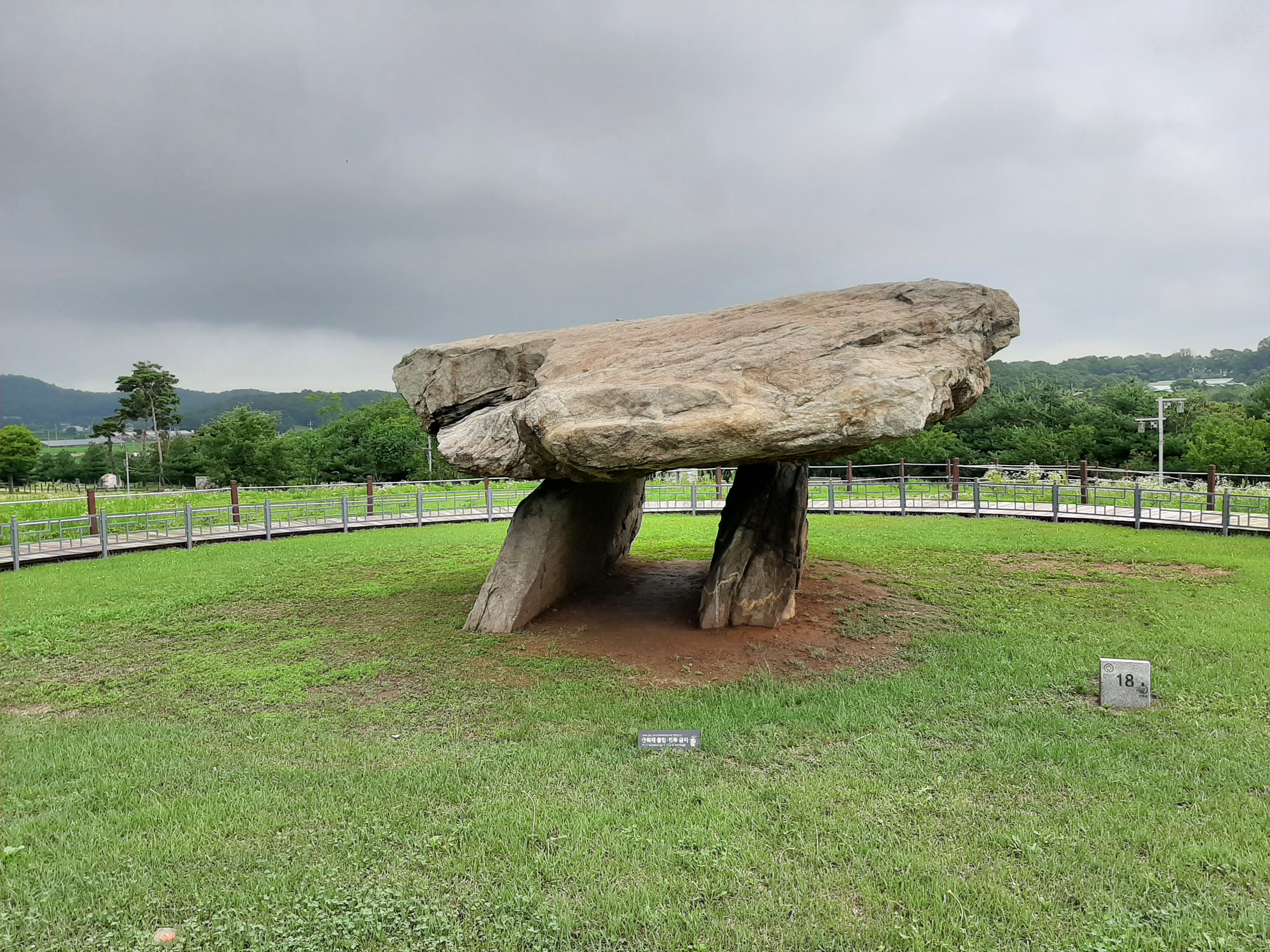
- Dolmen at Ganghwa Island
- Interactive map of Gochang, Hwasun and Ganghwa Dolmen Sites
- Location: South Korea
- Criteria: Cultural: (iii)
- Reference: 977
- Inscription: 2000 (24th Session)
- Extensions: 2017
- Area: 51.65 ha (127.6 acres)
- Buffer zone: 314.55 ha (777.3 acres)
- Dolmen sites: 1 = Gochang, 2 = Hwasun, 3 = Ganghwa

- Gochang, Hwasun and Ganghwa Dolmen Sites
- Hangul: 고창 화순 강화 고인돌 유적
- RR: Gochang Hwasun Ganghwa goindol yujeok
- MR: Koch'ang Hwasun Kanghwa koindol yujŏk

The Gochang, Hwasun and Ganghwa Dolmen Sites (Korean: 고창 화순 강화 고인돌 유적) are the location of hundreds of stone dolmens which were used as grave markers, and for ritual purposes during the first millennium BCE when the Megalithic Culture was prominent on the Korean Peninsula. The sites were designated as a World Heritage Site by UNESCO in 2000. The Korean Peninsula is home to over 35,000 dolmens, accounting for approximately 40% of the world's total; the Gochang, Hwasun, and Ganghwa sites are themselves home to over 1,000 dolmens.

The megalithic stones are invaluable because they mark the graves of the ruling elite. Pottery, comma-shaped jewels, bronzes, stone tools, and other funerary artifacts have been excavated from these dolmen. The culture of the people during this time can be gleaned from the evidence left by the dolmen. Additionally, it can be induced from the stones how the stone was quarried, transported, and used to build the dolmen.

Dolmen in Korea have been dated to the seventh century BCE in locations such as Gochang and the practice ended around the third century BCE. The dolmen culture is linked with the Neolithic and bronze cultures of Korea.

Excavation at the sites did not begin until 1965. Since then, multiple digs have been sponsored and an extensive program of inventory and preservation has been initiated by the Korean government.

== Origin theories ==
Three main theories exist regarding the origins of the Korean dolmens: 1) information about dolmens and their construction was transmitted via sea routes from Southeast Asia; 2) information about dolmens and their construction was transmitted from Neolithic peoples living north of the Korean Peninsula; and 3) dolmens in Korea originated from Neolithic civilizations on the Korean Peninsula.

=== Theorized transmission from Southeast Asia ===
According to this theory, information about dolmens and their construction spread from Southeast Asia along with rice culture. Many dolmens on the Korean Peninsula are distributed along Korea's western coastline, especially in the south of the peninsula, and this distribution could be consistent with transmission via migration from Southeast Asia.

=== Theorized spread from Northeast Asia ===
This theory postulates that Neolithic peoples in present-day Manchuria and southern Siberia either brought dolmen and their construction information with them when migrating to the Korean Peninsula, or that such information was transmitted to Neolithic peoples already in Korea from other Neolithic groups in present-day Manchuria and southern Siberia. This theory relies at some other observations: the similarities in shape between dolmens in Korea and those in present-day Manchuria and southern Siberia and; the similarities in Bronze Age burial artifacts (see Liaoning bronze dagger culture) between those in Korea and those in present-day Manchuria; and the close connection between dolmens in present-day Manchuria and southern Siberia and the Bronze Age culture in those regions. However, the distribution of dolmens in present-day Manchuria and southern Siberia is much less concentrated than in Korea, which weakens this theory.

=== Theorized Korean origin ===
This theory is based on the facts that: Korean dolmens are the most concentrated of any in the world, and that Korea alone accounts for some 40% of all dolmens in the world; Korean dolmens are diverse in morphology and distinct from those in other parts of the world; and megalithic culture on the Korean Peninsula and its vicinity appears to have flourished extensively, with some dolmens depicting astronomical formations dated to 3000 BC, the reasons for which are currently unknown. This theory postulates that it is highly likely that the Neolithic and Bronze Age culture(s) of the Korean Peninsula and its vicinity developed a unique dolmen culture. In particular, the presence of two distinct styles of dolmen (Northern and Southern, their distribution limits roughly corresponding to the course of the Bukhan River) suggests that Korea's geographic location may have provided easy access for the Neolithic/Bronze Age peoples of Korea to dolmen cultures from multiple regions, influencing the development of a unique dolmen culture.

== Description ==
Dolmens are generally classified as two types in East Asia. The table/northern-type and the go-board/southern-type. In the former, four stones were positioned to make the walls of a box and were capped by a stone which lay on top of the supports. The latter is characterized by underground burial with stones that supported the capstone.

=== Gochang Dolmen Site ===
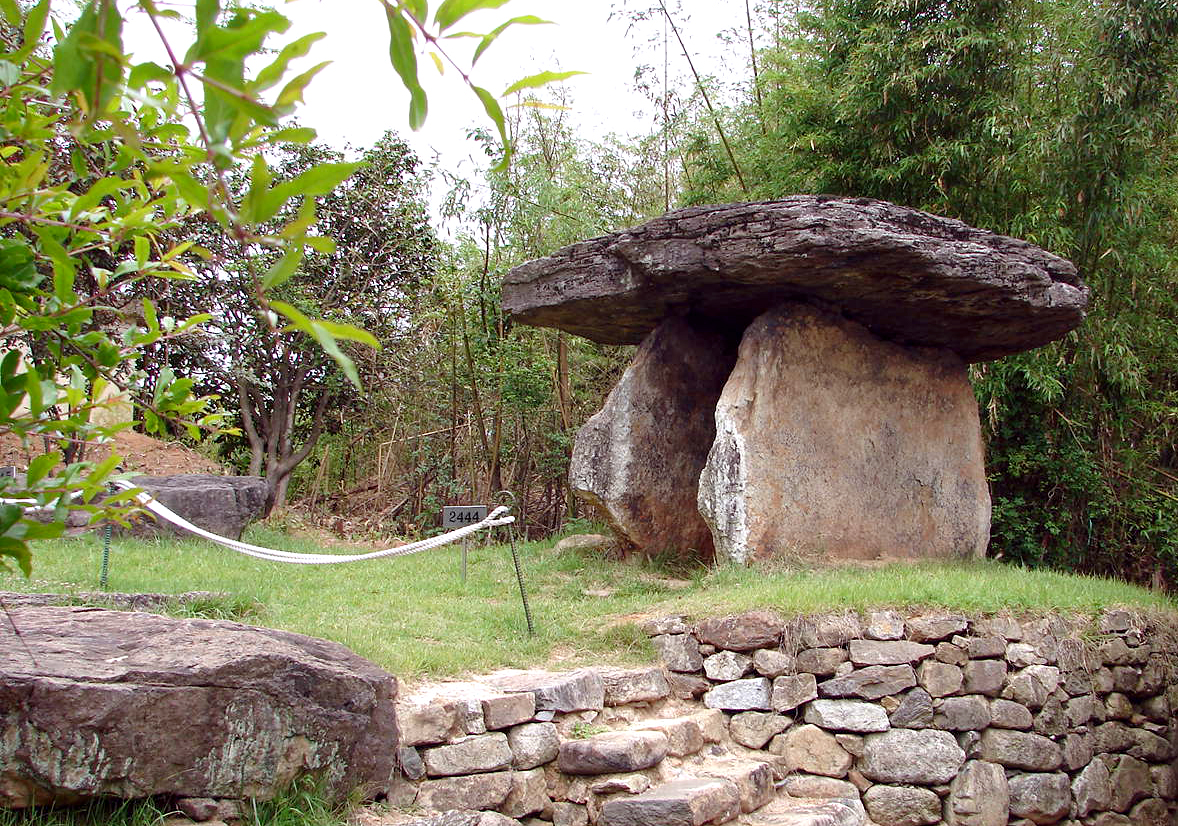
One of the tallest Dolmens at Gochang Dolmen site

This site of dolmens contains the largest and most varied group. They are known as the Jungnim-ri dolmens and are centered in Maesan village, Gochang County, North Jeolla province.

The dolmens were built from east to west at the foot of a series of hills at an altitude of 15 to 50 meters (49 to 164 feet). Generally, the capstones of the dolmens are around 1 to 5.8 meters (3.3 to 19.0 feet) in length and may weigh up to 225 tons. 442 dolmens have been documented and classified based on the size of the capstone.

This group is believed to have been constructed around the seventh century BCE. The Gochang Dolmen Site is listed as Historic Site #391.

=== Hwasun Dolmen Sites ===
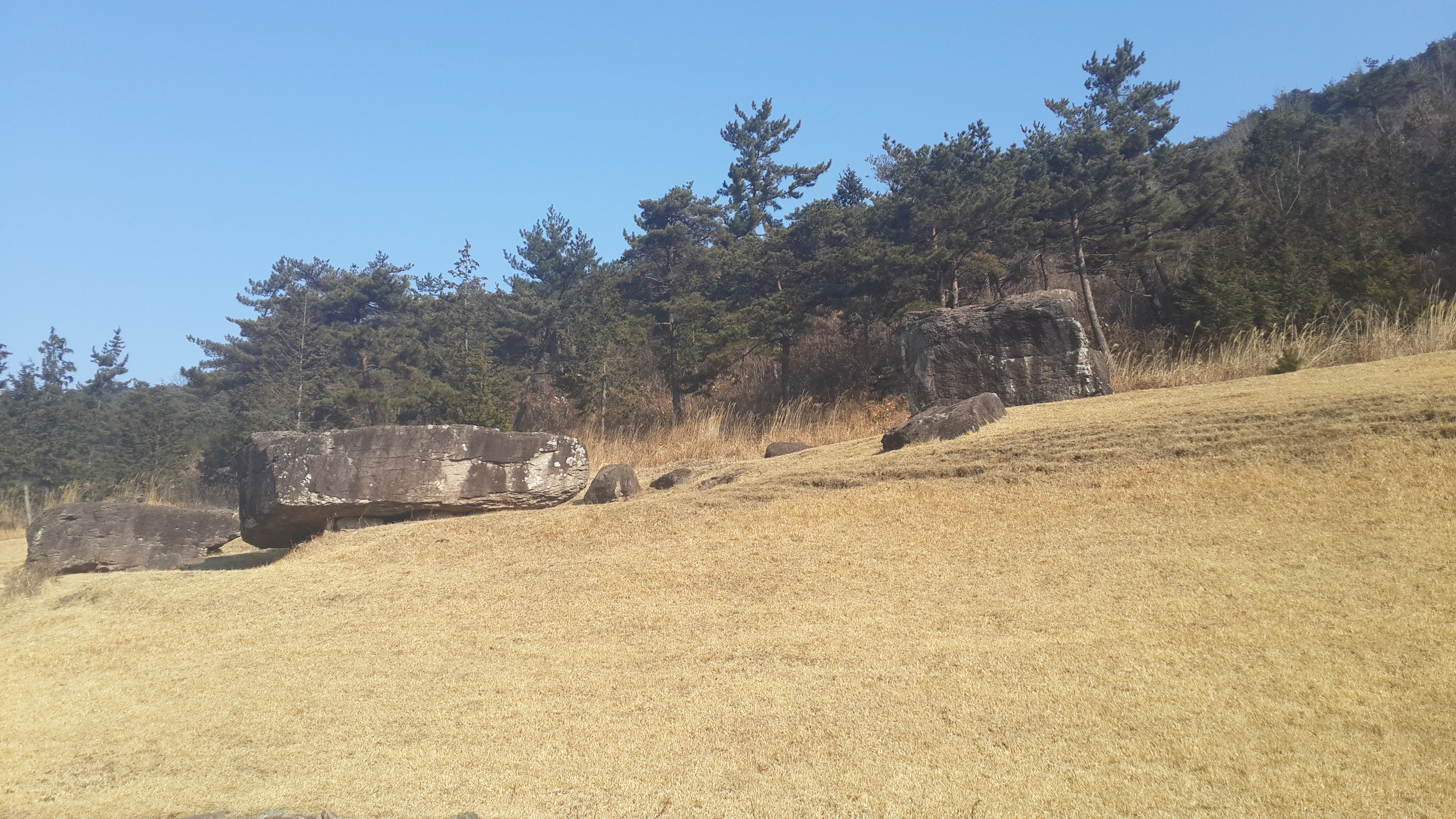
Dolmens at Hwasun Dolmen Site

Hwasun Dolmen site is located in the valleys around the Jiseokgang River, which connects Hyosan-ri, Dogok-myeon, and Dasin-ri, Chunyang-myeon. The dolmen scattered around Hyosan-ri, Dogok-myeon is estimated to be the dolmen of 135 out of a total of 980 stone structures. These dolmens are less well preserved than the Jungnim-ri group.

The dolmens of Hyosan-ri are estimated to have been exposed to at least 250 places, including those that have been quarried for building the dolmen. According to a survey, 124 out of 3,309 stone structures are estimated to be dolmen.

The typical characteristic of Hwasun Dolmen is 596 dolmens in a small area, and the largest statue in Korea is located in Daesin-ri, Chunyang-myeon. The tomb is 7.3 meters long, 5.0 meters wide, and 4.0 meters thick, and weighs 280 tons. The largest dolmen in Hyosan-ri, Dogok-myeon, is 5.3 meters long, 3.6 meters wide, and 3.0 meters thick, which is estimated to be more than 100 tons.

The Hwasun Dolmen Site is listed as Historic Site #410. The Hwasun Dolmen site was registered as World Heritage No. 997 with Gochang and Ganghwa Dolmen on December 2, 2000.

=== Ganghwa Dolmen Sites ===
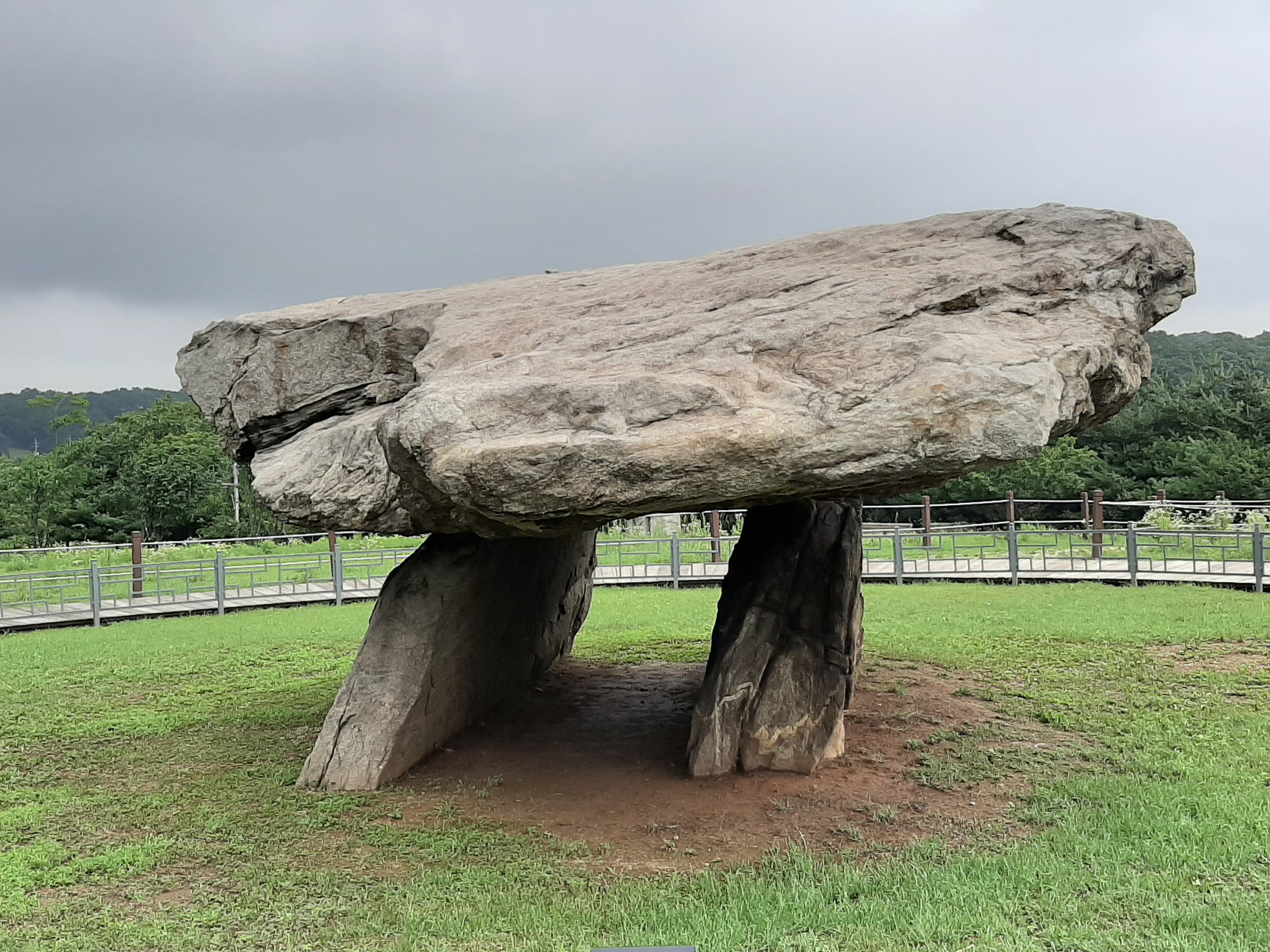
An example of a go-board/southern-type dolmen on Ganghwa Island

These dolmens are located on Ganghwa Island, Ganghwa County, Incheon. They are situated on the slopes of mountains and are thus higher in elevation than their counterparts. These dolmens are believed to be the earliest ones made because the dolmen groups in Bugeun-ri (부근리, in Hajeom-myeon) and Gocheon-ri (고천리, in Naega-myeon) resemble the early dolmens. However, this has not been conclusively proved.

Ganghwa Island is a place rich in mountains and water and early ruling groups were formed to make dolmen. Also, there are about 150 dolmens in abundance, which is good for making dolmen. The distribution map of the dolmen shows that the dolmens were closely related to fishing in the Bronze Age, although they are now separated from the sea.

A notable dolmen at Ganghwa is a northern/table-type dolmen, where it was believed that ancestral rites were performed. It is the biggest stone in South Korea with measures of 2.6 × 7.1 × 5.5 meters, but it only has two supporting stones. Combined, the supporting stones and the capstone weigh between 150 and 225 tons.

It was designated as Historic Site No. 137 as one of the representative tombs of the Bronze Age. A large stone measuring 710 cm long, 260 cm high, and 550 cm wide was used, and the shape of the stone is a northern type of dolmen, making it a good source of research on ancient history. The Ganghwa Dolmen site was registered as a World Heritage Site along with Gochang and Hwasun at the 24th UNESCO World Heritage Committee in Cairns, Australia on November 29, 2000.

== Other Korean dolmens ==
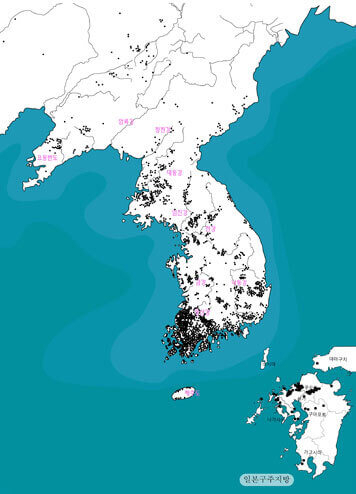
Dolmen mар in Korea

Dolmens in South Korea are mostly concentrated in South Jeolla Province. By region, there are 338 in Gangwon Province, 502 in Gyeonggi Province, 189 in North Chungcheong Province, 1597 in North Jeolla Province, 10,068 in South Jeolla Province, 2,800 in North Gyeongsang Province, and 140 in Jeju Province.

Recently, a large number of sites were discovered in Chuncheon, Gangwon-do, and 101 more dolmens were added to Korea's already-lengthy list of dolmens.

Sansuri, Yulchon-myeon, Yeosu, Jeollanam-do, is home to a dolmen presumed to be the largest in the world.

Seoul and its metropolitan area is believed to have, at one time, been home to a large number of dolmens, which would be consistent with the higher concentration of dolmens in western Korea. However, in the process of rapid urban development, many dolmens are believed to have been lost. Dolmens existed in Jeongneung-dong, Gaepo-dong Daemo mountain, Umyun-dong, Yangjae-dong, Wonji-dong, and Gocheok-dong. Among them, the dolmens in Won Ji-dong were discovered with related artifacts in 1984 but most of them are now believed to have been destroyed due to a lack of government protections (in the form of protective facilities, signs, and cultural property designations).

== Roles of dolmen ==
Although there were many controversies over the function of the dolmen on the Korean Peninsula, it was confirmed that the stone was made for the purpose of the tomb in 1967 when the complete human bones were discovered at Hwangseok-ri Dolmen in Jecheon, North Chungcheong Province.

However, some argue that the tomb was not just a function of the tomb. Although there is no objection to the fact that the tomb functioned as a tomb, some argue that the stone was made as a function of an altar or tombstone in addition to the tomb. Claiming the function of the altar, the table dolmen might have served as an altar rather than a tomb, citing the fact that they are located higher than the surrounding area so that people can easily see, and the appearance of grandeur on the pedestal, and the structure of the pedestal, which is difficult to form a tomb.

In addition, in the case of a group of dolmen, sometimes the dolmen can be seen to be unusually large or different in direction than other dolmens, which is presumed to be a simple function that was built to reveal the authority and prestige of the tomb-building group.

== Cadaver and status ==
Examples of human bones excavated from the dolmen site are Hwangseok-ri in Jecheon, North Chungcheong Province, Chuncheon in Gangwon Province, Jincheon-dong in Daegu, and Daepyeong-ri in Jinyang, South Gyeongsang Province. The discovery of human bones provides an insight into the funeral customs during the construction of the dolmen, and also provides information on the thought and religious aspects of the time.

In particular, the Hwangseok-ri dolmen skeleton is almost perfect, about 176 centimeters tall, and the skull shape differs from that of today's Koreans, but it has yet to be confirmed whether it is a common form or personal difference.

The claim that the person buried in the dolmen is a tomb of a powerful ruler, such as a tribal chief, is gaining credence. There are also various other claims, including the tomb of the ruler and his family, the joint tomb of a blood-related group, and the tomb of the person who made a contribution in the war.

== See also ==
- History of Korea
- List of dolmens
- List of largest monoliths
