= Hirapur dolmen =

Historic site in Chandrapur district, Maharashtra

Hirapur Dolmen
- हिरापूर मांडवगोटा (Marathi)
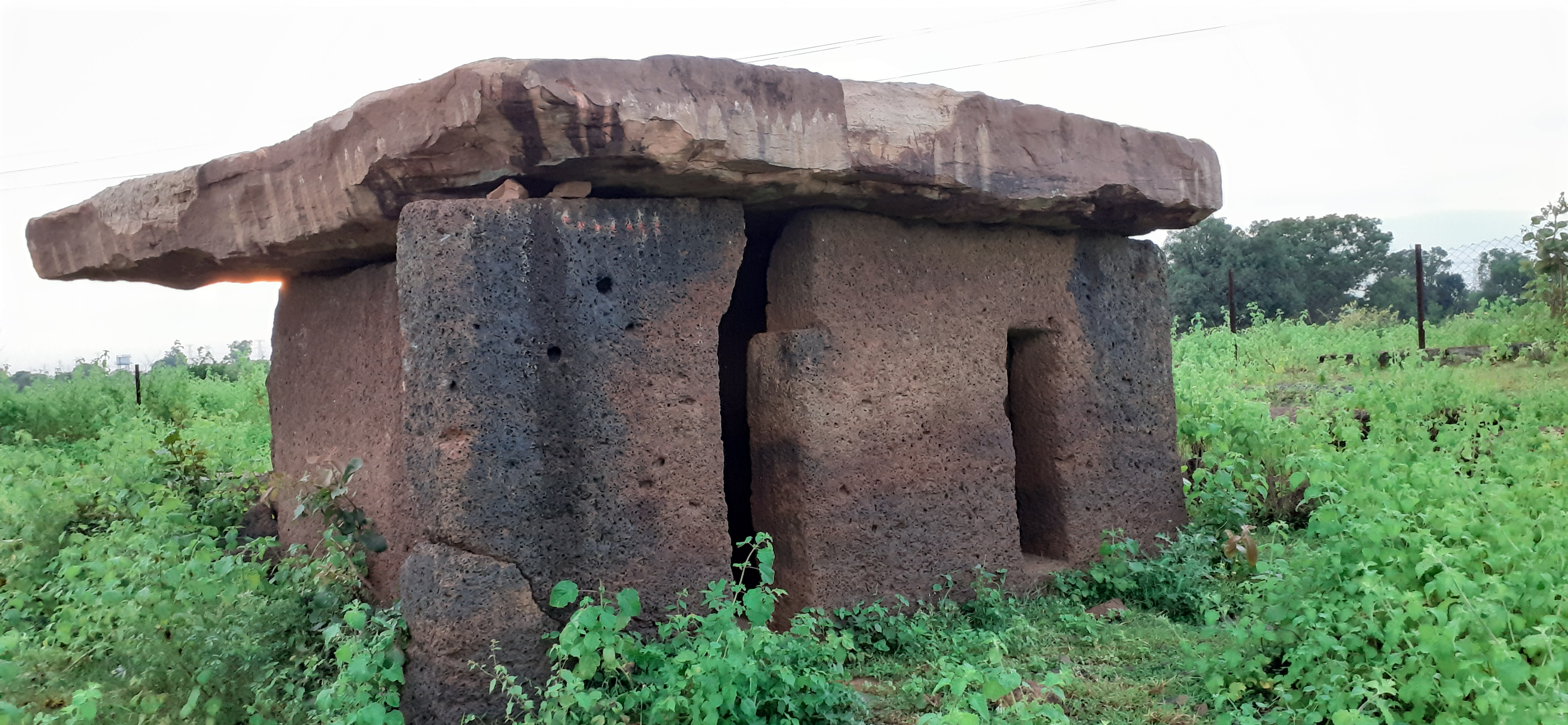
- Hirapur dolmen in September 2021

- Location within Maharashtra
- 20.6236°N 79.5297°E
- Location: Chandrapur district, Maharashtra.

Hirapur dolmens (Marathi: हिरापूर मांडवगोटा), dating back to 2nd-3rd century BC asmaka mahajanapadas or satavahana dynasty era, are 4 dolmens (burial chambers) made of megalithic (large stones) laterite (type of stone) in the general area of Hirapur village on NH-930 in Chimur tehsil of Chandrapur district of Maharashtra.

This site, first studied in 2012, is very important at it is likely the largest dolmen in India, first ever dolmen in the world with evidence of iron and iron smelting, first ever dolmen in the region found with dual use of worship and burial both since most other are burial alone, and site selection shows detailed planning, there is evidence of royal burial, and its current usage as cremation ground shows thousands of years of continuing practice of last rites at same site by the tribal, all of these make it a unique and very important heritage site. Since 2012, experts have been demanding protection and preservation of this site. It is rated among India's 10 most underrated archaeological discoveries. Yet, presently site is unprotected with no preservation action by the government.

The site is north of the Muktabai hills near Hirapur, currently in use as cremation ground by the villagers of Hirapur and nearby villages.

== Location ==
Dolmen are in the general vicinity of Hirapur village. Hirapur is on NH-930. It 60 km east of district HQ, 80 km southeast of taluka HQ Chimur, 167 km southeast of Nagpur, 180 km southeast of Wardha, 390 km northeast of Hyderabad, 640 northwest of Visakhapatnam and 860 km east of Mumbai.

== Background ==
Area around Chandrapur is littered with several ancient archaeological rocks, ancient rocks dating back to 8000 BCE could be viewed at the Suresh Chopane Rock Museum in Tadoba.

There are competing and contrasting theories about the origin of megalithic people, according to one they migrated from West Asia to South India before arriving in Vidarbha, while rival theory claims they originated in Vidarbha and migrated to south. Maharashtra has numerous megalithic sites. The in megaliths found in south Maharashtra are of varied types, such as head stones alone, or rock chambers and even dolmen. Megaliths in Vidarbha regions are burial sites marked by stone circles.

In Vidharba, the Naikund, Mahurjhari, Borgaon 40 km southwest of Nagpur and Khairwada 80 km west of Nagpur megalithic sites have been excavated. Important megalithic sites of Vidarbha are Hirapur dolmens, Stone circles of Junapani sepulchral megaliths 10 kilometres northwest of Nagpur, Mahurjhari Stone Circles with are 200 megalithic stone circles 15 km northwest of Nagpur, Naikund with evidence of iron smelting 35 km north of Nagpur, and Takalghat Khapa 34 km south of Nagpur.

== History ==
It was first studied, sometime prior and close to 2012, by the Deccan College Post-Graduate and Research Institute by a team under the supervision of assistant professor Kantikumar A Pawar.

== Details of finds ==
=== Site selection and usage ===
North side of the site is flanked by an 11 meter long U-shaped laterite hillock, which runs north of the site, then turns west, then to south again which serves as a U-shape protective wall around the site, this is the first ever such unique site selection feature has been found in the Indian subcontinent. All this shows detailed planning and deep reverence for the dead. This site is still being used by the villagers as a cremating ground, which shows long continuity of the tradition of giving last rites to the dead at the same place. This likely first site in the region not used for burial alone but also for worship.

=== 4 dolemens ===
The details of 4 dolmens studied, one is intact and 3 are in ruined state, are as follows: The largest of these dolmen is non-sepulchral (not used for burial) and others 3 are sepulchral (burial chambers).

- 1st the largest dolmen is intact, made of laterite and sandstone, 10 feet high standing stones and 17 feet by 15 feet in size capstone weighing 80 ton, 2 separate chambers with rectangle port holes for making offerings, artifacts found include glass and copper bangles, stone celt, pot shards. This dolmen is guarded by stone wall made of laterite stones. This dolmen was used for worship, and not for burial. Megalithic people believed in afterlife and offerings were made to dead at these dolmen. Usually dolmen have small circular windows, but this dolmen have large rectangular windows, for making offerings of food and other items. The artifacts found with each dolmen are signs of offerings being made. This is perhaps the largest dolmen in India.
- 2nd and 3rd dolmen are smaller, semi ruined with capstone intact, each with 2 chambers, artifacts found include iron ore and pot shards. These were found with iron and iron ore residue, which shows there were iron smelters in the area, this is first ever find in/with dolmen of iron and iron smelting.
- 4th dolmen has capstone missing. It has a single chamber only and floor made of 7 laterite stones arranged in east west direction. Artifacts found include iron ore and pot shards. Inside the dolmen chamber, in the west corner above the dressed stones of the floor a large collection of ceramics was found. In northeastern corner, a punch marked coin, with "Three-arch hill" embossed on it, was found which indicated the person buried there was some kind of royalty.

== Concerns ==
This is an unprotected site, there are concerns of disappearance. There is no conservation action being undertaken.

In 2012, given the cultural and rich archaeological importance of this site the archaeologists have been asking to urgently preserve this site which is one of its kind, "In fact, one of the double-chambered megaliths found is still worshiped by a tribal community.". As of 2021 this was still unprotected with no efforts done to preserve it. There is a need to conduct detailed scientific study, map the area, fence it, post a guard, build research and visitor facilities as well as an interpretation centre.

== See also ==
- List of dolmens in India
- Archaeology in India
- List of Indus Valley Civilisation sites
- List of archaeological sites by country#India
- Timeline of Indian history
- World Heritage Sites by country#India
