= Maktorion =

Ancient Greek town on Sicily

Maktorion or Mactorium (Ancient Greek: Μακτώριον), was an ancient town of Magna Graecia in Sicily, in the neighborhood of Gela.

Stephanus of Byzantium, who cites it from Philistus, mention that the town was founded by Monon (Μόνων). Herodotus, tells us that some Geloan citizens banished to Mactorium and Telines (Τηλίνης), an ancestor of Gelon, succeeded in restoring them back to Gela, on the condition that his descendants should be ministering priests of the underworld gods/goddesses.

The only clue to its position is that afforded by Herodotus, who calls it a city above Gela, by which he must mean further inland. Cluverius conjectures that it may have occupied the site of Butera, a town on a hill about 13 km inland from Gela, (Cluver. Sicil. p. 363), the editors of the Barrington Atlas of the Greek and Roman World place Maktorion at the ruins and archaeological site at Monte Bubbonia in the modern comune of Mazzarino, Province of Caltanissetta.
