= Monte Bubbonia =

Mountain in Italy

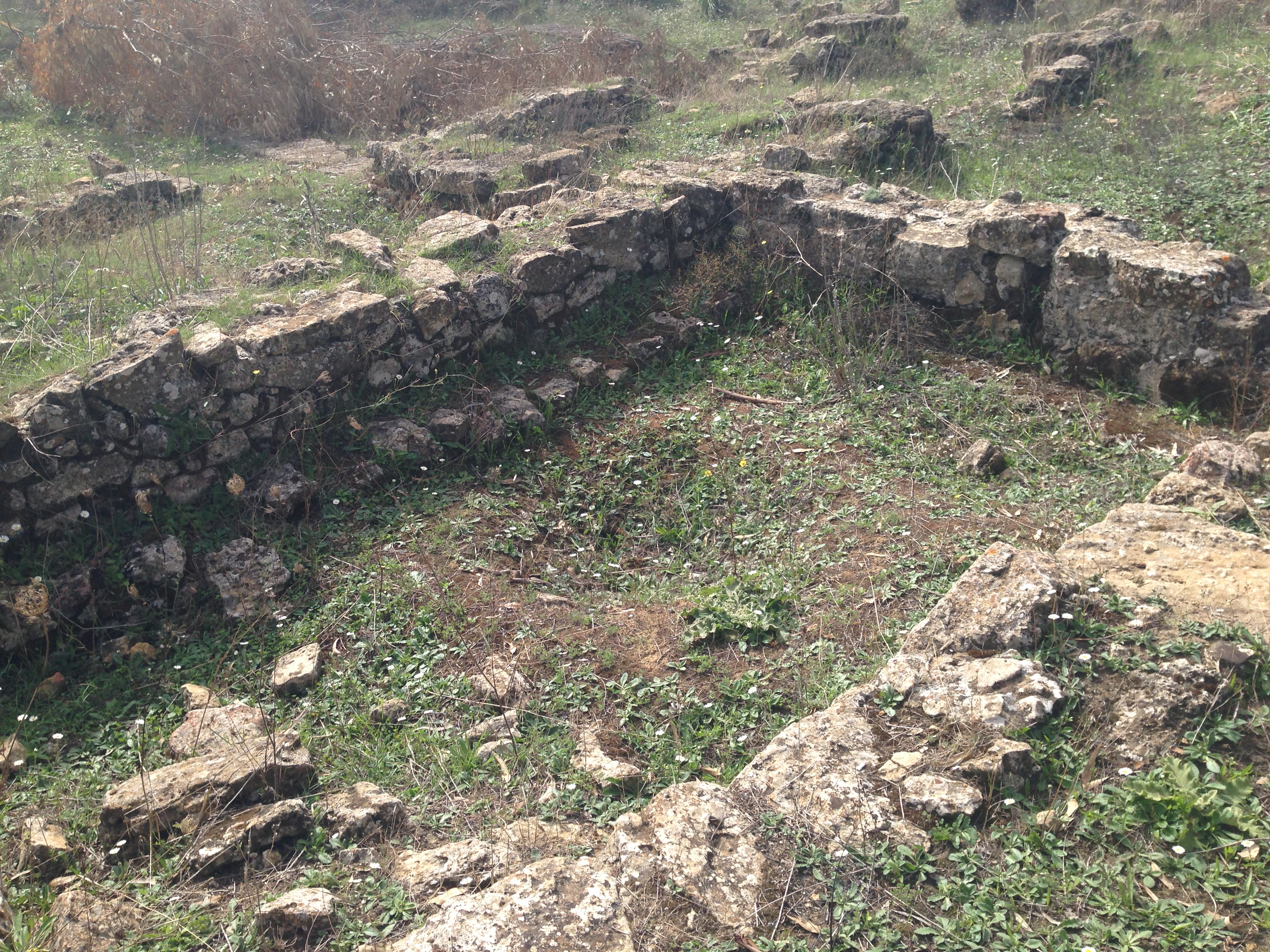
- Remains of the ancient settlement

- Location within Sicily
- 37°15′6.93″N 14°20′25.25″E
- Type: settlement
- Periods: 6th century BC
- Cultures: Sicans, Greeks
- Location: Caltanissetta, Sicily, Italy

Site notes
- Elevation: 595 m (1,952 ft)
- Archaeologists: Paolo Orsi, Piero Orlandini
- Public access: yes

Monte Bubbonìa is a 595-metre-high (1,952 ft) hill located in the comune of Mazzarino, about twenty kilometres from the city of Gela. It consists of three platforms, descending from west to east (i.e. the westernmost platform is also the highest).

The site is reached by travelling along the SS 117 Gela-Catania, taking the turn-off for Piazza Armerina, driving for 9-kilometre-high (5.6 mi), until a side road appears on the left, the old road to Mazzarino, marked by a sign which shows the street on an ancient Roman route map known as the Itinerarium Antonini.

The shape of the hill, from a geological point of view, is relatively recent, with the Miocene limestone base covered by Pleistocene marl with silt and quartz grains, then finally by very red sand which is very crumbly and dusty. Below the curb of a dirt road which runs up the east side of the hill towards the acropolis, there is a 2.2-metre-long (7.2 ft) chamber dolmen, the shape of which has similarities to structures in Sardinia and Apulia.

On the summit of the mountain, Paolo Orsi discovered an ancient city which the archaeologist Piero Orlandini later identified as the Sican settlement of Maktorion, known from Herodotus 7.53. However, the ruins do not seem to predate the 6th century BC, and this makes Orlandini's identification unlikely.

== Gallery ==
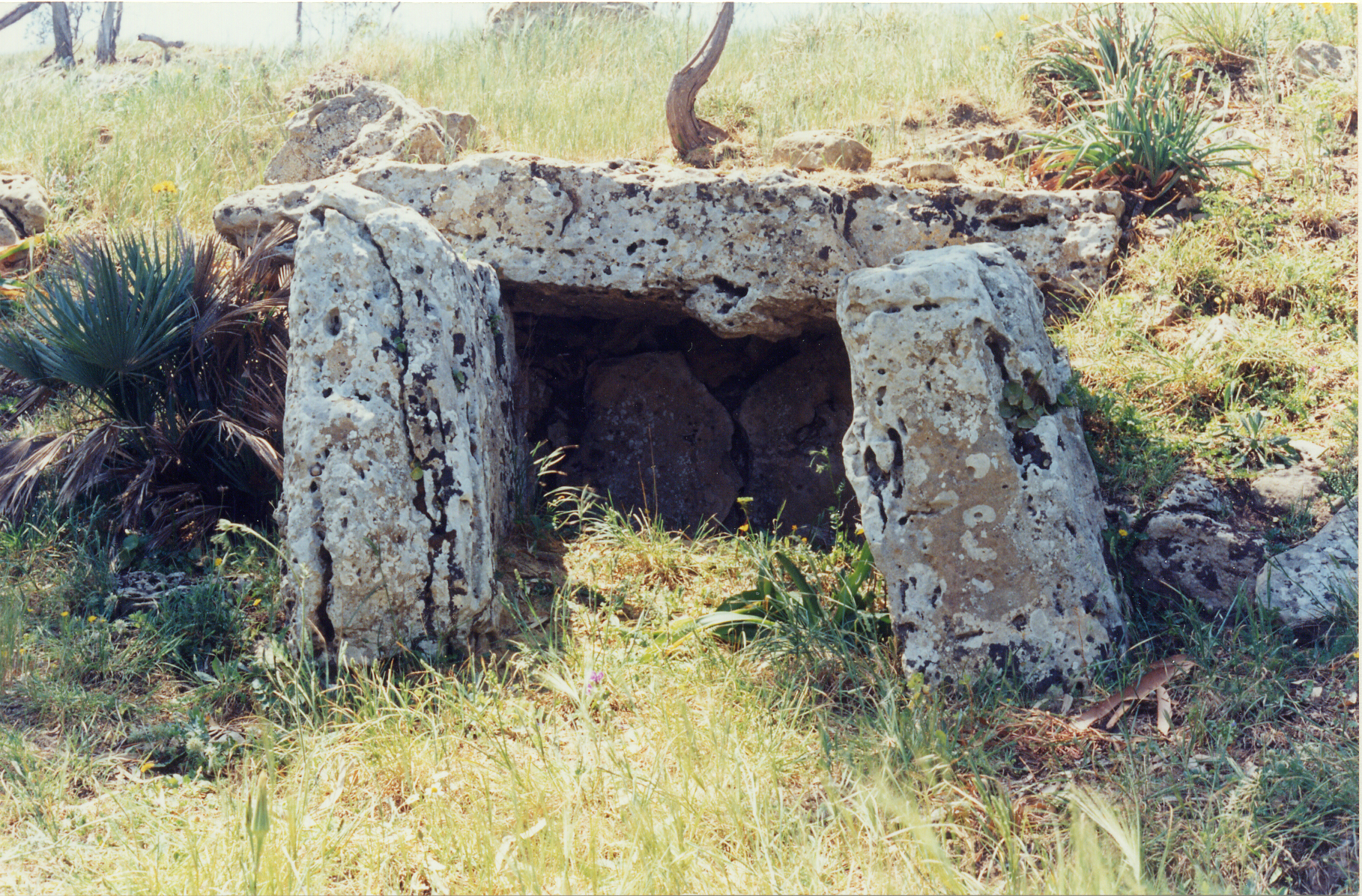
Dolmen

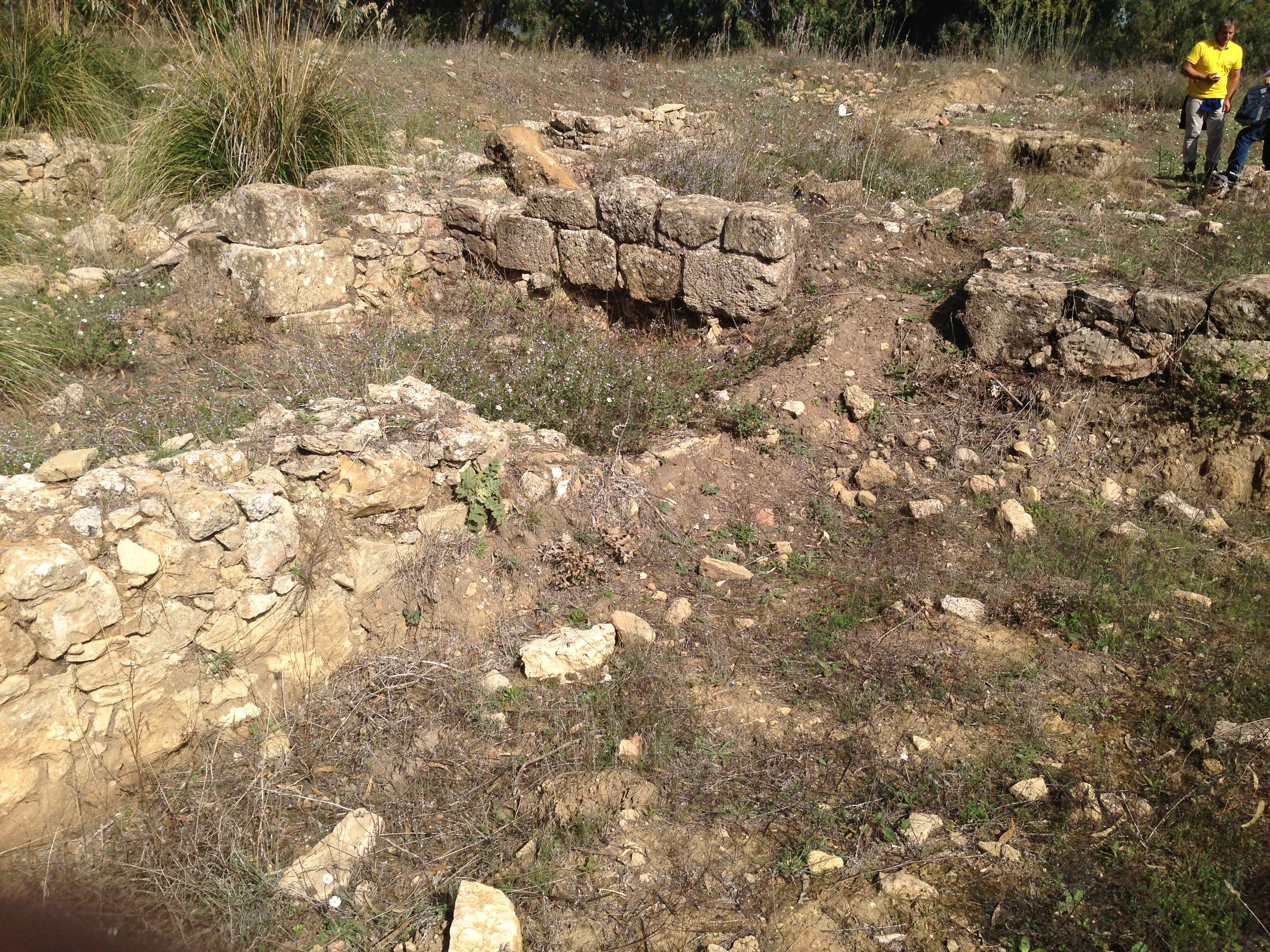

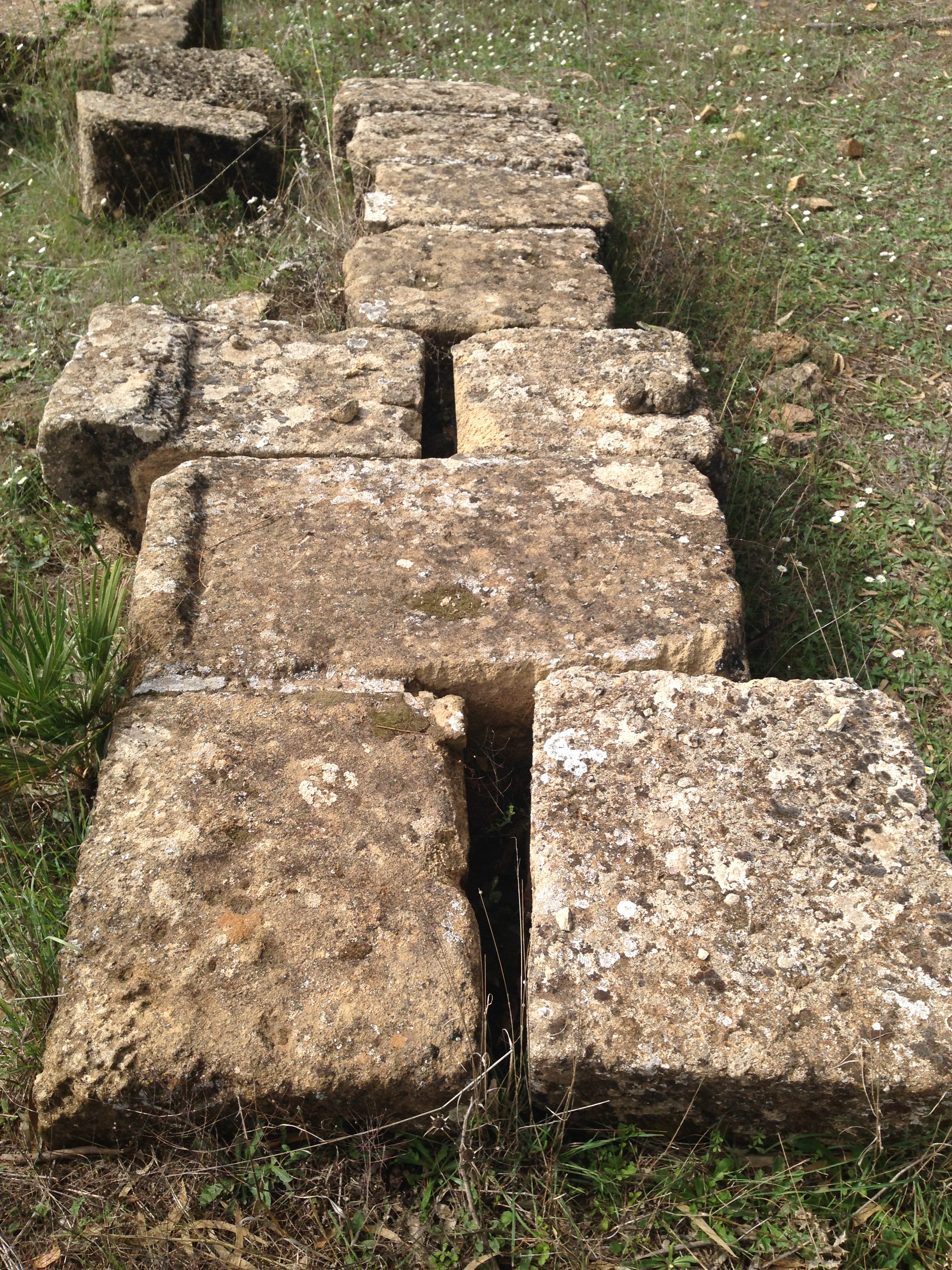

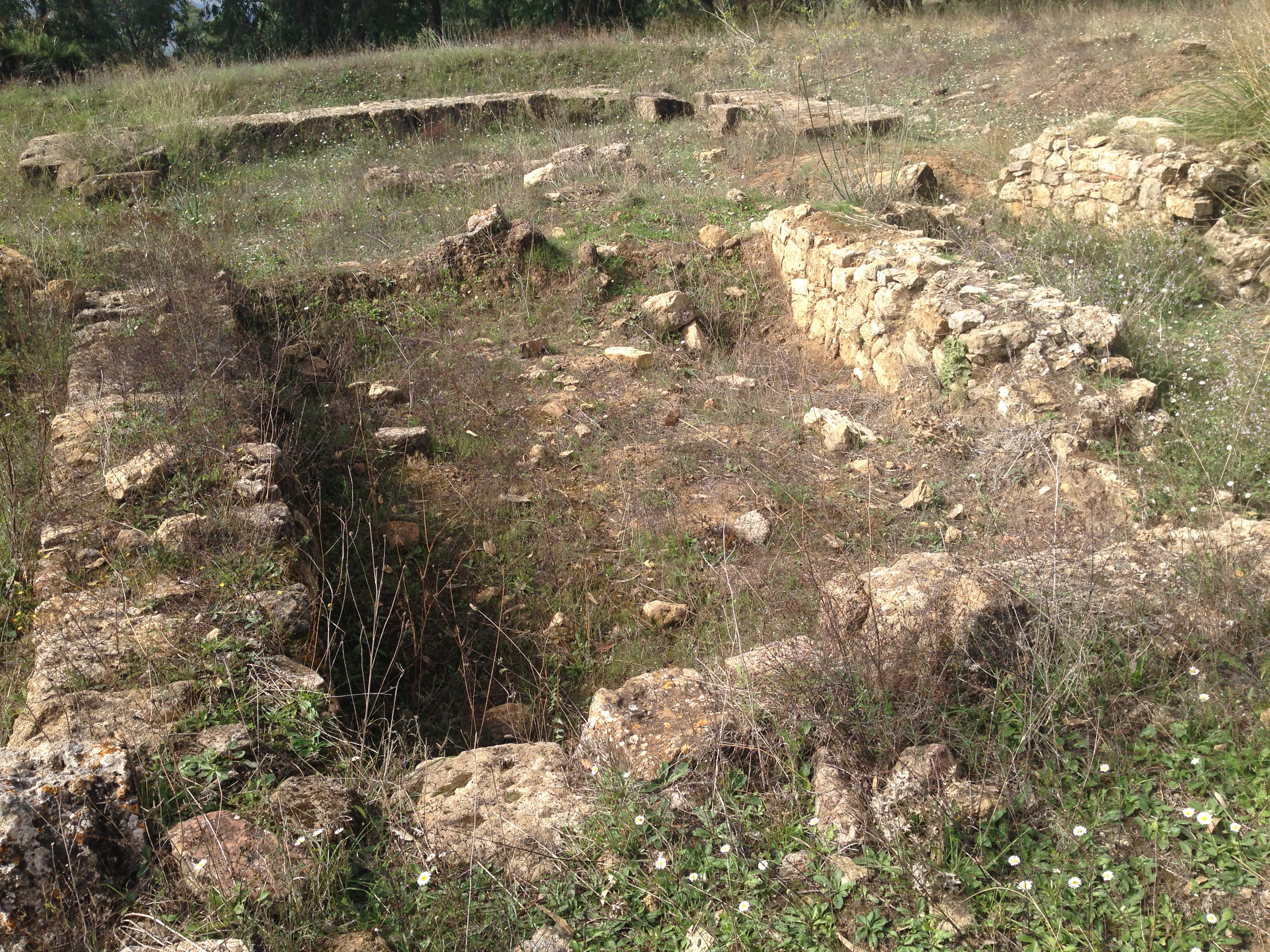

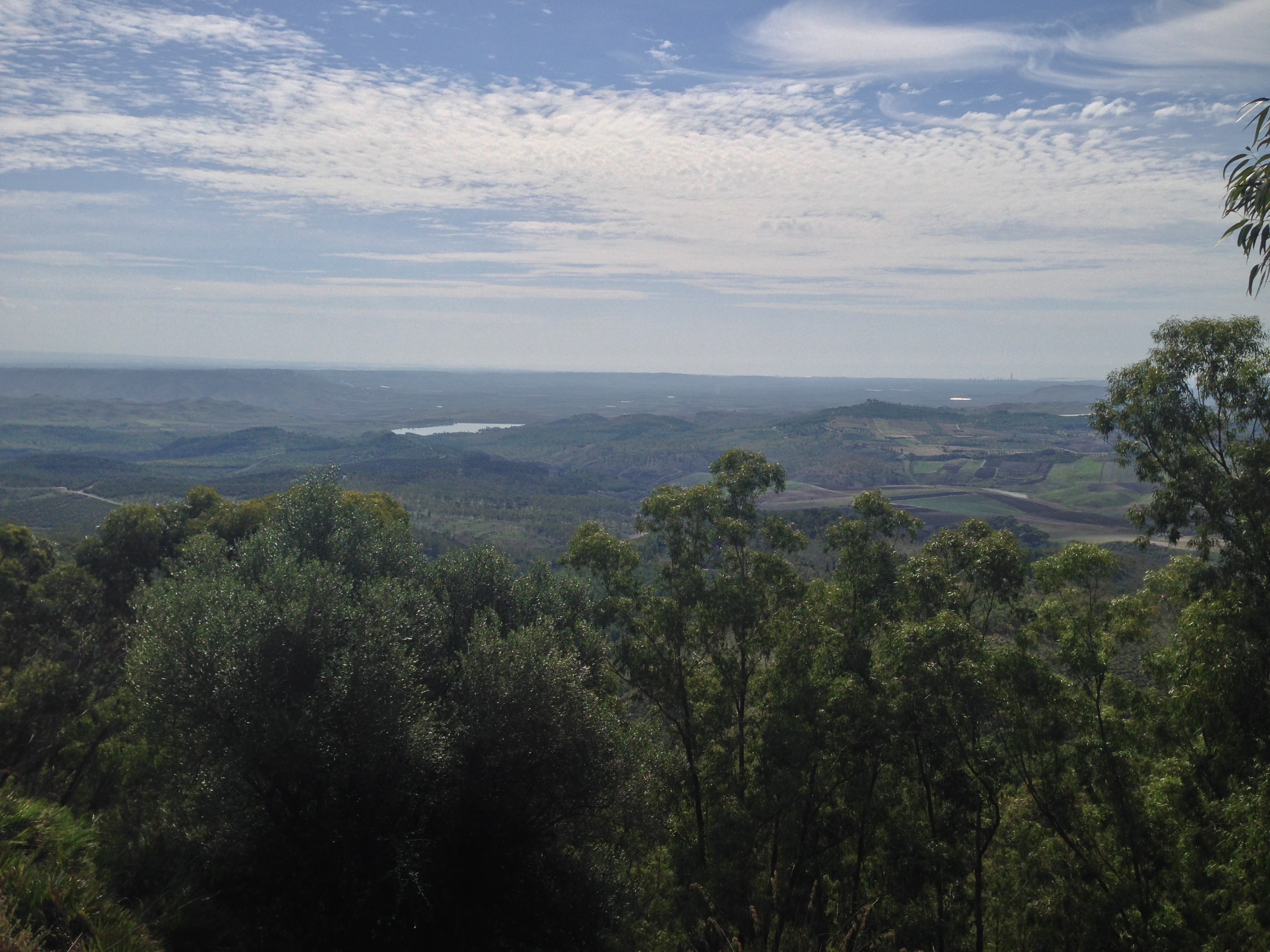
View looking south from Monte Bubbonia

== Bibliography ==
- Paolo Orsi - Domenico Pancucci, "Esplorazioni a Monte Bubbonia dal 1904 al 1906", in Archivio storico Siracusano, N.S. 2 (1972–73), pp. 5–60;
- D. Pancucci, "Monte Bubbonia. Scavi nel quadriennio 1972-75", in Kokalos, 22-23 (1976–77), pp. 470–478;
- D. Pancucci, "Monte Bubbonia. Scavi nella Necropoli", in Sicilia Archeologica,6.23 (1973), pp. 49–55;
- Salvatore Piccolo (2013), Ancient Stones: The Prehistoric Dolmens of Sicily, Brazen Head Publishing, Thornham/Norfolk (UK), ISBN 978-09-5651-062-4.
