= Cova d'en Daina =

Dolmen in Catalonia, Spain

Daina's Cave
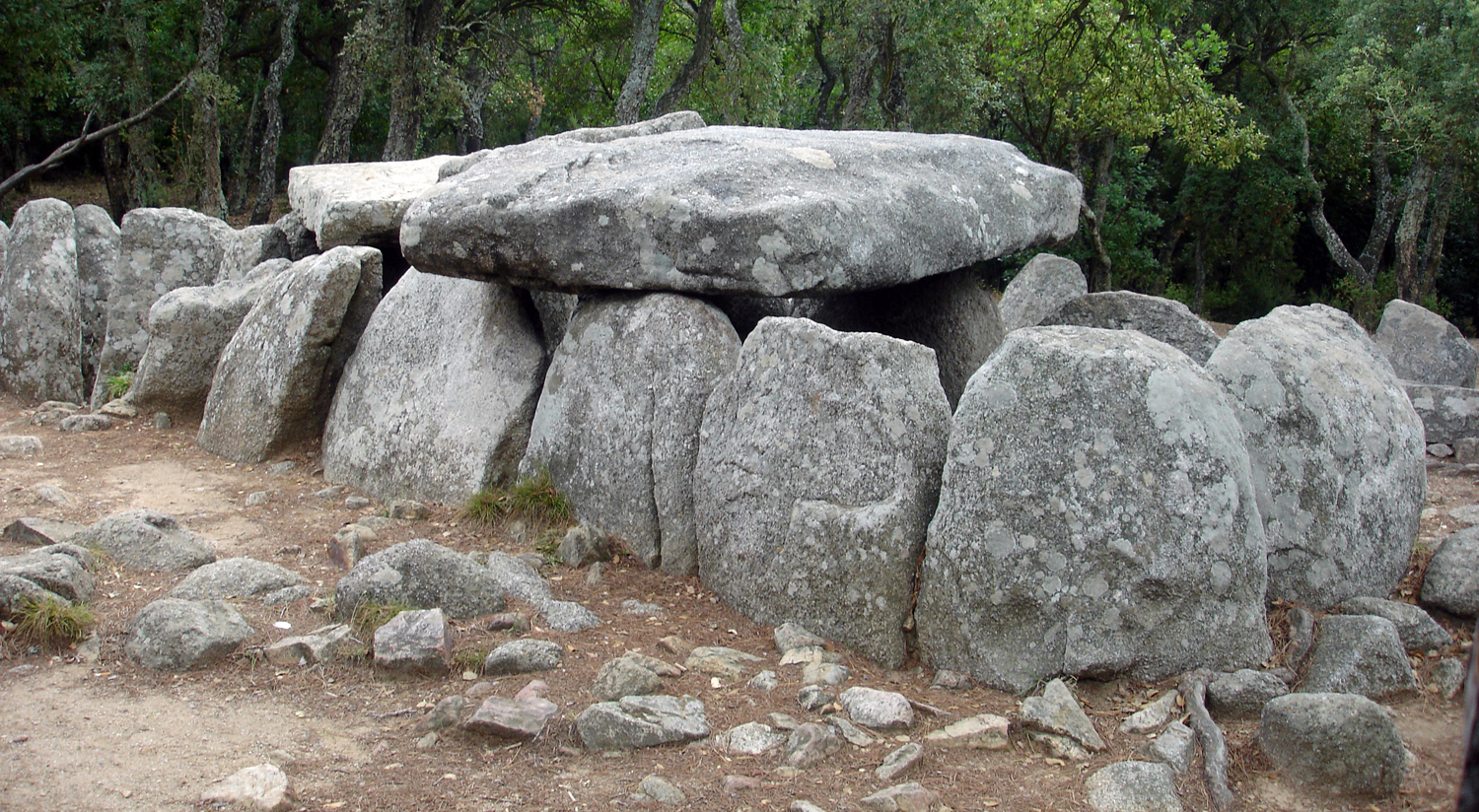
- The dolmen in 2007
- Interactive map of Daina's Cave
- 41°51′24.1″N 2°59′28.1″E
- Type: Dolmen
- Location: Catalonia, Spain

History
- Built: c. 2450 BC

Site notes
- Material: Granite
- Height: 1.5 m (4 ft 11 in)
- Diameter: 11 m (36 ft)
- Discovered: 1894 by Agusti Casas

Cova d'en Daina (English: Daina's Cave) is a dolmen located near Romanyà de la Selva, in the municipality of Santa Cristina d'Aro, Catalonia, Spain.

== Description ==
The dolmen was built out of granite blocks and is dated around 2700–2200 BC. It was discovered by Pere Cama i Casas and the first mention of its uncovering was by Agustí Casas in 1894. It was later excavated by Lluís Esteva i Cruañas, who unearthed human bones and teeth, flint arrowheads, knife and pottery fragments, and necklace beads. It was partially reconstructed in the 1950s. It is seven metres long and made up of an entrance passage into the funeral chamber, with a circular tumulus that is 11 metres in diameter. The entrance to the tomb is oriented to the southeast, which allows sunlight to reach the interior on the winter solstice.

== Gallery ==
Plan of Cova d'en Daina

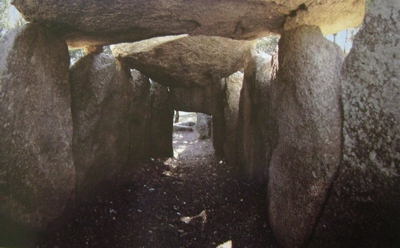
Interior view of the Cova d'en Daina

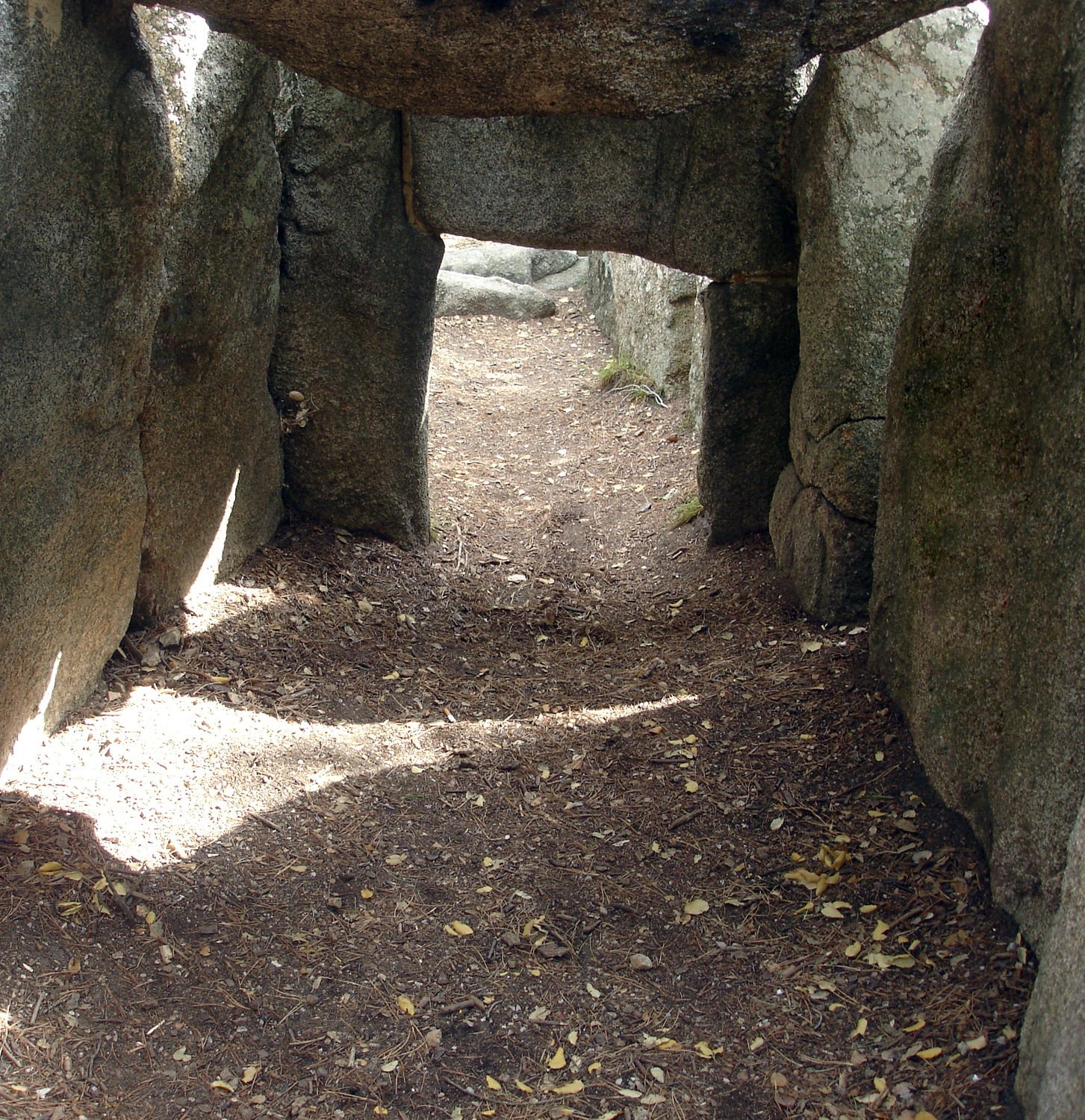
Interior view of the Cova d'en Daina

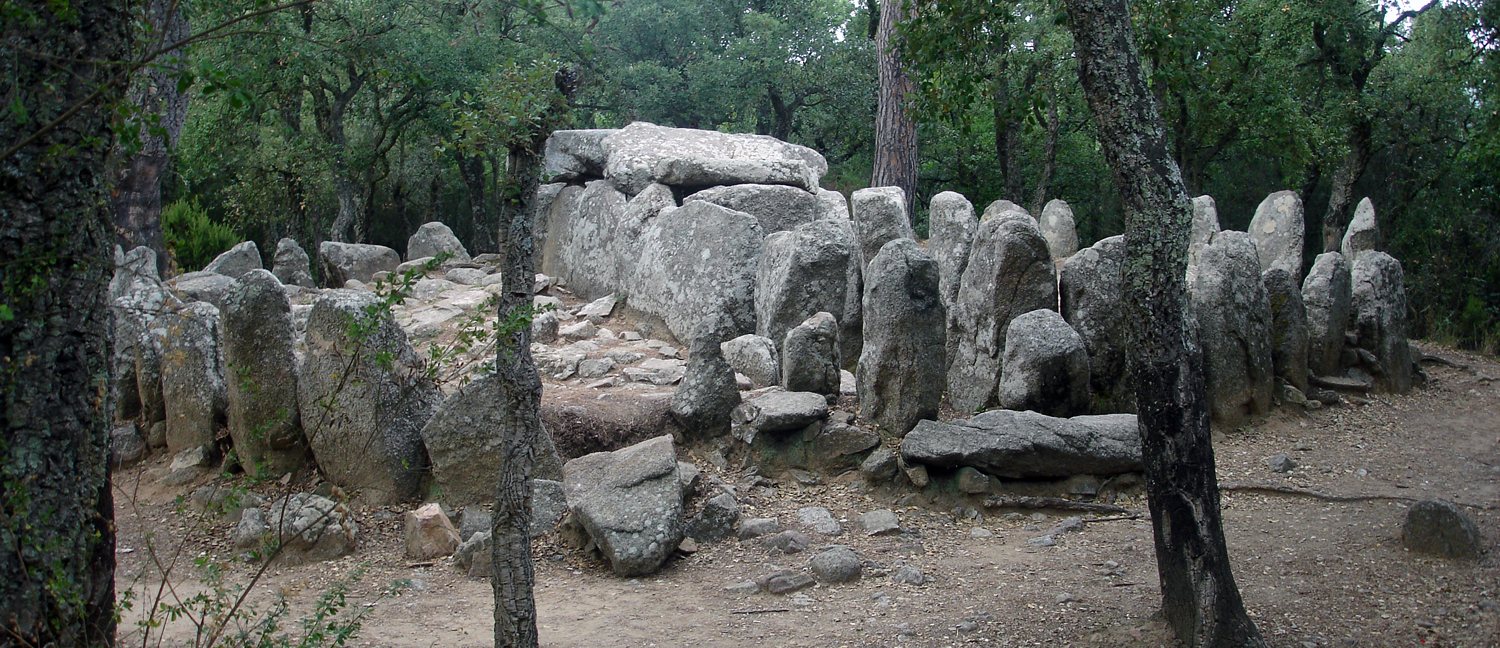

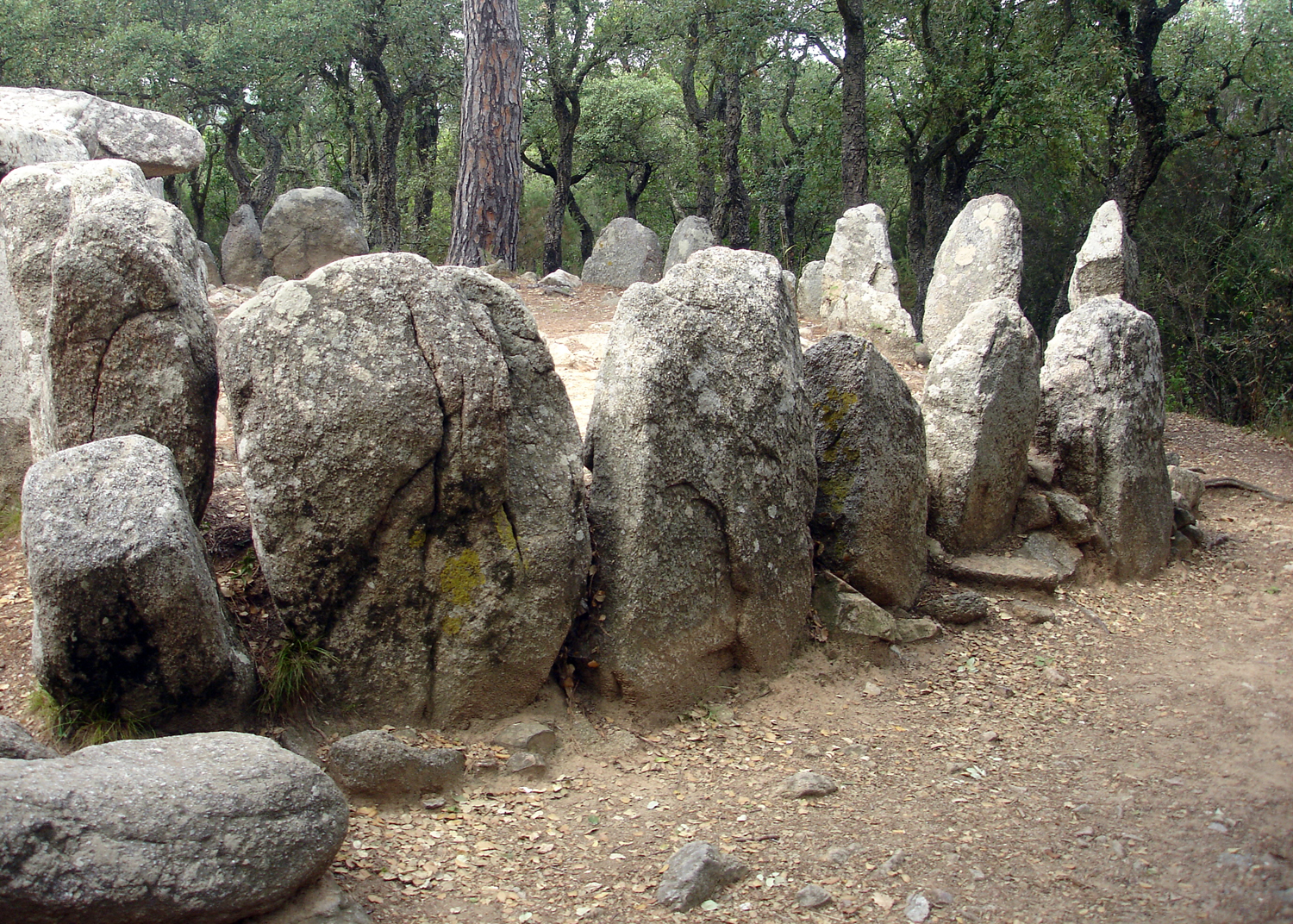

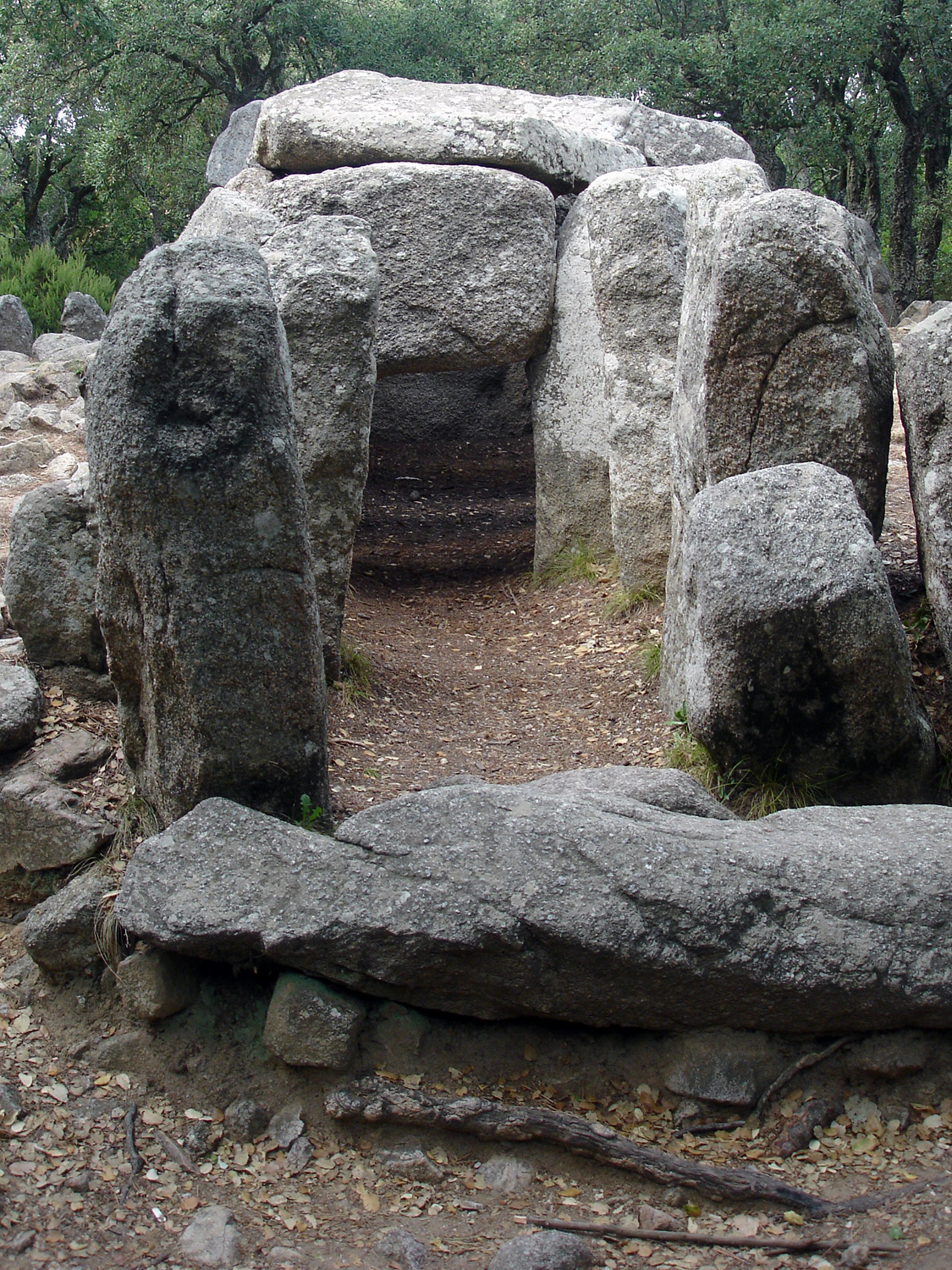
