= Rediscovering the Yangtze River =

2006 Chinese television series

Rediscovering the Yangtze River (Chinese: 再说长江; pinyin: zàishuō chángjiāng) is a 2006 documentary created by China Central Television to follow up on an earlier 1984 documentary film named "The Story of the Yangtze River" (Chinese: 话说长江; pinyin: huàshuō chángjiāng).

It is China's first documentary shot entirely in 1080i HDTV. Filming began in 2004 and the first episode aired in July 2006. The series has a total of 33 episodes with a run time of 30 minutes per episode. An English version has also aired on CCTV's International English channel in July 2007. Both the Chinese and English versions are now available online in low resolution.

The series is being aired on TVB Jade and TVB High Definition Jade under a Cantonese dub.
