= List of major power stations in the Tibet Autonomous Region =

This article lists the major power stations located in Tibet.

== Non-renewable ==
=== Coal, gas and fuel oil based ===
Station	Name in Chinese	Coordinates	Capacity (MW)	Operational units and (type)	Under construction units	Planned units	Decommissioned units (year)	Reference
Dongga Power Station	东嘎电厂	29°39′17″N 90°57′30″E	283.7	1*180MW (gas), 9*11.52MW (fuel)				

== Renewable ==
=== Hydroelectric ===
==== Conventional ====
Station	Name in Chinese	Coordinates	River	Total capacity (MW)	Dam height (meters)	Status	Units
Lower Yarlung Zangbo River Hydropower Project	雅鲁藏布江下游水电工程	29°28′15″N 94°49′42″E (dam), 29°10′59″N 94°10′33″E (outlet)	Yarlung Tsangpo River	81,000		Under construction	
Ngari Hydro Power Station	阿里水电站	32°31′26″N 80°09′20″E	Sengge River	0.8		Operational	2 x 0.4MW
Pangduo Hydro Power Station	旁多水电站	30°10′46″N 91°20′59″E	Lhasa River	160		Operational	4 x 40 MW
Zhikong Hydro Power Station	直孔水电站	29°58′02″N 91°52′33″E	Lhasa River	100	47	Operational	4 x 25MW
Bayu Hydro Power Station	巴玉水电站	29°13′33″N 92°19′22″E	Yarlung Tsangpo River			Proposed	
Dagu Hydro Power Station	大古水电站	29°14′41″N 92°23′50″E	Yarlung Tsangpo River	660	117	Operational	4 x 110MW
Jiexu Hydro Power Station	街需水电站	29°15′08″N 92°26′29″E	Yarlung Tsangpo River	560		Under construction	4 x 140MW
Zangmu Hydro Power Station	藏木水电站	29°11′05″N 92°31′02″E	Yarlung Tsangpo River	540	116	Operational	6 x 85MW
Jiacha Hydro Power Station	加查水电站	29°08′23″N 92°32′48″E	Yarlung Tsangpo River	360	83	Operational	3 x 120MW
Lengda Hydro Power Station	冷达水电站	29°07′22″N 92°39′26″E	Yarlung Tsangpo River			Proposed	
Zhongda Hydro Power Station	仲达水电站	29°03′44″N 92°48′48″E	Yarlung Tsangpo River			Proposed	
Langzhen Hydro Power Station	朗镇水电站	29°02′36″N 93°03′24″E	Yarlung Tsangpo River			Proposed	
Changbo Hydro Power Station	昌波水电站	29°21′10″N 99°3′58″E (dam), 29°15′42″N 99°6′7″E (outlet)	Jinsha River	826	58	Under construction	4*185MW, 2*43MW
Suwalong Hydro Power Station	苏洼龙水电站	29°26′2″N 99°03′51″E	Jinsha River	1,200	112	Operational	4 x 300MW
Batang Hydro Power Station	巴塘水电站	29°56′32″N 99°03′16″E	Jinsha River	750	69	Operational	3*250MW
Lawa Hydro Power Station	拉哇水电站	30°05′14″N 99°02′26″E	Jinsha River	2,000	239	Under construction	
Yebatan Hydro Power Station	叶巴滩水电站	30°45′27″N 98°57′30″E	Jinsha River	2,440	217	Under construction	4*510MW, 2*200MW
Boluo Hydro Power Station	波罗水电站		Jinsha River	960		Proposed	
Yanbi Hydro Power Station	岩比水电站		Jinsha River	300		Proposed	
Gangtuo Hydro Power Station	岗托水电站		Jinsha River	1,100		Proposed	
Quzika Hydro Power Station	曲孜卡水电站		Lancang River	405	79.5	Under construction	
Zhala Hydro Power Station	扎拉水电站	inlet: 28°45′38″N 98°28′31″E outlet: 28°44′01″N 98°26′22″E	Yuqu River	1,015	67	Under construction	4*250MW, 3*5MW

==== Pumped-storage ====
Station	Name in Chinese	Coordinates	River	Capacity (MW)	Rated head (meters)	Status	Units
Yamdrok Hydropower Station	羊卓雍湖抽水蓄能电厂	Inlet 29°11′11″N 90°35′47″E, outlet 29°15′51″N 90°36′24″E	Yamdrok Lake	112.5		Operational	5 x 22.5MW

== See also ==
- List of power stations on Indus river system
- List of power stations in China
- List of power stations in Asia
- List of power stations
