= List of major power stations in Sichuan =

This page lists the major power stations located in Sichuan Province, China.

== Non-renewable ==
=== Coal-based ===
| Station | Name in Chinese | Coordinates | Capacity (MW) | Operational units and (type) | Under construction units | Reference |
|---|---|---|---|---|---|---|
| Guang'an Power Station | 广安电厂 | 30°31′40″N 106°49′34″E | 2,400 | 4×300MW, 2×600MW | | |
| Tianming Power Station | 天明电厂 | 31°52′12″N 104°54′35″E | 2,000 | 2×1,000MW | | |
| China Coal Energy Guangyuan Power Station | 中煤广元电厂 | 32°19′54″N 105°34′23″E | 2,000 | | 2×1,000MW | |
| Nanchong Power Station | 南充燃煤发电项目 | | 2,000 | | 2×1,000MW | |
| Jiangyou Power Station | 江油电厂 | 31°48′17″N 104°46′10″E | 1,260 | 2×300MW, 2×330MW | | |
| Luzhou Power Station | 泸州电厂 | 28°46′31″N 105°17′01″E | 1,200 | 2×600MW | | |
| Jintang Power Station | 金堂电厂 | 30°42′20″N 104°34′47″E | 1,200 | 2×600MW | | |
| Fuxi Power Station | 福溪电厂 | 28°39′49″N 104°41′01″E | 1,200 | 2×600MW | | |
| Gongxian Power Station | 珙县电厂 | 28°16′08″N 104°40′26″E | 1,200 | 2×600MW | | |
| Baima Power Station | 白马电厂 | 29°31′30″N 105°00′47″E | 600 | 1×600MW | | |
| Huayinshan Power Station | 华蓥山发电厂 | 30°53′31″N 107°03′03″E | 600 | 2×300MW | | |

=== Gas-based ===
| Station | Name in Chinese | Coordinates | Capacity (MW) | Operational units and (type) | Under construction units | Reference |
|---|---|---|---|---|---|---|
| Ziyang Natural Gas Power Station | 资阳燃气电厂 | 30°4′42″N 105°25′19″E | 1,400 | 2×700MW | | |
| Zhongjiang Natural Gas Power Station | 中江燃气电厂 | 30°51′29″N 104°36′34″E | 1,400 | 2×700MW | | |
| Guangyuan Natural Gas Power Station | 广元燃机工程 | 32°22′23″N 105°43′13″E | 1,400 | | 2×700MW | |
| Luzhou Natural Gas Power Station | 泸州燃机工程 | 28°46′45″N 105°17′7″E | 1,400 | | 2×700MW | |
| Anju Natural Gas Power Station | 安居燃气发电 | | 1,400 | | 2×700MW | |
| Pengzhou Natural Gas Power Station | 华能彭州燃机项目 | | 1,001 | | 2×500.49MW | |
| Dazhou Natural Gas Power Station | 达州燃气电厂 | 31°06′54″N 107°29′05″E | 700 | 2×350MW | | |

== Renewable ==
=== Hydroelectric ===
The installed conventional hydropower capacity in Sichuan province has surpassed 31,000MW. By 2020, the hydropower installed capacity in Sichuan province was expected to increase to over 90,000 MW, accounting for a quarter share of total Chinese hydropower installed capacity.

==== Conventional ====
| Station | Name in Chinese | Coordinates | River | Total capacity (MW) | Dam height (meters) | Status | Units | Reference |
|---|---|---|---|---|---|---|---|---|
| Xiangjiaba Hydro Power Station | 向家坝水电站 | 28°38′41″N 104°23′32″E | Yangtze (Jinsha) | 7,750 | 161 | Operational | 8×800MW, 3×450MW | |
| Xiluodu Hydro Power Station | 溪洛渡水电站 | 28°15′30″N 103°39′00″E | Yangtze (Jinsha) | 13,860 | 278 | Operational | 18×770MW | |
| Baihetan Hydro Power Station | 白鹤滩水电站 | 27°13′22″N 102°54′10″E | Yangtze (Jinsha) | 16,000 | 289 | Operational | 16×1,000MW | |
| Wudongde Hydro Power Station | 乌东德水电站 | 26°19′28″N 102°38′03″E | Yangtze (Jinsha) | 10,200 | 270 | Operational | 12×850MW | |
| Yinjiang Hydro Power Station | 银江水电站 | 26°35′28″N 101°46′16″E | Yangtze (Jinsha) | 390 | 73 | Under construction | 6×65MW | |
| Jinsha Hydro Power Station | 金沙水电站 | 26°34′24″N 101°38′34″E | Yangtze (Jinsha) | 560 | 66 | Operational | 4×140MW | |
| Guanyinyan Hydro Power Station | 观音岩水电站 | 26°31′13″N 101°26′15″E | Yangtze (Jinsha) | 3,000 | 159 | Operational | 5×600MW | |
| Tuoding Hydro Power Station | 拖顶水电站 | | Jinsha | 2,060 | | In prep | | |
| Rimian Hydro Power Station | 日冕水电站 | | Jinsha | 2,700 | | In prep | | |
| Baiqiu Hydro Power Station | 白丘水电站 | | Jinsha | 1,500 | | Proposed | | |
| Enan Hydro Power Station | 俄南水电站 | | Jinsha | 900 | | Proposed | | |
| Xulong Hydro Power Station | 旭龙水电站 | 28°45′42″N 99°6′59″E | Jinsha | 2,400 | 213 | Under construction | 4×600MW | |
| Changbo Hydro Power Station | 昌波水电站 | 29°21′10″N 99°3′58″E (dam), 29°15′42″N 99°6′7″E (outlet) | Jinsha | 826 | 45 | Under construction | | |
| Suwalong Hydro Power Station | 苏洼龙水电站 | 29°26′05″N 99°03′39″E | Jinsha | 1,200 | 112 | Operational | 4×300MW | |
| Batang Hydro Power Station | 巴塘水电站 | 29°56′32″N 99°03′16″E | Jinsha | 750 | 69 | Operational | 3*250MW | |
| Lawa Hydro Power Station | 拉哇水电站 | 30°05′14″N 099°02′26″E | Jinsha | 2,000 | 239 | Under construction | | |
| Yebatan Hydro Power Station | 叶巴滩水电站 | 30°45′27″N 98°57′30″E | Jinsha | 2,440 | 217 | Under construction | 4×510MW, 2×200MW | |
| Boluo Hydro Power Station | 波罗水电站 | | Jinsha | 960 | 134 | Proposed | 3×320MW | |
| Yanbi Hydro Power Station | 岩比水电站 | | Jinsha | 300 | | Proposed | | |
| Gangtuo Hydro Power Station | 岗托水电站 | | Jinsha | 1100 | | Proposed | | |
| Tongzilin Hydro Power Station | 桐子林水电站 | 26°42′25″N 101°51′01″E | Yalong | 600 | 71.3 | Operational | 4×150MW | |
| Ertan Hydro Power Station | 二滩水电站 | 26°49′15″N 101°46′52″E | Yalong | 3,300 | 240 | Operational | 6×550MW | |
| Guandi Hydro Power Station | 官地水电站 | 27°49′18″N 101°52′54″E | Yalong | 2,400 | 168 | Operational | 4×600MW | |
| Jinping II Hydro Power Station | 锦屏二级水电站 | 28°14′3″N 101°38′44″E Inlet 28°13′12″N 101°38′42″E, Outlet 28°08′16″N 101°47′32″E | Yalong | 4,800 | 34 | Operational | 8×600MW | |
| Jinping I Hydro Power Station | 锦屏一级水电站 | 28°10′53″N 101°37′45″E | Yalong | 3,600 | 305 | Operational | 6×600MW | |
| Kala Hydro Power Station | 卡拉水电站 | 28°24′05″N 101°16′37″E | Yalong | 1,080 | 128 | Under construction | | |
| Yangfanggou Hydro Power Station | 杨房沟水电站 | 28°39′05″N 101°12′02″E | Yalong | 1,500 | 158 | Operational | | |
| Mengdigou Hydro Power Station | 孟底沟水电站 | 28°56′54″N 101°10′47″E | Yalong | 2,400 | 198 | Under construction | 4×600MW | |
| Lenggu Hydro Power Station | 楞古水电站 | 29°24′58″N 101°08′29″E | Yalong | 2,718 | 174 | In prep | | |
| Yageng I Hydro Power Station | 牙根一级水电站 | 30°05′25″N 101°00′17″E | Yalong | 300 | | In prep | 3×100MW | |
| Yageng II Hydro Power Station | 牙根二级水电站 | 29°40′04″N 101°05′02″E | Yalong | 990 | | In prep | | |
| Lianghekou Hydro Power Station | 两河口水电站 | 30°11′40″N 101°00′35″E | Yalong | 4,200 | 293 | Under construction | 6×500MW, 4×300MW | |
| Gongbagou Hydro Power Station | 龚坝沟水电站 | | Yalong | 500 | | Proposed | | |
| Gongke Hydro Power Station | 共科水电站 | | Yalong | 400 | | Proposed | | |
| Xinlong Hydro Power Station | 新龙水电站 | | Yalong | 500 | | Proposed | | |
| Yingda Hydro Power Station | 英达水电站 | | Yalong | 500 | | Proposed | | |
| Tongha Hydro Power Station | 通哈水电站 | | Yalong | 200 | | Proposed | | |
| Geni Hydro Power Station | 格尼水电站 | | Yalong | 200 | | Proposed | | |
| Ada Hydro Power Station | 阿达水电站 | | Yalong | 250 | | Proposed | | |
| Reba Hydro Power Station | 热巴水电站 | | Yalong | 250 | | Proposed | | |
| Renqingling Hydro Power Station | 仁青岭水电站 | | Yalong | 300 | | Proposed | | |
| Angu Hydro Power Station | 安谷水电站 | 29°30′05″N 103°37′52″E | Dadu | 772 | 40.7 | Operational | 4×190MW, 1×12 | |
| Shawan Hydro Power Station | 沙湾水电站 | 29°20′05″N 103°36′38″E | Dadu | 480 | | Operational | 4×120MW | |
| Tongjiezi Hydro Power Station | 铜街子水电站 | 29°15′24″N 103°37′58″E | Dadu | 600 | 82 | Operational | 4×150MW | |
| Gongzui Hydro Power Station | 龚嘴水电站 | 29°18′12″N 103°28′45″E | Dadu | 770 | 85.5 | Operational | 7×110MW | |
| Shaping II Hydro Power Station | 沙坪二级水电站 | 29°14′12″N 103°12′28″E | Dadu | 348 | 63 | Operational | 6×58MW | |
| Shaping I Hydro Power Station | 沙坪一级水电站 | 29°17′39″N 103°06′31″E | Dadu | 360 | | Operational | 6×60MW | |
| Zhengtouba II Hydro Power Station | 枕头坝二级水电站 | 29°14′09″N 103°04′40″E | Dadu | 300 | | Under construction | | |
| Zhengtouba I Hydro Power Station | 枕头坝一级水电站 | 29°14′11″N 103°02′42″E | Dadu | 720 | | Operational | 4×180MW | |
| Yongle Hydro Power Station | 永乐级水电站 | Inlet 29°17′15″N 103°01′36″E, Outlet 29°15′59″N 103°04′53″E | Dadu | 58 | | Operational | | |
| Shenxigou Hydro Power Station | 深溪沟水电站 | 29°17′58″N 102°55′56″E | Dadu | 660 | 49.5 | Operational | 4×165MW | |
| Pubugou Hydro Power Station | 瀑布沟水电站 | 29°12′34″N 102°50′11″E | Dadu | 3,600 | 186 | Operational | 6×600MW | |
| Laoyingyan I Hydro Power Station | 老鹰岩一级水电站 | 29°17′10″N 102°17′1″E | Dadu | 300 | | In prep | | |
| Laoyingyan II Hydro Power Station | 老鹰岩二级 水电站 | 29°15′36″N 102°18′11″E | Dadu | 420 | | Under construction | 3×140MW | |
| Longtoushi Hydro Power Station | 龙头石水电站 | 29°20′06″N 102°15′18″E | Dadu | 700 | 72.5 | Operational | 4×175MW | |
| Dagangshan | 大岗山水电站 | 29°26′54″N 102°13′10″E | Dadu | 2,600 | 210 | Operational | 4×650MW | |
| Yingliangbao Hydro Power Station | 硬梁包水电站 | Inlet 29°44′18″N 102°12′13″E, Outlet 29°38′06″N 102°10′33″E | Dadu | 1,160 | (run-of-the-river, 15.1 km tunnel) | Under construction | 4×270MW, 1×36MW | |
| Luding Hydro Power Station | 泸定水电站 | 29°56′47″N 102°13′37″E | Dadu | 920 | 85.5 | Operational | 4×230MW | |
| Huangjinping Hydro Power Station | 黄金坪水电站 | 30°08′51″N 102°10′25″E | Dadu | 850 | 95.5 | Operational | 4×200MW, 2×25MW | |
| Changheba Hydro Power Station | 长河坝水电站 | 30°15′43″N 102°11′43″E | Dadu | 2,600 | 240 | Operational | 4×650MW | |
| Houziyan Hydro Power Station | 猴子岩水电站 | 30°33′13″N 102°03′24″E | Dadu | 1,700 | 223.5 | Operational | 4×425MW | |
| Badi Hydro Power Station | 巴底水电站 | | Dadu | 680 | 112 | Proposed | | |
| Jinchuan Hydro Power Station | 金川水电站 | 31°35′09″N 102°04′39″E | Dadu | 860 | 111.5 | Under construction | 4×215MW | |
| Shuangjiankou Hydro Power Station | 双江口水电站 | 31°47′53″N 101°54′50″E | Dadu | 2,000 | 314 | Under construction | 4×500MW | |
| Busigou Hydro Power Station | 卜寺沟水电站 | | Dadu | 360 | 130 | Proposed | | |
| Dawei Hydro Power Station | 达维水电站 | | Dadu | 270 | 107 | Proposed | 2×135MW | |
| Bala Hydro Power Station | 巴拉水电站 | 32°15′26″N 101°36′35″E | Dadu | 700 | 220 | Under construction | | |
| Xiaerjia Hydro Power Station | 下尔呷水电站 | | Dadu | 540 | | Proposed | | |
| Kajiwa Hydro Power Station | 卡基娃水电站 | 28°42′41″N 100°53′18″E | Muli | 452.4 | 171 | Operational | 4×110MW | |
| Lizhou Hydro Power Station | 立洲水电站 | 28°05′22″N 100°56′03″E | Muli | 355 | 132.5 | Operational | 3×115MW, 1×10MW | |
| Shangtongba Hydro Power Station | 上通坝水电站 | | Muli | 240 | | Operational | 3×80MW | |
| Muli Shawan Hydro Power Station | 木里河沙湾水电站 | | Muli | 280 | | Operational | | |
| Zipingpu Hydro Power Station | 紫坪铺水电站 | 31°02′06″N 103°34′27″E | Min | 760 | 156 | Operational | 4×190MW | |
| Taipingyi Hydro Power Station | 太平驿水电站 | 31°13′33″N 103°29′11″E | Min | 260 | | Operational | 4×65MW | |
| Futang Hydro Power Station | 福堂水电站 | 31°29′03″N 103°36′12″E | Min | 360 | | Operational | 4×90MW | |
| Qianwei Hydro Power Station | 犍为航电枢纽 | 29°14′18″N 103°55′19″E | Min | 500.4 | | Operational | 9×55.6MW | |
| Longxikou Hydro Power Station | 龙溪口航电枢纽 | 29°03′39″N 104°08′34″E | Min | 480 | | Under construction | 9×53.3MW | |
| Baozhusi Hydro Power Station | 宝珠寺水电站 | 32°31′12″N 105°36′43″E | Bailong | 700 | 132 | Operational | 4×175MW | |
| Qiaoqi Hydro Power Station | 硗碛水电站 | | Baoxinghe | 240 | 125 | Operational | 3×80MW | |
| Yele Hydro Power Station | 冶勒水电站 | 28°55′08″N 102°13′03″E | Nanyahe | 240 | 124.5 | Operational | | |
| Dafa Hydro Power Station | 大发水电站 | | Tianwanhe | 240 | | Operational | | |
| Jinwo Hydro Power Station | 金窝水电站 | 29°23′50″N 101°58′36″E | Tianwanhe | 280 | 124.5 | Operational | 2×130MW | |
| Renzonghai Hydro Power Station | 仁宗海水电站 | 29°22′35″N 101°54′44″E | Tianwanhe | 240 | 56 | Operational | | |
| Xiaotiandu Hydro Power Station | 小天都水电站 | | Wasigou | 240 | 39 | Operational | | |
| Tingzikou Hydro Power Station | 亭子口水电站 | 31°49′24″N 105°52′07″E | Jialing | 1,100 | 116 | Operational | 4×275MW | |
| Dusong Hydro Power Station | 独松水电站 | | Big Jinchuan | 1,360 | 111.5 | Proposed | | |
| Maoergai Hydro Power Station | 毛尔盖水电站 | 32°03′56″N 103°13′55″E | Heishui | 420 | 147 | Operational | 3×140MW | |
| Jianke Hydro Power Station | 剑科水电站 | | Maoergai | 246 | 83 | Under construction | 3×82MW | |
| Jiangbian Hydro Power Station | 江边水电站 | 28°36′18″N 101°41′58″E | Jiulong | 330 | | Under construction | 3×110MW | |
| Xigu Hydro Power Station | 溪古水电站 | | Jiulong | 249 | | Under construction | 3×83MW | |
| Guanzhou Hydro Power Station | 关州水电站 | | Xiaojinchuan | 240 | | Under construction | 3×80MW | |
| Jiniu Hydro Power Station | 吉牛水电站 | | Geshizha | 240 | | Operational | 2×120MW | |
| Chuosijia Hydro Power Station | 绰斯甲水电站 | | Chuosijia | 392 | | Under construction | | |
| Quxue Hydro Power Station | 去学水电站 | | Shuoqu | 246 | 164.2 | Under construction | 2×123MW | |
| Guwa Hydro Power Station | 古瓦水电站 | | Shuoqu | 222 | 150 | Operational | 3×74MW | |
| Gungqiao Hydro Power Station | 锅浪跷水电站 | 30°0′15″N 102°28′05″E | Tianquanhe | 220 | 186.3 | Under construction | 3×70MW | |

*Jingping II Hydro Power Station is a run-of-the-river type of power station. There are four water tunnels which are 16.6 km long in average each to divert the water through the Jingping mountains. The deepest point of the tunnel is 2,525 meters from the top of the mountain.

==== Pumped-storage ====
| Station | Name in Chinese | Coordinates | Capacity (MW) | Rated head (meters) | Status | Generator units | Under construction units |
|---|---|---|---|---|---|---|---|
| Daofu Pumped Storage Power Station | 道孚抽水蓄能电站 | | 2,100 | 760.7 | UC | | 6×350MW |
| Lianghekou Pumped Storage Power Station | 两河口混合式抽水蓄能电站 | | 1,200 | | UC | | 4×300MW |

=== Wind ===
| Station | Name in Chinese | Coordinates | Operational capacity (MW) | Status | Units |
|---|---|---|---|---|---|
| Decang | 德昌风电场 | | 16 | Under construction | 8×2MW |

== See also ==
- List of power stations in China
