= Xiaojiang =

Xiaojiang may refer to:

== First name ==
- Xiaojiang Chen (born 1963), Chinese-American virologist, immunologist, and structural biologist

== Surname ==
- Chen Xiaojiang (born 1962), Chinese editor and politician
- Hao Xiaojiang (born 1951), Chinese scientist
- Li Xiaojiang (born 1951), Chinese scholar of women's studies
- Liu Xiaojiang (born 1949), retired Chinese admiral

== Places ==
- Xiaojiang River (Yunnan), a right-bank tributary of the Jinsha River, China
