= Ren Zhong Feng =

Mountain in Sichuan, China

- Peak 156
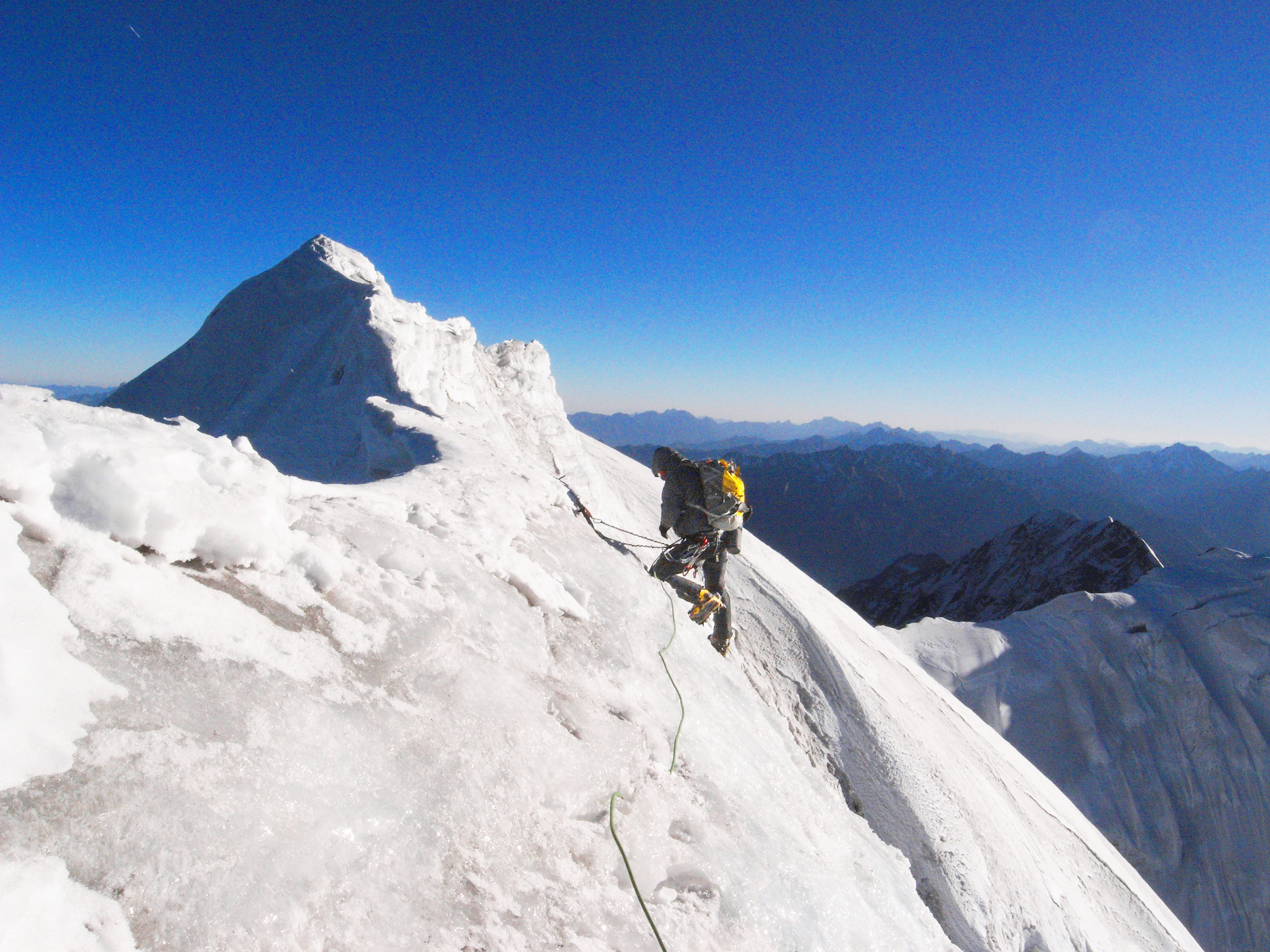
- Summit of Ren Zhong Feng

Highest point
- Elevation: 6,079 m (19,944 ft) (Note: Official height, as recorded by Tamotsu Nakamura. Martin Ploug and Kristoffer Szilas reported the height after their ascent as 5,820 m (19,090 ft).)
- Prominence: 1,647 m (5,404 ft)
- Parent peak: Mount Gongga
- Listing: Ultra
- Coordinates: 29°17′56″N 101°54′22″E

Naming
- Etymology: Renzonghai Dam

Geography
- Location within Sichuan
- Location: Kangding, Garzê Tibetan Autonomous Prefecture, Sichuan, China
- Parent range: Daxue Shan (大雪山)

Climbing
- First ascent: 2009 by Martin Ploug and Kristoffer Szilas
- Easiest route: Lost to Ice (M4, WI4)

Ren Zhong Feng (Chinese: 仁宗雪山; pinyin: Rénzōng xuěshān) is a mountain in the southern Daxue Shan mountain range in Garzê Tibetan Autonomous Prefecture, Sichuan, China. The mountain has an official height of 6,079 m (19,944 ft), although the first team to summit the peak recorded a height of around 5,820 m (19,090 ft). The peak is seldom climbed, with one expedition resulting in the disappearance of four Hungarian climbers.

== Toponymy ==
The mountain was first surveyed by the Sikong Expedition of 1932, an expedition sponsored by The Explorers Club. Surveyors Richard L. Burdsall and Arthur Emmons III calculated the heights of twenty five peaks from photographs taken in August 1932, including the then-unnamed Ren Zhong Feng. The two surveyors dubbed the mountain Peak 156, assigning it a height of 6,107.9 m (20,039 ft). Later in the expedition, Burdsall would be part of the first ascent of Mount Gongga.

In 2008, Japanese alpinist and photographer Tamotsu Nakamura explored and photographed the mountain, naming it Ren Zhong Feng (仁宗雪山, trans. Ren Zhong Snow Mountain), after the nearby Renzonghai Dam, which in turn is named after a lake created by a landslide dam during the reign of Emperor Renzong of Song.

== Geography ==
The mountain, which lies in the southern Daxue Shan range, is 32 km (20 mi) from Mount Gongga and 8.5 km (5.3 mi) from its namesake, Renzonghai Dam. The mountain is the largest within its own subrange, which contains at least ten peaks over 5,000 m (16,000 ft), most of which are unclimbed. The mountain sees 800–900 mm (31–35 in) of rain per year. The closest city to the mountain is Kangding. Due to the construction of the dam, there are many roads leading to and from the base of the mountain. The mountain is 250 km (160 mi) from Chengdu, where it is sometimes visible on days with low smog.

Tamotsu Nakamura reported the height of the mountain as 6,079 m (19,944 ft), which remains the official height. Nevertheless, Martin Ploug and Kristoffer Szilas reported that their altimeters read 5,820 m (19,090 ft) at the summit, and that Chinese surveys of the mountain recorded its height at 5,731 m (18,802 ft).

== Climbing history ==
The mountain was first introduced to climbers in 2008 by Tamotsu Nakamura, who had led more than thirty expeditions into eastern Tibet and western China looking for unclimbed peaks. Nakamura noted that access to the peak was "very easy", but it was almost unnoticed because the neighboring river valley was so deep that the peak could not be seen "except at one or two points".

In 2009, two expeditions attempted to complete the first ascent of the mountain. The first, a Hungarian team of four - Peter Csizmadia, Veronika Mikolovits, Balazs Pechtol and Kata Tolnay - arrived in early October. The expedition proceeded smoothly at first, with the team successively establishing a base camp and an advanced base camp. Nevertheless, according to the team's last post on 22 October, they encountered difficulties at 5,500 m (18,000 ft) meters and were forced to change their intended route to the summit. On the evening of 22 October, a collapsing serac caused a massive avalanche which swept down the upper flank of the mountain, likely burying the climbers and their camp. On 31 October 2009, the team had failed to return to Chengdu, and a search was launched. The initial search, and a subsequent ten-day search the following year yielded no trace of the climbers, in what remains the worst disaster in Hungarian mountaineering history.

The second expedition consisted of Danish Alpine Club members Carsten Cooper Jensen, Martin Ploug and Kristoffer Szilas, who learnt of the peak through Nakamura's report and pictures, and planned to summit in November 2009. After supporting search efforts for the missing Hungarian expedition, the expedition established a base camp at 3,000 m (9,800 ft) on 14 November 2009. Jensen turned back due to insufficient an oxygen supply at second camp, and Ploug and Szilas continued alone to the summit. The pair successfully reached the summit alpine style on 28 November, and successfully climbed off the mountain despite Ploug falling 30 m (98 ft) during the descent.

The mountain has only one other recorded ascent attempt, a Chinese team that turned back at 4,300 m (14,100 ft).
