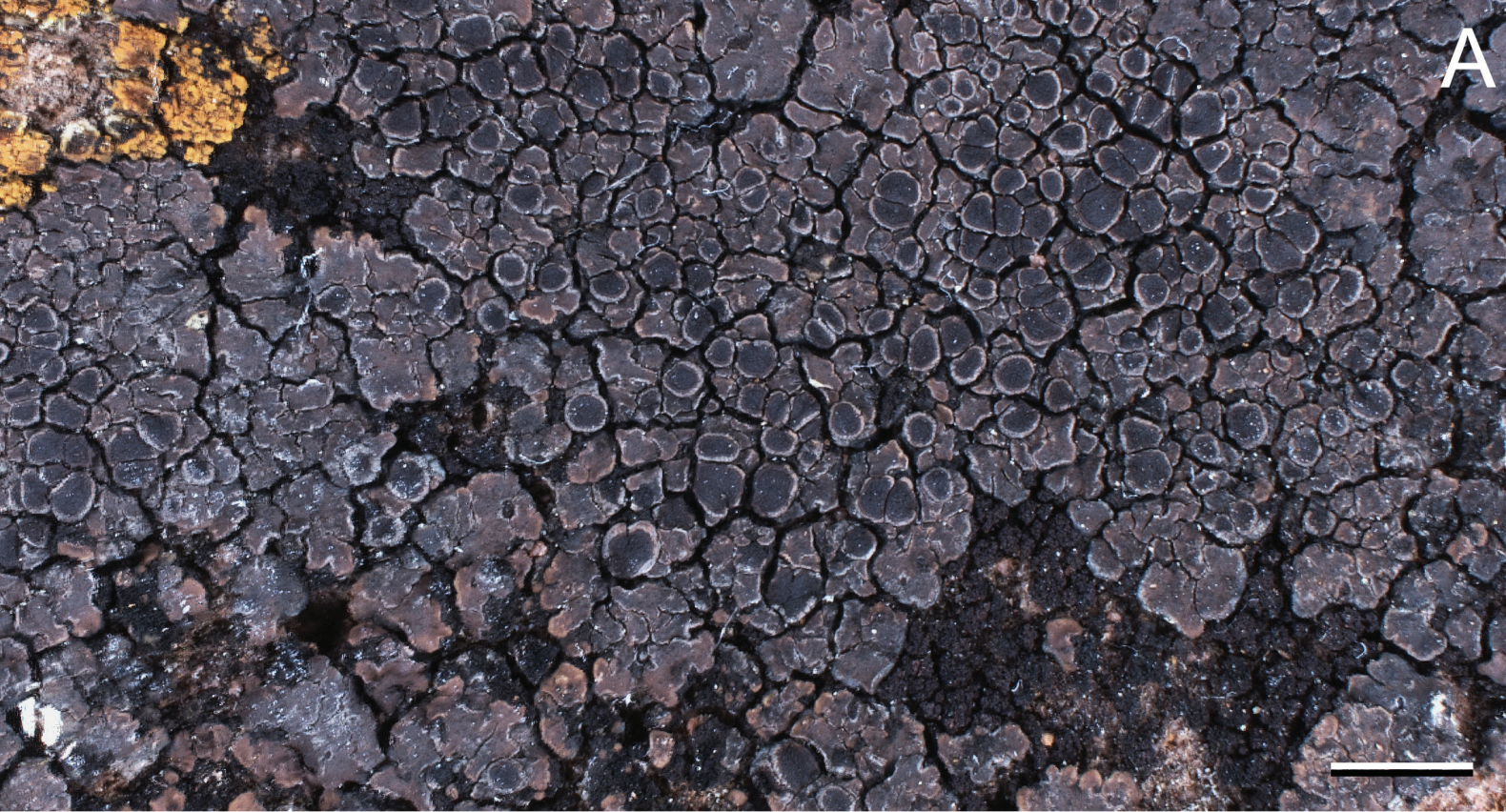
- scale bar: 2 mm

Scientific classification
- Kingdom: Fungi
- Division: Ascomycota
- Class: Lecanoromycetes
- Order: Teloschistales
- Family: Teloschistaceae
- Genus: Upretia
- Species: U. zeorina

Binomial name
- Upretia zeorina L.J.Li & Printzen (2023)
- Type locality: Huili, China

= Upretia zeorina =

Species of lichen-forming fungus

Upretia zeorina is a species of crustose lichen in the family Teloschistaceae. It forms small, dark brown to blackish scaly patches on exposed rock in the hot, dry valleys of the Jinsha River system in Sichuan and Yunnan provinces, at elevations of roughly 1,520 to 1,880 m (4,990 to 6,170 ft). The species is distinguished by its black fruiting bodies with a distinctive double-margined structure and a whitish powdery coating on the thallus. Chemically, it contains gyrophoric acid as its sole major secondary metabolite.

== Taxonomy ==
Upretia zeorina was described as a new species in 2023 by Lijuan Li and Christian Printzen, based on material collected from arid-valley localities in southwestern China. In internal transcribed spacer-based phylogenetic analyses, the specimens formed a well-supported lineage within Upretia, recovered as sister to Upretia squamulosa; the genus itself was recovered as monophyletic and sister to Ioplaca pindarensis. The type was collected on rock in Sichuan (Huili County) at about 1,880 m (6,170 ft).

The epithet zeorina refers to the apothecia, which have a zeorine structure with a thalline outer margin and a distinct inner proper margin. In the original comparison, U. zeorina was separated from the Indian type species U. amarkantakana by its darker thallus, zeorine (rather than lecanorine) apothecia with black discs, larger ascospores, longer conidia, and the presence of gyrophoric acid. It is also close to U. squamulosa in spore size and overall ecology, but differs in its blackish, partly pruinose thallus and black apothecial discs, and in producing gyrophoric acid without lecanoric acid.

== Description ==
The thallus is epilithic and areolate to squamulose, with an irregular outline. Individual squamules are typically flat and closely attached to the rock, only rarely lifting at the edges, and are about 0.5–2.5 mm across. The upper surface is brown to blackish brown, smooth to faintly cracked, and often has a whitish dusting of pruina, most evident around the margins. Beneath, the thallus lacks rhizines. The medulla is grey, and the photobiont is a trebouxioid green alga.

The apothecia are zeorine, sessile, and usually numerous, scattered or clustered, up to about 1.2 mm in diameter. The disc is black and ranges from slightly concave to flat; the inner proper margin persists and is typically slightly raised or level with the disc, while the thalline margin is the same colour as the thallus. Microscopically, the hymenium is iodine-positive (I+ blue), the asci are Teloschistes-type with eight spores, and the hyaline (colourless) ascospores are polarilocular and broadly ellipsoid, about 11.5–18.0 × 6.5–11.0 μm (septum 6.0–9.0 μm). Pycnidia are immersed, producing narrowly bacilliform conidia about 4.0–6.0 × 0.5 μm.

In spot tests, the thallus and thalline apothecial margin are K− but C+ (red). Thin-layer chromatography detected gyrophoric acid as the only major secondary metabolite reported for the species.

== Habitat and distribution ==
Upretia zeorina grows on exposed rock in arid valley habitats along the Jinsha River system, at elevations of roughly 1,520 to 1,880 m (4,990 to 6,170 ft). At the time of its original publication, it was known only from southwestern China, with records from Sichuan and Yunnan provinces. Reported collections include the type locality in Sichuan (Huili County) and several Yunnan localities (e.g., Heqing and Yuanmou counties), suggesting a scattered distribution within suitable hot, dry valley systems.
