= Ahai Dam =

- Location within China
- Interactive map of Ahai Dam
- Location: Yulong County, Lijiang, Yunnan
- Coordinates: 27°21′02″N 100°30′23″E
- Status: Operational
- Construction began: 2008
- Opening date: 2012
- Construction cost: 13.6 billion RMB ($2 billion USD)

Dam and spillways
- Type of dam: Gravity
- Impounds: Jinsha River
- Height: 138 m (453 ft)

Reservoir
- Creates: Ahai Reservoir
- Total capacity: 8,820,000,000 m^{3} (7,150,000 acre⋅ft)
- Surface area: 23.42 km^{2} (9.04 sq mi)

Power Station
- Commission date: 2012-2014
- Turbines: 5 x 400 MW Francis-type
- Installed capacity: 2,000 MW
- Annual generation: 8.887 billion kWh (est.)

The Ahai Dam (阿海水电站) is a gravity dam on the Jinsha River in Yulong County, Lijiang Prefecture, Yunnan and in the river reach at about 5 km in the lower reaches of Cuiyu River mouth. Preliminary construction began in 2008 and construction on the dam superstructure and power station began in 2010. The dam's first generator was operational in December 2012, the third by May 2013. The fifth and final generator was commissioned on 9 June 2014.

== Background ==
The dam section is a transverse valley with a water surface 60 to 150 m wide and low water level of 1048 m. The landforms on both banks are basically symmetrical. There is a measurement of about 50 m wide tableland and about 30 degrees above water surface in the left bank, and the slope in the right bank is about 27 degree and the slope above the elevation of 1500 m is about 48 degree. There is poor sand and soil materials and abundant limestone material satisfied with requirement of quality and reserves within 20 km in the dam area, which is qualified for setting up low dam according to existing geological data. In the light of topographic and geological conditions, the Ahai Dam section can be considered as local material dam type with low height of swell, suitable for connection of backwater with Liyuan cascade. The dam has normal water level of 1514 m, total reservoir capacity of 1.08 billion cubic meters and installed capacity of 2,000,000-2,200,000 kW. Now, a low-cost road to Niukexu has been opened to traffic, and there is only an about 5 km long path to the dam section.

== Environmental impact ==
This project marked the first time representatives from Chinese environmental groups were invited to participate in the environmental impact assessment for a major hydropower project in China, according to the First Financial Daily. Representatives of the Institute for Public & Environmental Affairs and the Green Earth Volunteers took part in the meeting to conduct technical evaluation on environmental impact assessment for the dam on the Jinsha River on December 29–30, 2008 in Beijing.

== See also ==
- List of conventional hydroelectric power stations
- List of power stations in China
