= First ascent =

Mountaineering and climbing term

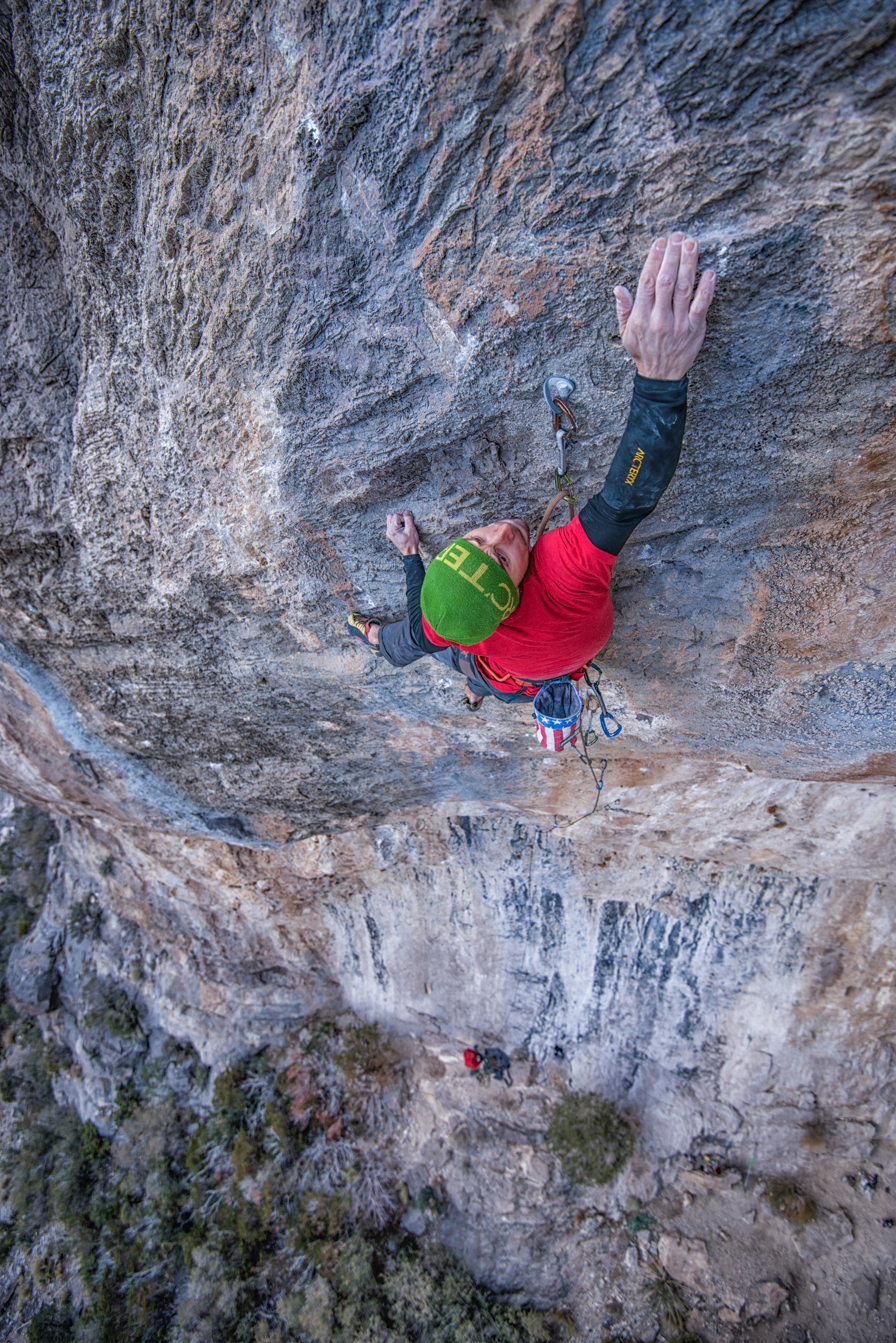
Jonathan Siegrist on the first free ascent (FFA) of Spectrum 5.14c (8c+), Red Rocks, Nevada.

In mountaineering and climbing, a first ascent (abbreviated to FA in guide books), is the first successful documented climb to the top of a mountain peak or the top of a particular climbing route. Early 20th-century mountaineers and climbers were mainly focused on reaching the tops of notable mountain peaks (e.g. the eight-thousanders such as Mount Everest) and the tops of iconic climbing routes (e.g. the great north faces of the Alps such as the Eiger) by whatever means possible, and often using considerable amounts of aid climbing and/or with large expedition style support teams allowing them to "lay siege" to the climb.

As all the key tops were summited, the manner or "style" in which each top was reached became important to climbers, and particularly the ability to complete the ascent without the use of any artificial aids, which is called free climbing. In free-climbing, the term first free ascent (abbreviated FFA) denotes where a mountain or climbing route is ascended without any artificial aid — note that equipment for protection in the event of a fall can be used as long as it did not aid in the climber's upward progression. Completing the FFA of a climbing route is often called freeing (or more latterly sending) a route, and is highly coveted.

As the sport of climbing developed, additional types of ascent became notable and chronicled in guidebooks and climbing journals. In mountaineering, and in the sub-discipline of alpine climbing in particular, the first winter ascent is also recorded, given the significantly greater difficulty of the undertaking. The first solo ascent is also typically noted, although the first free solo ascent is a more controversial aspect, given the concerns about advocating such a dangerous form of climbing. With the significant rise in female participation in all forms of climbing, the first female free ascent (or FFFA) has also become notable.

== In mountaineering and alpinism ==
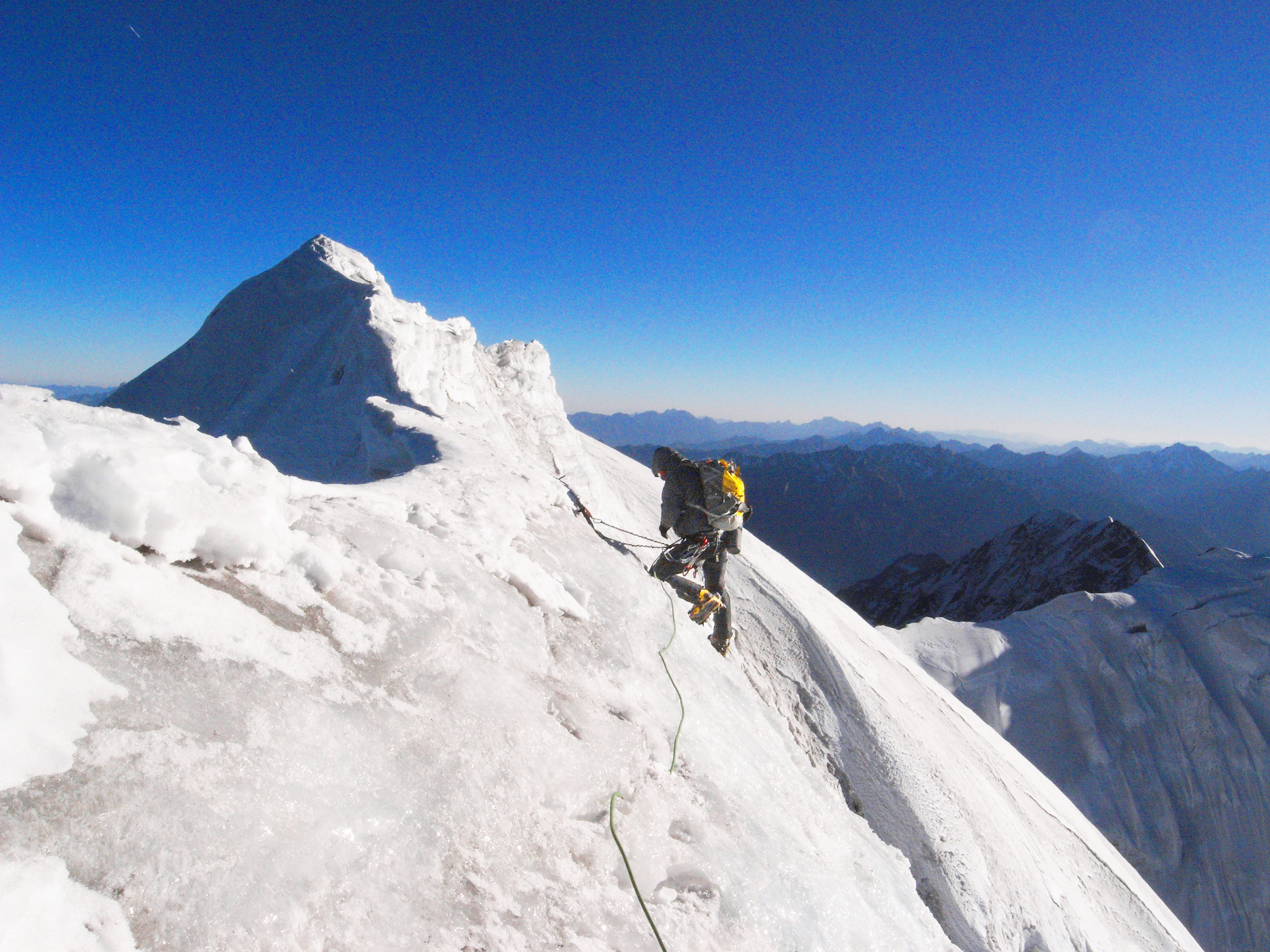
Danish climbers Kristoffer Szilas and Martin Ploug (pictured) about to summit the unclimbed Ren Zhong Feng (5800m), in China via their new route Lost to Ice (grade TD M4, WI4, 1300m)

As mountaineering developed in the 20th century, the attainment of a summit by almost any means was replaced by ascents that reflected the style used and the conditions faced. In 2008, the most prestigious annual prize in mountaineering, the Piolet d'Or, amended its focus to small light-weight alpine-style teams using no form of aid or support, rather than on large expedition-style teams using "siege" techniques.

The most notable types of mountaineering first ascents that are chronicled are:

- First ascent. The most notable first ascents started with the golden age of alpinism when the main alpine peaks were summited (and often using aid climbing). In the 1930s, the focus moved to the first ascents of the great north faces of the Alps, and the Eiger in particular. The 1950s saw the first ascents of most of the fourteen eight-thousanders, and Everest in particular. By the 1980s, the rock spires of Trango Towers in the Karakoram, and Torres del Paine in Patagonia also had first ascents.
- First winter ascent. The winter climbing season is between December 21 and March 20. The first winter ascents of the great north faces of the Alps were a coveted prize, particularly the "Trilogy" of the three hardest, the Eiger, the Matterhorn, and the Grandes Jorasses. The most notable first winter ascents were the Himalayan and Karakoram eight-thousanders, where the hardest, K2, was only summited in winter in 2021 (66 years after its first ascent) and considered a "holy grail" of mountaineering prizes.
- First alpine-style (or unsupported) ascent. In 2008, the charter of the prestigious Piolet d'Or prize was amended to focus on small teams with no support making fast, but riskier, ascents on routes that had previously been done by expeditions (called alpine style). Multiple Piolet d'Or winners, whose ascents embodied this style, included Marko Prezelj, Mick Fowler, and Ueli Steck. The charter was amended to de-incentivize excessive risk-taking after several winners died (e.g. David Lama, and Hansjörg Auer).
- First solo ascent. The most dangerous form of alpine-style ascent is the solo climbing ascent, performed by a single climber. The first solo ascents of the alpine north faces, including the first solo winter ascents, were coveted (the winter solo "Trilogy" was completed by Ivano Ghirardini in 1977–78); one of the most famous practitioners was the Italian Walter Bonatti. Himalayan solo ascents are also coveted, although problems around verification are more frequent due to the more remote nature of the routes, with notable disputes such as Tomo Česen's first solo ascent of the south face of Lhotse.

== In rock climbing ==
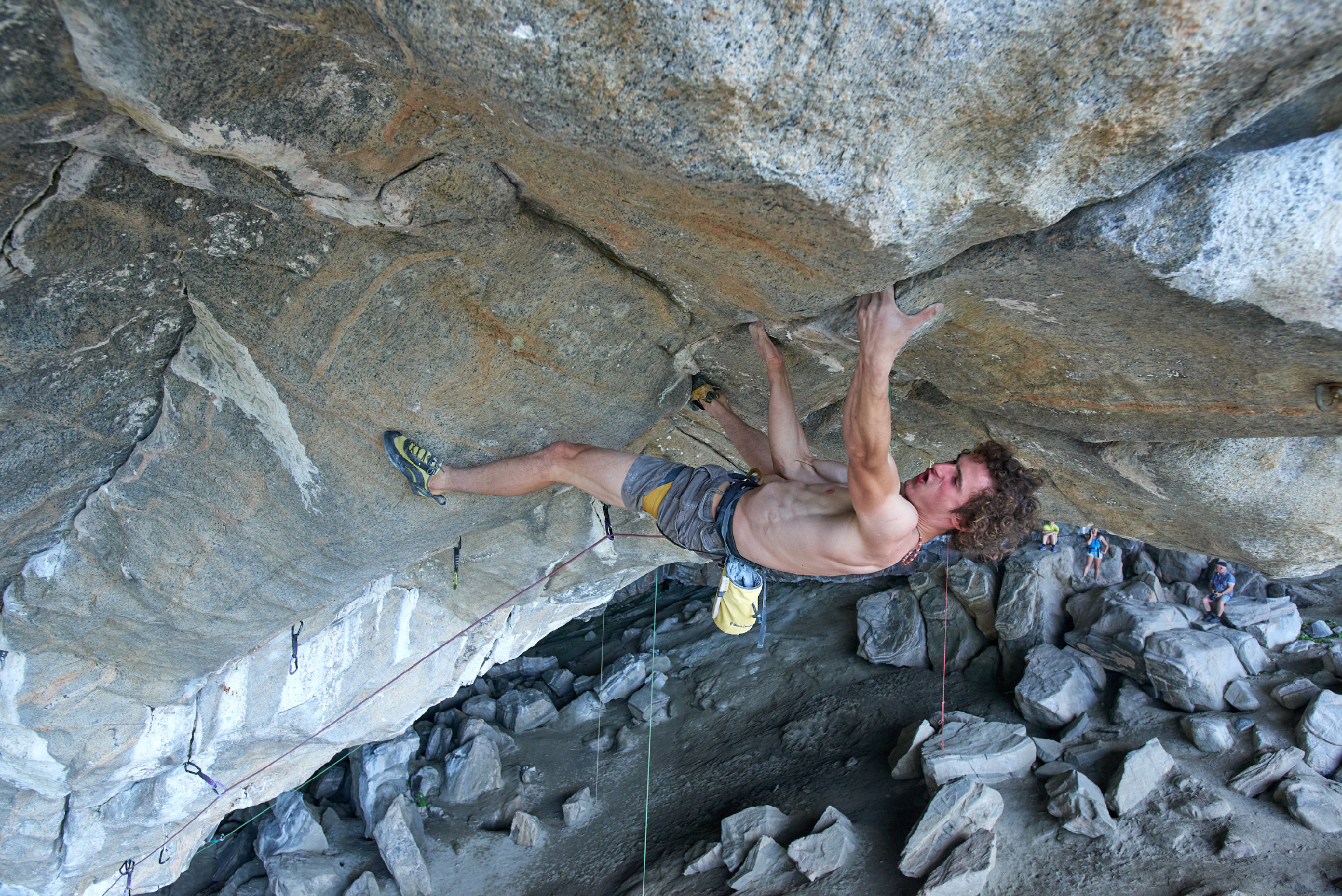
Adam Ondra making the first redpoint ascent of Silence, the world's first 9c (5.15d) sport climb.

In rock climbing, how the first free ascent was achieved became important to chronicle by journals and magazines. The key differentiators were the format in which the route was free climbed (e.g. traditional climbing, sport climbing, or free solo climbing), whether the free climb was done on the first attempt (e.g. onsighted), and whether the climber had prior information (e.g. beta) on that first attempt.

The most notable types of rock-climbing first ascents that are chronicled are:

- First free ascent (traditional climbing). Pre-1980s, all FFAs were by traditional climbing. A distinction was recorded if a climber practiced the moves on a top rope — called "headpointing" — but with the post-1980s dominance of "redpointing" as the definition of an FFA, such a distinction was dropped. (Note: While headpointing was once considered a lesser form of first free ascent in traditional climbing (and an FFA that had been headpointed would be asterisked as such), leading traditional climbers eventually followed the redpointing practices of sport climbers (i.e. practicing the route over-and-over in a safe way), and dispensed with the stigma associated with headpointing.) FFAs that set new grade milestones are notable, for both male and female climbers.

- First greenpoint ascent (traditional climbing). In the 2010s, traditional climbers called the ascent of a pre-bolted sport-climbing route with only "traditional protection" (i.e. protection that is not fixed via pre-placed bolts or pitons), a greenpoint. A notable example was Sonnie Trotter's greenpoint of The Path (5.14a R, 2007).

- First redpoint ascent (sport climbing). In the 1980s, climbers wanted to ascend routes that had no cracks for using traditional climbing protection, and they had to be protected by drilling permanent bolts, which became known as sport climbing, and which has since set all new grade milestones in rock climbing. The "redpoint" became the consensus definition for a "first free ascent" in sport climbing.
- First repeat ascent (traditional or sport climbing). The grading of a route can be complicated as the person making the FFA had no prior information or beta. The first repeat is therefore chronicled for confirmation of a grade, particularly when a new grade milestone is proposed. For the highest grades, the first repeat can take years (e.g. Action Directe or Jumbo Love), or even decades (e.g. Open Air).
- First onsight ascent (traditional or sport climbing). An FFA that was onsighted, was done at the very first attempt, and without prior information (or beta). Climbing journals chronicle the progression of grade milestones for onsights for both male and female climbers.

- First flash ascent (traditional or sport climbing). An FFA that was flashed, was done at the first attempt, but with prior information (or beta). With the widespread availability of online route beta (e.g. detailed videos), the distinction between onsight and flash ascents has diminished.

- First free solo ascent (independent of traditional or sport climbing). Free soloing is practiced by a smaller community of climbers and is a controversial area given the risks undertaken and whether such risks should be recorded and implicitly endorsed. Free solo climbing grade milestones are chronicled, notable such as in Free Solo, Alex Honnold's first free solo ascent of Freerider in Yosemite.

=== Gender ===
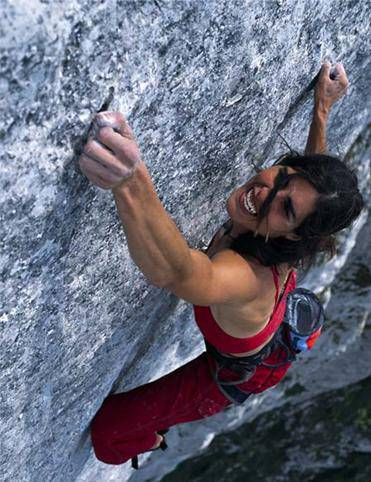
Josune Bereziartu on the FFA and FFFA of Yeah Man (8b+ 5.14a, 300-metres, 9 pitches), on the Grand Pfad in Bern, Switzerland

First female free ascent (abbreviated FFFA). Important female climbers emerged in the 1980s including Lynn Hill and Catherine Destivelle and climbing journals began to chronicle milestones in female first free ascents. In some cases, an FFFA is also an FFA, the most famous example being Lynn Hill's 1993 FFA/FFFA of the 3,000-foot Nose on El Capitan (5.14a/b), considered the biggest prize in big wall climbing, announced by Hill to the world's climbing media by: "It goes, boys". By the 2000s, Josune Bereziartu, Angela Eiter, and Ashima Shiraishi closed the gap to the highest sport climbing grades achieved by men to within one/two notches, while Beth Rodden had fully closed the gap for traditional climbing.

== Notable disputes ==
There have been notable disputes over claims of a first ascent (or first free ascent), for various reasons (disputes over the style employed, issues with verifiability, accusations of bad faith and fraud), and the most notable are where a new grade milestone or major advancement in difficulty is being proposed:

=== Mountaineering ===
- First ascent of Everest: Arguably the most famous case of an unverified first ascent is whether George Mallory and Andrew Irvine reached the summit of Everest on the 1924 Everest expedition. Subsequent Everest expeditions have not been able to answer the question, including the 1999 Mallory and Irvine Research Expedition and the 2007 Altitude Everest expedition.
- First ascent of Cerro Torre: In 1959, Cesare Maestri claimed he and Toni Egger summited, but that Egger, who had the camera, was swept to his death by an avalanche on the descent. Lionel Terry called it "the greatest climbing feat of all time". Inconsistencies in Maestri's account, and the lack of equipment on the route, led most to doubt his claim. Maestri further inflamed the controversy by returning in 1970 and drilling 400 bolts onto his new Compressor Route, to claim the second ascent. In 2012, yet more controversy followed when American climbers Hayden Kennedy and Jason Kruk removed Maestri's bolts, enabling David Lama and Peter Ortner to make the FFA, for which all four won a 2013 Piolet d'Or.

=== Rock climbing ===
- In 1995, French climber Fred Rouhling created a major controversy when he proposed Akira as the world's first-ever 9b (5.15b) route, when the highest grade at the time, Action Directe, was only at 9a (5.14d). Rouhling faced an unprecedented level of personal vilification from parts of the climbing community on whether he had actually climbed the route, as all other attempts had failed. In 2020, Sébastien Bouin made the first repeat of Akira and estimated its grade at 9a (5.14d), a grade Rouhling has climbed on other routes, and thus his FFA became accepted.
- In 2003, Spanish climber Bernabé Fernández proposed Chilam Balam as the world's first-ever 9b+ (5.15c) route, when the highest grade at the time, Realization, was at 9a+ (5.15a). As with Fred Rouhling on Akira, his claim provoked a significant backlash from parts of the climbing community and even accusations that he never completed an FFA (the person who belayed him could not be identified to help verification). The route was repeated in 2011 by Adam Ondra who downgraded it, and further repeats reduced its grade to circa 9a+ (5.15a).

== See also ==
- List of first ascents in the Alps
  - First ascent of the Matterhorn
- List of first ascents of mountain summits
- List of first ascents of eight-thousander mountains
- List of grade milestones in rock climbing
