= Upretia squamulosa =

Scientific classification
- Kingdom: Fungi
- Division: Ascomycota
- Class: Lecanoromycetes
- Order: Teloschistales
- Family: Teloschistaceae
- Genus: Upretia
- Species: U. squamulosa

Binomial name
- Upretia squamulosa Y.Y.Zhang & Li S.Wang (2019)
- Holotype site: Zhehai Town, Yunnan

Species of lichen

Upretia squamulosa is a species of saxicolous (rock-dwelling), squamulose (scaly) lichen in the family Teloschistaceae. It was identified as a new species in 2019 from specimens collected in the hot, dry valleys of the Jinsha River system in Yunnan, China, in the hot, dry valleys of the Jinsha River system, at elevations between about 1,240 and 3,160 metres. The lichen forms greyish green to brown scaly growths up to 7 cm across on rock surfaces. It is distinguished chemically by the presence of gyrophoric and lecanoric acids.

== Taxonomy ==
The lichen was scientifically described as a new species in 2019 by Yan Yun Zhang and Li Song Wang. The species epithet refers to its squamulose (scaly) thallus. The type specimen of Upretia squamulosa was collected in Yunnan Province, China, specifically in Huize County, Zhehai Town, at an elevation of 1,720 m (5,640 ft).

Upretia was proposed as a genus within the subfamily Caloplacoideae of the family Teloschistaceae in 2017. In a 2023 molecular study based on internal transcribed spacer sequences, Upretia was recovered as a strongly supported monophyletic genus, sister to Ioplaca pindarensis. In the same analysis, Upretia squamulosa was represented by multiple Chinese specimens, and a clade of newly collected southwestern Chinese material (later described as U. zeorina) was recovered as sister to U. squamulosa.

== Description ==
Upretia squamulosa is characterised by its squamulose, epilithic thallus that ranges in colour from greyish green to brown. The squamules are convex, sometimes resembling a bullet shape, with their apex often free from the substrate. This species has lecanorine apothecia, which are pale brown to brown in colour, and polarilocular ascospores. In cross-section, the apothecia often show an inner proper margin (about 25–50 μm thick), and the thalline margin is usually present early but may become less distinct as the apothecia develop. The thallus and apothecia contain gyrophoric and lecanoric acids, but no anthraquinones are found in the apothecia.

The thallus of Upretia squamulosa is saxicolous and squamulose, without an effigurate margin, and can grow up to 7 cm (2.8 in) in diameter. The upper surface is non-pruinose, smooth, and without cracks. The hymenium of the apothecia is colourless and the epihymenium is pale brown. The species does not form pycnidia.

Upretia squamulosa is similar to Upretia zeorina but differs in having greyish green to brown, non-pruinose, imbricate squamules and generally larger apothecia with a pale brown to brown disc; it also produces lecanoric acid in addition to gyrophoric acid.

== Habitat and distribution ==
Upretia squamulosa grows on rocky substrates in arid habitats at 1,240 to 3,160 m (4,070 to 10,370 ft) elevation. It is known only from Yunnan, China, from the type locality in Huize County and additional sites including Yulong County. The species occurs in the hot, dry valleys of the Jinsha-jiang River system, where shrub vegetation supports a diverse lichen flora.
