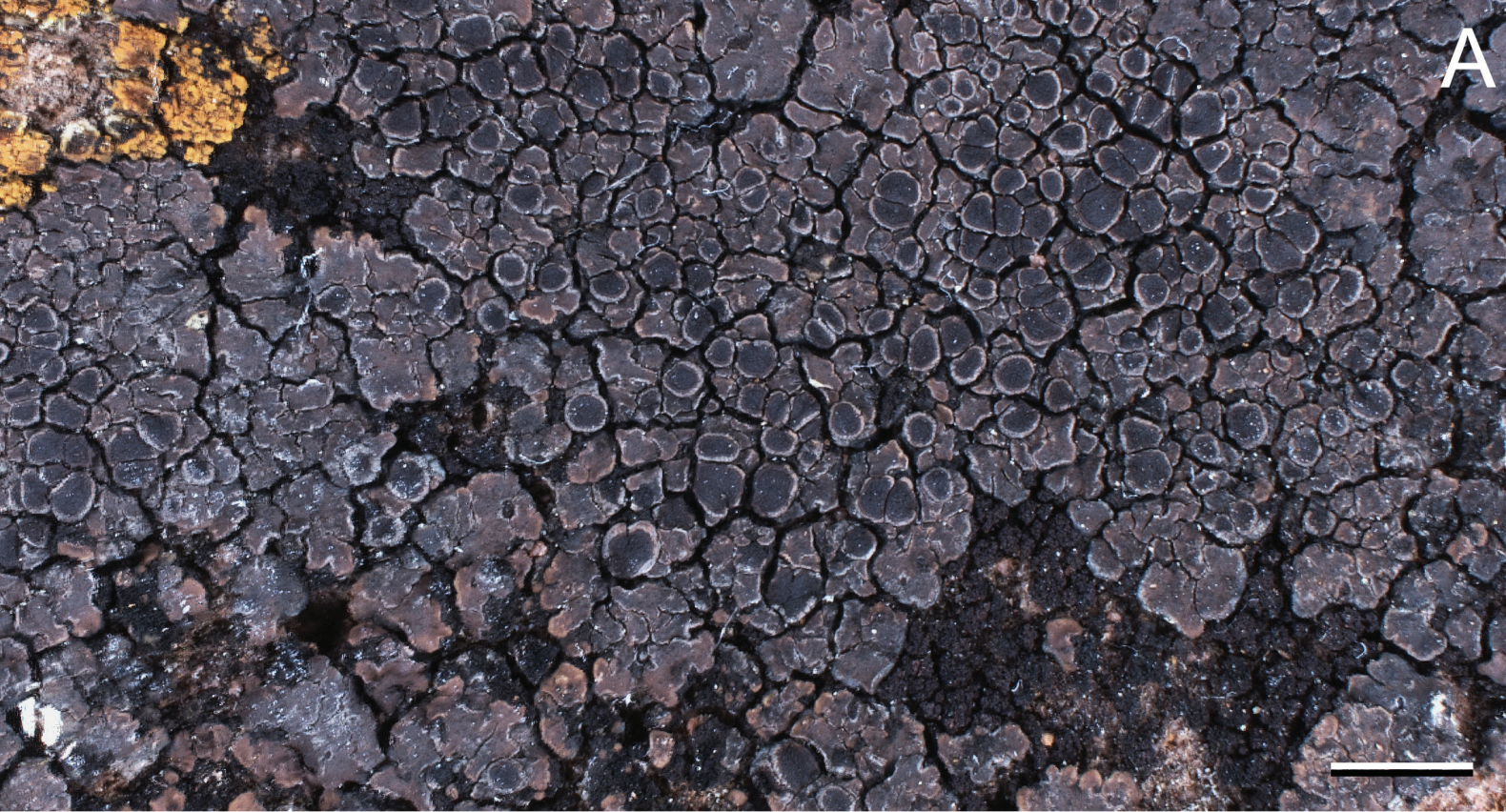
- Upretia zeorina; scale bar: 2 mm

Scientific classification
- Kingdom: Fungi
- Division: Ascomycota
- Class: Lecanoromycetes
- Order: Teloschistales
- Family: Teloschistaceae
- Genus: Upretia; S.Y.Kondr., A.Thell & J.S.Hur (2017)

Type species
- Upretia amarkantakana (Y.Joshi & Upreti) S.Y.Kondr. & A.Thell (2017)

Species
- U. amarkantakana U. hueana U. squamulosa U. zeorina U. xizangensis

= Upretia =

Genus of lichen-forming fungi

Upretia is a genus of lichen-forming fungi in the family Teloschistaceae. Species in this genus form rounded, crust-like growths on rock, typically olive-grey to brownish grey in colour, with lobed or scale-like margins. The genus is known from India and China, with one species also recorded from Mexico, and currently includes five described species. It occurs on exposed rock in habitats ranging from low-elevation bauxite outcrops and arid valley systems to high-elevation alpine deserts on the Tibetan Plateau. A 2023 molecular study confirmed the genus as a distinct lineage, with its closest relative being the Himalayan genus Ioplaca.

== Taxonomy ==
Upretia was circumscribed by the lichenologists Sergey Kondratyuk, Arne Thell, and Jae-Seoun Hur in 2017, with Upretia amarkantakana assigned as the type species. Upretia is a member of the subfamily Caloplacoideae of the Teloschistaceae. The genus is named in honour of the Indian lichenologist Dalip Kumar Upreti, recognizing his contributions to the study of Indian lichens.

A 2023 phylogenetic study based on internal transcribed spacer (ITS) sequences recovered Upretia as a well-supported monophyletic genus, with Ioplaca as its closest sampled relative. In that analysis, the newly described Chinese species U. zeorina formed a distinct lineage that was sister to U. squamulosa. The authors also noted that available sequence data leave the limits of the type species U. amarkantakana unclear, and that broader sampling will be needed to settle its circumscription. Two further Chinese collections (referred to as Upretia sp. 1 and sp. 2) were treated as distinct but were left undescribed because each is known from only a single specimen.

In 2025, Yang and colleagues described Upretia xizangensis from the Tibet Autonomous Region of China (Tibet), based on material collected on rock at about 2,742–3,011 m elevation. In an ITS-based phylogenetic analysis, the new species was recovered within Upretia with strong support, in a clade associated with three other members of the genus (with U. hueana outside that grouping).

The monotypic genus Ioplaca from the eastern Himalayas differs from Upretia in thallus colour, areolae structure, and apothecial characters.

== Description ==
The genus Upretia is characterized by a crustose thallus that is typically orbicular in shape and ranges from lobate to somewhat squamulose in form. The central part of the thallus often has a subsquamulose appearance but can sometimes be areolate to verruculose. Its colour varies from olive-grey to brownish grey or ash-grey. The thalline lobes of Upretia are generally narrow to wide, branched, and have a flat to slightly convex surface, often covered with a fine dusting known as pruina.

The outermost layer of the thallus, or cortical layer, is thin and made of tightly interwoven cells (paraplectenchymatous). The uppermost cells in this layer are typically brownish, but there is no distinct epinecral layer. The inner layer of the thallus, or medulla, is white. Both a prothallus and hypothallus are usually present and are characterized by their black colour.

The apothecia of Upretia are lecanorine to zeorine in form, and in some species the thalline margin is present early in development but an inner proper margin becomes visible later (especially in cross-section). The disc colour varies by species, ranging from bright orange or brownish orange through to dark brown or blackish. The true exciple, the layer beneath the thalline margin, also has a paraplectenchymatous structure. The paraphyses, or sterile filaments within the apothecia, contain oil droplets. Each ascus typically contains eight spores. These ascospores are clear (hyaline) and polarilocular, meaning they are divided into two components (locules) separated by a central septum with a hole. The conidia, or asexual spores, are narrowly bacilliform (rod-shaped) and small.

Standard spot test reactions vary among species. The thallus is typically K−, but taxa with gyrophoric acid can show a C+ (red) reaction in the thallus or thalline margin. In U. xizangensis, the thallus is K− and C+ (red), while the apothecial surface and epihymenium are K+ purple-red. In the type species (described as Caloplaca amarkantakana), parietin and an additional olive spot at R_{F} class 4 have been reported from the apothecial disc. Reported secondary metabolites in the genus include gyrophoric acid (sometimes with lecanoric acid) and, in some taxa, parietin.

== Habitat and distribution ==
In China, Upretia has been recorded from exposed rock in arid valley habitats in provinces such as Sichuan and Yunnan, and also from the Xizang Autonomous Region on the Qinghai–Xizang Plateau. Upretia xizangensis grows on rock in alpine desert habitats at about 2,742–3,011 m elevation. Upretia zeorina grows on exposed rock in arid valleys along the Jinsha River, at elevations of about 1,520 to 1,880 m (4,990 to 6,170 ft), and is known from Sichuan and Yunnan. Upretia amarkantakana grows on sun-exposed bauxite rocks. It is found in the Madhya Pradesh region of India, specifically in the Anuppur, Dindori, and Shahdol districts around the Amarkantak area. This species is typically found at elevations ranging from 500 to 600 m (1,600 to 2,000 ft). It is often found in the company of species from the genera Buellia and Staurothele. Upretia hueana is known from India (including Madhya Pradesh), and also been recorded from Mexico. Upretia squamulosa grows in arid environments and has a broader elevation range, from 1,240 to 3,160 m (4,070 to 10,370 ft). Its distribution is limited to Yunnan in China, marking a significant geographical distinction from the other members of the genus in India.

== Species ==
Five species are recognized in Upretia:

- Upretia amarkantakana (Y.Joshi & Upreti) S.Y.Kondr. & A.Thell (2017)
- Upretia hueana (B.de Lesd.) S.Y.Kondr. & Upreti (2020)
- Upretia squamulosa Y.Y.Zhang & Li S.Wang (2019)
- Upretia xizangensis Q.X.Yang & X.L.Wei (2025)
- Upretia zeorina L.J.Li & Printzen (2023)
