= List of dams on the Brahmaputra River =

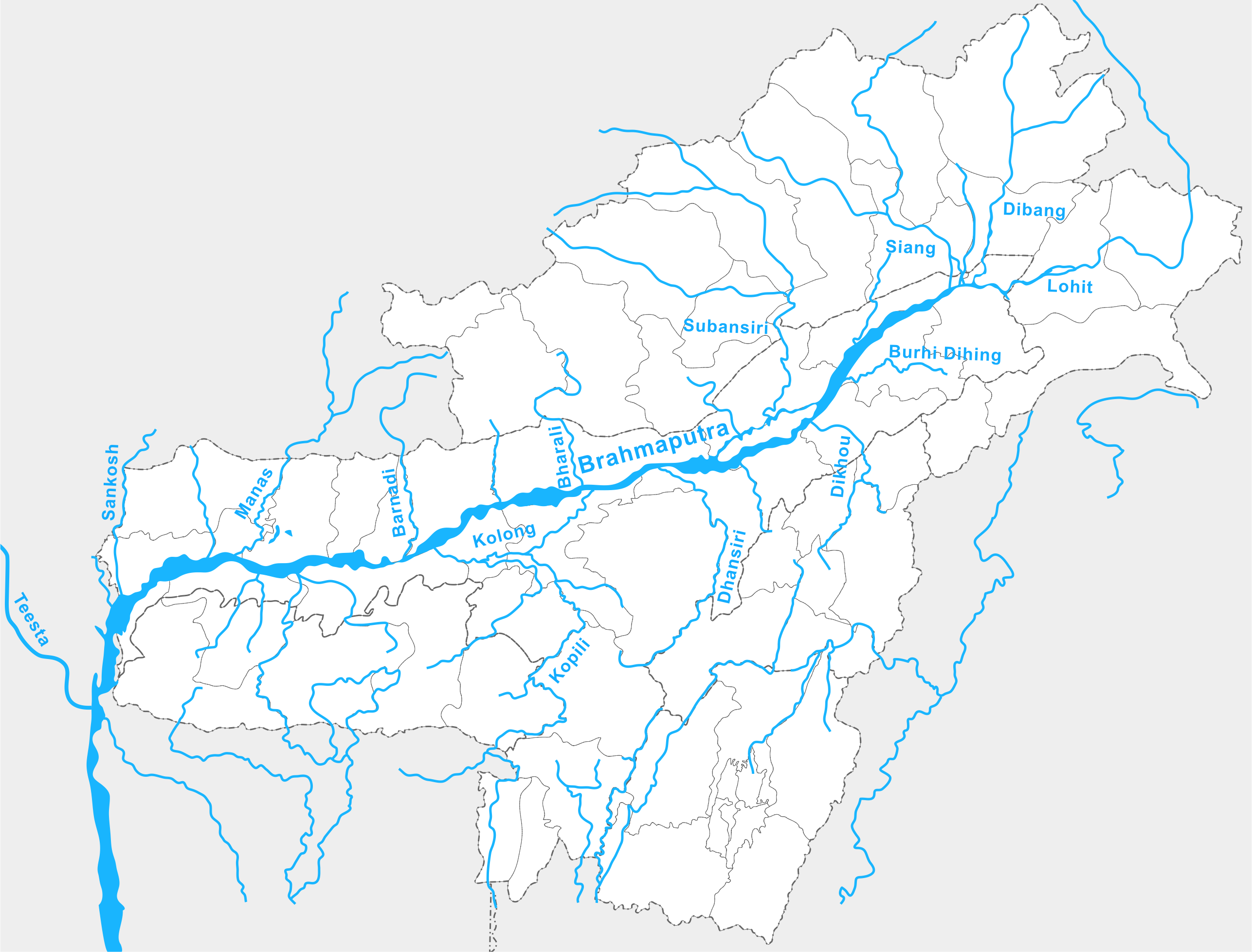
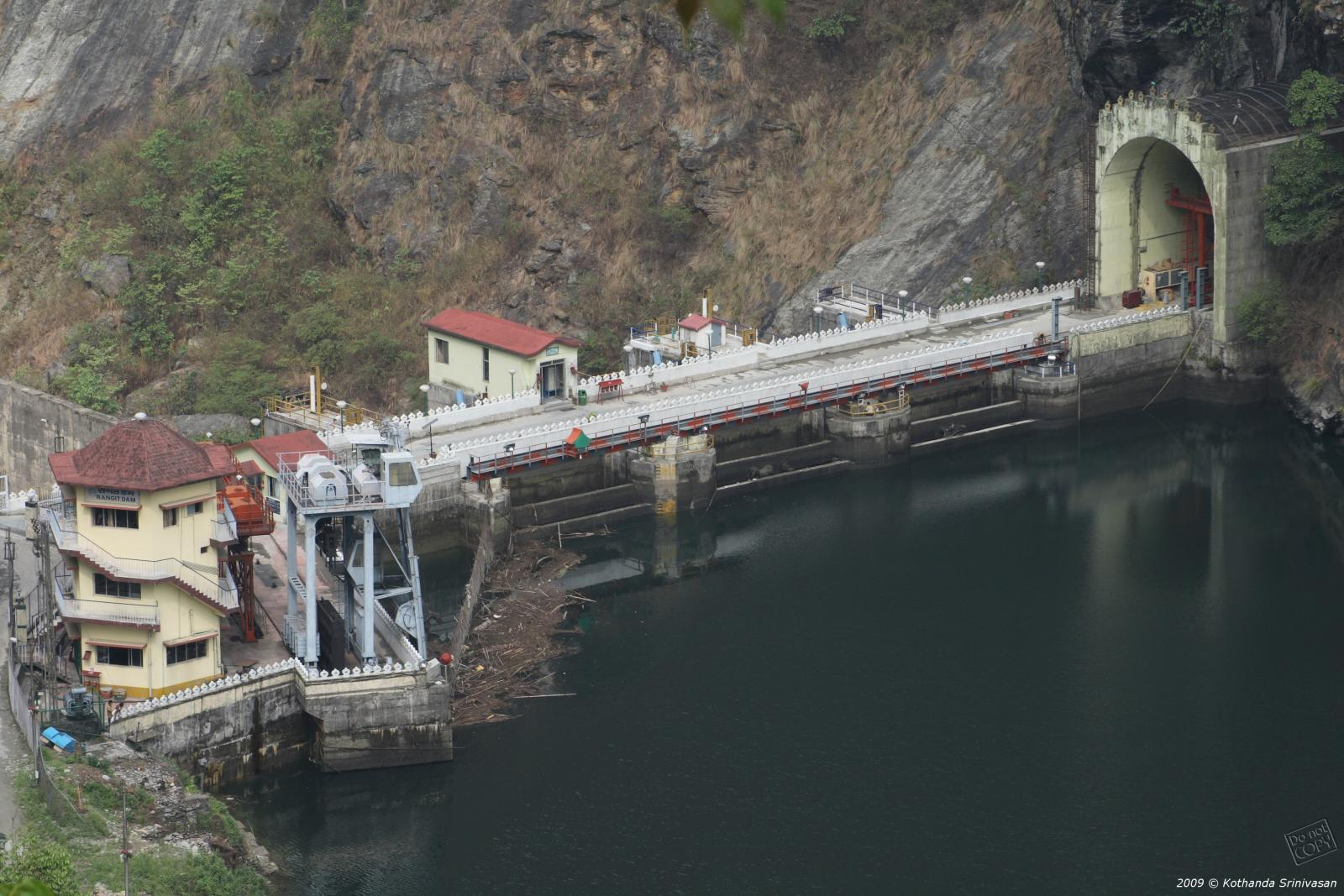
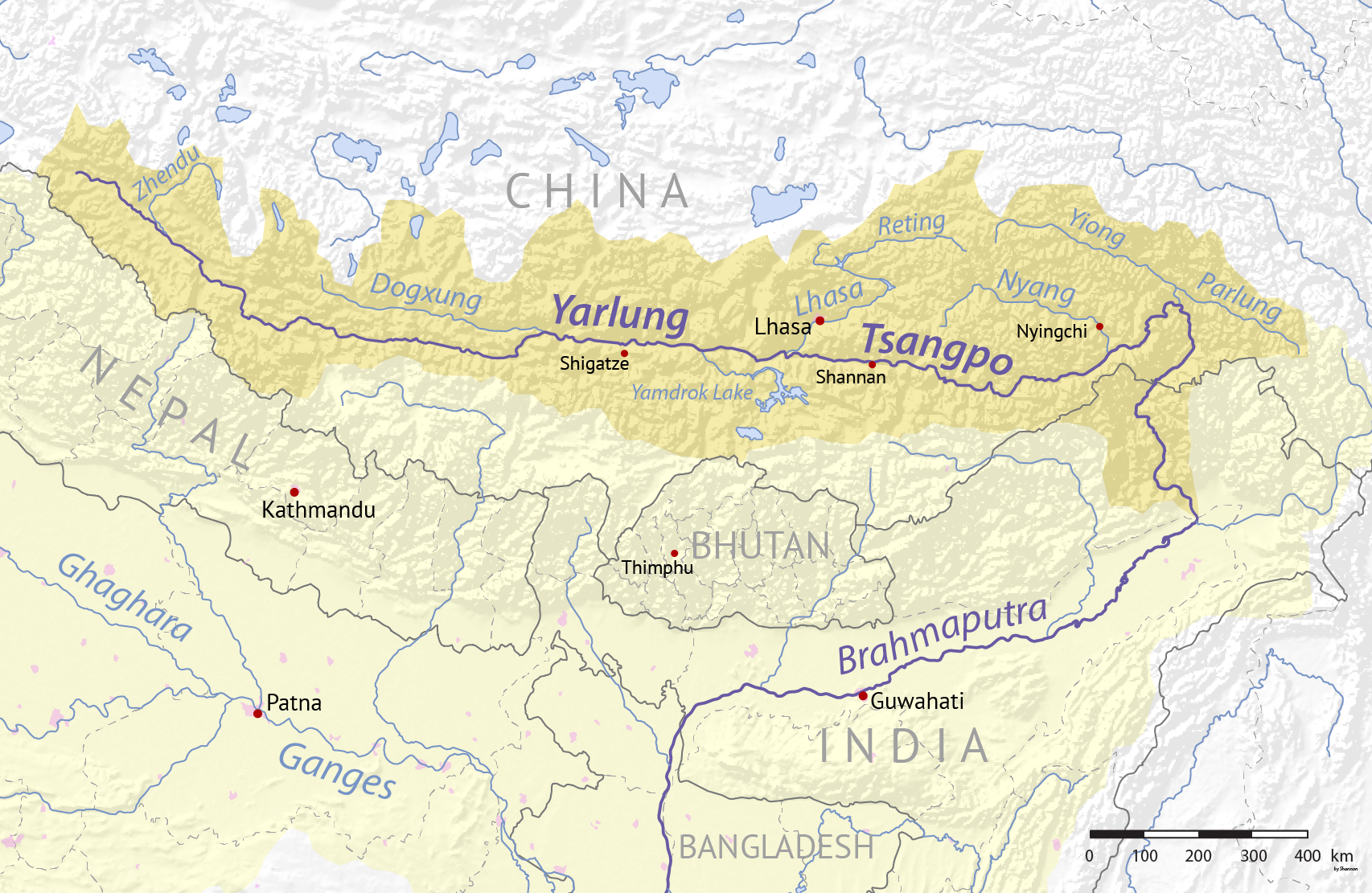
- Top left: Brahmaputra basin in India
- Top right: Rangit Dam and reservoir on Rangeet River
- Bottom left: Map of the Yarlung Tsangpo River watershed which drains the north slope of the Himalayas.

This is a list of dams on the Brahmaputra River and hydro–infrastructure in the Brahmaputra River Basin which is a key constituent of the Ganges-Brahmaputra basin of Himalayan rivers. Brahmaputra originates near Mount Kailash, flows through Tibet where it is called Yarlung Tsangpo. It enters India in Arunachal Pradesh in Eastern Himalaya, and then enters Bangladesh where it is called Jamuna (not to be mistaken with Yamuna tributary of Ganges in India). It finally flows into the Bay of Bengal where it merges with the Ganges at Sunderban Delta.

== List of dams and other hydro–infrastructure ==
Upstream to downstream

Name	Location	Year Completed	Notes/Ref
China
Yamdrok Hydropower Station	29.2641°N 90.6064°E	1998	
Pangduo Hydro Power Station	30.183°N 91.353°E	2013	
Zhikong Hydro Power Station	29°58′6.78″N 91°52′36.55″E	2007	
Zangmu Dam	29°11′06″N 92°31′00″E	2015	
Jiacha Hydropower Station	29°08′23″N 92°32′48″E	2020	
Lalho Hydroelectric Project	Xiabuqu river, Shigatse	2019	
Proposed: Lengda Hydro Power Station, Zhongda Hydro Power Station, Langzhen Hydro Power Station, Jeixu Dam and Jiexu Hydro Power Station, Dagu Dam and Dagu Hydro Power Station, Bayu Hydro Power Station, Lalho Dam and Lalho Hydroelectric Project, Medog Hydropower Station
Bhutan
Chukha Hydropower Project		1988	336 MW
Tala Hydroelectric Power Station		2007	1020 MW
Kurichhu Hydropower Project		2002	60 MW
Basochhu Hydropower Project		2004	40 MW
Other related projects: Punatsangchhu-I Hydroelectric Project (1200 MW), Punatsangchhu-II Hydroelectric Project (1040 MW), Dagachhu Hydropower Project (126 MW), Jaldhaka hydroelectric plant (18 MW), Gyetsha Mini-Hydel (1.8 MW).
Proposed:
India
Subansiri Lower Dam	27°33′13″N 94°15′31″E	2026	2000 MW
Ranganadi Dam	27°20′34″N 93°49′0″E	2001	405 MW
Rangit Dam	27°17′41″N 88°17′32″E	2000	60 MW
Etalin Hydroelectric project	Dibang Valley district, Arunachal Pradesh	(2032 target)	3087MW
Dibang Dam	28°20′15″N 95°46′15″E	(2032 target)	2880MW
Oju Hydroelectric project	Kra Daadi district, Arunachal Pradesh	(2032 target)	2220MW
Kameng			600 MW
Pare			110 MW
Kopoli			110 MW
Khandong			50 MW
Karbi Langpi			100 MW
Tato-I	28.45°N 94.02°E	(2029 expected)	186 MW
Tato-II	28.5072°N 94.3618°E	(2032 expected)	700 MW
Heo Hydroelectric Project	Meying, Payum, West Siang district, Arunachal Pradesh	(2030 expected)	240 MW
Teesta Low Dam-III	27.0018057°N 88.4404352°E		132 MW
Teesta Low Dam-IV	26.9339354°N 88.4470021°E		160 MW
Teesta-V			510 MW
Teesta-III			1200 MW
Chujachen			110 MW
Dikchu			96 MW
Tashiding			97 MW
Jorethang Loop			96 MW
Rongnichu			113 MW
Doyang			75 MW
Kyrdemkulai			60 MW
Umiam St. I			36 MW
New Umtru			40 MW
Umiam St. IV			60 MW
Myntdu St-I			126 MW
Other related projects: Upper Siang Hydroelectric Project, Tipaimukh Dam, Dihing River Irrigation Project, Hawrapur Irrigation Project, Teesta Barrage, Mayurakshi project, Kangshabati project
Proposed: Doyang Hydro Electric station
Bangladesh
Barakhata Teesta Barrage			

== Map ==
Hydro infrastructure on the Brahmaputra River, the Brahmaputra River Basin and Brahmaputra River tributaries

== See also ==
- China's South–North Water Transfer Project
- Dams and reservoirs in China
- Geology of the Himalaya
- India's National Projects of the Ministry of Water Resources
- Indian Rivers Inter-link
- List of rivers in Bangladesh
