= Longkaikou Dam =

Gravity dam on the Jinsha River, China

- Location within China
- Country: China
- Coordinates: 26°31′57″N 100°24′58″E
- Status: Under construction
- Construction began: 2007
- Opening date: 2013
- Owner: Huadian Power

Dam and spillways
- Type of dam: Gravity, roller-compacted concrete
- Impounds: Jinsha River
- Height: 119 m (390 ft)
- Length: 798 m (2,618 ft)

Reservoir
- Creates: Longkaikou Reservoir
- Total capacity: 544,000,000 m^{3} (441,028 acre⋅ft)

Power Station
- Commission date: May–November 2013
- Turbines: 5 x 360 MW Francis-type
- Installed capacity: 1,800 MW
- Annual generation: 7.82 billion kWh (est.)

The Longkaikou Dam is a gravity dam on the Jinsha River in Dali Bai Autonomous Prefecture, Yunnan province, China. The dam has a height of 119 m (390 ft) and was constructed with roller-compacted concrete. Construction on the dam began in 2007, the river was diverted in January 2009 but construction was briefly halted in June 2009 by the Ministry of Environmental Protection after it was being constructed without approval. On 25 November 2012, the reservoir was impounded and the first of five 360 MW Francis turbine-generators was commissioned on 21 May 2013. The last was commissioned on 29 November 2013. The dam was expected to displace 2,000 people. The dam also supports a fish proliferation system.

== See also ==
- List of power stations in China
