= Xiaojiang River (Yunnan) =

River in Yunnan province, China

Coordinates: 26°32′47″N 103°03′21″E

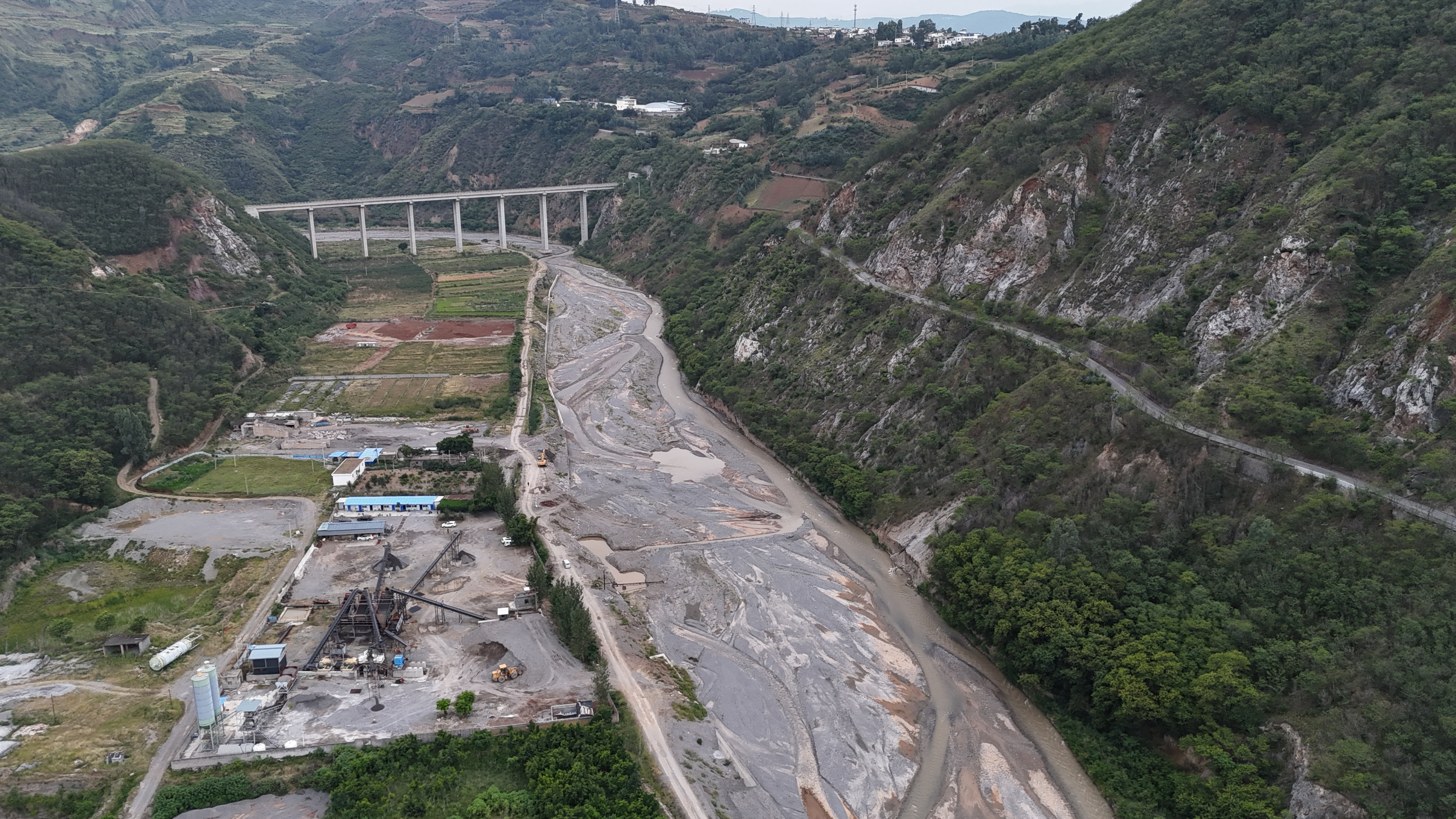
Xiaojiang River near Dongchuan

The Xiaojiang River (Chinese: 小江; pinyin: Xiǎo Jiāng) is a right-bank tributary of the Jinsha River in northern Yunnan Province of China. It begins at the outflow of Lake Qingshuihai and flows through Xundian Hui and Yi Autonomous County, Dongchuan District and Huize County before draining into the Jinsha River. The Xiaojiang River runs 141 kilometres and its drainage area is 3049 square kilometres. Due to loose rock structure, sparse vegetation on the banks, and the well-developed dissected troughs, large-scale debris flows are common.
