= Suwalong Hydropower Station =

Hydropower station in China

Suwalong Hydropower Station 苏洼龙水电站
- Interactive map of Suwalong Hydropower Station 苏洼龙水电站
- Country: China
- Location: at the junction of Mangkam and Batang
- Purpose: Power, flood control, navigation
- Opening date: 2022
- Construction cost: ¥17.89 billion

The Suwalong Hydropower Station (Chinese: 苏洼龙水电站), is the hydropower project that is located in the upper reaches of the Jinsha River at the junction of Mangkam County in Tibet and Batang County in Sichuan. It is the first installed million-kilowatt-level hydropower station in Tibet.

With a total investment of ¥ 17.89 billion, the plant's total installed capacity is 1.2 million kilowatts, which is more than double that of the Zangmu Dam. Once completed, the project would generate 2,000 MW of power.

== History ==
In November, 2015, the National Development and Reform Commission officially approved the construct of Suwalong Hydropower Station.

On November 21, 2017, Suwalong Hydropower Station dammed the river.

The plant became fully operational in November 2022.
