= Guanyinyan Dam =

Dam on the Jinsha River in China

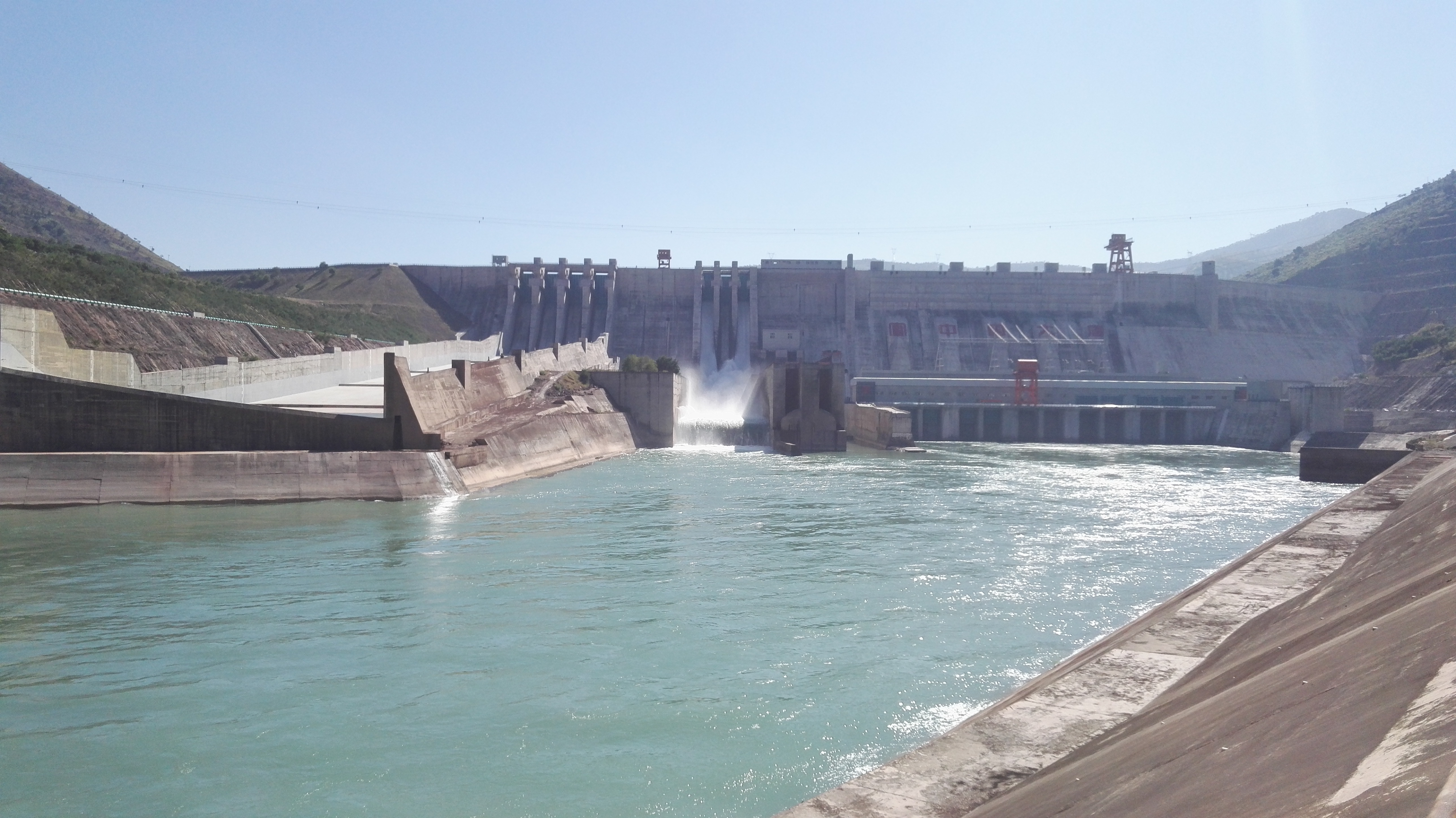
- The dam in November 2016

- Location within China
- Coordinates: 26°31′17″N 101°26′16″E
- Status: Complete, generators commissioning
- Construction began: 2008
- Opening date: 2014
- Owner: Datang Guanyinyan Hydropower Development Co.

Dam and spillways
- Type of dam: Gravity
- Impounds: Jinsha River
- Height: 159 m (522 ft)
- Length: 1,158 m (3,799 ft)
- Spillways: 3
- Spillway type: Service, controlled chute

Reservoir
- Creates: Guanyinyan Reservoir
- Total capacity: 2,072,000,000 m^{3} (1,679,798 acre⋅ft)

Power Station
- Commission date: 2014-2016 (est.)
- Turbines: 5 x 600 MW Francis turbines
- Installed capacity: 3,000 MW

The Guanyinyan Dam (Chinese: 观音岩水电站, lit. Guanyin Rock Dam) is a gravity dam on the Jinsha River 30 km (19 mi) southwest of Panzhihua on the border of Yunnan and Sichuan Provinces in China. The purpose of the dam is hydroelectric power generation and flood control. Construction on the dam started in 2008 and the river was diverted by 2010. The first generator was operational on 20 December 2014 and the fourth on 14 December 2015. The entire power station should be operational by 2016. When complete, the dam will support a 3,000 MW power station consisting of five 600 MW Francis turbine generators.

== Design ==
The Guanyinyan Dam is a 159 m (522 ft) tall and 1,158 m (3,799 ft) long gravity dam. Of the dam's length, 838 m (2,749 ft) is roller-compacted concrete and 320 m (1,050 ft) is rock-fill embankment with this portion having a maximum height of 71 m (233 ft). The crest elevation of the dam will be 1,141 m (3,743 ft) above sea level and contain the power plant at the toe of its body. A spillway and two discharge openings are also included in the design.

== See also ==
- List of power stations in China
