= Hao Xiaojiang =

Chinese scientist (born 1951)

- 郝小江
- Born: July 10, 1951 (age 75); Chongqing, China
- Education: Guizhou University; Kyoto University
- Scientific career
- Fields: Phytochemistry; Natural product
- Workplaces: Kunming Institute of Botany

Hao Xiaojiang (Chinese: 郝小江; pinyin: Hǎo Xiǎojiāng; born 10 July 1951) is a Chinese scientist currently working as a researcher, doctoral supervisor at the Kunming Institute of Botany.

== Biography ==
Hao was born in Chongqing on July 10, 1951. During the Cultural Revolution in December 1968, he became a sent-down youth in Qianxinan Buyei and Miao Autonomous Prefecture. In August 1971 he was transferred to a nitrogenous fertilizer plant as a worker. In 1973 he was accepted to Guizhou University, where he graduated in 1976. In 1985 he obtained his Master of Science degree from Kunming Institute of Botany, the Chinese Academy of Sciences (CAS). He earned his Doctor of Pharmacy degree from Kyoto University in 1990.

He was chairman of Kunming Institute of Botany from November 1997 to November 2001.

== Honours and awards ==
- 1995 National Science Fund for Distinguished Young Scholars
- 2017 Regional Innovation Award of the Ho Leung Ho Lee Foundation
- November 22, 2019 Member of the Chinese Academy of Sciences (CAS)
