= Zangmu Dam =

Dam in Tibet, China

- Location within China
- Official name: Zangmu Dam
- Location: Gyaca, Tibet Autonomous Region, China
- Coordinates: 29°11′06″N 92°31′00″E
- Status: Operational
- Construction began: 2009
- Opening date: 2014
- Construction cost: 9.7 billion yuan (US$1.2 billion)

Dam and spillways
- Type of dam: Gravity, concrete
- Impounds: Brahmaputra River
- Height: 116 m (381 ft)
- Length: 389 m (1,276 ft)
- Width (crest): 19 m (62 ft)
- Width (base): 76 m (249 ft)

Reservoir
- Active capacity: 86,600,000 m^{3} (70,208 acre⋅ft) (daily)
- Catchment area: 157,668 km^{2} (60,876 mi^{2})
- Normal elevation: 3,310 m (10,860 ft)

Power Station
- Commission date: 2014-2015
- Type: Run-of-the-river
- Hydraulic head: 53.5 m (176 ft) (nominal)
- Turbines: 6 x 85 MW Francis-type
- Installed capacity: 510 MW
- Annual generation: 2.5 billion kWh est.

The Zangmu Dam (藏木) is a gravity dam on the Yarlung Zangbo/Brahmaputra River 9 km (5.6 mi) northwest of Gyaca in the Tibet Autonomous Region of China. This dam is built a few kilometers from the Bhutan-India border. The purpose of the dam is hydroelectric power production using run-of-the-river technology. It is part of the Zangmu Hydropower Project and supports a 510 MW power station. Construction began in 2009 and the first generator was commissioned in November 2014. The last became operational on 13 October 2015. It is the first dam on the Brahmaputra/Yarlung Zangbo River and has caused controversy in India.

== Background ==
In 1972, the Chinese Academy of Sciences created the Qinghai-Tibet Plateau Comprehensive Scientific Expedition which in part studied conditions in the Tsangpo-Brahmaputra River basin. The study concluded that 114,000 MW of hydroelectric power generation capacity could be established in the basin, 79,000 MW from the main stem alone. A more in-depth hydrological study began in 1980 which identified 12 sites for dams. It was envisioned that the dams could alleviate power shortages in Lhasa. During the 1980s and 1990s, work failed to commence in the basin. Currently, there are 28 proposed dams in the basin, Zangmu being the only one approved for construction.

In April 2009, China's Gezhouba Group was awarded a $167 million contract for the Zangmu Hydropower Project. According to the company, the contract is for the design and construction of the dam along with its power house to control water flowing downstream to North Eastern India. The project will require 3,400,000 m^{3} (4,400,000 cu yd) of concrete and 8 million tons of aggregate. Specifications for the dam are uncertain as China has not shared much information. On 12 November 2010, the construction reached coffer dam river closure. The reservoir was impounded and the first generator was commissioned on 23 November 2014. The power station was declared fully operational on 13 October 2015.

=== Downstream concerns ===
As the Brahmaputra River flows into India and Bangladesh, China's plans to construct a dam on the river are not without controversy. Reportedly, China had previously denied that they were constructing a dam on the Brahmaputra River, even after the contract was awarded. In April 2010, Yang Jiechi, their Foreign Minister, officially revealed that they were in fact constructing the Zangmu Dam on the river. China has assured India that the dam is "a small project which will not have any impact on the river's downstream flow into North-East India." Indian officials such as the Arunachal Pradesh Power Minister Jabron Gamlin express that "China's constructing a dam is a cause of concern for us, but we are not certain how big this dam is and what effect it would have on people living downstream". Reportedly, China has refused requests to reduce the height of the dam but the Indian Minister of External Affairs at the time, S. M. Krishna, had asserted that India was not concerned with the dam due to its run-of-the-river design. In January 2013 China approved three more dams on the river as part of its Twelfth Five Year Plan. The Dagu (640 MW) and Jiexu (560 MW) dams will be constructed upstream of Zangmu and the Jiacha Dam (320 MW) downstream.

== Design ==
The Zangmu Dam is a 116 m (381 ft) tall and 389 m (1,276 ft) long concrete gravity-type. On its right bank is the spillway, plunge pool and bottom outlet (for silt). On the dam's left bank, the retaining dam section is 80 m (262 ft) tall and the power plant sits at its toe. The entire dam is 76 m (249 ft) wide at its base and 19 m (62 ft) wide at its crest. Sitting at the head of a 157,668 km^{2} (60,876 mi^{2}) catchment area, the dam's reservoir has a daily active capacity (pondage) of 86,600,000 m^{3} (70,208 acre⋅ft) and normal reservoir elevation of 3,310 m (10,860 ft). The dam's power station contains six 85 MW Francis turbine-generators for a total installed capacity of 510 MW.

== See also ==
- List of longest undammed rivers
- List of dams on the Brahmaputra River
- List of dams and reservoirs in China
