= Kristoffer Szilas =

Danish geologist and climber (born 1982)

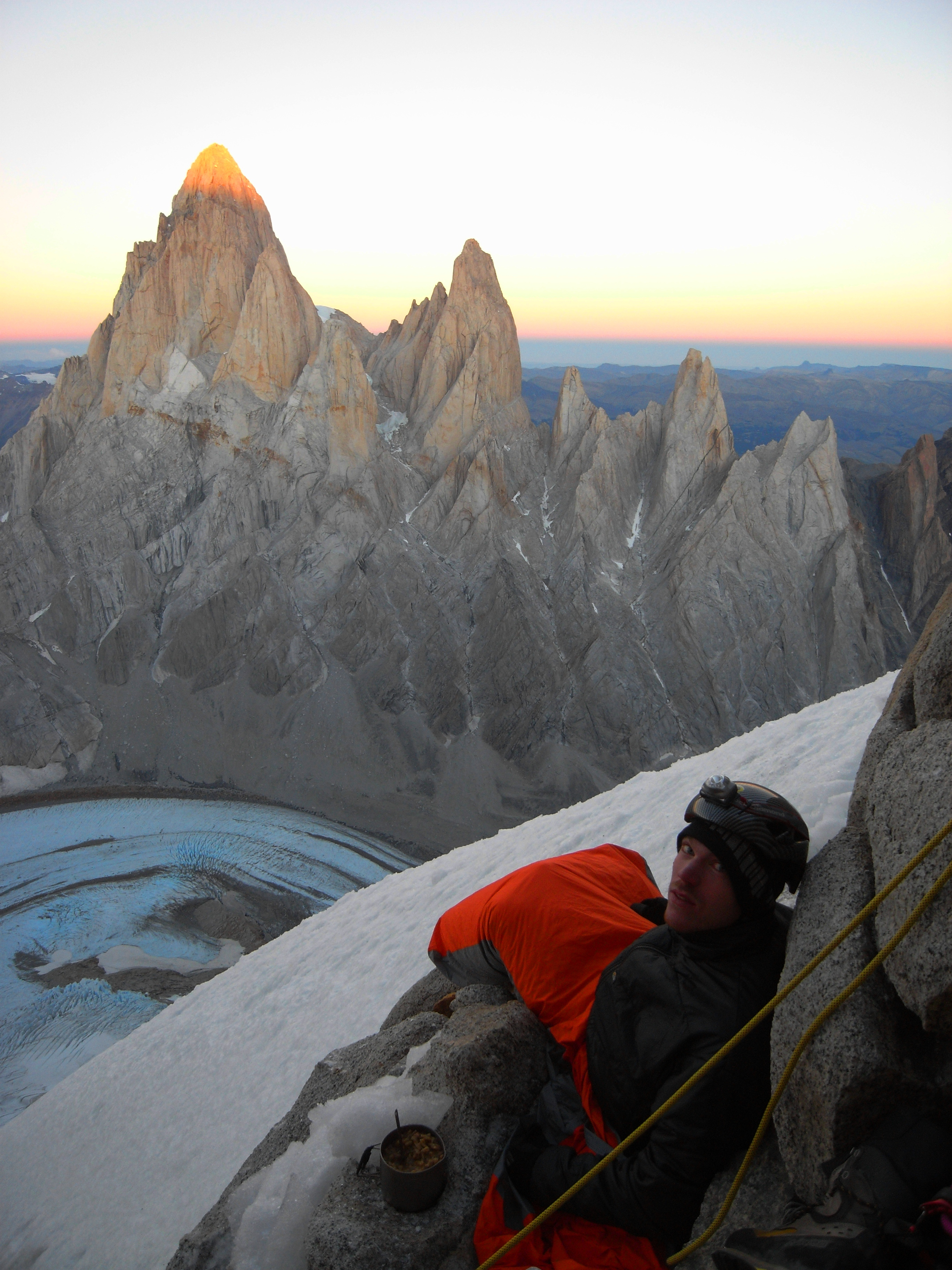
- Kristoffer Szilas at a bivouac during an ascent of Cerro Torre in Patagonia.
- Born: 7 July 1982 (age 43); Copenhagen, Denmark
- Education: Ph.D. in geology
- Alma mater: University of Copenhagen
- Occupations: Geologist and mountaineer
- Website: http://www.kristofferszilas.com

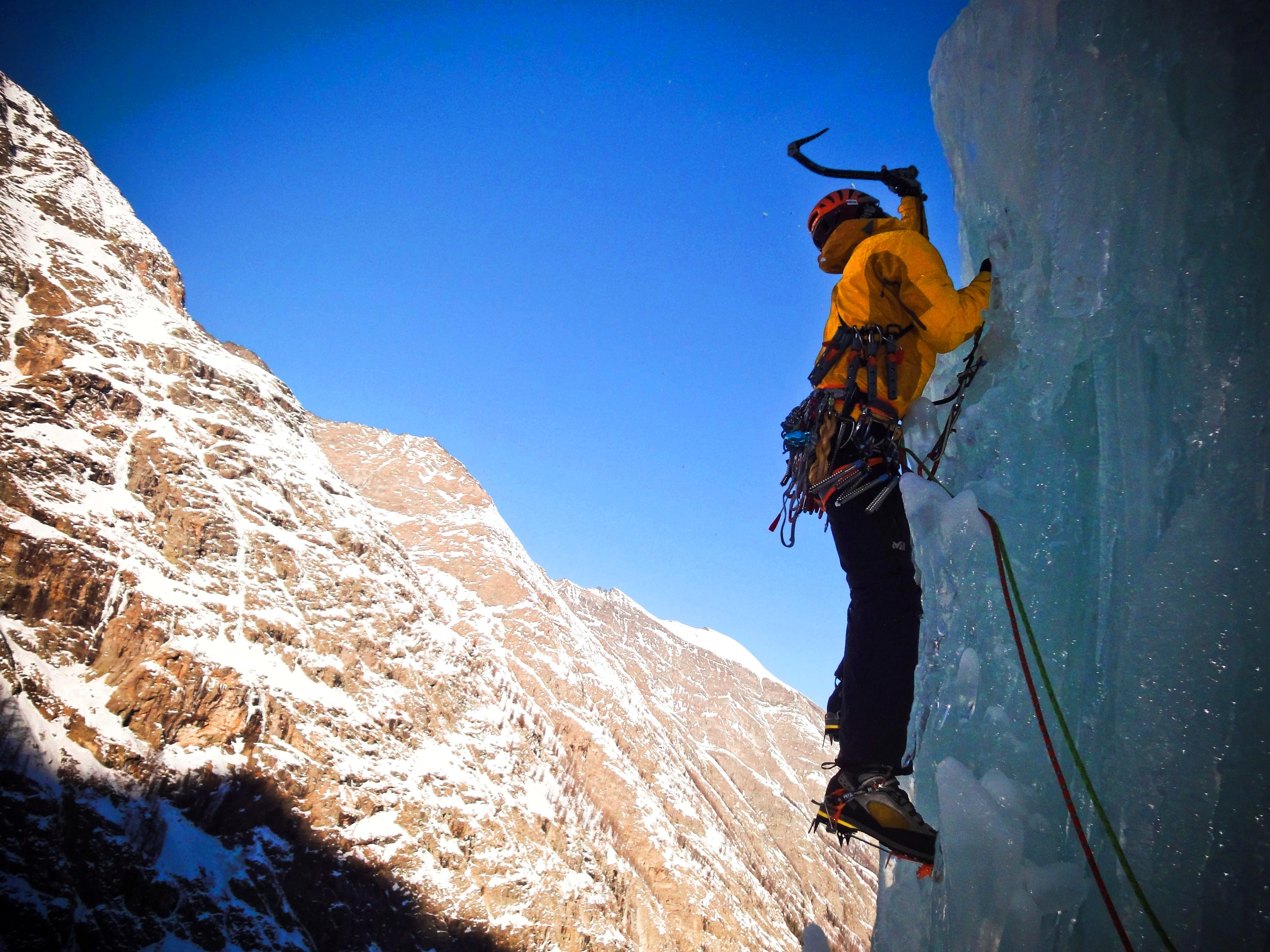
Kristoffer Szilas ice climbing.

Kristoffer Szilas (born 7 July 1982) is a Danish mountaineer and geologist of Hungarian descent who lived in the US from 2012 to 2016.

== Mountaineering ==
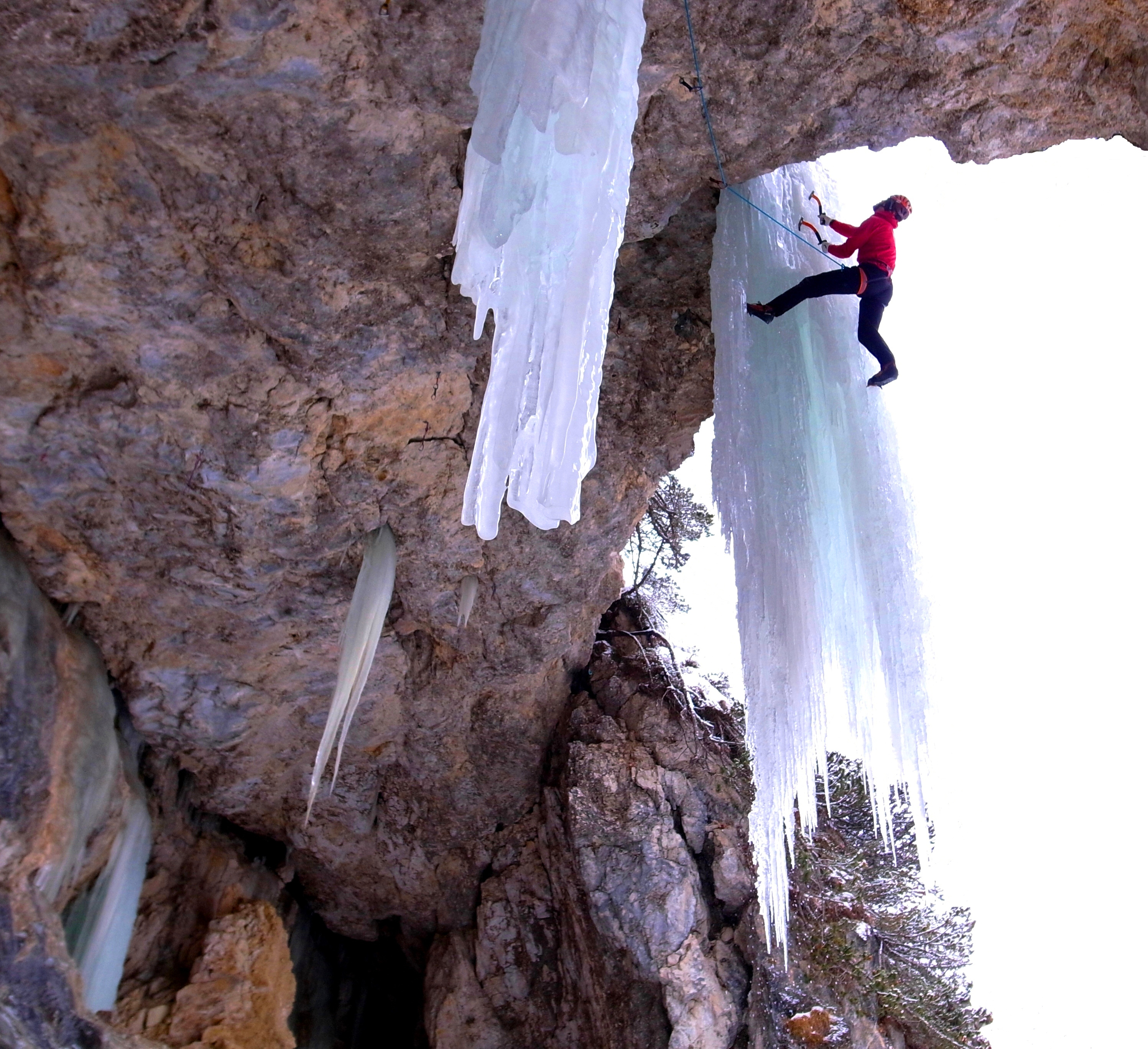
Szilas on mixed climbing route Silent Memories (M9), Italy.

Szilas has been on about a dozen climbing expeditions around the world, which have resulted in several first ascents of previously unclimbed mountains. A few of these expeditions were carried out together with the American mountaineer Jess Roskelley according to Szilas' personal website. Their most notable achievement was the first ascent of a route that they named the 'Hypa Zypa Couloir' on the Citadel in the Kichatna Range, Alaska. In 2009 Szilas made the first ascent of the mountain Ren Zhong Feng in the Sichuan Province of China, and 2012 he completed the first ascent of a mountain in Kyrgyzstan, which he named Peak Lea after his wife.

== Geology ==
Szilas was trained as a geologist from the University of Copenhagen where he obtained a Ph.D. degree in 2012. He conducts research on some of the oldest rocks on Earth, found in SW Greenland. Szilas has previously carried out postdoctoral research at Columbia University in New York and subsequently worked as a researcher at Stanford University in California. He then returned to Denmark where he first worked as a postdoc at GEUS, and is currently an assistant professor at the University of Copenhagen. According to his personal statement his research: "focuses on the geochemistry and petrology of Archaean rocks from Greenland. It aims at understanding the relations between ultramafic and mafic-andesitic rock assemblages in order to place constraints on models for the evolution of the craton."
