= Tamotsu Nakamura =

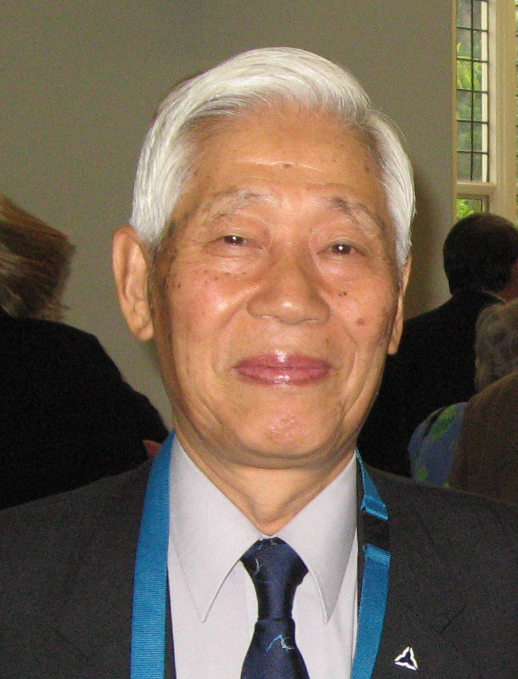
Tamotsu Nakamura in London at the award ceremony 2008 for the Busk Medal, Royal Geographical Society

Tamotsu Nakamura (also known as Tom Nakamura), FRGS, (born 1934) is a Japanese explorer, alpinist, photographer and author. Since 1990, he has explored the mountainous areas between the Himalayas and the Sichuan basin; which he documents in photographs. He is a leading authority on the Alps of Tibet, the south-eastern sector of the Tibetan high plateau.

== Early life ==
Nakamura was born in Tokyo. After studying business administration at Hitotsubashi University, he worked for Ishikawajima-Harima Heavy Industries Co., Ltd, ultimately as managing director of IHI Hong Kong Ltd.

== Career ==
=== Alpinist ===
His mountaineering career started in 1953 as a member of the Hitotsubashi University Mountaineering Club, which climbed in Japanese mountain areas. He made the second ascent of Pucajirca Norte (6046 m, Cordillera Blanca/Peru) in 1961, followed by three first ascents and various second ascents in Cordillera Apolobamba and Pupuya in Bolivia.

=== "Alps of Tibet" ===
Since 1990, Nakamura has conducted more than 40 journeys exploring mountain areas of the south-eastern part of the Tibetan high plateau (status as of 2020) that he termed the Alps of Tibet. The "Alps" cover the Nyainqêntanglha Mountains, Kangri Garpo range and the Hengduan Mountains including the Deep Gorge Country structured by three parallel rivers, the Salween, Mekong and Yangtze. Nakamura identified and photographed hundreds of peaks for the first time, capturing photos of more than 200 unclimbed, over-6000m peaks still unclimbed. Nakamura is regarded worldwide as an authority on the area. He has published numerous articles in mountaineering journals such as Alpine Journal, American Alpine Journal, Himalayan Journal, Climbing, Altitudes, Vertical and Japanese Alpine News.

He has been recognized by the Royal Geographical Society with the Busk Medal in 2008 and the International Climbing and Mountaineering Federation – UIAA for his field exploration in Eastern Tibet. The Alpinist named him Steward of Unclimbed Peaks.

Nakamura is editor of Japanese Alpine News. He is author of several books about the Alps of Tibet that have been published in Japanese, English and German.

== Personal life ==
Nakamura is married and has two children. After stays in Pakistan (1967–1971), Mexico (1975–1982), New-Zealand (1984–1989) and Hong Kong (1989–1994), he returned to Tokyo.

== Recognition ==
- 2003 Prince Chichibu Memorial Mountaineering Award 2003 of Japanese Alpine Club for field exploration in Eastern Tibet
- 2007 UIAA Award for contributions to international mountaineering
- 2008 Busk Medal, Royal Geographical Society, London, for field exploration in the mountain ranges of west China and Tibet
- 2010 International Explorers Award in Poland
- 2016 Piolets d’Or Asia Lifetime Achievement Award
- Honorary Memberships in Himalayan Club (India), American Alpine Club (USA), Alpine Club (UK), Japanese Alpine Club (Japan), Polish Mountaineering Association], New Zealand Alpine Club, Sikkim Mountaineering Association, UIAA honorary member
- Nakamura is Fellow of the Royal Geographical Society

== Bibliography ==
- East of the Himalaya (in Japanese). Yamakei Publishers, Tokyo 1996, ISBN 4-635-28037-3
- Deep Gorge Country (in Japanese). Yamakei Publishers, Tokyo 2000, ISBN 4-635-28038-1
- The Alps of Tibet (in Japanese). Yamakei Publishers, Tokyo 2004, ISBN 4-635-28062-4
- East of the Himalayas - To the Alps of Tibet. Japanese Alpine News, Vol. 4 Mai 2003 Special Submission
- Die Alpen Tibets (in German). Detjen-Verlag. Hamburg 2008, ISBN 978-3-937597-25-6
- East of the Himalaya - Mountain Peak Maps. Nakanishiya Shuppan Co., Ltd., Kyoto 2016, ISBN 978-4-7795-0994-0
- Flying over the Himalaya - Peak Identifikation. Nakanishiya Shuppan Co., Ltd., Kyoto 2019, ISBN 978-4-7795-1360-2
- Unclimbed Summits and Three Parallel Rivers - East of the Himalaya, Blank on Maps. Nakanishiya Shuppan Co., Ltd., Kyoto 2021. ISBN 978-4-7795-1541-5
