= Yuqu River =

River in Tibet, China

Coordinates: 28°35′51″N 98°21′58″E

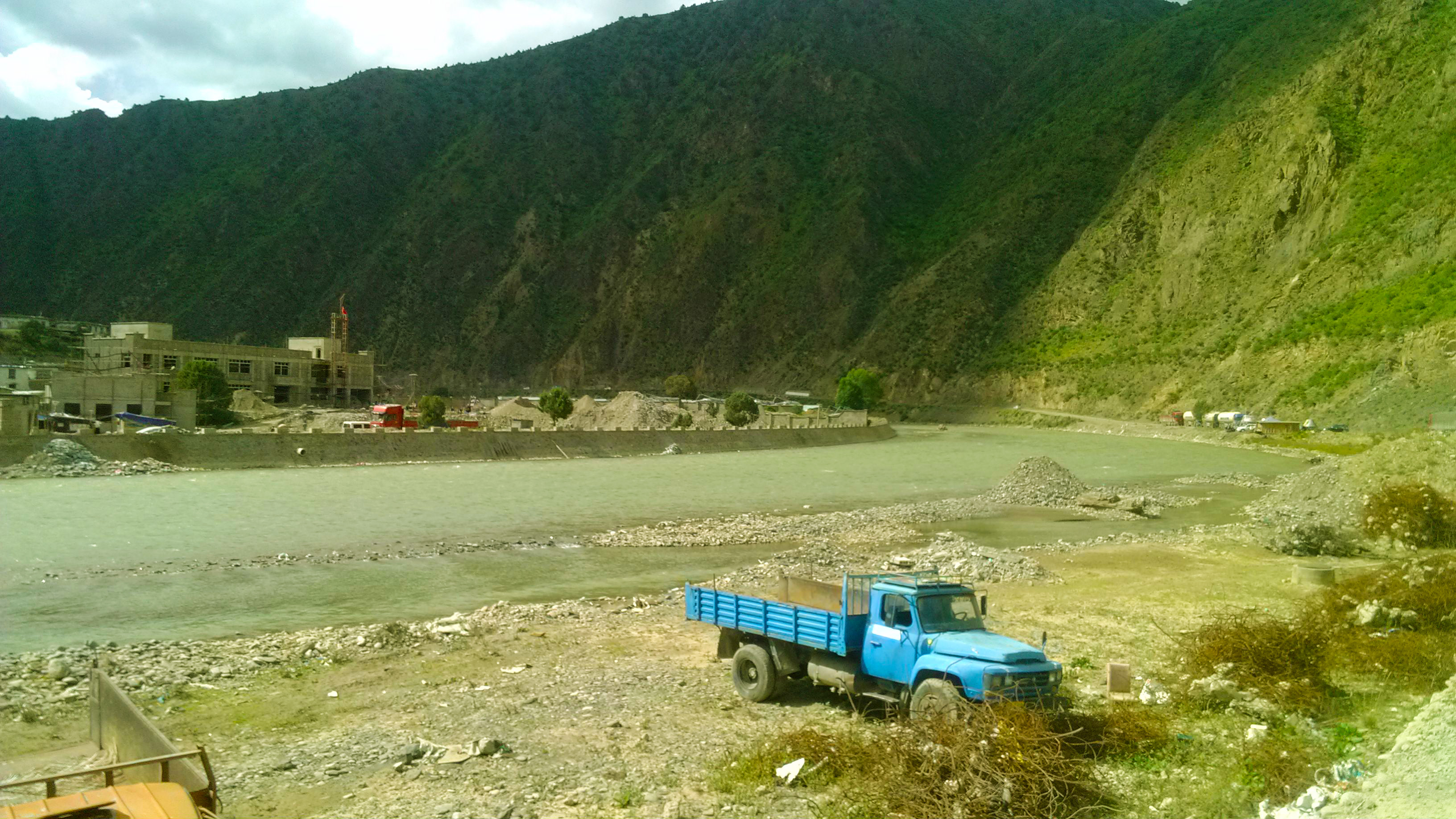
Yuqu River in Zogang County.

The Yuqu River (Tibetan: གཡུ་ཆུ།, Wylie: gyu chu, Chinese: 玉曲; pinyin: Yù Qǔ) is a left-bank tributary of the Nujiang River in eastern Tibet Autonomous Region of China. It starts in the Wahe mountain of northeast Lhorong County, runs 402 kilometres through Baxoi County and Zogang County, and empties into the Nujiang River near Muba Village of Zayü County.
