= Liyuan Dam =

- Location within China
- Location: Border of Yulong County and Shangri-La County, Yunnan Province
- Coordinates: 27°40′35″N 100°17′31″E
- Construction began: 2008
- Opening date: 2014
- Construction cost: 16.2 billion RMB ($2.4 billion USD)

Dam and spillways
- Impounds: Jinsha River
- Height: 155 m (509 ft)

Reservoir
- Creates: Liyuan Reservoir
- Total capacity: 727,000,000 m^{3} (589,388 acre⋅ft)
- Catchment area: 220,000 km^{2} (84,942 sq mi)
- Surface area: 14.73 km^{2} (6 sq mi)

Power Station
- Commission date: 2014-2015
- Type: Conventional
- Turbines: 4 x 600 MW
- Installed capacity: 2,400 MW

The Liyuan Dam is a concrete-face rock-fill dam on the Jinsha River on the border of Yulong County and Shangri-La County, Yunnan Province, China. The dam has an associated hydroelectric power station with a 2,400 MW power station containing 4 x 600 MW generators. Construction on the river diversion for the dam began in 2008. It began to impound its reservoir in November 2014 and on December 28, 2014 the first generator was commissioned. The second generator was commissioned in July 2015.

The 155 m (509 ft) dam withholds a reservoir of 727,000,000 m^{3} (589,388 acre⋅ft), of which 209,000,000 m^{3} (169,439 acre⋅ft) is active or "useful" storage. The normal reservoir level is 1,618 m (5,308 ft) above sea level with a minimum of 1,602 m (5,256 ft). The catchment area for the reservoir in the upstream basin is 220,000 km^{2} (84,942 sq mi) while the reservoir surface area is 14.73 km^{2} (6 sq mi).

== See also ==
- List of power stations in China
