= Lawa Hydropower Station =

Hydropower station in China

Lawa Hydropower Station 拉哇水电站
- Country: China
- Location: in the upper reaches of the Jinsha River
- Purpose: Power, flood control
- Construction began: March 2017
- Construction cost: ¥30.969 billion

The Lawa Hydropower Station (Chinese: 拉哇水电站) is a hydropower station along the Jinsha River in the junction of Sichuan Province and Tibet Autonomous Region. It is located in the upper reaches of the Jinsha River. The Lawa Dam is a rock-fill dam with a maximum height of 234 meters. The total investment of this project is ¥ 30.969 billion, and the total installed capacity is 2 million kilowatts.

== History ==
In March 2017, the preparatory construction of Lawa Hydropower Station started. In January 2019, the National Development and Reform Commission approved the construction of the Lawa Hydropower Station.

Lawa Hydropower Station is a major project that is prioritized in the "12th Five-Year Plan" and "13th Five-Year Plan".
