= Yebatan Hydropower Station =

Hydropower station in China

Yebatan Hydropower Station 叶巴滩水电站
- Interactive map of Yebatan Hydropower Station 叶巴滩水电站
- Country: China
- Location: at the junction of Baiyu and Konjo
- Coordinates: 30°45′N 98°58′E
- Purpose: Power, flood control, navigation
- Construction began: March 2017
- Opening date: June 27, 2017
- Construction cost: ¥33.36 billion

The Yebatan Hydropower Station (Chinese: 叶巴滩水电站) is the hydropower project with the largest installed capacity in the upper reaches of the Jinsha River. It is located at the junction of Baiyu County in Sichuan Province and Konjo County in Tibet Autonomous Region.

Since it is an arch dam, it is also called as the Yebatan Arch Dam, with a maximum height of 217 meters. The total investment in this project is ¥ 33.36 billion, and its first generating unit is expected to be operational by 2025, and the total installed capacity is 2.24 million kilowatts. It is located at 2889 meters above sea level, with cliffs rising on sides from there, potentially as high as 3,500 meters. Given risks from mud or rockslides mixed with water from that height, there is some concern about cascading disaster risk blowing out chain of mega dams below it, not unlike 2026 Nepal–Tibet floods.

== History ==
In November 2016, the National Development and Reform Commission approved the construction of the Lawa Hydropower Station. On June 27, 2017, construction of the Yebatan Hydropower Station officially began.

On March 30, 2019, the upstream cofferdam of the plant was intercepted and the main construction of the project was fully underway.
