= Jiacha Hydropower Station =

Hydropower station in Gyaca, Tibet, China

Gacha Hydropower Station 加查水电站
- Location within Tibet Location within China
- Interactive map of Gacha Hydropower Station 加查水电站
- Country: China
- Location: on the middle reaches of the Brahmaputura downstream of Zangmu
- Coordinates: 29.1403°N 92.5464°E
- Purpose: Power, irrigation
- Construction began: December 2015
- Opening date: August 2020
- Construction cost: ¥7.83 billion

The Jiacha Hydropower Station (Chinese: 加查水电站), also named Gacha Hydropower Station, is the second largest hydropower station built in Tibet, located in Gyaca County on the middle reaches of the Yarlung Tsangpo, with a total installed capacity of 360 MW and a designed annual generation capacity of 1.705 billion kWh.

== History ==
Jiacha Hydropower Station was approved by the National Development and Reform Commission in 2015, and its official construction started in December. On 11 August 2020, its first unit was put into operation for electricity generation.

The hydroelectric power plant is currently the largest power station in Tibet in terms of single-unit capacity, which is 120,000 kilowatts.

The project is one of the three hydro dams on the Yarlung Tsangpo, which State Council of China announced in January 2013 as part of its New Energy Development Plan.

== See also ==
- List of dams on the Brahmaputra River
