= Renzonghai Dam =

- Location within China
- Country: China
- Location: Kangding, Garzê, Sichuan Province
- Coordinates: 29°22′34.96″N 101°54′43.66″E
- Purpose: Power
- Status: Operational
- Construction began: 2004
- Opening date: 2007; 19 years ago

Dam and spillways
- Type of dam: Embankment, rock-fill
- Impounds: Tianwanhe River
- Height: 60 m (200 ft)

Reservoir
- Total capacity: 112,000,000 m^{3} (91,000 acre⋅ft)

Renzonghai, Jinwo and Dafa Hydropower Stations
- Commission date: Renzonghai: 2009; Jinwo: 2007; Dafa: 2008
- Type: Conventional, diversion
- Hydraulic head: Renzonghai: 560 m (1,840 ft); Jinwo: 595 m (1,952 ft); Dafa: 482 m (1,581 ft)
- Turbines: Renzonghai: 2 x 123 MW Pelton-type; Jinwo: 2 x 143.6 MW Pelton-type; Dafa: 2 x 123 MW Pelton-type
- Installed capacity: 779.2 MW

The Renzonghai Dam is a rock-fill embankment dam on the Tianwanhe River, a tributary of the Dadu River, in Kangding of Sichuan Province, China. The primary purpose of the dam is hydroelectric power generation and it supports three power stations downstream, the Renzonghai, Jinwo and Dafa Hydropower Stations. Water from the dam is sent via penstock first to the 246 MW Renzonghai (29°23′52.38″N 101°58′34.41″E) then the 287.2 MW Jinwo (29°23′13.74″N 102°3′44.43″E) and finally, the 246 MW Dafa Hydropower Station (29°23′31.79″N 102°5′15.36″E). The total installed capacity of the power stations is 779.2 MW Construction on the project began in August 2004 and the Jinwo power station was commissioned in 2007, the Dafa in 2008 and the Renzonghai in 2009. The Jinwo station contains the largest Pelton turbines in Asia, two at 146.3 MW each.

== See also ==
- List of dams and reservoirs in China
- List of tallest dams in China
