= Jinsha River =

Chinese river, part of the Yangtze

Jinsha Yangtze (长江)
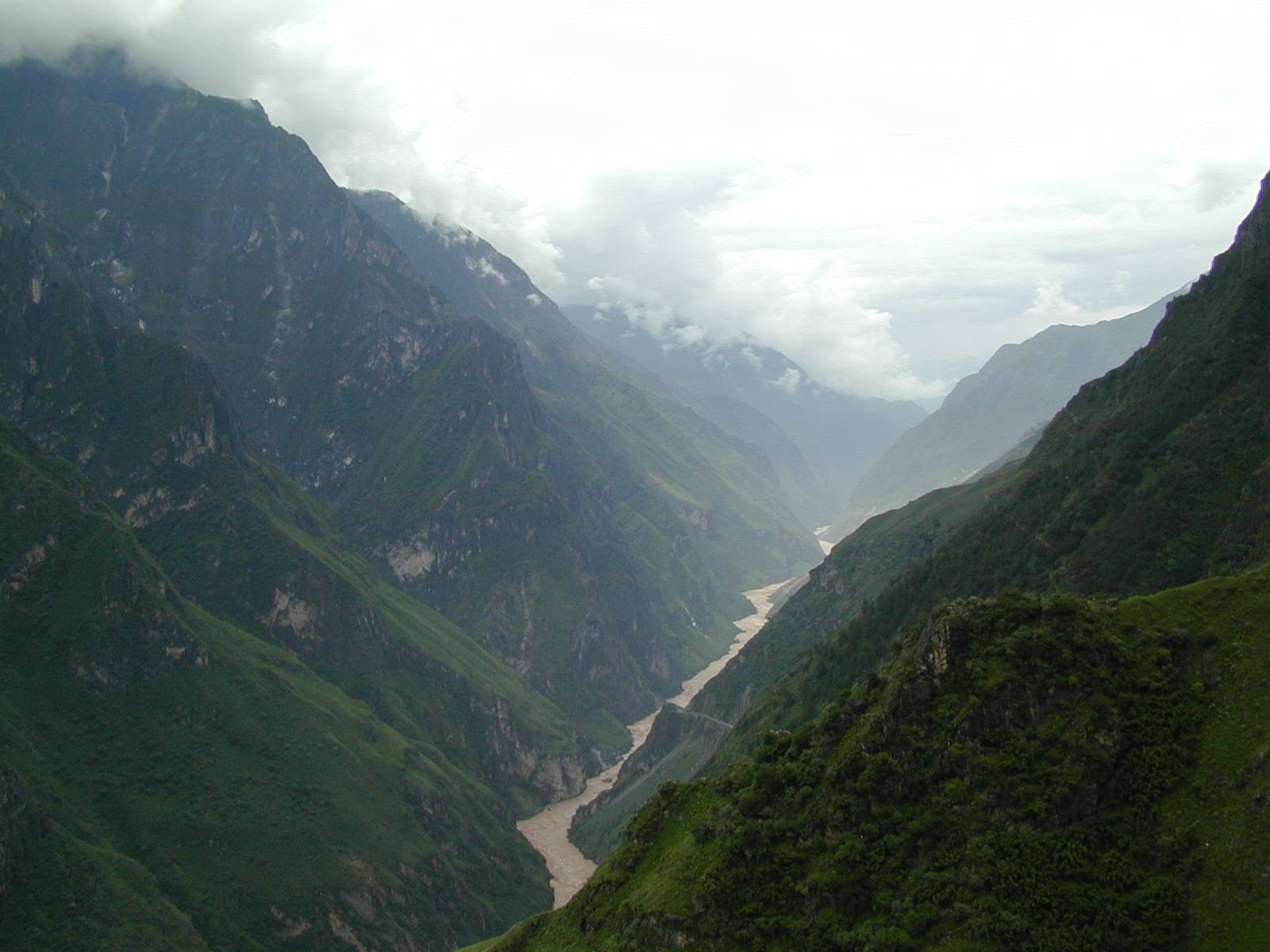
- Jinsha flowing along the bottom of Tiger Leaping Gorge

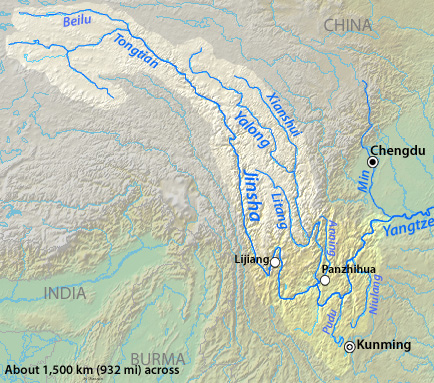
- Map of the Jinsha River drainage basin
- Etymology: Chinese: "Gold Dust River"
- Native name: 金沙江

Location
- Country: China
- State: Qinghai, Tibet Autonomous Region, Yunnan, Sichuan
- Cities: Lijiang, Yunnan, Panzhihua

Physical characteristics
- Source: Tongtian River
  - location: Confluence of the Tongtian and Batang Rivers, Qinghai
  - coordinates: 34°5′38.8″N 92°54′46.1″E
  - elevation: 4,500 m (14,800 ft)
- Mouth: Yangtze River
  - location: Confluence with Min Jiang at Yibin, Sichuan
  - coordinates: 28°46′13.4″N 104°37′58.1″E
  - elevation: 300 m (980 ft)
- Length: 2,290 km (1,420 mi)approx.; 3,454 km (2,146 mi) total length including Tongtian - Dam Qu River
- Basin size: 485,000 km^{2} (187,000 sq mi)approx.
- Discharge
  - average: 4,471 m^{3}/s (157,900 cu ft/s)
  - maximum: 35,000 m^{3}/s (1,200,000 cu ft/s)

Basin features
- Progression: Yangtze → East China Sea
- River system: Yangtze River basin
- Tributaries
  - left: Beilu River, Yalong River
  - right: Pudu River, Dadan River, Xiaojiang River, Niulan River

The Jinsha River (Chinese: 金沙江; pinyin: Jīnshājiāng; lit. 'Gold Sand River', Tibetan: Dri Chu, འབྲི་ཆུ, Yi: ꀉꉷꏁꒉ, romanized: Axhuo Shyxyy) is the Chinese name for the upper stretches of the Yangtze River. It flows through the provinces of Qinghai, Sichuan, and Yunnan in western China. The river passes through Tiger Leaping Gorge.

It is sometimes grouped together with the Lancang (upper Mekong) and Nu (upper Salween) as the Sanjiang ("Three Rivers") area, part of which makes up the Three Parallel Rivers of Yunnan Protected Areas.

The river is important in generating hydroelectric power, and several of the world's largest hydroelectric power stations are on the Jinsha river.

== Name ==
The river was first recorded as the Hei (黑水, Hēishuǐ, lit. "Blackwater") in the Warring States' "Tribute of Yu". It was described as the Sheng (t 繩水, s 绳水, Shéngshuǐ, "Rope River") in the Han-era Classic of Mountains and Seas. During the Three Kingdoms, it was known as the Lu (t 瀘水, s 泸水, Lúshuǐ).

Owing to earlier romanization systems, the river has been known as the Chin-sha Chiang and Kinsha Kiang (when it was not simply described as the Yangtze) in English sources for the last three centuries. The most common present name, Jinsha is the Hanyu Pinyin romanization of the same Chinese characters as the other two.

Although the name is generally over-literally translated as the "Gold Sand" or "Golden-Sanded River", the name is not poetic or descriptive of the color of the river's banks. Rather, 金沙 described actual placer gold, alluvial gold powder sometimes still panned from the river's waters. The name "Jinsha" originates in the Song dynasty when the river attracted large numbers of gold prospectors. Gold prospecting along the Jinsha continues to this day.

The Jinsha culture in prehistoric China derives its name from a road near its type site and not from the river directly.

== Geography ==
=== Route ===
The Jinsha River is simply the upper course of the Yangtze, although the Yalong and Min rivers were sometimes considered to have been the main course before the advent of modern geography. It is traditionally considered to begin at the confluence of the Tongtian and Batang rivers near Gyêgu in Qinghai.

As the Jinsha River, it then flows south through a deep gorge parallel to the similar gorges of the upper Mekong and upper Salween rivers, from which it is separated by the Ningjing Mountains. It forms the western border of Sichuan for some 250 miles (400 km) and then flows into Yunnan province. After a large, 200 mile (320 km) long loop to the north of Dali Bai Autonomous Prefecture, the Jinsha swings northeast, forming the Sichuan-Yunnan provincial boundary until it joins the Min River at Yibin in Sichuan to form the Yangtze.

Lashihai Wetland is in the basin of the Jinsha River. The lake and wetland supplies drinking water to Lijiang, provides flood control, storage, and water balance functions for the Jinsha and Yangtze watersheds, and is habitat to thousands of resident and migratory waterbirds.

=== Gradients ===
The upper course of the river falls about 14 feet per mile (2.7 m/km). Below Batang in Sichuan, the gradient gradually decreases to about 8 feet per mile (1.5 m/km) but the Jinsha is not navigable. Its upper course through the gorges, particularly, is more of an obstacle than an aid to transportation.

== Dams ==
The Jinsha is being heavily developed, primarily for hydroelectric power. By March 2014, a total of 25 dams were completed, under construction or planned for the river. Those dams are listed below from downstream to upstream. After completion of the Baihetan Dam in 2022, five of the largest hydroelectric power stations in the world with sizes of at least 3,000 MW, are on the river. When all the hydropower stations are in operation on the Jinsha River, they constitute the world's largest clean energy corridor. However, some of these dams (e.g. Gangtuo Dam) are being developed in Tibet and local protests have been violently suppressed by Chinese authorities, leading to concerns of human rights violations.

- Xiangjiaba Dam – completed, 6,000 MW
- Xiluodu Dam – completed, 13,860 MW
- Baihetan Dam – completed, 16,000 MW
- Wudongde Dam – completed, 10,200 MW
- Yinjiang Dam – completed, 345 MW
- Jinsha Dam – completed, 560 MW
- Guanyinyan Dam – completed, 3,000 MW
- Ludila Dam – completed, 2,160 MW
- Longkaikou Dam – completed, 1,800 MW
- Jinanqiao Dam – completed, 2,400 MW
- Ahai Dam – completed, 2,000 MW
- Liyuan Dam – completed, 2,400 MW
- Liangjiaren Dam – controversial, 3,000 MW
- Longpan Dam – controversial, 4,200 MW
- Bengzilan Dam – planned, 2,100 MW
- Rimian Dam – programmed, 3,720 MW
- Changbo Dam – completed, 1,200 MW
- Suwalong Dam – completed, 1,160 MW
- Batang Dam – programmed, 740 MW
- Lawa Dam – programmed, 2,240 MW
- Yebatan Dam – programmed, 2,080 MW
- Boluo Dam – planned, 960 MW
- Yanbi Dam – planned, 300 MW
- Gangtuo Dam – planned, 1,100 MW
- Guotong Dam – planned, 140 MW

== History ==
=== Imperial China ===
The pre-imperial "Tribute of Yu" recorded the traditional view of the Yangtze River as originating with the Min or Yalong instead of the Jinsha and this remained unchallenged for millennia, even after Li Daoyuan's Commentary on the Water Classic recorded much of the Jinsha's extensive river system during the Northern Wei. The Ming-era geographer Xu Xiake was the first to correct this, although it remained a common misconception in China as late as the early 20th century.

=== People's Republic ===
The Jinsha River is under heavy development by China, with over sixteen dam projects in various phases of development along the river, and many on its tributaries as well, especially the Yalong. Four dams along the lower part of the river are under construction or have already been completed to generate hydroelectric power and to trap silt that would otherwise create problems at the Three Gorges Dam. The ten largest dams will produce 55,710 megawatts of power.

== See also ==
- List of rivers in China
- Category: Tributaries of the Yangtze River
- Category:Dams on the Jinsha River
- Tiger Leaping Gorge
- Three Parallel Rivers of Yunnan Protected Areas
