= Jia Prefecture (Sichuan) =

Historical administrative division in Sichuan, China

- Simplified Chinese: 嘉州
- Hanyu Pinyin: Jiā Zhōu
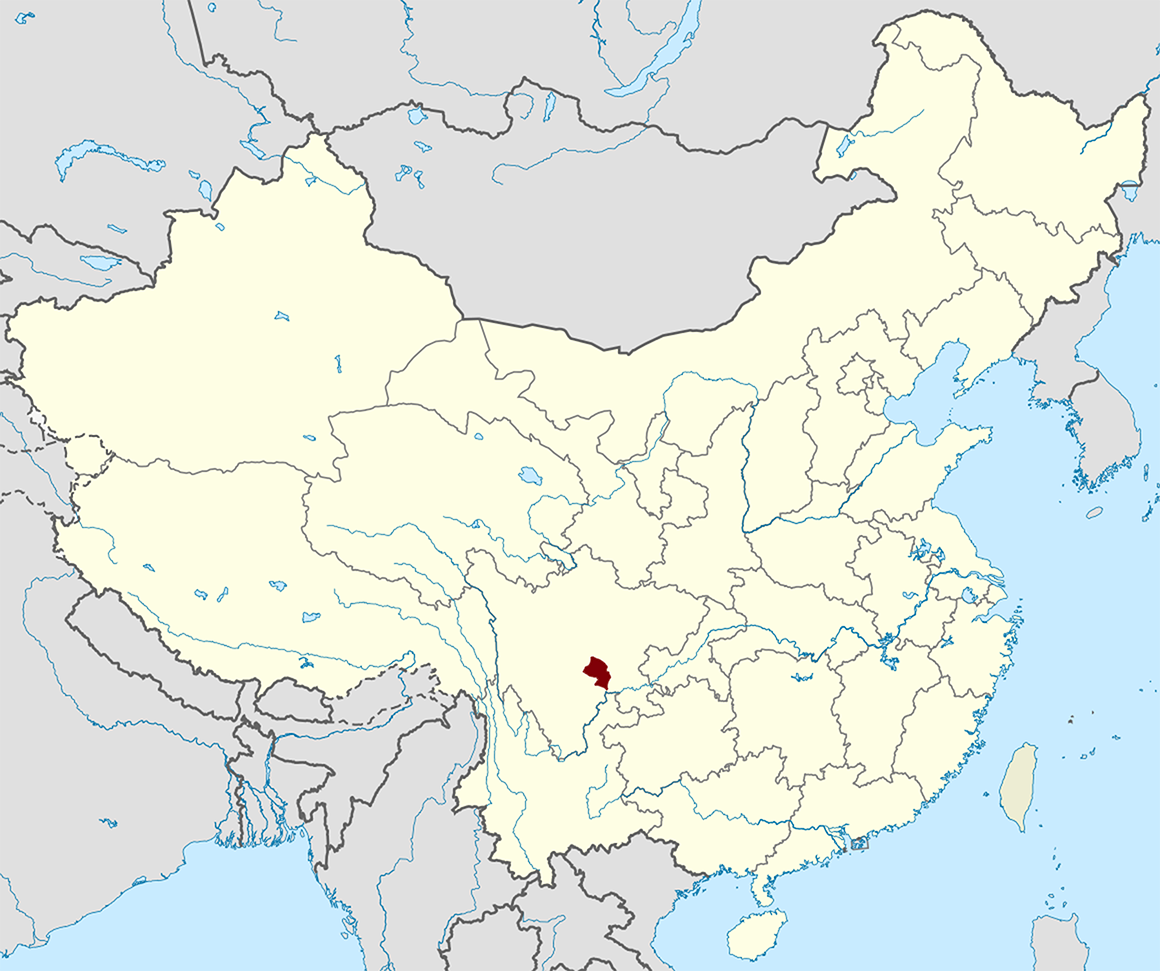
- Population
  - 740s or 750s: 99,591
  - 1100s: 210,472
- History
  - Created: 579 (Northern Zhou); 618 (Tang dynasty); 758 (Tang dynasty)
  - Abolished: 1196 (Song dynasty)
  - Succeeded by: Jiading Prefecture
- Contained within
  - Circuit: Jiannan Circuit; Chengdufu Circuit; Yizhou Circuit

Jiazhou or Jia Prefecture was a zhou (prefecture) in imperial China seated in modern Leshan, Sichuan, China. It existed (intermittently) from the 6th century to 1196. Between 742 and 758 (during the Tang dynasty) it was known as Qianwei Commandery (犍為郡).

== Geography ==
The administrative region of Jiazhou in the Tang dynasty is under the administration of modern Leshan in southeastern Sichuan:

- Leshan
- Emeishan City
- Jiajiang County
- Qianwei County
- Muchuan County
- Mabian Yi Autonomous County
- Ebian Yi Autonomous County
