= Aojiazhen =

Aojiazhen 敖家镇
- Township
- Location in Sichuan
- Coordinates: 29°25′43″N 103°57′26″E
- Country: People's Republic of China
- Province: Sichuan
- Prefecture-level city: Leshan
- County: Qianwei County
- Time zone: UTC+8 (China Standard)

Aojia Town (Chinese: 敖家镇) is a village and town in Qianwei County, Leshan City, Sichuan, China. It has an area of 48.1 square kilometers.

== Villages ==
The jurisdiction of Aojia Town includes 14 villages:

- Caihua
- Cotton
- Guangguang
- Guiping
- Healthy
- Linfeng
- Longfeng
- Qingshan
- Shiba
- Shuijing
- Weigan
- Weixing
- Xianfeng
- Xianjin

== See also ==
- List of township-level divisions of Sichuan
