= Cizhu Township, Sichuan =

Cizhu Township 茨竹乡
- Township
- Cizhuxiang
- Location in Sichuan
- Coordinates: 29°9′21″N 103°38′35″E
- Country: People's Republic of China
- Province: Sichuan
- Autonomous prefecture: Leshan
- County: Muchuan

Area
  - Total: 82.4 km^{2} (31.8 sq mi)

Population (2010)
  - Total: 7,257
  - Density: 88.1/km^{2} (228/sq mi)
- Time zone: UTC+8 (China Standard)

Cizhu (Chinese: 茨竹乡) is a township in Muchuan County, Leshan, Sichuan, China. In 2010, Cizhu Township had a total population of 7,257: 3,835 males and 3,422 females: 1,322 aged under 14, 4,817 aged between 15 and 65 and 1,108 aged over 65.

== See also ==
- List of township-level divisions of Sichuan
