= Zhenxi, Sichuan =

Zhenxi 轸溪镇
- Town
- Zhenxizhen
- Location in Sichuan
- Coordinates: 29°19′21″N 103°34′12″E
- Country: People's Republic of China
- Province: Sichuan
- Prefecture-level city: Leshan
- District: Shawan District

Area
  - Total: 28.14 km^{2} (10.86 sq mi)

Population (2010)
  - Total: 4,608
  - Density: 163.8/km^{2} (424.1/sq mi)
- Time zone: UTC+8 (China Standard)

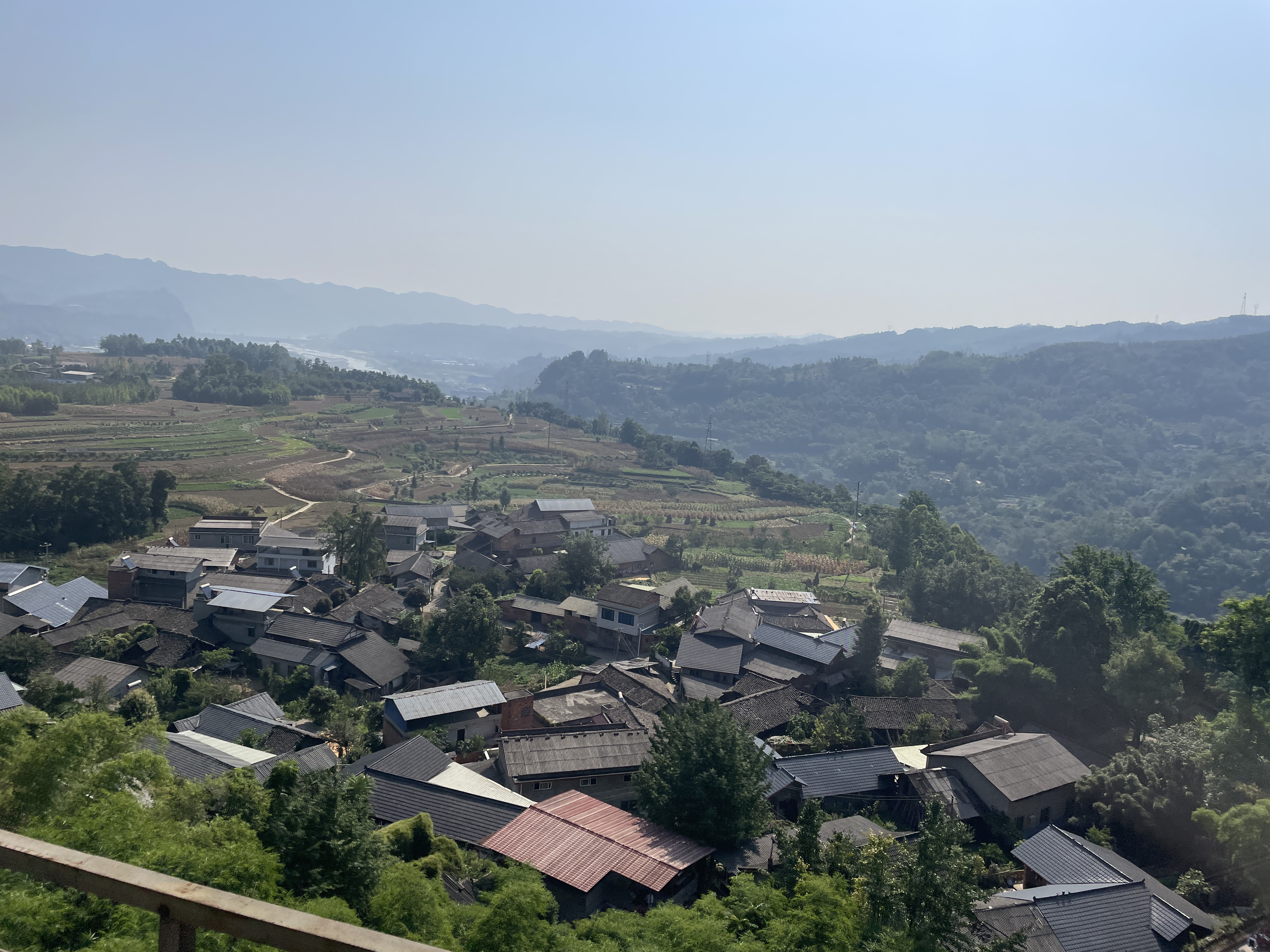
View of Heping Village in Zhenxi

Zhenxi (Chinese: 轸溪镇) is a town in Shawan District, Leshan, Sichuan, China.

== Demographics ==
In 2010, Zhenxi had a total population of 4,608: 2,308 males and 2,228 females: 704 aged under 14, 3,155 aged between 15 and 65 and 749 aged over 65.

== See also ==
- List of township-level divisions of Sichuan
