= Qiong Prefecture (Sichuan) =

Historical administrative division in Sichuan, China

Qiong Prefecture (邛州) Linqiong Commandery (臨邛郡)
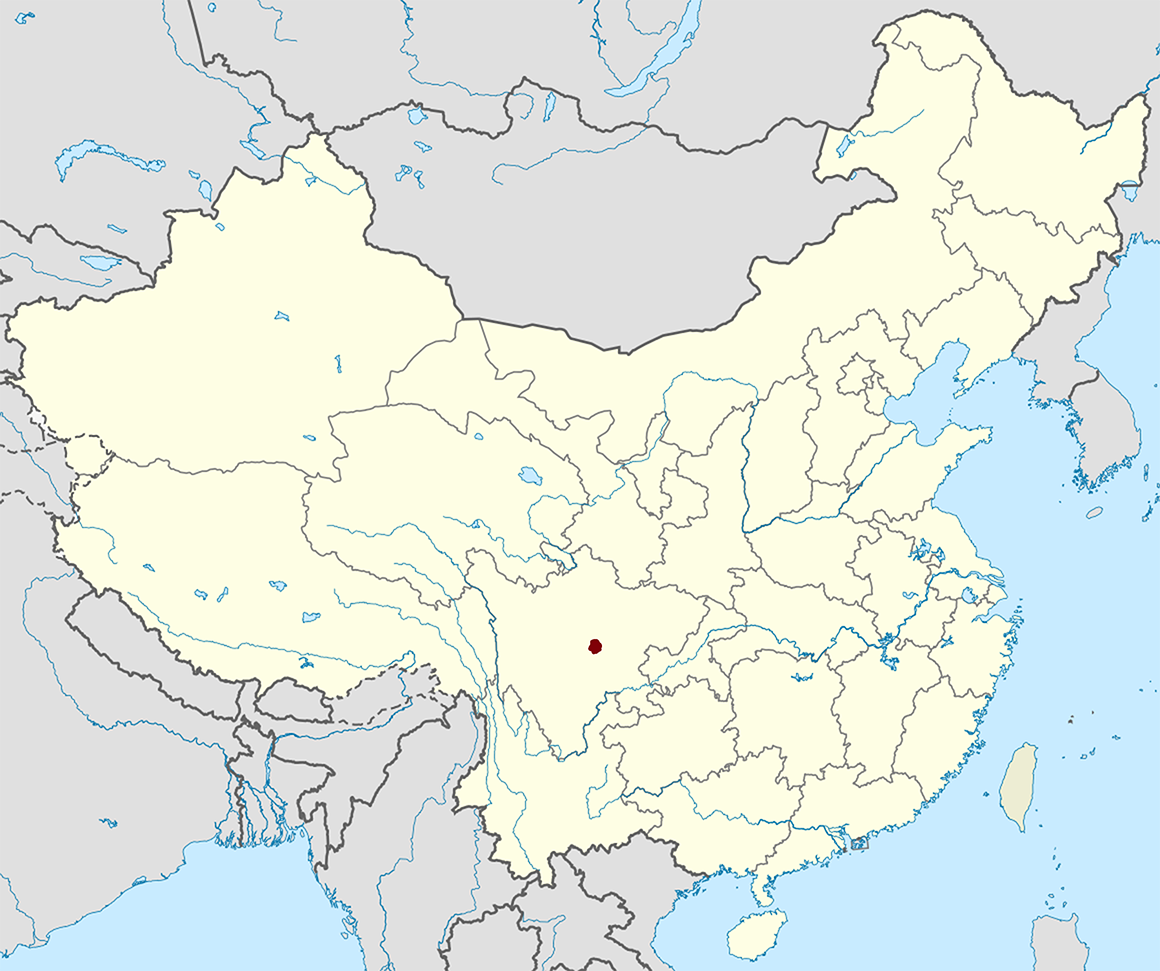
- Population
  - 740s or 750s: 190,327
  - 1100s: 193,032
- History
  - Created: 6th century (Liang dynasty)
  - Abolished: 1913 (Republic of China)
  - Succeeded by: Qionglai County (邛崍縣)
- Contained within
  - Circuit: Tang dynasty: Jiannan Circuit; Song dynasty: Xichuan Circuit; Yizhou Circuit; Chengdufu Circuit

Qiong Prefecture
- Chinese: 邛州
Transcriptions
Standard Mandarin
- Hanyu Pinyin: Qióng Zhōu

Linqiong Commandery
- Traditional Chinese: 臨邛郡
- Simplified Chinese: 临邛郡
Transcriptions
Standard Mandarin
- Hanyu Pinyin: Línqióng Jùn

Qiongzhou or Qiong Prefecture was a zhou (prefecture) in imperial China seated in modern Qionglai City in Chengdu, Sichuan, China. It existed (intermittently) from the 6th century to 1913. Between 742 and 758 it was known as Linqiong Commandery.

== Administrative divisions ==
Qiong Prefecture administered the following counties (縣) through the history:

#	Name	Modern location
1	Linqiong (臨邛)	Qionglai City
2	Yizheng (依政)	Qionglai City
3	Huojing (火井)	Qionglai City
4	Dayi (大邑)	Dayi County
5	Anreng (安仁)	Dayi County
6	Pujiang (蒲江)	Pujiang County
7	Linxi (臨溪)	Pujiang County
