= Li Jia =

Li Jia may refer to:

== Entertainers ==
- Liyuu (cosplayer and singer, born 1997), born Li Jia, female Chinese tarento, voice actress and singer

== Politicians ==
- Li Jia (politician, born 1961), male Chinese politician, Deputy Communist Party Secretary of Inner Mongolia
- Li Jia (politician, born 1964), male Chinese politician, former Communist Party Secretary of Zhuhai
- Li Jia (politician, born 1966), female Chinese politician, former Party Secretary of Ziyang, Sichuan

== Other ==
- Li Jia (table tennis), (born 1981) female table tennis player, peak of career from 2000 to 2003
- Li Kezhu (李柯竺), born Li Jia, Chinese actress who appeared in The Park (2007 film)
