= Killing of Zheng Shaoxiong =

Shooting of a Chinese student in Chicago, Illinois

Murder of Zheng Shaoxiong
- Location: Chicago, Illinois, U.S.
- Date: November 6, 2021
- Attack type: Murder by shooting
- Victims: Zheng Shaoxiong, aged 24
- Perpetrator: Alton Spann
- Motive: Robbery

On November 9, 2021, 24-year-old Zheng Shaoxiong, a graduate of the University of Chicago, was fatally shot by 19-year-old Alton Spann on the sidewalk in the 900 block of East 54th Street in Hyde Park. Court documents say that when Spann saw Zheng, who was holding a large laptop, he and two others were driving a stolen car, and Spann used a gun to rob Zheng. The suspect shot the victim one time in the chest when the victim was struggling with the suspect and trying to escape. Zheng was pronounced dead after being taken to the University of Chicago Medical Center. On November 12, Spann was charged with first-degree murder, unlawful use of a weapon, and armed robbery.

Zheng was the second international student from China to be killed in Chicago in 2021. (Note: The first was Yiran Fan, who was one of five people killed during a mass shooting in January.)

== Victim ==
Zheng Shaoxiong "Dennis"
- 郑少雄
- Born: Zheng Shaoxiong; 1997; Leshan, Sichuan, China
- Died: November 9, 2021 (aged 24); Hyde Park, Chicago, Illinois, U.S.
- Education: University of Hong Kong (BS); University of Chicago (SM)
- Parents: Zheng Xiaodong (郑晓东; father); Li Rong (李蓉; mother)

Zheng Shaoxiong
- Traditional Chinese: 鄭少雄
- Simplified Chinese: 郑少雄
Transcriptions
Standard Mandarin
- Hanyu Pinyin: Zhèng Shǎoxióng
Yue: Cantonese
- Yale Romanization: Jehng Síuhùhng
- Jyutping: Zeng6 siu2 hung4

Zheng Shaoxiong "Dennis" (Chinese: 郑少雄; pinyin: Zhèng Shǎoxióng; 1997 – November 9, 2021) was born in the city of Leshan, Sichuan, China. He was raised by his mother, who had divorced his father in the same year he was born. In 2015, he graduated from Sichuan Chengdu No.7 High School.

Zheng pursued undergraduate studies at the Department of Statistics and Actuarial Science at the University of Hong Kong. He has served as a student ambassador for the Admissions Office of the Registry at the University of Hong Kong. In his final year at college, he worked as a teaching assistant in his department. He also co-authored a self-improvement book. He graduated with a Bachelor of Science degree with first-class honors in 2019 and was selected for the dean's honours list for three consecutive years.

Zheng entered the University of Chicago for graduate studies in 2019 and graduated from the university in summer 2021 with a Master of Science degree in statistics. Due to the health issues faced by his mother, Zheng gave up his wish to pursue doctoral studies. Zheng planned to pursue a career in data science in the United States.

== Judicial proceedings ==
On the afternoon of November 12, 2021, David Brown, then superintendent of the Chicago Police Department, announced that the suspect Alton Spann has been charged with first-degree murder, armed robbery and two counts of unlawful use of a weapon, and the court barred him from bail. On December 28, Spann appeared in court again and his original six indictments were increased to 23.

If convicted, Spann could be sentenced to a minimum of 20 years in prison and a maximum of life in prison. In January 2022, Spann's trial was held in online again at the Cook County Court and he was charged with six crimes including murder, intentional wounding to death, and robbery. Spann refused to plead guilty in court and the trial was postponed till March 2.

== Reactions ==
=== Family ===
On November 17, 2021, Zheng's parents arrived in Chicago from Shanghai, in order to deal with Zheng's funeral and to repatriate his body back to China. On November 18, Zheng's mother Li Rong (李蓉) spoke at a memorial service honoring her son at the Rockefeller Memorial Chapel. Li later issued a letter of gratitude in which she described her state and psychological process after her son's death, and thanked the students and authorities for helping her.

=== University of Chicago ===
On November 10, 2021, Paul Alivisatos, president of the University of Chicago, issued a campus email with his record video message. Alivisatos expressed "deepest sympathies are with his family and loved ones" of Zheng over the murder and vows that the university community would come together to remember him. He also called the city of Chicago's violence on the same scale of the public health crisis, requiring urgent collaboration with city leaders, pledging the university's commitment to strengthening public safety efforts, and encouraging students and employees to seek counseling and support.

On November 11, 2021, the university administration officers at the University of Chicago hosted safety webinar regarding the murder of Zheng and "extended their sympathies to the family of Shaoxiong Zheng".

On November 16, 2021, the University of Chicago published an obituary for Zheng on the UChicago News website.

At 3 p.m. November 18, the University of Chicago held a memorial service for Zheng at Rockefeller Memorial Chapel. More than one thousand people attended the memorial service, including University of Chicago President Paul Alivisatos, Provost Ka Yee Christina Lee (利嘉仪), Zheng Shaoxiong's mother Li Rong (李蓉), father Zheng Xiaodong (郑晓东), Deputy Consul General of China to Chicago Bian Zhichun (边志春), representatives of the Greater Chicago Chinese Association, and Zheng Shaoxiong's teachers, classmates, and friends.

=== Community and society ===
On November 16, 2021, Chinese students in Chicago held a rally in memory of Zheng and protested against gun violence. They shouted, "We are here to learn, not to die!" More than 300 students, faculty, and community members participated in the rally.

In order to provide aid to his family, a donation drive was started in accordance to the request from Zheng's mother and was approved by the University of Chicago Chinese Students and Scholars Association. Donations began to be collected on November 15, 2021, and more than 5,200 people participated in the fundraising with an amount of US$30,000 collected in few days, far exceeding the initial target of US$25,000.

=== Chinese government ===
On November 11, 2021, the Consulate General of the People's Republic of China in Chicago issued an initial public statement. The Consulate General was deeply shocked and saddened by the unfortunate death of the Chinese student, and expresses deep condolences and sympathy to the victim's family. The Consulate General strongly condemned the brutal crime of killing innocent people, and demanded that the relevant United States authorities investigate and disclose the case as soon as possible, and take practical measures to protect the safety of Chinese citizens, including Chinese students.

On November 18, 2021, Qin Gang, then ambassador of China to the United States, issued a public statement on the embassy's website, expressing his condolences to Zheng's parents and urged the United States to bring the murderer to justice.

On November 19, the Consulate General of the People's Republic of China in Chicago issued a second public statement, strongly urging the governments in the United States to protect the safety of Chinese citizens from hate crimes and racist bullying. On the same day, Huang Liming (黄黎明), then acting consul general of China to Chicago, gave an essay-long video speech regarding the murder of Zheng and the Chinese government's position.

On November 22, 2021, Zhao Lijian, then spokesperson of the Ministry of Foreign Affairs of China, expressed his condolences to Zheng's family during the regular press conference.

=== University of Hong Kong ===
On November 13, 2021, the Department of Development and Alumni Affairs of the University of Hong Kong posted a message on WeChat mourning Zheng. Xiang Zhang, then president of the University of Hong Kong, expressed his deep condolences on Zheng's death.

== See also ==
- List of homicides in Illinois
