= Jia Prefecture =

Jia Prefecture or Jiazhou may refer to:

- Jia Prefecture (Sichuan) (嘉州), a prefecture in imperial China in modern Leshan, Sichuan, China
- Jia Prefecture (Shaanxi) (葭州), a prefecture in imperial China in modern Yulin, Shaanxi, now Jia County
