= Li Jia (politician, born 1966) =

Chinese politician (born 1966)

- 李佳

Communist Party Secretary of Ziyang
- In office April 2009 – November 2014
- Preceded by: Zhai Zhanyi
- Succeeded by: Zhou Xi'an

Personal details
- Born: January 1966 (age 60) Renshou County, Sichuan, China
- Party: Chinese Communist Party (1985–2015; expelled)
- Education: Leshan Normal University; Southwest Jiaotong University

Li Jia (Chinese: 李佳; pinyin: Lǐ Jiā; born January 1966) is a former Chinese politician from southwest China's Sichuan province. She was investigated by the Chinese Communist Party's anti-graft agency in November 2014. At the time of her investigation, she was serving as the Communist Party Secretary of Ziyang, and First Secretary of the party organization of the Ziyang Military District.

== Life and career ==
Li was born and raised in Renshou County, Sichuan. She entered Leshan Normal University in September 1984, majoring in English language, where he graduated in July 1987. After college, she taught at Leshan Finance and Trade School, at the same time, she served as the secretary of the Youth League Committee.

Beginning in October 1992, she served in several posts in the Organization Department of Sichuan Provincial Party Committee, including director, Deputy Communist Party Secretary, and Party Secretary.

From June 2005, she served as Executive Vice Mayor of Leshan, Communist Party Secretary of State-owned Assets Supervision & Administration Commission of Leshan Municipality Committee, Leshan School of Administration, and a Standing Committee of Leshan Municipal Committee of the CPC. Then she served as Communist Party Secretary and Party Branch Secretary of the Communist Youth League of Sichuan Provincial Party Committee, and Honorary President of Sichuan Youth Federation between March 2006 to May 2007.

In May 2007 she was promoted to become the Executive Deputy Head of the Organization Department of Sichuan Provincial Party Committee, a position he held until April 2009. From September 2009 to June 2011 she studied at Southwest Jiaotong University as a part-time student.

She became the Communist Party Secretary of Ziyang and First Secretary of the Party Group of the Ziyang Military District in April 2009. She was re-elected in January 2012. Her deputy Deng Quanzhong, the Mayor of Ziyang, was investigated for corruption in September 2014.

== Downfall ==
On November 27, 2014, state media reported that Li Jia was being investigated by the Central Commission for Discipline Inspection of the Chinese Communist Party for "serious violations of laws and regulations". Then she was removed from office.

She was arrested to face criminal charges in April 2015. She was expelled from the Chinese Communist Party (CCP) on July 28.

On November 8, 2016, she was sentenced to 14 years and fined 2 million yuan for taking bribes by the Neijiang Intermediate People's Court.

Civic offices
Preceded by Luo Qiang (罗强)	Secretary of Sichuan Provincial Committee of the Communist Youth League of China; 2006–2007	Succeeded by Zhang Tong (张彤)
Party political offices
Preceded by Zhai Zhanyi (翟占一)	Communist Party Secretary of Ziyang; 2009–2014	Succeeded by Zhou Xi'an (周喜安)
