= Shizhong, Leshan =

Shizhong 市中区
- District
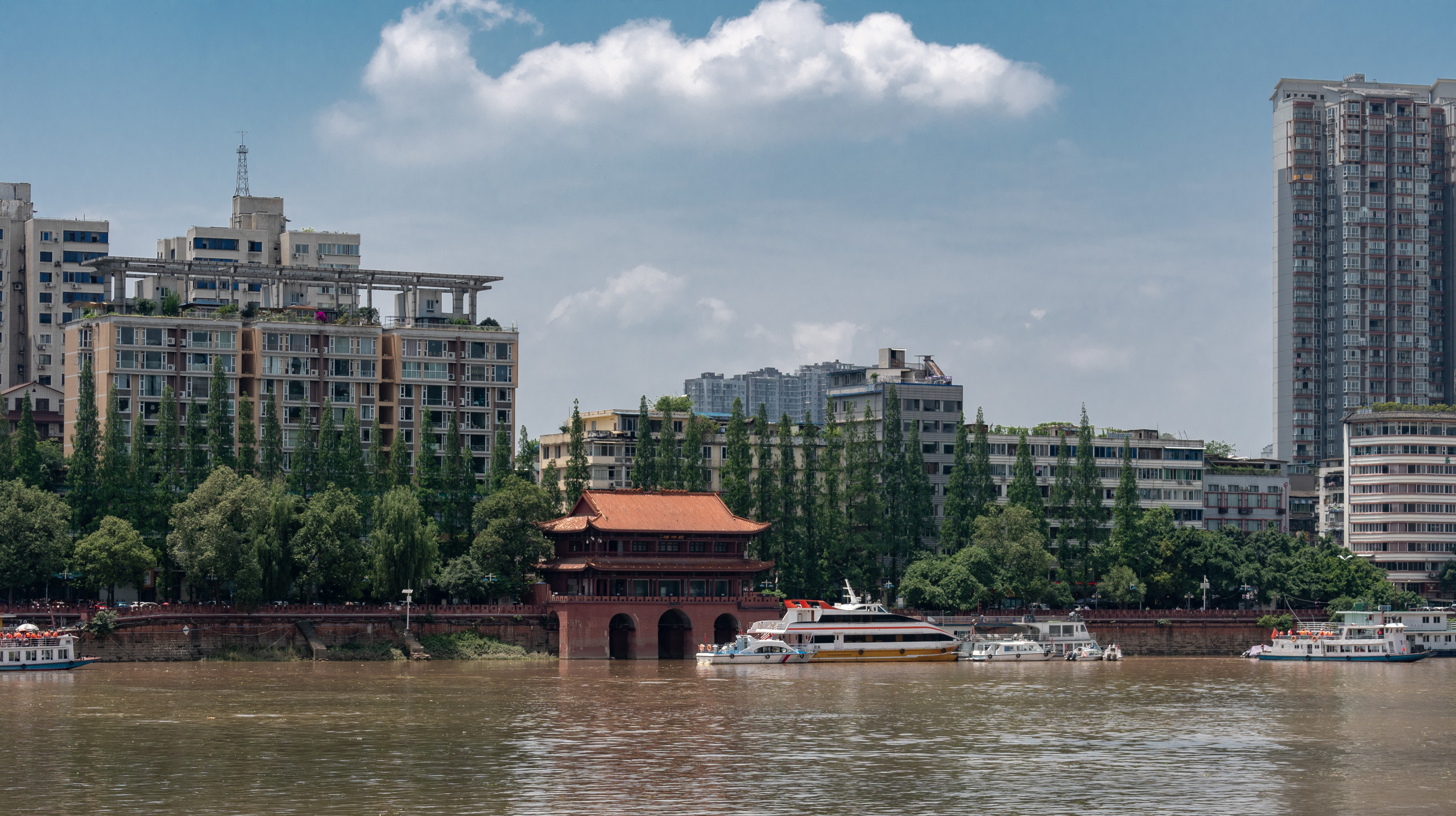

- Location in Sichuan
- Coordinates: 29°33′19″N 103°45′42″E
- Country: China
- Province: Sichuan
- Prefecture-level city: Leshan
- District seat: Haitang Subdistrict

Area
  - Total: 825 km^{2} (319 sq mi)

Population (2020 census)
  - Total: 814,597
  - Density: 987/km^{2} (2,560/sq mi)
- Time zone: UTC+8 (China Standard)
- Website: www.lsszq.gov.cn

Shizhong (Chinese: 市中; pinyin: Shìzhōng; lit. 'city center') is a district of the city of Leshan, Sichuan Province, China.

Leshan Normal University is located in the district.

== Administrative divisions ==
Shizhong District administers 5 subdistricts and 12 towns:

- Dafo Subdistrict (大佛街道)
- Tongjiang Subdistrict (通江街道)
- Haitang Subdistrict (海棠街道)
- Lüxin Subdistrict (绿心街道)
- Quanfu Subdistrict (全福街道)
- Mouzi Town (牟子镇)
- Tuzhu Town (土主镇)
- Baima Town (白马镇)
- Maoqiao Town (茅桥镇)
- Qingping Town (青平镇)
- Suji Town (苏稽镇)
- Shuikou Town (水口镇)
- Angu Town (安谷镇)
- Mianzhu Town (棉竹镇)
- Pingxing Town (平兴镇)
- Yuelai Town (悦来镇)
- Jianfeng Town (剑峰镇)
