= Shawan, Leshan =

Shawan 沙湾区
- District
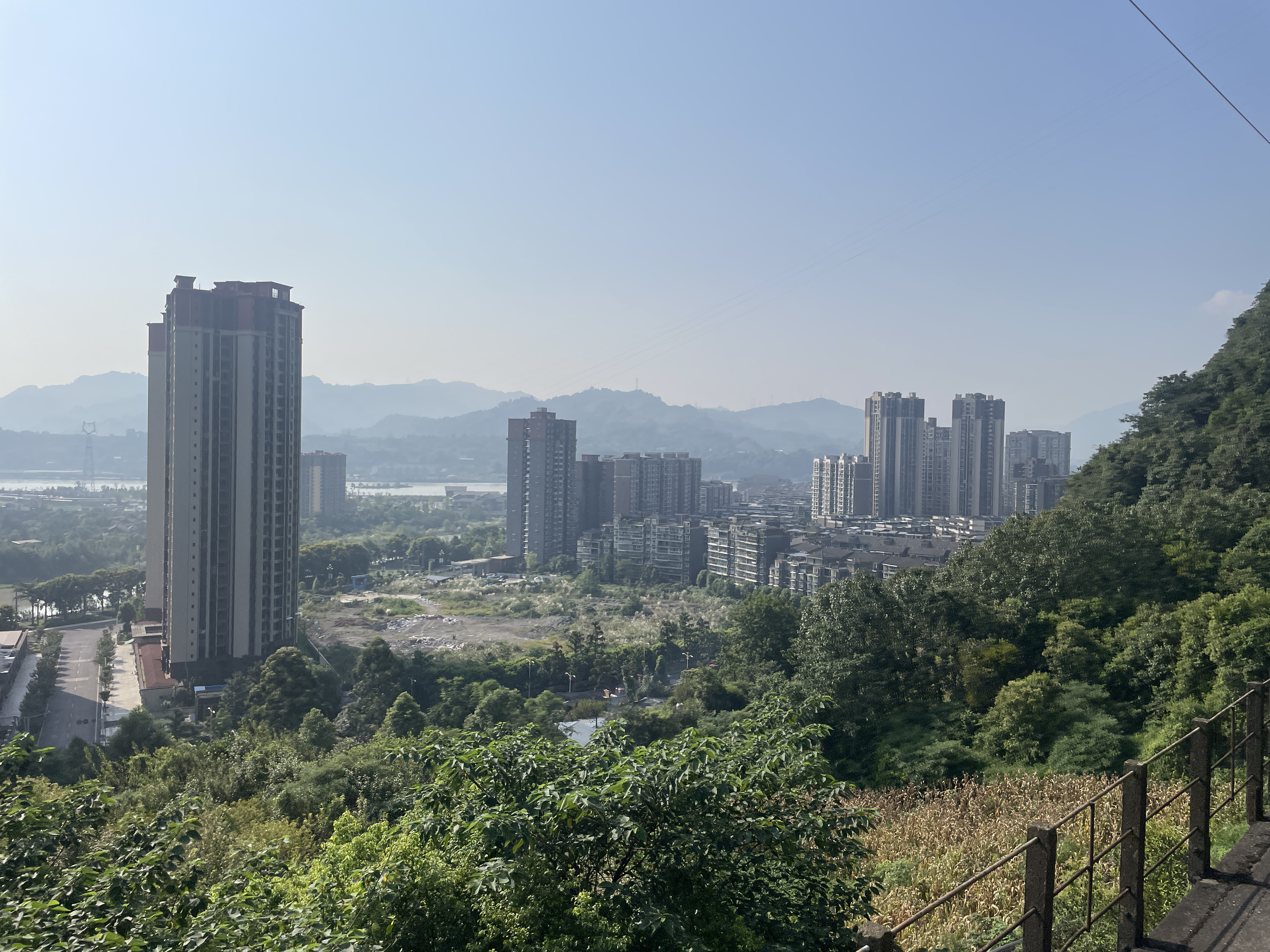

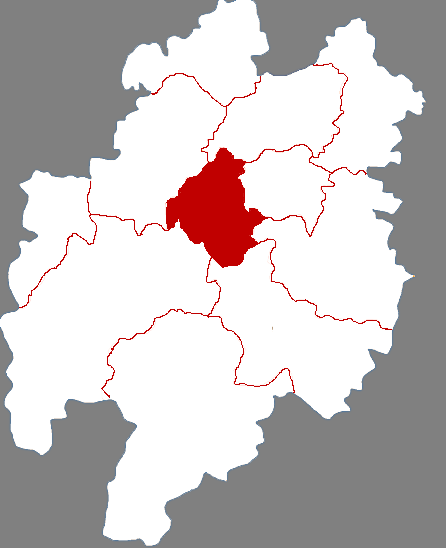
- Shawan in Leshan

- Leshan in Sichuan
- Country: China
- Province: Sichuan
- Prefecture-level city: Leshan

Area
  - Total: 618 km^{2} (239 sq mi)

Population (2020 census)
  - Total: 144,931
  - Density: 235/km^{2} (607/sq mi)
- Time zone: UTC+8 (China Standard)

Shawan District (simplified Chinese: 沙湾区; traditional Chinese: 沙灣區; pinyin: Shāwān Qū) is a district of the city of Leshan, Sichuan Province, China. Shawan is located on the Dadu River around 40 km (25 mi) southwest from what was then called the city of Jiading (Lu) (Chia-ting (Lu), 嘉定(路)), and now is the central urban area of the prefecture-level city of Leshan in Sichuan Province. It is known as the birthplace of Chinese writer Guo Moruo.

== Administrative divisions ==
Shawan District comprises 1 subdistrict and 8 towns:

subdistrict

- Tonghe 铜河街道

towns

- Shawan 沙湾镇
- Jianong 嘉农镇
- Taiping 太平镇
- Fulu 福禄镇
- Niushi 牛石镇
- Hulu 葫芦镇
- Tashui 踏水镇
- Zhenxi 轸溪镇
