= Oriental Buddha Park =

Cultural theme park in Leshan, China

Oriental Buddha Park 东方佛都
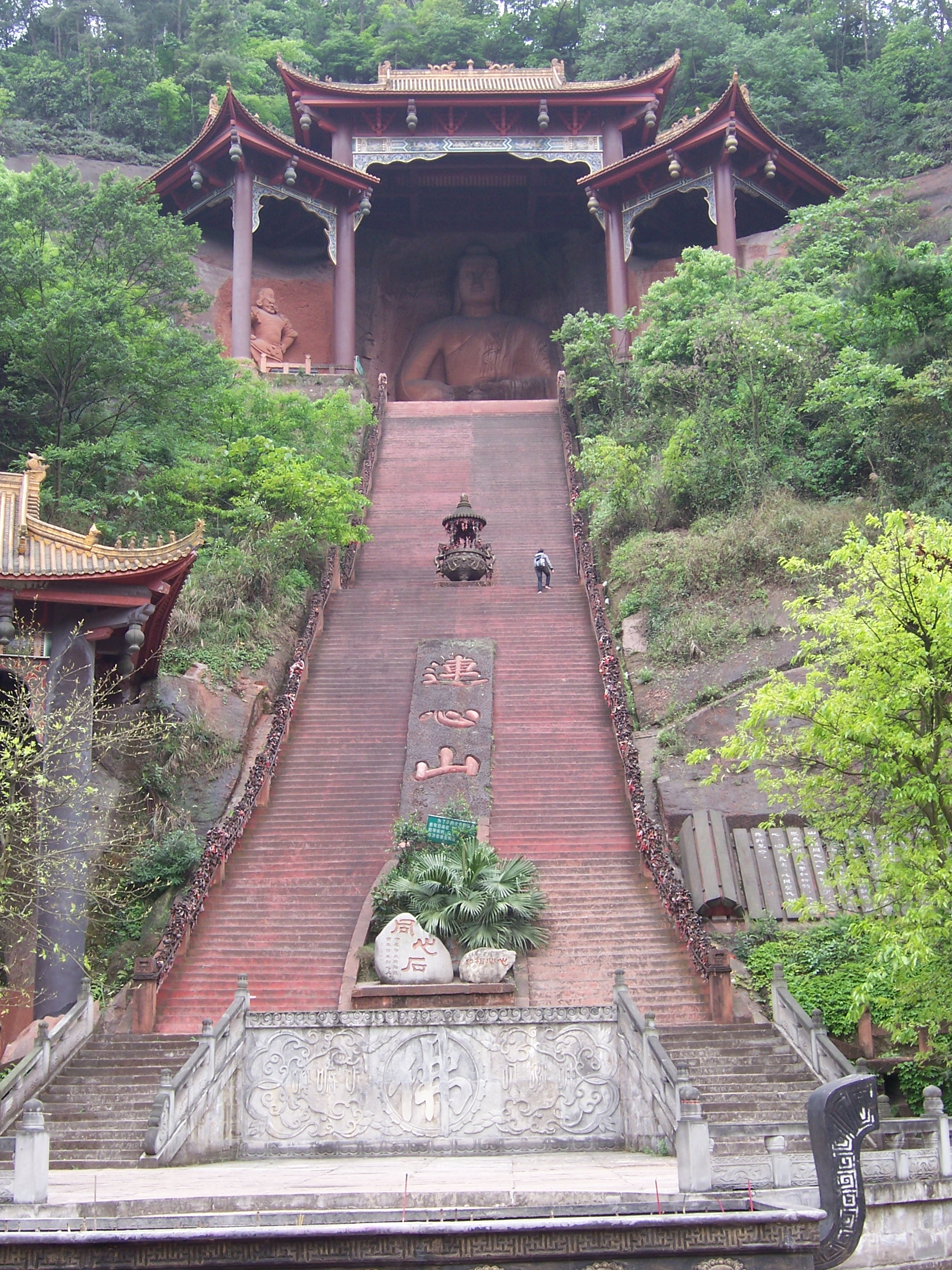
- Location: Leshan, Sichuan, China
- Opened: 1994
- Theme: Buddhism
- Area: 20,000 m^{2} (220,000 sq ft)

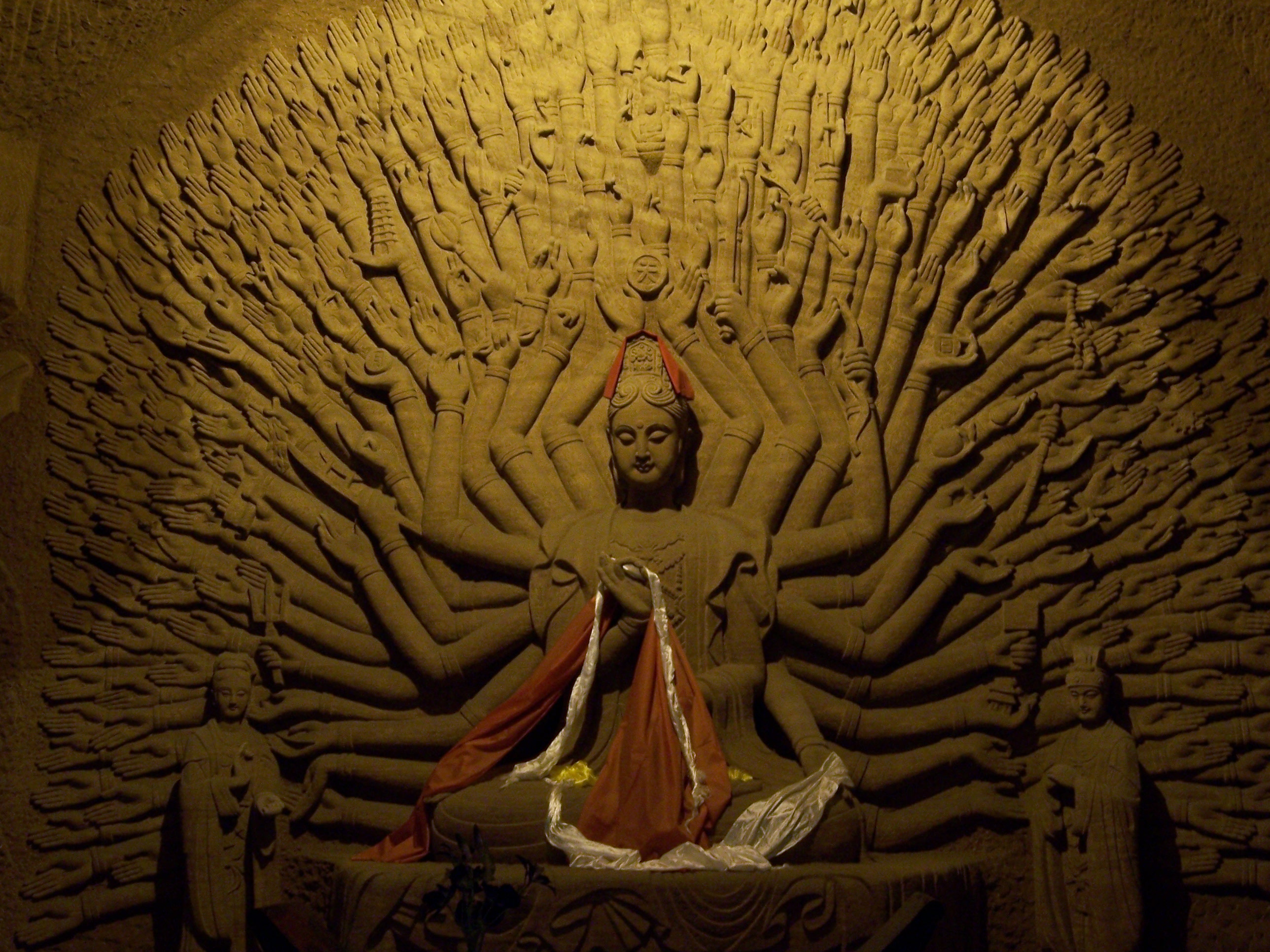
A stone carving in the park.

Oriental Buddha Park is a cultural theme park in Leshan, China featuring reproductions of Buddhist statues and Buddhist themed carvings made from stone, rock, and other materials.

The park is adjacent to the Leshan Giant Buddha, a tall Buddha statue listed as a UNESCO World Heritage Site.

== Private ownership ==
The park is developed and operated by a private firm on a for profit basis. The land for the park was acquired through expropriation of farmland and relocation of its residents (demolishment). Compared to the compensation given for farmland for the expansion of the area for the Leshan Giant Buddha, the compensation for the privately run Oriental Buddha Park was higher than the compensation provided by the local government developing the Leshan Giant Buddha.

The commercial nature of the park next to a heritage site has attracted contentious commentary from academics. Local Leshan scholars Jiaming Luo and Chunjing Zeng in a conference paper pointed out the profit driven nature of the park invited the question of whether a commercial entity "can become the mediator to revitalize the spirit of heritage".

Visitors pay a ticket price to enter the park separate from the entry price of the Leshan Giant Buddha.

== Attractions ==
There are around 3,000 Buddha statues in the park including a 170 meter long sleeping Buddha statue.
