= Leshan Normal University =

University in Leshan, China

Leshan Normal University (LSNU; simplified Chinese: 乐山师范学院; traditional Chinese: 樂山師範學院; pinyin: Lèshān Shīfàn Xuéyuàn) is a public teacher's college in Shizhong District, Leshan, Sichuan, China.

It was formerly known in English as Leshan Teacher's College (LSTC).
