= 2021 Chicago–Evanston shootings =

Spree shooting in Illinois, U.S.

- Location: Chicago, Illinois, U.S.
- Date: January 9, 2021 c. 1:50 p.m – 5:43 p.m. (CDT)
- Attack type: Spree shooting
- Weapon: Glock 21 pistol
- Deaths: 6 (including the perpetrator)
- Injuries: 2
- Perpetrator: Jason Nightengale
- Motive: Unknown

On January 9, 2021, 32-year-old Jason Nightengale shot and killed five people during a shooting spree that began on Chicago's South Side and ended in Evanston before being fatally shot by police.

== Events ==
=== Chicago shootings ===
Sometime before 1:50 PM, Nightengale fatally shot 30-year-old Yiran Fan, a PhD student from China, in the head as he sat in his vehicle in a Hyde Park parking garage. Shortly afterwards, Nightengale entered an apartment building at 4940 S. East End Ave., where he fatally shot doorwoman 46-year-old Aisha Johnson and wounded a 77-year-old-woman in the head as she grabbed her mail.

Next, Nightengale entered another apartment building in the 5500 block of South East End. Here, he stole a red Toyota from an unidentified acquaintance. He drove to the AK Food Mart convenience store at 9307 S. Halsted St, entered, and fatally shot 20-year-old Anthony Faulkner in the head, then shot and injured an 81-year-old woman in the neck and back. Nightengale jumped the counter and robbed the cash register before leaving.

At 4:00 PM, Nightengale shot 15-year-old Damia Smith in the back seat of her mother's vehicle, in the 10300 block of South Halsted Street. Smith would later succumb to her wounds on February 2, 2021.

At an unknown time, Nightengale returned to AK Food Mart and fired at investigating officers. One round struck a police vehicle. No one was injured.

=== Evanston shootings and shooter's death ===
In Evanston, Nightengale fired a shot at a CVS Pharmacy at 101 Asbury Ave., striking no one. He entered an IHOP and shot 61-year-old Marta Torres after allegedly taking her hostage. Torres died from her wounds eight days later. Nightengale fled the scene and was quickly pursued by Evanston Police. As he withdrew in the direction of a Dollar General, Nightengale was shot numerous times by officers. He was pronounced dead at a nearby hospital.
