= Qianwei County =

Qianwei County 犍为县
- County
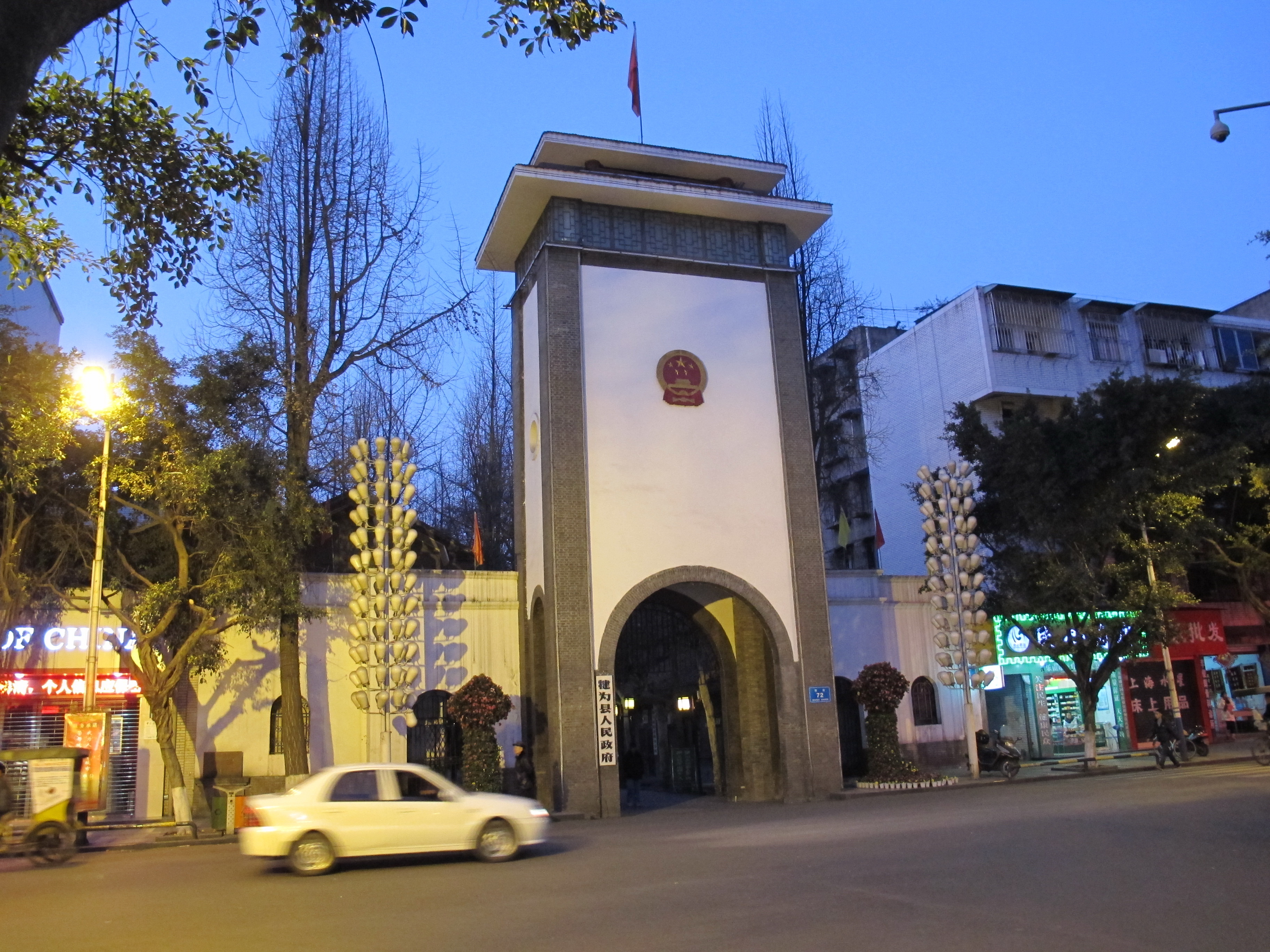

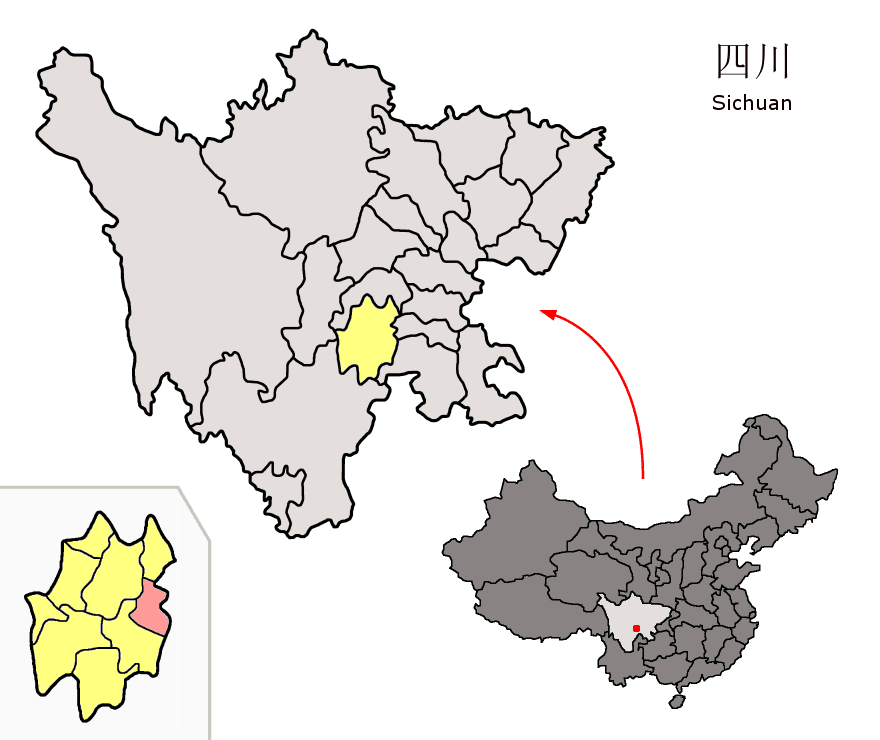
- Location of Qianwei County (red) within Leshan City (yellow) and Sichuan
- Country: China
- Province: Sichuan
- Prefecture-level city: Leshan

Area
  - Total: 1,375 km^{2} (531 sq mi)

Population (2020 census)
  - Total: 416,673
  - Density: 303.0/km^{2} (784.9/sq mi)
- Time zone: UTC+8 (China Standard)

Qianwei County (simplified Chinese: 犍为县; traditional Chinese: 犍為縣; pinyin: Qiánwèi Xiàn) is a county in the central part of Sichuan Province, China. It is under the administration of Leshan City.

== Administrative divisions ==
Qianwei County comprises 15 towns:

- Yujin 玉津镇
- Xiaogu 孝姑镇
- Shixi 石溪镇
- Qingxi 清溪镇
- Luocheng 罗城镇
- Bagou 芭沟镇
- Longkong 龙孔镇
- Dingwen 定文镇
- Wuyu 舞雩镇
- Yuping 玉屏镇
- Daxing 大兴镇
- Jiujing 九井镇
- Tielu 铁炉镇
- Shoubao 寿保镇
- Shuangxi 双溪镇

== Climate ==
Climate data for Qianwei, elevation 388 m (1,273 ft), (1991–2020 normals, extremes 1981–present)
Month	Jan	Feb	Mar	Apr	May	Jun	Jul	Aug	Sep	Oct	Nov	Dec	Year
Record high °C (°F)	20.6 (69.1)	24.0 (75.2)	32.3 (90.1)	34.7 (94.5)	37.5 (99.5)	36.8 (98.2)	40.2 (104.4)	42.7 (108.9)	36.8 (98.2)	30.8 (87.4)	25.5 (77.9)	19.5 (67.1)	42.7 (108.9)
Mean daily maximum °C (°F)	10.5 (50.9)	13.6 (56.5)	18.6 (65.5)	24.2 (75.6)	27.6 (81.7)	29.4 (84.9)	31.7 (89.1)	31.3 (88.3)	26.7 (80.1)	21.6 (70.9)	17.3 (63.1)	11.7 (53.1)	22.0 (71.6)
Daily mean °C (°F)	7.5 (45.5)	10.0 (50.0)	14.1 (57.4)	19.0 (66.2)	22.4 (72.3)	24.6 (76.3)	26.7 (80.1)	26.3 (79.3)	22.7 (72.9)	18.2 (64.8)	14.0 (57.2)	8.9 (48.0)	17.9 (64.2)
Mean daily minimum °C (°F)	5.5 (41.9)	7.6 (45.7)	11.0 (51.8)	15.3 (59.5)	18.6 (65.5)	21.2 (70.2)	23.3 (73.9)	23.0 (73.4)	20.1 (68.2)	16.2 (61.2)	11.9 (53.4)	7.1 (44.8)	15.1 (59.1)
Record low °C (°F)	−2.0 (28.4)	0.0 (32.0)	0.6 (33.1)	5.6 (42.1)	10.7 (51.3)	15.2 (59.4)	17.9 (64.2)	17.6 (63.7)	14.2 (57.6)	5.3 (41.5)	2.5 (36.5)	−1.7 (28.9)	−2.0 (28.4)
Average precipitation mm (inches)	15.9 (0.63)	21.5 (0.85)	39.0 (1.54)	77.6 (3.06)	92.6 (3.65)	139.6 (5.50)	212.7 (8.37)	267.2 (10.52)	119.7 (4.71)	61.0 (2.40)	31.3 (1.23)	16.6 (0.65)	1,094.7 (43.11)
Average precipitation days (≥ 0.1 mm)	10.3	10.4	13.1	14.3	15.3	16.6	15.6	14.9	16.5	16.8	10.4	10.4	164.6
Average snowy days	0.4	0.3	0	0	0	0	0	0	0	0	0	0.2	0.9
Average relative humidity (%)	82	78	74	73	73	79	81	81	84	85	83	83	80
Mean monthly sunshine hours	37.1	50.5	89.6	116.6	122.0	101.6	137.2	146.9	73.0	47.9	49.7	34.3	1,006.4
Percentage possible sunshine	11	16	24	30	29	24	32	36	20	14	16	11	22
Source: China Meteorological Administration all-time extreme temperature all-time January highall-time July high
