= Muchuan County =

Muchuan County 沐川县
- County
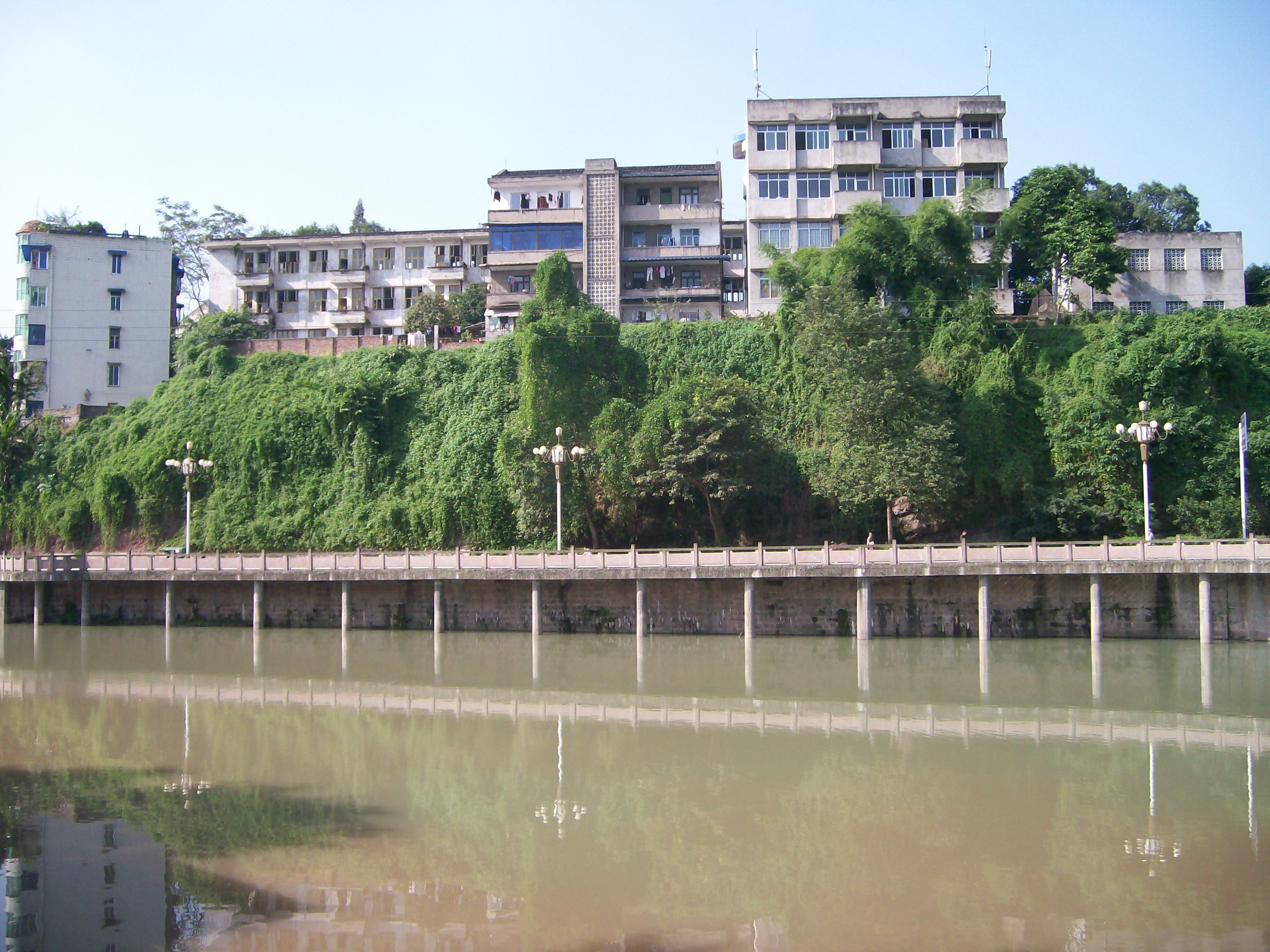

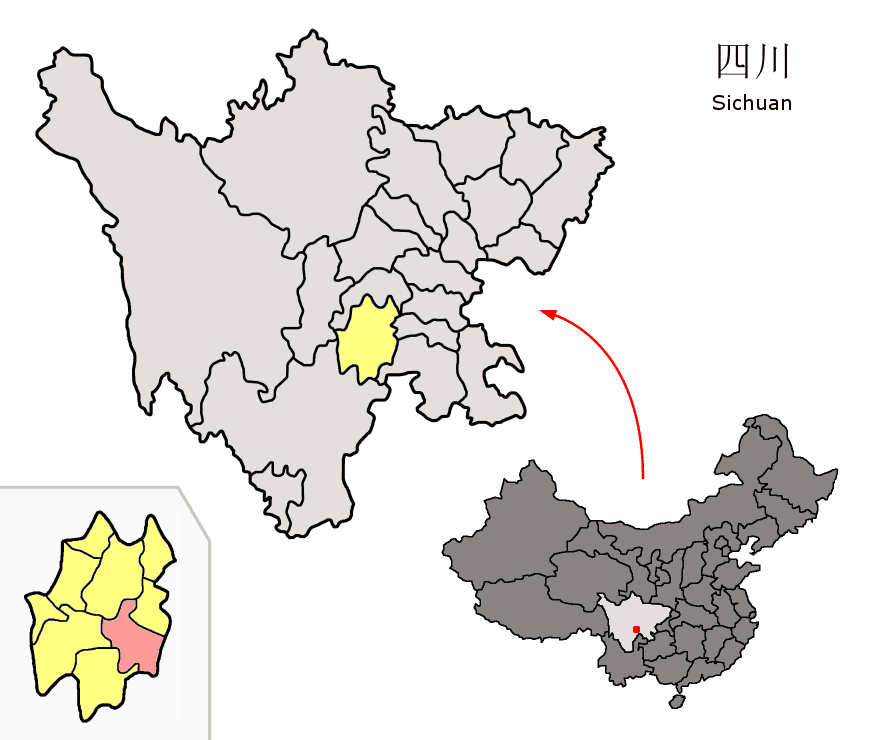
- Location of Muchuan County (red) within Leshan City (yellow) and Sichuan
- Country: China
- Province: Sichuan
- Prefecture-level city: Leshan

Area
  - Total: 1,401 km^{2} (541 sq mi)

Population (2010)
  - Total: 216,737
  - Density: 154.7/km^{2} (400.7/sq mi)
- Time zone: UTC+8 (China Standard)

Muchuan County (Chinese: 沐川县; pinyin: Mùchuān Xiàn) is a county of Sichuan Province, China. It is under the administration of Leshan city.

== Administrative divisions ==
Muchuan County comprises 8 towns and 5 townships:

towns

- Muxi 沐溪镇
- Yongfu 永福镇
- Danan 大楠镇
- Jianban 箭板镇
- Zhouba 舟坝镇
- Huangdan 黄丹镇
- Lidian 利店镇
- Fuxin 富新镇

townships

- Dibao 底堡乡
- Yangcun 杨村乡
- Gaosun 高笋乡
- Cizhu 茨竹乡
- Wusheng 武圣乡

== Climate ==
Climate data for Muchuan, elevation 424 m (1,391 ft), (1991–2020 normals, extremes 1981–present)
Month	Jan	Feb	Mar	Apr	May	Jun	Jul	Aug	Sep	Oct	Nov	Dec	Year
Record high °C (°F)	20.7 (69.3)	25.0 (77.0)	32.7 (90.9)	34.2 (93.6)	37.1 (98.8)	36.9 (98.4)	40.4 (104.7)	41.9 (107.4)	37.1 (98.8)	31.0 (87.8)	26.0 (78.8)	20.5 (68.9)	41.9 (107.4)
Mean daily maximum °C (°F)	10.4 (50.7)	13.3 (55.9)	18.3 (64.9)	23.9 (75.0)	27.3 (81.1)	29.3 (84.7)	31.6 (88.9)	31.3 (88.3)	26.6 (79.9)	21.5 (70.7)	17.2 (63.0)	11.8 (53.2)	21.9 (71.4)
Daily mean °C (°F)	7.2 (45.0)	9.6 (49.3)	13.5 (56.3)	18.3 (64.9)	21.7 (71.1)	24.0 (75.2)	26.1 (79.0)	25.8 (78.4)	22.3 (72.1)	17.9 (64.2)	13.7 (56.7)	8.8 (47.8)	17.4 (63.3)
Mean daily minimum °C (°F)	5.2 (41.4)	7.2 (45.0)	10.4 (50.7)	14.6 (58.3)	17.9 (64.2)	20.7 (69.3)	22.7 (72.9)	22.5 (72.5)	19.8 (67.6)	15.9 (60.6)	11.7 (53.1)	6.9 (44.4)	14.6 (58.3)
Record low °C (°F)	−2.6 (27.3)	−0.5 (31.1)	0.7 (33.3)	5.7 (42.3)	9.8 (49.6)	13.5 (56.3)	16.1 (61.0)	16.7 (62.1)	12.1 (53.8)	5.8 (42.4)	1.7 (35.1)	−1.6 (29.1)	−2.6 (27.3)
Average precipitation mm (inches)	23.7 (0.93)	28.2 (1.11)	51.3 (2.02)	83.8 (3.30)	113.3 (4.46)	157.4 (6.20)	248.6 (9.79)	285.3 (11.23)	153.6 (6.05)	74.7 (2.94)	41.2 (1.62)	26.1 (1.03)	1,287.2 (50.68)
Average precipitation days (≥ 0.1 mm)	14.4	13.7	15.9	15.9	16.4	18.6	17.9	16.6	18.4	19.8	14.3	14.2	196.1
Average snowy days	0.8	0.3	0	0	0	0	0	0	0	0	0	0.3	1.4
Average relative humidity (%)	86	84	81	79	79	83	83	83	86	87	86	87	84
Mean monthly sunshine hours	38.4	45.6	81.8	119.0	124.8	103.8	134.7	148.8	73.4	46.6	48.5	38.7	1,004.1
Percentage possible sunshine	12	14	22	31	30	25	32	37	20	13	15	12	22
Source: China Meteorological Administrationall-time extreme temperatureall-time July high
