= Yizhou Circuit =

- Chinese: 益州路
Transcriptions

Yizhou Circuit or Yizhou Province was one of the major circuits during the Song dynasty. It was split from Xichuan Circuit in 1001. It was renamed Chengdufu Circuit in 1059.

Its administrative area corresponds to roughly modern central Sichuan.
