= Leshan =

Leshan 乐山市
- Prefecture-level city
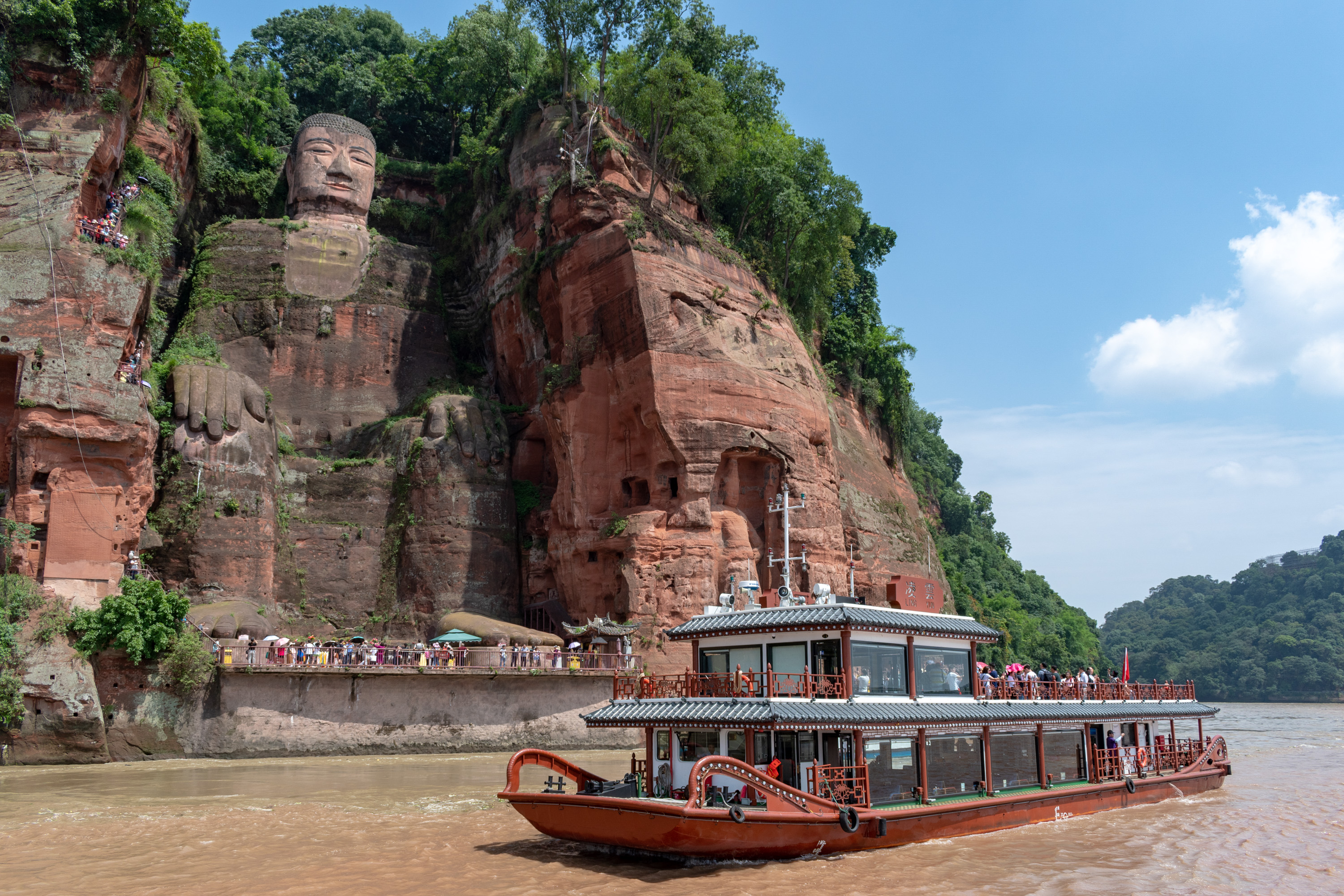
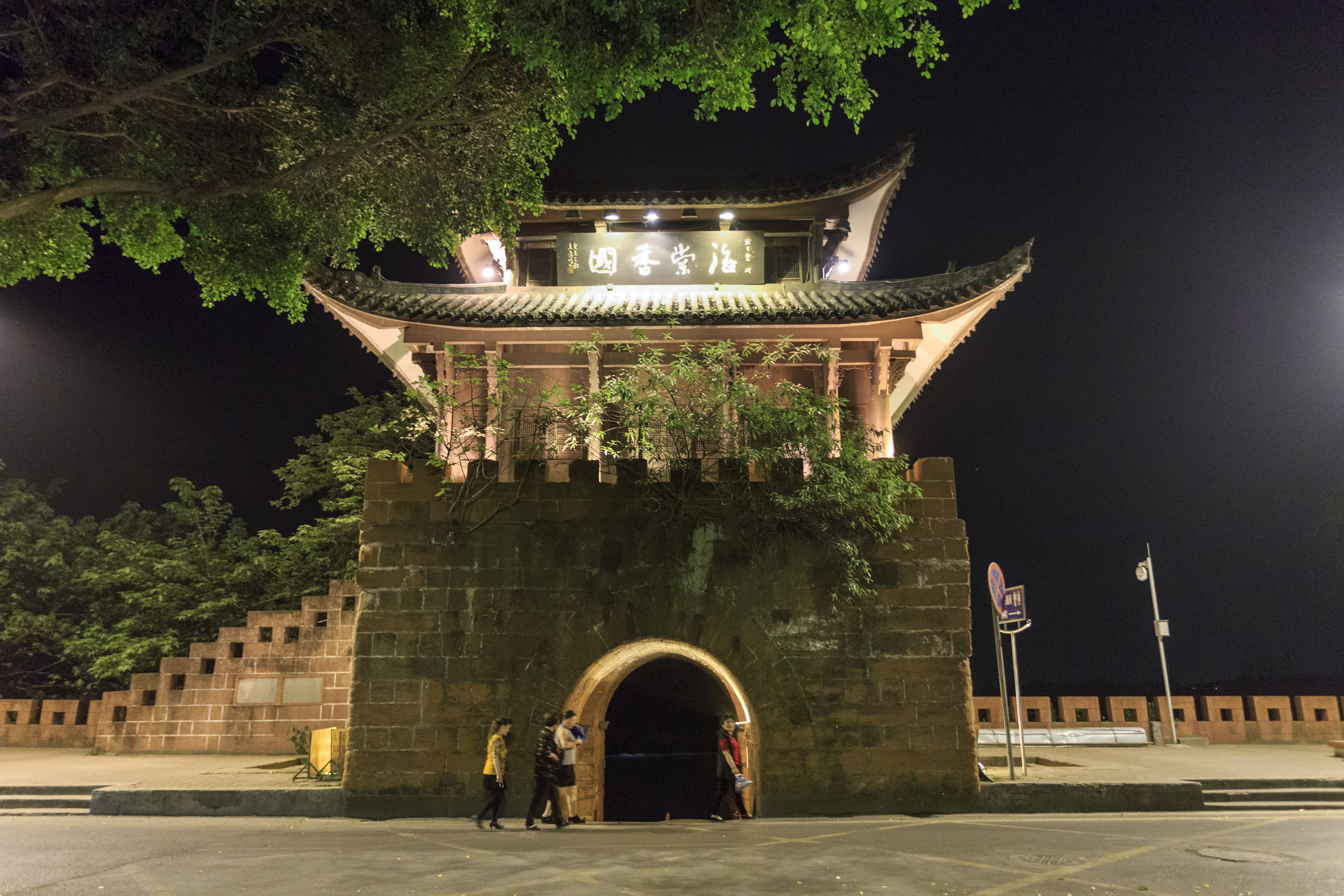
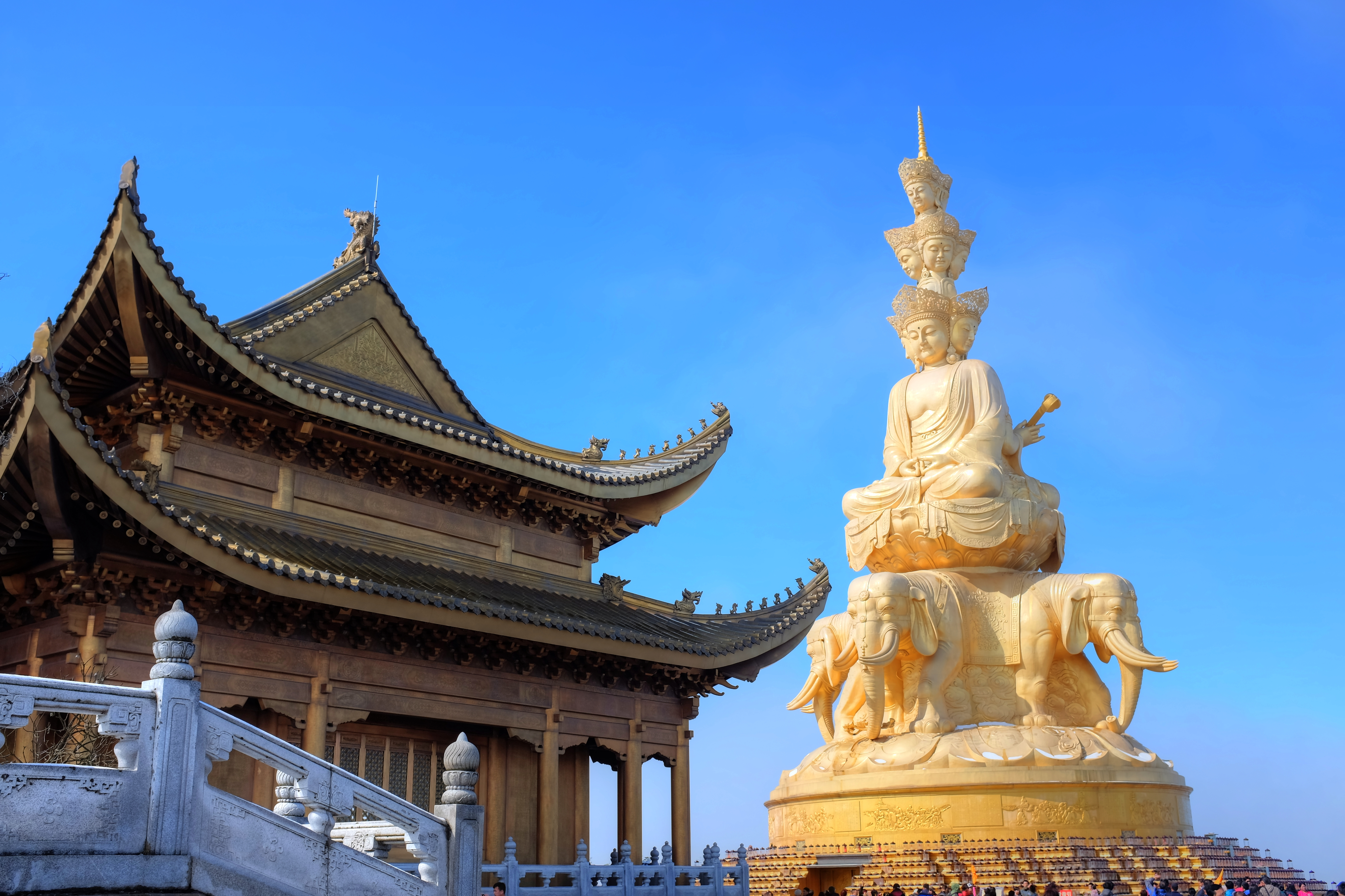
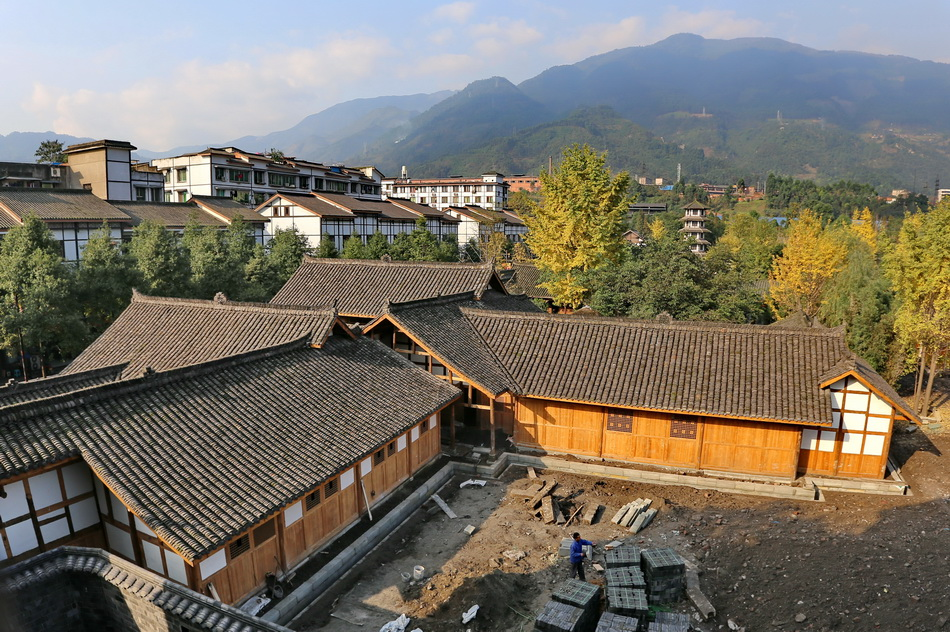
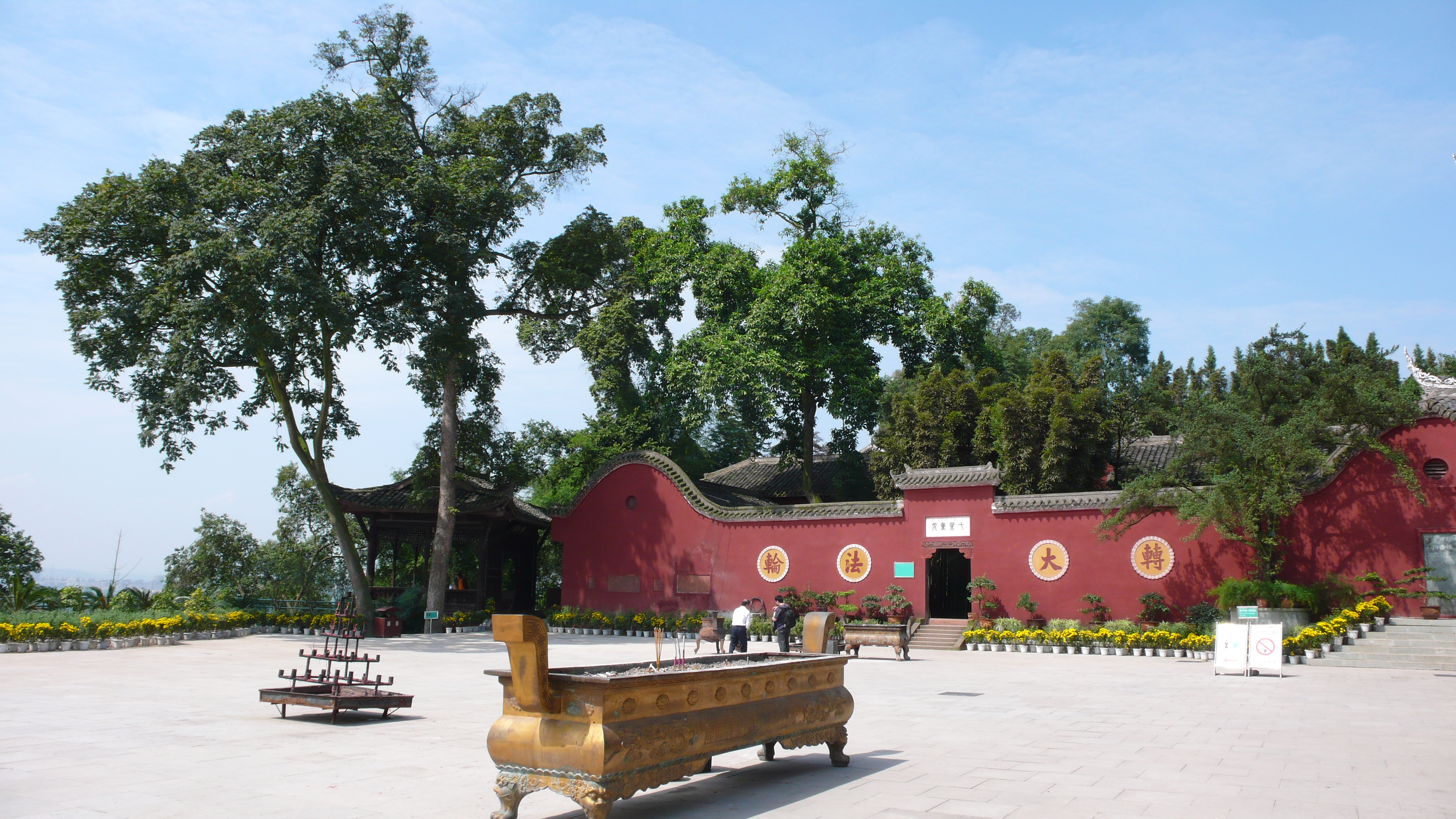
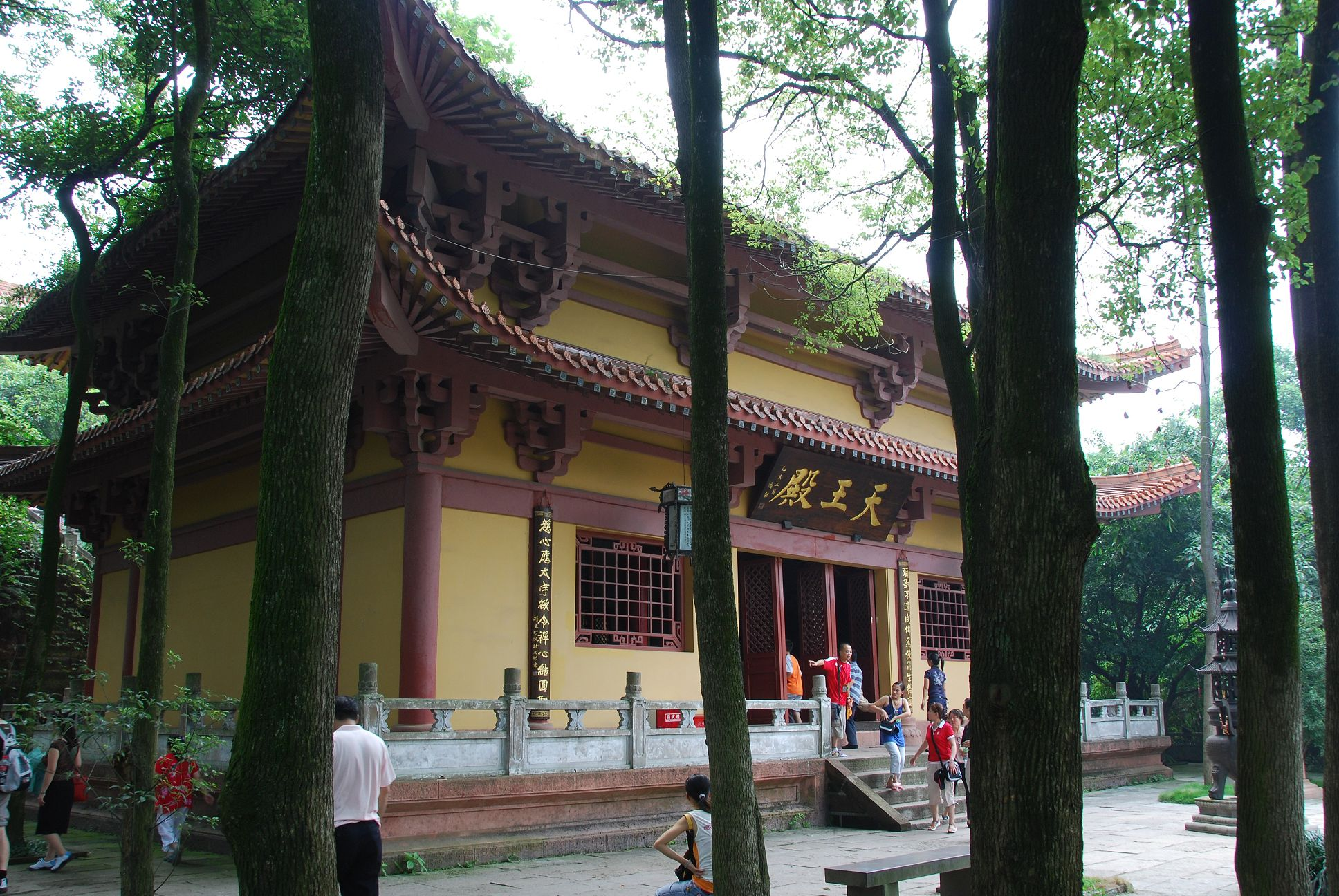
- Leshan Giant Buddha Lizheng Gate Jinding Shawan District Wuyou Temple Shizhong Temple

- Location of Leshan City jurisdiction in Sichuan
- Coordinates (Seat of Leshan municipal government): 29°33′07″N 103°45′58″E
- Country: People's Republic of China
- Province: Sichuan
- County-level divisions: 4 Counties, 2 Autonomous Counties, 1 County-level city and 4 Districts
- Municipal seat: Shizhong District

Area
  - Prefecture-level city: 12,827.49 km^{2} (4,952.72 sq mi)
  - Urban: 1,918.5 km^{2} (740.7 sq mi)
  - Metro: 836.1 km^{2} (322.8 sq mi)

Population (2020 census)
  - Prefecture-level city: 3,160,168
  - Density: 246.3590/km^{2} (638.0670/sq mi)
  - Urban: 1,236,188
  - Urban density: 644.35/km^{2} (1,668.9/sq mi)
  - Metro: 1,236,188
  - Metro density: 1,479/km^{2} (3,829/sq mi)

GDP
  - Prefecture-level city: CN¥ 130.1 billion US$ 20.9 billion
  - Per capita: CN¥ 39,973; US$ 6,418
- Time zone: UTC+8 (China Standard)
- Postal code: 614000
- Area code: 0833
- ISO 3166 code: CN-SC-11
- Licence Plate Prefixes: 川L
- Website: leshan.gov.cn

Leshan
- "Leshan" in Simplified (top) and Traditional (bottom) Chinese characters
- Simplified Chinese: 乐山
- Traditional Chinese: 樂山
Transcriptions
Standard Mandarin
- Hanyu Pinyin: Lèshān
- Wade–Giles: Le^{4}-shan^{1}
- IPA: [lɤ̂ʂán] (locally) [nʊʔ˧sã˥]
Yue: Cantonese
- Yale Romanization: Lohk-sāan
- Jyutping: Lok6-saan1
- IPA: [lɔk̚˨ san˥]
Southern Min
- Hokkien POJ: Lo̍k-san

Jiading
- Chinese: 嘉定
Transcriptions
Standard Mandarin
- Hanyu Pinyin: Jiādìng
- Wade–Giles: Chia-ting

Leshan, formerly known as Jiading (Note: Also previously romanized as Kea-ting or Kea-ting Foo.) and Jiazhou, is a prefecture-level city located at the confluence of the Dadu, Min and Qingyi rivers in Sichuan province, China. By the end of 2024, the registered population of the city is 3.45 million. About 120 km (75 mi) from the provincial capital Chengdu, Leshan is a transportation hub and regional center in southern Sichuan. A historical and cultural city, Leshan is famous for world heritage sites Mount Emei and Leshan Giant Buddha, as well as for its rich food culture.

== History ==
Leshan has a long history, with written records tracing back to around 700 BC during the Kai Ming dynasty of the Shu Kingdom. During the early part of what is termed the Spring and Autumn period, the Ba people, led by Kai Ming Bie Ling, migrated from western Hubei and settled at the confluence of the three rivers in what is now Leshan, including present-day Fengzhouba and the Dadu River. They established a tribal center. From the Qin and Han dynasties through to the Wei and Jin dynasties, the central government set up Nan'an County, laying the foundation for the present-day Leshan region.

After the Sui unification of China, Leshan was part of Meishan Prefecture (jun). In the third year of the Kaihuang reign (583 AD) of the Sui dynasty, the prefecture system was changed to a two-tier system of state (zhou) and counties. During the Tang dynasty's Zhenguan reign, Leshan became part of Jiazhou. In the Northern Song's Chongning reign, Leshan belonged to Jiading Prefecture, which administered five counties. During the reign of Emperor Ningzong of the Southern Song, Jiazhou was elevated to a prefecture and renamed Jiading Prefecture, marking the first use of the name "Jiading." During the Song and Yuan dynasties, Leshan's status rose from a prefecture to a province (lu), becoming the third-largest city in Sichuan, after Chengdu and Chongqing. In the twelfth year of Emperor Yongzheng's reign (1734 AD) of the Qing dynasty, Jiading Prefecture was established again.

In the early years of the Republic of China, from 1912 to 1917, Leshan was restructured into a county under the jurisdiction of the Sichuan Provincial Governor's Office. After Yuan Shikai's death, Sichuan broke away from central authority; by 1918, Xiong Kewu took control of Sichuan, implementing the "Defense Zone System," which decentralized military, political, financial, and tax powers to local garrisons, leading to warlordism and prolonged unrest in the region for 18 years. During this time, Leshan was successively controlled by Chen Hongfan, Liu Wenhui, and Liu Xiang, with local officials appointed by the stationed troops.

After the Mukden Incident, the Nationalist government relocated the treasures from Beijing's Forbidden City to Shanghai, then Nanjing, and a significant portion eventually ended up in Leshan, including Emei and Angu, while the rest of them stored in Baxian (now Banan, Chongqing). The Forbidden City artifacts were stored in Leshan from July 1939, when the first batch arrived, until March 1947, when the last batch was transported out. In addition, during the Second Sino-Japanese War, Wuhan University and Jiangsu Sericulture College moved to Leshan, Sichuan University to Mount Emei, National Central Academy of Arts and Crafts was established at Renjiaba in Leshan, and Fuxing Academy was founded at Wuyou Temple in Leshan. Wuhan University left Leshan in June 1946.

After the founding of the People's Republic, some of the area of Leshan was ceded to Emeishan city in 1958. Until 1978, Leshan had three districts of Shizhong (means downtown), Wutongqiao (literally 5-"tong"-bridge) and Shawan (literally sand bay). In 1978, Leshan as a county-level city was formed. In 1985, Leshan became a prefecture-level city, with Emeishan and other county level cities under the administration of Leshan.

== Culture ==
=== Tourist attractions ===
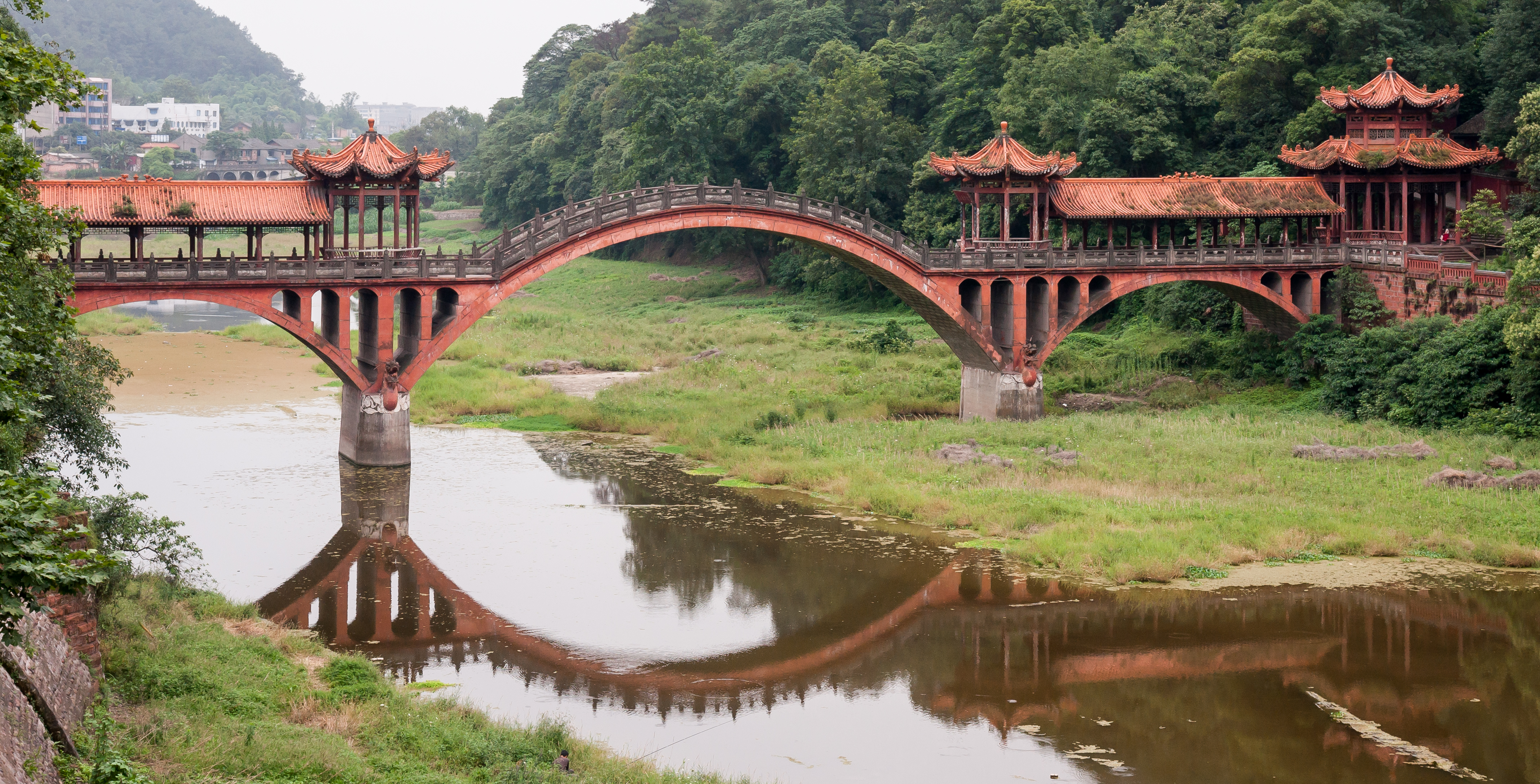
Stone arch bridge in Leshan

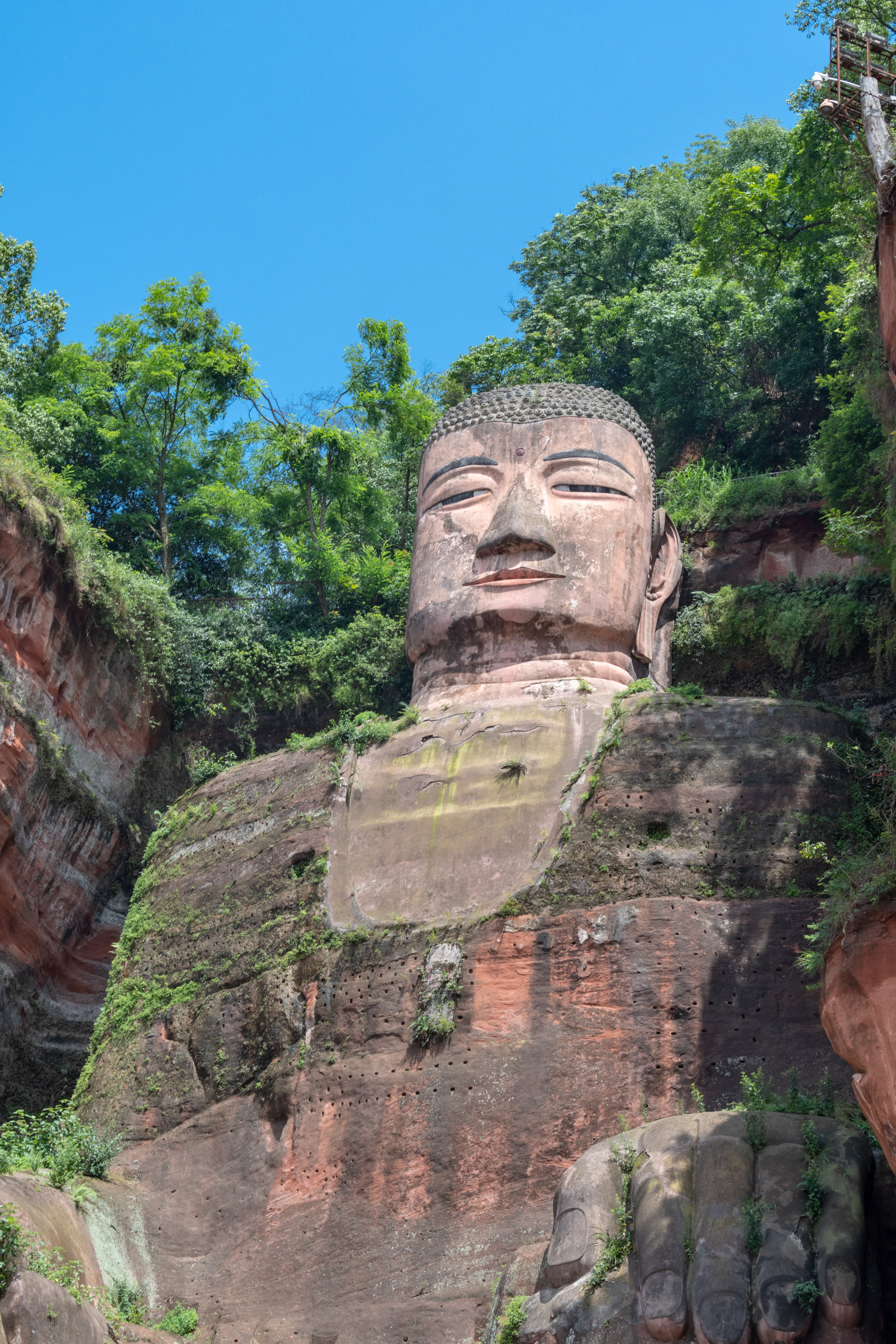
Leshan Giant Buddha

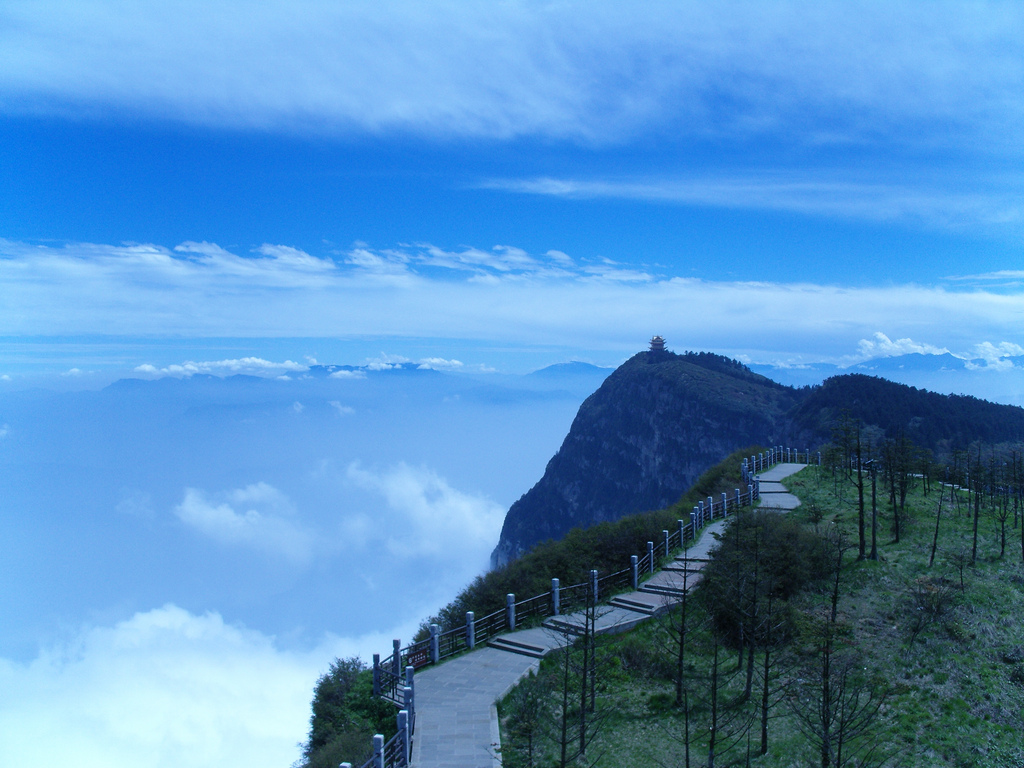
Mount Emei

In 1996, the Mount Emei Scenic Area, including the Leshan Giant Buddha, the largest stone-carved buddha in the world, was declared a World Heritage Site by UNESCO. Next to the Leshan Giant Buddha is the Oriental Buddha Park, a privately run cultural theme park, featuring thousands of reproductions of Buddha statues and Buddhist themed carvings. Mount Emei is located within the county-level city of Emeishan, which is under the administrative jurisdiction of Leshan.

The ancestral home of Chinese writer, academic and politician Guo Moruo is preserved in the Shawan District of Leshan.

=== Dialect ===
The Leshan dialect is distinct among the dialects in Sichuan province for retaining the entering tone, the fourth of the four tones in classical Chinese pronunciation, which most Sichuan dialects and Mandarin no longer use. Unlike other Sichuan dialects, most of which are mutually understandable, the Leshan dialect is difficult for other Sichuan people to understand.

=== Food ===
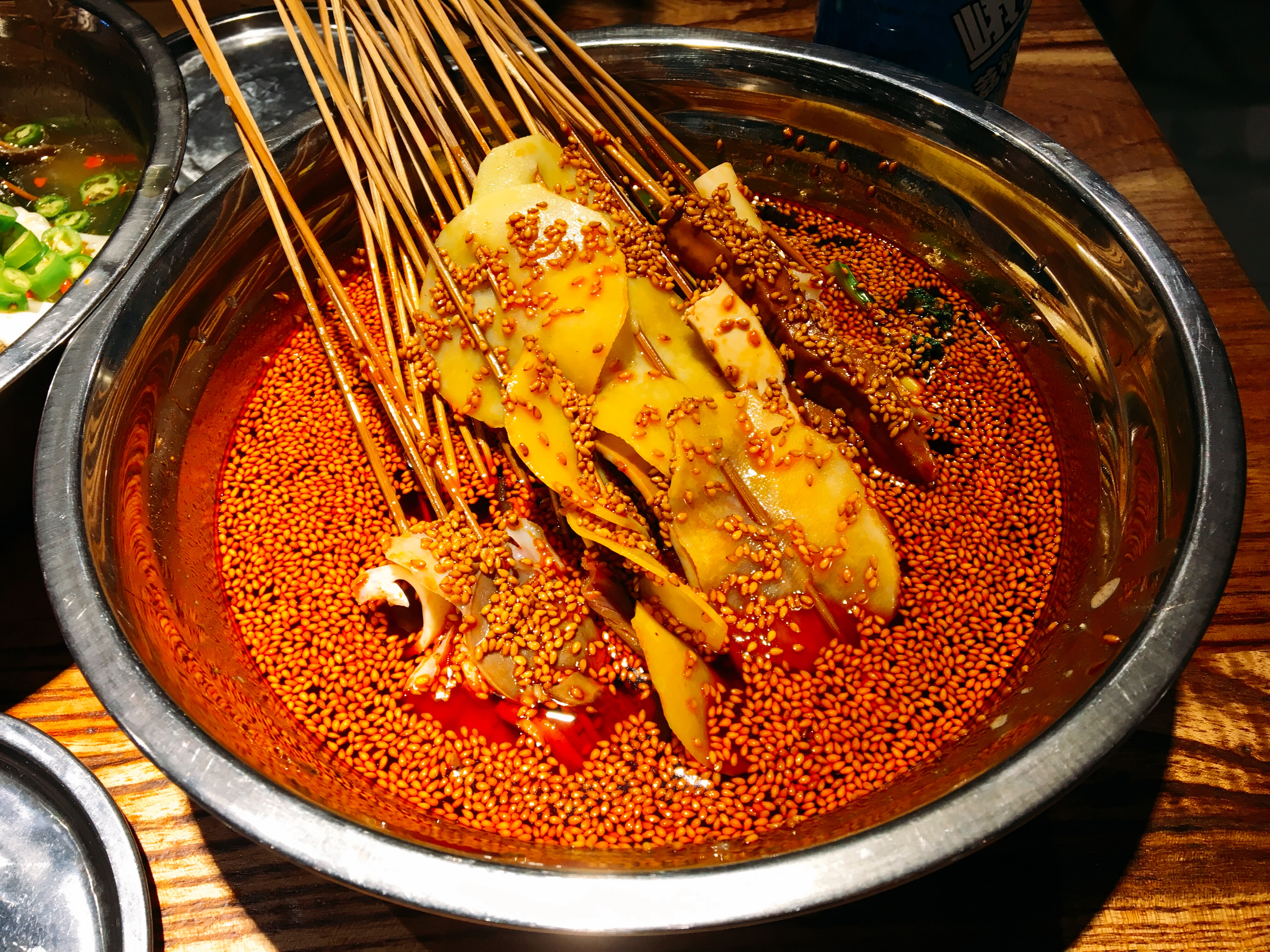
Boboji (Bobo chicken)

Falling into the Sichuan cuisine family, Leshan is noted for its food culture, especially its variety of street foods. Typical specialties include:

- Malatang (麻辣烫) - Sichuan Spicy Numbing Hot Pot Bowl
- Boboji (钵钵鸡) - Skewered Chicken in Chili Broth
- Shaokao (烧烤) - Street BBQ Skewers
- Qianwei Bobing (犍为薄饼) - Qianwei Thin Pancakes with Fillings
- Qianwei Doufugan/Kaka'er (犍为豆腐干/咔咔儿) - Crispy Qianwei Dried Tofu with Fillings and Sweet-and-Sour Chili Sauce
- Ka Bing (咔饼) - Savory Grilled Flatbread with Beef
- Doufunao (豆腐脑) - Silken Tofu Custard Broth
- Tianpiya (甜皮鸭) - Sweet-skinned Duck
- Yanxunya (烟熏鸭) - Smoked Duck
- Qiaojiao Niurou (翘脚牛肉) - "Foot-Lift Beef" (Beef and Offals in Herbal Broth)
- Xiba Doufu (西坝豆腐) - Xiba Tofu
- Youzha (油炸) - Deep-Fried Street Skewers
- Ye'er Ba (叶儿粑) - Sticky Rice Dumplings Wrapped in Leaves
- Linjiang Shansi (临江鳝丝) - Shredded Eel in Chili Sauce

== Transport ==
There are Chengdu–Mianyang–Leshan intercity railway and Chengdu–Guiyang high-speed railway serving Leshan.

The G0512 Chengdu–Leshan Expressway with a total length of 160 kilometers, was finished on January 14, 2000. This Freeway has since become very important to the city's development.

Leshan Railway Station (乐山站), located in Leshan City, Sichuan Province, China, is also a comprehensive transportation hub integrating railway, bus, coach, taxi and other modes of transportation, which was put into use on December 20, 2014.

== Education ==
Leshan Normal University (乐山师范学院) and Leshan Vocational & Technical College (乐山职业技术学院) are two government-funded colleges in the city.

The Engineering&Technical College of Chengdu University of Technology (成都理工大学工程技术学院) is a non-government college, which was established in 2003.

== Administrative divisions ==
Map
Name	Hanzi	Hanyu Pinyin	Population (2020 census)	Area (km^{2})	Density (/km^{2})
Shizhong District	市中区	Shìzhōng Qū	814,597	825	987
Shawan District	沙湾区	Shāwān Qū	144,931	617	235
Wutongqiao District	五通桥区	Wǔtōngqiáo Qū	237,933	474	502
Jinkouhe District	金口河区	Jīnkǒuhé Qū	38,727	598	65
Emeishan City	峨眉山市	Éméishān Shì	419,107	1,168	359
Qianwei County	犍为县	Qiánwéi Xiàn	416,673	1,375	303
Jingyan County	井研县	Jǐngyán Xiàn	280,641	841	334
Jiajiang County	夹江县	Jiājiāng Xiàn	305,441	749	408
Muchuan County	沐川县	Mùchuān Xiàn	192,313	1,401	130
Ebian Yi Autonomous County	峨边彝族自治县	Ébiān Yízú; Zìzhìxiàn	121,554	2,395	51
Mabian Yi Autonomous County	马边彝族自治县	Mǎbiān Yízú; Zìzhìxiàn	188,251	2,383	79

== Population ==
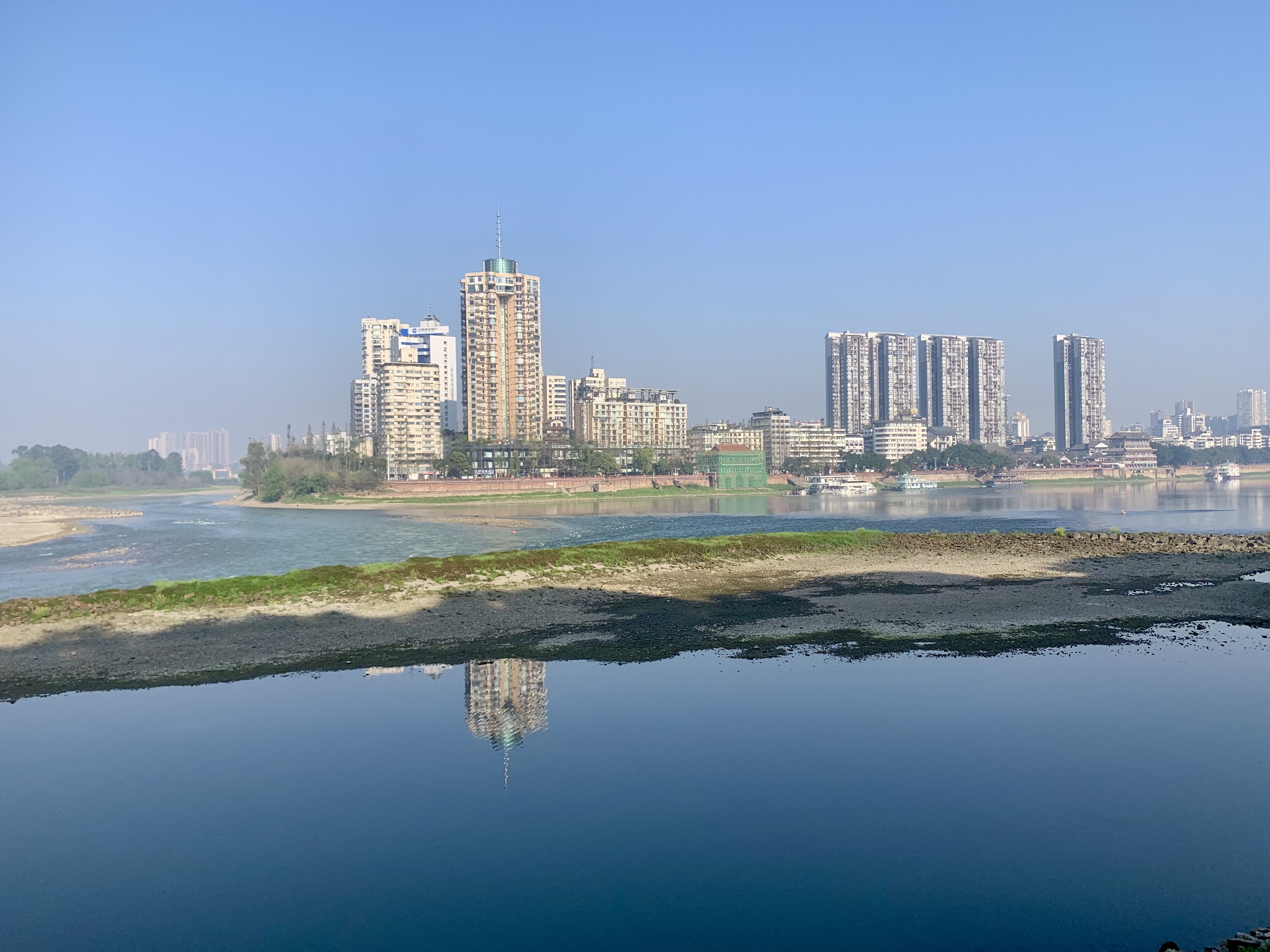
Leshan city

According to the Seventh national census in 2020, the city's resident population stood at 3,160,168, a decrease of 75,591 or 2.34% over the Sixth national census. The average annual decrease was 0.24 per cent. Of these, the male population is 1,585,671, or 50.18 per cent, and the female population is 1,574,497 or 49.82 per cent. The Seven ratio of the total population (100 females) is 100.71, a 0.95 decrease from the Sixth census.The population aged 0–14 years is 446,056, or 14.11 per cent; the population aged 15–59 years is 774,179, or 24.50 per cent; and the population aged 65 and over is 606,448, or 19.19 per cent. The Han Chinese population is 2,953,987, accounting for 93.48 percent; the ethnic minorities are 206,181 or 6.52 percent; and the Yi population is 193,199 or 6.11 percent. In 2020, the city's registered population was 1,678,367, accounting for 53.11 percent of the province's total population.Compared with the Sixth national census in 2010, the city's registered population increased by 401,052 people, the rural population decreased by 476,643 people, and the proportion of city's registered population increased by 13.64 percentage points.

There are 41 ethnic groups in Leshan City. Han, Yi, Hui and Miao live in the world. Han nationality is the main, followed by Yi nationality, ethnic minorities about 113,000 people, accounting for 3.2 percent of the total population. Yi Nationality: A major minority nationality concentrated in the south of Ma Bian, Ebian Yi Autonomous County, and Jinkouhe District.

== Geography and climate ==
Leshan City is located in central Sichuan Province, southwest of the Sichuan Basin. Meishan borders on the north, Zigong and Yibin in the east, Liangshan in the south, and Ya'an in the west. Leshan city is located in the transition zone from Sichuan basin to southwest mountainous area, the overall trend is high in southwest, low in northeast, with wide difference in height. Landforms are mountainous, hilly, Pingba three types, mainly mountainous.

Leshan has a monsoon-influenced humid subtropical climate (Köppen Cwa) and is largely mild and humid. Winter is short, mild and dry, with a January average of 7.4 °C (45.3 °F), and while frost may occur, snow is rare. Summers are long, hot and humid, with highs often exceeding 30 °C (86 °F), yet extended heat waves are rare. The daily average in July and August is around 26 °C (79 °F). Rainfall is light in winter and can be heavy in summer, and more than 70% of the annual total occurs from June to September.

The climate in the southwest mountainous area has obvious vertical differences and the climatic conditions are very complex, which is a region for the development of comprehensive agricultural management and three-dimensional agriculture in the region, the main production area of wood, tea, Chinese medicinal materials and other crops, and also a valuable tourism resource. Affected by the monsoon and the uplift of the terrain, the climate is humid and the rainfall is abundant.

Climate data for Leshan, elevation 424 m (1,391 ft), (1991–2020 normals, extremes 1971–present)
Month	Jan	Feb	Mar	Apr	May	Jun	Jul	Aug	Sep	Oct	Nov	Dec	Year
Record high °C (°F)	20.1 (68.2)	23.9 (75.0)	32.5 (90.5)	36.2 (97.2)	37.2 (99.0)	39.8 (103.6)	37.7 (99.9)	41.3 (106.3)	36.5 (97.7)	32.0 (89.6)	25.7 (78.3)	20.2 (68.4)	41.3 (106.3)
Mean daily maximum °C (°F)	10.3 (50.5)	13.3 (55.9)	18.3 (64.9)	23.8 (74.8)	27.3 (81.1)	29.2 (84.6)	31.3 (88.3)	31.0 (87.8)	26.5 (79.7)	21.4 (70.5)	17.0 (62.6)	11.6 (52.9)	21.8 (71.1)
Daily mean °C (°F)	7.4 (45.3)	9.8 (49.6)	14.0 (57.2)	18.9 (66.0)	22.4 (72.3)	24.6 (76.3)	26.6 (79.9)	26.3 (79.3)	22.6 (72.7)	18.2 (64.8)	13.9 (57.0)	8.9 (48.0)	17.8 (64.0)
Mean daily minimum °C (°F)	5.3 (41.5)	7.4 (45.3)	10.9 (51.6)	15.3 (59.5)	18.7 (65.7)	21.3 (70.3)	23.3 (73.9)	23.0 (73.4)	20.1 (68.2)	16.1 (61.0)	11.8 (53.2)	7.0 (44.6)	15.0 (59.0)
Record low °C (°F)	−1.7 (28.9)	−1.9 (28.6)	0.2 (32.4)	4.9 (40.8)	10.5 (50.9)	15.3 (59.5)	17.6 (63.7)	17.3 (63.1)	13.6 (56.5)	5.3 (41.5)	2.2 (36.0)	−2.9 (26.8)	−2.9 (26.8)
Average precipitation mm (inches)	14.4 (0.57)	21.9 (0.86)	42.5 (1.67)	85.2 (3.35)	104.8 (4.13)	146.1 (5.75)	256.2 (10.09)	295.8 (11.65)	132.2 (5.20)	59.9 (2.36)	29.6 (1.17)	13.7 (0.54)	1,202.3 (47.34)
Average precipitation days (≥ 0.1 mm)	9.7	10.2	12.9	14.3	14.5	16.4	15.5	15.0	15.9	16.4	9.6	9.1	159.5
Average snowy days	0.6	0.3	0	0	0	0	0	0	0	0	0	0.2	1.1
Average relative humidity (%)	80	77	73	72	71	77	79	79	82	84	81	82	78
Mean monthly sunshine hours	38.5	51.9	89.8	119.3	121.6	104.4	132.9	145.2	71.9	49.5	52.4	37.5	1,014.9
Percentage possible sunshine	12	16	24	31	29	25	31	36	20	14	17	12	22
Source 1: China Meteorological Administration all-time extreme temperature all-time January highall-time July high
Source 2: Weather China

== Natural resources ==
Leshan City, located at the confluence point of Minjiang River, Dadu River, Qing Yi River, is a water-rich area.

- Water resources: 85.51 billion cubic metres
- Theoretical reserves of hydraulic resources: 7.9 million kilowatts
- Developable capacity: 5.75 million kilowatts
- Main hydropower stations: Gongzui hydropower station (700,000 kW), Tongjiezi hydropower station (600,000 kW)

Apart from water resources, Leshan has rich mineral reserves of phosphorus, halite, limestone, kaolin, natural gas, gypsum, dolomite, mineral water and mirabilite.

== Gallery ==
Leshan

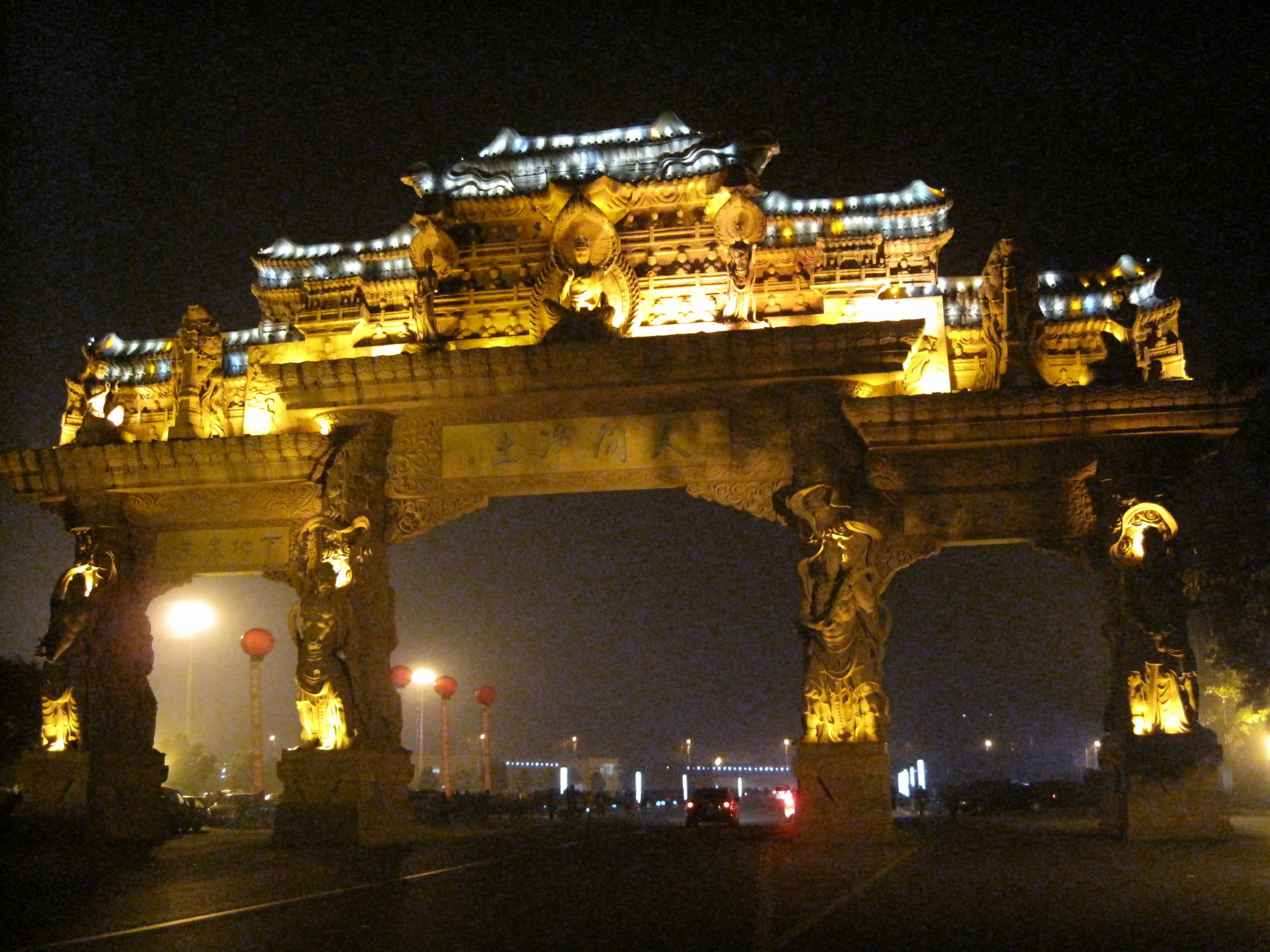
Night view

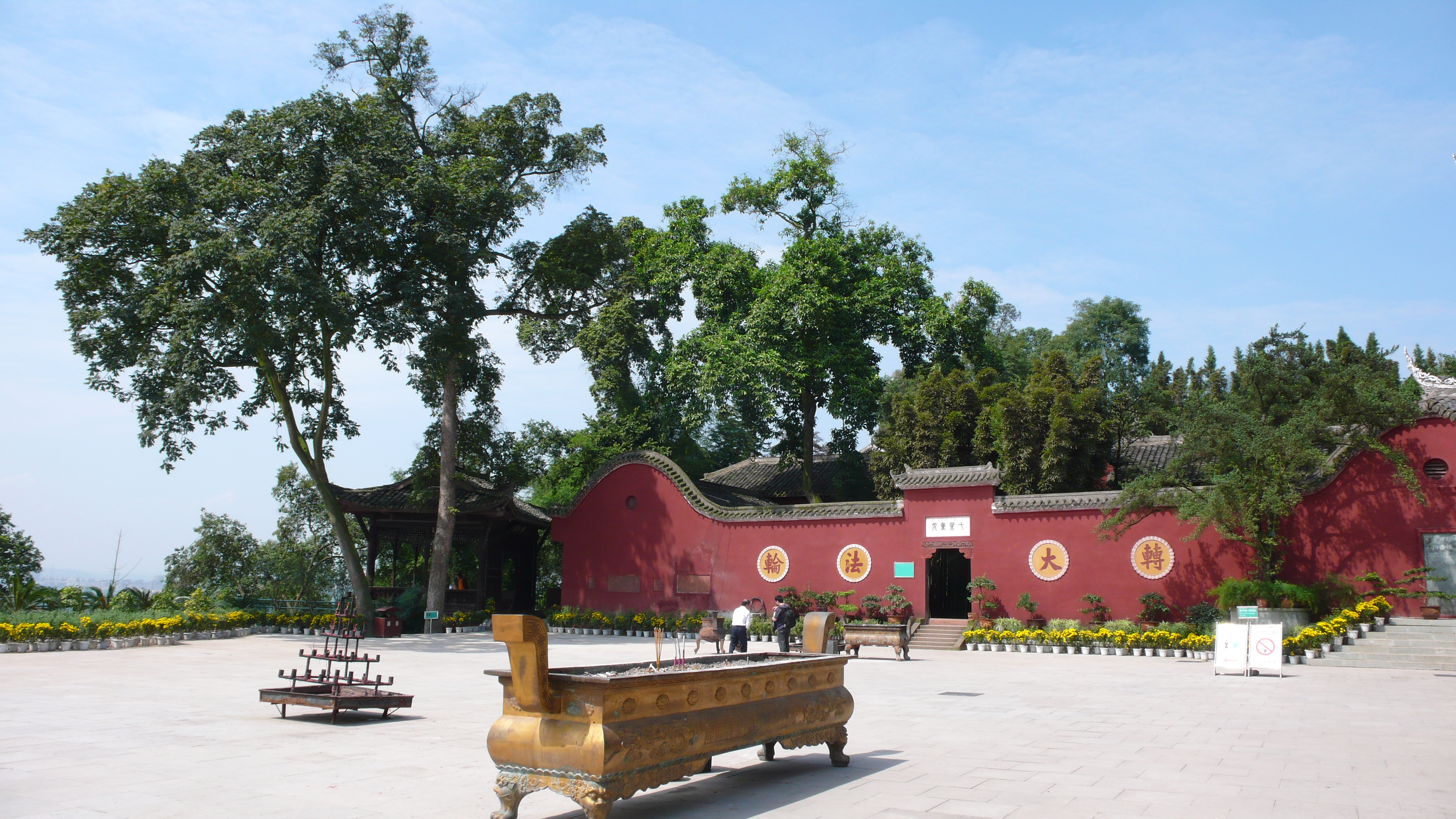
Buddhist temple

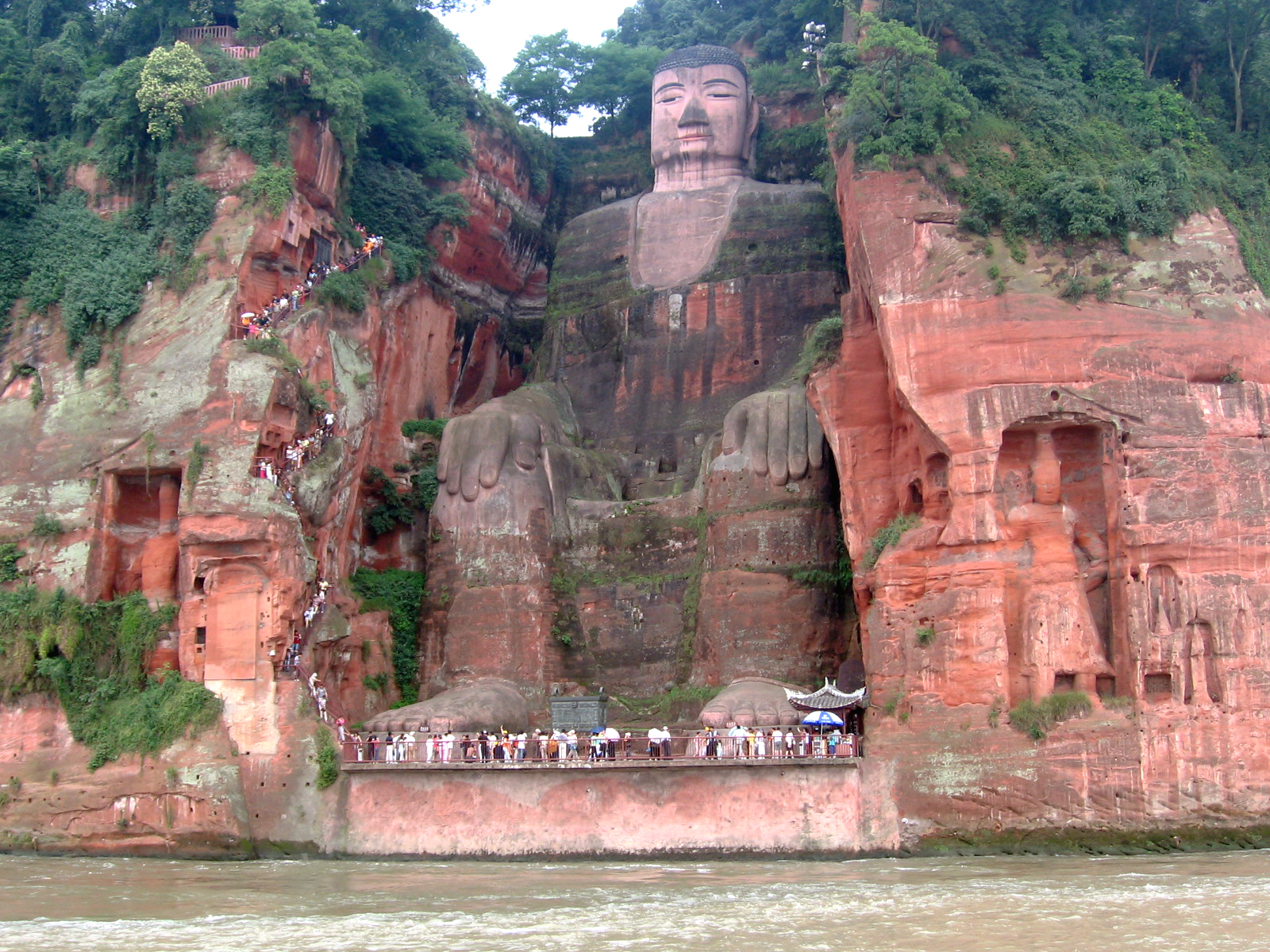
The Leshan Giant Buddha

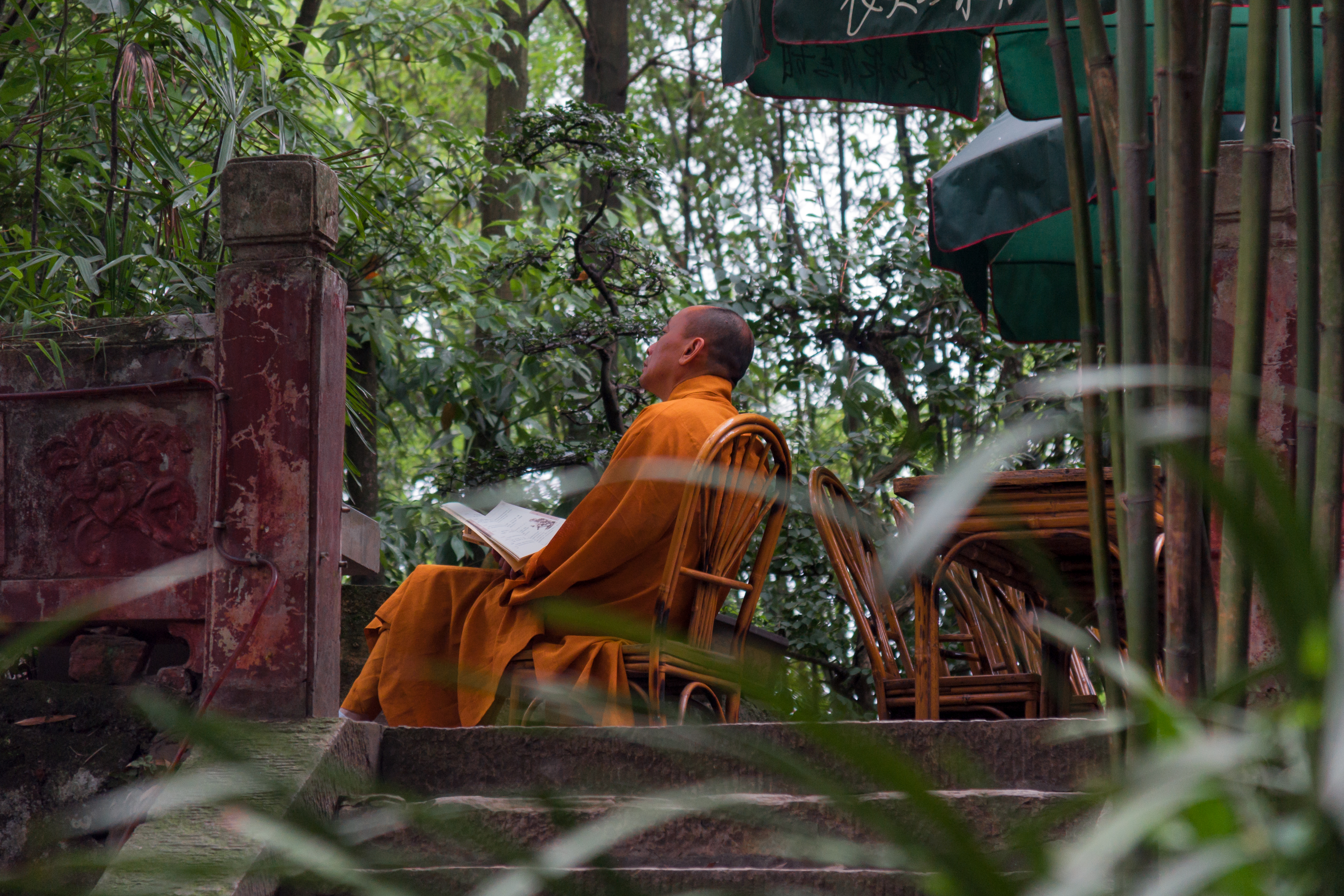
Buddhist Monk in Leshan

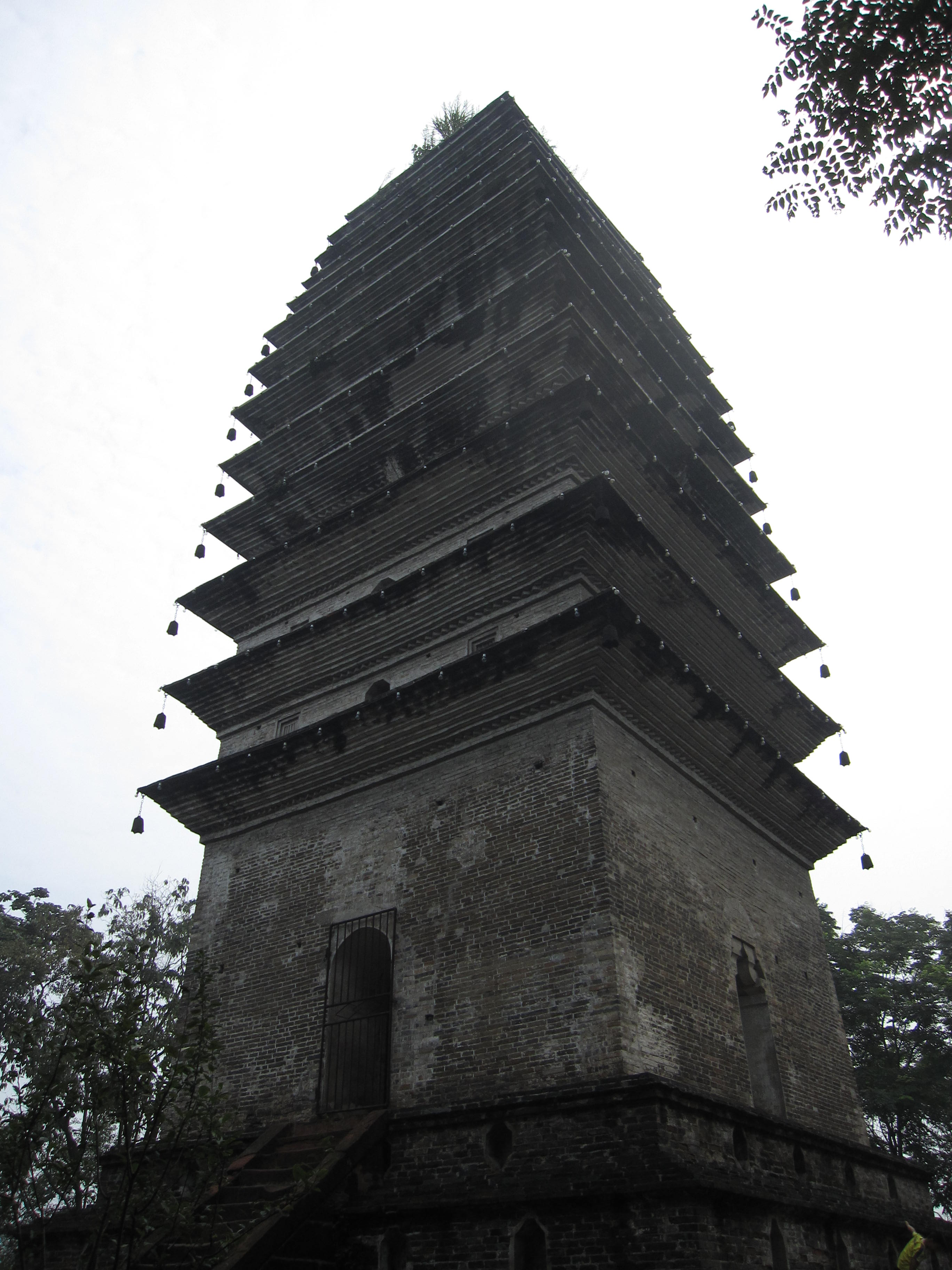
Lingbao Pagoda

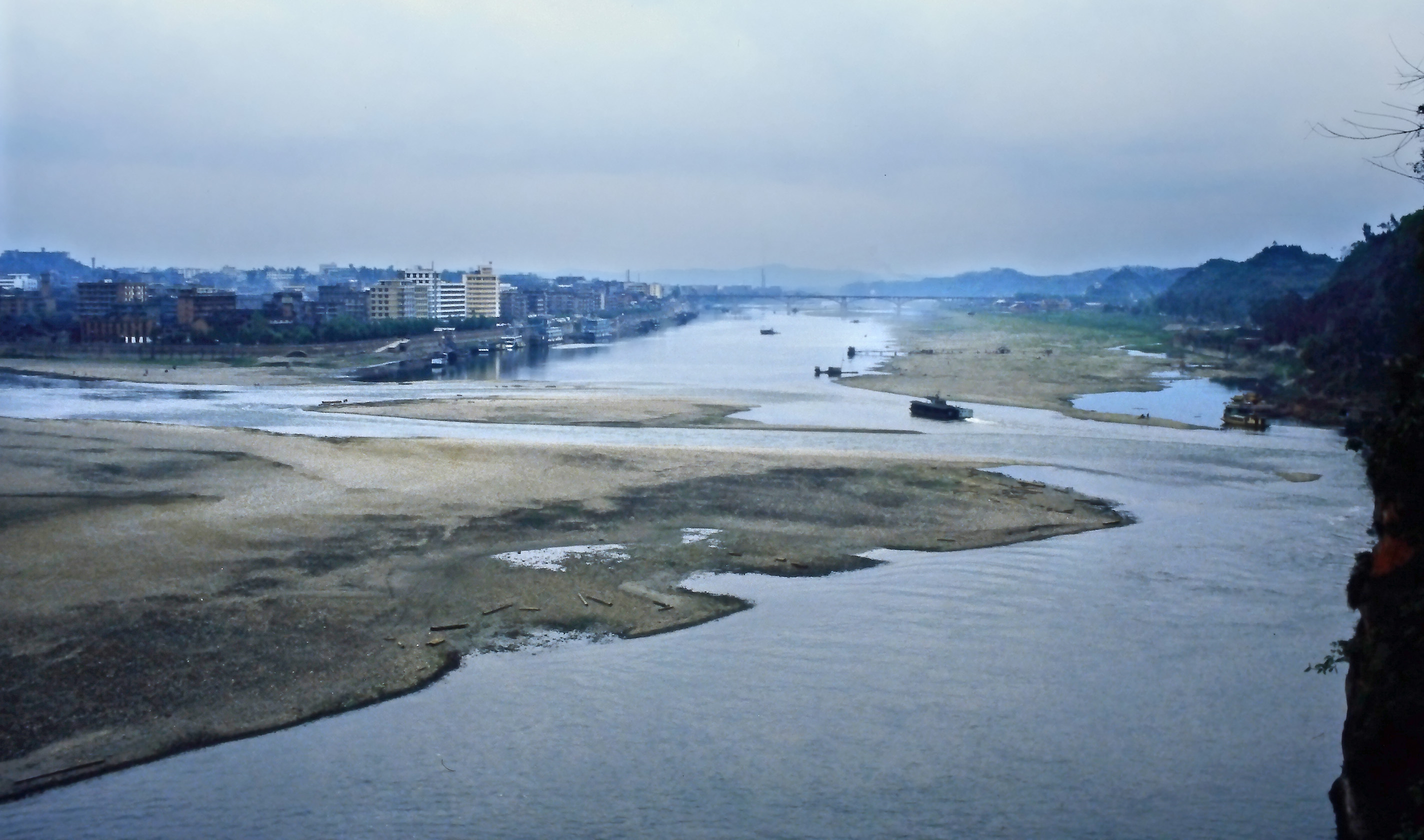
Leshan in 1988.

== Sister cities ==
- Hervey Bay, Queensland, Australia
- Gilbert, Arizona, United States
- Ichikawa, Chiba, Japan, established due to Leshan native Guo Moruo residing there for 10 years with his wife, Sato Tomiko.
- Prachuap Khiri Khan, Thailand
- Issy-les-Moulineaux, France

== Notable people ==
- Dylan Wang
- Guo Moruo
- Zheng Shaoxiong
- Cuttlefish That Loves Diving/Yuan Ye

== Famous place ==
- Leshan Buddha
- Reclining Buddha
- Mount Emei
- Mahaoya Tomb
- Thousand Buddha Rock in the Jiajiang River
- Ebian Black Bamboo Gou
- Luocheng Ancient Town
- Wutong Bridge

== See also ==
- 1786 Kangding-Luding earthquake
