= Hydroelectricity in China =

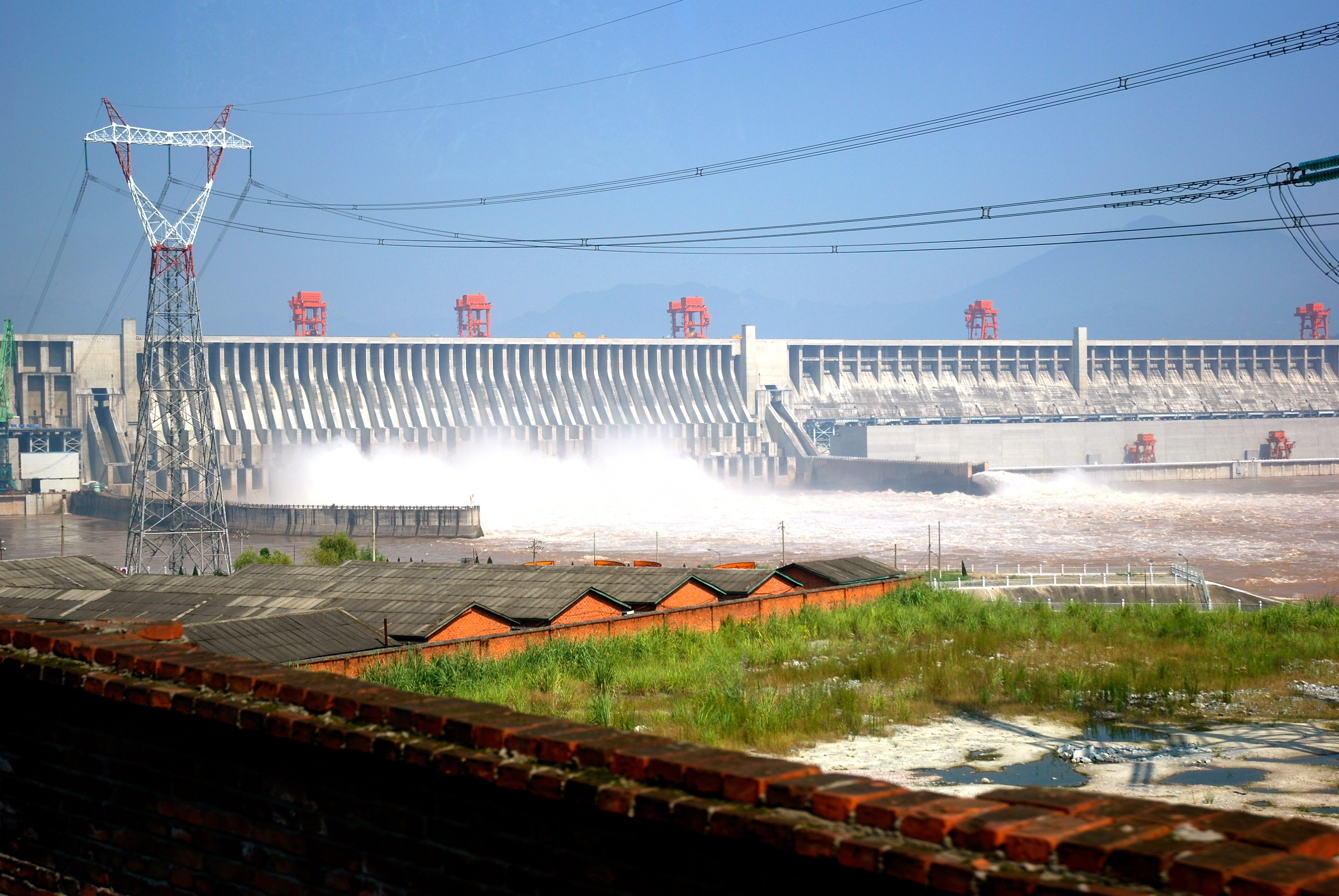
The Three Gorges Dam is the largest power station (of any kind) in the world by installed capacity, with 22.5 GW.

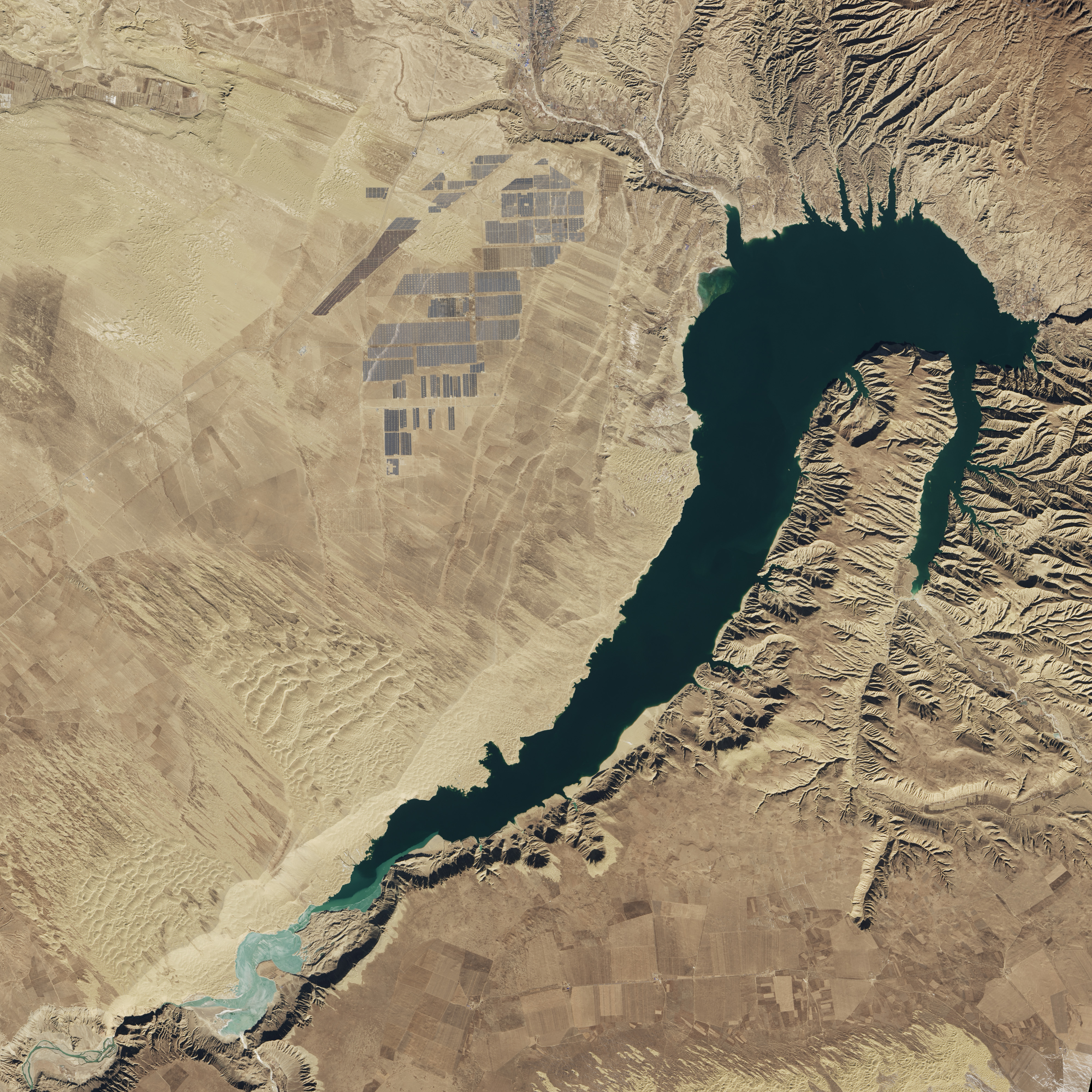
Satellite picture of the Longyangxia Dam reservoir and solar power park

Three Gorges Dam compared to all other Chinese hydroelectricity production

Hydroelectricity is currently China's largest renewable energy source and the second overall after coal. According to the International Hydropower Association, China is the worlds largest producer of hydroelectricity as of 2021. China's installed hydroelectric capacity in 2021 was 390.9 GW (including 36.4 GW of pumped storage hydroelectricity capacity) up from 233 GW in 2011. That year, hydropower generated 1,300 TWh of power, an increase of 68 TWh over 2018 when hydropower generated 1,232 TWh of power, accounting for roughly 18% of China's total electricity generation.

China's installed hydroelectric capacity in 2024 was 426 GW

Due to China's insufficient reserves of fossil fuels and the government's preference for energy independence, hydropower plays a big part in the energy policy of the country. There is therefore considerable potential for further hydro development.

As of 2015, hydroelectric plants in China had a relatively low productivity with an average capacity factor of 31%, due to seasonal variability of rainfall, rapid construction, and significant energy loss due to need for long transmission lines to connect remote dams in the mountainous south-west to demand in southern China.

Although hydroelectricity represents the largest renewable and low greenhouse gas emissions energy source in the country, the social and environmental impact of dam construction in China has been large, with millions of people forced to relocate and large scale damage to the environment.

== Largest hydroelectric plants ==
Name	Chinese name	River	Years of completion	Installed capacity (MW)	Annual production (TW-hour)	Area flooded (km^{2})	Location	Coordinates
Three Gorges		Yangtze	2008	22,500	98.8	1,084		
Baihetan Dam		Jinsha	2022	16,000	60.24			
Xiluodu		Jinsha	2014	13,860	55.2			
Wudongde Dam	乌东德水电站	Jinsha	2021	10,200				26°20′02″N 102°37′48″E
Xiangjiaba		Jinsha	2014	7,750	30.7	95.6		
Longtan		Hongshui	2007/2009	6,426	18.7			
Nuozhadu		Mekong	2014	5,850	23.9	320		
Jinping-II		Yalong	2014	4,800				
Laxiwa		Yellow	2010	4,200	10.2			
Xiaowan		Mekong	2010	4,200	19	190		
Fengning PS	丰宁抽水蓄能电站		2024	3,600				
Jinping-I		Yalong	2014	3,600	17	82.5		
Ertan Dam		Yalong	1999	3,300	17	101		
Pubugou Dam		Dadu	2009/2010	3,300	14.6			
Goupitan Dam		Wu	2009/2011	3,000	9.67	94		
Guanyinyan Dam		Jinsha	2014/2016	3,000	13.62			
Gezhouba Dam		Yangtze	1988	2,715	17.01			
Jinanqiao Dam		Jinsha	2010	2,400				
Liyuan Dam		Jinsha	2014/2015	2,400				
Guandi Dam		Yalong	2013	2,400				
Huanggou PS	荒沟抽水蓄能电站		2022	1,200				
Hohhot PS	呼和浩特抽水蓄能电站		2014	1,200				
Panlong PS	蟠龙抽水蓄能电站		2024	1,200				
Shenzhen PS	深圳抽水蓄能电站		2017	1,200				
Tianchi PS	天池抽水蓄能电站		2023	1,200				

=== Under construction ===
Name	Chinese name	River	Expected completion	Expected capacity (MW)	Expected production (TW-hour)	Area flooded (km^{2})	Location	Coordinates
Medog Dam	墨脱水电站	Yarlung Tsangpo		60,000	300			29°27′37″N 95°21′48″E
Hongping PS	洪屏抽水蓄能电站			2,400				
Wendeng PS	文登抽水蓄能电站			1,800				

== History ==
The Shilongba Hydropower Station is the first hydroelectric power plant in China. It was built in Yunnan province in 1912, with a capacity of 240 kW. Due to the subsequent period of political and social instability, little additional progress was made in power infrastructure in the country at that time. The total installed capacity before the Japanese occupation was only about 10 MW. During the Japanese occupation several large scale hydroelectric projects were built, and total capacity reached 900 MW. Energy infrastructure however suffered heavy damage during the second World War, and the operational capacity after the war was only about 580 MW.

After the Chinese Communist Revolution of 1949, a program of dam construction was initiated. However, most of these dams were built for irrigation and not intended to produce electricity. Moreover, construction was carried out mostly by unskilled peasants. During this period, the steady supply of cheap domestic coal hindered the development of hydroelectricity. Installed hydroelectric capacity grew somewhat after the 1960s, with plants of growing size and complexity, reaching a total of 20 GW in 1980.

As of 2020, China had more than 150 dams with a generating capacity of at least 300 megawatts and total installed capacity of 369 gigawatts.

As of 2021, China operates four of the world's six largest dams. These include the world's biggest (Three Gorges Dam, with 22.5 gigawatts capacity) and second biggest (Baihetan Dam).

After completion of the Baihetan Dam in 2021, all planned large scale dams had been completed.

As of May 2023, China had an operational pumped-storage capacity of 50 gigawatts (GW), accounting for 30% of the global total. This capacity is projected to expand significantly, with 89 GW currently under construction. Additionally, developers are in the process of securing approvals, land rights, and financing for a further 276 GW, according to Global Energy Monitor.

As of 2024, China's total installed capacity is 426 GW.

In August 2024, China completed the Fengning Pumped Storage Power Station in Hebei province, now the world's largest pumped hydro facility with an installed capacity of 3.6 gigawatts (GW). Operated by the State Grid Corporation of China, the project began construction in June 2013 and was finalized on 11 August, 2024, upon the activation of its twelfth and final turbine unit.

In December 2024, Reuters reported that China had approved the construction of a hydropower dam on the lower Yarlung Zangbo River in Tibet, expected to be the world’s largest in terms of electricity generation capacity. The dam is projected to generate 300 billion kilowatt-hours (kWh) annually, more than three times the output of the Three Gorges Dam.

== Environmental and human impact ==
Hydropower is considered a renewable and clean energy source. However large dams, such as the Three Gorges Dam or the Xiluodu Dam have had human and environmental impacts on the areas surrounding dam reservoirs, including erosion, flooding of farmland and destruction of fish breeding habitats. Then Prime Minister Wen Jiabao noted in a report to the National People's Congress in 2007 that dam building in China had displaced 23 million people over the years.

== See also ==
- Renewable energy in China
  - Solar power in China
  - Wind power in China
  - Geothermal power in China
  - Bioenergy in China
- Renewable energy by country
- Electricity sector in China
