= Jinping (disambiguation) =

Xi Jinping (Chinese: 习近平) is the leader of the People's Republic of China since 2012.

Jinping may also refer to:

== Locations in the People's Republic of China ==
=== Inhabited places (锦屏镇) ===
- Jinping, Chongxin County, in Chongxin County, Gansu
- Jinping, Jingdong County, in Jingdong Yi Autonomous County, Yunnan
- Jinping, Lianyungang, in Haizhou District, Lianyungang, Jiangsu
- Jinping, Qiubei County, in Qiubei County, Yunnan
- Jinping, Yiyang County, Henan, in Yiyang County, Henan
- Jinping County, Guizhou (锦屏县), of Qiandongnan Prefecture, Guizhou
- Jinping District (金平区), Shantou, Guangdong
- Jinping Miao, Yao, and Dai Autonomous County (金平苗族瑶族傣族自治县), of Honghe Prefecture, Yunnan

=== Other locations ===
- Jinping Mountains (锦屏山), in Sichuan
- Jinping-I Dam, on the Yalong River in Sichuan
- Jinping-II Dam, on the Yalong River in Sichuan
- Jinping Road Station (金平路站), a station on the Shanghai Metro
- Kam Ping (constituency) (Jinping in Mandarin)

== See also ==
- Jingping (disambiguation)
