= Jinping Hydropower Station =

Jinping Hydropower Station may refer to:

- Jinping 1 Hydropower Station, in China
- Jinping 2 Hydropower Station, in China
