= PandaX =

Dark matter detection experiment

- Alternative names: Particle and Astrophysical Xenon Detector
- Location(s): Sichuan, PRC
- Coordinates: 28°12′N 101°42′E
- Website: pandax.sjtu.edu.cn
- Location within China

The Particle and Astrophysical Xenon Detector, or PandaX, is a dark matter detection experiment at China Jinping Underground Laboratory (CJPL) in Sichuan, China. The experiment occupies the deepest underground laboratory in the world, and is among the largest of its kind.

== Participants ==
The experiment is run by an international team of about 40 scientists, led by researchers at China's Shanghai Jiao Tong University. The project began in 2009 with researchers from Shanghai Jiao Tong University, Shandong University, the Shanghai Institute of Applied Physics (zh), and the Chinese Academy of Sciences. Researchers from the University of Maryland, Peking University, and the University of Michigan joined two years later. The PandaX team also includes members from the Ertan Hydropower Development Company. Scientists from University of Science and Technology of China, China Institute of Atomic Energy and Sun Yat-Sen University joined PandaX in 2015.

== Design and construction ==
PandaX is a direct-detection experiment, consisting of a dual-phase xenon time projection chamber (TPC) detector. The use of both liquid and gaseous phases of xenon, similarly to the XENON and LUX experiments, allows the location of events to be determined, and gamma ray events to be vetoed. In addition to searching for dark matter events, PandaX is designed to detect Xe-136 neutrinoless double beta decay.

=== Laboratory ===
PandaX is located at China Jinping Underground Laboratory (CJPL), the deepest underground laboratory in the world at more than 2,400 metres (1.5 mi) below ground. The depth of the laboratory means the experiment is better shielded from cosmic ray interference than similar detectors, allowing the instrument to be scaled up more easily. The muon flux at CJPL is 66 events per square meter per year, compared with 950 events/m^{2}/year at the Sanford Underground Research Facility, home of the LUX experiment, and 8,030 events/m^{2}/year at the Gran Sasso lab in Italy, home to the XENON detector. The marble at Jinping is also less radioactive than the rock at Homestake and Gran Sasso, further reducing the frequency of false detections. Wolfgang Lorenzon, a collaborating researcher from the University of Michigan, has commented that "the big advantage is that PandaX is much cheaper and doesn't need as much shielding material" as similar detectors.

=== Operational stages ===
Like most low-background physics, the experiment is constructing multiple generations of detectors, each serving as a prototype for the next. A larger size allows greater sensitivity, but this is only useful if unwanted "background events" can be kept from swamping the desired ones; ever more stringent limits on radioactive contamination are also required. Lessons learned in earlier generations are used to construct later ones.

The first generation, PandaX-I, operated until late November, 2014. It used 120 kg (260 lb) of xenon (of which 54 kg (119 lb) served as a fiducial mass) to probe the low-mass regime (<10 GeV) and verify dark matter signals reported by other detector experiments. PandaX-I was the first dark matter experiment in China to use more than 100 kg of xenon in its detector, and its size was second only to the LUX experiment in the United States.

PandaX-II, completed in March 2015 and currently operational, uses 500 kilograms (1,100 lb) of xenon (approximately 300 kg fiducual) to probe the 10–1,000 GeV regime. PandaX-II reuses the shield, outer vessel, cryogenics, purification hardware, and general infrastructure from the first version, but uses a much larger time projection chamber, an inner vessel of higher purity (much less radioactive ^{60}Co) stainless steel, and a cryostat.

The construction cost of PandaX is estimated at US$15 million, with an initial cost of $8 million for the first stage.

PandaX-II produced some preliminary physics results from a brief commissioning run in late 2015 (November 21 to December 14) before the main physics run through 2018.

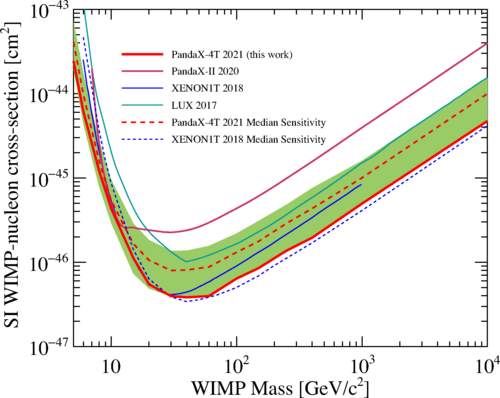
Upper limits for WIMP-nucleon elastic cross sections from selected experiments as reported by PandaX in 2021 (±1σ sensitivity band in green).

PandaX-II is significantly more sensitive than both the 100-kg XENON100 and 250-kg LUX detectors. XENON100, in Italy has, in the three to four years prior to 2014, produced the highest sensitivities over a wide range of WIMP masses, but was leapfrogged by PandaX-II. The most recent results on the spin-independent WIMP-nucleon scattering cross-section of PandaX-II were published in 2017. In September 2018 the XENON1T experiment published its results from 278.8 days of collected data and set a new record limit for WIMP-nucleon spin-independent elastic interactions.

The next stages of PandaX are called PandaX-xT. An intermediate stage with a four-ton target (PandaX-4T) is under construction in the second-phase CJPL-II laboratory. The ultimate goal is to build a third generation dark matter detector, which will contain thirty tons of xenon in the sensitive region. In July 2021, a publication was made, searching for dark matter using results from the PandaX-4T commissioning run.

== Initial results ==
The majority of the PandaX experimental equipment was transported from Shanghai Jiao Tong University to China Jinping Underground Laboratory in August 2012, and two engineering test runs were conducted in 2013. The initial data-collection run (PandaX-I) began in May 2014. Results from this run were reported in September 2014 in the journal Science China Physics, Mechanics & Astronomy. In the initial run, about 4 million raw events were recorded, with around 10,000 in the expected energy region for WIMP dark matter. Of these, only 46 events were recorded in the quiet inner core of the xenon target. These events were consistent with background radiation, rather than dark matter. The lack of an observed dark-matter signal in the PandaX-I run places strong constraints on previously-reported dark matter signals from similar experiments.

== Reception ==
Stefan Funk of the SLAC National Accelerator Laboratory has questioned the wisdom of having many separate direct-detection dark matter experiments in different countries, commenting that "spending all our money on different direct-detection experiments is not worth it." Xiangdong Ji, spokesperson for PandaX and a physicist at Shanghai Jiao Tong University, concedes that the international community is unlikely to support more than two multi-tonne detectors, but argues that having many groups working will lead to faster improvement in detection technology. Richard Gaitskell, a spokesperson for the LUX experiment and a physics professor at Brown University, commented, "I'm excited about seeing China developing a fundamental physics program."
