= CDEX =

CDEX may refer to:

- CDex, an open source application to rip CDs and convert music files
- The China Dark Matter Experiment
- CD-ROM Extension, an API extension to the DOS redirector interface as used by Microsoft's MSCDEX and similar drivers
- Check Stub Data Exchange, a standard format (API PUBL 3805) published by the American Petroleum Institute
