= Lianghekou Dam =

- Location within China
- Country: China
- Location: Yajiang County, Sichuan Province, China
- Coordinates: 30°11′49″N 101°00′38.98″E
- Status: Complete
- Construction began: 2009
- Opening date: 2021
- Owners: Ertan Hydropower Development Company, Ltd

Dam and spillways
- Type of dam: Embankment, clay-core rock-fill
- Impounds: Yalong River
- Height: 295 m (968 ft)
- Length: 650 m (2,133 ft)

Reservoir
- Creates: Lianghekou Reservoir
- Total capacity: 10,767,000,000 m^{3} (8,728,949 acre⋅ft)
- Catchment area: 65,200 km^{2} (25,174 sq mi)

Power Station
- Commission date: 18 March 2022
- Turbines: 6 x 500 MW Francis-type
- Installed capacity: 3,000 MW

The Lianghekou Dam (meaning: "mouth of two rivers") is a clay-core rockfill embankment dam currently in operation on the Yalong River, a tributary of Yangtze River, in Yajiang County, Sichuan Province, China. The dam is located at the confluence of the Yalong, Xianshui, and Qingda Rivers. The 295-metre-tall (968 ft) dam is the highest embankment dam in the country and supports a 3,000 MW power station. Studies for the dam were completed between 2005 and 2009, with preliminary construction beginning that year. Major works on the dam officially began in October 2014. The first two generators were commissioned in September 2021, and the final unit was put in service in March 2022. With the reservoir's relatively large active capacity with respect to the river's annual flow, it can regulate the river flow across multiple years and increase the downstream hydroelectric power stations' output by smoothing out river flow peaks and troughs.

A pumped-storage hydroelectric plant of 1200 MW is under construction, taking advantage of the large reservoir size.

Over 4,900 people were relocated during the construction of the dam.

There are several solar and wind projects that are in operation (1,000 MW) or under construction (2,200 MW) near the dam, taking advantage of the dam's existing power transmission system and the ability to regulate the hydroelectric power output to compensate the variable wind and solar output.

== See also ==
- List of power stations in China
