= Bosihe, Sichuan =

Bosihe 波斯河镇
- Town
- Bosihezhen
- Location in Sichuan
- Coordinates: 29°23′45″N 101°4′40″E
- Country: People's Republic of China
- Province: Sichuan
- Autonomous prefecture: Garzê Tibetan Autonomous Prefecture
- County: Yajiang County

Area
  - Total: 1,162 km^{2} (449 sq mi)

Population (2010)
  - Total: 1,162
  - Density: 1.000/km^{2} (2.590/sq mi)
- Time zone: UTC+8 (China Standard)

Bosihe (Mandarin: 波斯河镇) is a town in Yajiang County, Garzê Tibetan Autonomous Prefecture, Sichuan, China. In 2010, Bosihe had a total population of 1,162: 605 males and 557 females: 259 aged under 14, 795 aged between 15 and 65 and 108 aged over 65.
