= China Jinping Underground Laboratory =

Underground research facility in China

- 中国锦屏地下实验室
- Established: December 12, 2010
- Field of research: Dark matter physics
- Director: Cheng Jianping
- Faculty: Zeng Zhi; Ma Hao; Li Jianming; Wu Qifan
- Location: Mianning County, Sichuan, China; 28.15323°N 101.7114°E
- Owner: Yalong River Hydropower Development Company
- Operating agency: Tsinghua University
- Website: jinping.hep.tsinghua.edu.cn

The China Jinping Underground Laboratory (Chinese: 中国锦屏地下实验室; pinyin: Zhōngguó jǐn píng dìxià shíyàn shì) is a deep underground laboratory in the Jinping Mountains of Sichuan, China. The cosmic ray rate in the laboratory is under 0.2 muons/m^{2}/day, placing the lab at a depth of 6720 m.w.e. and making it the best-shielded underground laboratory in the world. The actual depth of the laboratory is 2,400 m (7,900 ft), yet there is horizontal access so equipment may be brought in by truck.

Although the marble through which the tunnels are dug is considered "hard rock", at the great depth it presents greater geotechnical engineering challenges than the even harder igneous rocks in which other deep laboratories are constructed. The 10 MPa (1500 psi; 99 atm) water pressure in the rock is also inconvenient. But marble has the advantage for radiation shielding of being low in radionuclides, such as ^{40}K, ^{226}Ra, ^{232}Th, and ^{238}U. This in turn leads to low levels of radon (^{222}Rn) in the atmosphere.

The laboratory is in Liangshan in southern Sichuan, about 500 km (310 mi) southwest of Chengdu. The closest major airport is Xichang Qingshan Airport, 120 km (75 mi) away by road.

== History ==
The Jinping-II Dam hydroelectric power project involved excavating a number of large tunnels under the Jinping Mountains: four large 16.7 km (10.4 mi) headrace tunnels carrying water east, two 17.5 km (10.9 mi) vehicular access tunnels, and one water drainage tunnel. Hearing of the excavation in August 2008, physicists at Tsinghua University determined that it would be an excellent location for a deep underground laboratory, and negotiated with the hydropower company to excavate laboratory space in the middle of the tunnels.

A formal agreement was signed on 8 May 2009, and excavation was promptly started. The first phase CJPL-I, consisting of a 6.5 × 6.5 × 42 m (21 × 21 × 138 ft) main hall, plus 55 m (180 ft) of access tunnel (4,000 m^{3} total excavation) was excavated by May 2010, and construction completed 12 June 2010. A formal laboratory inauguration was held 12 December 2010.

The laboratory is to the south of the southernmost of the seven parallel tunnels, traffic tunnel A.

The air ventilation in CJPL-I was initially inadequate, resulting in the accumulation of dust on the equipment and radon gas in the air until additional ventilation was installed.

A more difficult problem is that the walls of CJPL-I were lined with ordinary concrete taken from the hydroelectric project's supply. This has a natural radioactivity higher than desirable for a low-background laboratory. The second phase of construction uses materials selected for low radioactivity.

== CJPL-II expansion ==
The laboratory is currently undergoing a major (50-fold) expansion. The first phase was rapidly filled, and plans for a second were made quickly, before the excavation workers and equipment departed following completion of the hydroelectric project in 2014.

Slightly west of CJPL-I, two bypass tunnels totalling roughly 1 km (3,300 ft) long are left over from constructing the seven tunnels of the hydropower project. They are sloped criss-crossing tunnels which connect the midpoints of the five water tunnels (four headrace and one drainage) to the road tunnels beside and slightly above them. Totalling 210,000 m^{3} (7.4×10^{6} ft^{3}), and originally intended to be blocked off after construction, they have been donated to the laboratory and will be used for support facilities.

The expansion has added 151,000 m^{3} (5.3×10^{6} ft^{3}), of additional excavation: some interconnecting access tunnels, four large experimental halls, each 14×14×130 m (46×46×427 ft), and two pits for shielding tanks below the halls' floors. The China Dark Matter Experiment has a cylindrical pit, 18 m (59 ft) deep and in diameter, (Note: Earlier plans were for 16 m wide and deep, but this was enlarged to 18 m.) which will be filled with a liquid nitrogen tank, and PandaX has an elliptical pit (Note: It's not totally clear if the pit is elliptical (with an area of 27×16×π/4 = 339.3 m^{2}) or a stadium-shaped oval (with an area of 11×16 + 16^{2}×π/4 = 377.1 m^{2}). The difference is a volume of 4750 m^{3} vs. 5279 m^{3}.) for a water shielding tank, 27×16 m (89×52 ft) and 14 m (46 ft) deep. The halls were complete by the end of 2015,, the pits by May 2016, and as of May 2017 are being fitted with ventilation systems and other necessities. (This is somewhat behind expectations that they would be ready for occupation in January 2017.)

When complete, it will be the world's largest underground laboratory, surpassing the current record-holder, the Laboratori Nazionali del Gran Sasso (LNGS). Although greater depth and weaker rock force the halls to be narrower than the 20 m (66 ft) wide main halls of LNGS, their combined length of 520 m (1,710 ft) provides more floor space (7,280 vs. 6,000 m^{2}) than LNGS's three halls totalling 300 metres (980 ft).

CJPL's halls also enclose more volume than those of LNGS. CJPL has 93,300 m^{3} (Note: The cross-section drawings of CJPL's halls are inconsistent. A vaulted roof 14 m wide with 4.08 m sagitta spans an angle of 121°; the smaller 114° angle shown would imply a larger radius and smaller sagitta of 3.8 m. These lead to cross-sectional areas of 179.434 and 180.275 m^{2}, respectively, and lab volumes of 93,306 and 93,743 m^{2}, respectively.) in the halls proper, and an additional 9,300 m^{3} in the shielding pits making a total of 102,600 m^{3}, slightly more than LNGS's 95,100 m^{3}. (Note: LNGS's main halls are assumed to be 20 m wide, with a hemispherical roof peaking at 18 m. Thus, the cross-sectional area is 20×(8+10×π/4) = 317.08 m^{2}.)

Including the service areas outside the main halls, the result is 200,000–300,000 m^{3} of usable space, more than LNGS's grand total of 180,000 m^{3}. CJPL's total volume of 361,000 m^{3} would suggest that CJPL is twice the size, but that would be misleading; all of LNGS's excavation was designed to be a laboratory, and thus can be used more efficiently than CJPL's repurposed tunnels.

CJPL facility resources
	CJPL-I	CJPL-II
Overall volume	4,000 m^{3} 140,000 ft^{3}	210,000 + 151,000 m^{3} 7.4×10^{6} + 5.3×10^{6} ft^{3}
Laboratory area	273 m^{2} 2,940 ft^{2}	7,280 m^{2} 78,400 ft^{2}
Laboratory volume	1,800 m^{3} 64,000 ft^{3}	102,600 m^{3} 3.62×10^{6} ft^{3}
Electrical power	70 kVA	1250 (10000) kVA
Fresh air	2,400 m^{3}/h85,000 ft^{3}/h	24,000 m^{3}/h0.85×10^{6} ft^{3}/h

Thanks to the laboratory's location within a major hydroelectric facility, additional electrical power is readily available. CJPL-II is supplied by two redundant 10 kV, 10 MVA power cables; available power is temporarily limited by the 5×250 kVA step-down transformers in the laboratory (one per experiment hall, and a fifth for facilities). There is likewise no shortage of water for cooling high-powered equipment.

The muon flux in (and thus water equivalent depth of) CJPL-II is currently being measured, and may differ slightly from CJPL-I, but it will certainly remain lower than SNOLAB in Canada and thus retain the record for the world's deepest laboratory as well.

== Experiments ==
Experiments currently operating in CJPL are:

- China Dark Matter Experiment (CDEX), a germanium dark matter detector,
- PandaX, the Particle and Astrophysical Xenon Detector for dark matter (and neutrinoless double beta decay), and
- A 1-ton prototype of the planned 100-ton Jinping Neutrino Experiment, an experiment taking advantage of CJPL's location far from nuclear reactors, and thus having the lowest flux of reactor neutrinos of any underground laboratory, to do precision measurements of solar- and geoneutrinos.

Also operating in the laboratory is a low background facility using a high purity germanium detector, for measuring very low levels of radioactivity. This is not a physics experiment itself, but tests materials intended for use in the experiments. It also tests materials used to construct CJPL-II.

Experiments currently planned for CJPL-II are:

- a larger, tonne-scale version of CDEX,
- a larger, tonne-scale version of PandaX,
- Jinping Underground Nuclear Astrophysics (JUNA), an experiment to measure the rates of astrophysically important stellar nuclear reactions, and
- a possible liquid argon dark matter detector.

Proposals also exist for:

- CUPID (CUORE Upgrade with Particle Identification), a neutrinoless double beta decay experiment, and
- a directional dark matter detector by the MIMAC (MIcro-tpc MAtrix of Chambers) collaboration, as a follow-on to their detector currently operating at the Modane Underground Laboratory.

== See also ==
- Sanford Underground Research Facility
- Yemilab
- Kamioka Observatory
