= Jingping =

Jingping may refer to:

- Jing ping, a style of music from Dominica
- Jingping Expressway
- Jingping metro station
- E Jingping
- Wang Jingping
- Duanmu Hongliang, born Cao Jingping
- A character in the Australian television series Pizza

== See also ==
- Jinping (disambiguation)
