= Hekou, Yajiang County =

Hekou, Sichuan
- Town

Tibetan transcription(s)

Chinese transcription(s)
- Interactive map of Hekou, Sichuan
- Country: China
- Province: Sichuan
- Prefecture: Garzê Tibetan Autonomous Prefecture
- Time zone: UTC+8 (CST)

Hekou (Chinese: 河口镇; pinyin: Hékǒu Zhèn; Tibetan: ཆུ་ཁ་གྲོང་རྡལ།, Wylie: chu kha grong rdal) is a town in Yajiang County, Garzê Tibetan Autonomous Prefecture of Sichuan, China.
