= Zhusang Township, Sichuan =

Zhusang Township 祝桑乡
- Township
- Zhusangxiang
- Location in Sichuan
- Coordinates: 29°52′21″N 101°19′36″E
- Country: People's Republic of China
- Province: Sichuan
- Autonomous prefecture: Garzê Tibetan Autonomous Prefecture
- County: Yajiang County

Area
  - Total: 413.4 km^{2} (159.6 sq mi)

Population (2010)
  - Total: 3,383
  - Density: 8.183/km^{2} (21.19/sq mi)
- Time zone: UTC+8 (China Standard)

Zhusang (Mandarin: 祝桑乡) is a township in Yajiang County, Garzê Tibetan Autonomous Prefecture, Sichuan, China. In 2010, Zhusang Township had a total population of 3,383: 1,768 males and 1,615 females: 806 aged under 14, 2,362 aged between 15 and 65 and 215 aged over 65.
