= Guandi Dam =

Dam in Sichuan, China

- Location within China
- Location: Sichuan Province
- Coordinates: 27°49′17″N 101°53′10″E
- Status: Operational
- Construction began: 2010
- Opening date: 2012
- Owner: Ertan Hydropower Development Company

Dam and spillways
- Type of dam: Gravity, roller-compacted concrete
- Impounds: Yalong River
- Height: 168 metres (551 ft)
- Elevation at crest: 1,334 metres (4,377 ft)

Reservoir
- Creates: Guandi Reservoir
- Total capacity: 760,000,000 cubic metres (616,142 acre⋅ft)
- Normal elevation: 1,330 metres (4,364 ft)

Power Station
- Commission date: 2012-2013
- Turbines: 4 x 600 MW
- Installed capacity: 2,400 MW

The Guandi Dam (simplified Chinese: 官地大坝; traditional Chinese: 官地大壩; pinyin: Guāndì Dàbà) is a gravity dam on the Yalong River, a tributary of the Yangtze River in Sichuan Province Southwest of China. It supplies water to four hydroelectric generators, each with generating capacity of 600 MW. The total generating capacity of the project is 2,400 MW. Construction started on October 20, 2010, with a ground-breaking ceremony. On February 9, 2012, the dam began to impound the reservoir and the last of the four generators were commissioned on 28 March 2013.

== See also ==
- List of power stations in China
