= Yanyuan County =

Yanyuan County 盐源县 · ꑸꑼꑤ
- County
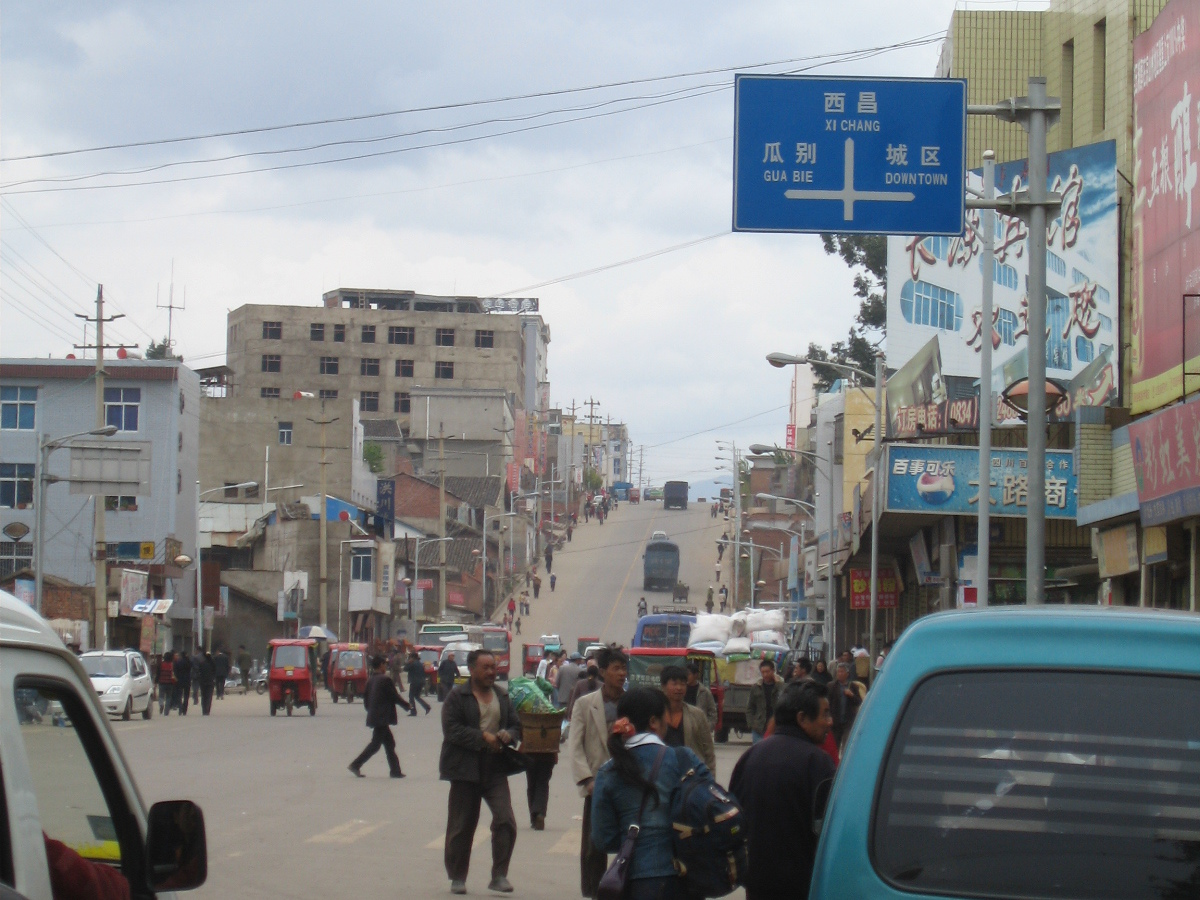
- Yanjing, the seat of Yanyuan

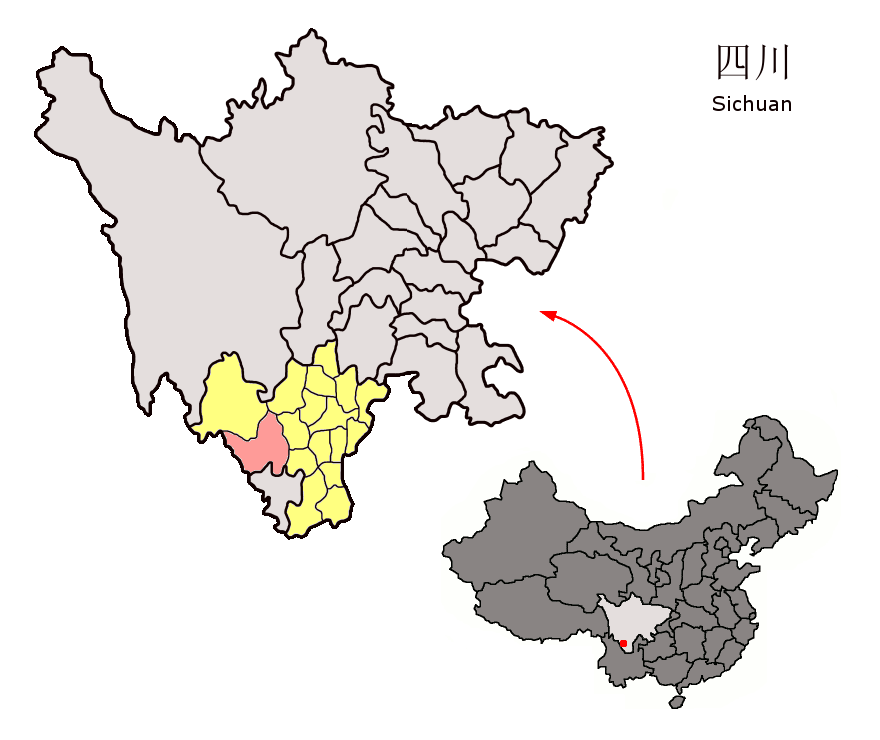
- Location of Yanyuan County (red) within Liangshan Prefecture (yellow) and Sichuan

- Location in Sichuan Yanyuan (China)
- Country: China
- Province: Sichuan
- Prefecture-level city: Liangshan
- County seat: Yanjing Subdistrict

Area
  - Total: 8,388 km^{2} (3,239 sq mi)

Population (2020)
  - Total: 340,898
  - Density: 40.64/km^{2} (105.3/sq mi)
- Time zone: UTC+8 (China Standard)
- Website: www.yanyuan.gov.cn

Yanyuan County

Chinese name
- Simplified Chinese: 盐源县
- Traditional Chinese: 鹽源縣
Transcriptions
Standard Mandarin
- Hanyu Pinyin: Yányuán Xiàn

Yi name
- Yi: ꋂꂿꑤ; Romanisation: ce mo xiep

Yanyuan County (Chinese: 盐源县; pinyin: Yányuán Xiàn; Yi: ꑸꑼꑤ yiep yuop xiep, also ꋂꂿꑤ ce mo xiep) is a county in Liangshan Prefecture, Sichuan Province, China, bordering Yunnan province to the west. The county is located in Sichuan's rugged Hengduan Mountains in southwest Sichuan, but the county seat of Yanjing (盐井) is situated in an unusually flat basin with a 30 km (19 mi) diameter. Yanjing, as the county seat, is usually referred to as Yanyuan.

== History ==
Yanyuan County was originally inhabited by the Yi people, but has since been incorporated into Han Chinese culture. The region has long been a source of salt for the Chinese and the name Yanyuan (盐源) literally means "Salt source". Until recently, Yanyuan was poorly connected with the rest of China by road. In the 2010s, a new tunnel was built through the mountains east of Yanyuan to connect the county with the prefecture capital of Xichang.

== Administrative divisions ==
Yanyuan County comprises 1 subdistrict, 17 towns, 5 townships and 1 ethnic township.

Name	Simplified Chinese	Hanyu Pinyin	Yi	Romanized Yi	Administrative division code
Subdistrict
Yanjing Subdistrict	盐井街道	Yánjǐng Jiēdào	ꑸꏢꏦꈜ	yiep ji jie gga	513423001
Towns
Weicheng Town	卫城镇	Wèichéng Zhèn	ꁇꇓꍔ	pox lur zhep	513423101
Meiyu Town	梅雨镇	Méiyǔ Zhèn	ꂱꒃꍔ	mip yu zhep	513423102
Baiwu Town	白乌镇	Báiwū Zhèn	ꀙꃶꍔ	bip vu zhep	513423103
Shuhe Town	树河镇	Shùhé Zhèn	ꏂꃪꉼꍔ	shy vat hop zhep	513423104
Huangcao Town	黄草镇	Huángcǎo Zhèn	ꉸꊻꍔ	huop cuo zhep	513423105
Pingchuan Town	平川镇	Píngchuān Zhèn	ꀻꍧꍔ	pip chuo zhep	513423106
Luguhu Town	泸沽湖镇	Lúgūhú Zhèn	ꇈꈬꎿꍔ	lox ggu shur zhep	513423107
Guandi Town	官地镇	Guāndì Zhèn	ꇜꃅꍔ	gi mu zhep	513423108
Meiziping Town	梅子坪镇	Méizǐpíng Zhèn	ꂱꊪꀻꍔ	mip zy pip zhep	513423109
Runyan Town	润盐镇	Rùnyán Zhèn	ꑸꏢꍔ	yiep ji zhep	513423110
Changbai Town	长柏镇	Chángbǎi Zhèn	ꍤꀙꍔ	chap bip zhep	513423111
Jiami Town	甲米镇	Jiǎmǐ Zhèn	ꏧꂰꍔ	jiep mi zhep	513423112
Mianya Town	棉桠镇	Miányā Zhèn	ꂱꑵꍔ	mip yiet zhep	513423113
Yantang Town	盐塘镇	Yántáng Zhèn	ꑸꄤꍔ	yiep tap zhep	513423114
Jinhe Town	金河镇	Jīnhé Zhèn	ꏢꉼꍔ	ji hop zhep	513423115
Longtang Town	龙塘镇	Lóngtáng Zhèn	ꇊꄤꍔ	lop tap zhep	513423116
Xinglong Town	兴隆镇	Xīnglóng Zhèn	ꑝꇊꍔ	xit lop zhep	513423117
Townships
Tengqiao Township	藤桥乡	Téngqiáo Xiāng	ꄯꐋꑣ	tep qop xie	513423206
Tianwan Township	田湾乡	Tiánwān Xiāng	ꄝꃬꑣ	tip va xie	513423207
Yousuo Township	右所乡	Yòusuǒ Xiāng	ꒀꌘꑣ	yop sox xie	513423215
Wodi Township	沃底乡	Wòdǐ Xiāng	ꊉꄂꑣ	wop di xie	513423222
Wali Township	洼里乡	Wālǐ Xiāng	ꃪꅫꑣ	vat hnip xie	513423224
Ethnic township
Dapo Mongolia Ethnic Township	大坡蒙古族乡	Dàpō Ménggǔzú Xiāng	ꄊꁆꃀꇴꋇꑣ	dap pot mop gu cup xie	513423223

== Geography ==
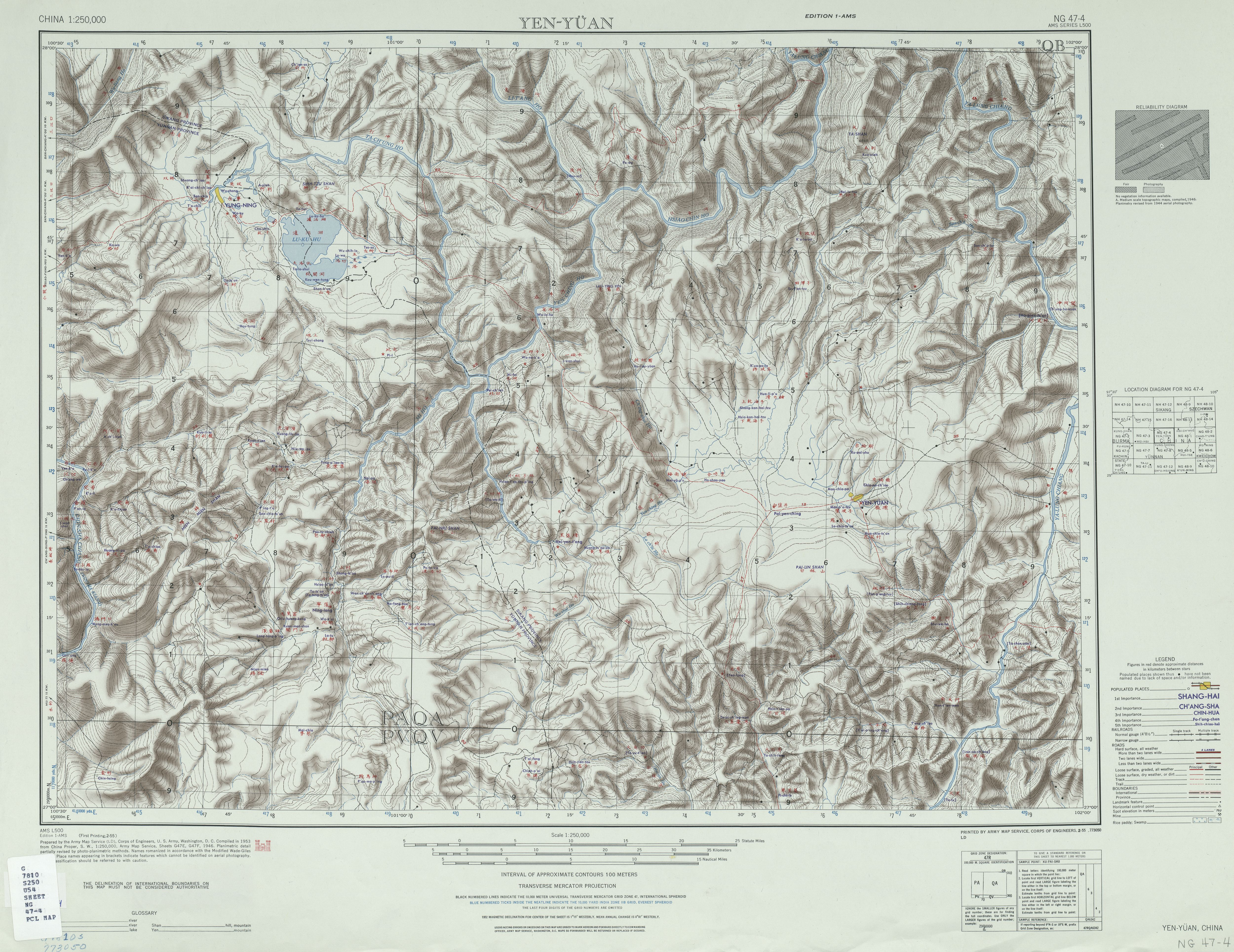
Yanyuan (labelled as YEN-YÜAN 塩源) (1953)

In the west, Yanyuan County encompasses the eastern shores of Lugu Lake, shared with Yunnan Province. To the north and east, Yanyuan is bordered by the Yalong River that cuts a deep gorge through the mountains. The Yalong forms a dramatic bend as it diverts around the Jinping Mountains in northern Yanyuan.

Yanyuan is composed of the eight towns, 25 townships, and one ethnic township.

== Climate ==
Climate data for Yanyuan, elevation 2,517 m (8,258 ft), (1991–2020 normals, extremes 1981–present)
Month	Jan	Feb	Mar	Apr	May	Jun	Jul	Aug	Sep	Oct	Nov	Dec	Year
Record high °C (°F)	23.4 (74.1)	22.9 (73.2)	26.9 (80.4)	28.3 (82.9)	29.8 (85.6)	30.0 (86.0)	30.7 (87.3)	31.1 (88.0)	29.1 (84.4)	27.6 (81.7)	25.4 (77.7)	20.4 (68.7)	31.1 (88.0)
Mean daily maximum °C (°F)	13.1 (55.6)	15.4 (59.7)	18.3 (64.9)	21.1 (70.0)	22.8 (73.0)	23.4 (74.1)	22.7 (72.9)	22.6 (72.7)	21.2 (70.2)	19.4 (66.9)	16.0 (60.8)	13.2 (55.8)	19.1 (66.4)
Daily mean °C (°F)	5.7 (42.3)	8.1 (46.6)	11.2 (52.2)	14.1 (57.4)	16.5 (61.7)	17.8 (64.0)	17.5 (63.5)	17.2 (63.0)	15.7 (60.3)	13.0 (55.4)	8.6 (47.5)	5.7 (42.3)	12.6 (54.7)
Mean daily minimum °C (°F)	−0.8 (30.6)	1.5 (34.7)	4.6 (40.3)	7.7 (45.9)	10.9 (51.6)	13.7 (56.7)	14.1 (57.4)	13.6 (56.5)	12.2 (54.0)	8.6 (47.5)	3.0 (37.4)	−0.5 (31.1)	7.4 (45.3)
Record low °C (°F)	−7.8 (18.0)	−6.7 (19.9)	−6.3 (20.7)	0.0 (32.0)	2.4 (36.3)	6.3 (43.3)	7.0 (44.6)	6.8 (44.2)	3.3 (37.9)	−0.4 (31.3)	−5.0 (23.0)	−11.3 (11.7)	−11.3 (11.7)
Average precipitation mm (inches)	3.9 (0.15)	2.4 (0.09)	8.5 (0.33)	23.7 (0.93)	67.9 (2.67)	155.3 (6.11)	211.3 (8.32)	168.2 (6.62)	107.9 (4.25)	39.6 (1.56)	11.5 (0.45)	1.3 (0.05)	801.5 (31.53)
Average precipitation days (≥ 0.1 mm)	1.9	1.9	3.7	6.9	12.1	18.3	22.3	19.2	17.4	9.6	3.3	1.1	117.7
Average snowy days	2.5	1.7	0.9	0.3	0.1	0.2	0	0	0	0.1	0.5	0.9	7.2
Average relative humidity (%)	43	38	38	44	55	71	79	78	78	71	62	54	59
Mean monthly sunshine hours	263.7	253.4	271.1	259.8	238.7	178.0	148.2	162.2	141.6	205.2	235.1	252.8	2,609.8
Percentage possible sunshine	80	80	72	67	57	43	35	40	39	58	73	79	60
Source: China Meteorological Administration All-time October highall-time November record high
