= Yajiang County =

Nyagqu County 雅江县 · ཉག་ཆུ་རྫོང་། Yajiang, Nyagchukha, Nyagquka
- County
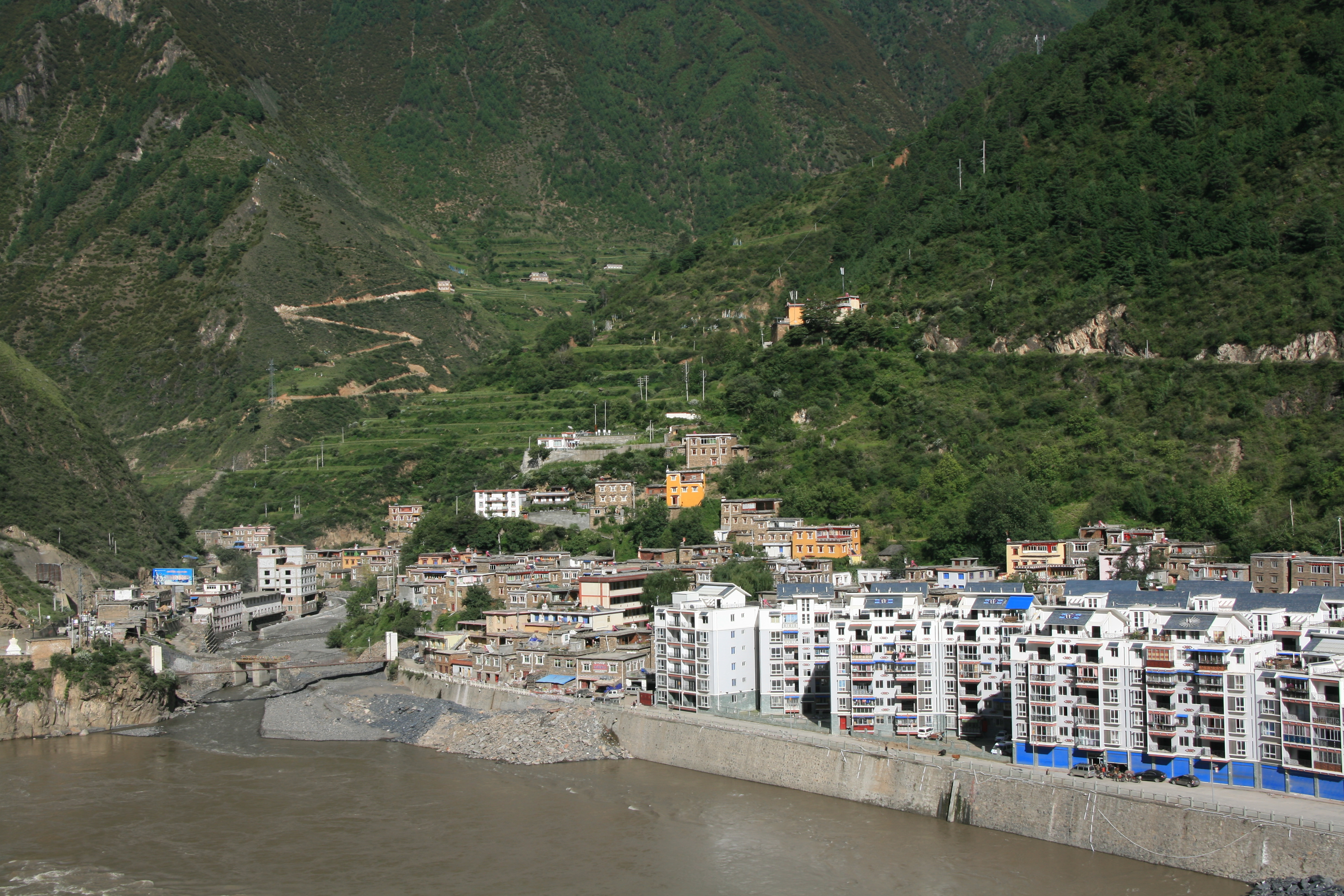

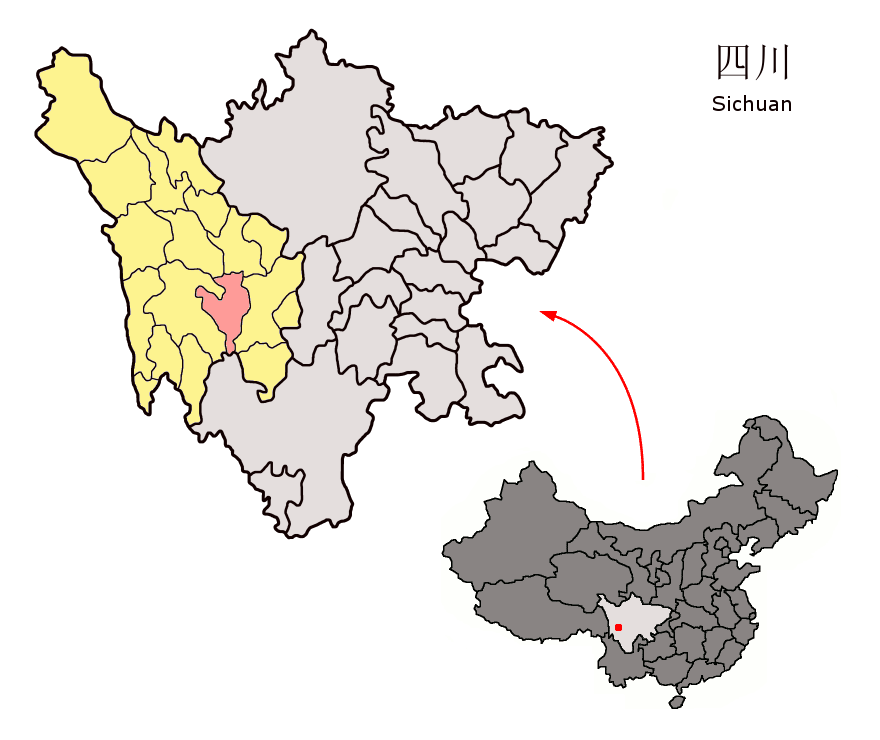
- Location of Yajiang County (red) within Garzê Prefecture (yellow) and Sichuan

- Location of the seat in Sichuan Yajiang (China)
- Coordinates: 30°01′55″N 101°00′50″E
- Country: China
- Province: Sichuan
- Autonomous prefecture: Garzê
- County seat: Quka Town (Hekou)

Area
  - Total: 7,558 km^{2} (2,918 sq mi)

Population (2020)
  - Total: 51,162
  - Density: 6.769/km^{2} (17.53/sq mi)
- Time zone: UTC+8 (China Standard)
- Website: www.yajiang.gov.cn

Yajiang County

Chinese name
- Simplified Chinese: 雅江县
- Traditional Chinese: 雅江縣
Transcriptions
Standard Mandarin
- Hanyu Pinyin: Yǎjiāng Xiàn

Tibetan name
- Tibetan: ཉག་ཆུ་རྫོང་།
Transcriptions
- Wylie: nyag chu rdzong
- Tibetan Pinyin: Nyagqu Zong

Nyagqu County (Tibetan: ཉག་ཆུ་རྫོང་།, Wylie: nyag chu rdzong, ZWPY: Nyagqu Zong, Nyagchukha, Nyagquka) or Yajiang County (Chinese: 雅江县; pinyin: Yǎjiāng Xiàn), named after Nyagchukha in Tibetan, is a county of the traditional Kham Region of eastern Tibet. It is currently under the administration of the Garzê Tibetan Autonomous Prefecture, in the west of Sichuan Province, China.

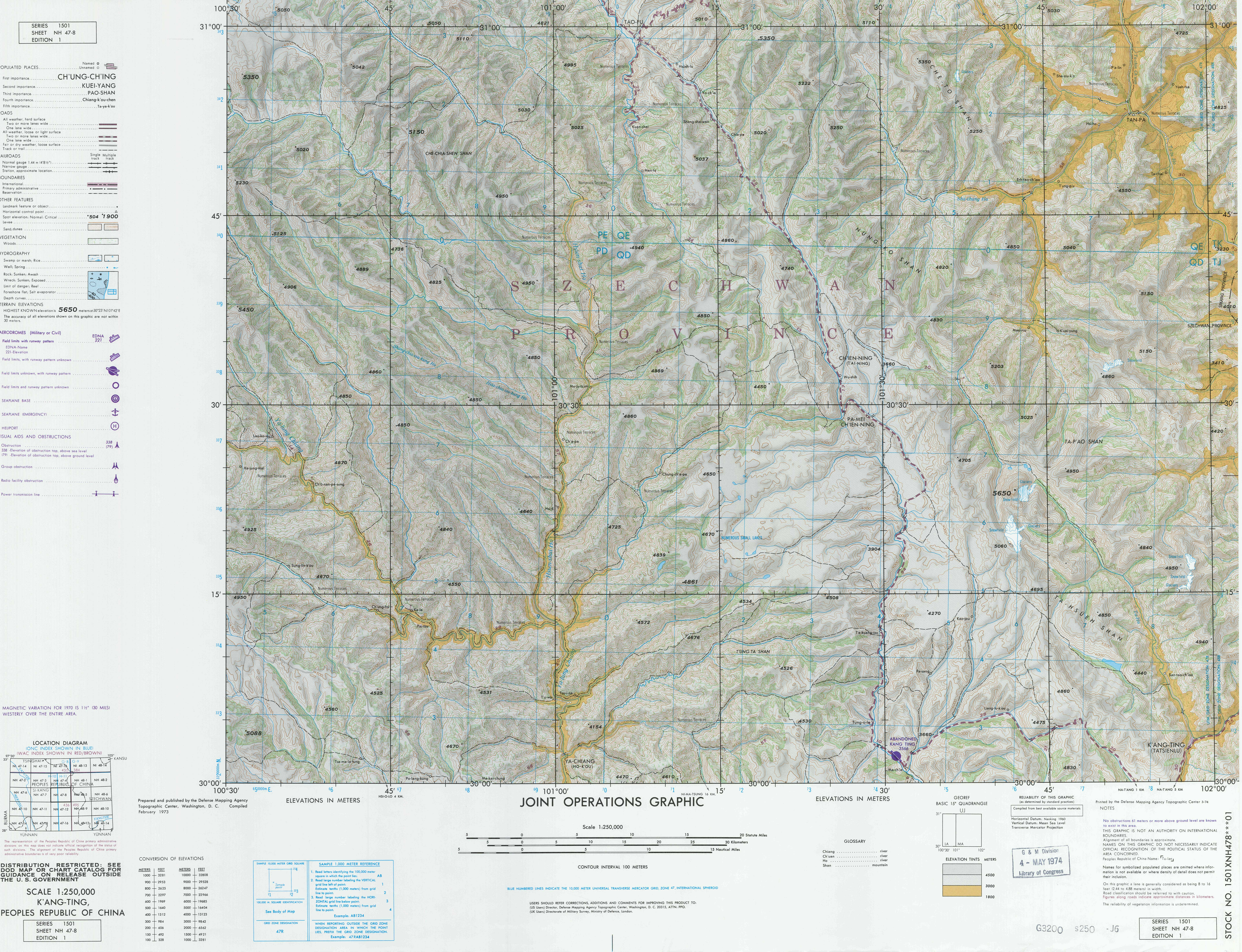

== Administrative divisions ==
Yajiang County is divided into 6 towns and 10 township.

Name	Simplified Chinese	Hanyu Pinyin	Tibetan	Wylie	Administrative division code
Towns
Quka Town (Hekou)	河口镇	Hékǒu Zhèn	ཆུ་ཁ་གྲོང་རྡལ།	chu kha grong rdal	513325100
Garra Town (Gala)	呷拉镇	Gālā Zhèn	མགར་ར་གྲོང་རྡལ།	mgar ra grong rdal	513325101
Golog Town (Xi'eluo)	西俄洛镇	Xī'éluò Zhèn	མགོ་ལོག་གྲོང་རྡལ།	mgo log grong rdal	513325102
Horlung Town (Honglong)	红龙镇	Hónglóng Zhèn	ཧོར་ལུང་གྲོང་རྡལ།	hor lung grong rdal	513325103
Malhaco Town (Marlamco, Malangcuo)	麻郎措镇	Málángcuò Zhèn	མ་ལྷ་མཚོ་གྲོང་རྡལ།	ma lha mtsho grong rdal	513325104
Bosêrxoi Town (Bosihe)	波斯河镇	Bōsīhé Zhèn	སྤོ་སེར་ཤོད་གྲོང་རྡལ།	spo ser shod grong rdal	513325105
Townships
Karringbo Township (Bajiaolou)	八角楼乡	Bājiǎolóu Xiāng	མཁར་རིང་པོ་ཤང་།	mkhar ring po shang	513325201
Pugbarong Township (Pubarong)	普巴绒乡	Pǔbāróng Xiāng	ཕུགས་པ་རོང་ཤང་།	phugs pa rong shang	513325202
Chongsum Township (Zhusang)	祝桑乡	Zhùsāng Xiāng	གྲོང་གསུམ་ཤང་།	grong gsum shang	513325203
Mignor Township (Milong)	米龙乡	Mǐlóng Xiāng	མིག་ནོར་ཤང་།	mig nor shang	513325204
Banyugrong Township (Bayirong)	八衣绒乡	Bāyīróng Xiāng	སྤ་སྨྱུག་རོང་ཤང་།	spa smyug rong shang	513325205
Nyayüxab Township (Yayihe)	牙衣河乡	Yáyīhé Xiāng	ཉ་ཡུལ་ཞབས་ཤང་།	nya yul zhabs shang	513325208
Dêca Township (Decha)	德差乡	Déchā Xiāng	སྡེ་ཚྭ་ཤང་།	sde tshwa shang	513325211
Kogla Township (Kela)	柯拉乡	Kēlā Xiāng	ཁོག་ལ་ཤང་།	khog la shang	513325213
Chuka Township (Waduo)	瓦多乡	Wǎduō Xiāng	གྲུ་ཁ་ཤང་།	gru kha shang	513325214
Misang Township (Murong)	木绒乡	Mùróng Xiāng	མི་བཟང་ཤང་།	mi bzang shang	513325215

== Climate ==
Climate data for Yajiang, elevation 2,601 m (8,533 ft), (1991–2020 normals, extremes 1981–present)
Month	Jan	Feb	Mar	Apr	May	Jun	Jul	Aug	Sep	Oct	Nov	Dec	Year
Record high °C (°F)	26.6 (79.9)	28.1 (82.6)	33.5 (92.3)	32.6 (90.7)	35.8 (96.4)	35.7 (96.3)	35.4 (95.7)	38.2 (100.8)	33.3 (91.9)	29.6 (85.3)	26.1 (79.0)	23.3 (73.9)	38.2 (100.8)
Mean daily maximum °C (°F)	13.8 (56.8)	16.9 (62.4)	19.3 (66.7)	22.0 (71.6)	25.3 (77.5)	26.5 (79.7)	26.6 (79.9)	26.7 (80.1)	24.4 (75.9)	21.1 (70.0)	16.6 (61.9)	13.1 (55.6)	21.0 (69.8)
Daily mean °C (°F)	2.3 (36.1)	5.9 (42.6)	9.3 (48.7)	12.4 (54.3)	15.7 (60.3)	17.4 (63.3)	17.8 (64.0)	17.6 (63.7)	15.3 (59.5)	11.2 (52.2)	5.7 (42.3)	1.4 (34.5)	11.0 (51.8)
Mean daily minimum °C (°F)	−5.3 (22.5)	−2.3 (27.9)	1.5 (34.7)	5.1 (41.2)	8.7 (47.7)	12.0 (53.6)	13.0 (55.4)	12.8 (55.0)	10.7 (51.3)	5.5 (41.9)	−0.9 (30.4)	−5.1 (22.8)	4.6 (40.4)
Record low °C (°F)	−13.4 (7.9)	−9.8 (14.4)	−6.7 (19.9)	−1.5 (29.3)	1.1 (34.0)	5.1 (41.2)	6.1 (43.0)	5.3 (41.5)	2.4 (36.3)	−2.4 (27.7)	−7.6 (18.3)	−13.9 (7.0)	−13.9 (7.0)
Average precipitation mm (inches)	0.6 (0.02)	2.3 (0.09)	13.3 (0.52)	38.8 (1.53)	74.4 (2.93)	165.0 (6.50)	173.1 (6.81)	146.0 (5.75)	135.1 (5.32)	39.2 (1.54)	8.0 (0.31)	1.5 (0.06)	797.3 (31.38)
Average precipitation days (≥ 0.1 mm)	0.8	1.6	5.6	11.2	14.6	22.1	21.5	19.6	18.7	10.0	3.3	1.0	130
Average snowy days	1.7	1.7	1.3	0.4	0	0	0	0	0	0	0.5	1.1	6.7
Average relative humidity (%)	35	33	39	48	54	68	74	72	75	68	55	45	56
Mean monthly sunshine hours	117.6	156.8	176.5	172.2	188.8	161.9	156.5	167.0	154.0	171.0	143.0	86.9	1,852.2
Percentage possible sunshine	36	50	47	44	45	39	37	41	42	49	45	28	42
Source: China Meteorological Administration all-time extreme temperature
