= Stefan Funk =

German astroparticle physicist (born 1974)

- Born: Heidelberg, Germany
- Education: Heidelberg University (PhD)
- Awards: Shakti P. Duggal Award; Bruno Rossi Prize

Stefan Funk is a German astroparticle physicist. He is a professor at the Erlangen Centre for Astroparticle Physics at the FAU Erlangen-Nuernberg in Germany and an elected a fellow of the American Physical Society.

== Life and scientific work ==
Stefan Funk studied physics at the Humboldt University of Berlin from 1996 to 2002. Subsequently, he worked as a PhD student in the gamma-ray astrophysics group of Werner Hofmann at the Max Planck Institute for Nuclear Physic (MPIK) in Heidelberg, where he received his PhD from Heidelberg University in 2005. The work of his doctoral thesis is the commissioning and characterisation of the central trigger system of the High Energy Stereoscopic System (H.E.S.S.) gamma-ray telescopes and the survey of the Galactic plane with H.E.S.S. at TeV energies.

From 2006 to 2007 Funk worked at the SLAC National Accelerator Laboratory in Menlo Park, California, US as a postdoctoral researcher on GLAST (later Fermi-LAT), a NASA satellite that was launched on June 11, 2008, working with Roger Blandford, Elliott Bloom and Persis Drell. In 2007, he became an assistant professor in the Physics department at Stanford University and the SLAC National accelerator center. He became Associate Professor with tenure in 2013. During that time, Funk was a group leader in the Kavli Institute for Particle Astrophysics and Cosmology working on high-energy astrophysics with the Fermi-LAT satellite.

He returned to Germany in 2014 to work at the Erlangen Centre for Astroparticle Physics (ECAP) at FAU Erlangen-Nuernberg. Scientifically, he continued his work on H.E.S.S. and the Fermi-LAT, but also focussed more on research and development for the Cherenkov Telescope Array (CTA). His group is developing camera electronics for CTA and he is also involved in the scientific preparation of the observatory.

== Main research areas ==
Stefan Funk's area of research is high energy astrophysics and astroparticle physics, in particular the search for the origin of cosmic rays using gamma rays and the understanding of the particle nature of dark matter. Funk is also involved in projects in laboratory astrophysics where astrophysical processes are reproduced in laboratory settings and in topics in astro quantum optics, such as super-high angular resolution optical intensity interferometry.

== Distinctions and awards ==
Funk is a recipient of IUPAP's 2009 Shakti P. Duggal Award to recognise outstanding work by a young scientist in the field of cosmic ray physics. In 2010, he received the Bruno Rossi Prize from the American Astronomical Society with the H.E.S.S. team, and in 2011 with the Fermi-LAT team. He is a Thomson Reuters highly cited researcher in 2015 and 2016, and was elected as an APS Fellow in 2016.
