= Shilongba Hydropower Station =

Dam in on the upper reaches of the Tanglang River

Shilongba Hydropower Station 石龙坝水电站
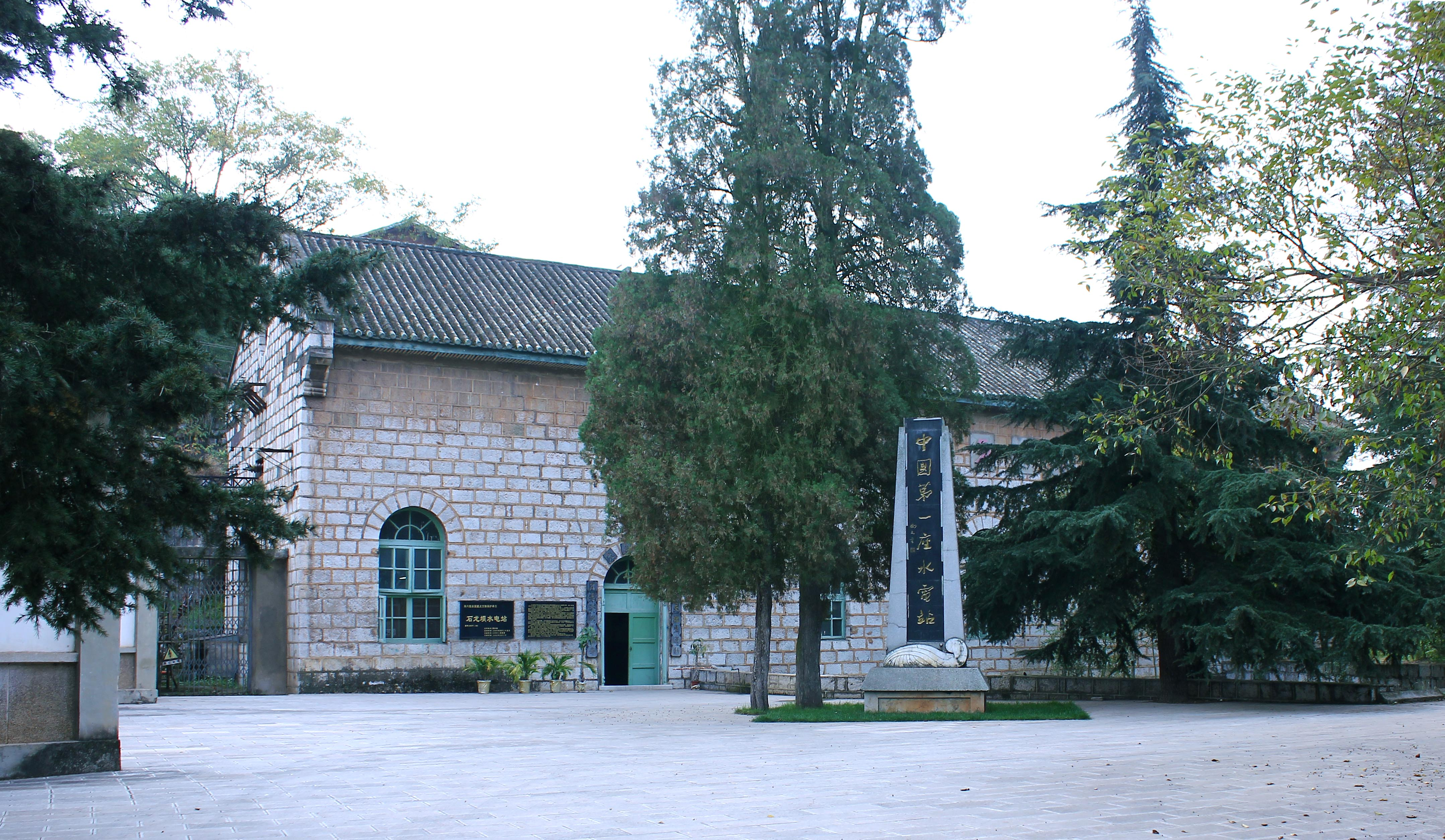
- Interactive map of Shilongba Hydropower Station 石龙坝水电站
- Country: China
- Location: on the upper reaches of the Tanglang River
- Purpose: Power
- Opening date: July 1910

The Shilongba Hydropower Station (Chinese: 石龙坝水电站), also called as Shilongba Dam, is the first hydropower station in Mainland China. "Shilongba" refers to "Stone Dragon Dam". The plant is located upstream of the Tanglang River in Haikou Town, Xishan District, Kunming City, Yunnan Province.

At present, the hydropower station is still operating normally, and the more than 20 million kWh of electricity that it keeps producing each year is still being delivered to parts of China.

== History ==
In 1908 (Qing Dynasty, Year 34 of Guangxu), wealthy Yunnan merchant Wang Xiaozhai (王筱斋), also known as Wang Hongtu (王鸿图), took the lead in recruiting commercial stocks to prepare for the construction of the plant.

In July 1910, the construction of the plant began, with a total installed capacity of 480 kilowatts, and on the evening of May 28, 1912, the hydropower station officially generated electricity, using 22kV transmission lines to supply power to Kunming, which was 32 kilometers away from the power station.

During the Second Sino-Japanese War, the Japanese Air Force bombed the Shilongba Hydropower Station four times from 1939 to 1941, but still failed to destroy the power supply.

Since 2002, four small fertilizer and chemical plants located upstream of the Shilongba Hydropower Station have discharged excessive sewage into the Tanglang River, causing serious corrosion of the station's equipment and forcing it to shut down on 14 October 2003 and resume power generation on December 10, 2003.

== Media coverage ==
In January 1927, the first issue of the seventh volume of the German Siemens Magazine published an article titled "Yunnan-Fu, China's First Hydropower Station", specifically evaluating Shilongba Hydropower Station. The article said, "In the remote hinterland of this country, in places far away from world trends and cultural isolation, there have also been those who have transplanted the achievements of Western technology onto their own soil, as some of the brilliant intellectuals and people who dare to pioneer in related parties have done this".
