= Jinping Mountains =

Mountain range in Sichuan, China

- Location within Sichuan Location within China

Highest point
- Peak: Jinping Shan
- Elevation: 4,420 m (14,500 ft)
- Prominence: 1,630 m (5,350 ft)
- Listing: Ultra
- Coordinates: 28°20′38″N 101°45′12″E

Naming
- Native name: 锦屏山 (Chinese)

Geography
- Country: China
- Province: Sichuan
- Parent range: Hengduan Mountains

The Jinping Mountains or Jinping Shan (Chinese: 锦屏山; pinyin: Jǐnpíngshān) are a short north-south mountain range in southwestern Sichuan Province, China. The Jinping are located within Yanyuan and Mianning Counties, both in Liangshan Prefecture. This mountain range is notable for the Jinping Bend, where the Yalong River wraps around the entire Jinping range. The Jinping Mountains, sometimes considered a large mountain massif, are approximately 80 km (50 mi) long and only 15 km (9.3 mi) wide.

== Geology ==
The Jinping Mountains are part of a complicated orogenic complex from the Indian subcontinent's collision with the Eurasian Plate and the resistance of the Yangtze Plate to the east. The mountains are primarily composed of Triassic marble.

== Geography ==
The Jinping Mountains are rugged and rise almost 3,000 m (9,800 ft) above the Yalong River on either side. The Jinping are located in the complicated grouping of mountains called the Hengduan Mountains that transition between the Tibetan Plateau in the northwest to the Yungui Plateau in the southeast. The Jinping are sometimes classified as a southern subrange of the Shaluli Mountains, a component range of the Hengduan. The Yalong River separates the Jinping Mountains from the Daxue Mountains to north.

The tallest peak of the Jinping Mountains rises to 4,420 m (14,500 ft) above sea level and has a topographic prominence of 1,630 m (5,350 ft). This peak is also known in Chinese as Jinping Shan (锦屏山) as the word for mountain (山) can refer to either a mountain or mountain range.

After flowing southeasterly, the Yalong River diverts 80 km (50 mi) north along the west side of the Jinping before turning 180 degrees and flowing south along the east side of the mountains. This forms the dramatic Jinping Bend, known for its deep gorge and inhospitable terrain.

== Human development ==
The Jinping's vertical relief and the Yalong River's 300 m (980 ft) elevation drop from one side to the other make it an optimal source of hydroelectric energy. The Jinping-I Dam, on the west side of the Jinping Mountains, is the tallest dam in the world at 305 m (1,001 ft) high. The Jinping-II Dam, a little further downstream, diverts the water of the Yalong River nearly 17 km (11 mi) under the Jinping Mountains to the east side of the bend. More than 13.2 million m^{3} of earth was excavated for the construction of Jinping-II's power station below the mountains. A total of seven tunnels were bored through the Jinping Mountains at depths up to 2,525 m (8,284 ft) beneath the mountain peaks. This included four water diversion tunnels, two auxiliary tunnels, and one construction drainage tunnel.

The China Jinping Underground Laboratory was developed along the southernmost Jinping-II tunnel through the Jinping Mountains. This institution specializes in the research of dark matter as the location deep below the surface of the earth shields the laboratory from interfering cosmic rays.

== See also ==
- List of ultras of Tibet, East Asia and neighbouring areas
