= China Dark Matter Experiment =

The China Dark Matter Experiment (CDEX) is a search for dark matter WIMP particles at the China Jinping Underground Laboratory. CDEX was the first experiment to be hosted at CJPL, beginning construction of its shield in June 2010, the same month that laboratory construction was completed, and before CJPL's official opening on 12 December.

CDEX has p-type point-contact germanium detector surrounded by NaI(Tl) crystals, similar to the CoGeNT experiment. The CDEX-0 prototype was used to develop the current CDEX-1 detector, which has a detector mass of roughly 1 kg. Future plans include scaling to CDEX-10 and CDEX-1T.

CDEX-1 had first low mass results in 2013 and published limits on WIMP masses 6–20 GeV in 2014.
