= Ertan Dam =

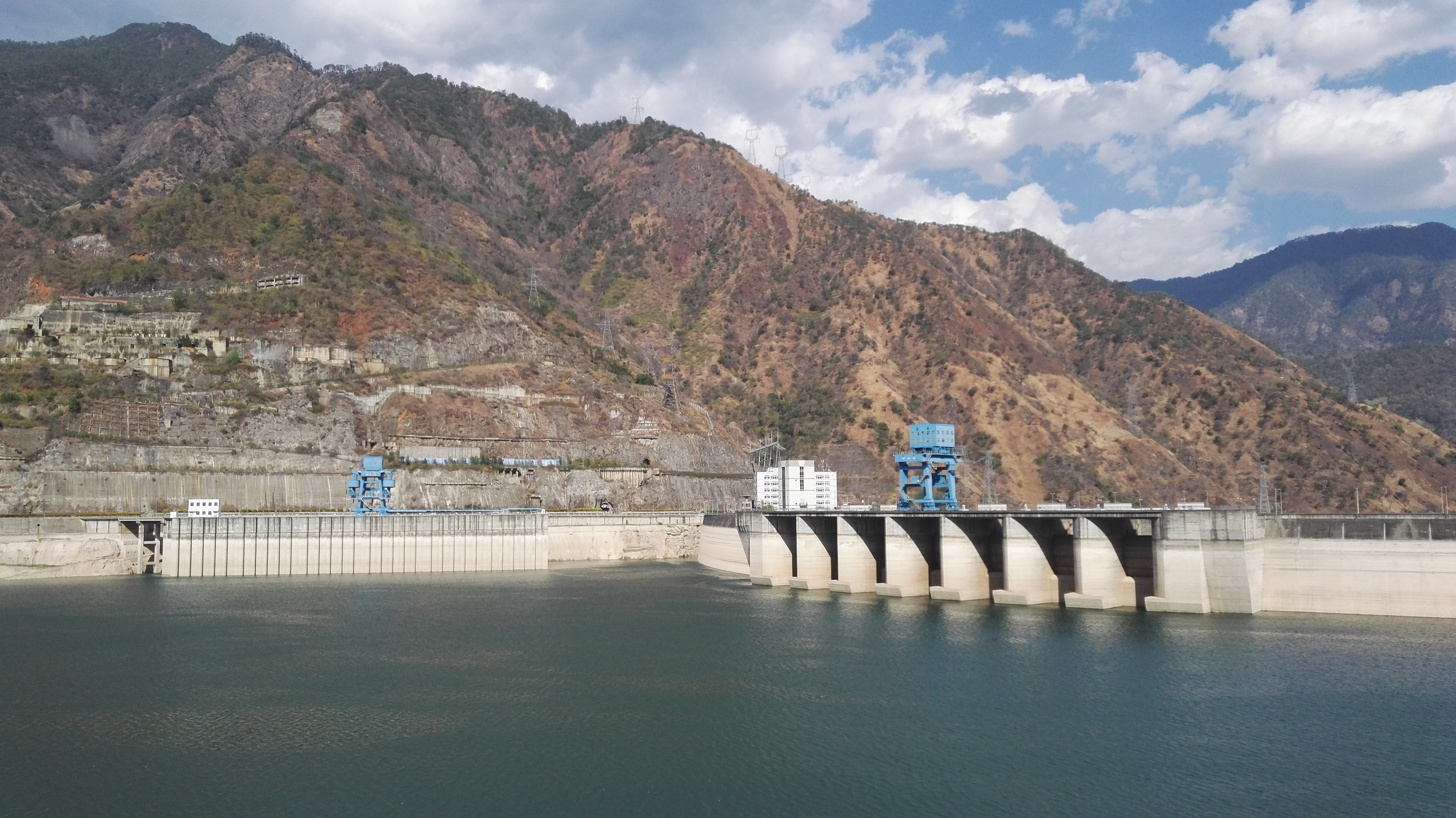

- Location within China
- Official name: 二灘大壩
- Location: Sichuan, China
- Coordinates: 26°49′15″N 101°46′52″E
- Status: Operational
- Construction began: September 1991
- Opening date: 26 December 1999
- Owner: Yalong River Hydropower Development Company, Ltd.

Dam and spillways
- Type of dam: Arch
- Impounds: Yalong River
- Height: 240 m (787 ft)
- Length: 774.7 m (2,542 ft)
- Dam volume: 5,857,000 m^{3} (206,838,003 ft^{3})
- Spillway type: 7 x crest outlets, 2 x flood tunnels
- Spillway capacity: 6,260 m^{3}/s (221,070 cu ft/s); Tunnels:7,400 m^{3}/s (261,329 cu ft/s)

Reservoir
- Creates: Ertan Reservoir
- Total capacity: 5,800,000,000 m^{3} (4,702,137 acre⋅ft)
- Catchment area: 116,400 km^{2} (44,942 sq mi)
- Surface area: 101 km^{2} (39 sq mi)

Power Station
- Hydraulic head: 189 m (620 ft) (max gross)
- Turbines: 6 × 550 MW Francis turbines
- Installed capacity: 3,300 MW
- Annual generation: 17 TWh

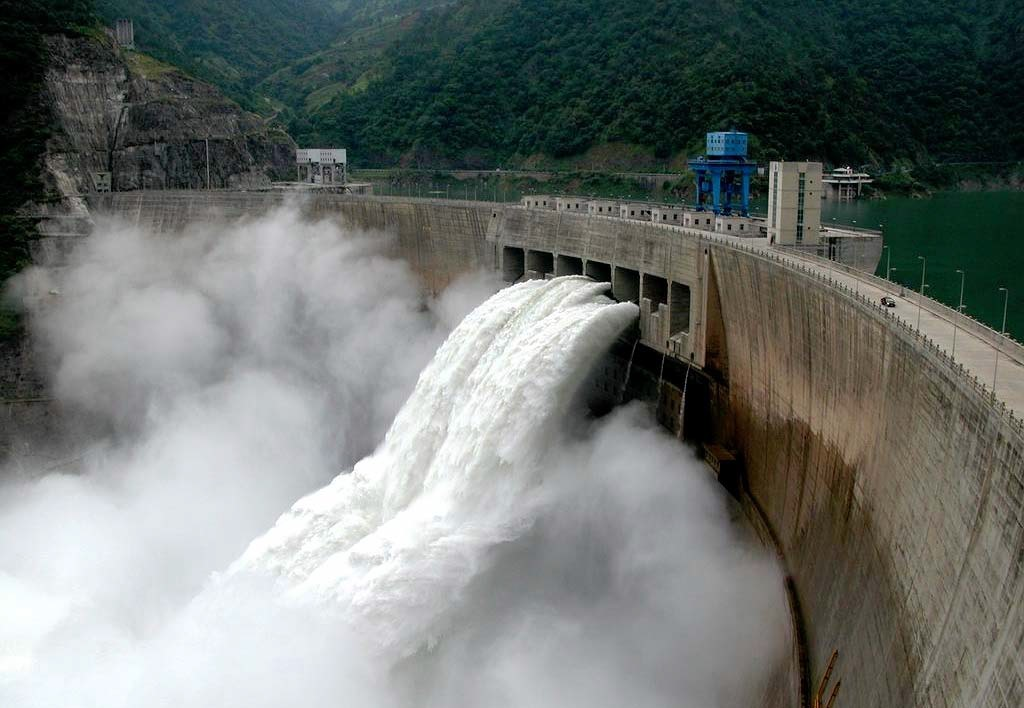
Flood discharge of Ertan

The Ertan Dam (simplified Chinese: 二滩大坝; traditional Chinese: 二灘大壩; pinyin: Èrtān Dàbà) is an arch dam on the Yalong River, a tributary of the Yangtze River in Sichuan Province, in southwest China.

The dam has six hydroelectric generators, each with a generating capacity of 550 MW. The total generating capacity of the facility is 3,300 MW, one of the largest hydroelectric stations in China. The annual production is 17 TWh, and until December 5, 2006, it has produced over 100 TWh of electricity. Construction of the dam started in September 1991 and was completed on December 26, 1999. A total of 12,638,000 m^{3} (446,306,758 ft^{3}) of material was excavated during construction.

The Ertan Dam was designed by the China Hydropower Engineering Consulting Group Survey and Design Institute in Chengdu, and was constructed and is currently operated by Ertan Hydropower Development Company Limited, the owners of the dam. The company is invested by State Development and Investment Company (52% share) and Sichuan Chuantou Energy Limited (48% share).

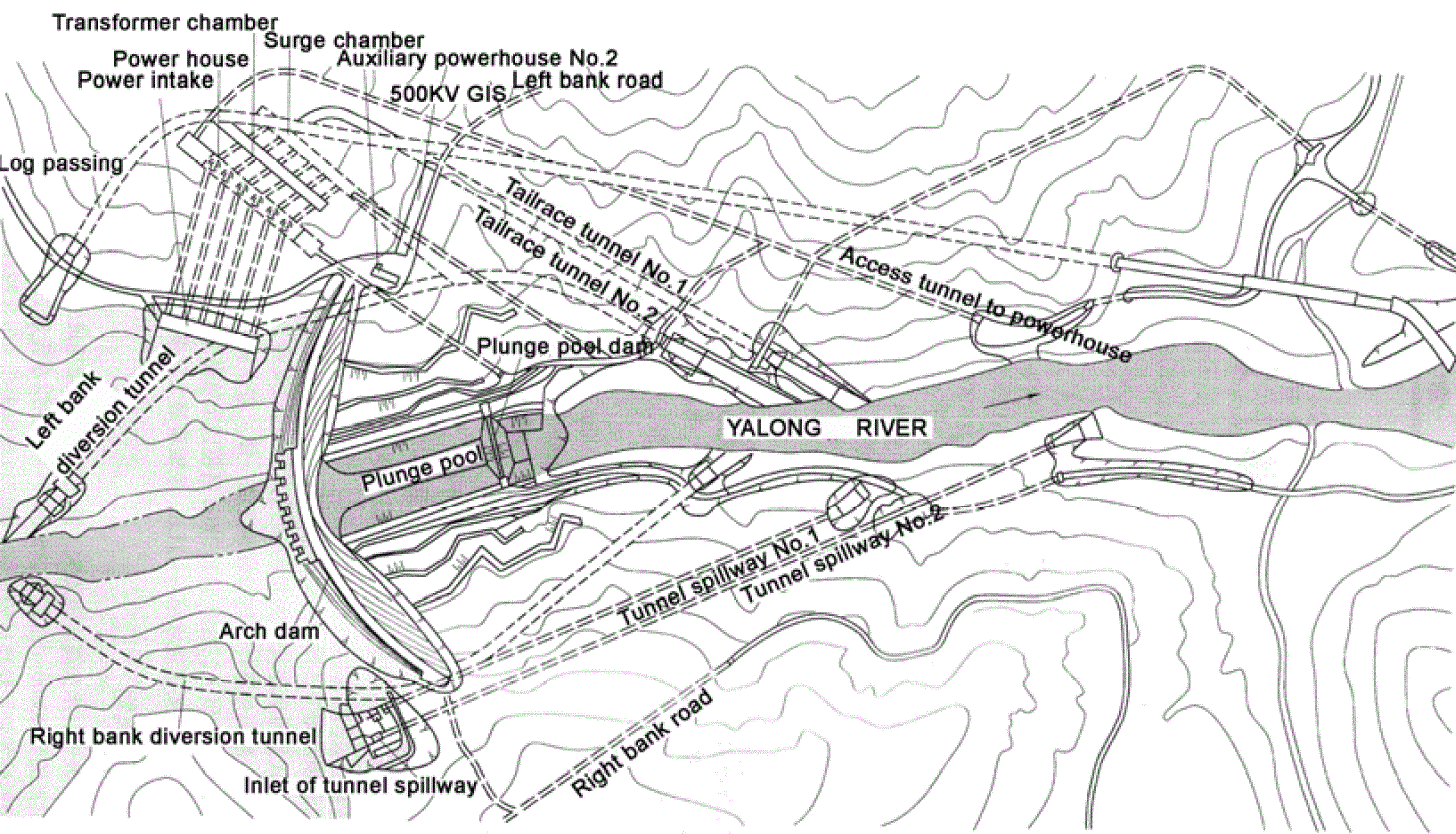
General layout of Ertan hydroelectric scheme

== Design ==
The Ertan Dam is a 240 m (787 ft) high and 774.7 m (2,542 ft) long double-curvature arch dam. The dam withholds a normal reservoir of 5,800,000,000 m^{3} (4,702,137 acre⋅ft) with a drainage area of 116,400 km^{2} (44,942 sq mi) and normal surface area of 101 km^{2} (39 sq mi). The dam has four different ways to discharge water downstream. First, the dam's spillways which contain seven floodgates at the crest and two flood tunnels can discharge 6,260 m^{3}/s (221,070 cu ft/s) and 7,400 m^{3}/s (261,329 cu ft/s) respectively. The dam also contains 6 x middle outlets and four bottom outlets that can discharge 6,930 m^{3}/s (244,731 cu ft/s) and 2,084 m^{3}/s (73,596 cu ft/s) respectively. The dam's power station is located underground along with its transformer room which is in a separate cavern. Additionally, the power station is supported by an underground surge chamber as well.

== Main Features ==
Project Location	On the Yalong River, Sichuan province, P. R. China
Project Purpose	Hydroelectric Power Generation
Years of Construction	1987-1999
Construction of Main Dam	
Type	Double-curvature Arch Dam
Height	240 m
Crest Length	774.69 m
Construction of Power plant	
Maximum gross head	189 m
Installed Capacity	6×550 MW (Francis)
Power Conduits	6 steel embedded in concrete I.D.=9.0 m
Catchment and Reservoir	
Catchment Area	116,400 km^{2}
Mean Annual Runoff	1,670 m^{3}/s
Reservoir Area at FSL	101 km^{2}
Storage at FSL	5,800 million m^{3}
Active Storage	3,370 million m^{3}
Discharge Capacity	
Crest Outlet	7 / 6,260 m^{3}/s
Mid Level Outlet	6 / 6,930 m^{3}/s
Bottom Outlet	4 / 2,084 m^{3}/s
Flood Discharging	2 / 7,400 m^{3}/s
Project Developers	
Owner	Ertan Hydropower Development Company, Ltd.
Designer	CHIDI, now POWERCHINA Chengdu
Contractor	EJV, SGEJV, GYBD
Main Equipment Suppliers	
Turbines	GE Canada, Dongfang Electrical Machinery Co, Ltd., Harbin Electric Machinery Co, Ltd.
Generators & HV Electrical	GE Canada, Dongfang Electrical Machinery Co, Ltd., Harbin Electric Machinery Co, Ltd.
Gates & Hydromechanical	Jiajiang Hydraulic Machinery Works, China Gezhouba (Group) Corporation, Sinohydro Bureau No.8,

== See also ==
- List of conventional hydroelectric power stations
- List of power stations in China
