= Yalong River =

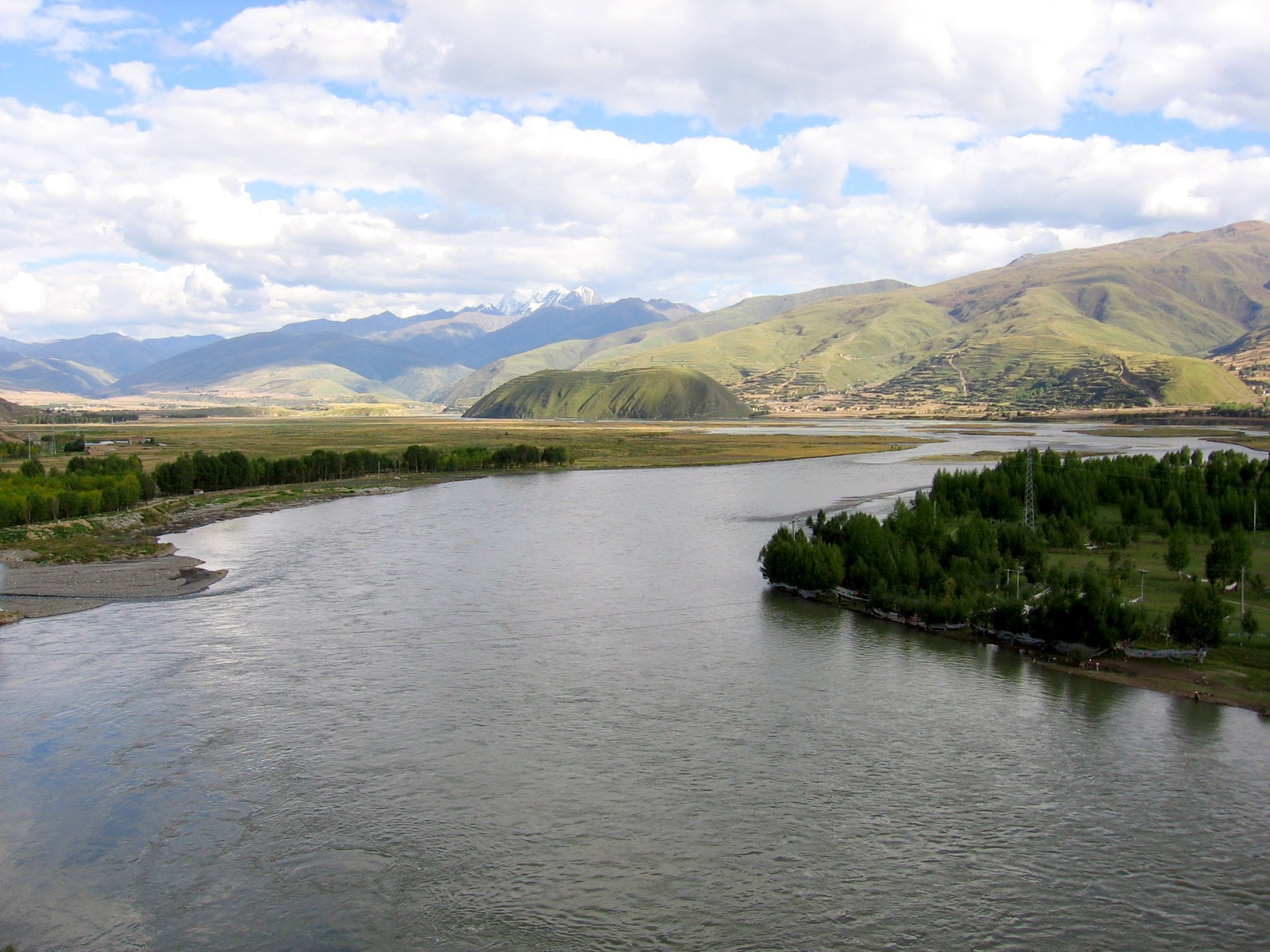
- The Yalong River at Ganzi

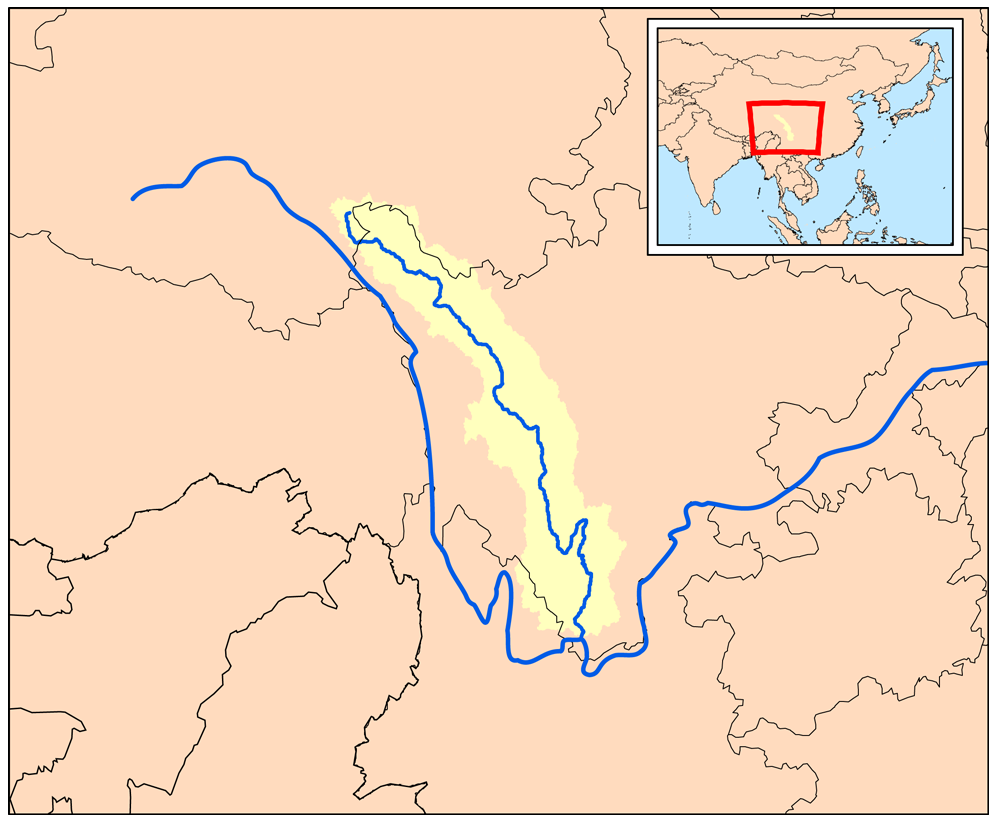
- Map of the Yalong River drainage basin

Location
- Country: China

Physical characteristics
- Source: Bayan Har Mountains
  - coordinates: 34°12′27″N 97°36′24″E
  - elevation: 4,920 m (16,140 ft)
- Mouth: Yangtze River
  - location: Panzhihua, Sichuan
  - coordinates: 26°36′20″N 101°48′5″E
  - elevation: 985 m (3,232 ft)
- Length: 1,597 km (992 mi)
- Basin size: 128,444 km^{2} (49,593 mi^{2})
- Discharge
  - location: Confluence
  - average: 1,810 m^{3}/s (64,000 cu ft/s)

Basin features
- Tributaries
  - left: Anning
  - right: Muli

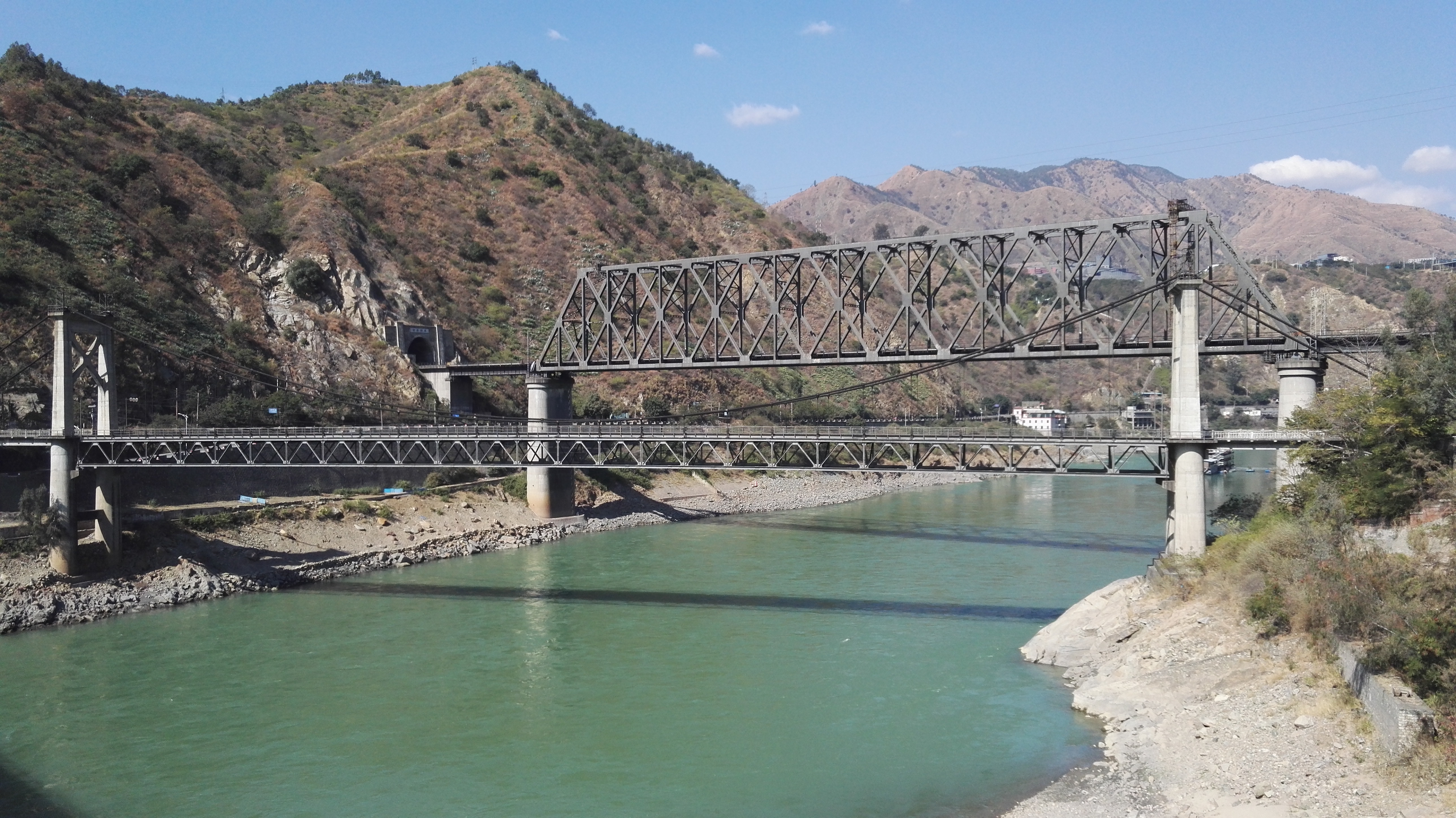
Bridges over the Yalong near its mouth in Panzhihua

The Yalong River (Chinese: 雅砻江, p Yǎlóngjiāng, w Ya-lung Chiang, IPA [jàlʊ̌ŋ tɕjàŋ]), or Nyag Chu (Tibetan: ཉག་ཆུ་, z Nyag Qu), is a major tributary river of the Yangtze River in Southwest China. With a length of 1,597 km (992 mi), the Yalong River flows from north to south through the Hengduan Mountains in western Sichuan Province.

== Course ==
The Yalong has its source in the Bayan Har Mountains on the Tibet–Qinghai Plateau in Chindu County, Yushu, Qinghai, where it is known as the Za Qu (Chinese: 扎曲). Flowing southeasterly, the Yalong gradually turns south at Garzê and travels between the Shaluli Mountains to the west and the Daxue Mountains to the east. The Yalong River channel runs through a deep gorge for much of its length south of Garzê. The southern Sichuan-Tibet Highway crosses the Yalong at Yajiang in the middle of the river's course. In Liangshan Prefecture, the river wraps 150 km (93 mi) around the Jinping Mountains creating the Jinping Bend. Here, water from the Yalong River has been diverted under the mountains as part of the Jinping-II Dam hydroelectric project. The Yalong meets the main stem of the Yangtze (Jinsha) River in Panzhihua, Sichuan.

== History ==
The upper reaches of the Yalong have traditionally been inhabited by the Tibetan nomads of the historic region of Kham. The lower course of the Yalong is deeply incised and is not conducive to human habitation. The lower course of the Yalong was historically the western limit of Chinese influence in the region.

== Dams ==
Since the 1980s, the Yalong has been heavily developed for hydroelectric power. A total of 23 dams are completed, under construction, or planned for the river. Those dams are listed below from downstream to upstream.

- Tongzilin Dam – Under construction, 600 MW
- Ertan Dam – Completed, 3,300 MW
- Guandi Dam – Completed, 2,400 MW
- Jinping 2 Dam – Completed, 4,800 MW
- Jinping 1 Dam – Completed, 3,600 MW, tallest dam in the world
- Kala Dam – Programmed, 1,060 MW
- Yangfanggou Dam – Programmed, 2,200 MW
- Mengdigou Dam – Programmed, 1,700 MW
- Lenggu Dam – Planned, 2,300 MW
- Yagen Dam – Programmed, 1,500 MW
- Lianghekou Dam – Completed, 3,000 MW
- Gongbagou Dam – Planned, 500 MW
- Gongke Dam – Planned, 400 MW
- Xinlong Dam – Planned, 500 MW
- Yingda Dam – Planned, 500 MW
- Tongha Dam – Planned, 200 MW
- Geni Dam – Planned, 200 MW
- Ada Dam – Planned, 250 MW
- Reba Dam – Planned, 250 MW
- Renqingling Dam – Planned, 300 MW
- Wenbosi Dam – Planned, 150 MW
- Danikanduo Dam – Planned, 7.2 MW
- Yangri Dam – Planned, 1 MW
