= Jinping-II Dam =

- Location within Sichuan Location within China
- Official name: Jinping-II Hydropower Station
- Location: Yanyuan County and Muli Tibetan Autonomous County, Sichuan, China
- Coordinates: 28°14′54.02″N 101°38′39.94″E
- Purpose: Power
- Status: Operational
- Construction began: 2007
- Opening date: 2014
- Owners: Yalong River Hydropower Development Company, Ltd.
- Operator: MWREP

Dam and spillways
- Impounds: Yalong River
- Height: 37 m (121 ft)
- Length: 162 m (531 ft)

Reservoir
- Creates: Jinping-II Reservoir
- Total capacity: 14,280,000 m^{3} (11,580 acre⋅ft)
- Active capacity: 5,020,000 m^{3} (4,070 acre⋅ft)
- Catchment area: 102,663 km^{2} (39,638 sq mi)

Jinping-II Hydropower Station
- Coordinates: 28°08′17.05″N 101°47′31.30″E
- Commission date: 2012–2014
- Hydraulic head: 310 m (1,020 ft)
- Turbines: 8 × 600 MW Francis-type
- Installed capacity: 4,800 MW

The Jinping-II Dam (simplified Chinese: 锦屏二级水电站; traditional Chinese: 錦屏二級水電站; pinyin: Jǐnpíng Èrjí Shuǐdiàn Zhàn), also known as the Jinping-II Hydropower Station, is a gravity dam on the Jinping Bend of the Yalong River (Yalong Jiang) in Sichuan, China. Construction on the project began in 2007 and it was complete in 2014. Its hydroelectric power station has a 4,800 MW installed capacity.

While Jinping-I relies on a conventional tall dam and large reservoir to supply water, Jinping-II uses a much smaller dam, located 7.5 km downstream of Jinping-I, to divert water into four 16.6 km long headrace tunnels. These tunnels connect to a downstream point on the same river at a much lower elevation, providing a 310 m (1,020 ft) head of water without flooding a large area of land.

== History ==
Harnessing hydropower on the Jinping Bend of the Yalong River has been in planning for decades. The river makes a hairpin bend 150 km long around the Jinping Mountains, but the downstream part of the river on the opposite side of the mountain is separated by only 16 km. In that distance, there is an elevation drop of 310 m, creating an excellent situation for hydroelectricity production. Two projects were planned for the bend, the Jinping I and Jinping II with a combined capacity of 8,400 MW. Planning for the projects began in the 1960s under the former Sichuan and Shanghai design institutes along with the Ministry of Water Resources and Electric Power. They produced the "Reinvestigation Report on The Yalong River bend (Jinping)". In July 1965, the Jinping Hydropower Engineering Headquarters was set up and designs for the Jinping 1 and Jinping 2 would progress with the East China Investigation and Design Institute .

Construction on the Jinping-II started on January 30, 2007. The dam's first generator was commissioned in December 2012, the second in January 2013. The fifth generator went online in May 2014 and the seventh in October 2014. Jinping-I was fully commissioned by July 2014 and the eighth and final generator for Jinping-II was commissioned on 26 November 2014.

== Characteristics ==
A 37 m tall, 162 m long sluice dam on the west-side of the Jinping bend diverts water into four 16.6 km long headrace tunnels towards the power station. At the power station, the water turns eight 600 MW Francis turbines with a total capacity of 4800 MW before being discharged back into the river.

About 30% of the power from the Jinping dams is used locally, and 70% will be sent to eastern China via ±800 kV bipolar HVDC transmission lines.

In addition to the four headrace tunnels, two roadway tunnels (A and B) were constructed with a diameter of 6 m (20 ft), and a drainage tunnel 7.2 m (24 ft) in diameter. These were all constructed by drilling and blasting, as were headrace tunnels #2 and #4, with a diameter of 13 m (43 ft). Headrace tunnels #1 and #3, with a diameter of 12.4 m (41 ft), were excavated by tunnel boring machine.

== See also ==
- Jinping-I Dam
- China Jinping Underground Laboratory, located at the midpoint of the tunnels
