= Jinping-I Dam =

- Location within Sichuan Location within China
- Official name: Jinping-I Hydropower Station
- Location: Yanyuan County and Muli Tibetan Autonomous County, Liangshan Prefecture, Sichuan, China
- Coordinates: 28°10′58″N 101°37′51″E
- Purpose: Power
- Status: Operational
- Construction began: 2005
- Opening date: 2013
- Owners: Yalong River Hydropower Development Company, Ltd.
- Operator: MWREP

Dam and spillways
- Type of dam: Arch, double-curvature
- Impounds: Yalong River
- Height: 305 m (1,001 ft)
- Length: 568.6 m (1,865 ft)
- Spillway type: Crest, bottom outlets, flood tunnel
- Spillway capacity: Crest: 2,993 m^{3}/s (105,700 cu ft/s); Bottom outlets: 5,465 m^{3}/s (193,000 cu ft/s); Tunnel: 3,651 m^{3}/s (128,900 cu ft/s)

Reservoir
- Creates: Jinping-I Reservoir
- Total capacity: 7,760,000,000 m^{3} (6,290,000 acre⋅ft)
- Active capacity: 4,910,000,000 m^{3} (3,980,000 acre⋅ft)
- Catchment area: 102,560 km^{2} (39,600 sq mi)
- Surface area: 82.55 km^{2} (31.87 sq mi)

Power Station
- Commission date: 2013–2014
- Turbines: 6 × 600 MW Francis-type
- Installed capacity: 3,600 MW
- Annual generation: 16–18 TWh

The Jinping-I Dam (simplified Chinese: 锦屏一级水电站; traditional Chinese: 錦屏一級水電站) also known as the Jinping-I Hydropower Station or Jinping 1st Cascade, is a tall arch dam on the Jinping Bend of the Yalong River (Yalong Jiang) in Liangshan, Sichuan, China. Construction on the project began in 2005 and was completed in 2014. Its power station has a 3,600 MW capacity to produce between 16 and 18 TW·h (billion kW·h) annually. Supplying the power station is a reservoir created by the 305-meter-tall arch dam, the tallest in the world. The project's objective is to supply energy for expanding industrialization and urbanization, improve flood protection, and prevent erosion.

== History ==
Harnessing hydropower on the Jinping bend of the Yalong River has been in planning for decades. The length of bend around the Jinping Mountains is 150 km but the downstream (northbound) part of the river on the opposite side is only separated by 16 km. Between that distance, there is an elevation drop of 310 m, creating an excellent situation for hydroelectricity production. Two projects were planned for the bend, the Jinping I and Jinping II with a combined capacity of 8,400 MW. Planning for the projects began in the 1960s under the former Sichuan and Shanghai design institutes along with the Ministry of Water Resources and Electric Power. They produced the "Reinvestigation Report on The Yalong River bend (Jinping)". In July 1965, the Jinping Hydropower Engineering Headquarters was set up and designs for the Jinping 1 and Jinping 2 would progress with the East China Investigation and Design Institute.

Construction began on 12 November 2005. The dam began to impound its reservoir on 8 October 2012. First power was generated in 2013 with the remainder of the work to be completed by 2015. The rapid impounding has been linked to reservoir-induced seismicity by a Chinese geologist. Out of hundreds of small earthquakes during impoundment, three between 3.9M_{W} and 4.58M_{W} were recorded on 22 November 2013 on a nearby fault line.

The dam began to impound its reservoir on 8 October 2012 and the first two of six 600 MW generators became operational on 30 August 2013. The sixth and final generator was commissioned on 15 July 2014. The final generator for Jinping-II downstream was commissioned in November 2014.

== Geography ==
The Jinping-I Dam is on the border of the Yanyuan and Muli counties in the Liangshan Yi Autonomous Prefecture of the Sichuan province. The Yalong River, which the dam controls, is the largest tributary of the Jinsha. For the project, approximately 7,500 inhabitants were expected to be relocated.

== Design ==
The 305-meter-tall and 568-meter-long arch dam supplies the power station with water from a 7.7 billion m^{3} reservoir, of which 4.9 billion m^{3} is active or usable storage. The dam itself has a structural volume of 7.4 million m^{3}. To control flooding, the dam is equipped with a controlled spillway on its crest with four gates and the capability to discharge up to 2,993 m^{3}/s (105,700 cu ft/s). Five bottom outlets on the dam's orifice capable of discharging 5,465 m^{3}/s (193,000 cu ft/s) and a tunnel with a discharge capacity of 3,651 m^{3}/s (128,900 cu ft/s) with augment flood control as well. The power station will contain six 600 MW Francis turbines. Water discharged from the power station is then diverted downstream by the Jinping 2 Dam to the Jinping 2 Hydropower Station.

== See also ==
- Jinping-II Dam
- List of tallest dams in the world
- List of tallest dams in China
- List of dams and reservoirs in China
