= Wuyou Temple =

Buddhist temple in Sichuan, China

- 乌尤寺
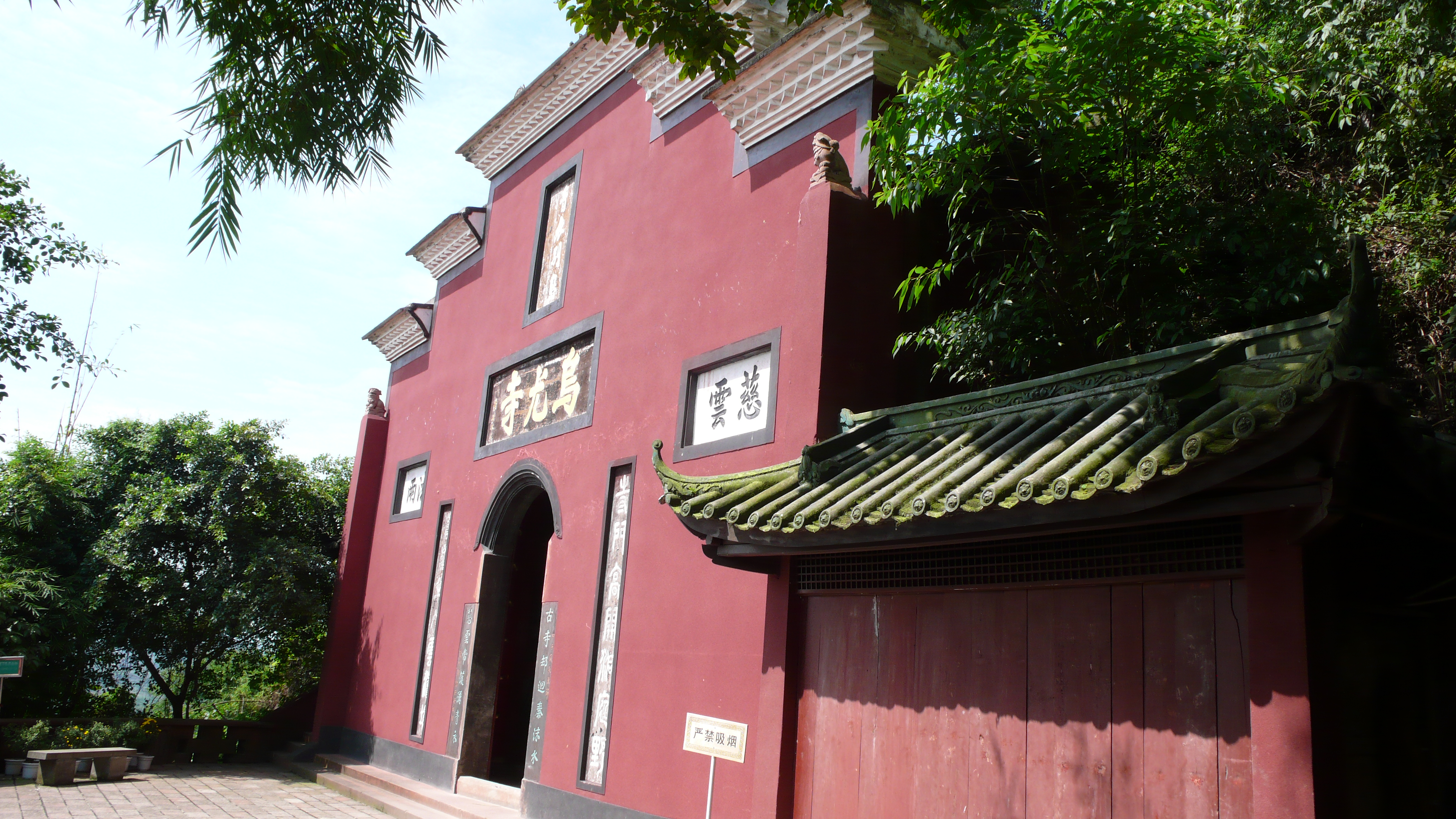
- The Shanmen of Wuyou Temple.

- Location within Sichuan Location within China

Religion
- Affiliation: Buddhism
- Sect: Chan Buddhism
- Leadership: Shi Bianneng (释遍能)

Location
- Location: Shizhong District, Leshan, Sichuan
- Country: China
- Coordinates: 29°32′35″N 103°46′41″E

Architecture
- Style: Chinese architecture
- Founder: Huijing (惠净)
- Established: Tang dynasty

Wuyou Temple (simplified Chinese: 乌尤寺; traditional Chinese: 烏尤寺; pinyin: Wūyóu Sì) is a Buddhist temple located on the top of Mount Wuyou, in Shizhong District of Leshan, Sichuan, China. It is in the same area as the Leshan Giant Buddha and is the main and oldest temple in the area, being designated as Leshan's key Buddhist temple.

== History ==
The temple traces its origins to the former Zhengjue Temple (正觉寺), founded by master Huijing (惠净) in the Tang dynasty (618–907) and would later become Wuyou Temple in the Song dynasty (960–1279). Over the course of 1,400 years, the temple was destroyed and rebuilt many times. The present version was completed in the Qing dynasty (1644–1911).

Wuyou Temple has been designated as a National Key Buddhist Temple in Han Chinese Area by the State Council of China in 1983, the only one designated as such in Leshan.

== Architecture ==
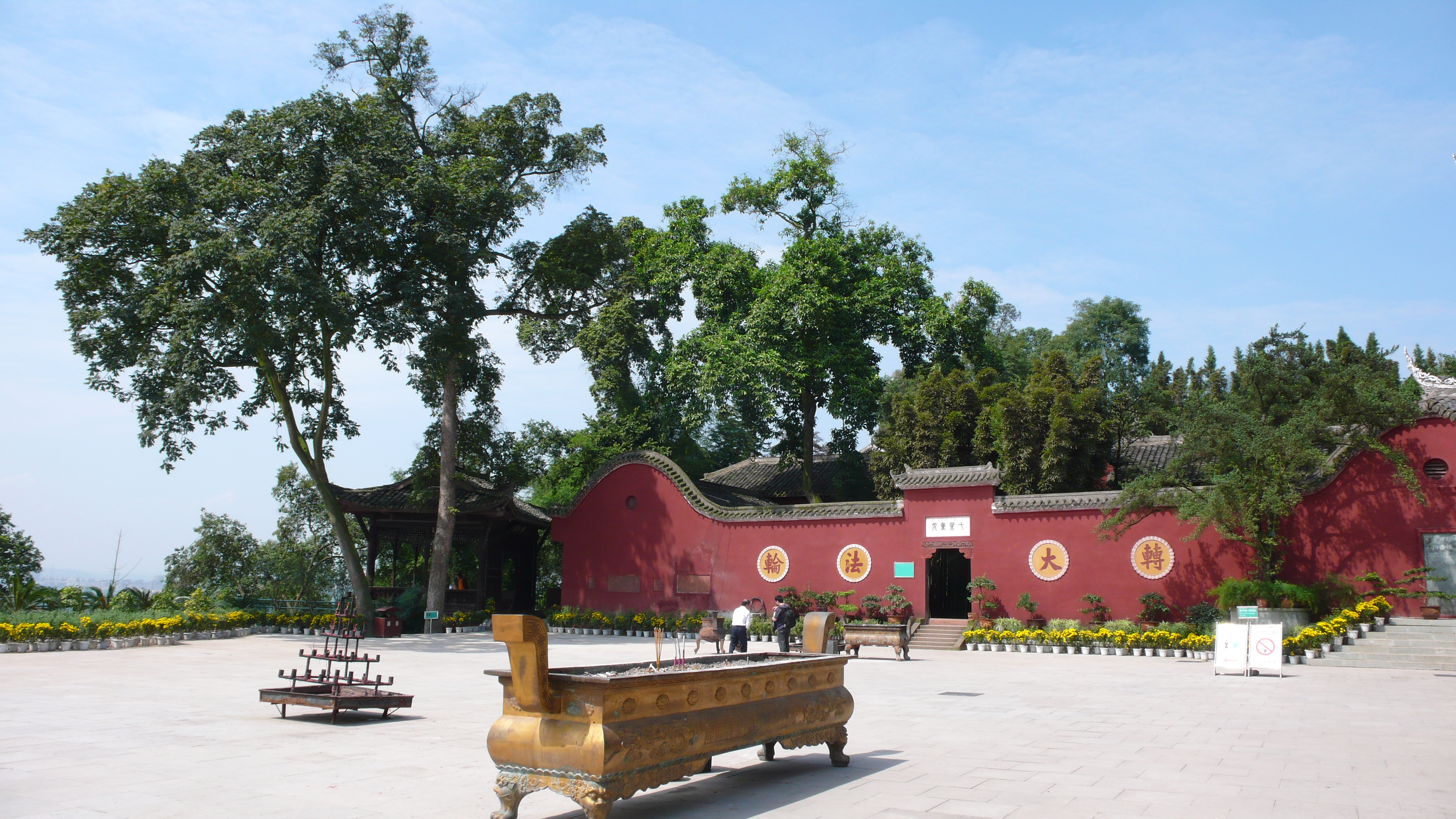
Wuyou Temple.

=== Hall of Maitreya ===
The Hall of Maitreya was built in 1920. A 5-metre (16 ft) high gilded statue of Maitreya is enshrined in the middle of the hall. A total of 48 statues of Maitreya are placed at the back of the main statue, represent 48 wishes of Maitreya.

=== Mahavira Hall ===
The Mahavira Hall was rebuilt in 1913, during the recently established Republic of China. In the center of the eaves of the hall is a plaque, on which there are the words "Mahavira Hall" written by calligrapher Huang Yunhu (黄云鹄). The hall enshrining the Three Saints of Hua-yan (华严三圣). In the middle is Sakyamuni, wood carving statues of Manjushri and Samantabhadra stand on the left and right sides of Sakyamuni's statue, respectively. Each of them is about 4 metres (13 ft) high.

=== Hall of Sakyamuni ===
Behind the Mahavira Hall is the Hall of Sakyamuni enshrining the statues of Five Tathagatas, namely Akshobhya, Ratnasambhava, Amitābha, Amoghasiddhi and Vairocana. The statues of Twenty-four Heavenlies and Eighteen Arhats stand on both sides of the hall.

=== Hall of Guanyin ===
The Hall of Guanyin enshrines a 3-metre (9.8 ft) high statue of Guanyin.

=== Arhat Hall ===
The Hall of Arhat was enlarged in 1909. During the ten-year Cultural Revolution, the Red Guards demolished the 500 statues of Arhat. Reconstruction of the hall, supervised by abbot Shi Bianneng, commenced in 1986 and was completed in 1989. Now the hall enshrines the statues of the Five Hundred Arhats, which is a grouping of arhats that encompasses Buddhist deities such as Hayagriva and Yamantaka who take the forms of arhats, as well as the Thousand-Armed manifestation of the Bodhisattva Guanyin and the Wisdom King Mahamayuri.

=== Erya Terrace ===
The name of Erya Terrace derives from Erya, the oldest surviving Chinese dictionary or Chinese encyclopedia known. It was rebuilt in 1921. By stepping on the second floor, tourists could have a clear view of Mount Le, Dadu River, Qingyi River and Min River.

=== Jingyun Pavilion ===
Jingyun Pavilion (景云亭) also known as Duhao Pavilion (独好亭). The pavilion is one of best place to appreciate the scenery of Mount Le.
