= Kamtok (Guantuo) dam =

Proposed hydroelectric dam in China

The Kamtok (Guantuo) dam is one of the newest hydroelectric projects proposed on the Yangtze River as part of the Chinese Communist Party's thirteenth five-year plan. The Yangtze is the longest river in Eurasia, and the third largest river in the world, with noted environmental and cultural significance. The potentially damaging effects of the dam to the local natural and cultural environment prompted protests in the affected Derge.(Chinese)/ Dege(Tibetan) region from a wide range of stakeholders within the local and international community. Since February activists and community members have appealed against the project, leading to arrests and violence. Human rights groups have criticised the government reaction to the non-violent protests, while the government maintains that the project is essential to meet Beijing's goal of being carbon neutral by 2060 and increase the predictability of waterflow through the river, .The sensitivity of the issue is heightened by the dam's position between the Tibetan Autonomous Region (TAR) and Sichuan Province, and raises questions about the central government's exploitation of Tibet to reach green energy goals.

== The Kamtok hydropower project ==
The Guantguo(Kamtok) dam is part of a series of 14 hydropower stations planned along the Drichu river . The dam is being developed by Huadian Jinsha River Upper Reaches Hydropower Development Co. Ltd., a subsidiary of the larger state-owned energy enterprise, Huadian Corporation. The project is expected to generate around 2240 megawatts of hydropower, with the capacity to generate 10.2 billion kilowatt hours of electricity per year . A company official has highlighted that the new power station is expected to replace 3.99 million tonnes of coal and reduce 7.37 million tonnes of carbon dioxide emissions per year after the dam is ready to operate. The dam is being constructed as part of the 13th Five-Year Plan. The plan, according to officials, is to seek to build more clean, decarbonised, safe, and efficient energy sources while reducing climate emissions where feasible . The project is set to be the largest power station on the upper reaches of the Jinsha River upon completion, with the project also bringing significant investment to the region, including 240 kilometres of roads and employment of the local population in its construction.

== Kamtok dam protests ==
Many international and local interest groups have drawn attention to the displacement of communities, the loss of historic monuments, and the environmental impact of the dam. Activists have also criticized the exploitation of Tibet, which faces the damaging consequences of dam construction, while reaping little benefit. There was no consultation of the communities which would be affected by the dam construction, and there is no official mechanism through which residents can demand consultation. The forced displacement of villages and the destruction of religious sites prompted residents and monks to gather outside of provincial government offices and monasteries to appeal to officials to reconsider the project. Despite the peaceful protest and the organized effort to draw attention to resident's concerns, videos circulated on Weibo show police abusing and arresting protesters, leaving many injured. While there had been smaller protests in 2012 when the dam was first proposed, a more organized campaign began on the 14th of February 2024 and continued across the region throughout the month. At least 300 Tibetans gathered outside of Dege County town hall to protest the construction, and it is estimated that over 1,000 monks and Tibetans were arrested in connection to the protests. About 40 monks were released at the end of the month, the majority from the 14th century Wontod monastery, renowned for its murals and artworks, which would be completely submerged were the construction to continue. An unknown number of protestors remain in custody, and authorities vowed to identify those involved in the protests and dissemination of information. International organizations such as International Campaign for Tibet are working to publicize the protests and demand international action.

In June 2025, two senior leaders of Yena Monastery in Dege County, Sichuan province, were sentenced to prison for their involvement in protests against a planned Chinese hydropower project. Sherab, the abbot, received a four-year sentence, while Gonpo, the monastery's chief administrator, was sentenced to three years and was reported to be in critical condition due to torture in detention. Authorities imposed strict surveillance and movement restrictions in the region, effectively placing around 4,000 people under collective confinement. Yena Monastery faced intensified repression, and officials reportedly targeted the two leaders for seeking legal representation.

Gonpo Tsering, a monastery staff member, was arrested by Chinese authorities for allegedly leading the Feb 2024 protests against construction of the dam. According to the International Campaign for Tibet, he was tortured and remained in critical condition in a hospital in Chengdu two years after his arrest.

== Environmental and cultural concerns ==
The Chinese government and the Huadian Corporation have not published any data or statement regarding the potential environmental impact the project may have on the region and its rivers. A company official from the Huadian corporation has publicly stated, that the company has invested more than 1.5 billion Yuan towards environmental protections, including fish ladders and fish breeding stations, as to limit the damage of construction . Experts have suggested the dam's construction will pose a serious threat to the biodiversity and climate stability of the wider Yangtze River . Alongside the damage to the ecosystem, the past construction of Chinese dams has been known to increase the risk of flooding and landslides in the areas around the projects . Concerns have been raised for the project's planned destruction of ethnic Tibetan settlements in the land clearing process for the project. This includes the Yena and Wonto Tibetan monasteries, the latter including ancient murals of great cultural significance . The dam also poses a significant threat to six Tibetan villages that would force a minimum of 4000 Tibetans to relocate out of the area into government subsidised housing and potentially destroying the cultural identity of the Tibetan communities displaced . In the past, previous dam projects have caused similar widespread displacement that's had a significant impact on the cultural diversity of the region, this includes the Three Gorges Dam project. As reported by CNN in 2020 the dam has caused the displacement of at least 1.3 to facilitate the construction while the Liberty Times from 2007 claimed the dam would displace another 4 million in the next 10 to 15 years .

== Buddhism in the area ==
The Gangtuo / Kamtok Dam is located over the Drichu / Yantze River, between Sichuan Province and the Tibet Autonomous Region. The construction of the dam would submerge at least two villages and six monasteries: Rabten, Gonsar, and Tashi in Chamdo, Tibet Autonomous Region, and Wonteo, Yena, and Khardo in Derge, Sichuan . Buddhism has a long history in China, being recorded as early as 3rd century BCE and widely introduced under Han emperor Mingdi between 57 – 76 CE. After multiple purges against the religion, including during the Cultural Revolution, Buddhism continues to be practiced across China to some degree, often in combination with Confucianist or Daoist principles As of 2014, there were over 46,000 Buddhist monks and nuns in the Tibet Autonomous Region, spread across 1,787 locations, ranging from small institutions housing 10 – 20 monks or nuns, to massive complexes with hundreds or thousands of residents. Buddhist practitioners and Tibetans in the Tibet Autonomous Region are often subject to stricter control of their religious and civil rights, including authorities violently suppressing protest and arresting activists or protestors .

== Interest groups ==
=== Local Tibetan communities ===
These include monks, villagers, and local leaders who are protesting the dam's construction due to the threat it poses to their land, homes, and monasteries. Their protests have led to large-scale arrests by the Chinese government . These protests are not a new phenomenon within the region, with protests dating back to when the dam was first proposed in 2012.

=== Chinese government and state-owned enterprises ===
The Chinese government, through state-owned enterprises, continues to push large-scale hydropower projects in Tibet to support its national energy needs. Hydropower development is framed as part of China's "West-East Electricity Transfer Project," where power generated in resource-rich western regions like Tibet is sent to the more industrialised eastern areas. However, these projects often do not benefit the local Tibetan population directly, with most jobs going to workers brought in from outside, and local opposition being harshly suppressed.

=== Human rights organizations ===
Groups such as Human Rights Watch and the International Tibet Network have condemned the projects, citing forced displacement, environmental degradation, and cultural erasure. The issue of Tibet's autonomy and the broader human rights violations in the region are also at the centre of these critiques .

=== Tourism industry ===
Tibet is a significant destination for international tourists drawn by its unique cultural heritage and natural beauty. The destruction of sacred mountains, monasteries, and cultural landscapes as a result of damming poses a threat to Tibet's tourism industry, which many locals rely on. The tourism sector may join the opposition, fearing that the loss of these sites will deter visitors .

=== Environmentalists ===
Environmentalists express concerns over the ecological impact of damming Tibet's rivers, which serve as crucial water sources for much of Asia. They argue that large-scale hydropower projects exacerbate seismic risks, alter river ecosystems, and disrupt water supplies downstream in countries like India, Bangladesh, and Laos.

== Previous hydroelectric projects ==
Since the dawn of the 21st century China has seen a series of disturbances along the Yangtze River due to the planned and actual building of the Hydrodam projects with the two most significant being seen in relation to the Tiger Leaping Gorge project and the Three Gorges Dam. Disturbances aren't just limited to the Yangtze river, with 11,000 people being relocated from 7 townships in Gonjo and Markham, bordering the river Jinsha, since 2017.

=== Tiger Leaping Gorge project ===
The Tiger Leaping Gorge situated in the Yunnan province saw the greatest success for environmental activists within China in their stopping of the dam being built. The proposed plans for the dam would have seen villages up to 320 kilometres (200 mi) upstream the Yangtze flooded and over 100,000 people displaced. Despite the success of the original protests, a scaled down version of the dam, called the Longpan Dam, has been proposed and has received less opposition.

=== Three Gorges Dam ===
The Three Gorges Dam project, completed in 2006, has seen one of the largest displacements as a result of a hydropower dam project with more than 1.2 million people displaced so that the dam could be built. Disapproval for the dam was mainly seen as non-threatening and non-violent forms including scientific reports and petitions to the local authorities.

=== Xiludo Dam ===
One of the worst cases of displacement seen as part of China's hydro-electricity push was seen at the site of the Xiludo Dam in Youngshan, where over 2,000 people were evicted and escorted by armed police and soldiers to the border of Myanmar, over 1,300 kilometres (810 mi) away. The process of construction for this project took over 8 years, highlighting the long-term disruption these projects provide to people living within the vicinity of the dam.

=== Pubugou Dam ===
A more heavy-handed approach was taken with the protesters at the Pubugou Dam project in Sichuan, where in 2004 over 100,000 people protested the construction of the dam and were met with riot police. Protests were regarding the poor compensation citizens were given for the upcoming loss of farmland, resulting in protesters occupying the dam until they were removed by the army and police.

== Bibliography ==
- 西藏之页记者 (Tibet Autonomous Region Reporter). (2024, February). 四川德格数百藏人抗议水电站建设 (Hundreds of Tibetans protest against construction of hydropower station in Dege, Sichuan. Retrieved October 2024, from 藏人行政中央 (Tibet Autonomous Region Administration):
- Adelphi. (2024, October 12). Three Gorges Dam Conflict in China. Retrieved October 2024, from Climate Diplomacy:
- Cook, S. (2017). Tibetan Buddhism: Religious Freedom in China. Retrieved October 2024, from Freedom House:
- Free Tibet. (2024, March). China's Hydropower 'Battlefield' in Tibet. Retrieved October 2024, from Free Tibet:
- Global Atlas of Environmental Justice. (2022, April 25). Violent protests over development of the Pubugou Dam, China. Retrieved October 2024, from Global Atlas of Environmental Justice:
- Guillard, O. (2024, October 4). Tibet's sacred waters in Peril. Retrieved October 2024, from Institute d'études de géopolitique appliquée:
- Hu, A.-G. (2016, December). The Five-Year Plan: A new tool for energy saving and emissions reduction in China. Retrieved October 2024, from Science Direct:
- Human Rights Watch. (2024, February 28). China: Free Detained Tibetan Demonstrators. Retrieved October 2024, from Human Rights Watch:
- International Campaign for Tibet. (2019). Daming Tibet's Rivers: How Hydropower on the Plateau is Carving Up Tibet's Landscape. Retrieved October 2024, from International Campaign for Tibet:
- International Campaign for Tibet. (2024, April 30). Derge protests put dams back on the agenda, highlight Tibet's role in powering China. Retrieved October 2024, from International Campaign for Tibet:
- International Tibet Network. (2024, September 6). UN experts warn of "irreversible destruction" in Tibet if Chinese dam project goes ahead. Retrieved October 2024, from International Tibet Network:
- Jiangtao, S. (2012, May 31). A familiar story of unrest and botched resettlement. Retrieved October 2024, from South China Morning Post:
- Kaufman, A. (2024, May 22). Reports Detail Forced Displacement and Violent Reprisals Against Protest in Tibet. Retrieved October 2024, from China Digital Times:
- Lees, O. (2021, February 8). China to build the world's biggest dam on sacred Tibetan River. Retrieved October 2024, from Aljazeera:
- Lodoe, K., & Pema, T. (2024, February 22). Exclusive: More than 100 Tibetans arrested over dam protest. Retrieved October 2024, from Radio Free Asia:
- Nyima, P. (2014, January 17). Benefits increase for Tibetan monks, nuns. Retrieved October 2024, from China Daily:
- Palmo, D., & Samdup, T. (2024, March 12). China Cracks Down on Tibetan Protest Against a Hydropower Project in Dege. Retrieved October 2024, from The Diplomat:
- Phayul Newsdesk. (2024, March 1). China imposes lockdown on seven monasteries in Kham Dege. Retrieved October 2024, from Phayul:
- Ranjan, A. (2021, October 21). China's Biggest Hydropower Projects Are on Tivetan Rivers, But Do They Benefit Tibetans? Retrieved October 2024, from The Wire:
- Reynolds, F. E., & Lopez, D. S. (2024, October 3). Buddhism: Central Asia and China. Retrieved October 2024, from Britannica:
- SBS News. (2013, August 26). A decade on, controversy still surrounds China's Three Gorges Dam. Retrieved October 2024, from SBS News:
- Staff Reporter. (2024, Marth 17). 10-Point Call from Tibetan Experts on the current Chinese Dam constructuion and forced displacement in Derge, Tibet. Retrieved October 2024, from Tibet Policy Institute:
- Standaert, M. (2020, November 5). With activists silenced, China moves ahead on big dam project. Retrieved October 2024, from Dialogue Earch:
- Standaert, M. (2020, October 5). With Activists Silenced, China Moves Ahead on Big Dam Project. Retrieved October 2024, from Yale Environment 360:
- State-owned Assets Supervision and Administration Commission of the State Council. (2024, March 1). Xiluodu Hydropower Station Has Produced Over 600 Billion KWhs of Power. Retrieved October 2024, from State-owned Assets Supervision and Administration Commission of the State Council:
- Xinhua. (2019, March 31). Construction of 2,240-MW hydropower station underway in upper Yangtze. Retrieved October 2024, from XinhuaNet:
- Yardley, J. (2007, November 19). Chinese Dam Projects Criticized for Their Human Costs. Retrieved October 2024, from The New York Times:
