= World Heritage site No. 779 =

The World Heritage Site (WHS) No. 779, Mount Emei Scenic Area, including Leshan Giant Buddha Scenic Area, includes:

- WHS No. 779-001: Mount Emei Scenic Area
- WHS No. 779-002: Leshan Giant Buddha Scenic Area,
