= Changheba Dam =

Dam in Sichuan, China

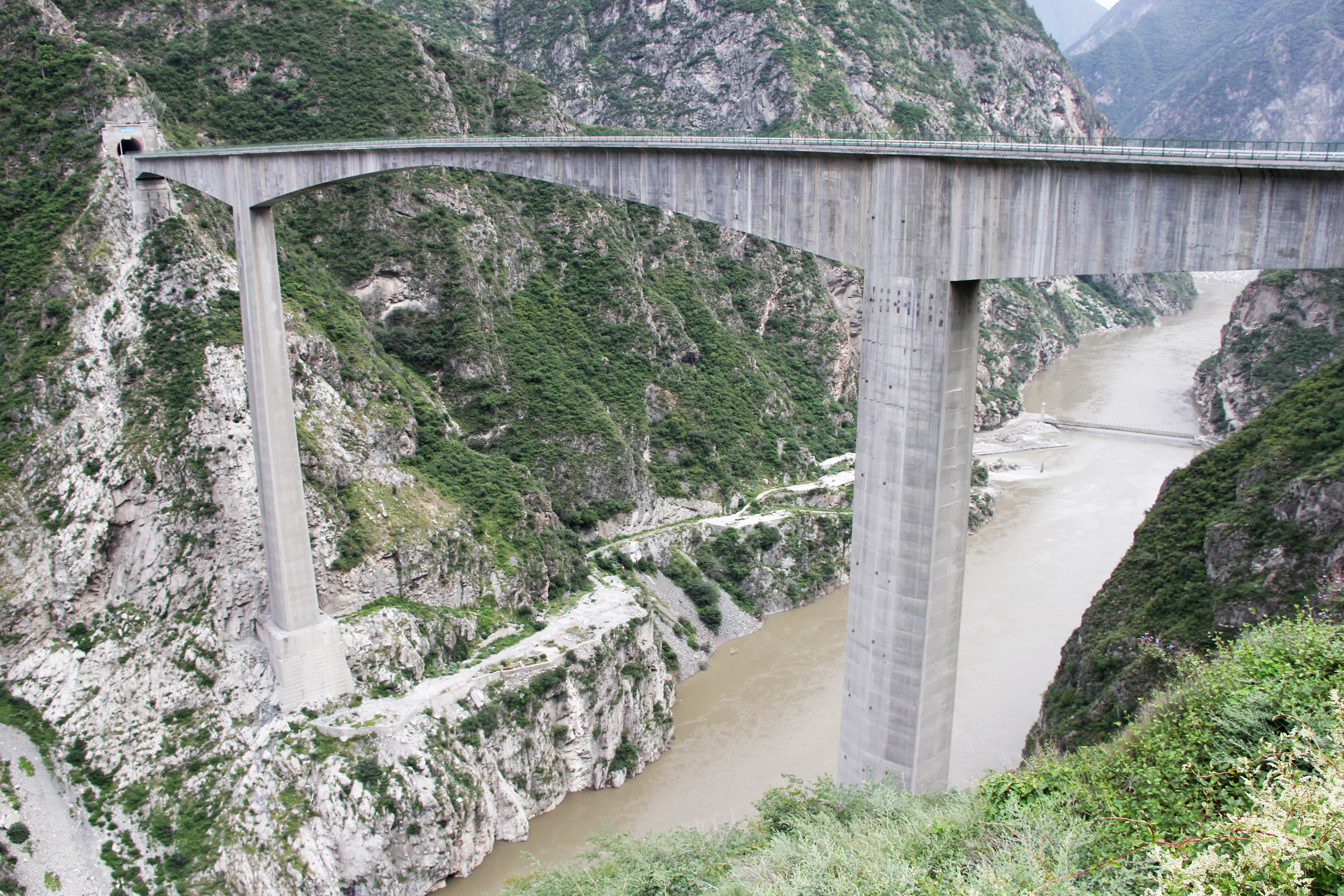
- A 200 m-high (660 ft) road bridge over the reservoir, in 2015

- Location of the dam in Sichuan
- Interactive map of Changheba Dam
- Country: China
- Location: Kangding, Sichuan
- Coordinates: 30°08′56″N 102°10′27″E
- Purpose: Power
- Status: Operational
- Construction began: 2006
- Opening date: 2017
- Construction cost: US$3.46 billion
- Owner: Datang International Sichuan Power Generation Co Ltd

Dam and spillways
- Type of dam: Rock-fill dam
- Impounds: Dadu River
- Height: 240 m (790 ft)
- Length: 1,697 m (5,568 ft)

Reservoir
- Creates: Changheba Reservoir
- Total capacity: 1,075 GL (872,000 acre⋅ft)

Changheba hydroelectric plant (Chinese: 长河坝水电站)
- Coordinates: 30°24′11″N 102°07′17″E
- Operator: Sichuan Datang International Ganzi Hydropower Development
- Commission date: 2017
- Type: Conventional
- Turbines: 4 x 650 MW (870×10^{3} hp) (all Francis-type)
- Installed capacity: 2,600 MW (3.5×10^{6} hp)

The Changheba Dam (simplified Chinese: 长河坝水电站; traditional Chinese: 長河壩水電站) is a concrete rock-filled embankment dam across the Dadu River near Kangding in Sichuan Province, China. The dam was built for the purpose of generating hydroelectricity.

== Overview ==
Construction of the concrete-faced rock-filled dam began in 2006, before it was officially approved in December 2010 and impounded in 2016. The power station was fully operational in December 2017. (Note: Although, as of April 2026, one source stated that the dam is under construction.)

The dam wall is 240 metres (790 ft) high and 1,697 metres (5,568 ft) long. When full, the resultant reservoir, has a capacity of 1,075 gigalitres (872,000 acre⋅ft). In July 2009, a landslide at the construction site killed four people while causing damage and temporarily blocking the river.

== See also ==
- List of power stations in China
- List of dams and reservoirs in China
- List of conventional hydroelectric power stations
