= Houziyan Dam =

- Location within China
- Country: China
- Location: Danba County
- Coordinates: 30°32′46″N 102°03′29″E
- Status: Operational
- Construction began: 2011
- Opening date: 2016
- Owner: Huadian Power

Dam and spillways
- Type of dam: Embankment, rock-fill
- Impounds: Dadu River
- Height: 223.5 m (733 ft)
- Length: 283 m (928 ft)

Reservoir
- Creates: Houziyan Reservoir
- Total capacity: 662,000,000 m^{3} (536,692 acre⋅ft)
- Catchment area: 54,036 km^{2} (20,863 sq mi)

Power Station
- Commission date: 2016
- Turbines: 4 x 425 MW
- Installed capacity: 1,700 MW
- Annual generation: 7.364 billion kWh

The Houziyan Dam (Chinese: 猴子岩水电站) is a hydroelectric embankment dam on the Dadu River in Danba County, Sichuan province, China.

The dam is 223.5 m tall and withholds a reservoir with a normal capacity of 662 million m^{3}. It supports a power station with a 1,700 MW capacity, distributed in 4 x 425 MW generators.

== History ==
The feasibility report for the project was completed in May 2006 and by July of that same year, the project application was granted. Construction on the dam was initially planned to start in 2007, but the groundbreaking ceremony actually took place in 2011. The project was completed in 2016.

== See also ==
- List of power stations in China
