= Leshan Giant Buddha =

Monumental sculpture

UNESCO World Heritage Site
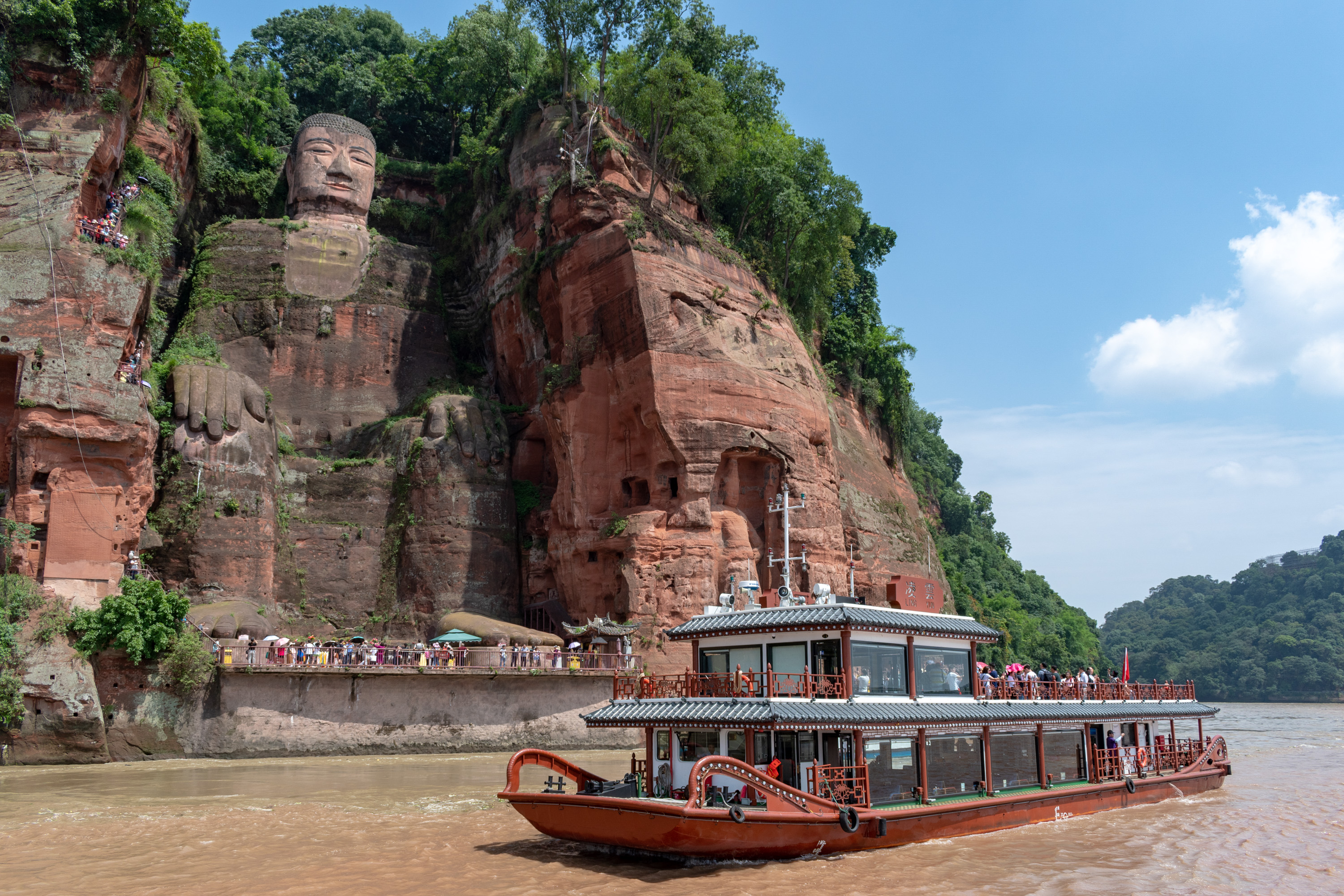
- Tourists viewing Leshan Giant Buddha from ship

- Location within Sichuan Location within China
- Location: Sichuan, China
- Part of: Mount Emei Scenic Area, including Leshan Giant Buddha Scenic Area
- Criteria: Cultural and Natural: (iv)(vi)(x)
- Reference: 779
- Inscription: 1996 (20th Session)
- Coordinates: 29°32′41″N 103°46′24″E

Chinese name
- Simplified Chinese: 乐山大佛
- Traditional Chinese: 樂山大佛
Transcriptions
Standard Mandarin
- Hanyu Pinyin: Lèshān Dàfó
Yue: Cantonese
- Yale Romanization: Lohk-sāan Daaih-faht

The Leshan Giant Buddha is a 71-meter (233 ft) tall stone statue, built between 712 and 804 AD (during the Tang dynasty). It is carved out of a cliff face of Cretaceous red bed sandstones that lies at the confluence of the Min River and Dadu River in the southern part of Sichuan Province in China, near the city of Leshan. The stone sculpture faces Mount Emei, with the rivers flowing below its feet. It is the largest and tallest stone Buddha statue in the world and it is by far the tallest pre-modern statue in the world. It is over 4 kilometers (2.5 mi) from the Wuyou Temple.

The Mount Emei Scenic Area, including Leshan Giant Buddha Scenic Area, has been listed as a UNESCO World Heritage Site since 1996.

== Location ==
The Leshan Giant Buddha is located at Lingyun Mountain's Qifeng Peak. Qifeng Peak is located at the junction of the Minjiang River, Qingyi River, and Dadu River.

Other than the Leshan Giant Buddha, the Danxia Landform also contains abundant history and cultural connotations, such as cliff tombs and cliff dwellings. The Mahao Cliff Tombs at the Leshan Giant Buddha scenic area were built in the Han dynasty, indicating ancient residents' living habits.

== History ==
Construction started in 722 AD, led by a Chinese Buddhist monk named Hai Tong. He believed that Maitreya Buddha would calm the turbulent waters that constantly plagued the shipping vessels traveling down the river. When funding for the project was threatened, he is said to have gouged out his own eyes to show his piety and sincerity. After his death, however, the construction was delayed due to insufficient funding. The statue was only completed from the shoulders up at the time. Several years later, Hai Tong's disciples continued work on the statue with financial support from a local official named Zhangchou Jianxiong. Hai Tong's disciples continued the construction until the Knees, when construction was halted because Zhangchou JianXiang was called back to serve at the royal court in Chang'an. About 70 years later, Jiedushi Wei Gao continued to support and funded the project and the construction was finally completed by Hai Tong's disciples in 803.

By the beginning of the Northern Song dynasty, the Leshan Giant Buddha had been damaged—the body was covered in moss, and the wooden pavilion had collapsed. During the reign of Song Renzong, the Giant Buddha was repaired once on a large scale and the wooden pavilion was rebuilt. Since then, the records of the destruction and reconstruction of the Buddha have been missing, and the original temple, Lingyun Temple, had been destroyed by war many times.

Apparently, the massive construction resulted in so much stone being removed from the cliff face and deposited into the river below that the currents were indeed altered by the statue, making the water safe for passing ships.

A sophisticated drainage system was incorporated into the Leshan Giant Buddha when it was built. It is still in working order. It includes drainage pipes carved into various places on the body, to carry away the water after the rains to reduce weathering.

When the Giant Buddha was carved, a huge thirteen-story wood structure (similar to the one at the Rongxian Giant Buddha) was built to shelter it from rain and sunshine. This structure was destroyed and sacked by the Mongols during the wars at the end of the Yuan dynasty. From then on, the stone statue was exposed to the elements.

== Degradation ==
The Leshan Buddha has been affected by the pollution emanating from the unbridled development in the region. According to Xinhua news agency, the Leshan Giant Buddha and many Chinese natural and cultural heritage sites in the region have seen degradation from weathering, air pollution, and tourism. To address this issue, the government has promised restoration work. Furthermore, scientists have been investigating the interactions between the microbial community in the surrounding soil and above ground plants, and its effects on the sculpture. The body of The Giant Buddha of Leshan is covered today by different organisms, lichen, ferns and other bryophytes, and various shrubs and gramineous plants. Current research hopes that greater understanding of plant- and microbe-induced weathering effects may aid in the preservation of The Giant Buddha of Leshan.

== Composition ==
The entire art piece is built in stone, except for the ears that were designed in wood, covered with mud on the surface to make clay, and attached to the head.

== Dimensions ==
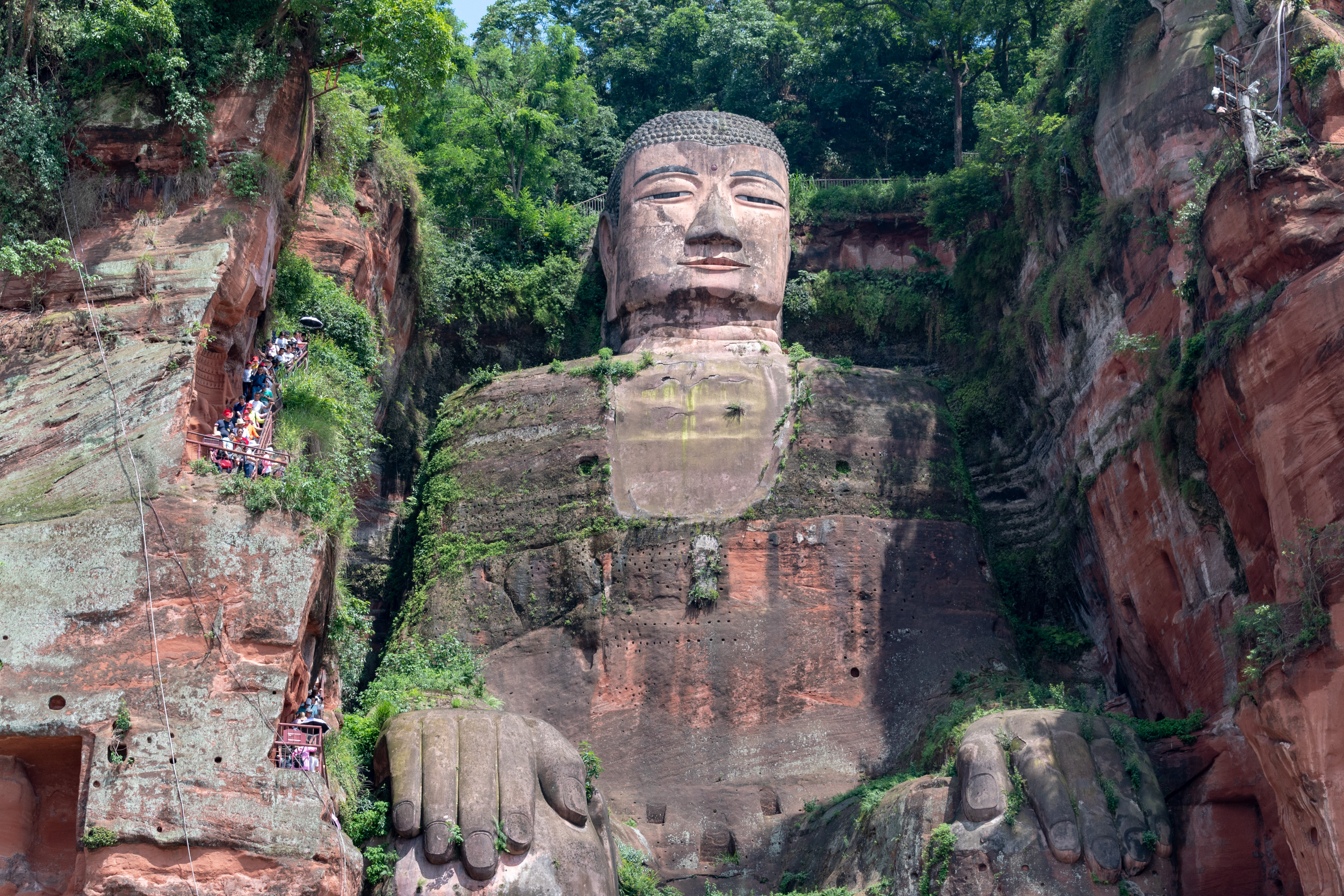
Tourists on stairs next to Leshan Giant Buddha

At 71 meters (233 ft) tall, the statue depicts a seated Buddha with his hands resting on his knees. His shoulders are 28 meters (92 ft) wide and his smallest toenail is large enough to easily accommodate a seated person. There is a local saying: "The mountain is a Buddha and the Buddha is a mountain". This is partially because the mountain range in which the Leshan Giant Buddha is located is thought to be shaped like a slumbering Buddha when seen from the river, with the Leshan Giant Buddha as its heart.

This 71-meter (233-foot) statue, carved in the Lingyun Mountain, is the biggest and tallest stone Buddha statue in the world (only the modern Great Buddha of Thailand, made of concrete, is taller). Leshan Giant Buddha's hair is composed of 1,021 spiraled curls embedded in his head that measures 14.7 meters (48 feet) in height and 10 meters (33 feet) in width. His ears, capable of holding two people inside, are 7 meters (23 feet) long. He has 5.6-meter (18-foot) long eyebrows, 8.3 meters (27 feet) long fingers, 24 meters (79 feet) wide shoulders, and a 5.6-meter (18-foot) long nose. His mouth and each of his eyes have a width of 3.3 meters (11 feet). His instep that is around 8.5 meters (28 feet) in width can hold about a hundred people and his smallest toenail can fit one seated person. This statue is ten stories high, which can be compared to the size of the Statue of Liberty if Buddha stood upright. Buddha's body is placed in a symmetrical posture and the proportions of his various body parts are proportioned in accordance with the Buddharupa requirements of a statue. It has a calm form, which conforms to the Tang dynasty statues' style.

== Drainage system ==
Between the two ears of the Buddha is an advanced drainage system that serves to preserve the statue from erosion. There are several hidden gutters and channels scattered within the Buddha's hair, collar, and chest areas, and holes in the back of his ears and chest that drain out rainwater to keep the interior dry. This architectural system has prevented the statue from eroding for the past 1,200 years.

== Protection ==
After the founding of the People's Republic of China, the Leshan Giant Buddha was designated as a cultural relic and put under protection by the Sichuan Provincial People's Committee in 1956. In 1996, the UNESCO World Heritage Committee included the Leshan Giant Buddha in the World Cultural and Natural Heritage List. In 1998, the Leshan Giant Buddha Scenic Area Management Committee was formally established. The management committee's scope of control reached 17.88 square kilometers (6.90 sq mi). In 2008, the Mount Emei - Leshan Giant Buddha Scenic Area Management Committee was formally established, with the main task of developing tourism resources for Mount Emei and the Leshan Giant Buddha. On 24 March 2002, the first phase of the Leshan Giant Buddha repair project by the World Bank officially started. The project included completely renovating the Buddha from chest up to the head and then strengthening the rock wall. On 23 June 2002, the second phase of the Leshan Giant Buddha Maintenance Project started. During this phase, the rocks at the Buddha's feet were repaired and the eroded part of the rock below water level was repaired.

== Tourism ==
Being one of the six world cultural heritage sites in the province of Sichuan, it receives a lot of tourist visits. From 2001 to 2003, it was ranked the second most popular attraction amongst the provincial heritage sites with 1.4 to 1.5 million visitors per year. In 2004, there was a breakthrough which led the numbers to drastically go up to 2.1 million visitors. From 2005 to 2007, it had around 2.3 to 2.8 million visitors per year, which was more than all the other sites. The influx of tourists has allowed the local economy to flourish from the various jobs and income provided. However, there is backlash as to how ethical the rise in tourism, can affect the quality of the statue. With that, the local government has set limits and guidelines to preserve the integrity of the statue. The Leshan Giant Buddha is most popular during Chinese New Year when tourists from all over the world come to pray for good luck.

The most convenient way to get to the Giant Buddha from Leshan Town is through the local bus 13. Upon arrival, it is necessary to purchase a ticket at the price of CNY 90 per person (including Wuyou Temple & Mahao Cliff Tomb). The opening hours are 7:30am–6:30pm from April until October and 8:00am–5:30pm from October until March. The weekends and holidays are much busier compared to weekdays.

Apart from the main attraction, there are dozens of pathways throughout the mountain that can be explored by foot.

People come from all over the world to worship Maitreya. To get a closeup view, there is a pedestrian pathway that allows visitors to appreciate the changing view of Buddha's body through multiple perspectives. The plank pathways there are steep and narrow. To get a more panoramic view of him, there are sightseeing boats available at the price of CNY 70 per person. Since these boats have a capacity of 35 passengers, there may be a waiting line.

== Gallery ==
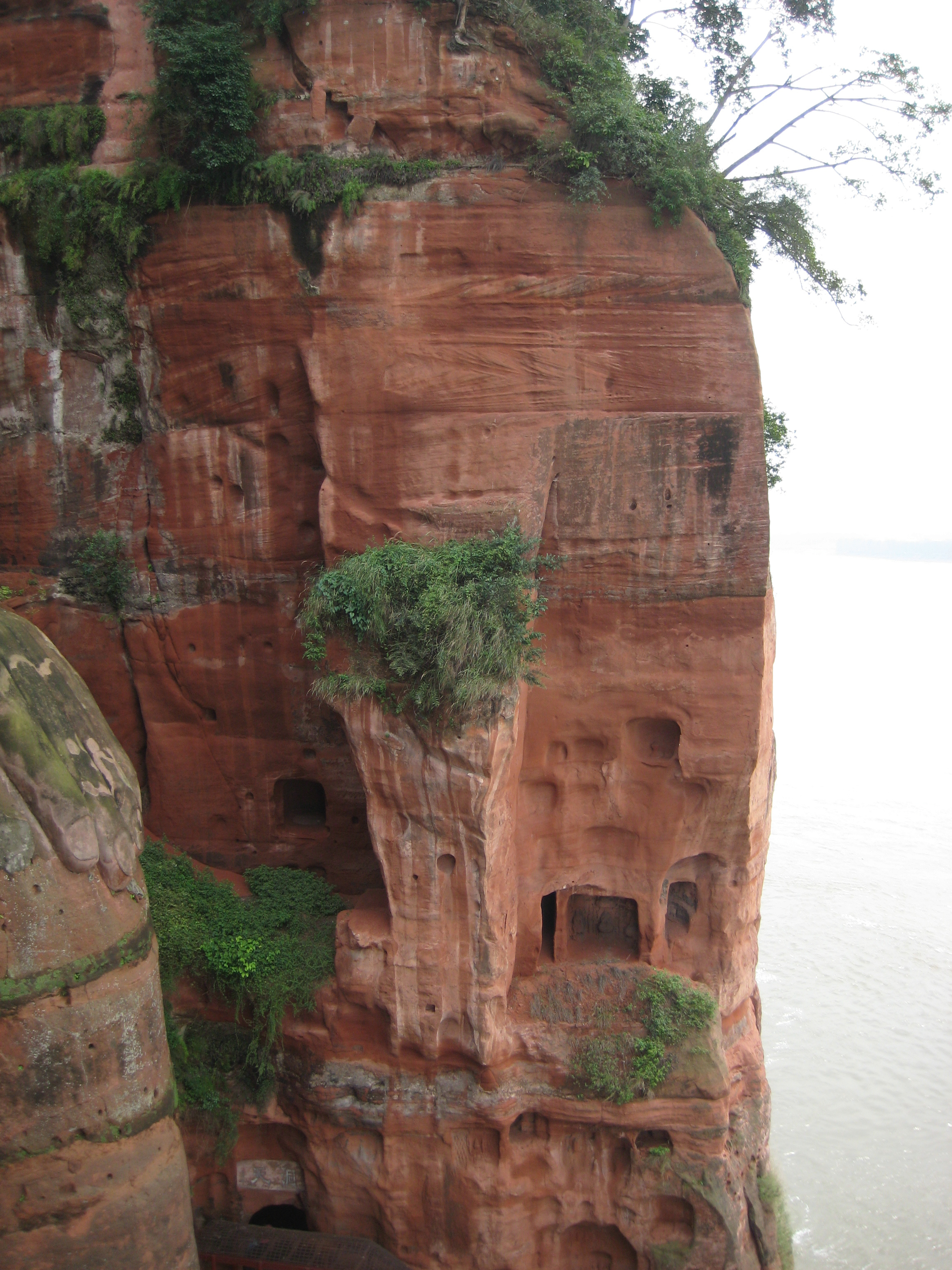
The cliff to the left of the statue.

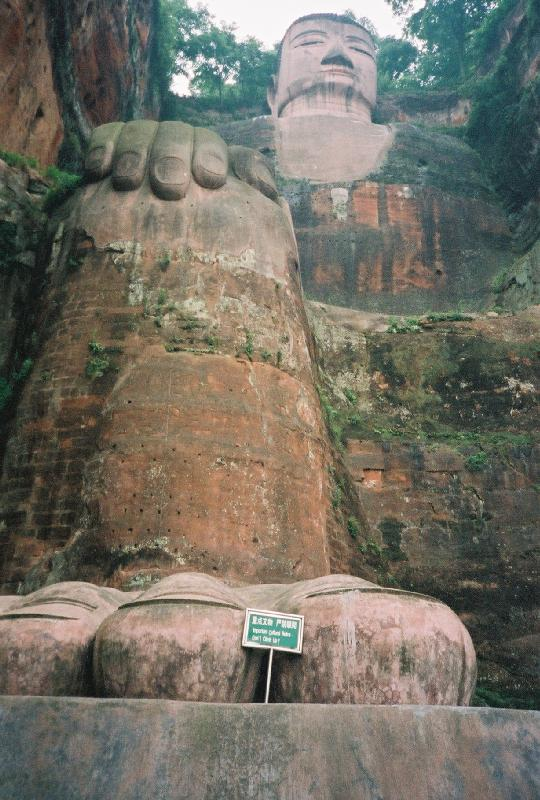
The statue seen from ground level.

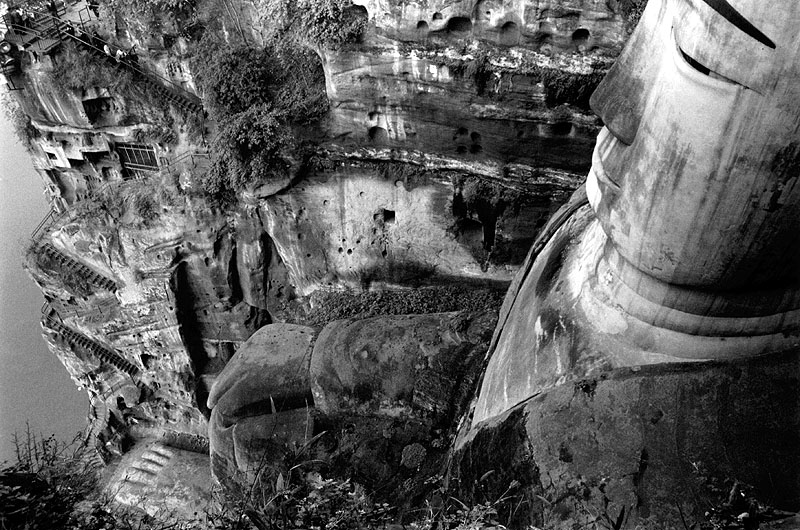
The statue seen from above.

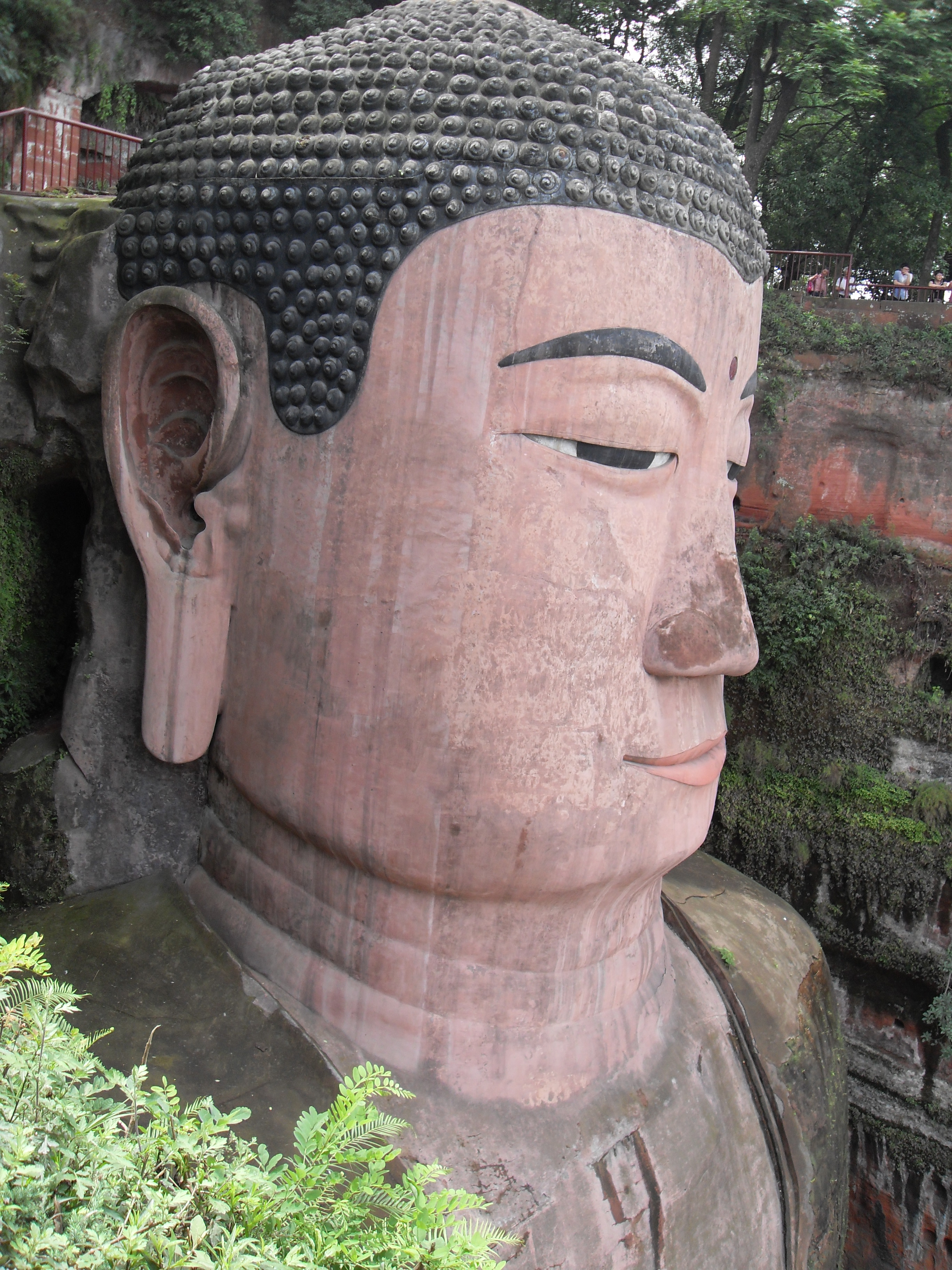
The head seen from the staircase.

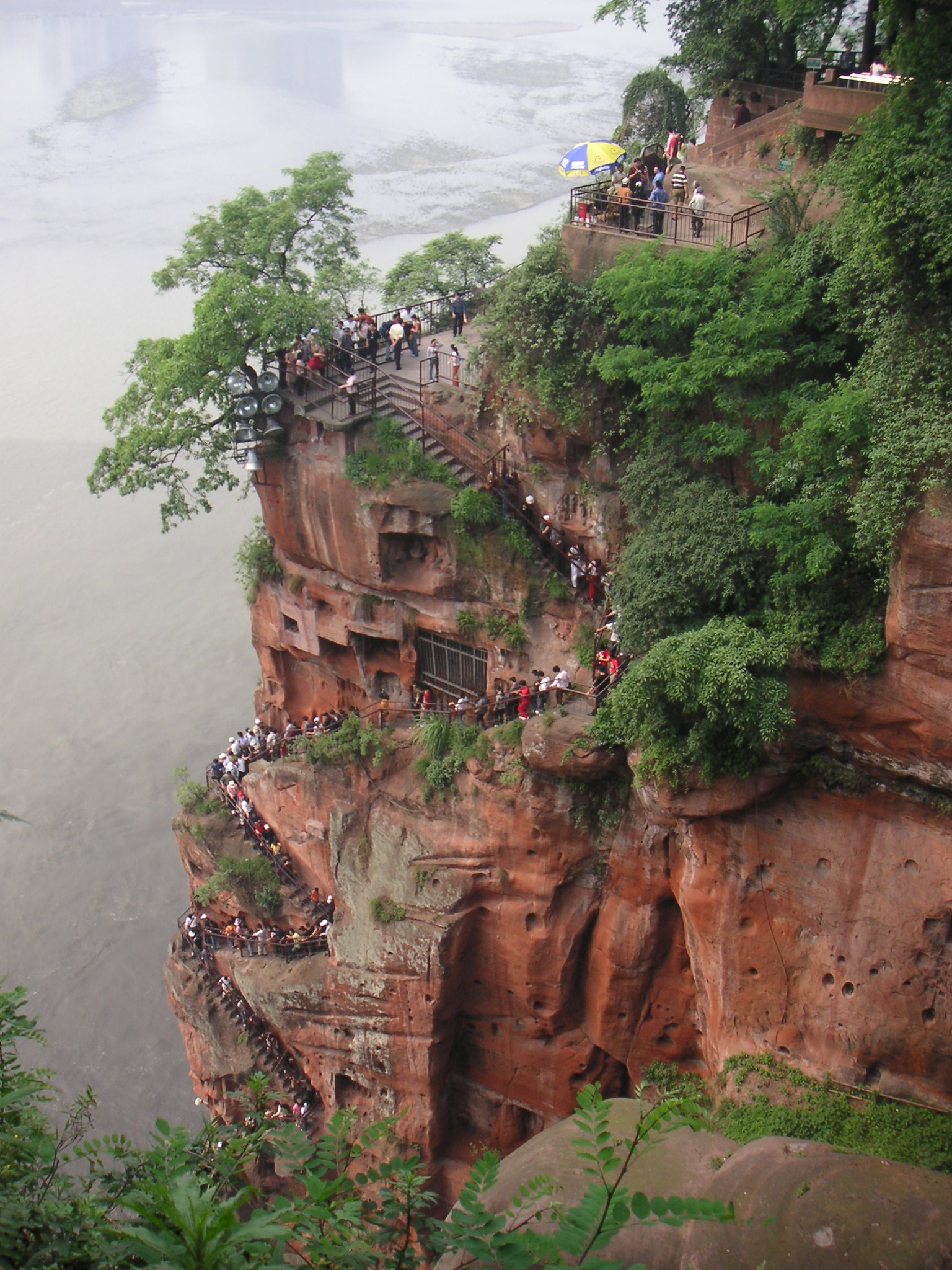
The path winding up to the statue.

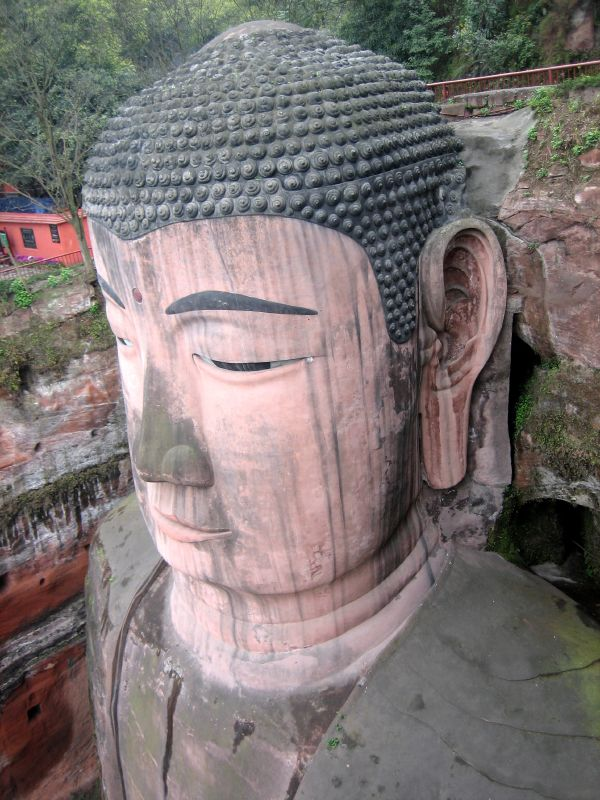
Detailed close-up shot of the statue's face.

== See also ==
- Buddhas of Bamiyan
- Laykyun Sekkya
- Great Buddha of Thailand
- The Big Buddha (Hong Kong)
- Buddha Dordenma statue
- Great Buddha
- Buddhist art
- Chinese Buddhism
- Great Anti-Buddhist Persecution
- Tang dynasty
- List of tallest statues
