= Shuangjiangkou Dam =

Dam in Sichuan Province, China

- Rendition of the dam

- Location within China
- Country: China
- Location: Sichuan Province
- Coordinates: 31°47′33″N 101°55′21″E
- Status: Under construction
- Construction began: 2013
- Opening date: 2026
- Construction cost: US$4.02 billion (¥24.68 billion, £2.9 billion)
- Owners: State Power Dadu Hydropower Development Co., Ltd.

Dam and spillways
- Type of dam: Embankment, rock-fill
- Impounds: Dadu River
- Height: 312 m (1,024 ft)
- Height (foundation): 314 m (1,030 ft)
- Length: 648.66 m (2,128 ft)
- Elevation at crest: 2,510 m (8,235 ft)
- Width (crest): 16 m (52 ft)
- Dam volume: 44,000,000 m^{3} (1.553845336×10^{9} ft^{3})

Reservoir
- Creates: Shuangjiangkou Reservoir
- Total capacity: 3,135,000,000 m^{3} (2,541,586 acre⋅ft)
- Active capacity: 2,151,000,000 m^{3} (1,743,844 acre⋅ft)
- Catchment area: 39,330 km^{2} (15,185 sq mi)
- Normal elevation: 2,500 m (8,202 ft)

Power Station
- Commission date: 2027
- Type: Conventional
- Hydraulic head: 226.4 m (743 ft) (mean)
- Turbines: 4 × 500 MW Francis-type
- Installed capacity: 2,000 MW
- Annual generation: 7,700 GWh

The Shuangjiangkou Dam (Chinese: 双江口大坝/双江口水电站), also referred to as Shuang Jiang Kou (Chinese: 双江口), is an embankment dam currently being constructed in a gorge on the Dadu River in Sichuan Province, China. When completed, the 312-metre-tall (1,024-foot) dam will be the tallest dam in the world. Preliminary construction began in 2008 and the entire project was expected to be complete in 2018. By April 2011, over 200,000,000 m^{3} (260,000,000 yd^{3}) of material had been excavated from the construction site. In March 2013, China's Ministry of Environmental Protection approved construction on the dam's superstructure and associated facilities. The government acknowledged that the dam would have negative impacts on the environment but that developers were working to mitigate them. The dam is being built by the Guodian Group at a cost of US$4.02 billion. The entire construction period is expected to last 10 years. All turbines are expected to be commissioned by 2027.

== Design ==
The Shuangjiangkou Dam, when completed, will be a 312-metre-high (1,024-foot) (314 m (1,030 ft) from the foundation) and 648.66-metre-long (2,128.1-foot) rock-fill dam with a relatively impervious core. The dam's crest width will be 16 m (52 ft), its elevation 2,510 m (8,235 ft) above sea level. It will have a structural volume of approximately 44,000,000 m^{3} (1.6×10^{9} ft^{3}). The dam will sit at the head of a 39,330 km^{2} (15,185 mi^{2}) drainage basin and have a reservoir capacity of 3,135,000,000 m^{3} (2,542,000 acre⋅ft), of which 2,151,000,000 m^{3} (1,744,000 acre⋅ft) is regulating or active (useful) storage. Normal reservoir elevation will be 2,500 m (8,202 ft) and minimum 2,420 m (7,940 ft). Flood elevations range between 2,501 and 2,504 m (8,205 and 8,215 ft). The dam's power station will contain four 500 MW Francis turbine-generators for an installed capacity of 2000 MW. Firm capacity of the power station is expected to be 503 MW along with the station operating for 4064 hours each year. The power station's design flow is 1,090 m^{3}/s (38,000 cu ft/s) and the mean hydraulic head 226.4 m (743 ft).

== See also ==
- List of dams and reservoirs in China
- List of tallest dams
- List of power stations in China
