= Dagangshan Dam =

- Location within China Location within Sichuan
- Country: China
- Location: Sichuan Province
- Coordinates: 29°26′55″N 102°13′07″E
- Status: Operational
- Construction began: 2008
- Opening date: 2015
- Owners: Dadu Hydropower Development Co., Ltd

Dam and spillways
- Type of dam: Arch
- Impounds: Dadu River
- Height: 210 metres (689 ft)
- Length: 610 metres (2,001 ft)
- Width (crest): 10 metres (33 ft)
- Width (base): 52 metres (171 ft)

Reservoir
- Creates: Dagangshan Reservoir
- Total capacity: 724,000,000 cubic metres (586,956 acre⋅ft)
- Maximum water depth: 205 metres (673 ft) (avg.)

Power Station
- Commission date: 2015-2016
- Turbines: 4 x 650 MW
- Installed capacity: 2,600 MW
- Annual generation: 11.43 billion kWh

The Dagangshan Dam (Chinese: 大岗山水电站) is an arch dam on the Dadu River in Shimian County, Ya'an, Sichuan Province, China. The dam houses a hydroelectric power station with 4 x 650 MW generators for a total installed capacity of 2,600 MW. Construction on the dam began in 2008 and the power plant in 2010. The first two generators were commissioned on 2 September 2015, and the entire project was completed in 2016.

== See also ==
- List of power stations in China
