= Dadu River =

River in southwestern China

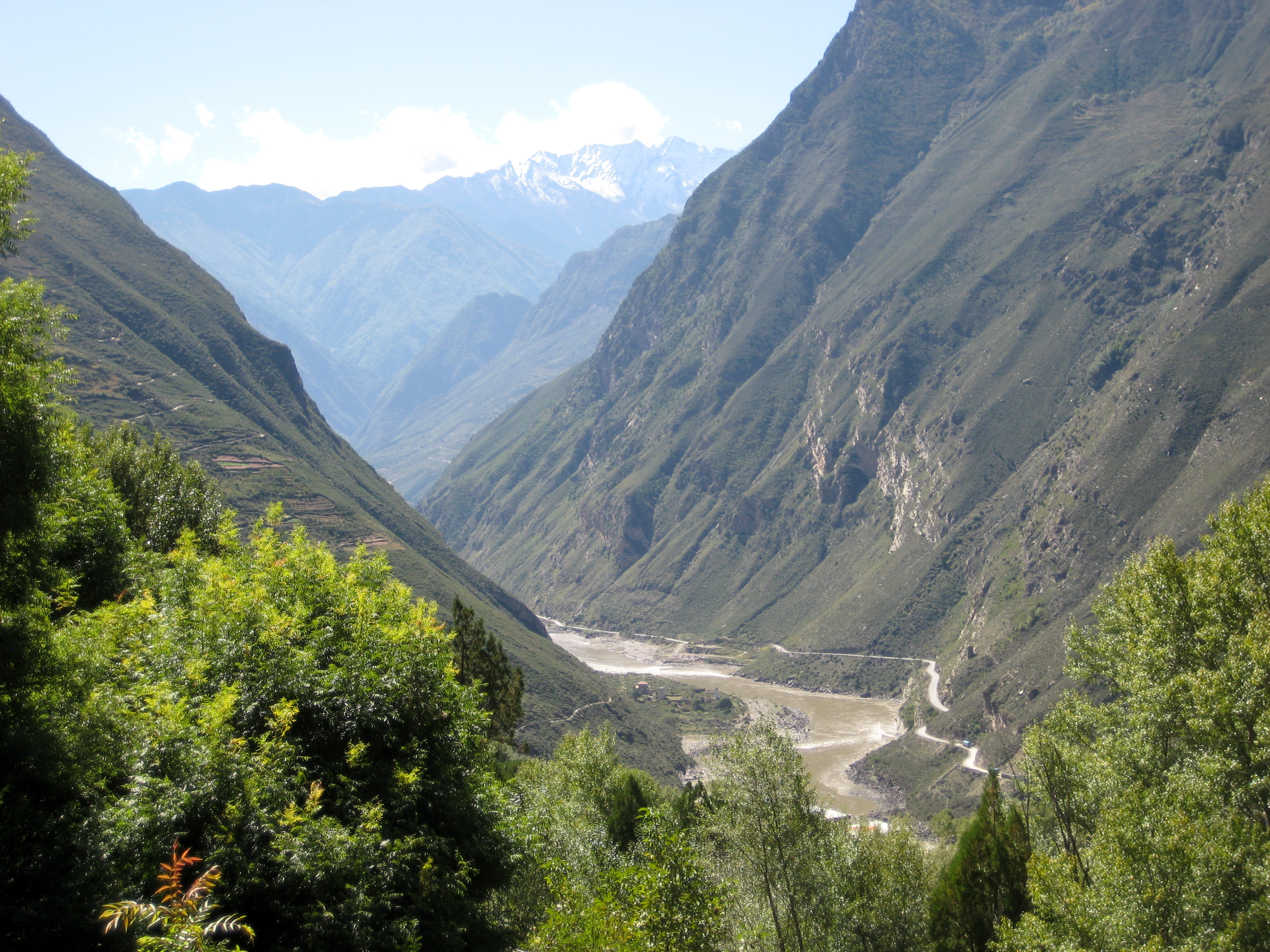
- The Dadu River in Danba County
- Native name: Dadu He (Chinese)

Physical characteristics
- Source
  - location: 33°23′16″N 100°17′32″E; Darlag County, Qinghai
  - elevation: 4,579 m (15,023 ft)
- Mouth
  - location: 29°32′58″N 103°45′53″E; Min River at Leshan, Sichuan
- Length: 1,076 km (669 mi)
- Basin size: 92,000 km^{2} (36,000 sq mi)
- Discharge
  - average: 1,760 m^{3}/s (62,000 cu ft/s)

The Dadu River (Chinese: 大渡河; pinyin: Dàdù Hé; Wade–Giles: Tatu Ho, Yi: ꍩꍠꒉꄿ, romanized: Chot Zhyr Yy Dda), (Note: The old Chinese name for the Dadu River is Chinese: 涐; pinyin: é. From "Meaning of 涐". Purple Culture.) known in Tibetan as the Gyelmo Ngul Chu (Tibetan: རྒྱལ་མོ་རྔུལ་ཆུ་, Wylie: rgyal mo rngul chu), is a major river located primarily in Sichuan province, southwestern China. The Dadu flows from the eastern Tibetan Plateau into the Sichuan Basin where it joins with the Min River, a tributary of the Yangtze River. Measured from its geographic source, the Dadu is actually longer than the Min River, with a total length of 1,076 km (669 mi) and thus forms the main stem of the Min River system.

Shuangjiangkou Dam, expected to be the tallest dam in the world, is being built on the Dadu River.

== Geography ==
=== Sources ===
The Dadu River originates, in name, in Danba and ends in Leshan where it meets the Min River. The true source of Dadu, and thus the entire Min River system, however, lies in Qinghai Province in the eastern Tibetan Plateau. In this region there are multiple headwaters of the Dadu with nearly identical lengths that have resulted in competing claims as the true source of the Dadu. In 2013, the China Academy of Sciences announced they had located the geographic source of the Dadu in eastern Darlag County, Qinghai (33°23′16″N 100°17′32″E). These headwaters (Chinese: 马尔曲; pinyin: Mǎ'ěr Qū) are a tributary of the Markog (Chinese: 玛柯河; pinyin: Mǎkē Hé), one of the two main upper stems of the Dadu along with the Darkog (Chinese: 杜柯河; pinyin: Dùkē Hé). Traditionally, the source of the Dadu was considered to be in the Golog Mountains in Jigzhi County at the head of the Markog, but this source was found to be a few metres shorter than the true source. Similarly, the source of the Darkog in southern Darlag County is a mere 1 m (3.3 ft) shorter than the Ma'er Qu source.

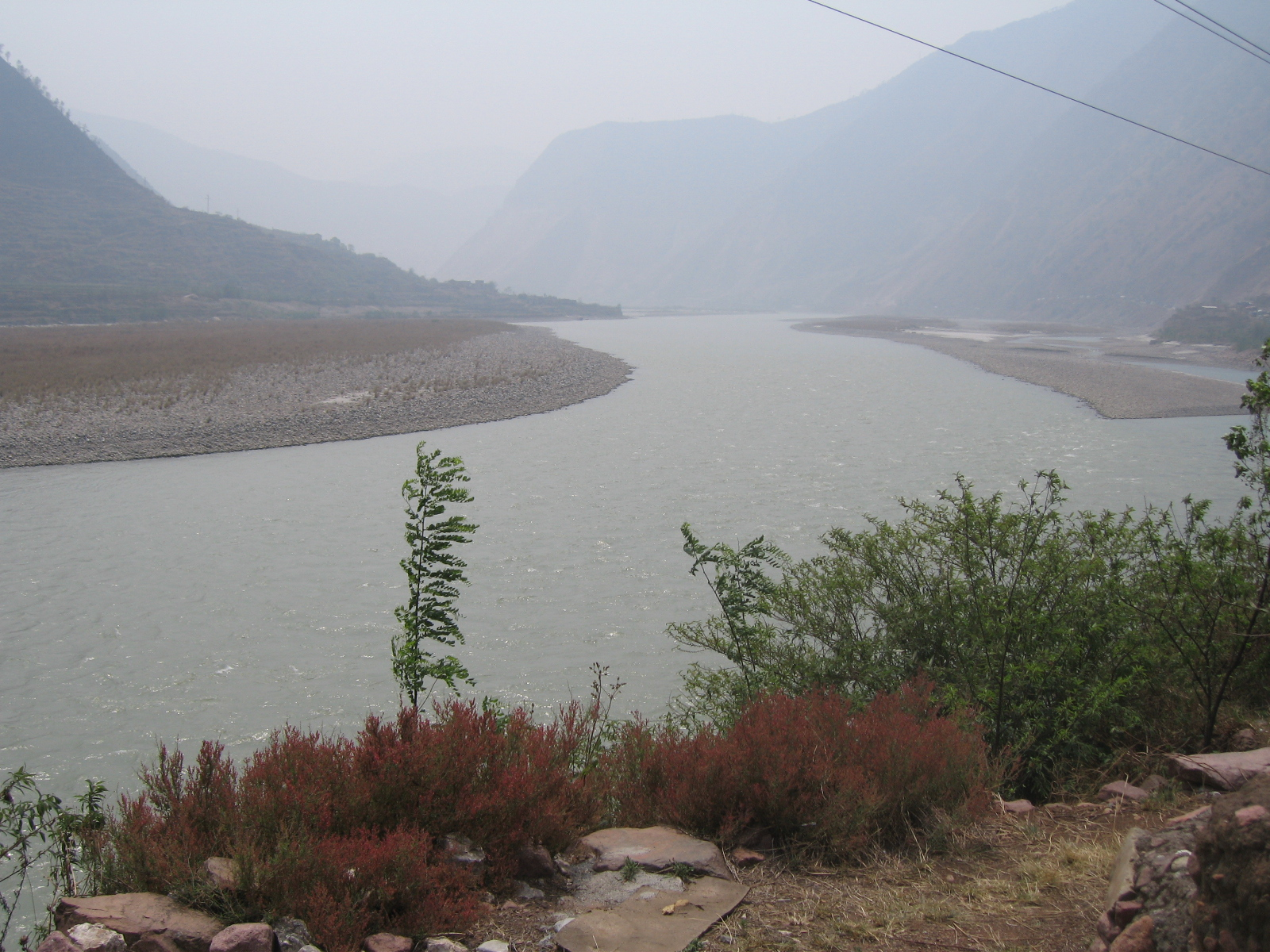
The Dadu River in Hanyuan

From the Dadu River's true source in Qinghai to the Min River's confluence with the Yangtze in Yibin, the length of the entire Min-Dadu River system is 1,279 km (795 mi).

=== Course ===
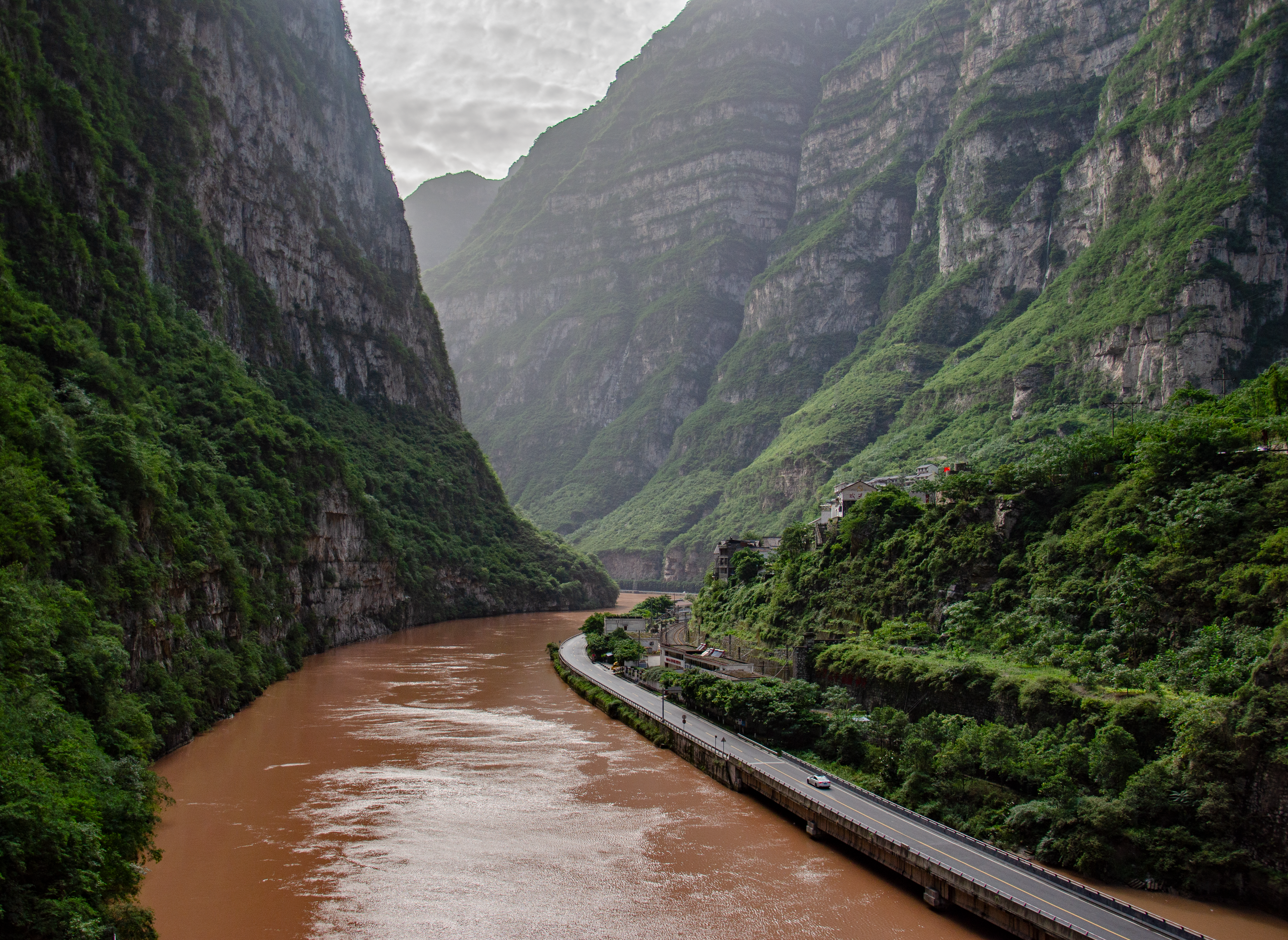
Dadu River Canyon in Jinkouhe District

The Dokog River in the west and the Markog River in the east both flow southeasterly from the Bayan Har Mountains in Qinghai and into Sichuan Province. The two stems meet in Aba Prefecture, and continue south as the Dajin Chuan (Chinese: 大金川; pinyin: Dàjīn Chuān; lit. 'Big Golden River'). Here, the river flows between the Daxue Mountains to the west and the Qionglai Mountains to the east. In Danba County, the Dajin Chuan meets the Xiaojin Chuan (Chinese: 小金川; pinyin: Xiǎojīn Chuān; lit. 'Little Golden River') and together become the Dadu River in name. The Dadu continues south through Luding until it turns east at Shimian. East of Hanyuan, the Dadu enters the Dadu River Canyon (Chinese: 大渡河峡谷; pinyin: Dàdùhé Xiágǔ) before reaching the lowlands of the Sichuan Basin just below Mount Emei.

The Dadu River receives the Qingyi River tributary and meets the Min at Leshan. At the confluence of the Dadu with the Min, the Dadu possesses both greater water volume flow and a further source so it is considered the true course of the Min River system. From the confluence of the two rivers, the Min continues for another 120 km (75 mi) before meeting the Yangtze at Yibin.

== History ==
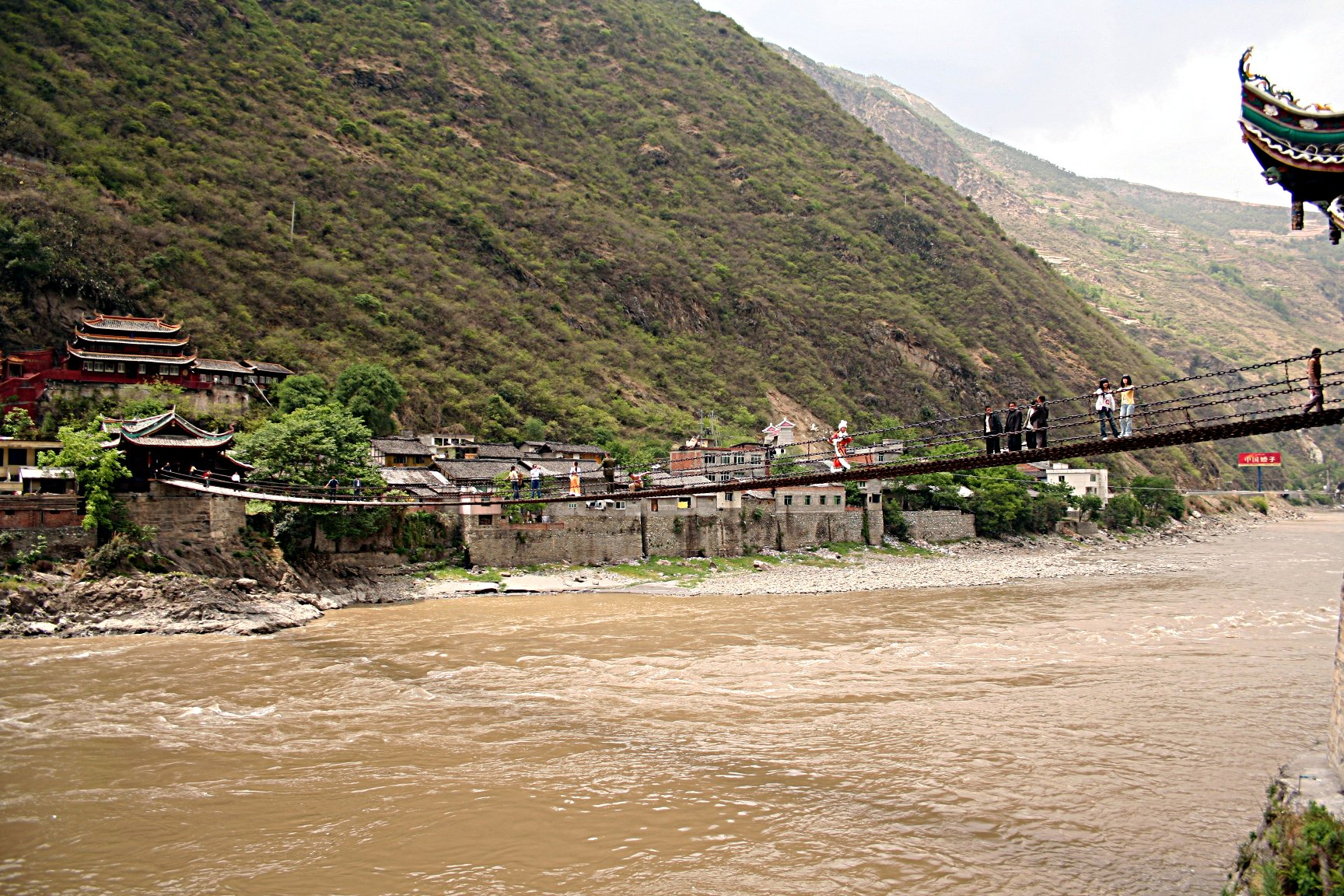
Luding bridge

The Dadu River marks the transition area between traditional Tibet to the west and historic China to the east. For this reason, it has long been considered a frontier region and has hosted many conflicts. For Tibetans, the Dadu is part of the historical province of Kham. In the Chinese tradition, the Dadu forms the westernmost part of Sichuanese culture. Kangding, a historical trading post between Tibet and China, is located in the Dadu River basin.

Upper Dadu River Basin traditionally consists of 18 rGyalrong Principalities, whose language, rGyalrongic, is a distinct branch in the Tibeto-Burman language family.

Completed in 803 CE, the Leshan Giant Buddha is a large statue carved into the rock at the confluence of the Dadu and Min Rivers. The Buddha is a popular tourist attraction today.

The Kangding Louding earthquake of 1786 caused a landslide dam on the Dadu. Nine days later, on 10 June 1786, the dam broke and the resulting flood extended 1,400 kilometres (870 mi) downstream and killed 100,000 people. It is the second-deadliest landslide disaster on record.

In the 20th century CE, the Dadu became famous for its Luding Bridge, a historically important bridge crossed by the Chinese Red Army while retreating from the Kuomintang troops during the Long March.

=== Dams ===
The Dadu is being heavily developed, primarily for hydroelectric power. As of March 2014, a total of 26 dams are completed, under construction or planned for the river. Those dams are listed below from downstream to upstream.

- Angu Dam – Under construction, 320 MW
- Fahuasi Dam – Planned, 240 MW
- Shawan Dam – Under construction, 480 MW
- Tongjiezi Dam – Completed, 600 MW
- Gongzui Dam – Completed, 770 MW
- Shaping Dam – Programmed, 630 MW
- Zhentouba Dam – Programmed, 950 MW
- Shenxigou Dam – Under construction, 660 MW
- Pubugou Dam – Completed, 3,600 MW
- Laoyingyan Dam – Programmed, 640 MW
- Longtoushi Dam – Completed, 700 MW
- Dagangshan Dam – Under construction, 2,600 MW
- Yingliangbao Dam – Programmed, 1,200 MW
- Luding Dam – Completed, 920 MW
- Huangjinping Dam – Under construction, 850 MW
- Changheba Dam – Under construction, 2,600 MW
- Houziyan Dam – Under construction, 1,700 MW
- Danba Dam – Programmed, 1,300 MW
- Badi Dam – Programmed, 800 MW
- Anning Dam – Programmed, 380 MW
- Jinchuan Dam – Programmed, 860 MW
- Shuangjiangkou Dam – Under construction, 2,000 MW
- Busigou Dam – Planned, 360 MW
- Dawei Dam – Planned, 270 MW
- Bala Dam – Planned, 740 MW
- Xiaerxia Dam – Planned, 540 MW

== In popular culture ==
- A song from the Chinese musical The East Is Red is entitled "Across the Dadu River."
- A 1980 Chinese film is titled Dadu River.
