= Pubugou Dam =

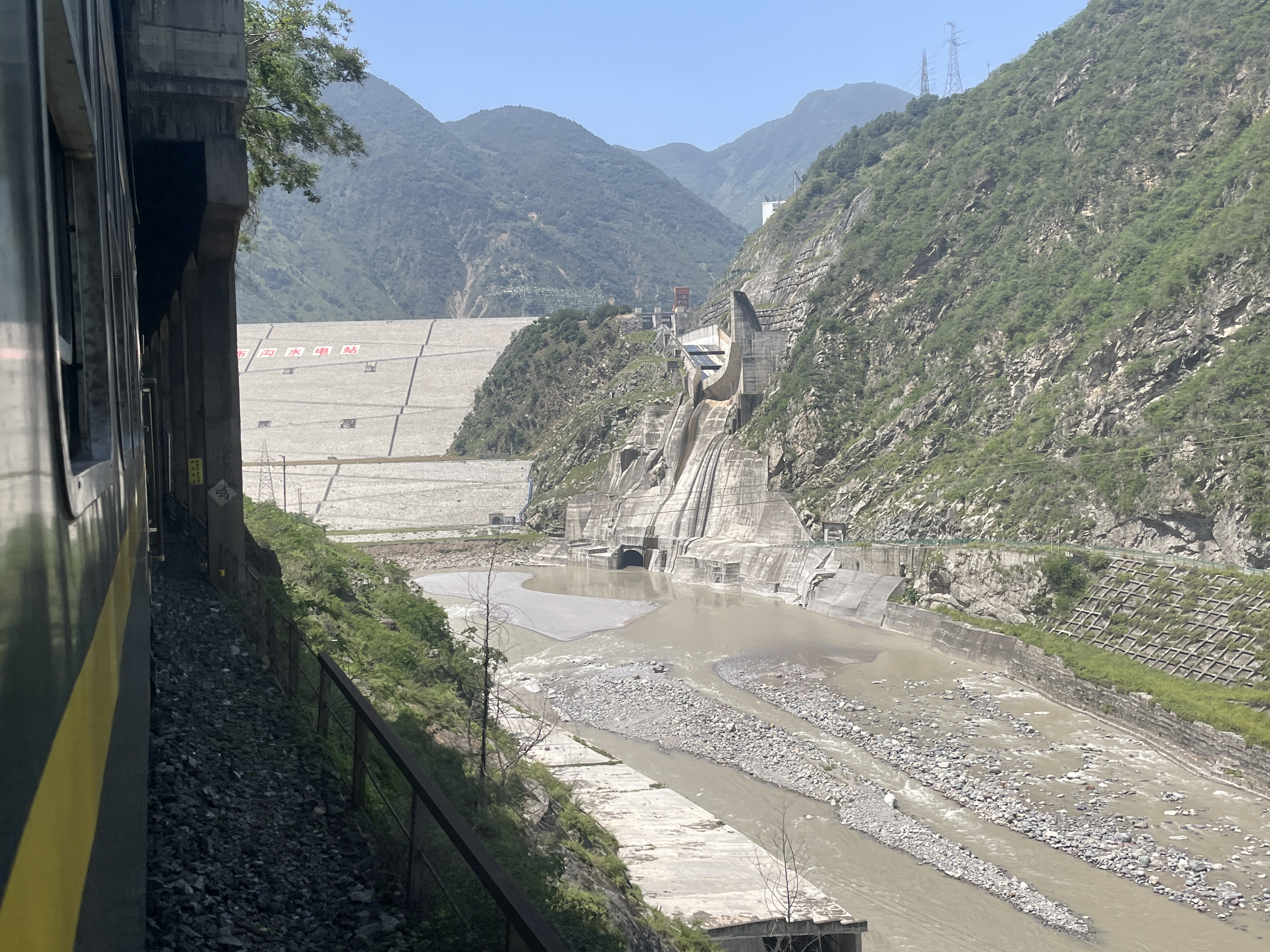

- Location within Sichuan
- Official name: 瀑布沟大坝
- Coordinates: 29°13′30″N 102°49′52″E
- Status: In use
- Construction began: 2004-03-30
- Opening date: 2010

Dam and spillways
- Type of dam: Embankment, concrete face rock-fill
- Impounds: Dadu River
- Height: 186 m (610 ft)

Reservoir
- Creates: Pubugou Reservoir
- Total capacity: 5,390,000,000 m^{3} (4,369,744 acre⋅ft)

Power Station
- Commission date: 2009-2010
- Turbines: 6 x 550 MW
- Installed capacity: 3,300 MW

The Pubugou Dam (simplified Chinese: 瀑布沟大坝; traditional Chinese: 瀑布溝大壩; pinyin: Pùbùgōu Dàbà) is a concrete face rock-fill embankment dam on the Dadu River, a tributary of the Yangtze River in Sichuan Province. The main purpose of the dam is hydroelectric power generation and its total generating capacity is 3,300 MW.

Construction started on March 30, 2004, the first generator was put into operation in December 2009 and the rest by March 2010. In 2004, the construction site was overrun by tens of thousands of protesters, though the only eventual result was the delay of construction by one year. The protests were about evictions stemming from planned flooding.

== See also ==
- List of power stations in China
