= Qingyi River (Sichuan) =

Coordinates: 29.5528°N 103.7157°E

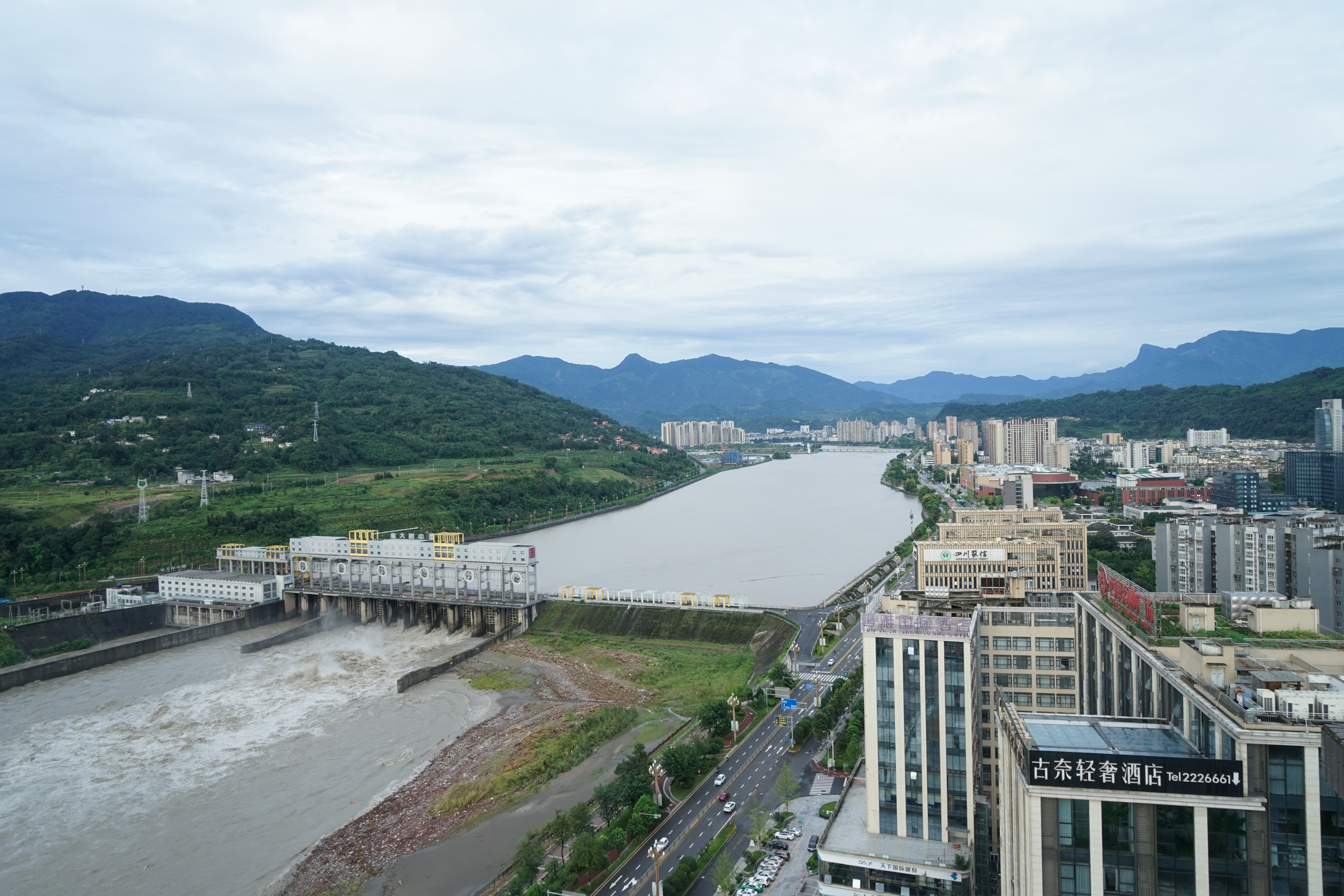

Location
- Country: China

Physical characteristics
- Source
  - location: Shu-Xi-Ying, Sichuan
  - elevation: 5,364 m (17,598 ft)
- Mouth
  - location: Dadu River near Leshan, Sichuan
  - elevation: 361 m (1,184 ft)
- Length: 276 km (171 mi)
- Basin size: 13,300 km^{2} (5,100 sq mi)

Basin features
- River system: Dadu River and Min River System; Yangtze River

Qingyi River (Chinese: 青衣江) is a major river in western Sichuan. Qingyi means blueish-colored clothes. This name came from the local ancient kingdom Qingyi Qiang Kingdom (est. in 816 B.C.), in which notable people preferred to wear blue clothes. Qingyi River is the longest tributary of Dadu River, and it is also a major river in upper Yangtze River system. The elevation difference between its source and mouth is more than 5,000 meters.
